= California Digital Newspaper Collection =

Online archive of digitized newspapers

Screenshot of California Digital Newspaper Collection website on mobile device

The California Digital Newspaper Collection (CDNC) is a freely-available archive of digitized California newspapers; it is accessible through the project's website. The collection contains over six million pages from over 50 million articles. The project is part of the Center for Bibliographical Studies and Research (CBSR) at the University of California Riverside. Due to funding issues, the website went offline in September 2025. As of December 2025, the website was operational. As of January 2026, the CNDC has become more stable in terms of technology and funding, and has resumed a couple projects associated with the National Endowment for the Humanities that were disrupted and suspended.

== History ==
The Center for Bibliographical Studies and Research was one of six initial participants in the National Digital Newspaper Program (NDNP), a newspaper digitization project established from a partnership between the Library of Congress and the National Endowment for the Humanities. Between 2005 and 2011, the CBSR received three two-year grants, and contributed around 300,000 pages to Chronicling America, the public face of the NDNP. The CDNC announced that they restored their relationship with National Digital Newspaper Program in January 2026.

Published newspaper titles submitted include the San Francisco Call, Los Angeles Daily Herald, Amador Ledger, and the Imperial Valley Press. In 2015, the CBSR received a fourth grant from the National Digital Newspaper Project. Between 2015 and 2017, the project contributed another 100,000 pages from the Gold Rush era, as well as foreign-language newspapers.

The California Digital Newspaper Collection was officially launched in 2007, and contained the initial 100,000 pages produced for the National Digital Newspaper Project from 2005 to 2007. In 2008, the CDNC was selected as a recipient of the Larry L. Sautter Silver Award for Achievement in University Computing.

Another 50,000 pages were created, with support from the Institute of Museum and Library Services, under the provisions of the Library Services and Technology Act (LSTA), administered in California by the State Librarian. All content contributed to NDNP is also hosted in the CDNC, with important differences, noted below in Digitization.

Between 2007 and 2013, the CDNC digitized roughly 300,000 pages through the LSTA program, administered by the California State Library. In 2014, the project announced a five-year plan, supported by LSTA, to digitize one title per county, up through 1923.

In 2010, the CDNC initiated the "Born Digital Project", with the goal to collect and host contemporary PDFs from newspaper publishers. Roughly a dozen publishers have participated in the project.

As of 2023, the CDNC gets 150,000 unique monthly online visitors from academics, amateur historians, genealogists, schoolteachers, et al.

In January 2025, the CDNC was notified that California was withholding their annual appropriation of $430,000 for their 2024–2025 budget. In April 2025, CDNC director Brian Geiger said they needed to raise at least $300,000 to keep the archival site operational, and if they were unable to raise the funds, there is the possibility the site could go offline. The state budget cuts are a result of the national budget cuts to libraries. In July, UCR announced that state and federal funding had been restored and Daryle Williams, dean of the UCR College of Humanities, Arts and Social Sciences issued a statement, dated July 11, saying “UCR is actively working on a sustainable model for the CDNC to continue to be available to the public. Effective July 1, 2025, the Center for Bibliographic Studies and Research functions under the direct oversight of the Office of the Dean within the College of Humanities, Arts and Social Sciences (CHASS).” However, CBSR staff members had all been laid off on June 27. Geiger expressed confusion at the dean's statement. “There's really no CBSR there anymore,” he said. Operations were suspended July 1, 2025. The last progress update was posted August 13, 2025. In mid-September (Sept 14–22) the CDNC website was offline. As of December 2025, the website was operational.

== Digitization ==
The California Digital Newspaper Collection follows standards established by the National Digital Newspaper Program. Microfilm or newsprint is scanned to create TIFF images; whenever possible, master negative film is used. The CBSR manages an archive of approximately 100,000 reels of negative film. These are stored and maintained by the California Newspaper Microfilm Archive. When negative film is unavailable, positive can be used, but image quality and OCR will not be as good.

The TIFF images are then processed or "digitized" to create derivative files, including a JP2, PDF, and METS/ALTO XML for each page.

Unlike NDNP, the CDNC has traditionally digitized to article-level rather than just page-level. Individual "segments" on a page—articles, illustrations, advertisements, etc.—are identified during digitization and can be retrieved by the researcher. For an illustration of the difference between page- and article-level, compare the San Francisco Call in the CDNC to the same title in Chronicling America.

Recently the CDNC has begun digitizing some titles to page-level, but most are still article-level. The main advantage of page-level is lower cost when done in an automated fashion, without human input.

With the CBSR staff layoffs at the end of June 2025, it was not clear if any of the digitization projects that was put on hold would ever resume without finding new funding sources. By January 2026, with more stable funding, Williams reported the CDNC is not currently taking new projects as they work on finishing up projects that were suspended, especially projects associated with the National Endowment for the Humanities focused on African-American newspapers from the Los Angeles and Bay areas. Williams did not rule out adding new digital content in future but confirmed that it is not an immediate priority. There are more than 50 million pages of digitized newspaper pages in the archive, with 20-plus million pages that are currently searchable.

== Papers covered ==
- Adin Argus (Adin, 1882–1937)
- Alameda Encinal (Alameda, 1869–1906)
- Alameda Post (Alameda, 1869)
- Alturas Plaindealer (Alturas, 1906–1940)
- Amador Ledger (Jackson, 1855–1919)
- Antelope Valley Political Observer (Palmdale, 2010–2012)
- Aptos Post (Aptos, 1981–1983)
- Atwater Signal (Atwater, 1911–1934)
- Auburn Daily Journal (Auburn, 1914–1918)
- Auburn Journal (Auburn, 1885–1924)
- Bay Area Reporter (San Francisco, 1971–2005)
- Beach and Bay Press (San Diego, 2007–2010)
- Belvedere Citizen/Eastside Journal (Los Angeles, 1968–1980)
- Big Pine Citizen (Big Pine, 1914–1933)
- Black Voice News (Riverside, 2006)
- Blade-Tribune (Oceanside, 1892–1960)
- Blue Lake Advocate (Blue Lake, 1888–1969)
- Boulevard Sentinel (Eagle Rock, 2012–2015)
- Calaveras Chronicle (Mokelumne Hill, 1851–1868)
- Calexico Chronicle (Calexico, 1904–1998)
- California Aggie (Davis, 1915–2014)
- California Crusader News (Los Angeles, 2010)
- California Farmer and Journal of Useful Sciences (San Francisco, 1855–1880)
- California Star (San Francisco, 1847–1848)
- California Star & Californian (San Francisco, 1848)
- The Californian (Monterey, 1846–1848)
- Campus News (East Los Angeles College; Monterey Park, 2008–2019)
- Central News Wave (Los Angeles, 1971–1972)
- Chester Progressive (Chester, 1955–1957)
- Chico Record (Chico, 1856–1948)
- Chico Weekly Enterprise (Chico, 1869–1907)
- Chula Vista Star-News (Chula Vista, 1989–2008)
- Citrus College Clarion (Glendora, 1964–2023)
- Cloverdale Enterprise (Cloverdale, 1919)
- Cloverdale Reveille (Cloverdale, 1882–1996)
- Coast Side Comet (Montara, 1910–1923)
- Columbia Gazette (Columbia, 1853–1858)
- Columbia Weekly News (Columbia, 1858–1859)
- Colusa Daily Sun (Colusa, 1892–1922)
- Colusa Herald (Colusa, 1916–1932)
- Contra Costa Independent (Richmond, 1910–1939)
- Coronado Citizen (Coronado, 1937–1942)
- Coronado Compass (Coronado, 1946–1949)
- Coronado Eagle (Coronado, 1990–1998)
- Coronado Eagle & Journal (Coronado, 1912–2018)
- Coronado Mercury (Coronado, 1887–1896)
- Coronado Saturday Night (Coronado, 1922)
- Coronado Tent City Daily Program (Coronado, 1903)
- Corsair (Santa Monica, 1929–2011)
- Crenshaw-Mesa Southwest wave (Los Angeles, 1941)
- Crónica (Los Angeles, 1872–1889)
- Cypress Enterprise (Buena Park, 1948–1952)
- Daily Alta California (San Francisco, 1849–1891)
- Daily California Express (Marysville, 1857–1959)
- Daily Evening Sentinel (Red Bluff, 1895–1905)
- Daily morning times (San Jose, 1879–1884)
- Daily National Democrat (Marysville, 1858–1861)
- Daily National Gazette (Grass Valley, 1853–1860)
- Daily News (Los Angeles, 1923–1954)
- Daily News (Van Nuys, 1930–1960)
- Daily News Leader (San Mateo, 1889–1924)
- Daily Placer Times and Transcript (Sacramento, 1849–1850)
- Daily Sentinel (Red Bluff, 1894)
- Daily Sentinel (Red Bluff 1883; 1892–1893)
- The Desert Sun (Palm Springs, 1934–1993)
- Dunsmuir news (Dunsmuir, 1890–1978)
- Eagle Rock Advertiser (Eagle Rock, 1928–1935)
- Eagle Rock Sentinel (Eagle Rock, 1910–1985)
- Eastside Journal/Belvedere Citizen (Los Angeles, 1968–1980)
- El Clamor Público (Los Angeles, 1855–1859)
- El Dorado Republican (Placerville, 1901–1923)
- El Paisano (Whittier, 1964–2016)
- El Patio (Coronado, 1920–1921)
- El Sereno Star (Los Angeles, 1953–1974)
- Elevator (San Francisco, 1865–1898)
- Empire County Argus (Coloma, 1853–1856)
- Enterprise Journal (South San Francisco, 1972–1979)
- Enterprise-Record (Chico, 1940–1970)
- Evening Index and San Bernardino News (San Bernardino, 1912–1918)
- Evening Sentinel (Santa Cruz, 1896–1907)
- Evening Star News (Culver City, 1944–1952)
- Evening Telegram and the Evening Index (San Bernardino, 1969)
- Evening Transcript (San Bernardino, 1898–1902)
- Evening Vanguard (Los Angeles, 1939–1960)
- Experience (Pittsburg, 1974–2015)
- Express (Sacramento, 1923–2009)
- Facts (Redlands, 1890–1892)
- Feather River Bulletin (Quincy, 1866–2002)
- Fort Bragg Advocate (Fort Bragg, 1890–1929)
- Fresno Tribune (Fresno, 1907–1912)
- Garden Grove News (Garden Grove, 1959)
- Georgetown News (Georgetown, 1854–1856)
- Geyserville Gazette (Geyserville, 1899–1918)
- Geyserville Press (Geyserville, 1940–1964)
- Golden Gate Guardian (San Francisco, 1941–1946)
- Greens Land Paper (San Francisco, 1872)
- Gridley Herald (Gridley, 1972–1985)
- Hanford Journal (Daily) (Hanford, 1898–1922)
- Hanford Journal (Weekly) (Hanford, 1891–1905)
- Hanford Sentinel (Hanford, 1901–2004)
- Healdsburg Enterprise (Healdsburg, 1878–1929)
- Healdsburg Tribune (Healdsburg, 1919–1937)
- Healdsburg Tribune, Enterprise and Scimitar (Healdsburg, 1888–1990)
- Highland Park News-Herald & Journal (Highland Park, Los Angeles, 1906–1988)
- Highland Park Post-Dispatch (Highland Park, Los Angeles, 1941–1942)
- Highlander (Riverside, 1954–2020)
- Hispano América (San Francisco, 1914–1917)
- Hollywood Riviera Tribune (Palos Verdes Estates, 1948–1967)
- Humboldt Times (Eureka, 1874–1925)
- Huntington Beach News (Huntington Beach, 1917–1918)
- Hydraulic Press (North San Juan, 1858–1861)
- Imperial Valley Press (Imperial, 1901–1911)
- Independent (Los Angeles, 1936–1946)
- Indian Valley Record (Greenville, 1931–1962)
- Inyo Independent (Independence, 1870–1942)
- Italia (San Francisco, 1897–1919)
- J. The Jewish News of Northern California (San Francisco, 1895–2024)
- King City Rustler (King City, 1901–1936)
- LA Downtown News (Los Angeles, 2011–2017)
- LA Evening Citizen News (Hollywood, 1944–1949)
- La Habra Star (La Habra, 1916–1966)
- La Jolla Light (La Jolla, 1922–1963)
- La Jolla Light and La Jolla Journal (La Jolla, 1919–1964)
- La Jolla Village News (San Diego, 2007)
- La Jolla Village News Readers Choice Awards (San Diego, 2009)
- La Porte Union (La Porte, 1868–1869)
- LA Weekly (Los Angeles, 1978–1999)
- Lariat (Mission Viejo, 1968–2016)
- Lassen County Times (Susanville, 1978–2000)
- Liberator (Los Angeles, 1901–1913)
- Lincoln Heights Bulletin-News (Los Angeles, 1964–1974)
- Lindsay Gazette (Lindsay, 1912–1980)
- Livermore Herald (Livermore, 1877–1899)
- Livermore Journal (Livermore, 1920–1933)
- Lompoc Journal (Santa Barbara, 1894–1918)
- Lompoc Review (Lompoc, 1919–1932)
- Los Angeles Daily News (Los Angeles, 1860–1872)
- Los Angeles Daily Star (Los Angeles, 1870–1879)
- Los Angeles Herald (Los Angeles, 1873–1927)
- Los Angeles Mirror (Los Angeles, 1949–1951)
- Los Angeles Star (Los Angeles, 1851–1870)
- Los Gatos Mail-News (Los Gatos, 1893–1915)
- Los Gatos News (Los Gatos, 1881–1915)
- Los Gatos Star (Los Gatos, 1923–1929)
- Los Gatos Times (Los Gatos, 1936–1990)
- Madera Mercury (Madera, 1901–1925)
- Madera Tribune (Madera, 1916–1968)
- Madera Weekly Tribune (Madera, 1918–1920)
- Marin County Tocsin (San Rafael, 1861–1918)
- Marin Journal (San Rafael, 1861–1922)
- Mariposa Democrat (Mariposa, 1857–1858)
- Mariposa Gazette (Mariposa, 1861–1922)
- Marysville Daily Appeal (Marysville, 1860–1922)
- Marysville Daily Herald (Marysville, 1850–1858)
- Merced County Sun (Merced, 1865–1922)
- Merced Express (Merced, 1875–1972)
- Merced Sun-Star (Merced, 1880–2001)
- Merced Tribune (Merced, 1872–1874)
- Mercury-register (Oroville, 1902–1964)
- Mill Valley Independent (Mill Valley, 1908–1910)
- Mill Valley Record (Mill Valley, 1907–1963)
- Modesto Bee (Modesto, 1929–1931)
- Modoc County Record (Alturas, 1937–1989)
- Modoc County Times (Alturas, 1928–1934)
- Morning Press (Santa Barbara, 1872–1922)
- Morning Times and Red Bluff Sentinel (Red Bluff, 1928–1931)
- Morning Times (Red Bluff, 1927–1928)
- Morning Tribune (San Luis Obispo, 1883–1925)
- Morning Union (Grass Valley, 1865–1922)
- Mountain Democrat (Placerville, 1857–1865)
- Mountain Echo (Fall River Mills, 2011)
- Napa County Reporter (Napa, 1857–1889)
- Napa Daily Reporter (Napa, 1866–1867)
- Napa Register (Weekly) (Napa, 1872–1896)
- Napa Valley Register (Napa, 1878–1959)
- Napa Weekly Journal (Napa, 1885–1914)
- Napa Weekly Reporter (Napa, 1889–1890)
- National City Star-News (National City, 1923–1989)
- Needles Nugget (Needles, 1915–1920)
- Nevada Democrat (Nevada City, 1856–1862)
- Nevada Journal (Nevada City, 1851–1863)
- Newcastle News (Newcastle, 1887–1923)
- News-ledger (West Sacramento, 1964–2019)
- Nichibei [Japanese American News] (San Francisco, 1912–1932)
- Northeast Star Review (Los Angeles, 1964–1974)
- Oak Leaf (Santa Rosa, 1924–2000)
- Oakland Daily Times (Oakland, 1869–1877)
- Oakland Tribune (Oakland, 1874–1946)
- Occidental Weekly (Los Angeles, 1952–2015)
- Oceanside Herald (Oceanside, 1892)
- Oceanside Record (Oceanside, 1913–1914)
- Oceanside Register (Oceanside, 1915–1916)
- Oceanside Vidette (Oceanside, 1891)
- Olive Leaf (Oceanside, 1896–1897)
- Organized Labor (San Francisco, 1900–1988)
- Oroville Weekly Mercury (Oroville, 1887–1903)
- Oroville Weekly Register (Oroville, 1885–1886)
- Pacific Appeal (San Francisco, 1862–1880)
- Pacific Rural Press (San Francisco, 1871–1922)
- Palos Verdes Peninsula News (Rolling Hills Estates, 1937–1967)
- Peninsula Beacon (San Diego, 2007–2010)
- Petaluma Argus Courier (Petaluma, 1950)
- Piru News (Piru, 1927–1946)
- Placer Argus (Auburn, 1872–1897)
- Placer County Leader (Auburn, 1898–1902)
- Placer Herald (Rocklin, 1852–1922)
- Placerville Nugget (Placerville, 1901–1908)
- Plumas Argus (Quincy, 1857–1860)
- Plumas County Bulletin (Greenville, 1880–1892)
- Plumas Independent (Quincy, 1899–1945)
- Plumas Standard (Quincy, 1859–1863)
- Plumas Star (Greenville, 1910–1912)
- Pomona Clarion (Pomona, 1970)
- Porterville Recorder (Porterville, 1910–1960)
- Portola Reporter (Portola, 1943–1977)
- Portola Sentinel (Portola, 1916–1917)
- Prensa (Los Angeles, 1917–1922)
- Press Democrat (Santa Rosa, 1875–1928)
- Red Bluff Beacon (Red Bluff, 1857–1864)
- Red Bluff Daily News (Red Bluff, 1892–1970)
- Red Bluff Independent (Red Bluff, 1860–1874)
- Red Bluff News (Red Bluff, 1893–1915)
- Red Bluff News (1927) (Red Bluff, 1927)
- Red Bluff Sentinel (Red Bluff, 1909–1920)
- Red Bluff Sentinel and Weekly News (Red Bluff, 1921–1927)
- Redlands Daily Facts (Redlands, 1892–1982)
- Reedley Exponent (1892) (Reedley, 1892–2001)
- Riverside Daily Press (Riverside, 1913–1922)
- Rolling Hills Herald (Palos Verdes Estates, 1948–1967)
- Russian River Flag (Healdsburg, 1865–1886)
- Sacramento Daily Union (Sacramento, 1851–1922)
- Sacramento Transcript (Sacramento, 1850–1851)
- San Anselmo Herald (San Anselmo, 1912–1946)
- San Bernardino Daily Courier (San Bernardino, 1886–1894)
- San Bernardino Sun (San Bernardino, 1894–1998)
- San Bruno Herald (South San Francisco, 1976–1979)
- San Diego Daily Bee (San Diego, 1887)
- San Diego Downtown News (San Diego, 2009)
- San Diego Herald (San Diego, 1851–1860)
- San Diego Union and Daily Bee (San Diego, 1871–1922)
- San Francisco Call (San Francisco, 1890–1922)
- San Joaquin Republican (Stockton, 1851–1862)
- San Jose Daily Mercury (San Jose, 1861–1862)
- San Jose Herald (San Jose, 1876–1900)
- San Jose Mercury-News (San Jose, 1869–1920)
- San Jose Times Star (San Jose, 1907–1908)
- San Jose Weekly Mercury (San Jose, 1861–1892)
- San Luis Obispo Daily Telegram (San Luis Obispo, 1907–1923)
- San Luis Obispo Tribune (Weekly; San Luis Obispo, 1869–1925)
- San Pedro Daily News (Los Angeles, 1906–1928)
- San Pedro News Pilot (Los Angeles, 1911–1949)
- Santa Barbara Weekly Press (Santa Barbara, 1869–1913)
- Santa Cruz Evening News (Santa Cruz, 1907–1941)
- Santa Cruz Sentinel (Santa Cruz, 1884–2010)
- Santa Cruz Weekly Sentinel (Santa Cruz, 1862–1908)
- Saratoga Star (Saratoga, 1917–1923)
- Sausalito Marin Scope (Sausalito and Novato, 1971–2018)
- Sausalito News (Sausalito, 1885–1966)
- Sentinel (Red Bluff, 1870–1915)
- Shasta Courier (Redding, 1853–1873)
- Shin Nichibei (Los Angeles, 1947–1966)
- Shin sekai [New World] (San Francisco, 1912–1932)
- Shinsekai asahi shinbun [New World Sun] (San Francisco, 1932–1941)
- Sierra Citizen (Downieville, 1854–1860)
- Siskiyou News (Yreka, 1878–1895)
- Sonoma Democrat (Santa Rosa, 1857–1897)
- Sotoyome Scimitar (Healdsburg, 1902–1944)
- South Los Angeles Wave (Los Angeles, 1941)
- South Oceanside Diamond (South Oceanside, 1888–1891)
- South Pasadena Journal (South Pasadena, 1965–1988)
- South San Francisco Enterprise (San Francisco, 1907–1938)
- Southeast Wave Star (Los Angeles, 1968–1972)
- Southern Californian (Los Angeles, 1854–1855)
- Southside Journal (Los Angeles, 1968–1972)
- Southwest News Wave (Los Angeles, 1971–1972)
- Southwest Topics-Wave (Los Angeles, 1941–1972)
- Southwest Wave (Los Angeles, 1930–1972)
- Southwestern Sun Wave (Los Angeles, 1968–1972)
- Star Presidian (San Francisco, 1952–1972)
- Star-News National City and Chula Vista (Chula Vista, 1955–1961)
- State Line Leader (Fairport, 1915)
- Stockton Independent (Stockton, 1856–1925)
- Stockton Record (Stockton, 1890–1904)
- Süd California Deutsche Zeitung (San Diego, 1887–1923)
- Synapse – The UCSF student newspaper (San Francisco, 1957–2013)
- Tamalpais News (Mill Valley, 1919–2020)
- Tehama County Daily Republican (Red Bluff, 1878–1919)
- Times Gazette (Redwood City, 1859–1903)
- Times-Sentinel (Red Bluff, 1935–1938)
- Tocsin (Red Bluff, 1875–1883)
- Trinity Journal (Weaverville, 1854–2011)
- Triplicate (Crescent City, 1891–1924)
- Truckee Republican (Truckee, 1874–1923)
- Tulare County Record (Visalia, 1859)
- Tustin News (Tustin, 1922–2000)
- Union Democrat (Sonora, 1854; 1855–1871)
- Valley Union (Perris, 1889)
- Ventura County Star (Ventura, 1965–2001)
- Ventura Observer (Ventura, 1891–1892)
- Ventura Signal (Ventura, 1871–1885)
- Vestkusten (San Francisco, 1887–2007)
- Visalia Weekly Delta (Visalia, 1859–1861)
- Weekly Alta California (San Francisco, 1849)
- Weekly Butte Record (Oroville, 1853–1887)
- Weekly Calistogian (Calistoga, 1877–1922)
- Weekly Columbian (Columbia, 1856–1857)
- Weekly Colusa Sun (Colusa, 1862–1919)
- Weekly Courier (San Bernardino, 1891–1894)
- Weekly Nugget (Placerville, 1909)
- Weekly People's Cause (Red Bluff, 1881–1914)
- Weekly Sun (San Bernardino, 1895–1905)
- Westwood Pine Press (Westwood, 1998–2021)
- Wide West (San Francisco, 1854–1858)
- Williams Farmer (Williams, 1899–1919)
- Wilmington Community News (Wilimington, 2000–2002)
- Wilmington Journal (Wilmington, 1904–1909)
- Wilmington Press Journal (Wilmington, 1963)
- Woodside World (Woodside, 1959–2009)
