= List of African American newspapers in California =

This is a list of African American newspapers that have been published in the state of California, including both historical and contemporary publications. California's first such newspaper was the Mirror of the Times, which began publishing in the mid-1850s. Although the number of African Americans in California did not exceed 1,100 until the 20th-century, seven African American newspapers were established in the San Francisco Bay Area in the 19th century.

Newspaper examples

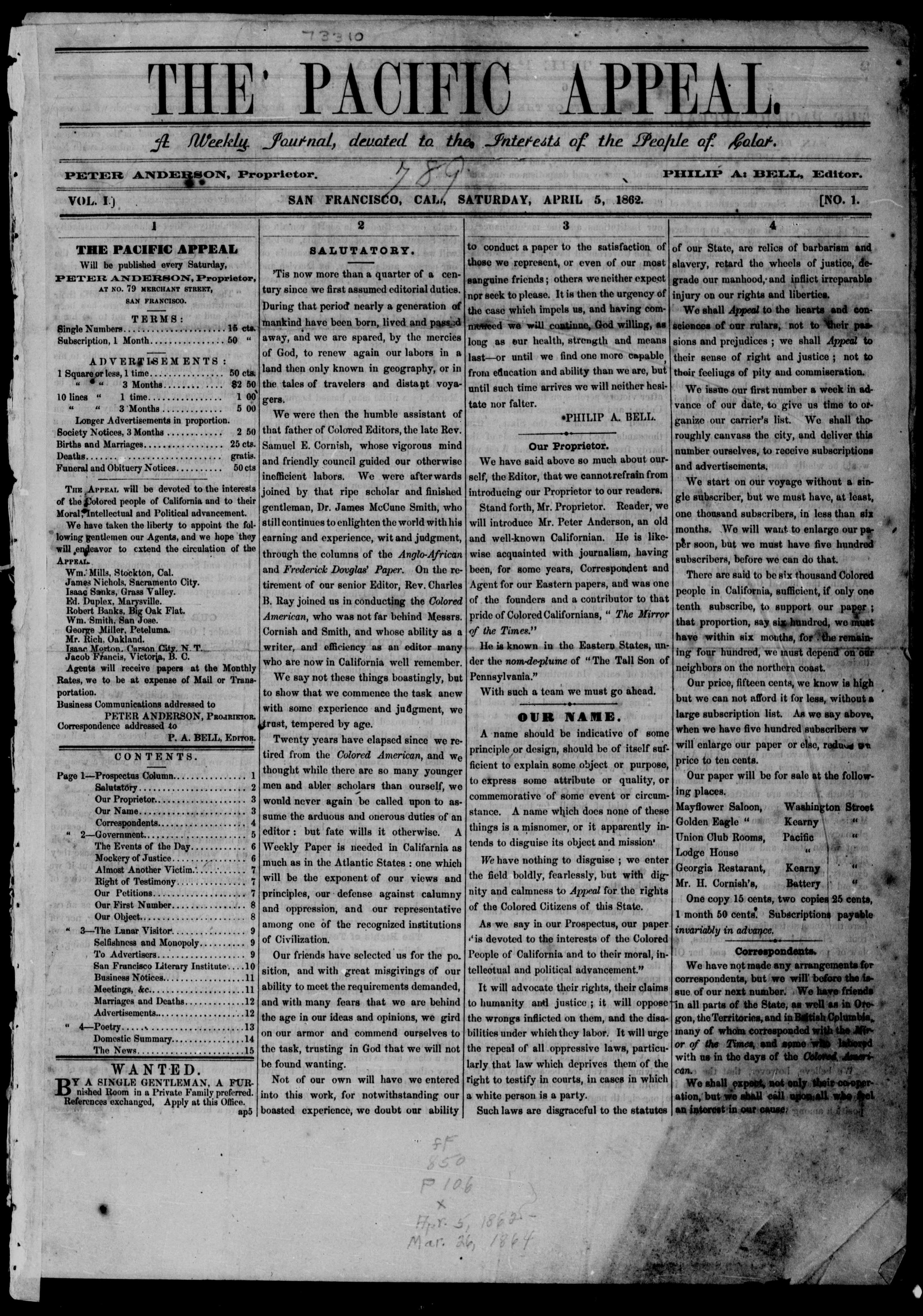
Front page of the first issue of The Pacific Appeal, April 5, 1862

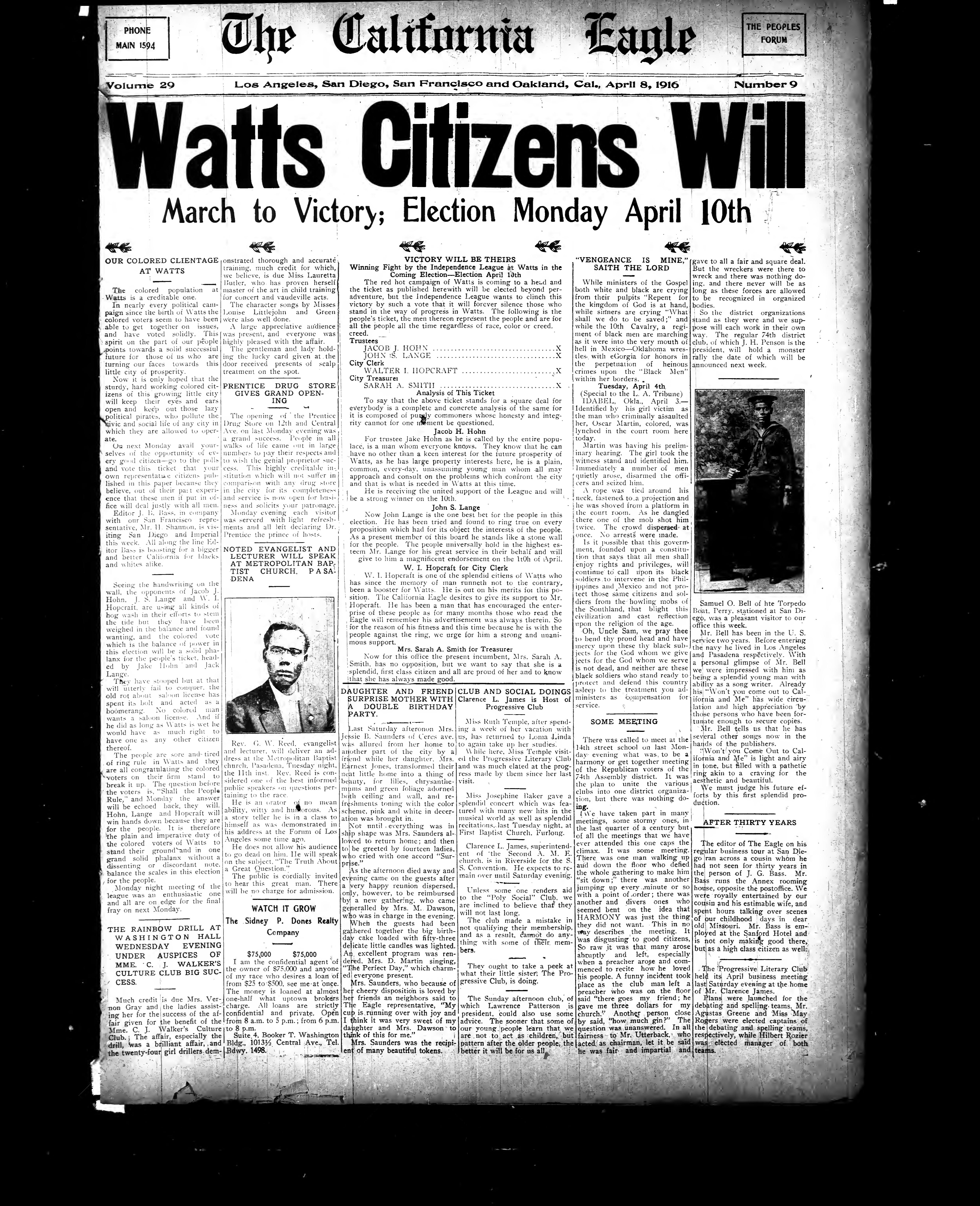
An early African American newspaper in Southern California, The California Eagle, from 1916

== Northern California ==
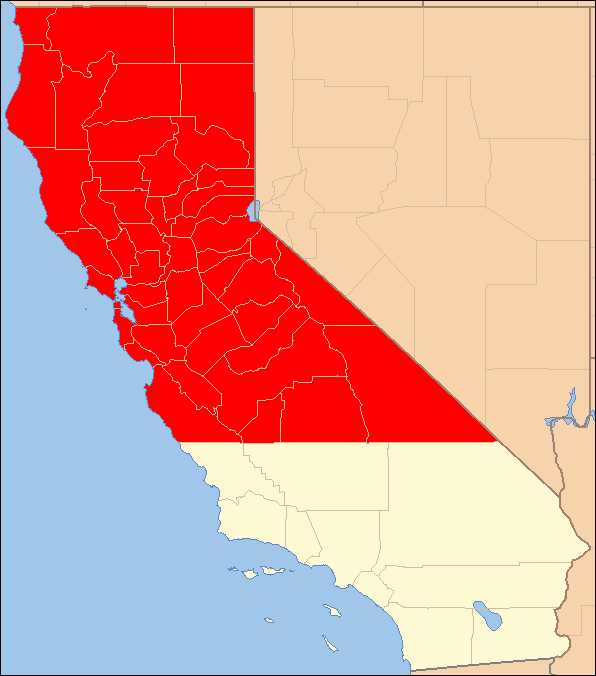
Northern California

The Northern California region takes up the northern two-thirds of the state, including the Central Valley and San Francisco Bay Area.

City	Title	Beginning	End	Frequency	Call numbers	Remarks
Albany	Black Times: Voices of the National Community	1971	1976?	Monthly	ISSN 0006-4289; LCCN sn7801557; OCLC 1772794	
Fresno	The California Advocate	1967	current	Monthly / irregular or weekly	LCCN sn84025882; OCLC 4170883	Official site
Menlo Park	Ravenswood Post	1953	1981	Weekly	LCCN sn97060575; OCLC 37212347	Published by Clarence A. Burley.
Oakland	The Black Panther	1967	1980	Weekly/ Biweekly/ Monthly	ISSN 0523-7238; LCCN sn7805677, sn86016911; OCLC 2258393, 8299802, 5309560, 7654602	
Oakland	Illustrated Guide: The recognized organ of the Colored people	1892	?	Weekly		Official newspaper of the Afro-American League of Alameda County.
Oakland	Oakland Post / Oakland Sunday Post	1963	current	Weekly / Triweekly / Daily / Semiweekly	LCCN sn84025881; OCLC 10546299	Official site
Oakland	Oakland Sunshine	1897	1922	Weekly	LCCN sn84025837; OCLC 10384635, 2772240	Available online; Published by J.M. Bridges.
Oakland	Oakland Times	1869	?	Daily (except Sunday)	LCCN sn85066467; OCLC 13020833	
Oakland	San Francisco Post / San Francisco Sunday Post	1963	Twice weekly / Weekly	LCCN sn84025880; OCLC 10546260		
Oakland	Berkeley Tri-city Post	1985	Weekly	LCCN sn89080104; OCLC 24557477		
Oakland	Western American	1926	1929	Weekly	LCCN sn92069415; OCLC 26753635	Published by S. DeWitt Moss.
Richmond	Richmond Post	1963	current	Twice weekly	LCCN sn84025879; OCLC 10546247	A Post News Group newspaper.
Sacramento	The Forum	1906	?	Twice weekly	LCCN sn92069424; OCLC 26656053	Published by Rev. J. Gordon McPherson. McPherson also published Salt Lake City's Democratic Headlight in 1899.
San Francisco	The Elevator: A Weekly Journal of Progress	1865	1904	Weekly	LCCN sn83027101; OCLC 1567786	Edited by Philip A. Bell
Sacramento	The Sacramento Observer	1964?	current	Weekly	ISSN 0036-2212; LCCN sn7804134; OCLC 3917415	Official site
San Francisco	African American Chronicle	1991	1993?	Monthly newspaper	OCLC 32980723	
San Francisco	The Free American	1866	?	Weekly	LCCN sn95062384; OCLC 33342000	
San Francisco	The Lunar Visitor	1862	?	Monthly	OCLC 33217722	Founded by John Jamison Moore.
San Francisco	Pacific Appeal / The Pacific Appeal	1862	1880	Weekly	LCCN sn83027099; OCLC 2253227	Available online; Successor to Mirror of the Times.
San Francisco	San Francisco Reporter	1942	?	Weekly		Edited and published by W.A. Hambrick.
San Francisco	The Sun Reporter	1943	Weekly	ISSN 0890-0930; LCCN sn84025888; OCLC 2268253		
San Francisco	California Voice	1919	Weekly	ISSN 0745-7057; LCCN sn8307379; OCLC 9384216		
San Francisco	Western Appeal	1919?	?	Twice-monthly	LCCN sn92069416; OCLC 26523454	Edited by G.E. Watkins, formerly a partner in the publication of the Pacific Coast Appeal.
San Francisco	Mirror of the Times	1855, 1856, or 1857	1862 or 1858	Weekly	LCCN sn83027100, 2013254322; OCLC 2753725, 10103020, 10126298, 844389270	Succeeded by the Pacific Appeal.
San Francisco	Peninsula Metro Reporter	1972?	1993?	Weekly	LCCN sn97060576; OCLC 37212352	
San Francisco	San Francisco Bay View	1976	current	Biweekly	OCLC 29924124	Official site
San Francisco	San Francisco Metro Reporter	1972	?	Weekly	LCCN sn92037409; OCLC 26167280	
San Francisco	San Francisco Vindicator	1884	1906	Weekly	LCCN sn84025838; OCLC 2789419	
San Francisco	The Western Outlook	1894	1928	Weekly	LCCN sn84025815; OCLC 10328990, 2775799	
San Jose	The Forum	1908	?	Weekly	LCCN sn92069417; OCLC 26656063	Edited by J. Gordon McPherson.
San Jose	The Phoenix	1891	1892	Daily (except Monday)		Successor to the San Jose Daily Times
Stockton	Progressor / San Joaquin Progressor	1969	?	Weekly	OCLC 20409350	Partially in Spanish.

== Southern California ==
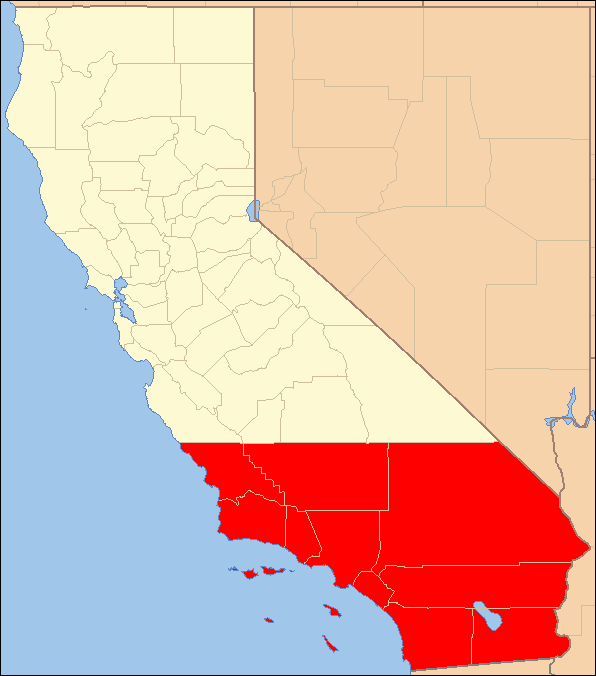
Southern California

The Southern California region takes up the southern third of the state, and includes the Los Angeles metropolitan area, San Diego, and the Inland Empire region.

City	Title	Beginning	End	Frequency	Call numbers	Remarks
Altadena	The Eagle (1973–?) / Pasadena Eagle (1968–1973)	1968	?	Weekly	Pasadena Eagle; LCCN sn96064438; OCLC 35248180; The Eagle; LCCN sn96064439; OCLC 35248735	
Bakersfield	The Bakersfield Advocate	1970s	1979	Weekly	LCCN sn95062214; OCLC 33943775	
Bakersfield	1970	1970s	Weekly	*LCCN sn95061892: OCLC 32828932		
Bakersfield	The Colored Citizen	1914	?	Weekly	LCCN sn93052976; OCLC 27396211	Billed as “The Only Paper Published in the Interests of Colored People Between San Francisco and Los Angeles.”
Bakersfield	The News	1957	?	Monthly newspaper	LCCN sn95062027; OCLC 33246459	Published by Isaiah E. Owens.
Bakersfield	Bakersfield News Observer	1977	Weekly	OCLC 22301605	Official site; Part of the Observer Group Newspapers of Southern California.	
Bakersfield	Outlook / The News Publication (1950s–1961) / The Outlook: The News Publication (1961–1964) / The Outlook (1964–1966) / The Outlook News (1966–?)	1950s	?	Twice-monthly, later weekly		The News Publication; LCCN sn95062028; OCLC 33246718; The Outlook: The News Publication; LCCN sn95062029; OCLC 33246745; The Outlook; LCCN sn95062030; OCLC 33246754; The Outlook News; LCCN sn95062031; OCLC 33246771
Beverly Hills	The Ethiopian Mirror	1993?	?	Monthly newspaper	OCLC 30799620; ISSN 1553-2682	Partially in Amharic. Targeted to Ethiopian-American community.
Compton	Compton Bulletin	1970?	current	Weekly	LCCN sn89080099; OCLC 24124022	Official site
Compton	Metropolitan Gazette	1967?	?	Weekly	LCCN sn88083538; OCLC 17972355	Edited by Mildred L. Hamm.
Compton	Compton Star Review	1927?	?	Weekly	LCCN sn99063223; OCLC 41609623	Extant from 1971–1973.
Culver City	Culver City Wave	1925	Weekly	LCCN sn84025878; OCLC 10537131	Official site; Part of the Los Angeles Wave newspaper family.	
Hollywood	The National Record	1944	1993?	Monthly newspaper.	OCLC 27706934	
Los Angeles	African Connection Newspaper	1988?	Biweekly	OCLC 30798309		
Los Angeles	South End Bee	1934	1987?	Weekly		
Los Angeles	Bronzeville News	1943	?	Weekly	LCCN sn85040329; OCLC 11839843, 24032467	
Los Angeles	Herald-Dispatch	1952	Weekly	ISSN 8750-2038; LCCN sn84025885; OCLC 10568995		
Los Angeles	The California Eagle	1879	1965	Weekly	LCCN sn82016196; OCLC 91188894	Published from 1914 to 1951 by Charlotta Bass.
Los Angeles	Central News Wave	1963?	Weekly	LCCN sn84025862; OCLC 10535001	Part of the Los Angeles Wave newspaper family.	
Los Angeles	Firestone Park News & Southeast News-Press	1954?	?	Weekly		
Los Angeles	Florence Messenger	1939?	1983?	Weekly	LCCN sn84025876; OCLC 10537084	Became part of the Los Angeles Wave newspaper family.
Los Angeles	Florence News	1986?	?	Twice monthly		
Los Angeles	The Illustrated Journal	1956	?	Weekly		
Los Angeles	Los Angeles Black Voice	1968	?	Weekly		see Black Voice News
Los Angeles	Los Angeles Herald	1950?	?	Weekly		
Los Angeles (Pacoima)	Pacoima Herald-Dispatch	1952	?	Weekly		
Los Angeles	New Age Dispatch or New Age	1907	1949	Weekly	LCCN sn85040332; OCLC 11839884	
Inglewood	Los Angeles Bay News Observer	1986?	Weekly	OCLC 31537826	Part of the Observer Group Newspapers of Southern California.	
Los Angeles	The Weekly Observer	1888	1888	Weekly	LCCN sn85040327; OCLC 11839822	
Los Angeles	Liberator	1901	1913	Weekly	LCCN sn2012271153	
Los Angeles	The Pacific Defender	1923	Weekly			
Los Angeles	Pacific Enterprise	1927	Weekly		Edited by William A. Venerable.	
Los Angeles	Los Angeles Sentinel	1933 or 1934	current	Weekly	ISSN 0890-4340; LCCN sn83045393; OCLC 9505770, 21127070, 2328318, 10103210	Official site
Los Angeles	Watts Star Review	1875 or 1929	Weekly	LCCN sn84025886; OCLC 10569077		
Los Angeles	Angeles Mesa Wave	1978	?	Weekly	LCCN sn84025870; OCLC 10535359	Part of the Los Angeles Wave newspaper family.
Los Angeles	Hawthorne Wave	1981	1987?	Weekly	LCCN sn84025875; OCLC 10537051	A Los Angeles Wave publication.; Successor to the Inglewood Hawthorne Wave.
Los Angeles	Inglewood Wave	1981	1987?	Weekly	LCCN sn84025874; OCLC 10537018	
Los Angeles	Southwest Wave	1920	1987?	Weekly	LCCN sn84025864, sn95061657; OCLC 10535081, 33460337	Part of the Los Angeles Wave newspaper family.
Los Angeles	Topics / Sun Wave	1942?	Weekly	LCCN sn84025865; OCLC 10535110	Part of the Los Angeles Wave newspaper family.	
Los Angeles	Westchester Wave	1921?	Weekly		Part of the Los Angeles Wave newspaper family.	
Los Angeles	The Western Clarion	1926?	?	Weekly		
Los Angeles	The Western Dispatch	1921	?	Weekly	LCCN sn92069422; OCLC 26581142	
Los Angeles	The Western News	1889	1889	Weekly	LCCN sn85040324; OCLC 11839789	
Los Angeles	Inglewood Hawthorne Wave	1987?	Weekly	LCCN sn840 25873; OCLC 10536984	Later replaced by Inglewood Wave and Hawthorne Wave; Part of the Los Angeles Wave newspaper family.	
Los Angeles	L.A. Watts Times	1976?	Weekly	OCLC 29744254		
Los Angeles / Inglewood	The Los Angeles Community Circle News / Los Angeles Community Circle Clipper	1989	Bimonthly newspaper	OCLC 26828513		
Los Angeles	Los Angeles Illustrated Reflector	1934?	?	Weekly		
Los Angeles	Los Angeles Tribune	1941	1960	Weekly	LCCN sn83045308; OCLC 9426532	
Los Angeles	The Los Angeles Truth	1935?	?	Unknown		
Los Angeles	The National Negro Press	1970?	?	Unknown		
Los Angeles	The Search Light and Open Sesame	1893	1908	Weekly	LCCN sn85040326; OCLC 11839816	
Los Angeles (or Bakersfield)	United Pictorial Review	1965 or 1966	?	Weekly	LCCN sn95061792; OCLC 32679065	Published by George Scott Jr.
Los Angeles	Southeast Star Wave	1938?	1987?	Weekly	LCCN sn84025866; OCLC 10535172	Part of the Los Angeles Wave newspaper family.
Los Angeles	Southern California Guide	1892	1895	Weekly	LCCN sn85040325; OCLC 11839803	
Los Angeles	Southside Journal Wave	1937?	1987?	Weekly	LCCN sn84025868; OCLC 10535244	Part of the Los Angeles Wave newspaper family.
Los Angeles	Southwestern Sun Wave	1947?	1987?	Weekly	LCCN sn84025867; OCLC 10535202	Part of the Los Angeles Wave newspaper family.
Los Angeles	Tribune Mesa News Wave	1978	Weekly	LCCN sn84025872	Part of the Los Angeles Wave newspaper family.	
Los Angeles	Wave	1958?	Weekly	LCCN sn84025863; OCLC 10535049	Part of the Los Angeles Wave newspaper family.	
Pasadena	The Western Herald	1925?	?	Weekly		
Redlands	The Colored Citizen	1905	1906	Monthly newspaper	LCCN sn96064325; OCLC 35144632	Published by Robert Henry Harbert and H.A. Harroll
Riverside	Black Voice News	1972	current	Weekly	OCLC 23164049	Official site
San Bernardino	Precinct Reporter	1965	Weekly	OCLC 11575723		
San Bernardino	The San Bernardino American	1969	Weekly	LCCN sn89080098; OCLC 24123867		
San Diego	San Diego Voice & Viewpoint	1960	Current	Weekly	OCLC 16829880	https://sdvoice.info/
San Diego	San Diego Eagle	1923?	?	Weekly		
Santa Ana	The Orange County Star Review	1971	1973?	Weekly		

== See also ==
- List of African American newspapers and media outlets
- List of African American newspapers in Arizona
- List of African American newspapers in Nevada
- List of African American newspapers in Oregon
- List of newspapers in California

== Works cited ==
- Abajian, James De Tarr (1974). Blacks and Their Contributions to the American West: A Bibliography and Union List of Library Holdings Through 1970. G. K. Hall. ISBN 9780816111398.
- Berardi, Gayle K.; Segady, Thomas W. (1990). "The Development of African-American Newspapers in the American West: A Sociohistorical Perspective". The Journal of Negro History. 75 (3/4): 96–111. doi:10.2307/3031501. JSTOR 3031501. S2CID 142393523.
- Danky, James Philip; Hady, Maureen E., eds. (1998). African-American newspapers and periodicals : a national bibliography. Harvard University Press. ISBN 9780674007888.
- Junne, George H. (2000). Blacks in the American West and Beyond--America, Canada, and Mexico: A Selectively Annotated Bibliography. Greenwood Publishing Group. ISBN 9780313312083.
- Sloan, Irving J. (1977). The Blacks in America, 1492-1977: A Chronology & Fact Book. Oceana Publications. ISBN 978-0-379-00524-0.
- Smith, Jessie Carney (2012). Black Firsts: 4,000 Ground-Breaking and Pioneering Historical Events. Visible Ink Press. ISBN 9781578593699.
- Snorgrass, J. William (1981). "The Black Press in the San Francisco Bay Area, 1856-1900". California History. 60 (4): 306–317. JSTOR 25158067.
