= Jennie Carter =

American journalist and essayist

- Born: Mary Jane (maiden name unknown) circa 1830
- Died: August 1881; Nevada City, California, U.S.
- Occupations: journalist; essayist
- Spouses: L. J. Correll; Dennis Drummond Carter
- Writing career
- Pen name: Anna J. Trask; Semper Fidelis

Jennie Carter (after first marriage, Correll; after second marriage, Carter; pseudonyms, Anna J. Trask and Semper Fidelis; c. 1830 – August 1881) was an American journalist and essayist who wrote for the California African-American newspaper The Elevator from her home in Nevada County, California during the Reconstruction Era. She used the pen names Anna J. Trask and Semper Fidelis. Her work covered diverse topics, including slavery, racism, women's suffrage, temperance, politics, and immigration, and was widely circulated in late 19th century black communities throughout the American West and nationwide. In the 21st century, with the republication of her essays, her work began to receive wider attention.

== Early life ==
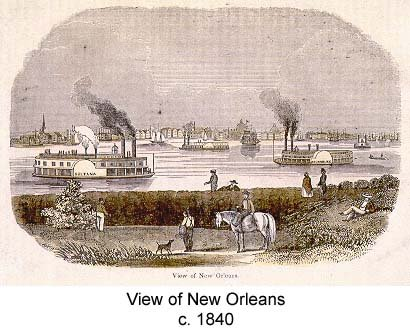
View of New Orleans 1840

Census records differ on whether Mary Jane was born in New York City or New Orleans. She was born a free person of color either in 1830 or 1831 and is believed to have spent her early life in New Orleans and New York and her young adulthood in Kentucky and Wisconsin. Her mother died young, and she was raised by her grandmother. In her essays in The Elevator, she describes a middle-class childhood in which she loved to read and was "passionately fond of music," not assuming "a young lady's position in society until I was somewhat prepared by years." In one incident, she tells of hiding away in the attic and playing alone with her dolls at the age of fourteen when a potential suitor came to see her. Carter had a younger sister, who died of a spinal disease at age ten. Carter later wrote in The Elevator of how bad she had felt because she had hit her sister three weeks before she died, using the incident to advise her younger readers to refrain from anger.

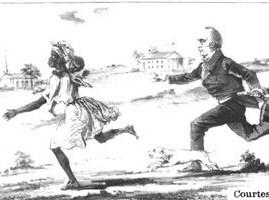
Carter helped fugitive slaves on the Underground Railroad

"In my childhood an old man told me if I would observe three things I would enjoy good health. I will say they proved useful to me, and may to others who read your paper. First, keep the head cool and calm. Second, keep the feet dry and warm. Third, keep the heart free from anger," she wrote.

Carter writes of several incidents in her childhood and young adulthood when she was confronted with the reality of slavery. As a child, she watched while a young friend was taken by slave masters away from his mother. While Carter was living with her baby near Hazel Green, Wisconsin in 1850, a young woman followed her from a speaking engagement in Missouri to arrive at her home with her own baby, fleeing from slavery. Carter hid the woman in her cellar, then drove her by horse and buggy to a Quaker "safe house" a few miles away, and the woman was able to escape to freedom. In another incident, a man who escaped slavery came to her doorstep and Carter was able to help raise funds in the local community for him to continue his journey to freedom.

Before writing for The Elevator, Carter worked as a teacher and a governess.

== Nevada County and writing career ==
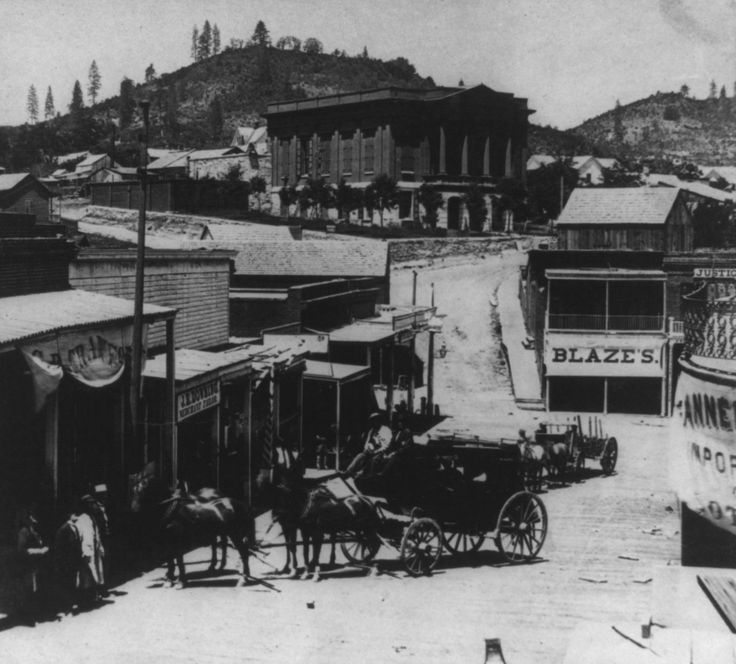
Nevada City, California 1866

Carter moved to Nevada County with her first husband, a preacher named Rev. L. J. Correll, around 1860, before the Civil War. Nevada County was an area in the Sierra Nevada mountains that held several small but growing communities of people who had moved there during the California Gold Rush, including Nevada City, Marysville, and Grass Valley. This county supported the Union during the Civil War and held about 150-300 African-Americans, who worked in a variety of professions and businesses. Some of them were active in the civil rights movement and had helped to organize the California Colored Convention of 1855. While married to the Reverend, Jennie served as Vice President of the Grass Valley Christian Commission. In 1866, she married her second husband, musician and Civil Rights activist Dennis Drummond Carter and began a life with him in a house filled with musical instruments. The Carters lived on Lost Hill, then on Green Street in Nevada City.

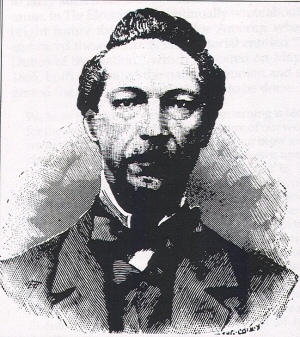
Phillip A. Bell, Carter's editor at The Elevator

In 1867, using the pseudonym Mrs. Trask, Carter wrote to Philip A. Bell, editor of the weekly San Francisco black newspaper The Elevator, offering to write short stories for children to be included in the paper. Bell liked the idea, publishing her letter and a short essay by Carter about her childhood dog in New Orleans in the following issue. Over the next seven years, Carter published over 70 pieces in The Elevator. Her writing expanding beyond stories for children to commentaries on California and national politics, racism, women's rights and suffrage, morality, education, temperance, and many other issues. Later, she began using the pseudonym Semper Fidelis. Since The Elevator had a circulation that extended throughout the American West, Carter achieved regional and in some cases national exposure for her work. She also published in the Philadelphia paper The Christian Recorder.

Carter claimed to live in a community called Mud Hill, a town "a great deal prettier than its name would signify," but biographer Eric Gardner has said Mud Hill was a pseudonym. She also claimed to be sixty years old in her columns but was actually 20 years younger. She wrote in a light-hearted way about herself as a "garrulous" old lady and how she managed to "preserve summer in my heart all through my sixty years," by being "not in the least dignified," telling of living a healthy life and skipping rope and playing hide and go seek with the neighbor children. Her writing reveals her wit and an ability to tell important stories by anchoring them in the minutia of daily life.

When Carter realized that her articles were expanding beyond advice to children to essays on current issues, she wrote:

"Well, Mr. Editor, I see have made a mistake. I commenced writing for the children, and have wound up writing for everybody. May it be excused, with the thousand of others I have made through life."

== Views ==
=== Racism and colorism ===
Carter was quick to attack racism as well as colorism in her columns. "Children, you hear a great deal said about color by those around you, see attention given white persons by your friends that is wholly unmerited, while those of darker skin are treated with cool neglect. Such are wrong, and that you may avoid like mistakes I write this for you to read. Let your motto be, civility to all, servility to none. Those reminders of bondage we must get out of the way as soon as possible; and while we would treat all with respect, we should not talk about color, light and dark, black and white."

Carter used incidents from her and her husband's life to illustrate how they handled the racism they faced. In one column, she writes of how her husband was confronted by whites near Harper's Ferry, West Virginia who told him no black person was allowed to travel after 4PM; in response Dennis Carter calmly offered to beat up 'anyone who laid hands on him.' In another essay she tells of being blocked by a group of white men as she and her husband were out for a walk in Nevada City. "I addressed them in this wise," she wrote: "'Gentlemen, Fenians, illustrious sons of the dominant race of Anglo-Saxons, bold advocates of a white man's Government, supporters of Andy Johnson—will you tell me if a herring and a half cost a penny and a half, how much will eleven pence buy?' And while they were figuring out that difficult problem we passed on."

=== Women's suffrage ===
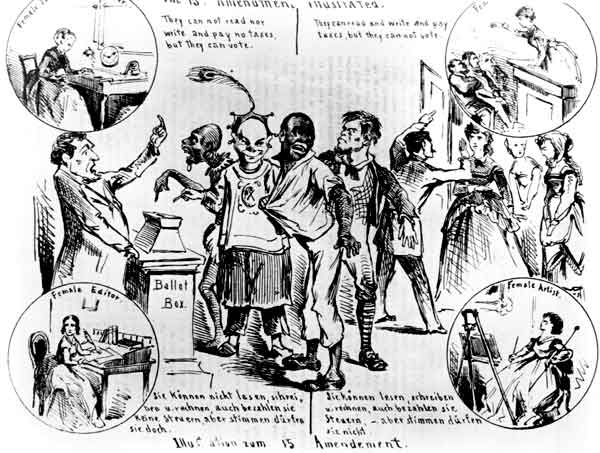
Women's suffrage cartoon 1870

Though she insisted on the importance women played in shaping society, Carter was not a supporter of women's suffrage before black male suffrage, and was critical of white female suffragists who were upset that "inferior" black men had voting rights while they did not. "I think reformers should be careful to govern their prejudices, and if they cannot succeed in all their schemes, not try to pull down the freeman's guarantee erected by a nation's life struggle." "The arena of political life," she believed, "is not woman's proper sphere. She has a higher and more holy mission on this earth. She has an innate purity that shrinks from coarse brutality, obscene jests, horrid oaths, the accompaniments of our election days; and her presence will not restrain men at such times, and women, instead of being the gainer by the contract will be a loser in self respect surely." She and Phillip Bell, who supported women's suffrage, would argue back and forth on the topic in the Elevator.

=== Travels ===
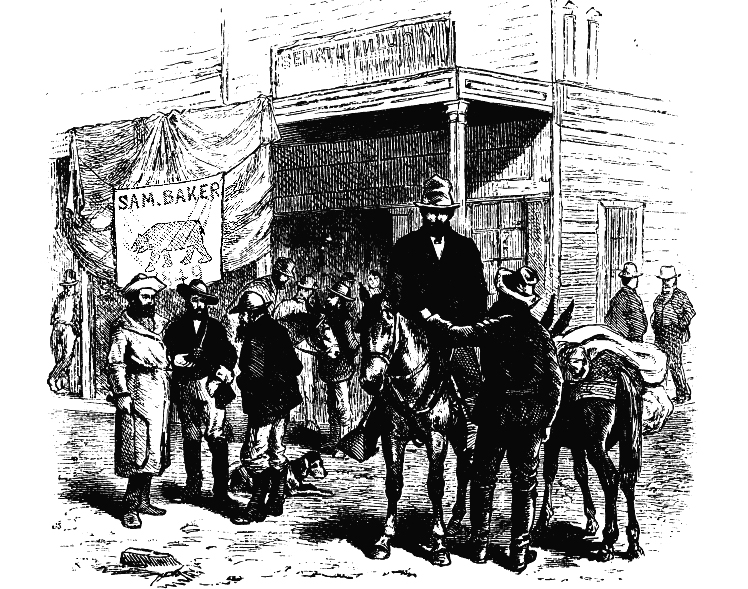
Carson City, 1877

Carter travelled throughout Northern California and into Nevada, sending back her impressions of San Francisco, Carson City, Nevada City, and Marysville. Of San Francisco, she said it made her sad to think of how little sun the people saw there, and was dismayed at the divisions within the city's black community, so small as to be "a mite on a mountain". The five weeks she spent in Carson City, on the other hand, were "invigorating", and "the black people there were doing well, and had pleasant homes."

=== Contemporary events ===
Though she didn't believe in women becoming politicians, she did not hold back from voicing her opinions on the politics of the era, specifically divisions between pro-Slavery Democrats and pro-Union Republicans. Carter also spoke out about another divisive issue, Chinese immigration, siding firmly with the Chinese immigrants whom many Native born citizens, black and white, were trying to prevent from entering the United States. She called upon her readers to "remember those in bonds as being bound to us."

Of the times she lived in, Carter said:

A friend told me the world was shaking. I believe it is, not only the physical world, but the mental world. There never was a time when mind was so agitated as the present, not only in this continent, but the Old World is shaken. Witness the revolution in Spain. Human bondage soon will exist only in history, and religious intolerance be a dream of the past, and mind will constitute manhood, not physical types or color of skin. And happy are they who live in this agitation, and assist in its development! How strange that great lessons of truth must be forced upon the mind by error as the contrast, and a startling wrong perpetrated to ensure right, and a long lethargic sleep to produce a full awakening!

== Death ==
Carter died in Nevada City in August 1881, at the age of 51. Her obituary stated "Sudden Death" of "Dropsy of the Heart.". Her husband Dennis Drummond Carter outlived her and was still living in Nevada City in 1893.

== Legacy ==
Carter's writings began to receive wider critical and historical attention when they were published in Eric Gardner's 2007 book Jennie Carter: A Black Journalist of the Early West. A reviewer in American Literary Scholarship wrote that her work "remarkably complicates assumptions about blacks' access to the middle class in the late-19th-century West even as it adds to and confirms a rich tradition of post-Gold Rush West Coast journalism." Garder notes that his research into Carter helped uncover little-known black communities in the Sierra Nevadas, which had links to larger urban centers like Sacramento and San Francisco. Writing like Carter's that was published in black newspapers, along with similar work by Norris Wright Cuney, Frank Webb and George T Ruby, Gardner said, was an important part of the literary output of 19th century African Americans that was often overlooked. He also notes that because she worked primarily in short essays, she can be compared to Mark Twain and Bret Harte, both 19th century writers of the American West who also used the short essay form in their work. Gardner speculated that her choice of the pseudonym Semper Fidelis (Always Faithful), suggested that for Carter, "writing is a gesture of faith for the community, in the community, writing about topics that need to be discussed but that might not be discussed," a way to "push people to be involved and think about the issues."

The Nevada County historical society has included Carter in their exhibit of late 19th century black pioneers of the Sierra Nevadas. Most of these African-American communities had disappeared by the 20th century, as people left small towns to find jobs in bigger cities.

A reenactment video featuring several Jennie Carter essays was filmed at the Doris Foley Historical Library and the Pine Grove Cemetery in Nevada City.

In December 2023 the Nevada County Historical Landmarks Commission designated the Carters’ former home site at Drummond Street and American Hill Road in Nevada City as Nevada County Historical Landmark NEV 23‑03. The marker notes that Jennie Correll Carter, an influential journalist writing under the pen names Anna J. Trask and Semper Fidelis, and her husband Dennis Drummond Carter, a musician and civil‑rights advocate, lived at the site from 1867 to 1873.
