= Peter Anderson (abolitionist) =

American newspaper publisher, activist (c. 1822–1879)

Peter Anderson (c. 1822–1879) was an African American newspaper publisher and activist who actively participated in California State Colored Conventions during the 1800s. Anderson was also co-founded the newspaper called the Pacific Appeal (1862–1880), which advocated black rights and helped activists network. Anderson and his coeditor Philip Alexander Bell argued often and eventually these disagreements led Bell to split off and create his own paper called The Elevator while Peterson continued with the Pacific Appeal.

== Early life ==
There is little historical record of Peter Anderson's early life. What is known is that he was born in Pennsylvania in about 1822, and moved to California as the Gold Rush ended. He began engaging in the African American community specifically the California Colored Citizens Conventions after starting a tailor shop in 1854 before dying in 1879.

== Activism ==
Anderson along with other African American activists such as J. H. Townsend, W. H. Newby and D. W. Ruggles signed a call to assemble for a convention. The purpose of the convention was to find a way to get their inherent rights and privileges as citizens of California. It was the first of several conventions to happen. Peter Anderson was also the founder of a Newspaper called the Pacific Appeal in 1856. Anderson was also secretary of the executive committee of the Conventions.

== See also ==
- African-American newspapers
- California State Convention of Colored Citizens
