= Black Times: Voices of the National Community =

African American newspaper (1971–1976?)

- Owner: Eric Bakalinsky
- Publisher: Khymme Kyongae, Black Times Publishing Corp.
- Editor: Theodore Walker (1971 to 1972)
- Founded: 1971
- Ceased publication: 1976?
- Headquarters: Albany, Alameda County, California, U.S.
- ISSN: 0006-4289
- OCLC number: 1772794

Black Times: Voices of the National Community was an African-American monthly newspaper published by Khymme Kyongae in Albany, California. It was founded in 1971, and was published until approximately 1976. The publishing location moved to Menlo Park and Palo Alto in later years.

== History ==
Jewish computer entrepreneur Eric L. Bakalinsky was named as the chief executive officer of the newspaper and later served as an editor. Theodore Walker was the editor from 1971 until 1972, followed by Khymme Kyongae (also known as Khymme Bakalinsky) in 1972. It was a monthly publication, with the goal of eventually becoming a weekly newspaper.

It was described as, "a celebration of Black America for all, aimed at creating awareness of developments in the Black Community". The Black Times advertised a 'Subscribers' Satisfaction Director' named Ethiopia Brown, who would address any concerns. The newspaper ceased publication in approximately 1976 (or possibly as late as 1981).

== See also ==
- List of African-American newspapers in California
- Dr. Dobb's Journal, computer magazine occasionally edited by Eric L. Bakalinsky
