= Mirror of the Times =

Defunct African American newspaper in California

The Mirror of the Times
- Type: Weekly African American newspaper
- Publisher: State Executive Committee
- Founded: between 1855 and 1857
- Ceased publication: c. 1858
- Headquarters: San Francisco, California, U.S.
- Sister newspapers: Pacific Appeal
- OCLC number: 10103020

The Mirror of the Times was an African American weekly newspaper in San Francisco. The first weekly edition of the "Mirror of the Times" debuted on Friday, September 12, 1856, and its publication was welcomed by several local newspapers. The paper remained in print until around 1858. It was the first African American newspaper in the state – and possibly in the entirety of the West Coast – and it advocated against racial segregation and for Black civic engagement.

== Foundation ==
The Mirror of the Times was founded by Jonas H. Townsend, James E Brown, Sr and Mifflin Wistar Gibbs in the latter half of the 1850s, with the first edition documented by other local papers as being published on September 12, 1856. Some sources say 1855, historian J. William Snorgrass gives the date as October 31, 1856, and the United States Library of Congress lists the founding as 1857. Townsend and Gibbs founded the paper after the 1855 inaugural meeting of the California State Convention of Colored Citizens, which agreed that African Americans in California should have their own their own newspaper. The paper's motto was "Truth Crushed To The Earth Will Rise Again", and it was financially supported by the California State Convention of Colored Citizens.

== Publication ==
The paper was written for both black and white audiences, and it reported news in both the essay and editorial styles. It advocated against California's Testimony and Witness Laws in 1856 – a set of racially discriminatory laws aimed at black people (Black Codes), which prohibited them from being witnesses or giving testimony in court cases involving white people. Their advocacy failed in 1857, and they responded that one "cannot expect a class of intelligent people [...] to tamely sit down and quietly submit to a law that denies them any protection and [...] give[s] license and security to thieves and robbers to plunder us". By then, the black community of California became disorganized and civically disengaged; the paper attempted to provoke the community to participate more, saying "we have settled down into a state of indifference and lethargy". They recognized that in the 1857 California gubernatorial election, Democratic nominee John B. Weller had won and was hostile to civil rights. A journalist for the paper advocated for more education for black youth, and was discouraged by segregated schools that did not educate black children while being financially supported by black taxpayers. In addition to news, it also reviewed music performances.

The paper circulated throughout the western United States.

== Dissolution ==
Gibbs moved to British Columbia in 1858, and Townsend moved to New York around the same time. Gibbs became the first black judge in the United States, and Townsend became a secretary in the French diplomatic mission in Haiti. The paper likely dissolved that year. According to historians James A. Fisher and Philip M. Montesano, it was the first African American newspaper in the state, and Snorgrass writes that it was the first in the entirety of the West Coast. By 1973, only two issues – August 1857 and December 1857 – had been located. It was succeeded by the Pacific Appeal, another African American newspaper in San Francisco.

== See also ==
- African Americans in California
- List of African-American newspapers in California
