= James Madison Bell =

American poet

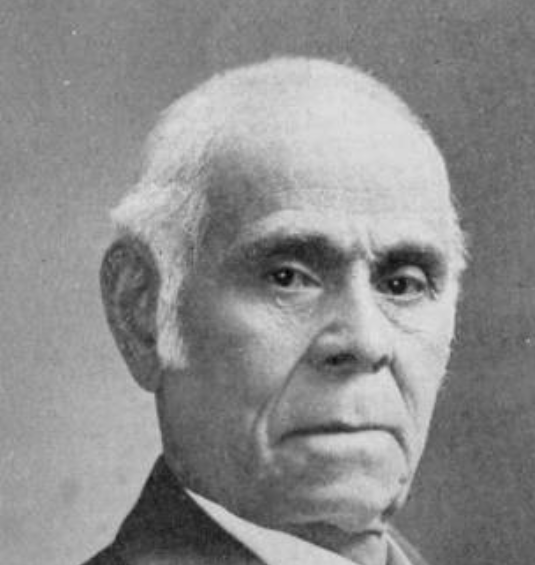
- Born: April 3, 1826; Gallipolis, Ohio
- Died: March 4, 1902 (aged 75); Chicago, Illinois
- Education: Cincinnati High School for Colored People
- Occupations: Plasterer and poet-lecturer
- Spouse: Louisiana Sanderlin

James Madison Bell (April 3, 1826 – March 4, 1902) was an African-American poet, orator, and political activist who was involved in the abolitionist movement against slavery. He was the first native African-American poet in Ohio and was called the "Bard of the Maumee," of Maumee River. According to Joan R. Sherman: "As poet and public speaker, Bell was one of the nineteenth century's most dedicated propagandists for African-American freedom and civil rights."

== Early life ==
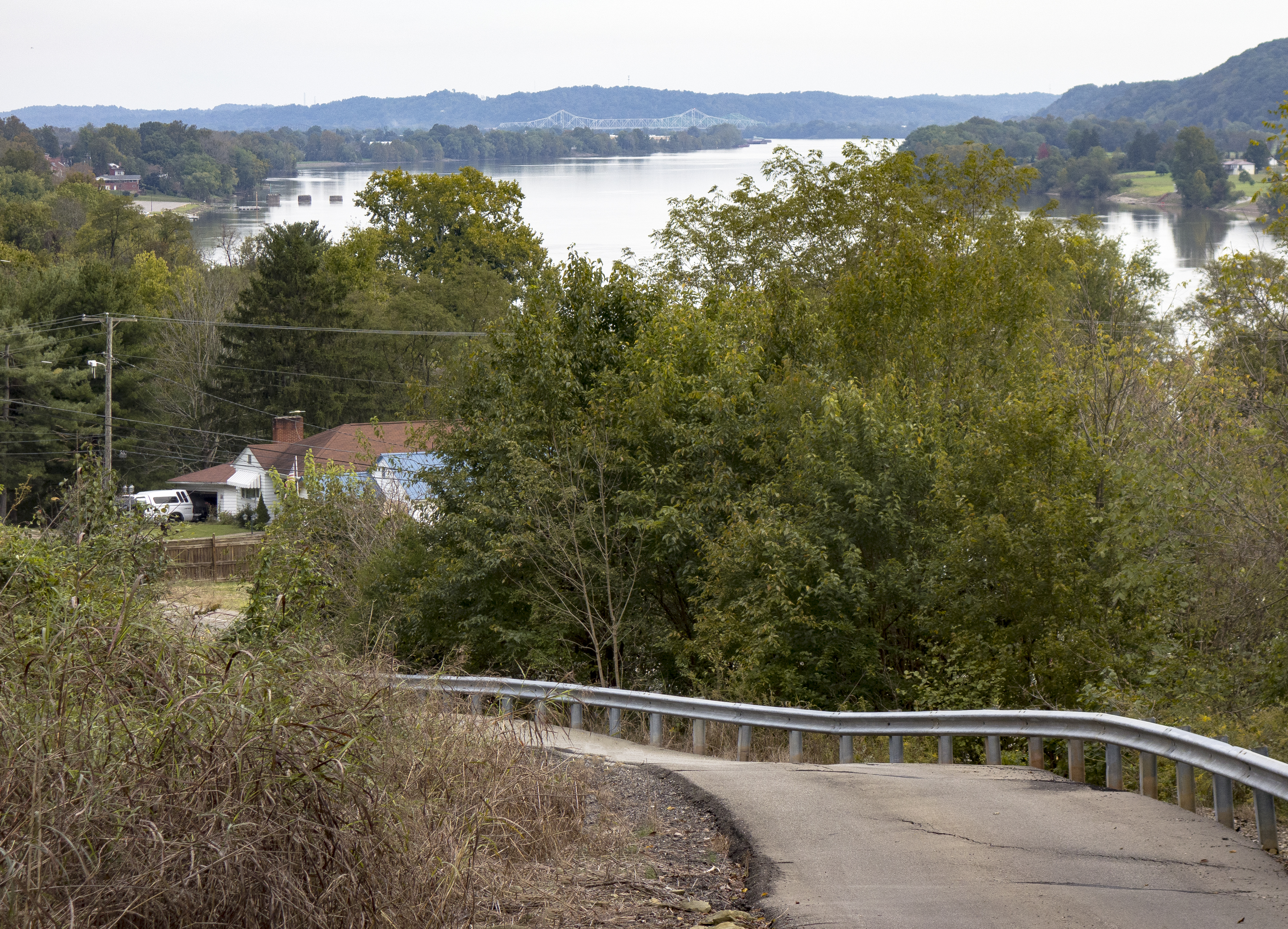
View from Gallipolis up the Ohio River

Bell was born free in Gallipolis, Ohio, on April 3, 1826. Bell attended a school for black children that was run by Elisha Barnes in the Bethel Church (later the African Methodist Episcopal Chapel). (Note: It was not until 1853 that local boards of education were required to teach black children. Ironically, there were better opportunities for a higher education for blacks starting in the 1830s at Oberlin College and Western Reserve College.) He lived with his parents until he was 16 years of age. (Note: He is also said to have been 17 years of age, which would likely have him going to Cincinnati in 1843, instead of 1842.) (Note: Henry Bell, a plasterer, was buried in the Pine Street Colored Cemetery in Gallipolis, who with Thomas Bell donated the materials and plastered the African Methodist Episcopal Church.)

When he was a boy, Ohio was a free state. "Black laws" passed by the Ohio General Assembly in 1804 and 1807 required African Americans to provide proof that they were free and a $500 (equivalent to $10,750 in 2025) bond to show that they could support themselves.

== Cincinnati ==
In 1842, he moved to Cincinnati, where he lived with his brother-in-law George Knight and worked as a plasterer. He worked 12- to 14-hour days, and in the evenings, he attended Cincinnati High School for Colored People The school was established by Reverend Hiram S. Gilmore in 1844 (Note: He worked days and studied nights until he was able to work during the summer and fall and then attend school in the winter. Before Gilmore's school, white people who had endeavored to establish schools were denied rental house and were subject to mob rule that limited the success of schools for African Americans. There were also attempts to school children at an African American Baptist Church.) and it had well-trained teachers who taught English, Greek, Latin, music, and drawing. The students were taught in a proper school building with classrooms and a chapel. The school had a connection to Oberlin College. Bell was initiated to radical anti-slavery viewpoints at the school.

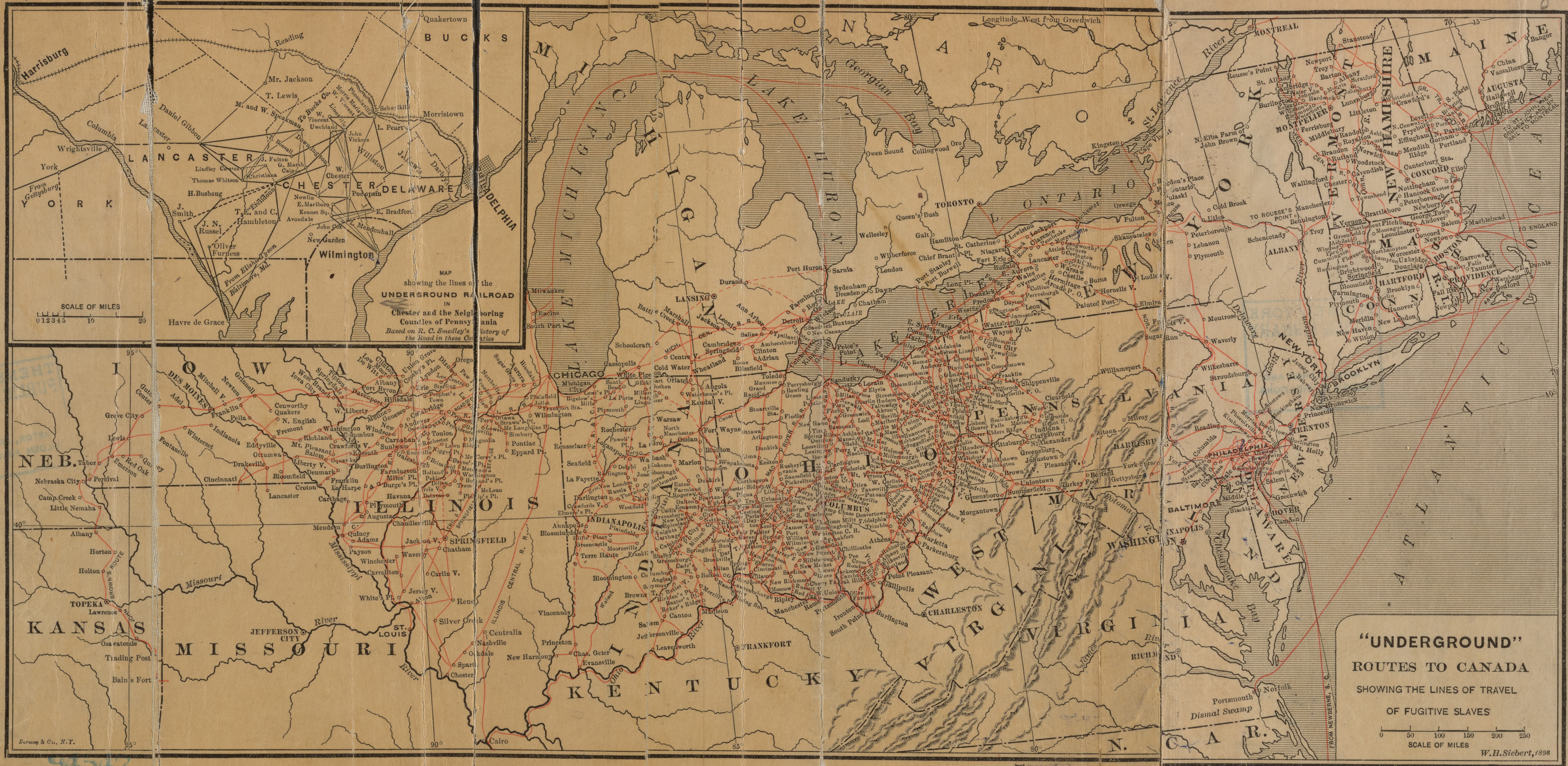
Underground Railroad routes

Cincinnati was on the northern border of the Mason–Dixon line and an important stop on the Underground Railroad. He helped fugitive slaves make their way north through the city. He wrote poetry about ways to improve the life of African Americans, and particularly those who were enslaved. His anti-slavery poems and speeches became popular. He also wrote about the need for educational opportunities and civil rights. He read his poetry and gave lectures in Cincinnati, but his income was mainly derived from plastering.

Bell married Louisiana Sanderlin on November 9, 1847 and they had seven children. Concerned about his safety and that of his family, Bell and his family moved in 1854 to Chatham in Canada, which was one of the final stops on the Underground Railroad in Canada.

== Chatham ==
At the time that Bell decided to go to Canada, he thought he would have better opportunities under the British government than in the United States. The Dred Scott v. Sandford case made it to the Supreme Court of the United States in 1854, which found that American citizenship was not guaranteed for free blacks. He and his family were among and estimated 30,000 people who made it through the United States and into Canada by the 1850s. Many people made it to Chatham, North Buxton, and Dresden in Ontario, where there were a number of trades and businesses that led to a thriving community: education, business, literary and cultural arts, medicine and sport. The industries included a brickyard, gristmill, blacksmith, shoe factory, potash factory, and pearl ash facility. By 1850, one third of the population of Chatham were African Americans. Neighboring towns, Buxton and Dresden, had settlements for African Americans, Elgin Settlement and Dawn Settlement. The number grew as word travelled about the success of the settlements. He earned a living as a plasterer, and he further developed his viewpoints on abolitionism, civil rights, and politics while in Canada.

He became friends with John Brown and supported his raid on Harpers Ferry in 1859. (Note: Brown was introduced to Bell through a letter of introduction by Bell's friend William H. Day, an Oberlin graduate, politician, and abolitionist. Day asked Bell to do what he could do to help him.) He helped identify men who would assist Brown, and helped raise funds for the raid. He was the secretary of the Chatham Vigilance Committee, a group that included Oberlin College graduates, who rescued Sylvanus Demerest who was kidnapped with the intention of selling him into slavery. Bell stayed in Canada until 1860, when he moved to California; His family stayed in Ontario until the end of the Civil War, after which Bell brought them to Toledo.

== California, Ohio and other states ==
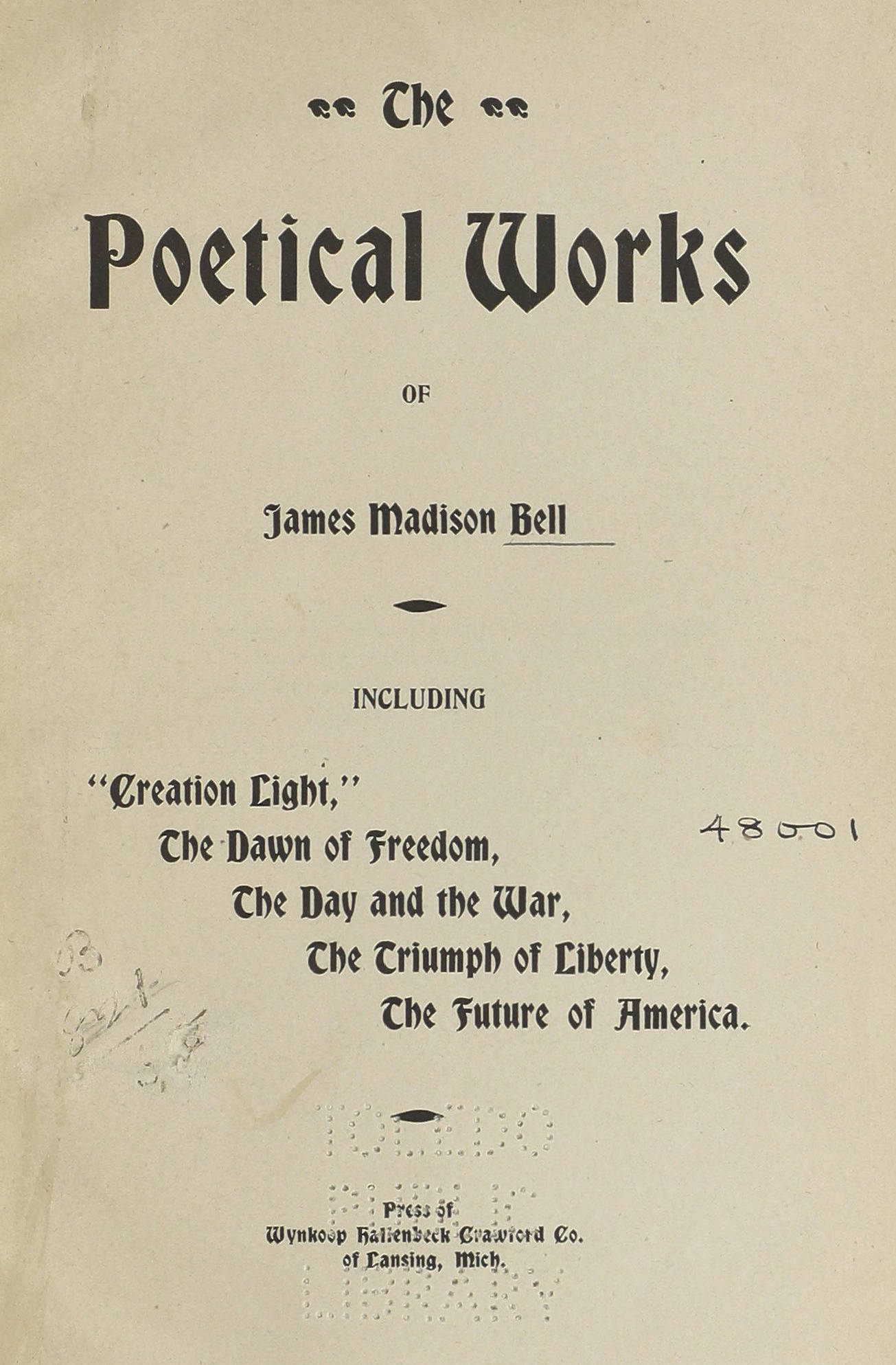
Cover page to one of Bell's book of poetry

In 1860, Bell moved to San Francisco where he continued activism and wrote poetry about abolition. He met leaders who were interested in developing ways to lift up African Americans so that they could thrive. Some of the leaders where people who he met or were introduced to him following his years in Chatham, like John J. Moore of the AME Zion Church and Mary Ellen Pleasant also called Mammie Pleasant, and David W. Ruggles. Other leaders included Philip Alexander Bell, the editor of Pacific Appeal; Darius Stokes; T. M. D. Ward; J. B. Sanderson; Richard Hall; and F. G. Barbados. Bell participated in an African Episcopal Methodist Church convention led by its ministers, where Rev. James Hubbard spoke to the pioneers who fled to California for their freedom. Another was held in San Francisco on September 3, 1863, where he was a steward for the San Francisco ministry. Bell was on the committee on finance and ministry, which resulted in the key note for ministerial education. The group of leaders were “pioneer urbanites” who led a movement for black press, churches, schools, and began the convention movement. He became involved fighting state laws against African Americans and advocate for education for black children.

"Emancipation", "The Dawn of Freedom" and "Lincoln" were poems that Bell wrote in California. He left San Francisco after five years and lived in a number of states around the country. Over that time, he worked as a poet-lecturer and a plasterer.

An excerpt from "The Day and the War"

And thus he played the hero's part,
Till on the ramparts of the foe
A score of bullets pierced his heart,
He sank within the trench below.
His comrades saw, and fired with rage,
Each sought his man, him to engage
In single combat. Ah! 'twas then
The Black Brigade proved they were men!
For ne’er did Swiss! or Russ! or knight!
Against such fearful odds arrayed,
With more persistent valor fight,
Than did the Union Black Brigade!

In January 1864, he attended a celebration for the first anniversary of the Emancipation Proclamation in Cincinnati. He read "The Day and the War" at Platt's Hall, dedicating the poem to John Brown, whom he called "The Hero, Saint and Martyr of Harpers Ferry." His most famous poem describes the significance of the Battle of Milliken's Bend, the first battle that African-American soldiers fought in the war. They fought heroically. The soldier's dedication changed the perception among the military and civilian northerners that in fact blacks did make good fighters; They encouraged more than 150,000 black men to enlist in the Union Army and they earned the respect of the Union.

Bell moved to Toledo, Ohio, in 1865. He then lived in other places, all the while continuing to plaster and give lectures. He expressed his impressions about the "history of slavery, the Civil War, emancipation, and the Reconstruction era" in long verse-orations, often between 750 and 950 lines. Although about a dozen of his poems were short, like the satire, "Modern Moses, or 'My Policy'" Man about President Andrew Johnson. Some of his most appreciated poems were "Lincoln", "Emancipation", "The Dawn of Freedom", and "The Future of America in the Unity of Races, Valedictory of Leaving San Francisco, Song for the First of August". Through his verses, he advised freedmen on their rights and duties as a citizen, human liberty, and to be responsible as free people. According to William Wells Brown, he delivered "soul-stirring appeal" befitting the subjects of his prose and bringing the words on the printed page to life. His audience members had inspired "enthusiasm of admiration". Rev. Benjamin W. Arnett, a friend from church, often traveled with Bell on the lecture tour. Arnett said of his audience members: "Many a young man who was not an honor to his race and a blessing to his people received the first spark of inspiration for true greatness."

He was an active member and lay person for the African Methodist Episcopal Church (AME). He was also superintendent of an AME Church Sunday School from 1870 to 1873 when the church as led by Rev. Arnett. President Chester A. Arthur received leaders of the AME Church, which included James Madison Bell, at the White House in 1884.

In 1868 and 1872, he was elected as a delegate for the state and national Republican conventions, standing firmly for Ulysses S. Grant for both elections. In 1901, he published a book of poetry, Poetical Works.

== Later life ==
His wife and oldest son may have died in 1874. Bell died in Chicago on March 4, 1902, at the home of his son, Andrew Bell. (Note: BlackPast states that he died in 1902 in Toledo.) At that time, his wife and four of their children had died.

== Works and publications ==
=== Poems ===
- A Poem (1862)
- The Day and the War (1864)
- Poem (about the assassination of Lincoln, 1865)
- Valedictory on Leaving San Francisco (1866)
- The Progress of Liberty (1866)
- Modern Moses (1866)
- The Triumph of Liberty (1870)

=== Publications ===
- Bell, James Madison; Arnett, Benjamin William (1904). The Poetical Works of James Madison Bell (2nd ed.). Lansing, Mich: Press of Wynkoop, Hallenback, Crawford. ISBN 978-0-404-00005-9. OCLC 11075041.
- Bell, James Madison (Rev. J.M.) (1874). "A discourse commemorative of John Frye Bell, member of Hopkins high school, Hadley, delivered in North Hadley, Sunday, Oct. 4th, 1874". Memoriam, John Frye Bell. Died August 4, 1874: A Father's Tribute to the Memory of His Eldest Son. Northampton, MA: Gazette printing company. LCCN 34020285.
