= Old Bank of America Building =

Old Bank of America Building may refer to:

- Old Bank of America Building (Red Bluff, California), listed on the National Register of Historic Places
- Old Bank of America Building (San Jose, California)
