= Ravenswood Post (Menlo Park, California) =

African American newspaper (1953–1981)

- Type: Weekly newspaper
- Founder: Clarence A. Burley
- Publisher: Burley Publications
- Founded: 1953
- Ceased publication: 1981
- Headquarters: Menlo Park, San Mateo County, California, U.S.
- OCLC number: 37212347

The Ravenswood Post (1953–1981), was an African American weekly newspaper published by Clarence A. Burley in Menlo Park, California, and served the communities of East Menlo Park (or Belle Haven) and East Palo Alto, California. In the 1970s, Jym Marks was a columnist for the paper.

Other local news publishings included the newspaper, East Palo Alto Today; former newspaper, The Peninsula Bulletin; and the magazine, El Ravenswood.

== See also ==
- List of African-American newspapers in California
