= The Colored Citizen =

List of African-American newspapers

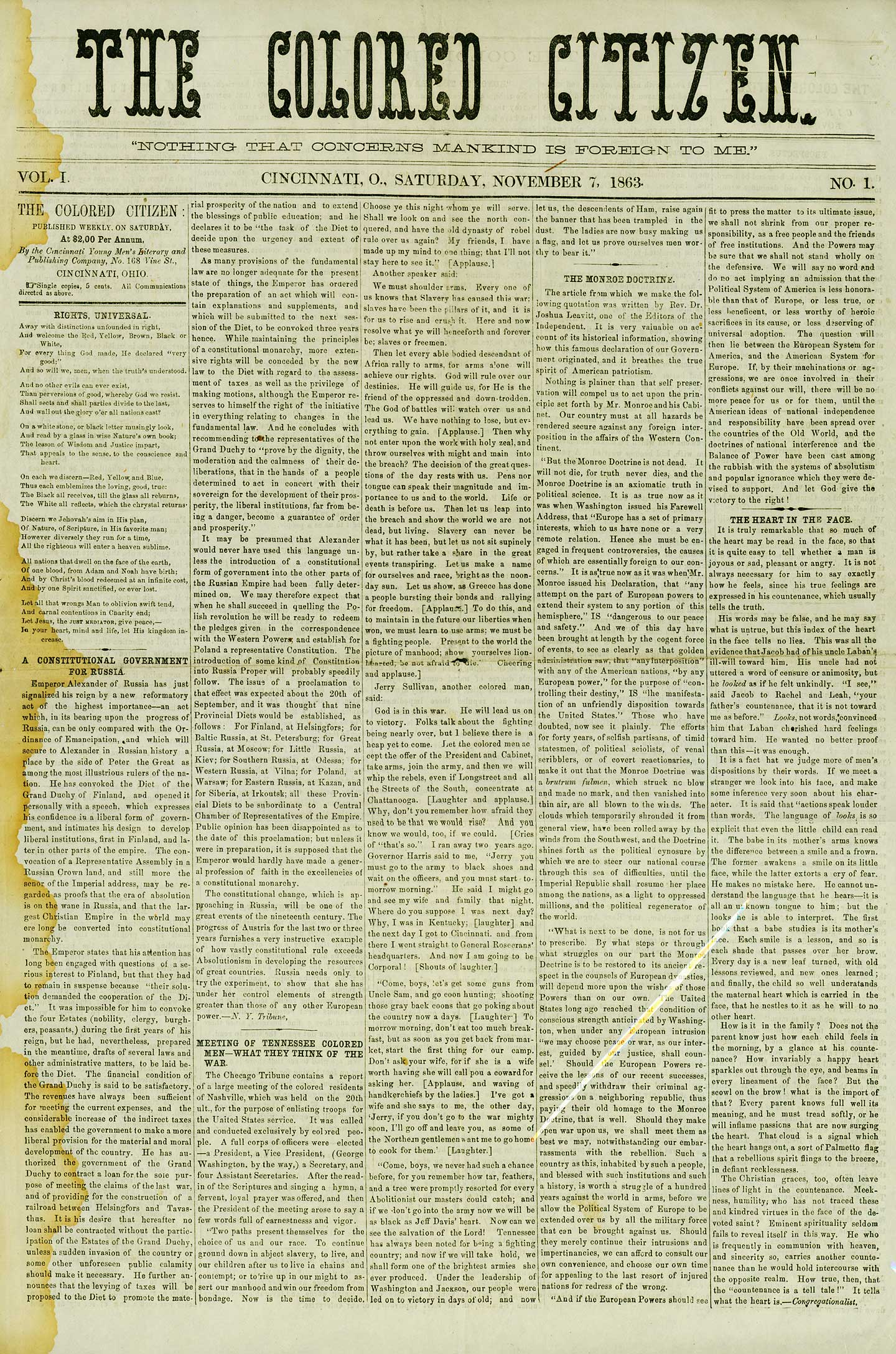
1863 edition of Cincinnati's The Colored Citizen

Colored Citizen and The Colored Citizen were newspapers published for African Americans in the United States. Newspapers using the title were published in many cities including in 1867 in Vicksburg, Mississippi during the Reconstruction era, the state's first newspaper for African Americans. Many of the papers seem to have existed only briefly.

- Colored Citizen (Cincinnati) published in Cincinnati, Ohio in 1863. It was one of two African-American newspapers started during the Civil War and it covered interests of African-Americans fighting in the war. The paper was also commonly called the "Soldier's Organ". It was published by John P. Sampson and stopped production in 1865.
- Colored Citizen (Vicksburg), a newspaper first published in Vicksburg, Mississippi in 1867, created by a Black civic leader, Henry Mason.
- Colored Citizen (Jackson) established in 1870 in Jackson, Mississippi by James D. Lynch of Hinds County. It was the third Black newspaper to be created in Mississippi.
- Colored Citizen (Fort Scott) published by the Eagleson Brothers in Fort Scott and Topeka, Kansas from 1878 to 1880
- Colored Citizen (Montgomery) published in Montgomery, Alabama in 1884
- The Colored Citizen (Helena), a newspaper for African Americans published in Helena, Montana in 1894
- The Colored Citizen (Pensacola), an African-American newspaper published in Pensacola from 1914 through, it is believed, 1958 or around 1965.
- Colored Citizen (Topeka), newspaper published in Topeka, Kansas from 1897 to about 1900
- The Colored Citizen (Lexington) published in Lexington, Kentucky in 1913
- The Colored Citizen a startup newspaper published in Bakersfield, California in 1914

== See also ==
- Dredd Scott v. Sandford, 1857 U.S. Supreme Court ruling that ruled African Americans were not citizens
- Fifteenth Amendment to the United States Constitution, amendment to the U.S. Constitution guaranteeing voting rights
