= Los Angeles Wave =

African-American newspapers

The Los Angeles Wave
- Largest Black editorial in the Western US
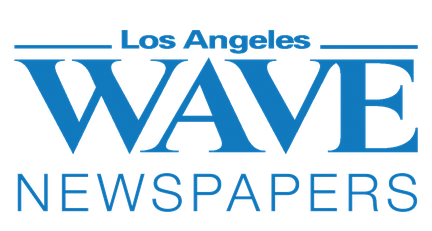
- Type: Weekly newspaper
- Format: Broadsheet
- Owner: Los Angeles Wave Publications Group
- Founder: C.Z. Wilson
- Founded: 1912
- Headquarters: 3731 Wilshire Blvd, Los Angeles, California
- Country: United States
- Circulation: 92,000

The Los Angeles Wave is an African-American newspaper created by C.Z. Wilson, first published in 1912 in Los Angeles, California. It has 92,000 subscribers, which is more subscribers than any other black newspaper. The newspaper group claims to have circulation of 1.2 million serving diverse neighborhoods in the greater Los Angeles area.

== History ==
The paper continues to cover issues that are of interest to African-American readers. They have a section entitled "This Week In Black History" where they cover historic news; especially relevant to Los Angeles readers.

The Wave publications are known as the best way to reach African-American readers in the Los Angeles area.
