= The Modoc County Record =

Weekly newspaper published in Alturas, California

- Type: Weekly newspaper
- Founder: R.H. Stanley
- Publisher: TJ Montemer
- Founded: 1892
- Language: English
- Headquarters: 135 N Main St, Alturas, CA 96101
- OCLC number: 28103482
- Website: modocrecord.com

The Modoc County Record is a weekly newspaper published in Alturas, California.

== History ==
In June 1892, R.H. Stanley (better known as "Heenan") founded the Surprise Valley Record in Cedarville, California. Stanley operated the paper until his death in May 1930. He was then succeeded by his son E. Heath Stanley.

After he was appointed Cedarville postmaster, his wife Mrs. Christine Stanley leased the paper in July 1936 to Robert M. Sloss, who founded the Modoc County Times in 1929 and for the past few years worked at the Lassen Advocate and Red Bluff News. Sloss later moved the paper to Alturas and renamed it to the Modoc County Record.

In February 1952, Sloss purchased the Alturas Plaindealer from Lloyd Rogers who was leasing it from Donald Mathewson, who bought it a decade prior from Mrs. Gertrude French. Sloss merged the Plaindealer with the Record, to form the Modoc County Record and Alturas Plaindealer. The name was shortened to the Modoc County Record in 1960.

In 1979, editor Robert L. Sloss, son on Robert M. Sloss, was sued for $250,000 in damages for writing about a murder in a column titled "20 Years Ago Today." A jury rejected the charges. Rick Holloway operated the paper for decades and was cited or interviewed as an expect on Modoc County for the Los Angeles Times and The New York Times. In April 2024, the Record was purchased by TJ Montemer from Rick and Jane Holloway.
