= National Afro-American Press Association =

American press trade group

The National Afro-American Press Association, formerly known as the National Colored Press Association, was established in 1890 in Indianapolis as a result of African American newspapers emerging around the country. With its creation came the election of Timothy Thomas Fortune, an American journalist and civil rights activist, as its chairman. Some other notable names that were a part of this association for a time were John Mitchell Jr., journalist, politician and civil rights activist, and Cyrus Field Adams, a civil rights activist and newspaper editor and manager, both having a role as president. Even with the increase of black newspapers and journalism, the longevity and success of the newspapers were limited, with funding being a primary reason for that. African-American newspapers allowed space for a racial minority to publish thoughts and promote discussions with other people in their community. The National Afro-American Press Association provided an umbrella for Afro-American newspapers, journalists, and civil rights activists, and gave them a space to continue to fight for rights and discuss their political aims.

== Background ==
During the nineteenth century and into the early twentieth century, newspapers were becoming quite popular and widespread across the United States. Information became easily accessible to almost anyone. The majority of publications were run by whites, and unfortunately during this time, African Americans received a lot of hate, bigotry, and discrimination through these publications, especially in the South. Many Americans were being misinformed because of the bias of these writers.

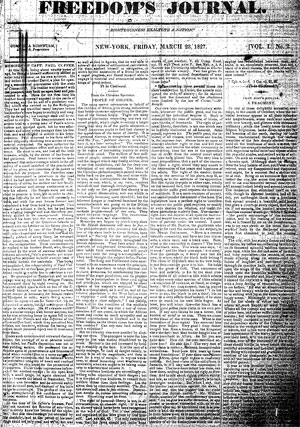
Freedom's Journal 23 March 1827 vol. 1 no. 3

=== Black press ===
African Americans determined to speak out against this hate, and to set the record straight for their race, started their own newspapers and publications. They worked to paint blacks in a more positive light and to protest their position in the country. The first African American Newspaper to be launched in the United States was Freedom's Journal in 1827. It provided information on international, national, and regional current events. The editors of Freedom's Journal voiced their concerns on racial attacks towards African Americans. Freedom's Journal also worked to promote the importance of literacy into African American communities so they would see the value of reading and writing. Despite the illiteracy rates of blacks at this time, it is believed that more than 1,184 black papers were started from 1865 to 1900, with more than 150 that were instituted in 1890 alone. This surge in African American newspapers caused black editors to come together and create their own National Afro-American Press Association.

== Organization and association ==
The National Afro-American Press Association was founded in 1890 in Indianapolis with Timothy Thomas Fortune elected as chairman, in response to the large number of African American Newspapers entering circulation, and provided membership to newspapers and journalists who were publishing "in the interest of the Afro-American race." The Association's largest involvement was in continuing the push for equal rights for African Americans socially and politically and was a vehicle to increase their power and influence over current affairs in pushing back against re-emerging white supremacy and the violence that was being inflicted on black Americans such as through mobs and lynchings. The Press Association was vocal about its position in creating an equal society and frequently presented their opinion on the fate of America if it did not change declaring that "this country cannot exist in peace, security and prosperity where one-seventh of the total population has its rights abridged or denied." Journalism and the National Afro-American Press Association was a way to reach the community and create a strong, persistent place to pursue and advocate for change for a minority group who had been continually "down-trodden" by society.

== Important figures ==
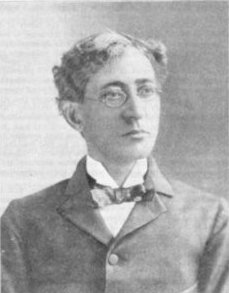
Photograph of Timothy Thomas Fortune.

=== Timothy Thomas Fortune ===
Timothy Thomas Fortune was an African American civil rights activist, journalist, editor and publisher. He became one of the most important and well known black editors in the late nineteenth century. He began his career in journalism in 1880 at a small paper known as the Rumor. In the few years it ran as a publication, its name was changed to The New York Globe. It stopped printing in 1884. After working at The Globe, Fortune founded the Freemen in 1884 where it also had a name change happen in 1887 to the New York Age. When the National Afro-American Press Association was founded in 1890, Fortune was immediately elected chairman.

During Fortune's writing and editing days he spoke out fearlessly against racial issues such as racial segregation, racial violence, lynching, slave labor, the convict lease system, and the economic and social discrimination of blacks in America. He would often get very heated and angry in his writing, using strong, striking words to express his views and opinions. His writings helped him voice his thoughts on some of the most compelling social and political events for the time period of 1880 to 1930.

=== John Mitchell Jr. ===
John Mitchell Jr. was a newspaper editor, civil rights and political activist born as a slave in Richmond, Virginia. With his background, Mitchell was quite passionate about civil rights, especially in regards to the lynchings that increased at the end of the 19th Century. As an editor, Mitchell's motives were described by Irvine Penn, "His forte as an editor is to battle against the outrages perpetrated upon his people in the south. In doing this he has encountered many dangerous obstacles and undergone many daring risks." Mitchell became President of the National Afro-American Association where those passions to continue fighting against the lynching laws persisted, and he hoped to bring about change through the association in bringing people's attention to the problems through promoting an organized and consistent effort.

=== Cyrus Field Adams ===
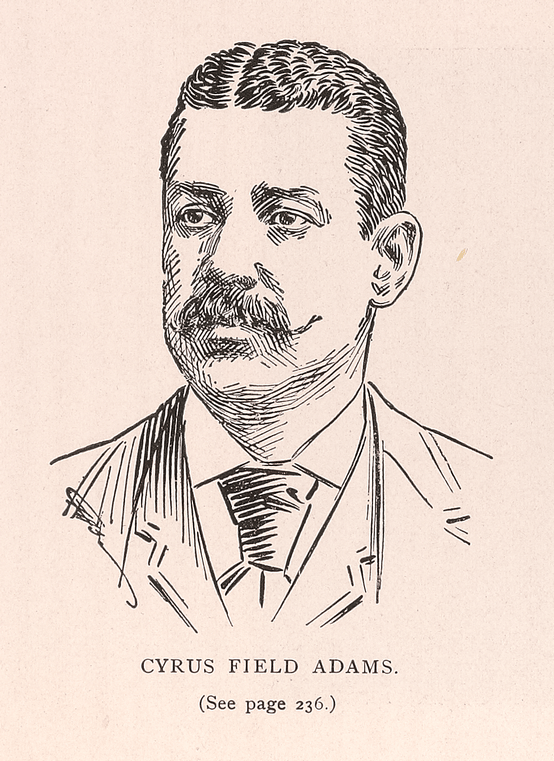
Image of Cyrus Field Adams, September 1900 issue of The Afro-American Council

Cyrus Field Adams was a civil rights activist and teacher, as well as manager and editor for The Appeal newspaper. He used his positions to continue to fight for the rights of the African American race publishing articles and books about the movements and organizations that described the history that was happening around him, some of which were published in the Colored American Magazine. The political position that Adams took and his passions for the discussions surrounding civil rights politics was carried over through his time as President of the National Afro-American Press Association, with meetings providing a place where topics such as those were discussed and talks were made to address the present issues in society and politics.

== Sources ==
- "AFRO-AMERICAN EDITORS: WILLIAM H. STEWARD, OF LOUISVILLE, ELECTED TREASURER OF ASSOCIATION A Protest Against Politics Entering Into the Deliberations". Courier-Journal. 29 August 1900. p. 2. ProQuest 1015984412.
- Page 1 The Appeal. 28 March 1891
- Calloway-Thomas, C. (1979). "T. Thomas Fortune On the 'Land of Chivalry and Deviltry'". Negro History Bulletin. 42 (2): 40–45. JSTOR 44176311. ProQuest 1296810908.
- Carson, Jr, Jack (22 December 2010). "T. Thomas Fortune, the Afro-American Agitator: A Collection of Writings, 1880-1928". The Western Journal of Black Studies. 34 (4): 471–474. Gale A246098323 ProQuest 1018073164.
- "The Editor's Corner". The Colored American. 21 September 1901. p. 12.
- "FOREMOST: Negroes of the Country Gather In Louisville TWO IMPORTANT MEETINGS THE NATIONAL AFRO- AMERICAN PRESS ASSOCIATION CONVENES THIS MORNING The Afno- American Council Will Hold Sessions Later In the Week". Courier-Journal. 29 June 1903. p. 10. ProQuest 1015923693.
- Gonzalez, Juan; Torres, Joseph (2012). News For All The People: The Epic Story of Race and the American Media. Verso Books. ISBN 978-1-84467-111-3.
- O'Kelly, Charlotte G. (1982). "Black Newspapers and the Black Protest Movement: Their Historical Relationship, 1827-1945". Phylon. 43 (1): 1–14. doi:10.2307/274595. JSTOR 274595.
- Thornbrough, Emma Lou (1966). "American Negro Newspapers, 1880-1914". The Business History Review. 40 (4): 467–490. doi:10.2307/3112124. JSTOR 3112124. S2CID 154420806.
- Thornbrough, Emma Lou (1961). "The National Afro-American League, 1887-1908". The Journal of Southern History. 27 (4): 494–512. doi:10.2307/2204311. JSTOR 2204311.
- Page 1 The Washington Bee. 20 August 1892
- Page 1 The Washington Bee. 27 July 1901
