= Sausalito News =

Newspaper in Sausalito, California

- Type: Weekly newspaper
- Founder: James H. Wilkins
- Founded: 1885
- Ceased publication: 1966
- Language: English
- City: Sausalito, California

The Sausalito News was the local newspaper in Sausalito, Marin County, California. It was published under its original name from 1885 to 1958. In 1959, the newspaper became the Marin News before it returned to its original name of Sausalito News in 1965 and finally closing a year later in 1966.

== History ==
On February 12, 1885, James H. Wilkins published the first edition of the Sausalito News. Frank J. Burns was editor and manager. According to the 1887 Rowell's American Newspaper Directory, the paper positioned itself as "spicy, newsy, saucy and bold" and featured articles on "literary, sporting, society, fashion, scientific and telegraphic" topics.

In 1888, Col J. E. Slinkey, owner of the El Monte Hotel, acquired the paper. He was joined by M.G. Coward, who soon dissolved their partnership. In 1894, Slinkey sold the paper to J.H. Pryor and Mr. Parsons. Parsons soon exited the business. In 1897, the "Sausalito News" building was completed, which housed the paper's headquarters and the local post office. In 1905, Pryor's wife inherited $450,000 in money and real estate after the passing of her uncle.

The paper was acquired by William J. Boyd for $3,500 in 1906, Harry Elliot, publisher of The Willits News, in 1925, Frank B. "Andy" Anderson in 1928, and John M. Harlan for $15,000 in 1938. In 1959, Harlan renamed the paper to the Marin News. Later that year, he was indited on tax-related charges.

In 1963, Harlan sold the paper to George B. Thornhill, who previously owned the Tahoe Daily Tribune. In 1965, Thornhill reverted the name back to the Sausalito News. A year later Thornhill was arrested for assaulting his teenage daughter and threatening his other three daughters with a loaded pistol. The News soon ceased.

== Archive ==
Sausalito News is part of California Digital Newspaper Collection, a searchable online database containing more than 600,000 pages from historic newspapers of California. The database is free and open to the public.
