= Old Bank of America Building (Red Bluff, California) =

- U.S. National Register of Historic Places
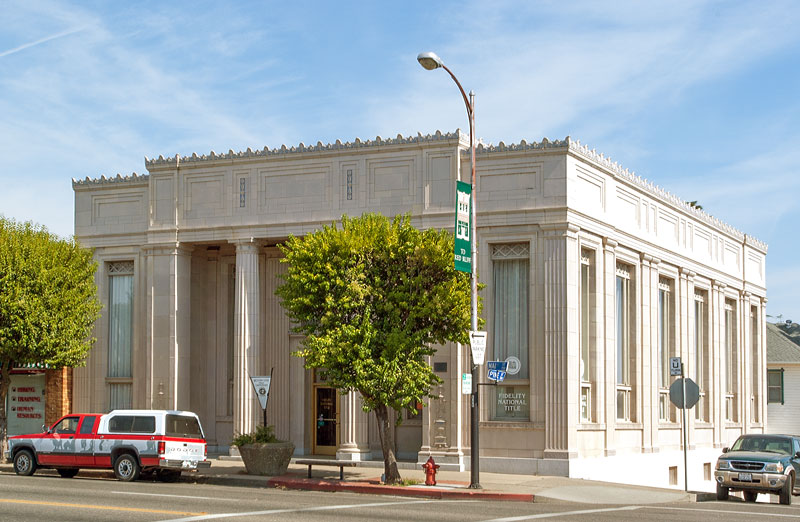

- Location within California Location within the United States
- Location: 710 Main St., Red Bluff, California
- Coordinates: 40°10′40″N 122°14′5″W
- Area: 0.1 acres (0.040 ha)
- Built: 1925
- Architect: Weeks, William H.
- Architectural style: Classical Revival
- NRHP reference No.: 80000873
- Added to NRHP: July 28, 1980

The Old Bank of America Building at 710 Main St. in Red Bluff, California, was built in 1925. It was designed by architect William H. Weeks. It has also been known as The Daily News. It was listed on the National Register of Historic Places in 1980.

Several banking entities had ownership of the building in succession, until it was sold in 1959 with explicit restriction that it could not be used as a bank for at least five years. It stood vacant, instead, until in 1969 it became the home of the Red Bluff Daily News.

In 2016, the Red Bluff Daily News main office is located at 728 Main St.
