= San Bruno Herald =

Newspaper published in San Bruno, California

- Type: Weekly newspaper
- Owner: Alameda News Group
- Founder: George A. Helmore
- Founded: 1920
- Ceased publication: 2004
- Language: English
- City: San Bruno, California
- Sister newspapers: San Mateo County Times
- OCLC number: 33948533

The San Bruno Herald was a newspaper published in San Bruno, California, from 1920 to 2004.

== History ==
In November 1920, George A. Helmore, a WWI veteran from England, founded the weekly San Bruno Herald. In January 2021, Helmore bought the Peninsula News from Horace W. Amphlett, owner of the San Mateo Times, and absorbed it into the Herald.

In November 1931, Harry Elston and his wife Marjorie bought the Herald from Helmore. In February 1947, the paper failed to publish for the first time when the International Typographical Union employees refused to pass through picket lines made by the Teamsters who demanded the paper be delivered by paperboys instead of by mail.

The Herald was acquired by WWII veterans Albert D. Nelson and Walt Gilgert, of Stockton, in April 1947, Walter C. Taylor for $25,000 in March 1952, and Alton I. Cloud, business manager of the Ludington Daily News, in January 1955. Cloud eventually acquired the Recorder-Progress and the Coastside Chronicle. In December 1970, he sold all three papers to Amphlett Publishing, owners of the San Mateo Times. In 1993, Cloud died at age 88.

In 1996, Amphlett Publishing sold all of its papers to ANG Newspapers, an Oakland, California-based subsidiary of MediaNews Group. In 2004, the company closed the Herald, Coastisde Chronicle, Daly City Recorder, Times Weekend and the South San Francisco Journal Enterprise.
