= San Francisco Bay View =

Newspaper with a focus on African-American issues

- Type: Monthly newspaper
- Format: Formerly broadsheet
- Owner(s): Independent
- Publisher: Willie Ratcliff, Mary Ratcliff
- Editor: Kevin Epps
- Founded: 1976
- Headquarters: 4917 Third Street; San Francisco, California; United States
- Circulation: online and print circulation approximately 30k
- Website: sfbayview.com

The San Francisco Bay View National Black Newspaper is an online and print newspaper, published in San Francisco, California. It covers events from an African-American perspective, with a focus on Black liberation and coverage of what it claims to be worldwide racial inequality and political repression. The newspaper's distribution in its print edition extends to the larger San Francisco Bay Area and it is mailed to subscribers, including prisoners, across the United States. Its name refers to the Bayview-Hunters Point neighborhood.

From its founding in 1976, the print edition was published weekly. However, it stopped printing weekly editions in 2008 due to funding shortfalls facing newspapers across the nation but publishes a monthly issue by the first week of each month.
