= Trinity Journal (newspaper) =

Weekly newspaper published in Weaverville, California

- Type: Weekly newspaper
- Owner: Wayne R. Agner
- Founder(s): Henry J. Seaman; David E. Gordon
- Founded: 1856
- Language: English
- Headquarters: 500 Main Street; Weaverville, California
- OCLC number: 28408144
- Website: trinityjournal.com

The Trinity Journal is a weekly newspaper in Weaverville, California.

== History ==
The newspaper was proceeded by the Trinity Times in December 1854 and the Weaverville Democrat in August 1855, which both ceased and were incorporated into the Weekly Trinity Journal. The paper was founded on Jan. 26, 1856 by Henry J. Seaman and David E. Gordon. Seaman disposed of his interests that July to E.J. Curtis, who retired in August 1857.

Gordon operated the Journal until January 1869. He was succeeded by Edward P. Lovejoy and Julius Andrews. Their partnership ceased that November. J.R Felter became a co-owner in January 1870 and left in September 1874. He was then replaced by C.W. Craig, who bought out Lovejoy in October 1877.

On Jan. 1, 1887, Dr. S.L. Blake and Mr. H.R. Given bought the Journal from Craig. At that time 16-year-old August F. Bremer was hired as an apprentice. Bremer bought a quarter interest in June 1895 and became foreman following the death of Mr. Shurtleff in 1896. Blake left and banker Charles Henry Edwards and H.R. Given became co-owners with Bremer in December 1907. Bremer left the paper in March 1908.

In 1913, Wade H. Wilson became foreman at the paper's printing plant. He managed the Journal for 16 years until retiring. Edwards died in June 1927. Two years later editor Wilson gave the paper to his widow Mrs. H.R. Given and Mrs. Eleanor C. Edwards who then briefly managed it until appointing R.A. Greenwall as publisher in December 1929. Greenwall owned the paper for 16 years and was named a Navy Editor by Frank Knox during World War II.

The paper was purchased by Russell C. Kenney in October 1945, Robert E. and Ferne Cook in September 1947, John H. and Vivien Steppling in August 1953, and William F. and Janet W. Asbury in August 1960. Soon after, William Asbury penned an editorial suggesting the town's name should be changed to Shangri-La. The idea was overwhelmingly voted down 43-2 at a local chamber meeting.

The Journal was bought by Ralph H. and Dorothy Costello in February 1962, and husband-and-wife John Martin and Linda Hawk in June 1967. By then the paper had 2,175 subscribers. Hawk became the paper's sole publisher in mid-1978. She sold the paper for $360,000 in April 1983 to Gary Mortenson, owner of the Pioneer Press in Fort Jones. At that time, the Journal had a circulation of 4,000. Hawk reacquired the paper in March 1985 and sold it again in April 1987 to Mark Lanz.

In April 1993, Mike and Sarah Wenninger bought the paper. In August 2001, the paper evacuated its office in Weaverville due to a forest fire in Oregon which was a quarter-mile away from town. The paper was delayed but the building went undamaged. After publishing the paper for 16 years, Wenninger sold it in February 2009 to Wayne R. Agner, formerly the managing editor at the Mohave Valley Daily News.
