= The American Freedman =

African-American newspaper

The American Freedman was an African-American newspaper based in New York during the time of reconstruction. It was the official paper of the American Freedman's Union Commission, and had published articles by Lyman Abbott.

According to the Milwaukee Times, The American Freedman newspaper "served as an outlet to inspire African Americans to use the Reconstruction period as a time for social and political advancement."
