= The Elevator (newspaper) =

Historic newspaper in San Francisco, California

- Type: African American newspaper
- Editor: Philip Alexander Bell
- Staff writers: Jennie Carter
- Closure: 1874
- Founded: April 7, 1865
- Headquarters: San Francisco, San Francisco County, California, U.S.
- Free online archives: California Digital Newspaper Collection

The Elevator was a newspaper published in San Francisco from 1865 to 1898 to express the perspective of the black community. A major focus of the articles were the Fourth of July celebrations that were non-segregated as that was occasionally set aside on Independence day. The newspaper was first published under the slogan "Equality Before the Law" by Philip Alexander Bell.

== Philip Alexander Bell ==
Born in New York City in 1808, Philip Alexander Bell was a journalist and abolitionist politician who was African American. He first began working in newspapers in 1831 as the New York City agent for The Liberator, William Lloyd Garrison's abolitionist paper. In 1860, Bell moved to San Francisco to report on newfound opportunities for blacks there. It was there in 1862 that Bell worked as an editor with Peter Anderson on the Pacific Appeal before moving on to start his own paper after the pair disagreed on a direction to take the newspaper. After the disagreement over the Pacific Appeal, Bell founded the Elevator in 1865.

== History ==
The first issue of the Elevator was published on April 7, 1865. The Elevator's goal was to work towards black suffrage and citizenship as well as improve educational opportunities for black youth in the bay area. Due to the fact that the majority of Californians were opposed to racial integration at the time Bell had to take a strategic approach to advocating for civil rights. He accomplished this by holding a more authoritative tone, avoiding using emotion. He also utilized the patriotism deeply rooted in the black community to win over the whites. However the newspaper was hostile to European immigrants to California, out of economic resentment.

Popular journalist and essayist Jennie Carter wrote for the Elevator under the pseudonyms Anna Trask and Semper Fidelis from her home in Nevada City, California, covering racism, women's rights, education, travel and other issues.

== Legacy ==
In 2013, Alexander was posthumously inducted into the California Newspaper Hall of Fame.
