= Philip Alexander Bell =

American journalist and abolitionist

- Engraving published 1891
- Born: 1808; New York City, U.S.
- Died: April 24, 1889 (aged 81); San Francisco, California, U.S.
- Occupation: Newspaper editor
- Years active: 1830–1889
- Known for: Opposition to slavery, support for black citizenship and suffrage in the United States
- Notable work: Weekly Advocate, Pacific Appeal, The Elevator
- Political party: Republican
- Other political affiliations: Workingmen's (1878)

Philip Alexander Bell (1808 – April 24, 1889) was an American newspaper editor and abolitionist.

== Biography ==
Born in New York City to an African American family, he was educated at the African Free School and became politically active at the 1832 Colored Convention. He began his newspaper career with William Lloyd Garrison's anti-slavery newspaper The Liberator and became an outspoken voice on a variety of social and political of issues of the day including abolition, suffrage, and the protection of fugitive slaves.

In 1837, he founded The Weekly Advocate newspaper, edited by Samuel Cornish. The paper was later renamed The Colored American and co-owned by Charles Bennett Ray. In 1860, he moved to San Francisco where he became co-editor of the African-American newspaper The Pacific Appeal, working alongside Peter Anderson. After the Civil War he founded and edited The San Francisco Elevator during the Reconstruction Era.

In politics Bell was a Republican, but in 1878 he was elected a delegate to an anti-Kearney convention of the Workingmen's Party of California. In 1880, the California State Senate elected him watchman of the gallery.

Bell died on April 24, 1889.

== See also ==
- List of African-American abolitionists
