= Daily News (Red Bluff) =

Morning newspaper in Red Bluff, California

Red Bluff Daily News
- Type: Daily newspaper
- Owner: Digital First Media
- Founder(s): Vincent Ryan; J.W. Lewis
- Editor: Rick Silva
- Founded: 1885
- Language: English
- Headquarters: Red Bluff, California
- Circulation: 7,500
- OCLC number: 27847225
- Website: redbluffdailynews.com

The Daily News is a morning newspaper in Red Bluff, California and Tehama County, California. It was founded in 1885 and is owned by Digital First Media, formerly MediaNews Group. The Daily News also publishes supplements to the publications: Tehama The Magazine, Red Bluff Today, Corning Today, Tehama County Visitor's Guide, and the annual Best of Tehama County readers choice awards. The newspaper has a paid circulation of approximately 7,500 and is published Tuesday through Saturday.

== History ==
In May 1885, the Red Bluff News was founded as the only Democrat paper in Tehama County. It was operated by Vincent Ryan and J.W. Lewis, with Ryan considered an experienced and prominent journalist in the region. By that October, it had expanded to a semi-weekly. In July 1887, Ryan sold the paper to Ed. F. Lennon. A year later Ryan resold the paper to Alexander Montgomery. He quit after a month, writing he was not the "right man for the place; not the kind of material to fill the bill."

John F. Linthicum bought the News in 1892. He previously edited the Marysville Express and at the time of the sale was Receiver of the Sacramento Land Office. L.M. Reppy became a co-owner in 1900, but left the business after a year. Linthicum operated the paper for 12 years until selling it in April 1904 to Reid F. Miller, former city editor of the Santa Rosa Republican. About four months later, District Attorney M.G. Gill sued the paper for libel, seeking $25,000 in damages. The lawsuit was later settled.

In 1905, Reid Miller installed a new Cranston cylinder press. In 1907, he sold the paper to the American Type Founders company, who immediately resold it to John G. Miller. In 1931, the News purchased and absorbed the Red Bluff Times-Standard from W.A. Hornbeck. John G. Miller published the Daily News for 32 years until he sold it in 1939 due to failing health to Fred McKechnie, Jr., a former editor and publisher of the Marysville Appeal Democrat. On March 1, 1950, Marion S. Walker bought the paper from Mrs. Clara McKechnie Parker, who published the paper for the past three years following her husband's death.

Walker operated the paper for 14 years as editor and publisher until selling it on Jan. 7, 1964 to Richard Lafromboise of Ellensburg, Washington. The new owner named James J. McGiffin as editor. In 1968, Lafromboise sold the paper to Donrey Media Group, a chain owned by Donald W. Reynolds. Lafromboise died about a week later. In 1999, Donrey merged 10 of its California newspapers, including the Daily News, into Garden State Newspapers, which was owned by MediaNews Group. Donrey owned a third of the joint venture while MediaNews owned the majority stake.

== Building ==
The Old Bank of America Building (1925) at 710 Main St. in Red Bluff became the home of the Daily News in 1969. The building was designed by architect William H. Weeks and is listed on the National Register of Historic Places. In 2016, the Red Bluff Daily News main office is located at 728 Main St. In 2021, the News left that address and has gone virtual, with no brick and mortar office.
