= Black Voice News =

Black American online newspaper

- Owner: Brown Publishing Co. LLC
- Founded: 1972; 54 years ago
- Language: English
- City: Riverside, California
- Country: United States
- Website: www.blackvoicenews.com

Black Voice News is the first Black American online news publication on the West Coast of the United States. Founded in 1972 as a print newspaper, it was still active (as of 2020) and had moved to online publication.

== History ==
- 1972 – The Black Voice News is started by students at University of California, Riverside
- 1980 – The paper is purchased by Hardy Brown and Cheryl Brown and Brown Publishing Company is formed.
- 1999 – September 20, https://www.blackvoicenews.com is registered and the online publication is launched.
- 2013 – Dr. Paulette Brown-Hinds takes over as Publisher
- 2015 – BVN 2.0 is launched as https://www.blackvoicenews.com expands its presence across California
