= African American newspapers =

Newspapers serving African American communities

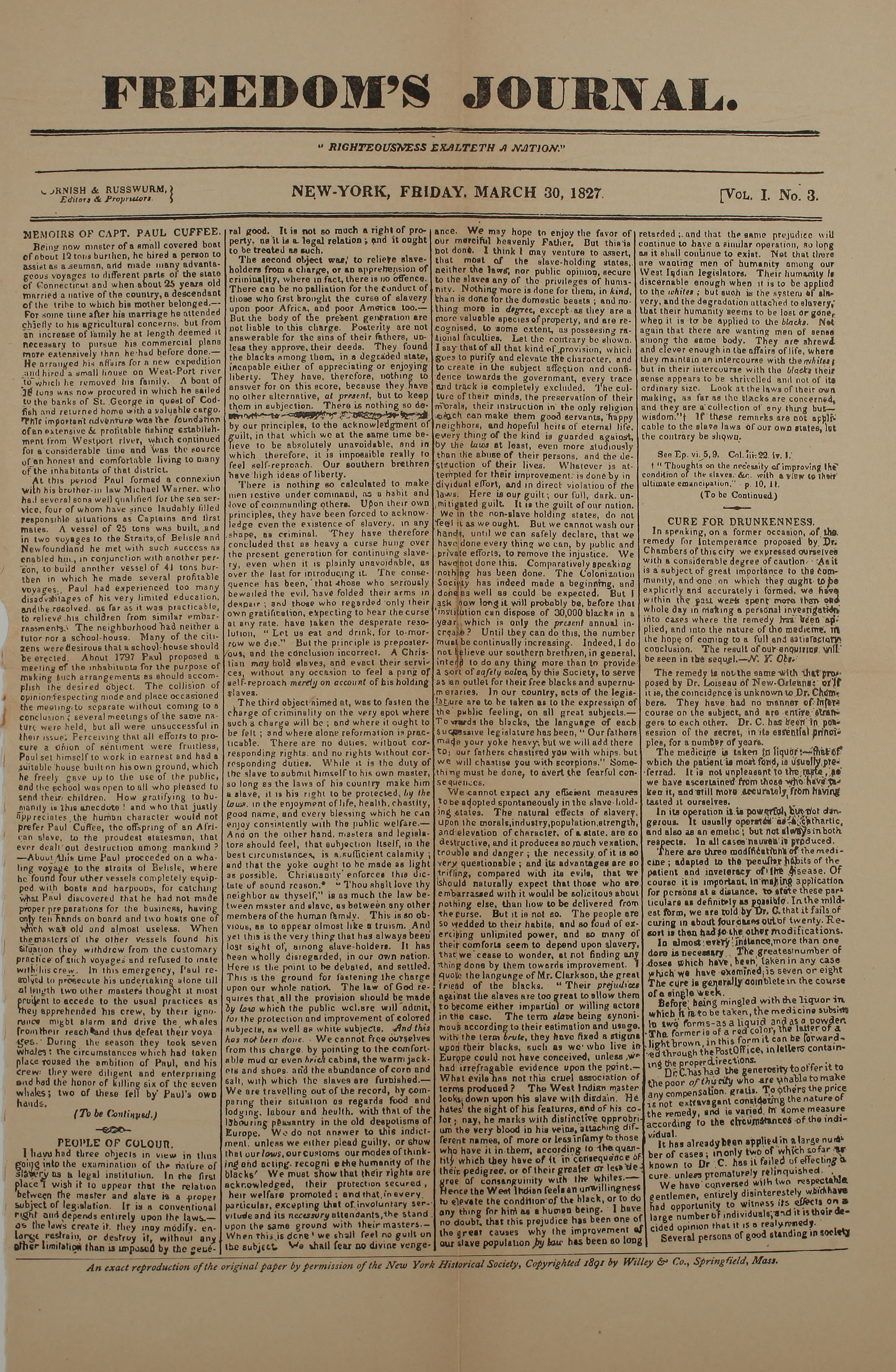
Freedom's Journal, considered the first African American newspaper published within the United States

African American newspapers (also known as the Black press or Black newspapers) are news publications in the United States serving African American communities. Samuel Cornish and John Brown Russwurm started the first African American periodical, Freedom's Journal, in 1827. During the antebellum period, other African American newspapers sprang up, such as The North Star, founded in 1847 by Frederick Douglass.

As African Americans moved to urban centers beginning during the Reconstruction era, virtually every large city with a significant African American population had weekly or monthly newspapers directed towards African Americans. These newspapers gained audiences outside African American circles. Demographic changes continued with the Great Migration from southern states to northern states from 1910 to 1930 and during the Second Great Migration from 1941 to 1970. In the 21st century, papers (like newspapers of all sorts) have shut down, merged, or shrunk in response to the dominance of the Internet in terms of providing free news and information, and providing cheap advertising.

== History ==
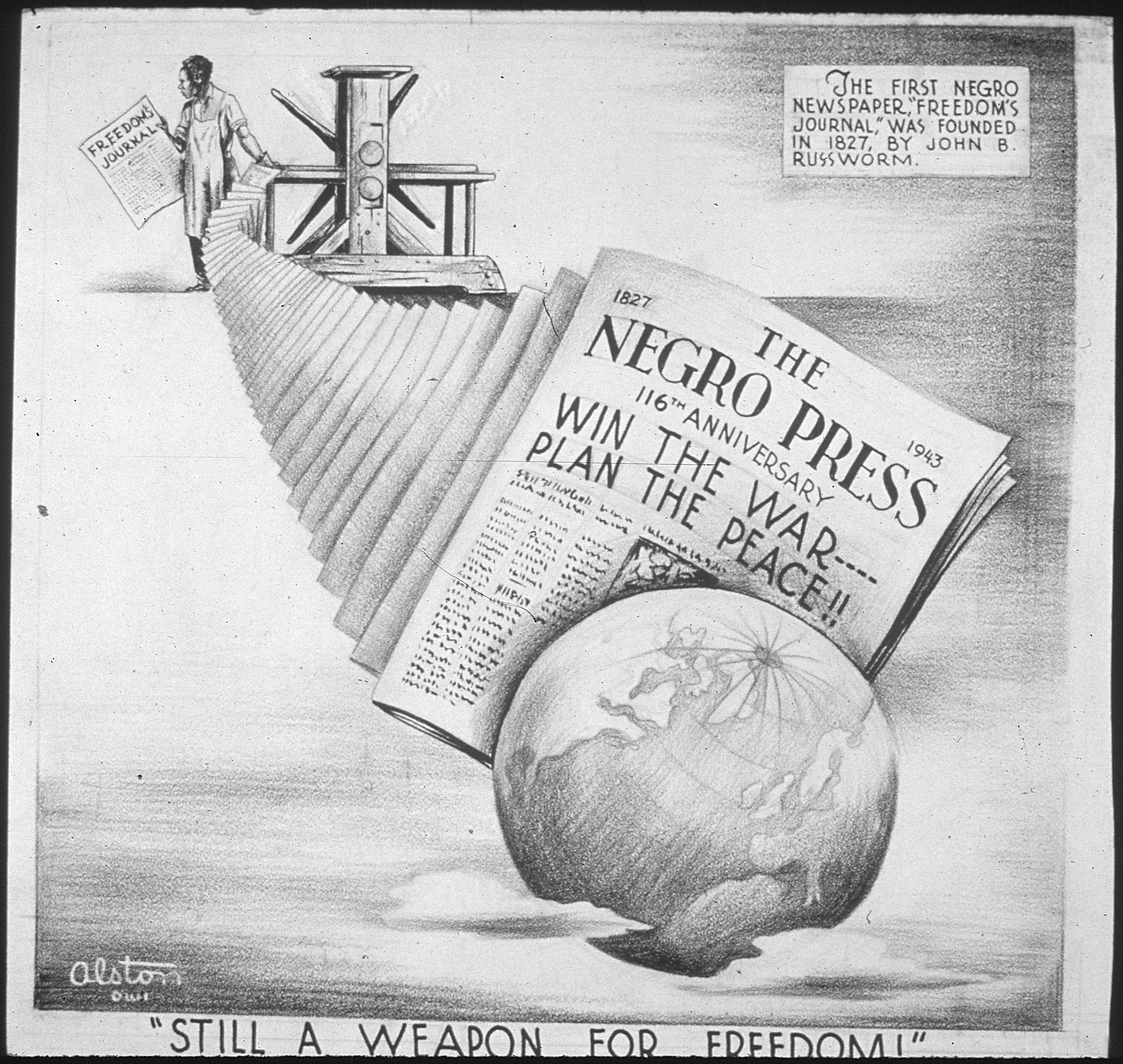
Charles Alston's illustration celebrating the 116th anniversary of African American newspapers

=== Origins ===
Most of the early African American publications, such as Freedom's Journal, were published in the North and then distributed, often covertly, to African Americans throughout the country. The newspaper often covered regional, national, and international news. It also addressed the issues of American slavery and The American Colonization Society which involved the repatriation of free blacks back to Africa.

=== 19th century ===
Some notable black newspapers of the 19th century were Freedom's Journal (1827–1829), Philip Alexander Bell's Colored American (1837–1841), the North Star (1847–1860), the National Era, The Aliened American in Cleveland (1853–1855), Frederick Douglass' Paper (1851–1863), the Douglass Monthly (1859–1863), The People's Advocate, founded by John Wesley Cromwell and Travers Benjamin Pinn (1876–1891), and The Christian Recorder (1861–1902).

In the 1860s, the newspapers The Elevator and the Pacific Appeal emerged in California as a result of black participation in the Gold Rush. The American Freedman was a New York-based paper that served as an outlet to inspire African Americans to use the Reconstruction era as a time for social and political advancement. This newspaper did so by publishing articles that referenced African American mobilization during that era that had not only local support but had gained support from the global community as well. The name The Colored Citizen was used by various newspapers established in the 1860s and later.

In 1879, John J. Neimore founded The California Owl, later renamed The California Eagle. The Los Angeles-based publication was one of the oldest African American newspapers in the West.

Pdf of the 1892 book The Afro American Press and its Editors by Irvine Garland Penn

In 1885, Daniel Rudd formed the Ohio Tribune, said to be the first newspaper "printed by and for Black Americans", which he later expanded into the American Catholic Tribune, purported to the first Black-owned national newspaper. The Cleveland Gazette was established in the 1880s and continued for decades.

The National Afro-American Press Association was formed in 1890 in Indianapolis, Indiana.

In 1894, Josephine St. Pierre Ruffin founded The Woman's Era, the first nationally distributed newspaper published by and for African American women in the United States. The Woman's Era began as the official publication of the National Association of Colored Women, and grew in import and impact with the founding of the National Federation of Afro American Women in 1895. It was also one of the first newspapers, along with the National Association Notes, to create journalism career opportunities for Southern black women.

Many African American newspapers struggled to keep their circulation going due to the low rate of literacy among African Americans. Many freed African Americans had low incomes and could not afford to purchase subscriptions but shared the publications with one another.

=== 20th century ===
African American newspapers flourished in the major cities, with publishers playing a major role in politics and business affairs. By the 20th century, daily papers appeared in Norfolk, Chicago, Baltimore and Washington, D.C. Representative leaders included Robert Sengstacke Abbott (1870–1940) and John H. Sengstacke (1912–1997), publishers of the Chicago Defender; John Mitchell Jr. (1863–1929), editor of the Richmond Planet and president of the National Afro-American Press Association; Anthony Overton (1865–1946), publisher of the Chicago Bee; Garth C. Reeves Sr. (1919–2019), publisher emeritus of the Miami Times; and Robert Lee Vann (1879–1940), the publisher and editor of the Pittsburgh Courier.

In the 1940s, the number of newspapers grew from 150 to 250. At the end of World War II, the black newspapers with the highest circulation in the United States were the Pittsburgh Courier, the Afro-American, the Chicago Defender, and the Norfolk Journal and Guide.

From 1881 to 1909, the National Colored Press Association (American Press Association) operated as a trade association. The National Negro Business League-affiliated National Negro Press Association filled that role from 1909 to 1939. The Chicago-based Associated Negro Press (1919–1964) was a subscription news agency "with correspondents and stringers in all major centers of black population". In 1940, Sengstacke led African American newspaper publishers in forming the trade association known in the 21st century as the National Newspaper Publishers Association.

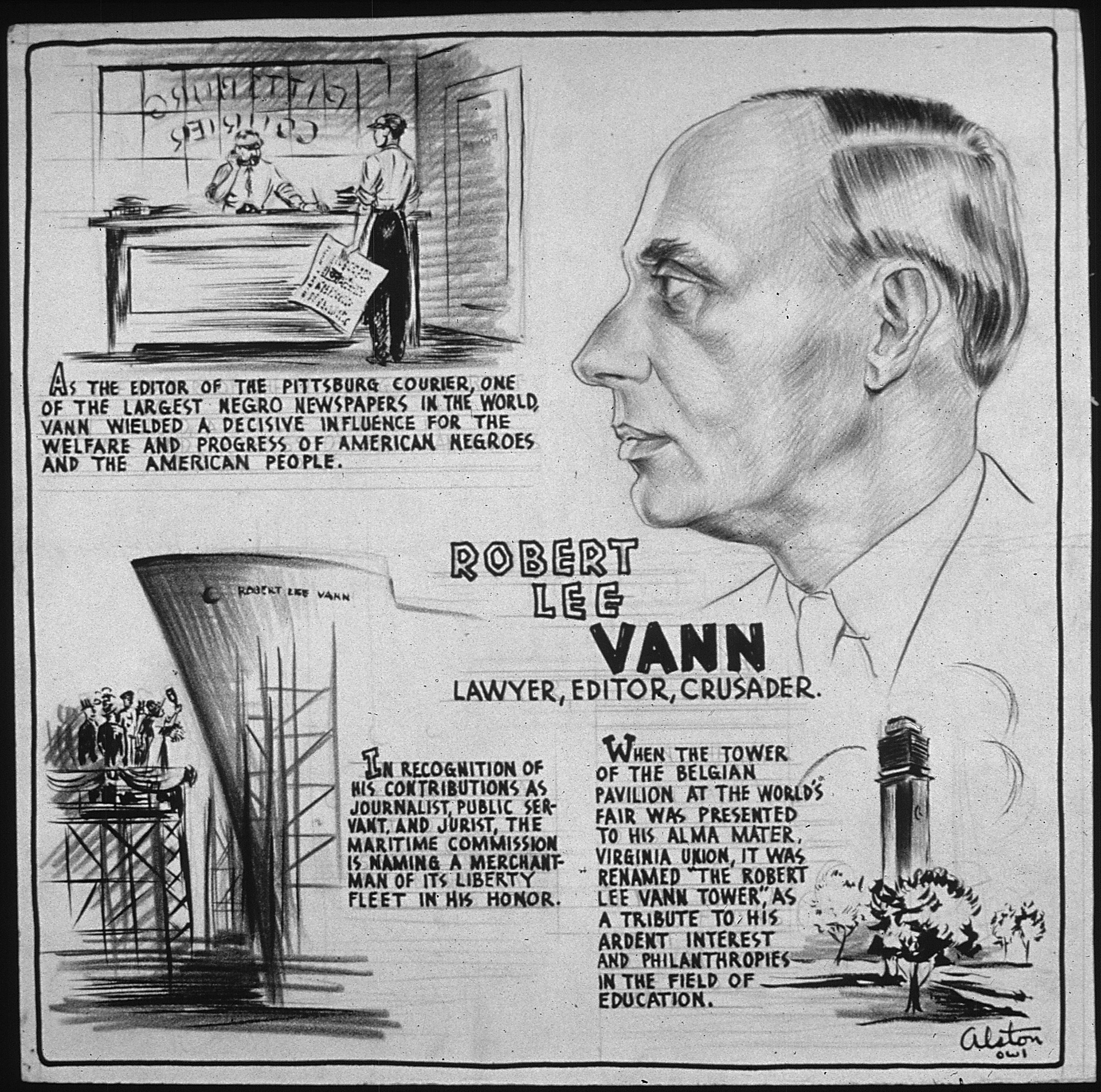
Poster from the U.S. Office of War Information, 1943

During the 1930s and 1940s, the Black southern press both aided and, to an extent, hindered the equal payment movement of Black teachers in the southern United States. Newspaper coverage of the movement served to publicize the cause. However, the way in which the movement was portrayed, and those whose struggles were highlighted in the press, displaced Black women to the background of a movement they spearheaded. A woman's issue, and a Black woman's issue, was being covered by the press. However, reporting diminished the roles of the women fighting for teacher salary equalization and “diminished the presence of the teachers’ salary equalization fight” in national debates over equality in education.

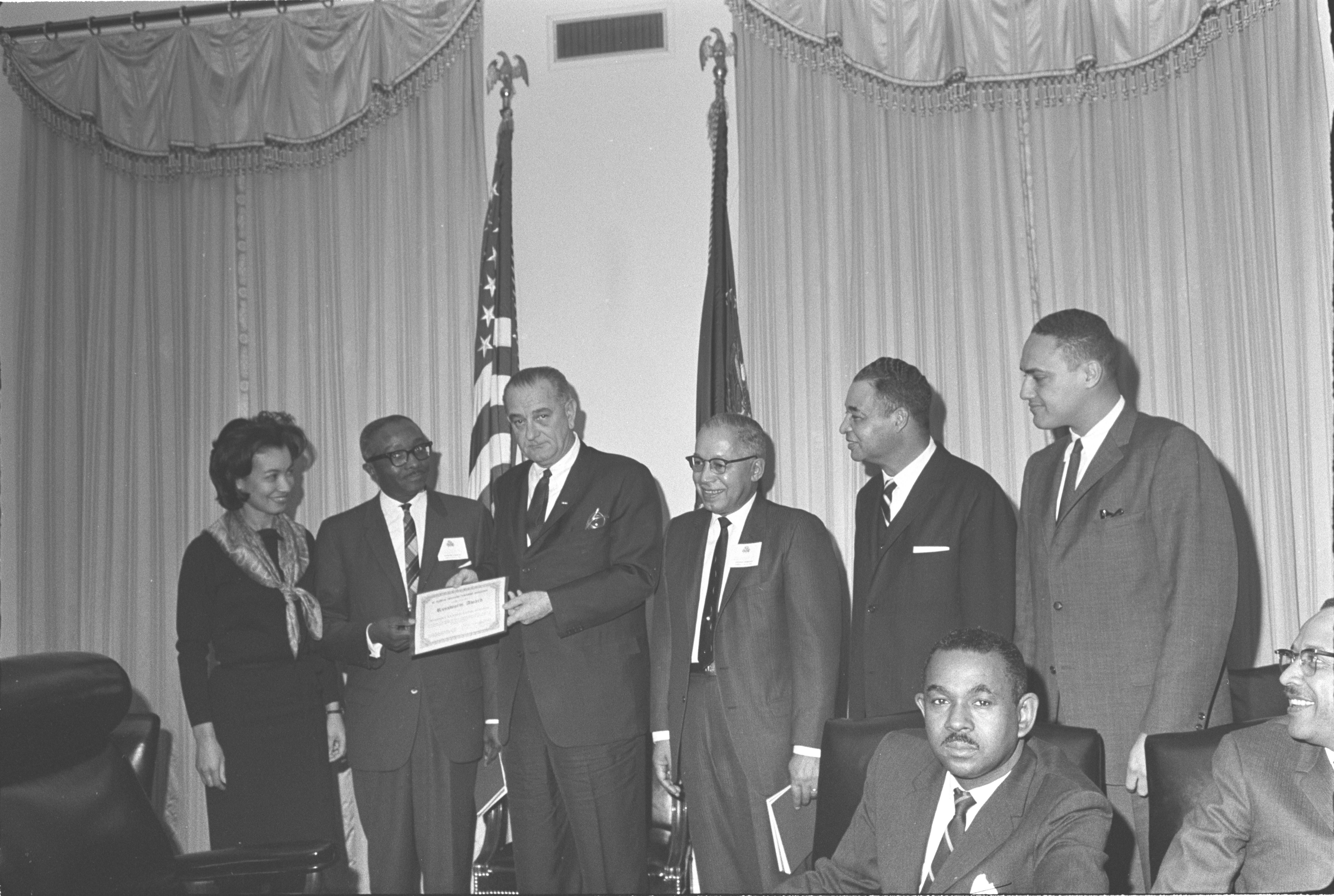
Lyndon Johnson meets with newspaper publishers in 1965.

There were many specialized black publications, such as those of Marcus Garvey and John H. Johnson. These men broke a wall that let black people into society. The Roanoke Tribune was founded in 1939 by Fleming Alexander, and recently celebrated its 75th anniversary. The Minnesota Spokesman-Recorder is Minnesota's oldest black-owned newspaper and one of the United States' oldest ongoing minority publication, second only to The Jewish World.

=== 21st century ===
Many Black newspapers that began publishing in the 1960s, 1970s, and 1980s went out of business because they could not attract enough advertising. As of 2002, about 200 Black newspapers remained. With the decline of print media and proliferation of internet access, more black news websites emerged, most notably Black Voice News, The Grio, The Root, and Black Voices.

== See also ==
- Black-owned business
- List of African American newspapers and media outlets
- List of newspapers in the United States
