= Pacific Appeal =

African-American newspaper

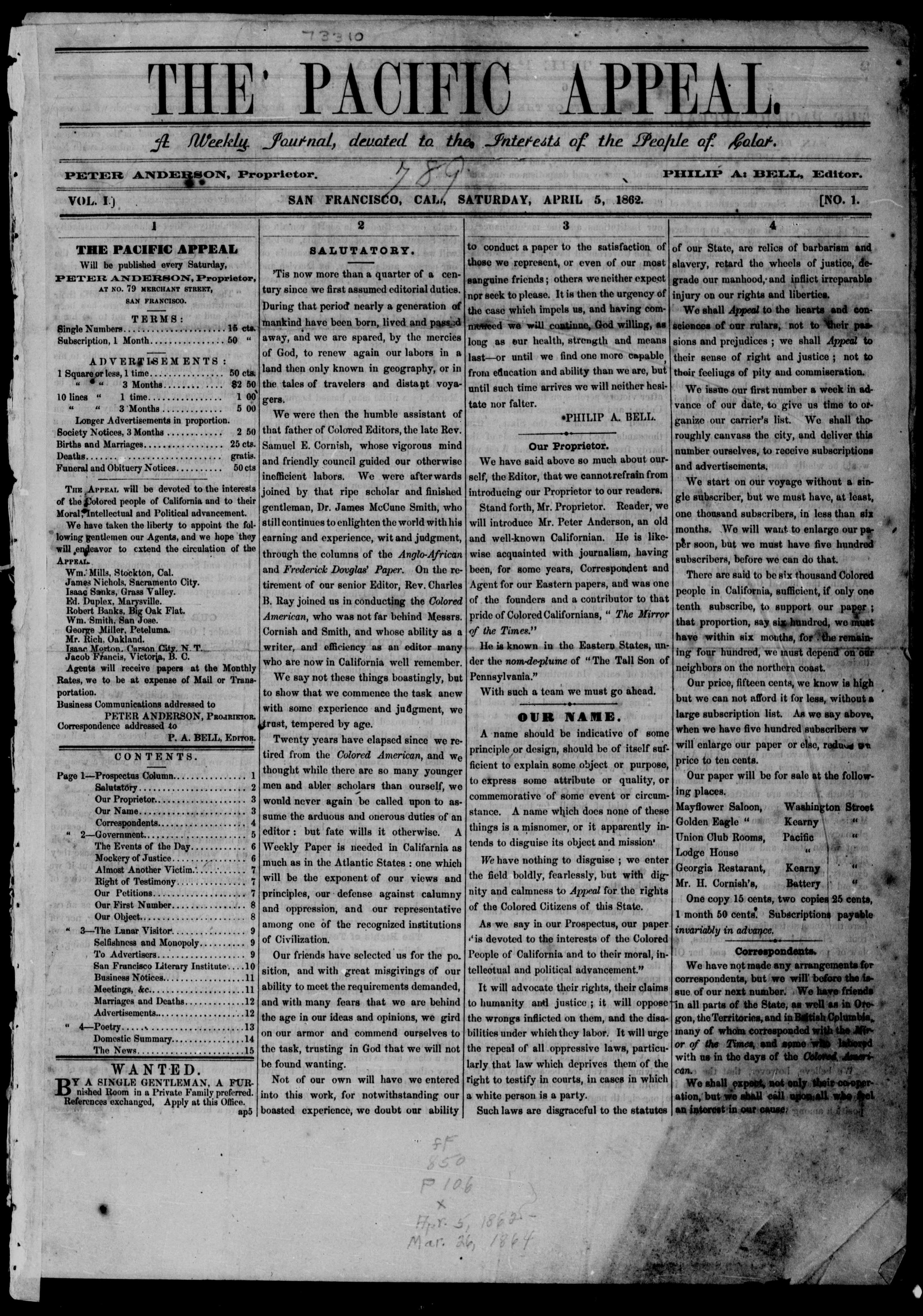
Front page of the first issue of the Pacific Appeal, published April 5, 1862

The Pacific Appeal was an African-American newspaper based in San Francisco published from April 1862 to June 1880. It included abolitionist content and covered civil rights issues.

== History ==
Pacific Appeal was co-founded by Philip Alexander Bell, an African-American civil rights and antislavery activist who had established Weekly Advocate (edited by Samuel Cornish) and worked for William Lloyd Garrison's Liberator, and Peter Anderson, a San Francisco civil rights activist and delegate at the California Colored Citizens Convention. It was the successor to the Mirror of the Times, another San Francisco-based African-American newspaper that had been established in 1855, with the change of name occurring along with a change of proprietor from Judge Mifflin W. Gibbs to William H. Carter. Its contemporaries at the time included The Anglo-African newspaper in New York City. The Appeal was regarded as the official organ of African-Americans on the Pacific slope.

The paper’s motto was “He who would be free, himself must strike the blow.” It began publishing in April 1862.

Later, Bell and Anderson would split, with Bell accusing Anderson of becoming less antislavery and more accommodationist.

== External coverage ==
The coverage of antislavery and civil rights issues in the first few years has been covered by historians and chroniclers of black abolitionism of the era, including in The Afro-American Press and Its Editors by Irvine Garland Penn published in 1891.

== Notable content ==
The inaugural 1862 volume contained eight antislavery poems, including four poems by San Francisco poet James Madison Bell, writing under the initials JMB.

Pacific Appeal also published some 250 proclamations by Emperor Norton, Emperor of the United States, including his proposals for what would later become the San Francisco–Oakland Bay Bridge and the Transbay Tube.

== See also ==
- List of African-American newspapers in California
