= List of newspapers in Canada =

This list of newspapers in Canada is a list of newspapers printed and distributed in Canada.

== Daily newspapers ==
| Newspaper | Prov. | City/region | Owner | Circulation (weekly total, 2013) | Frequency | Language | Notes |
|---|---|---|---|---|---|---|---|
| National Post | Nat'l | National | Postmedia | 982,555 | Tue–Sat | English | |
| The Globe and Mail | Nat'l | National | The Woodbridge Company | 2,139,363 | Mon–Sat | English | |
| Calgary Herald | AB | Calgary | Postmedia | 708,371 | Mon–Sat | English | |
| Calgary Sun | AB | Calgary | Postmedia | 431,881 | Mon–Sun | English | |
| Edmonton Journal | AB | Edmonton | Postmedia | 583,328 | Mon–Sat | English | |
| Edmonton Sun | AB | Edmonton | Postmedia | 303,324 | Mon–Sun | English | |
| Lethbridge Herald | AB | Lethbridge | Alta Newspaper Group | 117,279 | Mon–Sun | English | |
| Medicine Hat News | AB | Medicine Hat | Alta Newspaper Group | 64,731 | Tue–Sat | English | |
| Red Deer Advocate | AB | Red Deer | Black Press | 72,492 | Mon–Sat | English | |
| The Daily Courier | BC | Kelowna | Continental Newspapers | 80,872 | Tue–Sun | English | |
| Penticton Herald | BC | Penticton | Continental Newspapers | 42,240 | Mon–Sun | English | |
| The Province | BC | Vancouver | Postmedia | 840,185 | Tue–Sat | English | |
| The Vancouver Sun | BC | Vancouver | Postmedia | 970,710 | Tue–Sat | English | |
| Times Colonist | BC | Victoria | Glacier Media | 314,761 | Tue–Sun | English | |
| Brandon Sun | MB | Brandon | FP Canadian Newspapers LP | 72,113 | Mon–Sun | English | |
| Winnipeg Free Press | MB | Winnipeg | FP Canadian Newspapers LP | 687,191 | Mon–Sat | English | |
| Winnipeg Sun | MB | Winnipeg | The Klein Group | 391,156 | Mon–Sun | English | |
| L'Acadie Nouvelle | NB | Caraquet | Independent | 108,612 | Tue–Sat | French | |
| The Chronicle Herald | NS | Halifax | Postmedia | 577,382 | Mon–Sun | English | |
| Cape Breton Post | NS | Sydney | Postmedia | 119,581 | Tue–Sat | English | |
| The Intelligencer | ON | Belleville | Postmedia | 47,890 | Mon–Sat | English | |
| Brantford Expositor | ON | Brantford | Postmedia | 125,140 | Tue–Sat | English | |
| The Recorder and Times | ON | Brockville | Postmedia | 48,075 | Tue–Sat | English | |
| Chatham Daily News | ON | Chatham-Kent | Postmedia | 37,680 | Tue, Thu–Sat | English | |
| Cornwall Standard Freeholder | ON | Cornwall | Postmedia | 77,400 | Tue–Sat | English | |
| The Hamilton Spectator | ON | Hamilton | Torstar | 611,514 | Mon–Sat | English | |
| The Kingston Whig-Standard | ON | Kingston | Postmedia | 114,196 | Tue, Thu–Sat | English | |
| Waterloo Region Record | ON | Kitchener, Cambridge, Waterloo | Torstar | 362,825 | Mon–Sat | English | |
| The London Free Press | ON | London | Postmedia | 468,978 | Mon–Sat | English | |
| Niagara Falls Review | ON | Niagara Falls | Torstar | 119,080 | Mon–Sat | English | |
| Ottawa Citizen | ON | Ottawa | Postmedia | 661,039 | Mon–Sat | English | |
| Ottawa Sun | ON | Ottawa | Postmedia | 289,076 | Mon–Sun | English | |
| Owen Sound Sun Times | ON | Owen Sound | Postmedia | 192,425 | Tue–Sat | English | |
| The Peterborough Examiner | ON | Peterborough | Torstar | 103,957 | Mon–Sat | English | |
| The Observer | ON | Sarnia | Postmedia | 64,706 | Tue–Sat | English | |
| Simcoe Reformer | ON | Simcoe | Postmedia | 65,598 | Mon–Sat | English | |
| St. Catharines Standard | ON | St. Catharines | Torstar | 194,652 | Mon–Sat | English | |
| St. Thomas Times-Journal | ON | St. Thomas | Postmedia | 23,330 | Tue–Sat | English | |
| The Beacon Herald | ON | Stratford | Postmedia | 40,080 | Mon–Sat | English | |
| The Chronicle-Journal | ON | Thunder Bay | Continental Newspapers | 55,118 | Mon–Sun | English | |
| Toronto Sun | ON | Toronto | Postmedia | 1,076,623 | Mon–Sun | English | |
| Toronto Star | ON | Toronto | Torstar | 2,523,608 | Mon–Sun | English | |
| Welland Tribune | ON | Welland | Torstar | 90,386 | Mon–Sat | English | |
| Windsor Star | ON | Windsor | Postmedia | 314,794 | Mon–Sat | English | |
| Woodstock Sentinel-Review | ON | Woodstock | Postmedia | 46,200 | Mon–Fri | English | |
| The Guardian | PE | Charlottetown | Postmedia | 97,062 | Tue–Sat | English | |
| Le Devoir | QC | Montreal | Independent | 211,252 | Mon–Sat | French | |
| Le Journal de Montréal | QC | Montreal | Quebecor Media | 1,953,681 | Mon–Sun | French | |
| Montreal Gazette | QC | Montreal | Postmedia | 624,807 | Mon–Sat | English | |
| Le Journal de Québec | QC | Quebec City | Quebecor Media | 1,108,394 | Mon–Sun | French | |
| The Record | QC | Sherbrooke | Alta Newspaper Group | 21,565 | Mon–Fri | English | |
| Prince Albert Daily Herald | SK | Prince Albert | FolioJumpline Publishing Inc. | 31,425 | Tue–Sat | English | |
| Leader-Post | SK | Regina | Postmedia | 236,276 | Mon–Sat | English | |
| The StarPhoenix | SK | Saskatoon | Postmedia | 269,442 | Mon–Sat | English | |

== Local weeklies ==
=== Alberta ===
- Banff – Bow Valley Crag and Canyon
- Canmore – Rocky Mountain Outlook
- Drumheller – Drumheller Mail
- Fort Macleod – Fort Macleod Gazette
- Fort Saskatchewan – Fort Saskatchewan Record
- Lethbridge – Lethbridge Sun Times
- Lloydminster – Lloydminster Meridian Booster

=== British Columbia ===
- Abbotsford – Abbotsford News
- Aldergrove – Aldergrove Star
- Ashcroft/Cache Creek – Ashcroft-Cache Creek Journal
- Barriere – North Thompson Star/Journal
- Bowen Island – Undercurrent
- Burns Lake – Lake District News
- Campbell River – Campbell River Mirror
- Chilliwack – Chilliwack Progress
- Cranbrook – Cranbrook Townsman
- Grand Forks – Grand Forks Gazette
- Kimberley – Kimberley Bulletin
- Maple Ridge/Pitt Meadows – Maple Ridge-Pitt Meadows News
- Osoyoos – Osoyoos Times
- Prince George – The Prince George Citizen
- Surrey – Surrey Now-Leader
- Trail – Trail Times
- Vancouver – The Georgia Straight
- Vernon – The Morning Star

=== Manitoba ===
- Flin Flon – The Reminder
- Minnedosa – The Minnedosa Tribune
- Neepawa – Neepawa Banner
- St. Boniface – La Liberté
- Steinbach – Carillon News

=== New Brunswick ===
- Fredericton – The Daily Gleaner (3x weekly)
- Moncton – Times & Transcript (3x weekly)
- Saint John – Telegraph-Journal (3x weekly)
- St. Stephen – Saint Croix Courier
- Shediac – Le Moniteur Acadien
- Sussex – Kings County Record
- Woodstock – The Bugle-Observer

=== Newfoundland and Labrador ===
- St. John's – The Telegram, Le Gaboteur

=== Northwest Territories ===
- Yellowknife – Yellowknifer

=== Nova Scotia ===
- Windsor – The Hants Journal

=== Nunavut ===
- Iqaluit – Nunavut News/North, Nunatsiaq News
- Rankin Inlet – Kivalliq News

=== Ontario ===
- Bancroft – Bancroft This Week, The Bancroft Times
- Chatham – Chatham This Week, Today's Farmer
- Clarington – The Orono Weekly Times
- Dresden – Leader-Spirit
- Dundalk – Flesherton Advance
- Exeter – Exeter Lakeshore Times-Advocate
- Fort Frances – Fort Frances Times
- Grey Highlands – The Flesherton Advance
- Haliburton – Haliburton Echo
- Kenora – Kenora Miner and News
- Kincardine – Kincardine News
- Manitoulin – Expositor
- Minden – Minden Times
- North Huron – North Huron Citizen
- Oshweken – Turtle Island News
- Sault Ste. Marie – Sault This Week
- Sudbury – Le Voyageur
- Temiskaming Shores – The Temiskaming Speaker
- Toronto – L'Express (Toronto)
- Trenton – Trenton Trentonian
- Woodstock – Woodstock Sentinel-Review

=== Prince Edward Island ===
- Charlottetown – The Guardian
- Summerside – Journal Pioneer

=== Quebec ===
- Kahnawake – The Eastern Door
- Longueuil – Le Courrier Du Sud
- Montreal – The Suburban, Les Affaires
- Quebec City – Quebec Chronicle-Telegraph

=== Saskatchewan ===
- Davidson – Davidson Leader
- Lloydminster – Lloydminster Meridian Booster
- Swift Current – The Prairie Post
- Whitewood – Whitewood Herald

== Alternative weeklies ==
=== British Columbia ===
- Vancouver – Georgia Straight
- Victoria – Monday Magazine

=== Manitoba ===
- Winnipeg – Uptown

=== Newfoundland and Labrador ===
- St. John's – The Scope

=== Nova Scotia ===
- Halifax – The Coast
- Annapolis Valley – The Grapevine

=== Ontario ===
- Hamilton – View Magazine

=== Quebec ===
- Montreal – Voir

== Ethnic and multicultural newspapers ==
- Horizon Weekly
- Asian Pacific Post
- Maandblad de Krant
- Shahrvand
- Kanadan Sanomat
- Lögberg-Heimskringla
- Corriere Canadese
- The Jewish Post & News
- O Mundial – Winnipeg (in Portuguese)

== Monthly newspapers ==
- L'Action nationale
- L'aut'journal
- Cult MTL
- The Hudson Bay Post – Churchill, Manitoba
- People's Voice
- Le Québécois

== See also ==
- History of Canadian newspapers
- List of editors-in-chief of the largest newspapers in Canada
- List of Indigenous periodicals in Canada
- List of student newspapers in Canada
- List of defunct newspapers of Canada
- Media in Toronto
