= List of Memorial University of Newfoundland people =

This is a list of people involved with Memorial University of Newfoundland.

== Chancellors ==
Name	Years in office
Esmond Cecil Harmsworth, 2nd Viscount Rothermere	1952–1961
The Rt. Hon. Lord Thomson of Fleet	1961–1968
George Alain Frecker	1971–1979
Paul G. Desmarais	1979–1988
John C. Crosbie	1994–2008
Rick Hillier	2008–2012
Susan Dyer Knight	2012–2022
Earl Ludlow	2022–present

== Presidents ==
Name	Years active
John Lewis Paton	1925–1933
Albert Hatcher	1933–1952
Raymond Gushue	1952–1966
Moses Morgan	1966–1967
The Rt. Hon. the Lord Taylor of Harlow	1967–1973
Moses Morgan	1973–1981
Leslie Harris	1981–1990
Arthur May	1990–1999
Axel Meisen	1999–2007
Eddy Campbell	2007–2009
Christopher Loomis	2009–2010
Gary Kachanoski	2010–2020
Vianne Timmons	2020-2023
Neil Bose (pro tempore)	2023 to 2025
Janet Morrison	2025 to present

== Founders ==
- Vincent Patrick Burke

== Notable alumni ==
=== Academics and scholars ===
- David Agnew, president, Seneca College of Applied Arts and Technology, former Secretary of Cabinet, Government of Ontario
- Gary Botting, poet, playwright, lawyer and legal scholar
- Donald B. Dingwell, D.Sc. (h.c. mult.), award-winning experimental geoscientist
- Robert Gellately, historian
- John Gosse, geomorphologist
- George Ivany, President, University of Saskatchewan
- Mary C. Lobban, British physiologist
- Brian Pratt, award-winning paleontologist and sedimentologist and past president of the Geological Association of Canada
- Carolyn Relf, geologist
- Harold Williams, geologist and world expert on the tectonics of mountain belts

=== Business ===
- Moya Greene, President and CEO of Royal Mail

=== Politics and government ===
- KM Chan, biochemistry professor and politician
- Gen. Rick Hillier, Chief of the Defence Staff, Canadian Forces
- Dale Kirby, former Minister of Education and Early Childhood Development
- Allan Rowe, MPP for Dartmouth South and liberal caucus whip, former television host
- Marit Stiles (born 1969), Member of Provincial Parliament for Davenport in the Legislative Assembly of Ontario, leader of the Ontario New Democratic Party (NDP) and the leader of the Opposition
- Clyde Wells, Chief Justice of the Supreme Court of Newfoundland and Labrador, former Premier of Newfoundland and Labrador
- Tony Wakeham, 16th premier of Newfoundland and Labrador

=== Film and television ===
- Perry Chafe, TV producer and writer, Republic of Doyle & Son of A Critch
- Bill Gillespie, former Security Correspondent, CBC Radio
- Tristan Homer, children's television producer
- Bhreagh MacNeil, Canadian Screen Award nominated actress
- Mark McKinney, comedian, member of The Kids in the Hall
- Scott Oake, sportscaster for CBC Sports

=== Press and literature ===
- Anne Chislett, playwright
- Michael Crummey, novelist and poet
- Gwynne Dyer, journalist, syndicated columnist and military historian, Senior Lecturer in War Studies at the Royal Military Academy Sandhurst
- Tom Harrington, journalist
- Wayne Johnston, novelist

=== Art and music ===
- Alan Doyle, musician
- Nancy Dahn, musician
- Bob Hallett, musician
- Andy Jones, comedian
- Séan McCann, musician
- Fergus O'Byrne, musician
- Shelley Posen, folklorist and singer-songwriter

=== Sports ===
- Brad Gushue, Olympic gold medalist in curling
- Jeff Nippard, YouTuber and bodybuilder
- Mark Nichols, Olympic gold medalist in curling

=== Medicine ===
- Norman R.C. Campbell, Professor of Medicine, Community Health Sciences and Physiology and Pharmacology at the University of Calgary
- Ranjit Chandra, Former professor of Medicine, forced to resign after allegations of scientific misconduct and data fabrication
- Jawahar Kalra, physician, clinical researcher, and academic

=== Religion ===
- Darrell Critch, Anglican bishop of Mahajanga
- Alexander Pryor, Anglican bishop of the Arctic

=== Rhodes Scholars ===
- Robert Joy (1973), actor
- Danny Williams (1969), Premier of Newfoundland and Labrador
- Rex Murphy (1968), TV commentator
- Bill Rowe (1964), former politician, lawyer, broadcaster, and writer
- Fabian O'Dea (1939), Newfoundland and Canadian lawyer and the fourth lieutenant governor of Newfoundland
- Moses Morgan (1938), Canadian academic and president of Memorial University of Newfoundland from 1973 to 1981

== Notable faculty ==
- Jean Briggs, anthropologist and expert on Inuit languages
- Lindsay Cahill, chemist
- John Frederick Dewey, structural geologist; Wollaston Medal & Penrose Medal recipient.
- Donald Hillman, paediatrician and professor of pediatrics best known for working in Third World countries in international child health and development
- Ian Jordaan, University Research Professor, engineer and expert on design of offshore structures in harsh environments
- Francesca M. Kerton, chemist
- Elliott Leyton, renowned for studies of serial murderers
- Elizabeth Miller, 19th century British Gothic literature
- Ward Neale, geologist
- Robert Paine, Anthropologist studying the Inuit and Saami peoples.
- Patrick Parfrey, nephrologist and clinical epidemiologist
- Augustus Rowe, former Minister of Health of Newfoundland and Labrador; former chairman of Memorial University's Department of Family Medicine
- Wei Qiu, architecture professor
- Harold Williams, University Research Professor, geologist and world expert on the tectonics of mountain belts

== Honorary degree recipients ==
- Sarah Anala, Canadian social worker
- Anne, Princess Royal, member of the Canadian Royal family
- Lloyd Axworthy, Canadian politician
- Jean Chrétien, 20th Prime Minister of Canada
- Bob Cole, CBC hockey commentator
- John Frederick Dewey, geologist
- Craig Dobbin, businessman
- Gwynne Dyer, journalist
- John Kenneth Galbraith, economist
- Loyola Hearn, former Minister of Fisheries and Oceans
- Ron Hynes, folk musician
- David Lloyd Johnston, Governor General of Canada
- Cathy Jones, comedian and actress
- Aung San Suu Kyi, pro-democracy advocate
- HRH Princess Mary, member of the Canadian Royal Family
- Rick Mercer, Canadian comedian and television personality
- Brian Mulroney, 18th Prime Minister of Canada
- Ward Neale, geologist
- Lester B. Pearson, 14th Prime Minister of Canada, Nobel Peace Prize winner
- Edward Shackleton, geographer and politician
- David Suzuki, Canadian science broadcaster and environmental activist
- Mary Walsh, comedian
- John Tuzo Wilson, geophysicist
