= The Lindsay Post =

- Type: Twice-weekly newspaper
- Format: Broadsheet
- Owner: Sun Media
- Publisher: Darren Murphy
- Managing editor: Jason Bain
- Founded: 1861
- Ceased publication: 2013
- Headquarters: 17 William St. S, Lindsay, Ontario
- Country: Canada

The Lindsay Post was a newspaper in Lindsay, Ontario, Canada, that was established as The Canadian Post in 1857 in Beaverton before being moved to Lindsay in 1861. Before it ceased publishing in 2013, it was a twice-weekly, broadsheet community newspaper that was part of Sun Media and Quebecor, Canada's largest newspaper publisher.

At the time of its closing, The Lindsay Post had a subscription-based paper on Tuesdays and a Friday edition that was delivered to homes free across the City of Kawartha Lakes. The publisher was Darren Murphy. Gerry Drage was the advertising manager and Jason Bain was the managing editor.

The paper changed its name from The Daily Post to The Lindsay Post in May 2007, to reflect its change from publishing Monday to Friday to Tuesdays and Fridays. In July 2008, it began publishing on Thursdays instead of Fridays. In April 2009, it switched back to Fridays when its printing moved from Peterborough to a new state-of-the-art press in Toronto that gives the paper full colour.

For 100 years, the newspaper operated at 15 William Street South, a historic building where the Freemasons once leased the third floor. In May 2007, the paper moved a short distance away to 17 William Street South.

Sister papers in the Sun Media chain in the region included The Peterborough Examiner, Orillia Packet & Times, Minden Times and Haliburton Echo.

== History ==
The Canadian Post, a liberal weekly, was started in Beaverton in 1857 by C. Blackett Robinson and moved to Lindsay in 1861.

According to the 1857 Canada Directory of Newspapers, Lindsay had the Lindsay Advocate and the Lindsay Herald when The Canadian Post joined them in 1863. In 1866, The Omemee Warder was moved to Lindsay to become the Victoria Warder. Peter Murray and W.M. Hale began the Lindsay Expositor in 1869. The Herald and Expositor died in infancy.

The Lindsay Advocate sold its equipment to The Post and Warder in 1876. In 1870, C.B. Robinson moved to Toronto and founded the Canadian Presbyterian. The Post was left to be run by his brother-in-law George T. Gurnett until 1873, when it was taken over by Charles D. Barr, night editor of the Toronto Globe.

Cooper sold The Warder to John Dobson, and Edward Flood became editor. Sam Hughes, a Toronto high school teacher, became editor of The Warder in 1885. In time, Cooper sold out the Watchman to George Lytle, who in 1899 bought up The Warder and amalgamated them as the Watchman Warder.

Lytle was succeeded as editor by Allan Gillies who, with the help of Ford Moynes of Stratford, launched The Daily Warder in 1903. John W. Deyell then became the proprietor.

The Post was taken over by George H. Wilson and F. W. Wilson of Port Hope in 1893. On April 8, 1895, the weekly edition was supplemented by a daily edition.

In later years, F.W. Wilson continued as the sole publisher of the Port Hope Evening Guide and G.H. Wilson as the sole publisher of The Post.

Two new rival papers founded in 1895 were short-lived. Sam Porter of The Post staff published a Lindsay News Item for a few weeks in 1895, and a Free Press was started on May 8, 1908, but it ceased publication on February 20, 1909.

During and after the First World War, newspaper costs became so crushing that The Post and the Watchman Warder entered into an agreement by which, after September 30, 1920, the former abolished their weekly and the latter abolished their daily edition.

The Post continued to publish as a daily for one hundred years until May 2007.

On June 13, 2013, publisher Darren Murphy announced at the Post offices,

It is with regret that we close The Lindsay Post, effective June 14.... I have been involved with The Lindsay Post in different roles for almost 10 years, and we have made numerous attempts to change the business model to try and make this operation sustainable. Unfortunately, the market has not been able to support the continued publication of the newspaper.

Murphy noted the changing media landscape and market conditions as contributing factors in the closure of the newspaper. Six employees' jobs were lost because of the closure.

== Notable writers ==
- Bill Fitsell (1923–2020), Canadian sports journalist and historian

== See also ==
- List of newspapers in Canada
