= Cape Breton Post =

Canadian daily newspaper in Nova Scotia

- Front page of the June 5, 2020 edition
- Type: Daily newspaper
- Format: Broadsheet
- Owner: Postmedia Network
- Editor: Carl Fleming
- Founded: 1901; 125 years ago
- Language: English
- Circulation: 22,245 weekdays 21,869 Saturdays (as of 2010)
- ISSN: 0839-4970
- Website: www.capebretonpost.com

The Cape Breton Post is the only daily newspaper published on Cape Breton Island. Founded in Sydney, Nova Scotia, in 1901, it specializes in local coverage of news, events, and sports from communities in the Cape Breton Regional Municipality and the counties of Inverness, Richmond and Victoria.

== History ==
=== Predecessors and establishment ===
The Cape Breton Post evolved from the earlier independent Sydney Post-Record (1933-1956), owned by John Stewart McLennan, which resulted from a merger of the morning and evening editions of the Liberal paper the Sydney Record (originated as a weekly in 1884) and the Conservative Sydney Daily Post (originated as a weekly in 1896; became a daily paper on March 8, 1901, purchased by Mclennan in 1904). With the amalgamation of these two papers in January 1933 the Post-Record became a politically independent daily, with a circulation increasing from approximately 7,200 to 27,000 by 1951. The Post-Record primarily covered Cape Breton County, with some coverage of the rest of Cape Breton Island and the eastern Nova Scotia mainland. The Post-Record's name was changed to its current name, The Cape Breton Post, in July 1956 to better reflect the broader scope of its coverage. The very first issue of the Cape Breton Post was published on July 14, 1956.

=== Sale to Hollinger ===
The Cape Breton Post was acquired by Thomson Newspapers in early December 1971 from the Duchemin family. Kenneth Thomson allowed Roy Duchemin to continue on as publisher and general manager, with no changes to the paper and its staff other than new ownership. On 30 April 1996, Thompson announced it entered an agreement to sell its group of Atlantic Canada papers, including the Post, to Vancouver-based Hollinger Inc., which, at the time, also had a minority stake in the Southam Inc. chain. By the time the sale closed, Hollinger was a majority owner of Southam, and used them to buy seven Ontario daily newspapers from Thomson in September 1996, with the Atlantic newspaper sale still pending and possibly moving to Southam from Hollinger. The deal was finalized on 25 October 1996, with Hollinger handing over the Atlantic papers to its Southam chain.

=== Transcontinental Media purchase ===
Canwest, after acquiring Southam in November 2000, which included the Cape Breton Post, examined ways to integrate many of its smaller market papers into its Global television news division; however, it wasn't to be. On August 10, 2002, Canwest sold eight Atlantic Canada and two Saskatchewan daily newspapers, 34 community papers, and two printing plants to Transcontinental Media including the Cape Breton Post, and St. John's The Telegram. The deal allowed Transcontinental to use its newly acquired Summerside, Prince Edward Island plant to print the Atlantic Canada version of the National Post.

== Circulation ==
According to figures via Canadian Newspaper Association, the Cape Breton Post's average weekday circulation for 2015 was 16,972, while on Saturdays it was 16,319. Because of the relatively small population of Cape Breton Island, that meant that over 12% of the population could be receiving the paper and its advertisements. Like most Canadian daily newspapers, the Cape Breton Post has seen a decline in circulation, dropping its total by 25% to 106,473 copies daily from 2008 to 2015.

Daily average

== Saltwire acquisition ==
On April 13, 2017, Transcontinental announced that it had sold all of its newspapers in Atlantic Canada to SaltWire Network, a newly formed parent company of The Chronicle Herald.

On 29 November 2018 Saltwire Network announced the closure of its press in Sydney, with the printing of the Cape Breton Post moved to the company's press in Halifax.

In March 2019, all SaltWire publication websites, including the Cape Breton Post, introduced metered paywalls. At the end of March 2019, the Post's owners, Saltwire, terminated its affiliation with the Canadian Press newswire service, opting instead to become a client of Postmedia and Reuters. In March 2019, SaltWire announced it was putting 10 of its newspaper buildings up for sale, including the headquarters for the Cape Breton Post.

== Cease print edition of Cape Breton Post on Mondays ==
On 3 October 2022, SaltWire Network announced they would cease publishing a print version of the Cape Breton Post on Mondays. Along with the Post, three other Satwire publications were impacted: The Chronicle Herald, in Halifax; The Guardian, in Charlottetown, P.E.I.; and,The Telegram, in St. John's. Digital editions replaced the printed versions on Mondays. The announcement took effect on 17 October, but as in the past, there was no print publication on Thanksgiving Monday.

== Postmedia's takeover ==
In March 2024, Saltwire declared bankruptcy. Postmedia Network bought the remains of Saltwire in late summer 2024, including the Cape Breton Post. About a month after Postmedia's takeover, major layoffs occurred in management, editorial staff, and writers, including cartoonist Michael de Adder which also resulted in local content being replaced by advertisements.

The Post's most recent headquarters in Sydney was put up for sale in October 2024 as the paper is no longer printed in Sydney, but at the same printing press as the Halifax Chronicle Herald on the mainland. This building, built for the Post in 1985, is located at the corner of Dorchester and George Streets, and is just a short distance from the former brick and concrete Sydney Post-Record building at 75 Dorchester Street, which still stands.

== Notable staff ==
- H.P. Duchemin, who started the predecessor publication as the Sydney Daily Post in 1899/1901
- Roy Duchemin, son of H.P. Duchemin, who took over as publisher in the early 1940s.
- Night editor Bob Duchemin (1965 – 2010, son of Roy, grandson of H.P.)
- Associate editor, Doug McGee (1984 – 2010)

== See also ==
- List of newspapers in Canada
