= Bancroft This Week =

Canadian newspaper

- Type: Weekly newspaper
- Format: Tabloid
- Owner: White Pine Media
- Editor: Nate Smelle
- Founded: 2000
- Language: English
- Headquarters: 254 Hastings Street N. BANCROFT ON
- Sister newspapers: The Bancroft Times, Minden Times, Haliburton Echo
- ISSN: 1491-5278
- Website: www.bancroftthisweek.com

Bancroft This Week is a weekly tabloid newspaper reporting on news in the Bancroft, Ontario area, published by White Pine Media.

It first appeared in 2000 as Bancroft This Weekend.

== Production ==
In its current incarnation, in tabloid-format, it circulates to more than 10,000 homes, as a flyer wrap, in a wide geographic range that spans across much of North Hastings (Hastings County) and its outskirts including Hastings Highlands (Maynooth), Madawaska Valley (Barry's Bay), Bancroft, Wollaston (Coe Hill) and Highlands East (Cardiff & Wilberforce). The publication is delivered every Friday.

== The Bancroft Times ==
In 2018 White Pine Media purchased The Bancroft Times, which has been a family owned independent newspaper since 1894.

== See also ==
- List of newspapers in Canada
