= List of Indigenous periodicals in Canada =

This is a list of periodicals either edited by or intended for Indigenous peoples in Canada.

- Aboriginal Voices, Toronto, Ontario, 1994-, bimonthly, continues The Runner
- Alberta Sweetgrass, Edmonton: Aboriginal Multi-Media Society (AMMSA), 1993-, monthly, serves Aboriginal communities throughout Alberta
- Anishinabek News, North Bay, Ontario: Union of Ontario Indians, 1990-, monthly (continues Anishinabek)
- The Drum, Scanterbury, Manitoba: Taiga Communications, 1998-, monthly
- The Eastern Door, Kahnawake, Quebec: K. Deer, 1992-, weekly
- First Perspective, Scanterbury, Manitoba: Blue Sky Graphics, 1992-, irregular
- Ha-Shilth-Sa, Canada's oldest First Nations newspaper, Nuu-chah-nulth, 1974-
- Healing Words / Le premier pas, Ottawa, Ontario: The Foundation, 1988-, quarterly
- Kahtou: the voice of B.C. First Nations, Sechelt, British Columbia: K'watamus Publications, 1993-, twice monthly, continues Kahtou News
- MAZINA’IGAN, A Chronicle of the Lake Superior Ojibwe, Great Lakes Indian Fish & Wildlife Federation, quarterly
- Métis Voyageur, Métis Nation of Ontario, irregular
- Micmac Maliseet Nation News, Truro, Nova Scotia: Confederacy of Mainland Micmacs, 1991-, monthly, continues Micmac Nation News
- The Nation, Montreal, Quebec: Beesum Communications, 1993-, fortnightly
- Nunatsiaq News, Iqaluit, Nunavut: Nortext, 1973-, weekly and online (English and Inuktitut)
- Raven's Eye, Edmonton, Alberta: Aboriginal Multi-Media Society (AMMSA), 1997-, monthly, serves Aboriginal communities throughout British Columbia and Yukon
- Saskatchewan Sage, Edmonton, Alberta: Aboriginal Multi-Media Society (AMMSA), 1996-, monthly, serves Aboriginal communities throughout Saskatchewan
- The Turtle Island News, Grand River Territory of the Six Nations, 1994-, weekly, national in scope
- The Two Row Times, Six Nations of the Grand River, Ohsweken, Ontario, English, Mohawk, Cayuga and Onondaga, serves First Nation communities province wide.
- Tusaayaksat, Inuvik, Northwest Territories: Inuvialuit Communications Society, 1983-, bimonthly, English and Inuvialuktun
- SAY Magazine, Winnipeg, Manitoba, 2002-, bi-monthly, 6 issues per year (English) serves Indigenous Peoples (First Nations, Métis, Inuit) across Canada
- Windspeaker, Edmonton, Alberta: Aboriginal Multi-Media Society (AMMSA), 1983-, monthly, serves Aboriginal communities throughout Canada

== See also ==
- List of newspapers in Canada
- History of Canadian newspapers
