= Continental Newspapers =

Canadian newspaper publisher

Continental Newspapers Canada Ltd.
- Company type: Private
- Industry: Newspapers
- Headquarters: Kelowna, British Columbia, Canada
- Area served: British Columbia and Ontario
- Key people: David Radler, founder
- Products: Three daily newspapers
- Parent: David Radler (72.4); Glacier Media (27.6%)
- Divisions: The Chronicle-Journal; The Okanagan Valley Group of Newspapers

Continental Newspapers, formally known as Continental Newspapers Canada Ltd., is a Canadian daily newspaper publisher based in Kelowna, British Columbia. It publishes two British Columbia dailies and The Chronicle-Journal of Thunder Bay, Ontario.

Continental is one of two Canadian newspaper companies run and partially owned by David Radler, a former business partner of Conrad Black who was convicted of defrauding their company, Hollinger Inc.

Both Continental and Alta Newspaper Group are descendants of Horizon Operations (Canada) Ltd., a company Radler founded at the end of the 1990s.

== History ==
The newspapers that currently make up Continental were purchased from The Thomson Corporation between 1999 and 2001 by Horizon, a family of companies owned by David Radler and Conrad Black, independently from Radler's and Black's roles as COO and CEO, respectively, of Hollinger Inc. During the 2000s, both men were convicted of defrauding Hollinger and served time in prison; Black sold his interest in Horizon in 2006.

Radler organized his Canadian holdings into two companies, grouping the Lethbridge Herald, Medicine Hat News and several Alberta and Saskatchewan weeklies into Alta, a limited partnership, while leaving the Okanagan Valley and Thunder Bay papers in Horizon Operations, which was later renamed Continental Newspapers Canada. Continental has not made any major acquisitions since then.

As a private company, Continental is not required to publish an annual report, but is said to be "owned mostly by David Radler". The company's predecessor, Horizon Operations, was acknowledged to have been owned and operated primarily by Radler.

In 2006, after taking a 50% (later 59%) ownership interest in Alta Newspaper Group, Vancouver-based publisher Glacier Media purchased a 25% share in Continental for $16.2 million. It later increased its ownership share to 27.6%, for an additional $1.1 million. Glacier is also part-owner of two other newspaper companies connected with Radler, Alta and RISN Operations. Sam Grippo, Glacier's chairman of the board, was a group publisher at Hollinger during Radler's time as COO.

== Properties ==
Continental Newspapers Canada Ltd. publishes three daily newspapers and one combined weekend newspaper:

- The Chronicle-Journal of Thunder Bay, Ontario
- The Daily Courier of Kelowna, British Columbia
- Penticton Herald of Penticton, British Columbia
- The Okanagan Saturday the weekend edition of the Kelowna and Penticton papers
