= The Western Star (Corner Brook) =

Canadian weekly newspaper

- Type: Weekly newspaper (formerly daily)
- Format: Broadsheet
- Owner: SaltWire Network
- Editor: Troy Turner (last editor of the daily newspaper)
- Founded: April 4, 1900; 126 years ago
- Ceased publication: April 10, 2019; 7 years ago (as a daily paper)
- Headquarters: 106 West Street, Corner Brook, Newfoundland and Labrador, Canada
- ISSN: 0839-3664
- Website: www.saltwire.com/newfoundland-labrador/

The Western Star is a weekly newspaper published Wednesdays in Corner Brook, Newfoundland and Labrador, Canada, and also serving Stephenville and the Bay of Islands, Bay St. George and Humber Valley areas.

== History ==
The paper was founded in 1900 in Curling, as a weekly newspaper. It became a daily paper in 1954 and was the only daily newspaper in western Newfoundland. It also had readers outside its main coverage area in Labrador. On April 13, 2017, Transcontinental announced that it had sold all of its newspapers in Atlantic Canada to SaltWire Network, a newly formed parent company of The Chronicle Herald.

SaltWire Network announced April 10, 2019 that The Western Star would change from a paid daily newspaper to a free weekly community paper. The last daily paper was delivered April 10, 2019, and the new weekly model was to begin April 17, 2019. The building in Corner Brook was already in the process of being sold. About 30 employees were laid off as printing operations moved from Corner Brook to St. John's, and about 20 contract delivery drivers and paper delivery workers also lost their jobs. Plans were announced for many remaining employees to become remote workers, similar to SaltWire's announced changes of 2018 at another Newfoundland newspaper, The Carbonear Compass.

== See also ==
- List of newspapers in Canada
