= News/North =

Canadian newspaper in Northwest Territories

Coordinates: 62°27′08″N 114°22′07″W

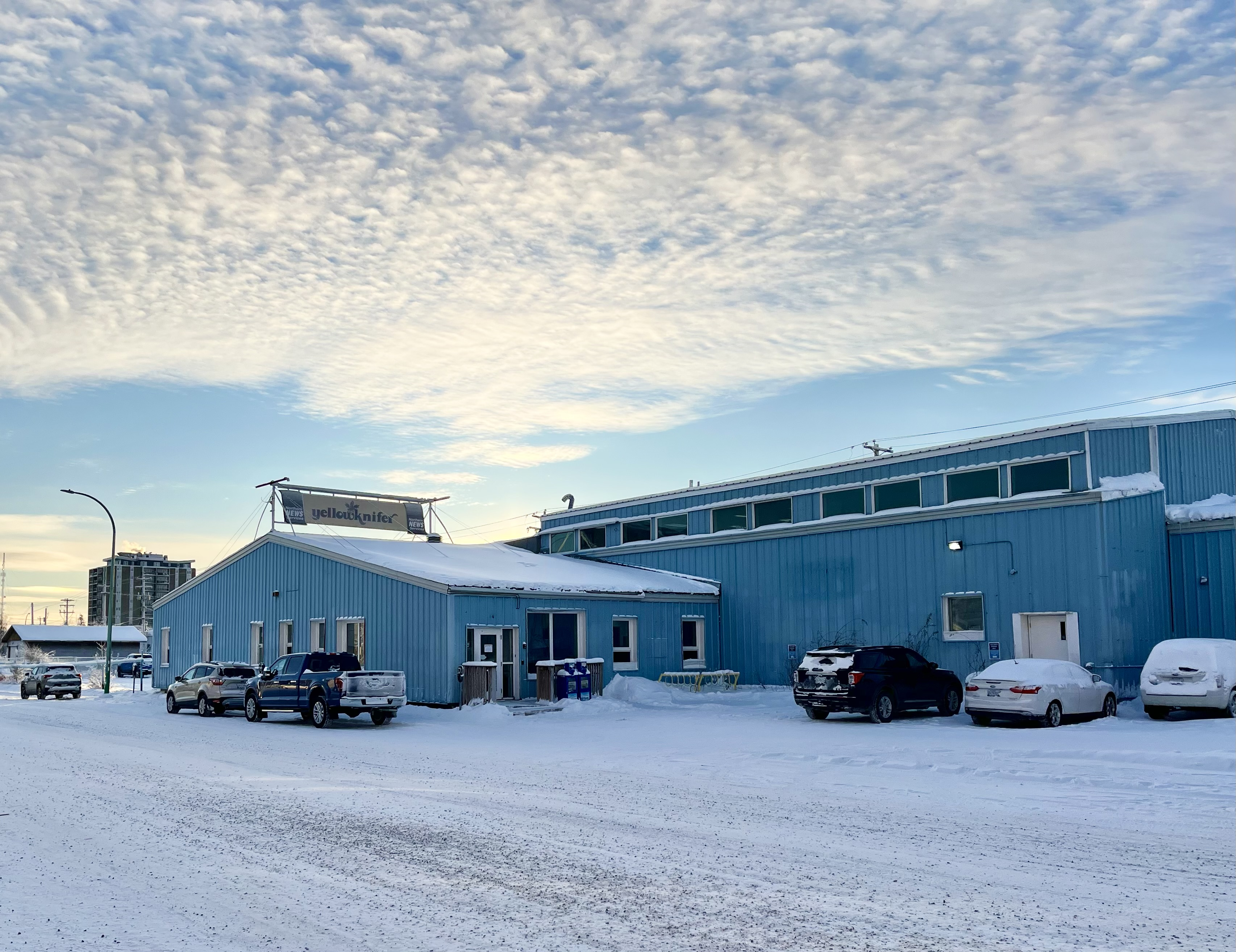
- Type: Weekly newspaper
- Format: Compact
- Owner: Northern News Services
- Publisher: J.W. (Sig) Sigvaldason
- Managing editor: Bruce Valpy
- Founded: March 22, 1972
- Headquarters: Yellowknife, Northwest Territories
- Circulation: 4,252 (as of October 2022)
- Sister newspapers: Kivalliq News, Yellowknifer
- Website: nnsl.com

News/North (originally the News of the North) is a Canadian weekly newspaper based in Yellowknife, Northwest Territories, with offices in Fort Smith, Hay River, Fort Providence and Norman Wells, Northwest Territories, as well as Iqaluit and Rankin Inlet, Nunavut, and owned by Northern News Services.

The newspaper is printed in two separate editions, Northwest Territories News/North and Nunavut News/North (ᓄᓇᕗᒥ ᐱᕙᓪᓕᐊᔪᑦ) that reports on news throughout the NWT and Nunavut. Although some features are identical in the two papers, the majority of the articles reflect the territory they are intended for. The Nunavut News/North features several articles translated into Inuktitut and printed in syllabics. A Monday edition is printed weekly, with a different front page substituted on the Northwest Territories News/North for distribution in Yellowknife.

== See also ==
- List of newspapers in Canada
