= NNSL =

NNSL may refer to:

- Northern News Services, a news company based in Yellowknife, Northwest Territories
- Nigerian National Shipping Line, a defunct national flag carrier
