= Nippard =

Nippard is an English surname. Notable people with this surname include:

- Derek Nippard (1938–2017), English football referee
- Jeff Nippard (born 1990), Canadian bodybuilder and fitness influencer
