= Lethbridge Sun Times =

Canadian newspaper, founded 1985

- Type: Weekly newspaper
- Owner(s): Alta Newspaper Group
- Founded: 1985, as Buy and Sell
- Headquarters: 504 7th Street South; Lethbridge, Alberta; T1J 2G8
- Circulation: 24,000 in 2007
- Website: lethsuntimes.com (defunct)

Lethbridge Sun Times is a weekly paper in the Lethbridge, Alberta, area, with a circulation of 24,000 in 2007. The paper is part of Alta Newspaper Group, the same company that publishes and distributes the daily Lethbridge Herald.

== History ==
In 1985, Vic Palychuk, Joe Myndio and Ted Stilson started a company called Demographics Inc. This company ran the monthly Buy and Sell newspaper, a publication focusing on classified advertising and available at a small number of locations. The paper was a direct competitor to The Shopper, another weekly classifieds paper. In short time, the Buy and Sell expanded into a 24-page weekly paper and delivered to every home in Lethbridge. By its third year, the paper had won an award from the Lethbridge Chamber of Commerce.

By the time the paper was sold to Thomson Newspapers in 1995, it was named the Southern Sun Times. In September 2000, Thomson sold the Sun Times – along with the Herald – to Horizon Publications Inc., now called Alta Newspaper Group.

In September 2007, Southern Sun Times changed its name to Lethbridge Sun Times.

== See also ==
- List of newspapers in Canada
