= The Telegram =

Canadian newspaper in Newfoundland

- Type: Weekly newspaper (formerly daily)
- Format: Broadsheet
- Owner: Postmedia Network
- Editor: Jennifer Vardy Little
- Founded: 1879, as The Evening Telegram
- Political alignment: Centre
- Headquarters: 36 Austin Street; St. John's, Newfoundland and Labrador; A1B 3T7
- Circulation: 24,311 weekdays 37,975 Saturdays (as of 2010)
- ISSN: 1487-6019
- Website: thetelegram.com

The Telegram is a weekly newspaper in St. John's, Newfoundland and Labrador, published by Postmedia Network. First published in 1879, it was the first and longest-running daily in Newfoundland.

In August 2024, following its sale to Postmedia, the paper ceased daily publication and began to only publish print editions on Fridays. Its website, however, continues to update daily.

== History ==
The Evening Telegram was first published on April 3, 1879, by William James Herder. It adopted its current name in 1998, although it was also briefly published under this name in 1881. Herder and his descendants owned and published The Evening Telegram until it was sold to Thomson Newspapers (later Thomson Corporation) in 1970, and continued as publishers until the departure of Stephen R. Herder (William's grandson) in 1991.

William Herder began as a printer for the St. John's weekly The Courier. When it folded in 1878, Herder purchased one of the presses and began his own newspaper. The Telegram was notable as the first daily (excluding Sundays) in Newfoundland. It is also the only 19th-century Newfoundland newspaper to survive into the 20th (and now 21st) century. Over the course of its history, the paper has published news, stories and editorials of interest to readers in the dominion, and later province, of Newfoundland, and St. John's in particular. Coverage of the St. John's Great Fire of 1892 was hampered as the Evening Telegram head office on Duckworth Street was completely destroyed in the fire. Despite heavy losses, Herder rebuilt and was published from a temporary location on Water Street less than two months later.

In May 1996, Thomson sold to the paper to Hollinger Inc. as one of several transactions between the companies in the mid-1990s. In 2000, the paper was included in the newspaper assets that Hollinger sold to Canwest. Less than two years later, Canwest sold its newspapers in Atlantic Canada to printing company Transcontinental.

On April 13, 2017, Transcontinental announced that it had sold all of its newspapers in Atlantic Canada to SaltWire Network, a newly formed parent company of The Chronicle Herald in Halifax.

In April 2021, it was announced by SaltWire that The Telegram's standalone website would merge into SaltWire.com effective April 20.

=== Sale to Postmedia, transition to weekly ===
In July 2024, after filing for creditor protection, SaltWire announced its sale of most of its assets to Postmedia Network. The sale, which closed August 24, included The Telegram but not its printing press, which would be decommissioned and closed. On August 21, 2024, The Telegram announced that it would cut print distribution to once per-week, with daily news coverage continuing online. Its final daily print edition was published on August 24, and weekly publication on Fridays began on August 30.

Following the completion of the Postmedia acquisition, it was confirmed that the weekly paper would be printed outside the province and mailed to subscribers. Other daily newspapers that were part of the transaction but are closer to the production facility, including The Guardian in Charlottetown, continued to publish at least five days a week following the sale. Physical distribution was paused entirely later that year during the 2024 Canada Post strike, though digital replicas were still produced for online distribution.

== Politics ==
In the 19th century, The Evening Telegram was known for its strong opinions on issues of the day, including the Newfoundland Railway, and early Confederation discussions. However, its editorial policy remained neutral during the heated Confederation debates of 1948/49. The same could not be said of former Evening Telegram reporter Joey Smallwood, who worked for the paper from 1919 to 1922 (including a short stint as editor in 1923). After his association with The Evening Telegram, Smallwood went on to found the pro-Confederation newspaper The Confederate, lead Newfoundland into confederation with Canada, and become the first premier of the new province of Newfoundland. As Premier, Smallwood had a rocky relationship with The Telegram, bringing a series of libel suits against it and threatening to withdraw all government advertising.

The paper has not explicitly endorsed candidates during recent general elections. It does not shy away from political criticism, however, and in the late 2000s, under Transcontinental ownership, the paper had been quite critical at various times of both the federal Conservatives under Stephen Harper, and to a lesser extent the provincial Progressive Conservatives under Danny Williams. However, during the same period, it did not express any particular confidence in opposing parties such as the Liberals.

== Notable Staff and Community Ties ==
The Telegram's current managing editor is Jennifer Vardy Little.

Well-known former Telegram journalists include Russell Wangersky, Harold Horwood, Ray Guy, and Albert Perlin. Other notable contributors to The Telegram include former editor and author Michael Harrington, artist Rae Perlin, writer/playwright Joan Sullivan, columnist Gwynne Dyer, former Newfoundland Prime Minister William F. Lloyd and former provincial NDP leader Peter Fenwick. The Telegram is the original publication venue of the monthly church history column by Dr Hans Rollmann.

Telegram sports editor Robin Short, whose career at the newspaper spanned 36 years before his death in 2021, was posthumously inducted into the Newfoundland and Labrador Hockey Hall of Fame and awarded a Premier's Medal for Arts, Heritage, Sports and Recreation.

In 2025, Telegram justice reporter Tara Bradbury was named winner of the inaugural Mike Critch Excellence in Crime Reporting Award, a prize established by Canadian actor/comedian/writer Mark Critch in honour of his late father, longtime radio journalist Mike Critch, and administered by the Atlantic Journalism Awards.

The Telegram has sponsored the Tely 10 Mile Road Race annually since 1927, and the provincial men's senior hockey trophy, the Herder Cup, is named for William Herder.

The Telegram presented The Cuffer Prize, an annual literary contest, between 2008 and 2015. Overseen by editor/columnist Pam Frampton, the prize celebrated short fiction set in Newfoundland and Labrador, by new and established writers in the region. Winners include Joel Thomas Hynes and Eva Crocker. Top selections from the entries were published by Creative Book Publishing in annual editions of The Cuffer Anthology, with a portion of the sale proceeds donated to Literacy Newfoundland and Labrador.

The Telegram is Newfoundland and Labrador's largest newspaper, and published seven days a week from 1989 to 2008, when it reverted to a single weekend paper published on Saturday as The Weekend Telegram. Its tagline is "The People's Paper", accompanied by the provincial flag. The title is printed in Old English Text font.

== See also ==
- List of newspapers in Canada
