= Prairie Post =

Canadian newspaper in Alberta

- Type: Weekly newspaper
- Owner(s): Alta Newspaper Group
- Publisher: Ryan McAdams
- Managing editor: Ryan Dahlman
- Headquarters: Medicine Hat, Alberta
- Circulation: 17,449
- Website: www.prairiepost.com

The Prairie Post is a weekly newspaper for Canadian farmers in the southern areas of Alberta and Saskatchewan. It is published by Alta Newspaper Group.

The Prairie Post east edition is printed by the Medicine Hat News, while the west edition is printed by the Lethbridge Herald.
