= The Bancroft Times =

Canadian weekly newspaper

- Founder: John Bremmer
- Founded: 1894
- Headquarters: Bancroft, Ontario
- Sister newspapers: Bancroft This Week, Haliburton Echo, Minden Times
- ISSN: 0834-566X

The Bancroft Times is a weekly newspaper in Bancroft, Ontario, Canada, founded in 1894.

== History ==
The Bancroft Times was founded in late 1894 by John Bremmer. John Bremmer wrote and published about the newspaper on November 7th 1894 and then published the first edition on December 7th the same year. An annual subscription for the newspaper cost $1. The first offices were on Hastings Street North, Bancroft, Ontario.

John Bremmer sold the company to brothers David H. Morrison and W.E. Morrison in 1897 and launched a rival newspaper The Bancroft Recorder. W.E. Morrison left the company three years later. The company's offices relocated to Bridge Street on October 1899.

Harry Morton Price worked for the newspaper as an apprentice from 1905 until 1908 and bought the company on in late 1918.

Harry Morton Price's stepson Stanley Russel Walker joined the company as an apprentice in 1927. When he left to take part in the Second World War, the production was done by Harry Morton Price and Hilda Allerbeck (Stanley Russel Walker's sister). When Stanley Russel Walker returned from the war, he became a business partner and co-owner of the newspaper with Harry Morton Price. Harry Morton Price's health forced him to retire in 1957.

In 1963, Stanley Russel Walker relocated the offices to 93 Hastings Street North. Stanley Russel Walker died in 1965 and his wife Eva, and their four sons, Frank, David, Dean and Roger, managed the publication. Eva died in 1999 and Roger Walker left the business in 2000. Frank and Dean Walker sold the business to White Pine Media in June 2018. The paper's publisher is David Zilstra.
