= Norman Campbell =

Norman Campbell may refer to:

- Norman Campbell (politician) (c. 1804–1859), politician in early South Australia moved to Victoria
- Norman Robert Campbell (1880–1949), British physicist and philosopher of science
- Norm Campbell (footballer) (1919–1981), Australian rules footballer
- Norman Campbell (director) (1924–2004), Canadian television director and producer
- Norman Campbell (footballer) (born 1999), Jamaican footballer
- Norman R.C. Campbell, Canadian professor of medicine
- Norm Campbell (rugby league) (1908–1985), New Zealand rugby league player
