= Sault This Week =

Canadian newspaper in Ontario

- Type: Weekly newspaper
- Format: Tabloid
- Owner: Postmedia
- Founded: 1967
- Website: saultthisweek.com

Sault This Week was a Canadian weekly tabloid community newspaper, established in 1967, owned by Postmedia and based in Sault Ste. Marie, Ontario. In addition to the newspaper itself, Sault This Week published magazines and supplements focusing on various topics. The newspaper was delivered free of charge.

The final edition was published on June 25, 2026.

== See also ==
- List of newspapers in Canada
