= Orono Weekly Times =

Canadian newspaper in Ontario

- Orono Weekly Times office
- Type: Weekly newspaper
- Founder: Roy A. Forrester
- Founded: 1937
- ISSN: 0834-6844
- Website: www.oronoweeklytimes.com

The Orono Weekly Times is a weekly newspaper published in Orono, Ontario, beginning in 1937.

== History ==
The Orono Weekly Times was started by Roy A. Forrester on January 28, 1937, to fill the void left by the News ending the year previous. Roy A. was born in Clinton, Ontario, and spent 12 years in the printing trade in Beeton. In 1935 he purchased the Oakville Star, leaving two years later for Orono. His tenure lasted until the early 1950s, when his son Roy Clarence/Charles is listed as publisher in the March 1st, 1951 issue.

Popular columns over the years have included “Farm Front” by John Russell, “Your Family counselor” by Anne Hirst, “Chronicles of Ginger Farm” by Gwendoline D. Clarke and Arthur Black’s “Basic Black”. Featured comics included “Jitter” by Arthur Pointer and “Regular Fellers” by Gene Byrnes, and the wartime issues are a fantastic resource, featuring full pages of 1940s era comics. The paper has historically reported on news for communities such as Clarke, Cowanville, Newtonville, Kirby, Kendal, Leskard, Newcastle, Tyrone and Wesleyville.

Roy C. was a veteran of the Royal Canadian Navy in World War II, and an avid naturalist that has a butterfly garden named for him on the Orono Crown Lands. Roy took over for his father in 1951, publishing the paper until retiring in May 1995. He was a supporter of incorporation for the town in the 1960s, fought for a municipal water supply as a Police Trustee and won on his third attempt, and a long-time proponent of the Clarke Library Board, being involved with obtaining the Wadell house at the corner of Church and Centre Street for a public library. He was a member of Orono’s Chamber of Commerce, a founding member of the Clarington Concert Band, and spent much of his time after retirement helping the development of the Oak Ridges Moraine Trail. Roy C. was honoured by the town with Roy Forrester Day, on June 7, 2009, months after dying on January 25, 2009.

Roy C., founding publisher

"“The public library is a way of escape from the narrow area of our individual lives into the field of the wisdom and experience of all mankind.”"

— Roy C., founding publisher

In April 1995 the paper was purchased by Troy Young. Young had made the pages of the newspaper during the early 1980s, as a hockey player and pictured with the Orono Scouts. Young was with Times until January 1997, when it was acquired by Herman and Margaret Zwart, who had a previous printing relationship with Roy Clarence. In August 2018 the Times was sold to Orono Publications Inc., Julie Cashin-Oster Editor/Publisher. Cashin-Oster grew up in Orono, graduated from Clarke High School in the early 80s and worked at the Times early in her career. Cashin-Oster brings with her almost two decades of print and broadcast journalism experience with her as she carries on the tradition. The paper publishes today from 5310 Main Street in Orono.

== See also ==
- List of newspapers in Canada
