= North Thompson Star/Journal =

Canadian newspaper in British Columbia

- Type: Weekly newspaper
- Publisher: Al Kirkwood
- Editor: Jill Hayward
- Founded: 1974
- Language: English
- Headquarters: Barriere, British Columbia, Canada
- Circulation: 1,486 (as of 2022)
- Website: North Thompson Star/Journal

North Thompson Star/Journal is a newspaper in Barriere, British Columbia published weekly. Serving the North Thompson Valley from Heffley Creek to Blue River, the Star/Journal focuses on issues and events. North Thompson Star/Journal became a paid-distribution newspaper March 6, 2006

== See also ==
- List of newspapers in Canada
