= The Record (Sherbrooke) =

Canadian newspaper in Quebec

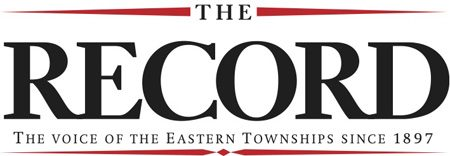
- Type: Daily newspaper
- Format: Compact
- Owner(s): Alta Newspaper Group
- Founded: 1897
- Political alignment: Canadian federalism, has both Conservative and Liberal columnists
- Headquarters: 1195, rue Galt Est; Sherbrooke, Quebec; J1G 1Y7
- Circulation: 4,049 daily (as of 2011)
- ISSN: 0841-6869
- OCLC number: 252411989
- Website: www.sherbrookerecord.com

September 4, 1915 edition of the paper.

The Record is the only daily (Monday–Friday) English language newspaper based in Sherbrooke, Quebec, Canada. It serves the Eastern Townships region of that province. It is one of the French-speaking province's last two English-language dailies; the other is the Montreal Gazette, which serves the anglophone community in Montreal.

Launched on February 9, 1897, by businessman Leonard Channell and originally known as the Sherbrooke Daily Record, it is one of the two last surviving English-language daily newspapers in the French-speaking province, the other being the much larger Montreal Gazette.

For the past several years, The Record has been a daily community newspaper for the anglophone minority in the Eastern Townships, without comprehensive coverage of national and world news.

"Talk", or "Talk of the Townships", a weekly television, arts and cultural insert, appears every Friday. Periodic sections focus on individual communities and events within the Record's service area.

Future Canadian media barons John W. H. Bassett and Conrad Black both got their starts in newspaper ownership as owner and co-owner, respectively, of the Sherbrooke Daily Record.

For years The Record was owned by Black's Hollinger International. In January 2006 it was purchased by Alta Newspaper Group, a partnership of Glacier Ventures International and former Hollinger executive David Radler.

== Fire ==
In January 1999, a fire broke out in The Record's offices, which were located on rue Delorme in Sherbrooke. The building and its contents, including the newspapers computers and presses, suffered heavy losses. The newspaper was temporarily moved to a location in nearby Lennoxville without its own press. A replacement press was eventually purchased and in June 2000 the newspaper moved into its current location on rue Galt Est, in Sherbrooke.

== Former editors ==
- Leonard S. Channell, 1897–1899
- Victor E. Morrill, 1899–1909
- Harry Logie, 1909–1919
- Gordon Miller, 1919–1930
- Alfred Wood, 1930–1935
- Gordon Miller, 1935–1937
- J.K. Flaherty, ?-?
- Albert Reid, ?-?
- Don McMahon, ?-?
- Douglas Amaron, ?-?
- Gerald McDuff, ?-?
- George McFarlane, ?-?
- Arnold Agnew, ?-1959
- John Cranford, 1959–1963
- Hugh Doherty, 1963–1968
- Leonard Ryan, 1968–1969
- Leonard Coates, 1969–1970
- William Duff, 1970
- Paul Waters, 1971
- Ivy Weir, [nee Pankovitch], 1971
- C. Scott Abbott, 1971–1972
- Lewis Harris, 1972–1973
- Alex Radmanovich, 1973–1974
- Hugh Tait, 1974
- Barbara Verity, [Stevenson], 1974–1977
- James Duff, 1977–1981
- Charles Bury, 1981–1996
- Sharon McCully, 1996-2006
- Eleanor Brown, 2006-?
- Jennifer Young, ? -2009
- Michael McDevitt, (interim editor 2009) (assistant editor 2010)
- Daniel Coulombe, 2010-2014
- John Edwards, 2014- 2015
- Matthew McCully, Gordon Lambie assoc editors 2015- 2019
- Matthew McCully 2019–present

== See also ==
- List of newspapers in Canada
