= The Chronicle-Journal =

Canadian daily newspaper in Ontario

- Newspaper of the Northwest
- Type: Daily newspaper
- Format: Broadsheet
- Owner(s): Continental Newspapers Canada Ltd.
- Publisher: Hilda Caverly (Interim)
- Editor: Greg Giddens
- Founded: 1972
- Language: English
- Headquarters: 75 South Cumberland Street; Thunder Bay, Ontario; P7B 1A3
- Circulation: 17,218 weekdays 18,901 Saturdays; 16,914 Sundays (as of 2015)
- ISSN: 0842-0084
- Website: www.chroniclejournal.com

The Chronicle-Journal is the daily newspaper in Thunder Bay, Ontario, Canada. Unlike many Canadian newspapers, it does not use the city's name in its masthead. The paper has an average weekday circulation of 17,200.

The paper is owned by Continental Newspapers Canada Ltd.

== History ==
The Chronicle-Journal's name is a combination of the names of the Daily Times-Journal of Fort William and the News-Chronicle of Port Arthur.

The Daily Times-Journal was created in 1899 when the Fort William Journal merged with the Fort William Times. In 1902 the Daily Times-Journal became the second newspaper in Canada to adopt a weekly payment plan for paper carriers. The News-Chronicle was first published in 1899.

In 1972, after the amalgamation of Port Arthur and Fort William into the city of Thunder Bay, the newspapers merged and became the afternoon daily Chronicle-Journal meant primarily for Thunder Bay city readers and the morning daily Times-News that was circulated throughout Northwestern Ontario and also in the city. The newspaper relocated to its current building in 1977. On April 17, 1996, publication of the morning Times-News ceased and the Chronicle-Journal became a morning publication. David Radler is the principal owner of Continental Newspapers, which includes The Chronicle-Journal. Since early 2006, the newspaper's editorial staff has shrunk from 23 employees to its current level, of 4 or 5. At one point, the newspaper's editorial department only had one reporter working in the entire city of Thunder Bay.

== See also ==
- Canadan Sanomat
- List of newspapers in Canada
