= The Daily Courier (Kelowna) =

Daily Courier
- Type: Daily newspaper
- Owner: Continental Newspapers
- Editor: James Miller
- Founded: 1904
- Language: English
- Headquarters: 101 186 Nanaimo Ave West; Penticton, British Columbia; V2A 1N4
- Circulation: 2,300; Wednesday; 2,300 Saturday (as of 2026)
- ISSN: 0842-0092
- Website: www.kelownadailycourier.ca

The Kelowna Courier is a local newspaper in Kelowna, British Columbia, Canada.

The newspaper covers a wide range of topics, including local news, sports, business, entertainment, and community events. It has a print circulation of around 2,300 copies per day and also has an online edition, which is updated regularly with breaking news and other content.

== See also ==
- List of newspapers in Canada
