= The Grapevine (newspaper) =

Canadian newspaper in Nova Scotia

- Type: Monthly
- Owner(s): Danielle Wisen, Allyson Mannette
- Publisher: GV Publishing Inc.
- Founded: 2004
- Language: English
- Headquarters: Wolfville, Nova Scotia, Canada
- Circulation: 5,000
- Website: grapevinepublishing.ca

The Grapevine is a free arts, culture, and community newspaper in the Annapolis Valley. It is distributed from Windsor to Annapolis Royal with a circulation of 5,000. The paper is owned by GV Publishing Inc.

== History ==
The paper was founded in 2004 by Acadia University student Adam Barnett. It began as an 8-page 8.5x11 paper printed at the university and distributed primarily to the Wolfville area. Its founders goal was to bring attention to all the cultural happenings in the area. In 2007, local musicians Andy Flinn & Ariana Nasr took over the paper.

In 2009 Jocelyn Hatt and Jeremy Novak took ownership. In May 2013 The Grapevine switched to printing on newsprint. They released 16-28 page issues that covered the thriving arts and entertainment scene and grew the distribution area from Windsor to Berwick.

In 2016, The Grapevine incorporated under new ownership of a team of five people whom had been working for the paper. The paper is delivered to over 800 locations with 5,000 issues printed bi-weekly.

== See also ==
- List of newspapers in Canada
