= Ontario Farmer =

Agricultural tabloid newspaper in Ontario, Canada

- Type: Bi-monthly newspaper
- Format: Tabloid
- Owner: Postmedia Network
- Publisher: Dean Mulharrem
- Editor: Peter Epp
- Founded: 1966
- Headquarters: 365 Bloor Street East; Toronto, Ontario, Canada
- Website: www.ontariofarmer.com

Ontario Farmer, formerly Today's Farmer is an agricultural tabloid newspaper, published every other Tuesday, and serving approximately 18,000 rural households in the counties of Essex, Kent, Lambton, Middlesex and Elgin counties in Southwestern Ontario.

== History ==
Today's Farmer was established when Voice of the Farmer and Farm Market merged in January 2008. Voice of the Farmer was established in 1966 in Dresden, Ontario, while Farm Market was established in 1997 in Chatham.

Dean Mulharrem is publisher of Today's Farmer, while Peter Epp is the editor. Coincidentally, Epp was editor of Voice of the Farmer from 1986 to 1996, and helped launched Farm Market in March 1997.

== See also ==
- List of newspapers in Canada
