= Journal Pioneer =

Canadian newspaper in Prince Edward Island

- Type: Weekly Newspaper
- Format: Broadsheet
- Owner(s): SaltWire Network
- Editor: Brad Works
- Founded: 1865, as Summerside Journal
- Headquarters: 316 Water Street; Summerside, Prince Edward Island; C1N 4K5
- Circulation: 8,021 weekdays 8,134 Saturdays (as of 2010)
- Website: journalpioneer.com

The Journal Pioneer is a weekly newspaper published in Summerside, Prince Edward Island, Canada.

== History ==
Two men named Bernard and Bertram founded the Summerside Journal, a weekly newspaper, in 1865. Under the leadership of A.R. Brennan, the Journal began publishing daily on September 21, 1939, in order to provide regular news of World War II. After the war, the Journal cut down to twice-weekly publication, then tri-weekly in 1949 after it closed a sister paper, The P.E. Island Agriculturalist.

After a fire at the press plant in 1947, the Journal was printed at the presses of its rival paper, The Pioneer, which had been founded in 1876 in Alberton, moving to Summerside in 1880. The papers merged into The Journal-Pioneer in 1951, and adopted a daily (weekdays) publishing schedule in October 1957. A Saturday edition was added two years later.

In 1972 the Sterling Group, part of Hollinger Inc., bought the Journal-Pioneer; it was sold to CanWest in 2000 who then sold it to Transcontinental in 2002. On April 13, 2017, Transcontinental announced that it had sold all of its newspapers in Atlantic Canada to SaltWire Network, a newly formed parent company of The Chronicle Herald. The company also owns The Guardian in the provincial capital of Charlottetown, Prince Edward Island. While the Journal Pioneer's newsroom is in Summerside, its printing facilities are located in Borden-Carleton.

In March 2020 Halifax based SaltWire Network stopped publishing the print edition of the Journal Pioneer citing financial challenges caused by the COVID-19 pandemic. It was announced in October 2020 that in November the Journal Pioneer would be returning to print as a weekly publication.

== See also ==
- List of newspapers in Canada
