= Yellowknifer =

Newspaper in Yellowknife, Northwest Territories

Coordinates: 62°27′08″N 114°22′07″W

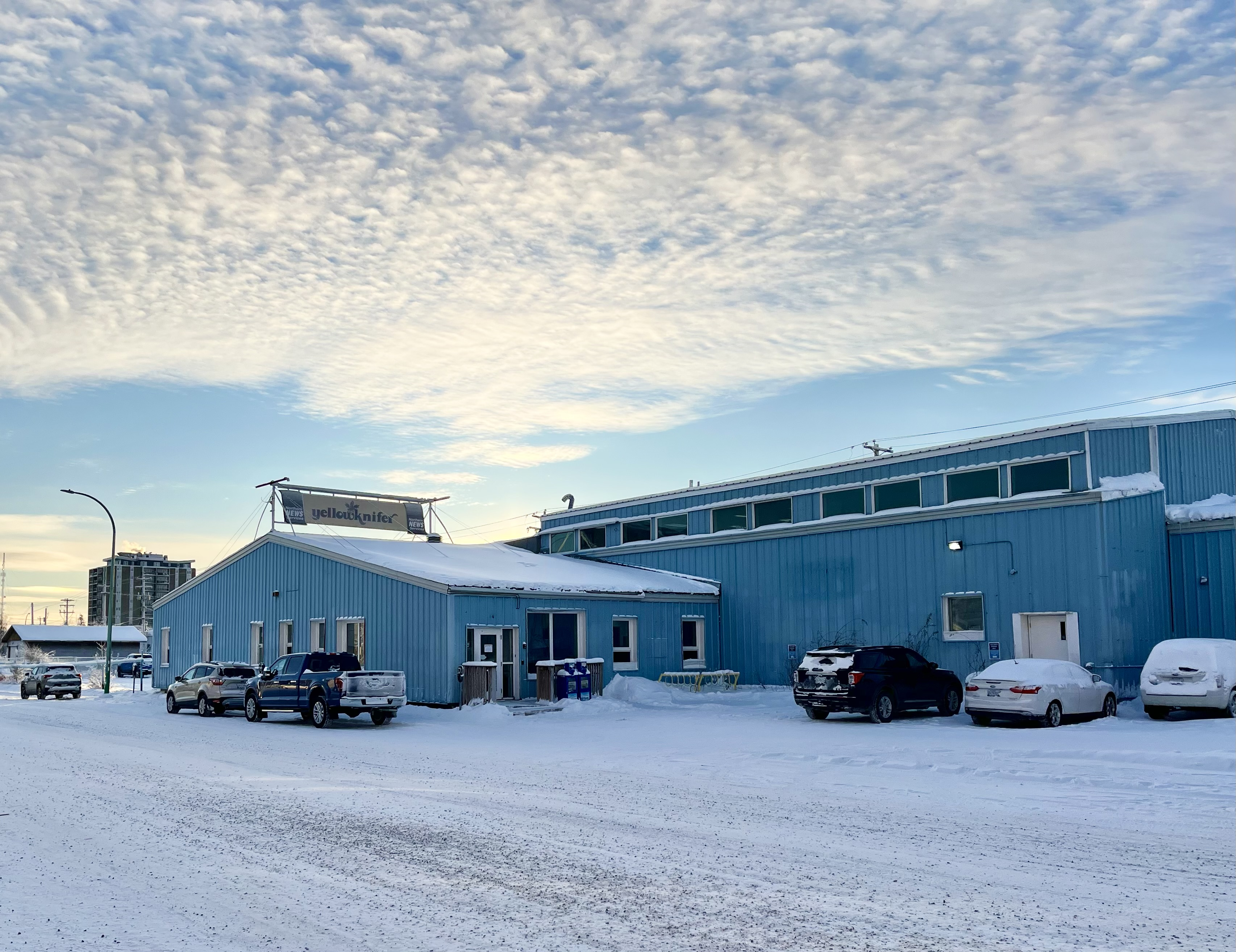
- Type: Weekly newspaper
- Format: Compact
- Owner: Northern News Services
- Publisher: J.W. (Sig) Sigvaldason
- Editor: Mike W. Bryant
- Founded: March 22, 1972
- Headquarters: Yellowknife, Northwest Territories
- Circulation: 2.059 Wednesday; 2,148 Friday (as of October 2022)
- ISSN: 0844-0697
- Website: nnsl.com/yellowknifer/

The Yellowknifer is a newspaper based in Yellowknife, Northwest Territories and owned by Northern News Services.

It was first published on March 22, 1972, by J.W. (Sig) Sigvaldson, who remains the current publisher. Both a Wednesday and a Friday edition are printed weekly, with 2015 circulations of 3,911 and 4,082 respectively. Its mission statement is "having a ball and making a buck".

Sigvaldson started the paper after leaving rival paper News of the North in 1971 after courting controversy from both the federal and municipal government, recruiting Jack Adderly who had also left the paper. Initial print runs were produced at home, using the bathroom as a darkroom. The paper was not commercially successful during its early years and was kept afloat by income from Sigvaldson's wife. By 1978, the paper had become a financial success, and Sigvaldson purchased News of the North, renaming it News/North.

The paper focuses on local community news in the city, with some occasional coverage of wider issues in Northwest Territories and Northern Canada generally. The paper is published in English, but still has a significant number of Indigenous readers.

The paper ceased it's Friday edition, going from biweekly to weekly publiation.

== See also ==
- List of newspapers in Canada
