= Trenton Trentonian =

Canadian newspaper in Ontario

- Type: Weekly newspaper
- Format: Tabloid
- Owner: Postmedia
- Editor: Brice McVicar
- Founded: 1956
- Language: English
- Headquarters: 199 Front St Suite #118, Belleville, ON K8N 5H5
- Website: www.trentonian.ca

The Trenton Trentonian is a weekly newspaper published in Quinte West, Ontario, Canada. Publishing under managing editor Jennifer Cowan, the Trentonian has won numerous provincial and national news awards through the Ontario Community Newspapers Association and the Canadian Community Newspapers Association.

== Early history ==
For over a half-century, the Trentonian has been the voice of record for the former town of Trenton, Ontario and the current city of Quinte West and its surrounding communities. Founded in 1956 and merged with the Brighton Ensign (founded 1871) by Senator W.A. Fraser, the Trentonian eventually absorbed the Trenton Courier Advocate (founded 1853) in the early 1960s to create a larger tri-weekly newspaper as a fresher alternative to the historical weeklies.

In its first editions, before it moved to a new location at 41 Quinte Street, state-of-the-art equipment and a working press were located in the rear of the building - printing was initially done in Picton, but getting started proved difficult. The paper's first editor-reporter-photographer, James M. Muir, recalled "We were ensconced in a vacated furniture store in downtown Trenton, deep in planning the most awkward newspaper operation with which I've ever been associated."

Despite these hardships, Muir said The Trentonian was readily welcomed by readers because it carried local news photos, something the Courier-Advocate had still not caught onto; he noted that the Trentonian's initial appeal may have been due to its more extensive coverage of the Royal Canadian Air Force base near town.

The Trentonian eventually formed a four-page base section distributed with Dominion grocery store flyers, which proved so successful that the Trentonian's owners were able to buy out the Courier-Advocate once and for all.

== Ownership ==
Years passed, and the paper left the hands of the James family and was sold to Ken Thomson, newspaper baron, who after more than 20 years of ownership passed the paper on to fellow newspaper mogul Conrad Black in 1997, becoming part and parcel of the Hollinger Newspapers Group. In the summer of 2001 the Trentonian, along with 29 other newspapers in Ontario, was purchased from Hollinger by Michael Sifton and Osprey Media Group Inc. In the summer of 2007, the Sun Media Corporation wing of Quebecor Inc. purchased Osprey and changed its full name to Osprey Media Publishing Inc., which now owns the Trentonian, the Belleville Intelligencer, the County Weekly News of Picton and the Community Press of Stirling. Today, the Quinte area papers all fall under Sun Media's banner. In 2015, Sun Media was acquired by Postmedia.

== See also ==
- List of newspapers in Canada
