= Valley Journal Advertiser =

Canadian newspaper in Nova Scotia

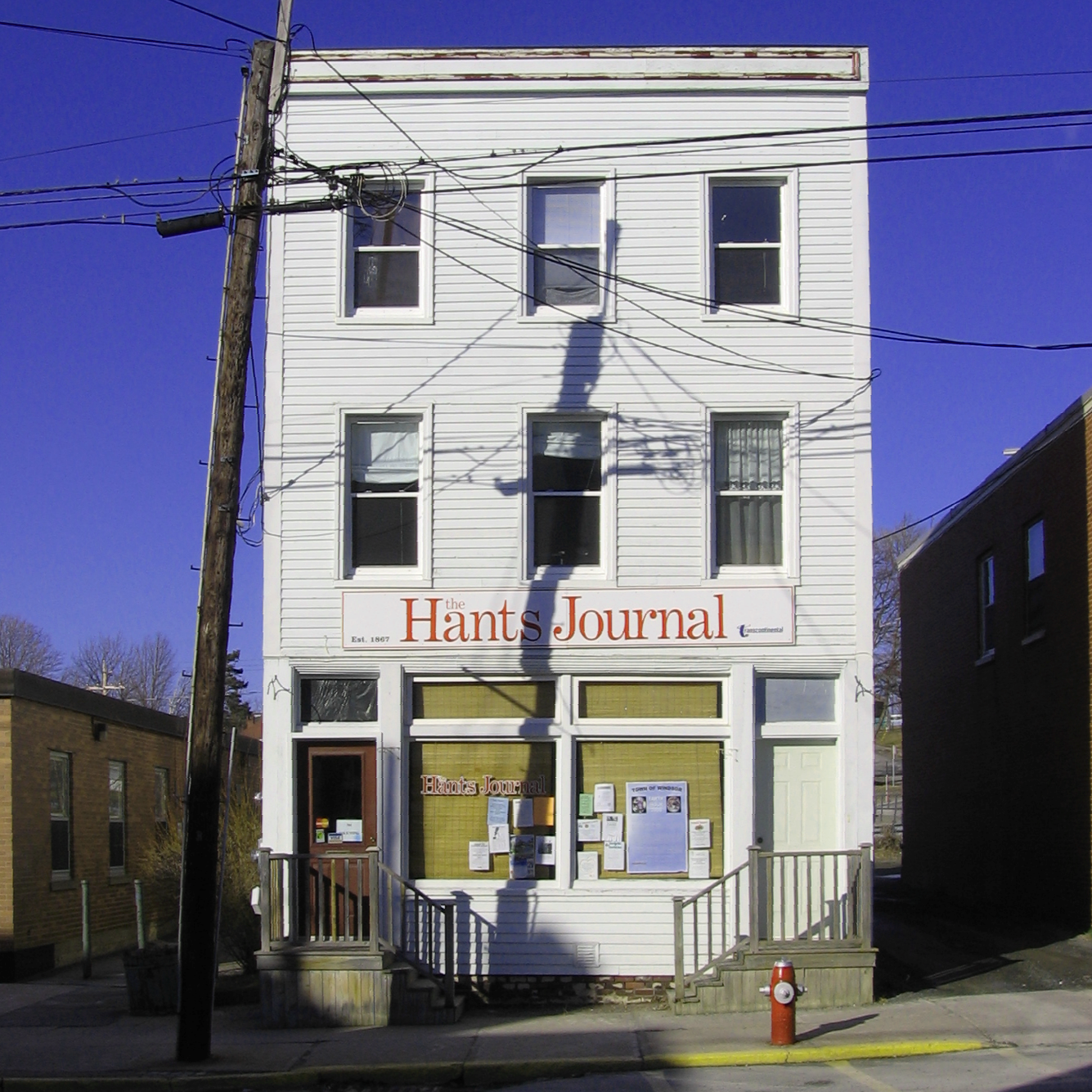
- Hants Journal building, Windsor, Nova Scotia
- Type: Weekly newspaper
- Format: Tabloid
- Owner: SaltWire Network
- Founded: 1867
- Language: English
- Headquarters: Windsor, Nova Scotia
- Circulation: 2,329
- Price: $1.15
- Website: Official website

The Valley Journal Advertiser is a weekly newspaper serving Annapolis, Kings and Hants counties in Nova Scotia. It was formed in 2016 by merging the formerly separate Hants Journal and Kings County Advertiser; although the two publications produce a single merged print edition covering both counties, website content remains targeted to each county under the separate titles.

The Hants Journal began publication in 1867 as the Saturday Mail, taking the name Hants Journal in 1870. It was at one time (1952-1957) owned by a woman, Kay Anslow.

It has a circulation of under 2,500.

== See also ==
- List of newspapers in Canada
