= The Flesherton Advance =

Canadian newspaper in Ontario

- Truth before favor - Principles, not men
- Type: Weekly newspaper
- Format: Broadsheet
- Owner: Wells Family
- Founder: A. R. Fawcett
- Founded: June 1st, 1881
- Language: English
- Website: heraldadvance.ca

The Flesherton Advance (now The Advance) is a weekly newspaper published in tandem with the Dundalk Herald based in Dundalk, Ontario, serving Grey Highlands. Founded in 1881, the paper was published in Flesherton until 1968 when purchased by the current publishers, the Walls family.

== History ==
=== 19th century ===
The Flesherton Advance was founded on April 1, 1881, by A. R. Fawcett. Both himself and future publisher W. H. Thurston were born in Euphrasia Township, Fawcett near Heathcote. His early connection with newspapers was as an apprentice at the Thornbury Standard. Fawcett was a member of the Artemesia Town Council, as well as being connected to the Osprey and Euphrasia Town Councils in the early and mid 1880s. He was also attended the Artemesia Agricultural Society Annual Meeting, was a member of the Ancient Order of United Workmen, the Sons of Temperance and married twice. His first wife, Amelia Buchanan, died on 21 February 1885, and he remarried the next January to a Maggie Carberry of Chingacousy. By the summer of 1888 the town's population had doubled to 600, and Fawcett had sold the paper on August 1 to W. H. Thurston. After 50 years, the paper never carried less than twelve columns of advertising, the same as its first issue. The same week he parted ways with the Advance, he also sold the newspaper and job printing plant of the Streetsville Review. He went on to Streetsville, then Toronto, before settling in Burk's Falls and went on to publish the Burks' Falls Arrow, a publication that ran from 1885 to 1966. He passed on August 2, 1919.

A front page reprint of Fawcett's recollection of the first days of setting up the paper, sham battles in the town during Louis Riel's rebellion, and columns by the Thurstons can be found in the June 3rd, 1931 issue.

William Hadley Thurston was born in 1859, seven years after his family had relocated to Kimberly from Lindsay, his family (John M. Thurston and Adeline Purdy) being one of the first pioneers of Kimberly Valley. At the age of 17 Thurston began an apprenticeship in Orangeville for two years before heading to the Durham Review. He then spent time as a writer and typesetter with the Toronto Daily World/Globe and World, and as an editor of the Owen Sound Tribune, where he would write that the Flesherton Advance was “another candidate for the poor house.” Not the only newspaper man in his family, his brother Alfred D. would hold an executive position with the Montreal Gazette. Thurston would serve as the first clerk of the newly incorporated village in 1912, up to being elected Reeve in 1927. A philatelist, photographer, mushroom hunter and taxidermist, Thurston owned the first pneumatic bike in the district. On editors, Thurston once said, "To be a live editor, I believe, is to endanger friendships, but after all it is not true friendship which falls before honest criticism." On January 4, 1884, Thurston married Kate Amelia Gaudin, with whom he would have four children. He retired from the paper in the August 24th, 1938 issue and died January 25th, 1939, leaving the paper in the hands of his son, F. J. Thurston.

=== 20th century ===
Frances James Thurston, born in 1901, first became involved with the paper from 1916 to 1919, leaving school to assist his father as many workers were overseas fighting. After leaving the paper he worked in the industry in Toronto and Winnipeg and returned to Flesherton in 1921, marrying Lillian Leoan White on January 11, 1923. Running the paper from his father's retirement in 1938 until 1961, his brother A. S. Thurston also wrote a column for the paper. Frank would return as editor in April 1966 for two years after working on the Thornbury Review and the Alliston Herald. Frank died in 1987, leaving five sons.

The intervening five years had seen Royden Johnston as publisher from September 1961. Johnston was born in the early 1930s, arrived in town in 1946, and made the front page of the Advance for scholastic achievements and a run-in with some local deer. In the spring of 1966, the paper was being published by Godfrey Clark. This only lasted two years, when Walter Walls and wife Phylis purchased the paper and shifted production in tandem with the Dundalk Herald. The Walls family have been at the paper ever since then, Matthew Walls succeeding his parents, followed by Cathy Walls, the paper still publishing as of 2019.

== Geographic coverage ==
The Advance had a circulation of 1,000 for its 6 column, 8 page sheet in the early 1920s for a town of 500 persons. The paper historically served the communities of Priceville, Inistioge, Maxwell, Feversham, Eugenia, Vandeleur, Kimberly, Portlaw, Proton, Wodehouse, Maxwell, Rock Mills and Ceylon.

== See also ==
- List of newspapers in Canada
