= Penticton Herald =

Newspaper in British Columbia

- Type: Daily newspaper
- Owner: Continental Newspapers
- Editor: James Miller
- Founded: 1906, as Penticton Press
- Language: English
- Headquarters: Penticton, British Columbia, Canada
- ISSN: 0844-2711
- Website: pentictonherald.ca

Penticton Herald is a local newspaper in Penticton, British Columbia, founded in 1906 by W. J. Clement. It was first known as Penticton Press and later changed to Penticton Herald in 1910. The Herald also publishes the Entertainment NOW TV Guide and Showcase Real Estate Guide. It is owned by Continental Newspapers.

== See also ==
- List of newspapers in Canada
