= Fort Macleod Gazette =

Newspaper in Alberta, Canada (est. 1882)

The Macleod Gazette
- Type: Weekly newspaper
- Format: Tabloid
- Owner: Macleod Gazette
- Publisher: Frank McTighe
- Editor: Frank McTighe
- Founded: 1882
- Headquarters: Fort Macleod, Alberta
- Circulation: 1,371
- Website: www.fortmacleodgazette.com

The Macleod Gazette is a weekly local newspaper in Fort Macleod, Alberta, Canada. It has been recognized as the best newspaper with its circulation size in Canada, as well as having the best editorial and best local sports pages. The Macleod Gazette is also part of the Regional, a co-operative regional newspaper between the Claresholm Local Press, High River Times, The Macleod Gazette, Nanton News, Okotoks Western Wheel and Vulcan Advocate.

== See also ==
- List of newspapers in Canada
