= Leader Spirit =

Canadian newspaper

Leader-Spirit
- Type: Weekly newspaper
- Format: Tabloid
- Owner: Postmedia
- Founded: 1965, 2008
- Language: English
- Headquarters: 254 Main Street, P.O. Box 490, Dresden, Ontario, N0P 1M0

The Leader-Spirit was a community newspaper serving the communities of Dresden, Bothwell and Thamesville, Ontario. Its first issue was published on December 31, 2008. The Leader-Spirit was a tabloid and was a paid paper that went to about 2,000 subscribers. The Leader-Spirit was an amalgamation of the Dresden Leader and the Spirit of Bothwell.

== History ==
The Leader was founded on Sept. 16, 1965 by Gord Clauws and Ted Misselbrook, and was originally known as the North Kent Leader. The Spirit of Bothwell was founded in April 1992 by Jim Kish. The Leader-Spirit's publisher is Dean Muharrem, and the reporter-photographer is April Colby.

The Leader Spirit ceased publication in August 2013.

== See also ==
- List of newspapers in Canada
