= SaltWire Network =

Canadian newspaper publishing company

SaltWire Network Inc.
- Type: Public
- Industry: Mass media
- Founded: April 13, 2017; 9 years ago
- Defunct: August 26, 2024
- Fate: Acquired by Postmedia Network
- Headquarters: Halifax, Nova Scotia, Canada
- Area served: Atlantic Canada
- Owner: Postmedia Network
- Website: www.saltwire.com

SaltWire Network Inc. was a Canadian newspaper publishing company. The company was formed in Halifax, Nova Scotia on April 13, 2017, via its purchase of 27 newspapers from Transcontinental. The company owned 23 daily and weekly newspapers in Atlantic Canada including The Chronicle Herald in Halifax, the Cape Breton Post in Sydney, Nova Scotia, and The Telegram in St. John's, Newfoundland.

In March 2024, SaltWire went into creditor protection. In July 2024, SaltWire agreed to be acquired by Postmedia Network, in a sale completed on August 26, 2024. During the first week of December 2024, Saltwire was rebranded as PNI Atlantic News and headquarters moved to Toronto.

== History ==
=== Formation ===
On April 13, 2017, Halifax's independently owned The Chronicle Herald announced its acquisition of 27 newspapers in the region from Transcontinental Media, via the newly formed parent company SaltWire Network. Transcontinental began a gradual exit from mainstream publishing in order to focus on specialty media and educational publishing. The exact purchase price was not disclosed, although business analysts estimated that the publications were worth approximately $30 million in total.

The deal came amid a year-long strike by the employees of The Chronicle Herald. The deal shocked striking staff because it meant that management had the money to buy a newspaper chain, while asking the union for concessions on benefits and wages because of money flow issues. The transaction was criticized by labour leaders because Herald management was essentially crying poor in negotiations. After being on the picket-lines for 18 months, with the help of a provincially appointed mediator, the strike finally came to an end in August 2017. 61 editors, writers and photographers went on strike, 26 were laid-off when the agreement passed, but management conceded to not replace laid off staff with non-unionized employees during the eight-year agreement.

=== Paywalls and downsizing ===
In June 2018, Saltwire Network changed the Carbonear, Newfoundland-based weekly newspaper, The Compass, from a subscriber model to a free total market product delivered as a flyer package wrap. July 2018 saw Saltwire Network close The Beacon, The Advertiser, The Pilot and The Nor'wester, and merge them into a free weekly known as The Central Voice. The new paper began publication on August 1, 2018.

In March 2019, all SaltWire publication websites introduced metered paywalls. At the end of March 2019, the company terminated its affiliation with the Canadian Press newswire service, opting instead to become a client of Postmedia and Reuters. In March 2019, SaltWire announced it was putting 10 of its newspaper buildings up for sale, including the headquarters for the Cape Breton Post, and the St. John's Telegram's.

In April 2019, SaltWire announced it was turning Corner Brook-based The Western Star into a weekly delivered free to consumers as a flyer wrap. This resulted in the layoff of around 30 employees. Independent delivery contractors were also affected. At the same time, it was announced that the two Labrador weeklies would merge into one called The Labrador Voice, which closed a year later.

In April 2019, SaltWire filed a lawsuit in the Supreme Court of Nova Scotia against Transcontinental, accusing it of overstating and misrepresenting details surrounding the revenue of the papers it had acquired. The company threatened a counter-suit, stating that the sale was "conducted based on fair, accurate and timely information", and accusing SaltWire of failing to "fulfil its payment obligations".

=== Bankruptcy and sale ===
In March 2024, both lender Fiera Private Debt and SaltWire applied to place the media company under creditor protection. Fiera was owed over $32 million. On July 26, 2024, Postmedia Network entered an agreement to purchase SaltWire. When the sale was announced, SaltWire employed about 800 independent contractors and 390 staff (including Halifax Herald Ltd.).

At an insolvency court hearing in Halifax, on August 8, 2024, a Nova Scotia Supreme Court justice approved the sale. Postmedia completed the transaction on August 26, 2024.

Postmedia did not buy all of SaltWire's assists. The biggest asset left unsold was the Newfoundland printing plant that was used by The Telegram and other community papers.The Telegram therefore announced that it would discontinue daily publishing after August 24, 2024, and convert to a weekly published on Fridays. The Cape Breton Post building on George Street in Sydney was sold in October 2024, after the building became surplus with the paper being printed at the same press as the Halifax Herald.

== Becoming PNI Atlantic News ==
About a month after Postmedia's takeover, about 30 percent of SaltWire's staff were laid off, including management, editorial staff, and writers, including cartoonist Michael de Adder. During the first week of December 2024, Postmedia rebranded SaltWire as PNI Atlantic News, with their websites and print editions changing to look like the parent company's other newspapers and their head office moved to Toronto.

== Publications ==
=== Newfoundland and Labrador ===
- The Telegram (St. John's)
- West Coast Wire (Free weekly)
- The Central Wire (Free weekly)

=== Nova Scotia ===
- Annapolis Valley Register (Windsor)
- Bedford Wire (Free weekly)
- Cape Breton Post (Sydney)
- The Casket (Antigonish)
- The Chronicle Herald (Nova Scotia)
- Clayton Park Wire (Free weekly)
- Coastal Wire (Free weekly)
- Cobequid Wire (Free weekly)
- Colchester Wire (Truro)
- Cole Harbour Wire (Free weekly)
- Cumberland Wire (Free weekly)
- Dartmouth Wire (Free weekly)
- Halifax Wire (Free weekly)
- South Shore Breaker (Free weekly)
- Southwest Wire (Free weekly)
- The Tri-County Vanguard (Yarmouth)
- The News (Pictou)
- Truro News (Truro)
- Valley Journal Advertiser (Windsor)
- Valley Wire (Free weekly)

=== Prince Edward Island ===
- The Guardian (Charlottetown)
- The Journal-Pioneer (Summerside)
