= Ian Jordaan =

Canadian civil engineer

Ian Jordaan is a Canadian civil engineer who has made contributions to the design of offshore structures for harsh, cold environments. He is a professor emeritus and university research professor in the Faculty of Engineering and Applied Science at Memorial University of Newfoundland.

Jordaan's contributions to engineering and applied science lie in two main areas: mechanics and probabilistic analysis. His work in mechanics has focused on inelastic, time-dependent and nonlinear behaviour of materials and the related analysis of structural systems.

== Early life and education ==
Ian Jordaan was born in 1939 and grew up in South Africa. He received his bachelor's and master's degrees in civil engineering from the University of the Witwatersrand, in Johannesburg. Jordaan's political views were socialist and pro Nelson Mandela, and at that time there was a racial right-wing government under Verwoerd, all while Mandela was incarcerated on Robben Island. He did not wish to live in a racially segregated society and decided to leave the country in 1965. He found employment with Arup and also pursued his PhD from the University of London, King's College, U.K.

== Career ==
After obtaining his PhD, Jordaan immigrated to Canada in 1969 to teach at the University of Calgary in their Civil Engineering Department.

In 1982, he joined DNV as a consultant for their Cold Technology Center. He eventually became the head of their research and development department.

In 1986, Jordaan was appointed to the Natural Sciences and Engineering Research Council (NSERC)-Mobil Industrial Research Chair in Ocean Engineering at Memorial University in St. John’s, Newfoundland and Labrador. He continued his work on ice-structure interaction, with particular focus on challenges to oil and gas development in the Canadian offshore.

Jordaan has made contributions to industry by providing advice on design issues and research approaches on a broad variety of offshore and Arctic projects. He led design loads studies for the Terra Nova and White Rose Floating Production, Storage and Offloading Systems (FPSOs), as well as the Hebron project. He also studied and assessed the pressures measured on the Molikpaq structure in the Beaufort Sea during 1986.

Jordaan was a principal consultant for Ice Engineering with C-CORE, a Canadian research and development company specializing in harsh environment technology innovation. He developed methods of analysis for the ice loads on structures in the shallow Caspian Sea and consulted on structural concepts for the Shtokman gas project in the deepwater Barents Sea. He also worked with the C-CORE Ice Engineering team on design loads for the Confederation Bridge 13-kilometre-long (8.1 mi) connecting Prince Edward Island and New Brunswick.

Jordaan contributed to the Revisions to the Canadian Arctic Shipping Pollution Prevention Regulations, the expert panel of the RSC to study science and environmental risk issues related to oil and gas development offshore British Columbia, and to the development of ISO 19906, an international standard on Arctic offshore structures.

Jordaan is a Fellow of the Royal Society of Canada. He was awarded the Horst Leipholz Medal in 1999 for his contributions to mechanics for his work on compressive ice failure, the P.L. Pratley Award in 2001 and the Casimir Gzowski Award in 2018, all from the Canadian Society for Civil Engineering. The ASME 2015 34th International Conference on Ocean, Offshore and Arctic Engineering held a special symposium in honour of Dr. Jordaan for his contributions to ice engineering.

== Selected publications ==
=== Books ===
- Jordaan, I.J., Mechanics of Ice Failure: an Engineering Analysis. Cambridge University Press, 2023, 229 pp.
- Jordaan, I.J., Decisions under Uncertainty: Probabilistic Analysis for Engineering Decisions. Cambridge University Press, 2005, 672 pp.

=== Technical papers ===
(sample of 150 published papers)

- Kavanagh, M. and Jordaan, I. 2022. Time-dependent fracture of ice. Engineering Fracture Mechanics, Vol 276, Part A, Paper 108850. https://doi.org/10.1016/j.engfracmech.2022.108850
- Jordaan, I., Hewitt, K. and Frederking, R. 2018. Re-evaluation of ice loads on the Molikpaq structure measured during the 1985–86 season. Can. J. Civ. Eng. 45: 153–166 (2018). https://doi.org/10.1139/cjce-2016-0444
- Jordaan, I. 2015. Some issues in ice mechanics. Proceedings of the 34th International Conference on Ocean, Offshore and Arctic Engineering, Paper No. OMAE 2015-42042. https://doi.org/10.1115/OMAE2015-42042
- Jordaan, I. and Gosine, P. 2012. The Titanic disaster and ice mechanics: completing the picture. IceTech 2012, Banff, Alberta, September 2012, Paper ICETECH12-149-R0, https://doi.org/10.5957/ICETECH-2012-149
- Jordaan, I.J. Mechanics of ice-structure interaction. Engineering Fracture Mechanics, 2001; 68:1923-1960 https://doi.org/10.1016/S0013-7944(01)00032-7
