= Carolyn Relf =

Canadian geologist

- Born: Purse, Ontario, Canada
- Education: Queen's University
- Scientific career
- Fields: Geology
- Workplaces: Yukon Geological Survey
- Academic advisors: John Reid

Carolyn Relf is a Canadian geologist. She has served as director of the Yukon Geological Survey (since January 2008), project geologist with the Government of the Northwest Territories, chief geologist with Indigenous and Northern Affairs Canada, federal co-manager of the Northwest Territories' Geoscience Office, director of the Mineral and Petroleum Resources for Indian and Northern Affairs Canada, as well as adjunct professor at the University of Alberta.

== Career ==
Relf's early career life began in Yellowknife, North West Territories. After receiving her PhD she began work with the Northwest Territories (NWT) government as a project geologist. She eventually rose up and became Chief Geologist for Indian and Northern Affairs Canada (INAC). Relf was the only female in her crew despite other women existing in her field. Through networking, Relf eventually landed a role as the Director of Yukon Geological Surveying in 2008. After 17 years in the position, Relf retired in 2025 and has since been appointed to the Board of Governors at Yukon University.

Throughout her time in Yellowknife, Relf attended a conference with several of her University of Queens peers within the surveying industry, in which offered training and preparation for future careers in geology. Through their many successful field expeditions, Relf's team acquired recognition from the federal government of Canada, and received grant funding for developing university curriculum in the field of geological science. This brought Relf to the University of Alberta in Edmonton, a common point for geologists due to it's proximity to the working in the Yukon, specifically being that it is the closest metropolis city to Yellowknife. The University of Alberta had a large stake in the geological projects occurring in Yellowknife and much of its research on campus was based on the field of the North West Territory.

Relf reached out to the University of Alberta and used the funding from Indian and Northern Affairs Canada kick start a program which would better educate students on geological survey methods. Every fall, Relf's team would bring 4-6 chosen students to join them in their field surveys, to produce geological maps of areas within the NWT. Teaching became a passion of Relf's, and her fieldwork with university students became her legacy. She did her last year of field training in 2007, after 7 years of teaching at the U of A.

Although Relf was often in a minority role, as a female within the field of geology, she affirms that over the course of the 7 graduating classes that she taught throughout her time at the University of Alberta, all of which were an even distribution of men and women. At the height of her career, Relf currently has an even mapping crew of 3-3 male to female geologists. Her survey crew is actually 3-1 female dominated, and her mineral crew is 4-1 male dominated, a fairly even distribution overall.

== Education ==
Relf's high school teacher John Reid, a working geologist, was her first memory of exposure to the field of geology. Reid took Relf's entire high school class on a 5-day geological field trip, which inspired her to pursue further education in the field of Geology.

When Relf graduated high school, she moved from Mississauga, Ontario to Kingston, Ontario to attend (Queen's University, 1984) to complete her undergrad degree in Geological Science. She would later do her masters in geochemistry and mineral chemistry at (Memorial University of Newfoundland, 1988) and a Ph.D. in structural geology, metamorphic petrology, and Archean tectonics back in Kingston at (Queen's University, 1992).

== Personal life ==
Dr. Caroyln Relf grew up in the suburbs of Mississauga, Ontario with 3 other siblings (David, Heather and Robert). Her father was a high school science teacher, having obtained his degree in chemistry. Relf is married to a geologist; they have a daughter born in 2001.

Relf is also very active, participating in many races such as the Yukon River Quest which is 715 km in 2016, 2017, 2018, 2019, 2022, 2023, 2024, 2025, 2026. She races with Stix Together who have raised $140,000 since 2016 for Yukon Cancer Care Fund and practice 3 times a week. She's recently become president of the Whitehorse Women's Hockey Association (WWHA) for the 2026/2027 season
