= Neepawa Banner =

Canadian newspaper

Neepawa Banner & Press
- Founder(s): Ken and Christine Waddell
- Founded: 1989
- City: Neepawa, Manitoba
- Website: http://www.mywestman.ca/

The Neepawa Banner & Press is a newspaper in Neepawa, Manitoba.

== History ==
Established in 1989 by Ken and Christine Waddell, the paper was originally named the Neepawa Banner. The paper's first edition was printed on October 29, 1989, and included an initial print run of 3,000 copies distributed to Neepawa and surrounding communities.

The Banner office was originally located in the Moyer Dental building on Mountain Avenue and employed a staff of four. In 1990, the Banner moved to 272 Hamilton Street and later in the ‘90s, to 275 Hamilton Street in Hamilton Square (currently the Town of Neepawa office). In 1998, the paper once again moved, this time to its current location at 243 Hamilton Street.

In 1993, the Neepawa Banner expanded into Rivers, Manitoba with the purchase of the Rivers Gazette-Reporter and renamed it the Rivers Banner. For a short period of time, a third paper, the Hamiota Banner, was established in Hamiota, Manitoba. It operated from 1992-1995.

By 2014, the Neepawa Banner had established its weekly circulation numbers at 8,036 copies. It is currently one of the largest circulation weeklies in rural Manitoba, and largest rural weekly in Western Manitoba.

In September 2015, the Banner purchased its competition and one of Manitoba's oldest community newspapers, the Neepawa Press.

The Neepawa Press, which first published in 1896, was sold by Glacier Media Group to the Waddells. The Press would publish weekly, albeit with some changes in format and distribution.

After two years of running the Banner and the Press as separate newspapers, the pair were amalgamated. The final edition of the Neepawa Press as a stand-alone paper was published on September 27, 2017.

In 2018, the Banner & Press employs a workforce of seven full-time employees, several columnists as well as numerous part-time workers who perform flyer stuffing and newspaper distribution duties.
