= Wei Qiu =

Wei Qiu is the head of the Department of Ocean and Naval Architectural Engineering at Memorial University of Newfoundland.

== Education ==
Wei Qiu has a B.A.Sc. in naval architecture and a M.A.Sc. in ship structural mechanics from Dalian University of Technology. He then received a PhD in marine hydrodynamics from the Mechanical Engineering Department of Dalhousie University.

== Teaching ==
Qiu has previously served as the interim associate dean of research for the Department of Engineering. He is currently the head of the Department of Ocean and Naval Architectural Engineering at Memorial University of Newfoundland. In 2016 he received the Professional Engineers and Geoscientists of Newfoundland and Labrador's Teaching Award.

== Fellowships ==
He is a fellow of the Canadian Academy of Engineering, the Royal Institution of Naval Architects, and the Society of Naval Architects and Marine Engineers.
