= Donald Hillman =

Canadian paediatrician (1925–2006)

Donald Arthur Hillman
- Born: June 25, 1925; Montreal, Quebec
- Died: July 4, 2006 (aged 81); Ottawa, Ontario
- Occupation: paediatrician

He held positions at McMaster University, Universiti Sains Malaysia, Boston University, and the University of Ottawa.

== Biography ==
Born in Montreal, Quebec, he received a Bachelor of Science from McGill University in 1942. He received his Doctor of Medicine from the McGill University Medical School in 1949. In 1961, he received a Ph.D. in Investigative Medicine from McGill University.

From 1976 to 1989, he was a professor in Memorial University of Newfoundland’s Faculty of Medicine as well as physician-in-chief at the Janeway Child Health Centre in St. John's, Newfoundland and Labrador.

He died in 2006 in Ottawa.

== Honours ==
In 1989, he and his wife Elizabeth Hillman were given the Canadian Paediatric Society Ross Award for Outstanding Achievements in Pediatrics. In 1992, they were award the Christopherson International Award by the American Academy of Pediatrics. In 1994, he and his wife Elizabeth Hillman were made Officers of the Order of Canada for having "consistently used their talents and energy to improve the welfare of children throughout the world". In 2004, he was awarded an honorary Doctor of Laws from Memorial University of Newfoundland.
