= Northern News Services =

Newspaper publisher in Yellowknife NWT, Canada

Coordinates: 62°27′08″N 114°22′07″W

NNSL Media
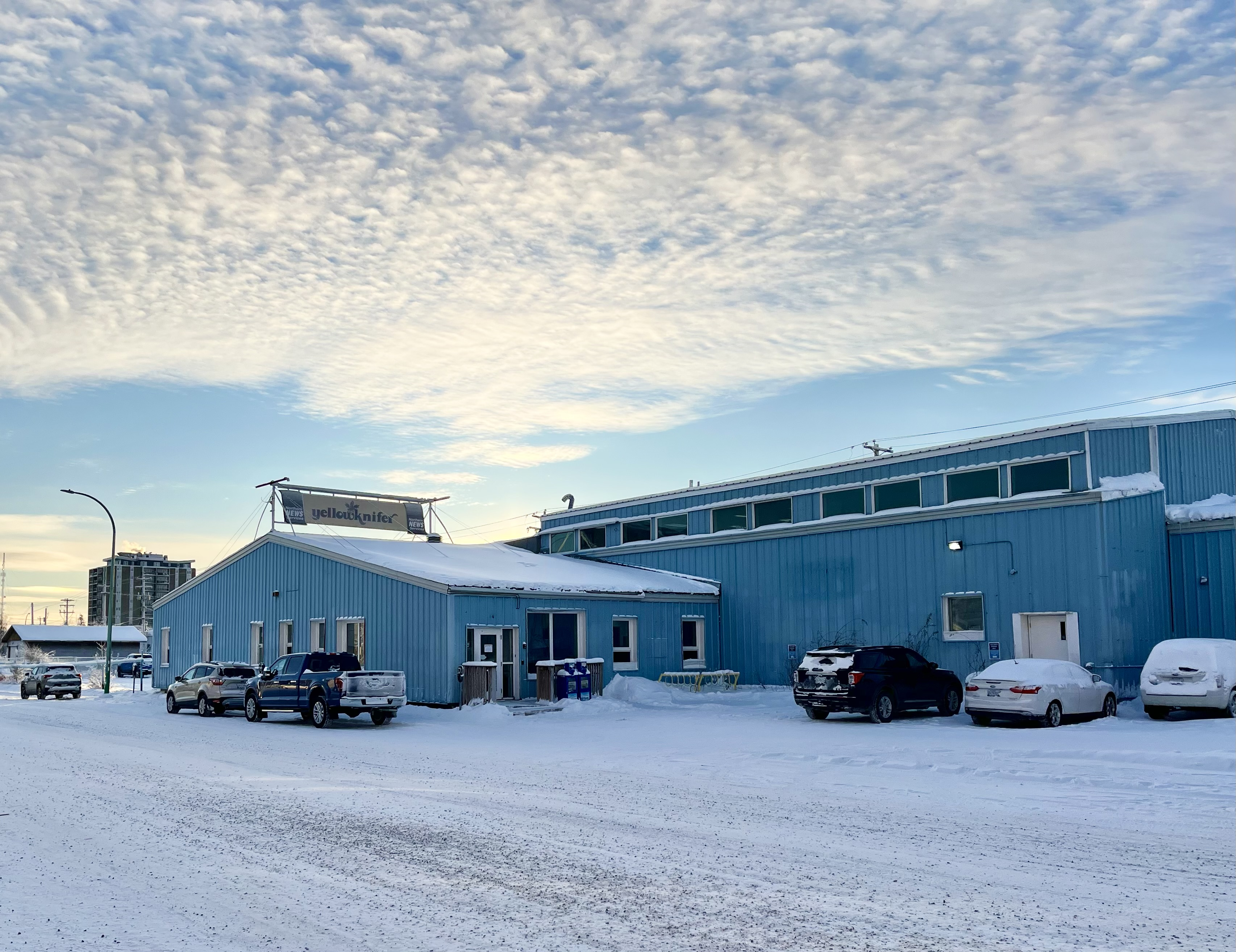
- Company type: Private
- Industry: Publishing
- Founded: Yellowknife, Northwest Territories (1972)
- Headquarters: Yellowknife, Northwest Territories, Canada
- Number of locations: 1 main office, 5 news bureaus: Inuvik, Hay River, Fort Simpson, Rankin Inlet, Iqaluit
- Area served: Northwest Territories, Nunavut
- Key people: J.W. (Sig) Sigvaldason (Founder); Bruce Valpy (Publisher)
- Products: Newspapers
- Owner: Black Press
- Number of employees: 60 (2007)
- Website: nnsl.com

NNSL Media (Northern News Services LTD) is a news and media company based in Yellowknife, Northwest Territories. It is one of the few remaining independent newspaper companies in Canada, producing all-original content with little to no reliance on syndicated news. NNSL publishes seven different papers weekly: Kivalliq News, Yellowknifer (Wednesday and Friday editions), News/North (Northwest Territories News/North and Nunavut News/North).

In March 2017, NNSL Media ceased publication of the weekly the Deh Cho Drum newspaper after 23 years.

In March 2021, Black Press, a Canadian publisher of over 170 newspapers in Canada and the United States, purchased NNSL. According to a report, NNSL had been on sale for over a year.

In January 2025, NNSL shuttered the Inuvik Drum. The newspaper was first published on Jan. 6, 1966 and had been owned by the company since 1988.
