= The Guardian (Charlottetown) =

Canadian newspaper in Prince Edward Island

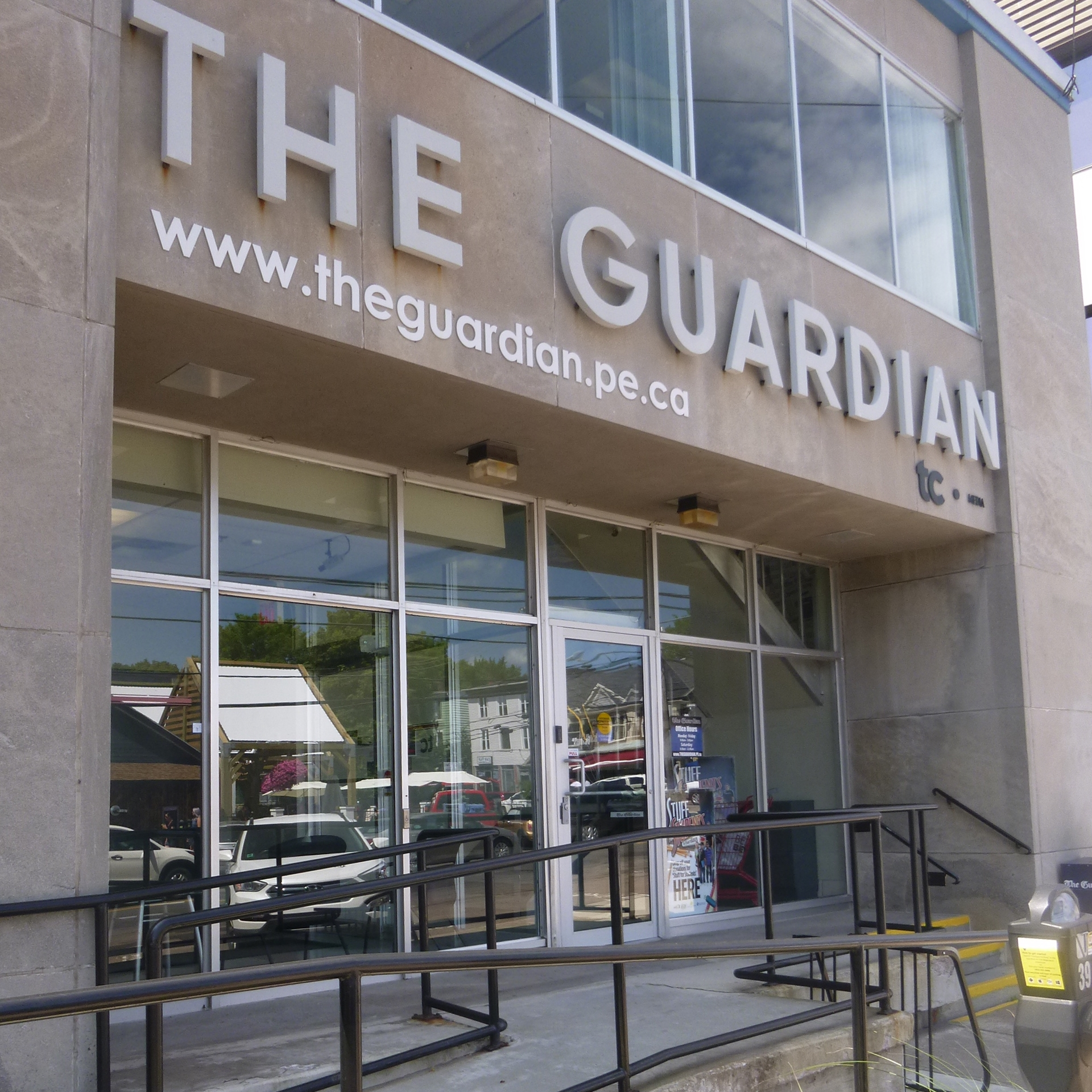
- Type: Daily newspaper
- Format: Broadsheet
- Owner: Postmedia Network
- Editor: Jocelyne Lloyd
- Founded: 1870s
- Headquarters: 165 Prince Street; Charlottetown, Prince Edward Island; C1A 4R7
- Website: www.saltwire.com/prince-edward-island/

The Guardian is a daily newspaper published five days a week in Charlottetown, Prince Edward Island, Canada.

== History ==
The paper was originally launched in the 1870s as The Presbyterian and Evangelical Protestant Union, owned by Presbyterian minister Stephen G. Lawson. It adopted its current name in 1887.

After a succession of local owners, the newspaper was bought by Thomson Corporation in the 1950s. Southam Newspapers acquired the paper from Thomson in 1996, before itself being acquired by Canwest Global Communications in 2000. Canwest sold the paper to Transcontinental in 2002, before being sold to SaltWire Network, a newly formed parent company of The Chronicle Herald, in April 2017.

The Guardian had a sister publication, The Evening Patriot, which was discontinued in 1995 amid efficiency changes by the publishers.

While the slogan of The Guardian for many years has been "Covers the Island like the dew", it remains principally a Charlottetown publication, with the Journal Pioneer in Summerside to the west and The Eastern Graphic in Montague to the east. In 2010, the daily weekday circulation was approximately 18,000.

The Guardian is currently printed in Halifax. The Guardian is a Tuesday to Saturday paper only. On July 26, 2024, Postmedia entered an agreement to purchase SaltWire.

== See also ==
- List of newspapers in Canada
