= Jeff Nippard =

Canadian YouTuber and bodybuilder (born 1990)

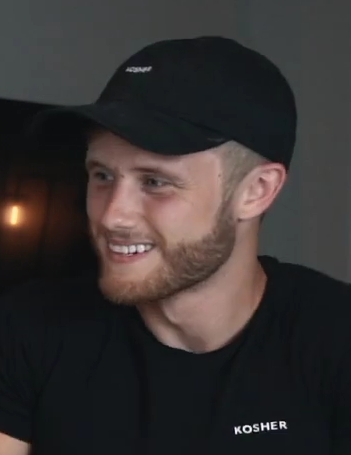
- Nippard in 2019

Personal information
- Born: Jeffrey William Chad Nippard; October 6, 1990 (age 36) Grand Falls-Windsor, Newfoundland and Labrador, Canada
- Education: Memorial University of Newfoundland (BSc)
- Years active: 2014–present
- Height: 165.1 cm (5 ft 5.0 in)
- Life partner: Stephanie Buttermore (died 2026)
- Website: jeffnippard.com

Sport
- Sport: Bodybuilding

Achievements and titles
- National finals: Mr. Junior Canada 2012 (1st place)

Jeff Nippard
- Years active: 2014–present

YouTube information
- Channel: Jeff Nippard
- Genre: Fitness
- Subscribers: 8.79 million
- Views: 2.13 billion
- Last updated: August 9, 2026

Jeffrey William Chad Nippard (born October 6, 1990) is a Canadian YouTuber and bodybuilder. He is one of the leading figures of the science-based lifting movement, which uses research to reduce injury and maximize results in opposition to pseudoscientific bodybuilding techniques, sometimes called "broscience".

== Early life ==
Jeffrey William Chad Nippard was born on October 6, 1990, in Grand Falls-Windsor, Newfoundland and Labrador. He graduated from the Memorial University of Newfoundland with a degree in biochemistry.

== Career ==
Nippard performed in his first bodybuilding show when he was nineteen. In 2012, he was awarded Mr. Junior Canada. Nippard created his YouTube channel in 2014. He had been consistently going to the gym since 2005, although, before discovering science-based lifting in 2014, he had been an adherent to the broscience movement. Nippard's early videos were based around his workouts, later shifting to presenting research in a digestible way.

In 2021, Nippard launched MacroFactor, a premium app that tracked nutrients. By this time, he had been selling training programs on his website. In October 2024, Nippard was involved in an altercation with bodybuilder Mike Van Wyck at a Burlington, Ontario, gym that resulted in Van Wyck being charged with two counts of assault after hitting Nippard and his cameraman. The confrontation was due to Van Wyck uploading a video titled "Science Based Scammers" and Nippard making video in response that refuted Van Wyck's claims.

In December 2024, Nippard published an instructional book, The Muscle Ladder: Get Jacked Using Science. In September 2025, Nippard revealed the Muscle Lab, a 4,000 sq ft (370 m^{2}), $3 million dollar research facility in Oakville, Ontario. He had been working on the project for two years with design studio Nivek Remas and planned to used it as a studio where he would also conduct experiments that would get peer reviewed and published in science journals.

== Personal life ==
In 2016, Nippard began dating fellow fitness influencer Stephanie Buttermore. Buttermore had a PhD in pathology and cell biology and researched ovarian cancer. They became engaged in October 2022. Buttermore died on March 6, 2026. After, Nippard struggled with depression and took time off social media.

== Bibliography ==
- Nippard, Jeff (December 31, 2024). The Muscle Ladder: Get Jacked Using Science. Victory Belt Publishing. ISBN 9781628604863.
