= Kivalliq News =

Canadian newspaper in Nunavut

- Type: Weekly newspaper
- Owner(s): Northern News Services
- Founded: 1994
- Circulation: 1,343 (as of October 2022)
- Website: nunavutnews.com/kivalliq-news

Kivalliq News is a Canadian weekly newspaper, published in Rankin Inlet, Nunavut by Northern News Services. The newspaper publishes content in both English and Inuktitut.
