= Norman R.C. Campbell =

Professor at University of Calgary, Canada

Norman R. C. Campbell
- Citizenship: Canadian
- Occupation: Professor Emeritus
- Awards: Order of Canada (2014)

Academic background
- Education: MD (1980), Memorial University of Newfoundland

Norman R. C. Campbell is a Canadian professor emeritus at the University of Calgary. He has held professorships in medicine, community health sciences, physiology, and pharmacology. In 2014, Campbell was appointed to the Order of Canada for his research and public health advocacy aimed at improving the well-being of Canadians.

== Career ==
Campbell received his medical degree from Memorial University of Newfoundland in 1978. He is an emeritus professor of medicine and holds a research chair at the University of Calgary, where his work focuses on hypertension prevention and control. Campbell has served as a consultant to the World Health Organization on nutrition and micronutrient issues, and has provided expert advice to the World Bank and the Pan American Health Organization's HEARTS in the Americas Initiative on hypertension control in countries including Cambodia, Mongolia, and Samoa. He has been affiliated with the O'Brien Institute for Public Health and the Libin Cardiovascular Institute of Alberta, and has been listed as a consultant for Resolve to Save Lives.

In the 2000s, Campbell served as a president of Blood Pressure Canada and the Canadian Hypertension Society. During his term, he contributed to the development of the Canadian Hypertension Recommendations – Control program, which issues annually updated, evidence-based recommendations and implementation strategies alongside a monitoring and evaluation process. The program has been associated with increasing hypertension control in Canada from 13% in the early 1990s to 68% in 2010.

He chaired the creation of the Pan-Canadian Framework for Hypertension Prevention and Control, under the auspices of Hypertension Canada through the unification of several national hypertension-focused organizations.
