= The Eastern Door =

Canadian newspaper in Quebec

- Type: Weekly newspaper
- Publisher: Steve Bonspiel
- Founded: 1992
- Website: easterndoor.com

The Eastern Door is a community-based weekly newspaper established by Kenneth Deer (Mohawk) in 1992 to serve the community of Kahnawake Mohawk Territory. This First Nations reserve of the Mohawks of Kahnawá:ke is located on the south shore of the St. Lawrence River in Quebec, Canada, across from Montreal. The weekly newspaper is published in English, and appears every Friday. It also has an online edition. Steve Bonspiel, who bought the paper in July 2008, is the editor and publisher.

In 2016 and 2017, the weekly won The Canadian Community Newspapers Association (CCNA) award in the General Excellence category for best small newspaper in Canada. It left the association after the organization restructured.

The newspaper also won best overall newspaper in the Quebec Community Newspapers Association in 2017 and 2018.
