= Alta Newspaper Group =

Canadian newspaper publisher

Alta Newspaper Group L.P.
- Company type: Private
- Industry: Newspapers and marketing
- Headquarters: Vancouver, British Columbia, Canada
- Area served: Western Canada and Quebec
- Key people: David Radler, founder
- Products: Three daily newspapers and several weekly newspapers
- Parent: Glacier Media (59%); David Radler (41%)
- Divisions: Southern Alberta Newspapers; TriCube Media

Alta Newspaper Group Limited Partnership is a Vancouver-based publisher of newspapers in Western Canada and Quebec. It owns three small daily newspapers and more than a dozen weeklies.

Alta, also known as Alberta Newspaper Group and Southern Alberta Newspapers, is one of two Canadian newspaper companies run and partially owned by David Radler, a former business partner of Conrad Black in Hollinger Inc. Both Alta and Continental Newspapers are descendants of Horizon Operations (Canada) Ltd., a company Radler founded at the end of the 1990s.

== History ==
Most of the newspapers that currently make up Alta and Continental were purchased from The Thomson Corporation between 1999 and 2001 by Horizon, a family of companies owned by David Radler and Conrad Black, independently from Radler's and Black's roles as COO and CEO, respectively, of Hollinger Inc. During the 2000s, both men were convicted of defrauding Hollinger and served time in prison; Black sold his interest in Horizon in 2006; and Radler organized his Canadian holdings into two companies, including a limited partnership for his two Alberta dailies and associated weeklies.

The chain, originally called Southern Alberta Newspapers and renamed Alta Group Newspapers, consisted of the former Thomson dailies Lethbridge Herald and Medicine Hat News, and a group of weeklies covering suburban and rural communities in the Lethbridge-Medicine Hat area. The oldest of the weeklies was The Taber Times, which dated to 1907 and had built the chain in the 1970s before being bought out by Hollinger and then Thomson.

In the mid-2000s, Alta purchased three weeklies in southwestern Saskatchewan, and in 2006 it acquired The Record of Sherbrooke, Quebec, from Glacier Media, which took an ownership interest in Alta. Radler noted that The Record was a nostalgic purchase: it was the first newspaper that he and Black owned, back in 1969.

The company has not made any major acquisitions since 2006, although it has bought out biweekly newspapers that competed with its dailies in Lethbridge and Sherbrooke.

== Ownership ==
As a private company, Alta Newspaper Group is not required to publish an annual report, and Radler has been "tight-lipped" about its ownership structure, telling reporters that he is "a shareholder" in the company but declining to specify how much he owns. Alta was formed, however, out of a subsidiary of Horizon Publications Inc., a company acknowledged to have been owned and operated primarily by Radler.

In 2006, as part of the deal that added The Record to Alta's holdings, Vancouver-based publisher Glacier Media took a 50% share in Alta. It later increased its ownership share to 59%. Glacier is also part-owner of two other newspaper companies connected with Radler, Continental Newspapers and RISN Operations. Sam Grippo, Glacier's chairman of the board, was a group publisher at Hollinger during Radler's time as chief operating officer.

== Properties ==
Although the company is headquartered in British Columbia, none of its properties are located there. Alta publishes newspapers in Alberta, Saskatchewan and Quebec. Its sister company Continental Newspapers publishes dailies in British Columbia and Ontario.

=== Alberta ===
Two dailies and six weekly newspapers in the Lethbridge-Medicine Hat area were part of the original Southern Alberta Newspapers chain owned by Horizon Operations. The Lethbridge Journal was added in 2011. Together, the following papers cover the cities of Lethbridge and Medicine Hat, the Municipal District of Taber, Cypress County, the County of Forty Mile No. 8 and Lethbridge County:

- Bow Island Commentator (Tuesdays)
- Lethbridge Herald (daily)
- Medicine Hat News (daily)
- Prairie Post (Fridays)
- The Sunny South News (Tuesdays)
- The Taber Times (Wednesdays)
- The Vauxhall Advance (Thursdays)
- The Western Canadian Pipeline (magazine)

=== Saskatchewan ===
Alta publishes four weeklies in southwestern Saskatchewan; all but the Prairie Post were added in 2006:

- Maple Creek News (Thursdays)
- Maple Creek Times (Tuesdays)
- The Shaunavon Standard (Tuesdays)
- Prairie Post East (Fridays)

=== Quebec ===
Alta acquired the smaller (of only two) English-language newspapers in Quebec, and its associated weekly product, in 2006. It added a competing semimonthly paper in 2009:

- Brome County News (weekly)
- The Record (Sherbrooke) (daily)
- The Townships Outlet (biweekly Tuesdays)

=== TriCube Media ===
Most of the websites associated with Alta and Continental properties are credited to TriCube Media, a division of Alta Newspaper Group based in Medicine Hat, Alberta. TriCube Media bills itself as "a full service branding and business development company". In addition to the newspapers, its clients include governments, nonprofits, blogs and private businesses. Services it provides include web design, web hosting graphic design, online advertising and promotions.

=== California ===
Alta through its subsidiaries have acquired a number of newspapers throughout California:

- Gold Mountain California News Media Inc. (2022) Auburn Journal, Big Bear Grizzly, Folsom Telegraph, Hi-Desert Star, (Lake Arrowhead) Mountain News, Lincoln News Messenger, Loomis News, Placer Herald, Roseville Press-Tribune, (Twentynine Palms) Desert Trail and Desert Mobile Home News.
- Gold Hill California Media Inc. (2021) Grass Valley Union
- Santa Maria California News Media Inc. (2020) Santa Maria Times, Hanford Sentinel Lompoc Record, Santa Ynez Valley News
- Sound News Media Inc. (2019) Bakersfield Californian, Tehachapi News
- Antelope Valley Press Inc. (2017) Antelope Valley Press
- Central Valley News-Sentinel Inc. (2015) Lodi News-Sentinel
- Imperial Valley News Media, Inc. (2015) Imperial Valley Press
- Vista California News Media, Inc. (2013) Marysville Appeal-Democrat, Tri-County Newspapers
- RISN Operations (2013) Porterville Recorder, (2019) Sonora Union Democrat.
- Horizon California Publications, Inc. (2000) Inyo Register, (2001) Mammoth Times
