= Lethbridge Herald =

Daily newspaper in Canada

- Type: Daily newspaper
- Owner(s): Alta Newspaper Group
- General manager: Ryan Turner
- News editor: Al Beeber
- Founded: 1905, as Lethbridge Weekly Herald
- Headquarters: 504 7th Street South; Lethbridge, Alberta; T1J 3Z7
- Circulation: 15,742 weekdays 15,444 Saturdays; 13,794 Sundays (as of 2011)
- Sister newspapers: Medicine Hat News
- ISSN: 0839-4938
- Website: lethbridgeherald.com

The Lethbridge Herald is the leading daily newspaper in greater Lethbridge, Alberta, Canada. It is owned by Alta Newspaper Group and also publishes and distributes a weekly newspaper, the Lethbridge Sun Times.

== Early history ==
On November 8, 1905, Fred E. Simpson and A.S. Bennett, both from Cranbrook, British Columbia, published the first issue of the Lethbridge Weekly Herald. The paper started in a building on what is now Fifth Street South.

Shortly after the launch of the Weekly Herald, William Ashbury Buchanan bought a half interest in the paper, and by the end of 1906 was its sole owner. Buchanan came from a newspaper career in Ontario and managed a staff of six and circulation of 300 within the first year. On 11 December 1907, he had introduced a daily paper titled the Lethbridge Daily Herald. The weekly continued as a separate paper until 1950.

Buchanan, like Bennett and Simpson before him, used the Herald to trumpet his belief in Lethbridge's potential as a commercial centre. In 1925, at the age of 49, he was named to the Senate of Canada, and remained both senator and publisher for the next 29 years, dividing his time between Ottawa and Lethbridge.

Through the 1930s, all employees at the Lethbridge Herald took a pay cut of equal percentage. One year, the profits of the Herald amounted to only $138. During the Second World War, 15 of the Herald employees left for military service.

In 1909, Buchanan had moved the paper to a location near Sixth Street and Third Avenue South. On 23 May 1952, Buchanan moved the Lethbridge Daily Herald to its current location on Seventh Street South, a location that had double the amount of floor space as the previous building.

Buchanan died in 1954, and his son, Hugh Buchanan, took over as owner of the paper.

== Modern history ==
Hugh Buchanan remained owner until he sold the paper in 1959 to F.P. Publications. In 1980, Thomson Newspapers bought F.P. Publications, and in September 2000, sold the Herald to Horizon Publications Inc.

Logo until 2008

During Thomson's ownership, the Herald was paired with the Medicine Hat News, the Taber Times chain of weeklies in nearby suburban and rural communities, and the Lethbridge Sun Times. When Horizon purchased these titles in 2000, they were called the Southern Alberta Newspapers; Horizon owner David Radler reorganized them as Alta Newspaper Group Limited Partnership in 2006, when Glacier Media took an ownership stake (now 59%) in them.

The Herald debuted its Sunday edition on 12 April 1992. In 1995, The Lethbridge Herald was the first Alberta newspaper to introduce an Internet edition. On 6 September 1996, it switched to full morning delivery.

In 2011, Alta Newspaper Group published the biweekly Lethbridge Journal.

As of 2015, the Lethbridge Herald prints 6 newspapers (Including its own daily newspaper), 5 of these are weekly papers including Prairie Post, the Sun Times and the Taber Times.

== See also ==
- List of newspapers in Canada
