= Medicine Hat News =

Canadian daily newspaper

- Type: Daily newspaper
- Owner(s): Alta Newspaper Group
- Publisher: Ryan McAdams
- Founded: 1885
- Headquarters: 922 Allowance SE; Medicine Hat, Alberta, Canada; T1A 3G7
- Circulation: 10,903 daily (as of 2011)
- ISSN: 0834-9584
- Website: medicinehatnews.com

The Medicine Hat News is a daily newspaper published in Medicine Hat, Alberta. It features a city news section, a national news section, a world news section, a sports section, a comics section, and a classifieds section.

The paper is owned by Alta Newspaper Group, which also owns the daily Lethbridge Herald and several weekly newspapers covering nearby rural communities. It has been published since 1885.

On Oct. 29, 1885, the first issue of the forerunner to the Medicine Hat News, the Times, was run off a tiny hand press. It's not conclusive, but a number of people are pretty sure that a boxcar embedded in a building at 525 North Railway St. is the site of the first building. Thanks to the entrepreneurial spirit of two Ontarions, teacher Thomas Braden and printer Andrew Armour, Medicine Hat was home to a newspaper, a community booster, a voice for southeastern Alberta and a publication that residents of the area still turn to 125 years later to find out what's happening in their backyard, their province, country and around the world.

Armour and Braden had ventured west from Ontario two years earlier, setting up a newspaper in Calgary, before looking east to Medicine Hat and the fledgling tent city that it was at that time.

In 1896, the then Medicine Hat Weekly News set up shop in a building adjacent to the former American Hotel on South Railway Street., and later moved to a two-storey building at the corner of Second and Sixth downtown in 1914. In 1958, operations moved into the adjacent Empress Theatre. In 1981, the News offices and printing plant moved to Dunmore Road, where it continues to operate today.

Until 1997, the News was an "afternoon" paper, but switched to a morning publication. The front page of the inaugural morning edition, on May 5, 1997, featured a story exposing unprecedented tampering by Bre-X Minerals at its gold mine in Indonesia. Two more ownership changes occurred since 2000. In 2002, the News was sold by Thomson to the Alberta Newspaper Group. In 2008, Glacier Media Inc. assumed a 50-per-cent interest in the paper.

In addition to its news coverage, Medicine Hat News also features opinion and editorial content, including letters to the editor and editorials written by the newspaper's staff. The newspaper also has a strong community focus and regularly highlights local events, community groups, and individual achievements.

== See also ==
- List of newspapers in Canada
