= Minden Times =

Canadian newspaper in Ontario

- Type: Weekly newspaper
- Format: Tabloid
- Owner(s): White Pine Media
- Editor: Thomas Smith
- Founded: January 30, 1963
- Language: English
- Headquarters: 2 IGA Road, Unit 2, Minden, Ontario, K0M 2K0
- Website: www.mindentimes.ca

The Minden Times is a tabloid newspaper published in Minden, centrally located in the heart of Ontario's cottage country. Published every Wednesday, it holds a mirror to the world of the Highway 35 corridor from Norland to Dorset. Its editorial focus is the village of Minden as well as the municipalities of Minden Hills and Algonquin Highlands. It is published alongside its sister publication, the Haliburton Echo.

Its current editor is Thomas Smith.

== History ==
The Minden Times was first called the Minden Progress. The inaugural edition was published Wednesday, January 30, 1963 with the headline "It's carnival time!" The editorial by Editor Alan R. Capon said, that the newspaper's partners "felt that the County Town of the Haliburton Highlands needed such a publication as a voice and a forum for comment.... We don't intend to remain the same, issue after issue. Thirty years from now the current cars will look just as old fashioned as the high-behinds the Keystone Cops used – little by little they adapt to the pressures of a changing world. We'll change too as the need arises because we feel that when you're through changing, you're through."

Not much is known about the paper's early years. In 1979, Jack Brezina left his job as the editor of the Cochrane Northland Post to buy the newspaper, which was now called the Minden Times. He became much beloved by the people he wrote about and soon was part of all aspects of community life. He served on various health boards and theatre groups, acting as emcee for numerous events. One of his strongest memories is of the paper led the campaign against was he calls "the skinhead invasion" in Minden 1989. The gathering at a rural property north of the village garnered national attention and the Minden Times made sure everyone knew the community did not tolerate the views espoused by the skinheads and neo-Nazis.

In November 2001, Brezina sold the Times to Len Pizzey, who had arrived in the Highlands at approximately the same time to work at the competing newspaper, The Haliburton County Echo, 24 kilometers away. Pizzey had bought the Echo in the mid-1980s and when he bought the Times in 2001, merged the two staffs, while keeping separate offices and identities for the papers. Pizzey sold the Times and the Echo to Osprey Media Group in August 2004 and stayed on as group publisher until his own retirement in November 2005. David Zilstra was appointed general manager of the two papers, as well as Bancroft This Week and Barry's Bay This Week. In January 2010, Zilstra moved on to Barrie taking the helm of the Barrie Examiner, being replaced by John Bauman as general manager.

After a brief and ill-fated merger with a local competitor under the name Maple Key Media in early 2014, the Times and its sister paper, the Haliburton County Echo, became part of White Pine Media, a subsidiary of London Publishing. Zilstra returned as publisher of the papers in 2014.

== See also ==
- List of newspapers in Canada
