= Haliburton Echo =

Canadian newspaper in Ontario

Haliburton County Echo
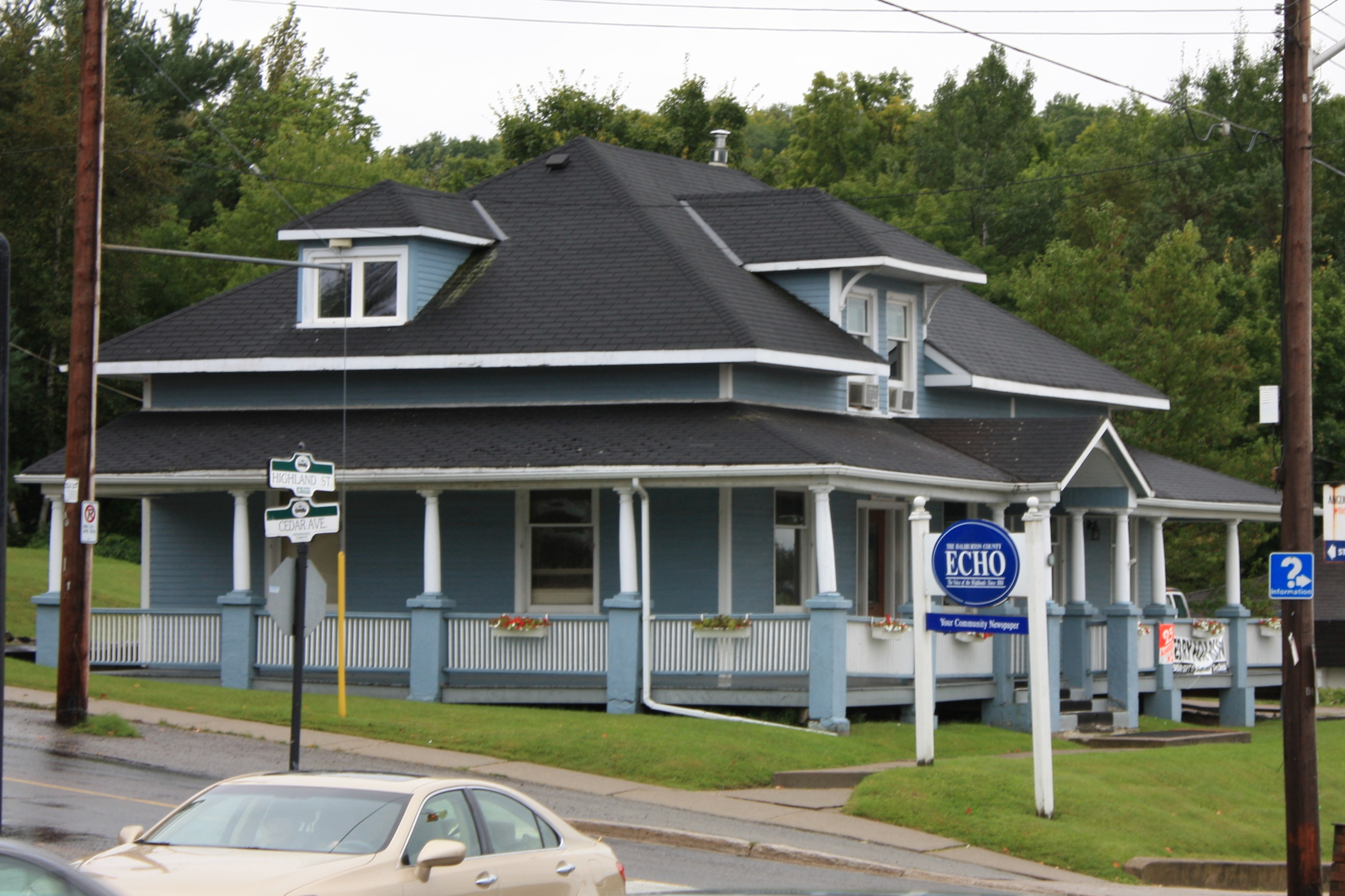
- Type: Weekly newspaper
- Format: Tabloid
- Owner(s): White Pine Media
- Editor: Emily Stonehouse
- Founded: 1884
- Language: English
- Headquarters: Box 360, Haliburton, Ontario, K0M 1S0
- Website: haliburtonecho.ca

The Haliburton County Echo is a weekly newspaper in the heart of Ontario’s cottage country. Established in 1884, it is published every Tuesday from its home base in the village of Haliburton. With its focus on news features, profiles and photography, it has won dozens of awards from the national and provincial newspaper associations.

== History ==
The early history of the Echo was compiled by Steve Hill of the Haliburton Highlands Museum. In his book "History of the Provisional County of Haliburton", printed circa 1931, former Echo owner R. H. Baker states that "On August 21, 1884, the first copy of the Minden Echo was printed by Brown and Small..." Not only did the Echo keep the residents abreast of local happenings through their weekly journal, but they filled private, commercial, and municipal requests for cards, stationery, notices, posters, etcetera, even township voters' lists.

Next on the scene appears to have been John Henry Delamere (1836–1916). The Minden Echo of July 19, 1889 lists him as the publisher and proprietor. On July 28, 1890, part of the Anson side of Main Street Minden was destroyed by fire. Examination of the Minden Echo of May 1, 1891 indicates that by the time the paper had doubled to eight pages, and that the word "County" had been deleted from its title. It now read as "The Minden Echo and Haliburton Recorder". Mr. Delamere operated the Echo until around 1906.

Richard Henry "R.H." Baker (1859–1935) owned the Minden Echo from circa 1907 to 1923. In 1910, Baker purchased the property on the Minden side of Main Street. It was from premises on this site that the Minden Echo newspaper was published until destroyed in the Minden fire of 1942.

Early in World War I Wilmur Louis "Mac" Macarthur came to Minden to teach school. With some previous printing experience, he worked for R.H. Baker at the Echo as a side-line.

In 1916 he married a Minden girl, Louisa Mae Welch. A deed of land dated March 1, 1923 indicates that on that day Macarthur purchased the Minden Echo property from Baker for $1,000, the sale presumably including the business itself. Electricity came to Minden late in 1935 with the opening of the Orillia Water Light & Power Commission plant on the Gull River, and by 1937 or '38, the Echo office had been wired for electricity. At that point, the press was converted to electrical power.

Tragedy struck Minden in the early morning hours of May 15, 1942 when the village's worst conflagration since 1890 swept the Minden side of Main Street, destroying virtually everything, including the Echo building. Macarthur died in 1945 at the young age of 55.

Mae Macarthur carried on in the printing business after her husband's death. She was no stranger to the business, and ran the shop more or less single-handedly afterwards. When her son Jack decided by 1950 that the printing profession was not the one he wished to pursue, she decided not to hold onto it anymore, and the Minden Echo printing shop was sold. On April 1, 1950, Clifford Booth of Minden, a printer, purchased the business. Then on July 25, 1950, he sold it to a partnership consisting of Mrs. Loyola Webster and Timothy Rogers. On June 16, 1951, Mrs. Webster bought out Rogers and became sole owner.

Under Mrs. Webster the Minden Echo newspaper was revived. Mrs. Webster had the Minden Echo until November 1, 1951, when she sold out to the partnership consisting of Walter Noice, Berkeley Feir, and his son Creighton. Feir and Noice changed the name of the Minden Echo newspaper to the Haliburton County Echo, and put out their first issue on November 8, 1951. The Haliburton County Echo moved to new quarters in Haliburton Village early in 1952.

The last Echo printed in Minden was the issue of December 20, 1951. The next Echo was that of January 10, 1952, which was the first time that a newspaper had ever been printed in Haliburton Village. Sometime in the 1950s, Feirs bought out Noice.

Mr. Feir Sr. was forced to resign for health reasons in the early 1970s, and Mrs. Feir died in 1973. Late in 1973, Creighton Feir sold the Haliburton County Echo to John Zylstra.

In 1976, the Echo set up a sister paper in Minden known as the Minden Recorder. Its inaugural edition was July 28, 1976, and it ran until August 17, 1977, when it was merged with the Haliburton County Echo to form a single paper, the Haliburton County Echo and Minden Recorder.

The Echo moved in 1976 from its long-time quarters in Berkeley Feir's former pool room to new facilities below the Canadian Imperial Bank of Commerce.

Zylstra sold the paper to a group of local businessmen consisting of Creighton Feir, Vince Connaughan, Peter Curry, Don Popple, Dave Gray, Gerry Dawson, and Ken Wilson. In 1985, Len Pizzey, an Echo staff member since 1978, bought the Echo. The Minden Recorder portion of the paper's title was dropped in 1991.

In 1993, the Echo's Creighton Feir died. With more than 40 years to his credit, he was the longest serving staff member in the history of the Echo, a man whose career spanned both the letterpress and offset eras. In 1985, Pizzey hired a young reporter named Martha Perkins. Three years later he decided to concentrate more on the business side of the newspaper and named Perkins as editor, a position she has held until the present day.

Over the years the Echo's list of publications grew: Summer Guide, Winter Guide, Fall Tour, Home and Cottage Services Directory, all published once a year; County Life (now called Cottage Times) published weekly in the four summer months; the now defunct Senior Life (later called Go.); and the Minden Times newspaper by association.

In 1996, Pizzey purchased the former Laking House overlooking Head Lake Park on Haliburton's main street and transformed it into the Echo's new home. In November 2001 he bought the Minden Times from long-time owner Jack Brezina, who retired from the newspaper business. Perkins became editor of both papers, which share staff.

In August 2004, Pizzey sold both the Echo and the Times to Osprey Media Group, staying on as group publisher for the Echo, Times, Barry's Bay This Week and Bancroft This Week. In November 2005, Pizzey decided to retire and David Zilstra, formerly of the Napanee Guide, took over as the four papers’ general manager.

In November 2009, Perkins left the position of editor to take over the Bowen Island Undercurrent in British Columbia, appointing reporter Jenn Watt as the managing editor of the four papers. In January 2010, John Bauman became the general manager, replacing Zilstra, who took the top spot at the Barrie Examiner.

In December 2013, it was announced that Sun Media was selling the Echo, along with sister publications the Minden Times and Bancroft This Week, in a deal that included a merger with a local competitor. That merger proved ill-fated, falling apart in a month, and the Echo along with the Times and Bancroft This Week became property of White Pine Media. Zilstra was brought back as general manager in February 2014. Darren Lum served as editor from November 2021 to October 2022. Vivian Collins, an established reporter for the Echo became the editor in 2023. After Collin's departure in 2024, Thomas Smith briefly served as Editor before Emily Stonehouse returned from a leave of absence.

== See also ==
- List of newspapers in Canada
