= List of newspapers in California =

As of 2026, there have been over 1,400 newspapers published in California. Active daily, non-daily, and student newspapers are listed first, followed by defunct newspapers.

== Daily newspapers ==
Name	City	Owner	Niche
The Orange County Register	Anaheim	Digital First Media	
Bakersfield Californian	Bakersfield	Alta Newspaper Group	
Chico Enterprise-Record	Chico	Digital First Media	
Imperial Valley Press	El Centro	Alta Newspaper Group	
Times-Standard	Eureka	Digital First Media	
Daily Republic	Fairfield	McNaughton Newspapers	
The Fresno Bee	Fresno	McClatchy	
The Union	Grass Valley	Alta Newspaper Group	
Lodi News-Sentinel	Lodi	Alta Newspaper Group	
Long Beach Press-Telegram	Long Beach	Digital First Media	
Asbarez	Los Angeles	Armenian Revolutionary Federation	Armenian-language
Investor's Business Daily	Los Angeles	Dow Jones & Company	
La Opinión	Los Angeles	ImpreMedia	Spanish-language
Los Angeles Times	Los Angeles	Patrick Soon-Shiong	
Manteca Bulletin	Manteca	209 Multimedia	
Appeal-Democrat	Marysville	Alta Newspaper Group	
Merced Sun-Star	Merced	McClatchy	
The Modesto Bee	Modesto	McClatchy	
San Gabriel Valley Tribune	Monrovia	Digital First Media	
The Monterey County Herald	Monterey	Digital First Media	
Napa Valley Register	Napa	Hoffmann Media Group	
Marin Independent Journal	Novato	Digital First Media	
The Desert Sun	Palm Springs	USA Today Co.	
Palo Alto Daily Post	Palo Alto	Dave Price and Jim Pavelich	
Pasadena Star-News	Pasadena	Digital First Media	
The Porterville Recorder	Porterville	RISN Operations	
Inland Valley Daily Bulletin	Rancho Cucamonga	Digital First Media	
Daily News	Red Bluff	Digital First Media	
Redding Record Searchlight	Redding	USA Today Co.	
Redlands Daily Facts	Redlands	Digital First Media	
The Daily Independent	Ridgecrest	Mountain and Desert Media	
The Press-Enterprise	Riverside	Digital First Media	
The Sacramento Bee	Sacramento	McClatchy	
The Salinas Californian	Salinas	USA Today Co.	
The San Bernardino Sun	San Bernardino	Digital First Media	
The San Diego Union-Tribune	San Diego	Digital First Media	
San Francisco Chronicle	San Francisco	Hearst Corporation	
San Francisco Examiner	San Francisco	Clint Reilly Communications	
The Mercury News	San Jose	Digital First Media	
The Tribune	San Luis Obispo	McClatchy	
San Mateo County Times	San Mateo	Digital First Media	
San Mateo Daily Journal	San Mateo	Bigfoot Media	
Voice of OC	Santa Ana		
Santa Clarita Valley Signal	Santa Clarita	Paladin Multimedia Group	
Santa Cruz Sentinel	Santa Cruz	Digital First Media	
Santa Maria Times	Santa Maria	Alta Newspaper Group	
Santa Monica Daily Press	Santa Monica	Newlon Rouge, Inc	
The Press Democrat	Santa Rosa	Digital First Media	
The Record	Stockton	USA Today Co.	
The Daily Breeze	Torrance	Digital First Media	
Ventura County Star	Ventura	USA Today Co.	
Daily Press	Victorville	USA Today Co.	
Visalia Times-Delta	Visalia	USA Today Co.	
East Bay Times	Walnut Creek	Digital First Media	
Whittier Daily News	Whittier	Digital First Media	
The Mendocino Voice	Willits		
The Daily Democrat	Woodland	Digital First Media	
Los Angeles Daily News	Woodland Hills	Digital First Media	
Siskiyou Daily News	Yreka	USA Today Co.	

== Non-daily newspapers ==
Name	City	Owner	Frequency	Niche
The Modoc County Record	Alturas		Weekly	
Atascadero News	Atascadero	News Media Corporation	Weekly	
Auburn Journal	Auburn	Alta Newspaper Group	Twice weekly	
Catalina Islander	Avalon		Weekly	Catalina Island
Berkeley Daily Planet	Berkeley		Weekly	
Inyo Register	Bishop	Alta Newspaper Group	Weekly	
Anderson Valley Advertiser	Boonville			
Brentwood Press	Brentwood	Greg Robinson and Sandie McNulty	Weekly	Hyperlocal (East Contra Costa County)
Hellenic Journal	Brisbane		Monthly	
Burbank Leader	Burbank	Outlook Newspapers Group	Weekly	
Mojave Desert News	California City		Weekly	
Carmel Pine Cone	Carmel-by-the-Sea	Paul Miller	Weekly	
Chino Valley Champion	Chino	Champion Newspapers	Weekly	
The Star-News	Chula Vista		Weekly	
Claremont Courier	Claremont		Weekly	
Del Norte Triplicate	Crescent City	Country Media, Inc.	Weekly	
The Davis Enterprise	Davis	McNaughton Newspapers	Twice-weekly	
The Mountain Messenger	Downieville		Weekly	Sierra County news
Elk Grove Citizen	Elk Grove	Messenger Publishing Group	Weekly	
East Bay Express	Emeryville		Weekly	
The Coast News	Encinitas	Coast News Group	Weekly	
Times-Advocate	Escondido		Weekly	
Evergreen Times	Evergreen	Times Media, Inc.	Weekly	
The Sun-Gazette	Exeter	Mineral King Publishing, Inc.	Weekly	Tulare County news since 1901
The Folsom Telegraph	Folsom		Weekly	
Fontana Herald News	Fontana	Times Media Group	Weekly	
Fullerton Observer	Fullerton	Fullerton Observer, LLC	Bimonthly	Orange County, California news
North County News Tribune	Fullerton	Digital First Media	Weekly	
The Galt Herald	Galt	Messenger Publishing Group	Weekly	
Gardena Valley News	Gardena		Weekly	
Glendale News-Press	Glendale	Outlook Newspapers Group	Weekly	
Salinas Valley Tribune	Gonzales	New SV Media Inc.	Weekly	
Gridley Herald	Gridley	Messenger Publishing Group	Weekly	
Independent Coast Observer	Gualala		Weekly	
Gustine Press-Standard	Gustine	209 Multimedia	Weekly	
Half Moon Bay Review	Half Moon Bay	Coastside News Group	Weekly	
Hanford Sentinel	Hanford	Santa Maria California News Media Inc.	Weekly	
The Healdsburg Tribune	Healdsburg	Weeklys	Weekly	
The Hemet San Jacinto Chronicle	Hemet and San Jacinto	PCM Publishing	Weekly	Hemet and San Jacinto local/community news
Hollister Free Lance	Hollister	Weeklys	Weekly	
Huntington Beach Independent	Huntington Beach	Tribune Media	Weekly	
Idyllwild Town Crier	Idyllwild-Pine Cove	Idyllwild House Publishing Co. Ltd.	Weekly	
Amador Ledger-Dispatch	Jackson	Jackson Rancheria Band of Miwuk Indians	Weekly	
Crescenta Valley Weekly	La Crescenta	Crescenta Valley Publishing, LLC	Weekly	
Lincoln News Messenger	Lincoln	Alta Newspaper Group	Weekly	
Lompoc Record	Lompoc	Alta Newspaper Group	Weekly	
The Loomis News	Loomis	Alta Newspaper Group	Weekly	
Los Altos Town Crier	Los Altos		Weekly	
Los Angeles Sentinel	Los Angeles		Weekly	African-American
The Epoch Times	Los Angeles	Epoch Times Media Group	Weekly	News and lifestyle
Pacific Citizen	Los Angeles		Monthly	Asian-American
Armenian Observer	Los Angeles		Weekly	Armenian-American
Larchmont Chronicle	Los Angeles	John H. Welborne	Monthly	
Los Banos Enterprise	Los Banos	Michael Braa	Biweekly	
Los Cerritos Community News	La Mirada	Hews Media Group	Weekly	
The Madera Tribune	Madera		Biweekly	
Mammoth Times	Mammoth Lakes	Alta Newspaper Group	Weekly	
Mariposa Gazette	Mariposa		Weekly	
Mendocino Beacon	Mendocino	Digital First Media	Weekly	
The Almanac	Menlo Park	Embarcadero Media Foundation	Weekly	
Monterey County Weekly	Monterey	Milestone Communications	Weekly	
Mountain View Voice	Mountain View	Embarcadero Media Foundation	Weekly	
West Side Index	Newman	209 Multimedia	Weekly	
Novato Advance	Novato	Marinscope Community Newspapers	Weekly	
Oakdale Leader	Oakdale	209 Multimedia	Weekly	
Ojai Valley News	Ojai		Weekly	
Cedar Street	Pacific Grove		Weekly	
The Palisadian-Post	Pacific Palisades	Alan Smolinisky	Weekly	
Pacifica Tribune	Pacifica	Coastside News Group	Weekly	
Palo Alto Weekly	Palo Alto	Embarcadero Media Foundation	Weekly	First newspaper to put entire catalog online
Paso Robles Press	Paso Robles	News Media Corporation	Weekly	
Placerville Mountain Democrat	Placerville	McNaughton Newspapers	Weekly	
Pleasanton Weekly	Pleasanton	Embarcadero Media Foundation	Weekly	
Rancho Cordova Grapevine-Independent	Rancho Cordova	Messenger Publishing Group	Weekly	
Redwood City Pulse	Redwood City	Embarcadero Media Foundation	Weekly	
Mid Valley Times	Reedley	Mineral King Publishing, Inc.	Weekly	
The Placer Herald	Rocklin	Alta Newspaper Group	Weekly	
The Roseville Press Tribune	Roseville	Alta Newspaper Group	Weekly	
Sacramento Observer	Sacramento	Observer Media Group	Weekly	African-American
Humor Times	Sacramento		Monthly	Satire
El Sol de Salinas	Salinas		Biweekly	
Calaveras Enterprise	San Andreas	Hope Publications LLC	Weekly	
Indian Voices	San Diego	Black Rose Communications	Monthly	Native American
The Southern Cross	San Diego	Bishop of San Diego	Monthly	Religion (Catholicism)
San Fernando Valley Sun	San Fernando	Severyn Ashkenazy	Weekly	
Kstati	San Francisco	Kstati Publishing Company	Weekly	Russian-American
Alianza Metropolitan	San Jose	Rossana Drumond	Weekly	
Willow Glen Resident	San Jose	Digital First Media	Weekly	
India-West	San Leandro	India-West Publications	Weekly	Indo-American
San Lorenzo Valley Post	Santa Cruz Mountains	San Lorenzo Valley Post, LLC	Monthly	
Santa Clara Weekly	Santa Clara	Santa Clara Eagle Publishing	Weekly	
The Comic News	Santa Cruz		Monthly	Satire, Cartoons
Santa Cruz Mountain Bulletin	Santa Cruz Mountains	Wendy Sigmund / Mountain Publishing	Monthly	
Press Banner	Scotts Valley	Tank Town Media	Weekly	
Selma Enterprise	Selma	Santa Maria California News Media Inc.	Weekly	
Mountain Views News	Sierra Madre		Weekly	
Santa Ynez Valley News	Solvang	Alta Newspaper Group	Weekly	
Sonoma Valley Sun	Sonoma	Sonoma Valley Sun Newspaper	Weekly	
Tahoe Daily Tribune	South Lake Tahoe	Swift Communications	Weekly	
The Ark	Tiburon	AMMI Publishing Co. Inc.	Weekly	Hyperlocal (Tiburon, Belvedere, and Strawberry)
The Desert Review	Imperial Valley	Betty and Lloyd Miller	Weekly	
The Tolucan Times	Toluca Lake		Monthly	
Tracy Press	Tracy	Tank Town Media	Weekly	
Sierra Sun	Truckee	Swift Communications	Weekly	
Turlock Journal	Turlock	209 Multimedia	Weekly	
Ukiah Daily Journal	Ukiah	Digital First Media	Weekly	
Valley Roadrunner	Valley Center		Weekly	
Trinity Journal	Weaverville		Weekly	
The Willits News	Willits	Digital First Media	Biweekly	
Winters Express	Winters	McNaughton Newspapers	Weekly	
Hi-Desert Star	Yucca Valley		Weekly	

== Student newspapers ==
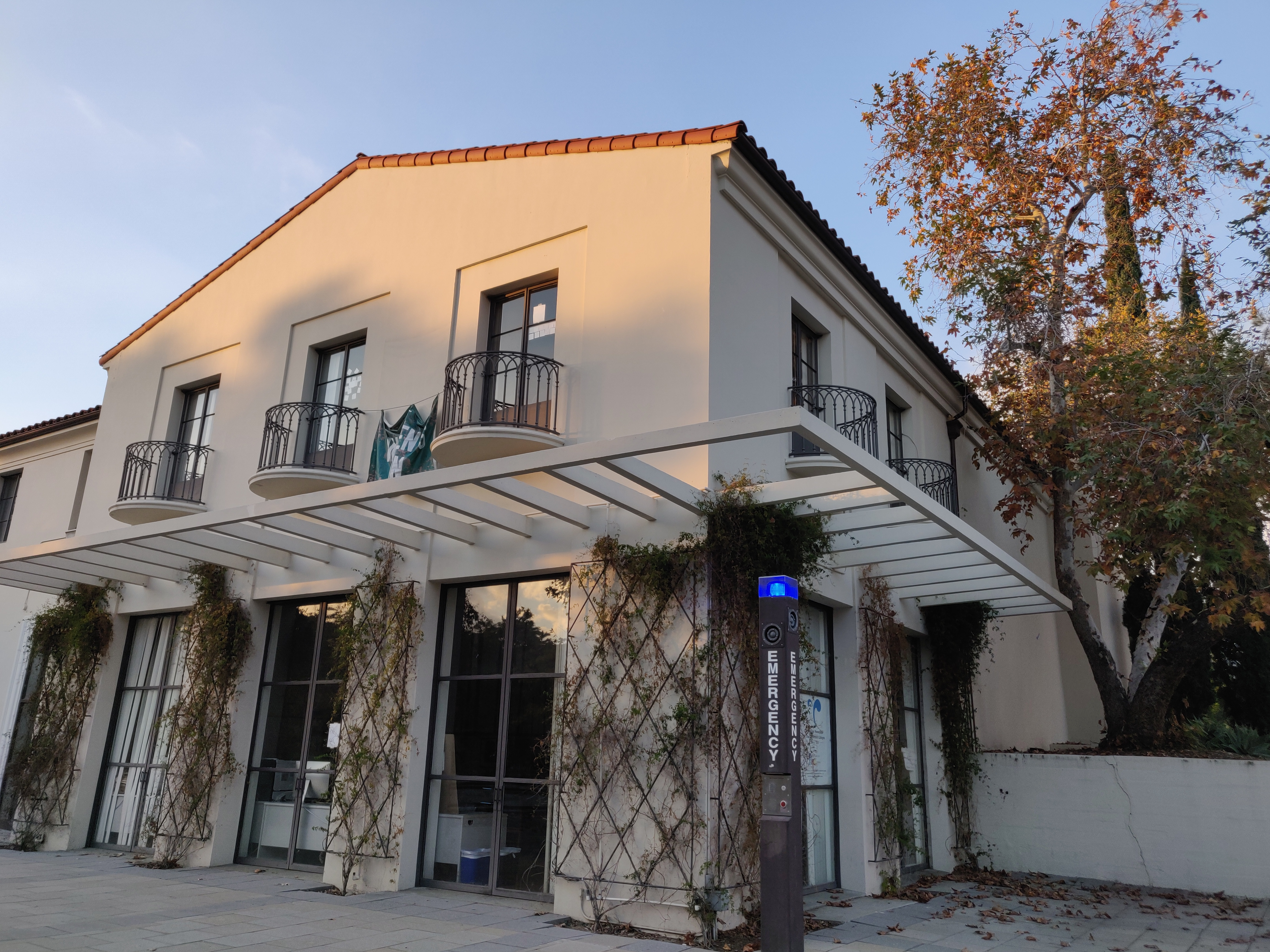
Office of The Student Life, the Claremont Colleges' newspaper

- Azusa Pacific University – The Clause
- Bakersfield College – The Renegade Rip
- Biola University – The Chimes
- Cabrillo College – The Voice
- California Baptist University – The Banner
- California Institute of Technology – The California Tech
- California Polytechnic State University, San Luis Obispo – Mustang News
- California State Polytechnic University, Humboldt – The Lumberjack
- California State Polytechnic University, Pomona – The Poly Post, The Pomona Point
- California State University, Chico – The Orion
- California State University, East Bay – The Pioneer
- California State University, Dominguez Hills – The Bulletin
- California State University, Fresno – The Daily Collegian
- California State University, Fullerton – The Daily Titan
- California State University, Long Beach – 22 West Magazine, Daily Forty-Niner and DIG magazine
- California State University, Los Angeles – University Times
- California State University, Monterey Bay – The Lutrinae
- California State University, Northridge – The Daily Sundial
- California State University, Sacramento – The State Hornet
- California State University, San Bernardino – Coyote Chronicle
- California State University, San Marcos – Cougar Chronicle
- Cerritos College – Talon Marks
- Chapman University – The Panther
- City College of San Francisco – Guardsman
- Claremont Colleges – The Student Life
- Claremont McKenna College – The Forum
- College of the Desert – The Chaparral
- College of Marin – Echo Times
- Concordia University, Irvine – Hilltop Herald
- Contra Costa College – The Advocate
- Cuesta College – The Cuestonian
- The Culinary Institute of America (Greystone campus) – Sage Thymes
- De Anza College – La Voz
- Diablo Valley College – The Inquirer
- Foothill College – The Sentinel
- Fullerton College – The Hornet
- Glendale College – El Vaquero
- Laney College – The Citizen
- Life Chiropractic College West – Lifelines
- Long Beach City College – The Viking Online
- Los Angeles Valley College – The Valley Star
- Los Medanos College – Experience
- Loyola Marymount University – The Los Angeles Loyolan
- Occidental College – The Occidental
- Ohlone College — "The Ohlone Monitor″
- Pasadena City College – Courier
- San Diego State University – The Daily Aztec
- San Francisco State University – The Golden Gate [X]press
- San José State University – The Spartan Daily
- Santa Ana College – el Don
- Santa Clara University – The Santa Clara
- Santa Monica College – The Corsair
- Scripps College – The Scripps Voice
- Sonoma State University – The Sonoma State STAR
- Stanford University – The Stanford Daily, The Stanford Review
- University of California, Berkeley – The Daily Californian,The Free Peach
- University of California, Davis – The California Aggie
- University of California, Irvine – New University
- University of California, Los Angeles – Daily Bruin
- University of California, Merced – The Prodigy
- University of California, Riverside – The Highlander
- University of California, San Diego – The UCSD Guardian
- University of California, Santa Barbara – Daily Nexus, The Bottom Line
- University of California, Santa Cruz – City on a Hill Press
- University of San Diego – The USD Vista, California Review
- University of San Diego School of Law – Motions
- University of San Francisco – San Francisco Foghorn
- University of Southern California – Daily Trojan
- Whittier College – The Quaker Campus

== Defunct newspapers ==
- Alameda Times-Star
- Anaheim Bulletin
- The Argus (Fremont)
- Beverly Hills Post
- California Eagle (Los Angeles)
- The Californian (San Francisco)
- Chung Sai Yat Po (San Francisco, Chinese)
- Clovis Independent
- Contra Costa Times (Contra Costa County)
- La Crónica (Los Angeles, Spanish, 1872–1892)
- Hayward Daily Review
- The Daily Alta California
- Daily Star-Progress (La Habra)
- Delano Record
- Desert Dispatch
- Dinuba Sentinel
- Dixon Tribune
- The Elevator
- Evening Outlook (Santa Monica)
- Fillmore Herald
- The Golden Era (San Francisco)
- Hayward Journal
- Hemet News
- Highland Citrus Belt (1892–1902)
- Hispano América (San Francisco, Spanish, 1917–1934)
- Hokubei Mainichi Newspaper (San Francisco, Japanese)
- Hollywood Citizen-News
- Hollywood Star
- The Home Alliance
- Inglewood Daily News
- Los Angeles Illustrated Daily News
- Los Angeles Examiner (1903–1962)
- Los Angeles Herald-Examiner (1962–1989)
- Los Angeles Herald Express (1931–1962)
- Los Angeles Mirror
- Los Angeles Record
- Los Angeles Saturday Night (1920–1934, illustrated weekly by Samuel Travers Clover)
- Los Angeles Star / La Estrella de Los Ángeles (Bilingual English/Spanish, 1851–1879)
- Martinez News-Gazette
- Napa Sentinel
- The Nevada Journal (Nevada City)
- Nichi Bei Times (San Francisco, Japanese)
- North County Times (Escondido)
- Oakland Tribune
- Oceanside Blade-Tribune
- OC Weekly
- Oxnard Press-Courier
- The Pacific Ensign
- Parlier Post
- Peninsula Times Tribune
- Progress Bulletin (Pomona)
- Sacramento Union (1851–1994)
- Santa Barbara News-Press (1868–2023)
- San Bruno Herald
- San Diego Daily Journal (1944–1950)
- The San Diego Sun (1908–1939)
- San Francisco Bay Guardian
- San Francisco Call (1856–1913)
- San Francisco Evening Bulletin (1929–1959)
- San Francisco Frontiers (1994–2002)
- The San Francisco News (1903–1959)
- San Mateo County Times
- San Mateo Daily News
- Sanger Herald
- Sausalito News
- La Sociedad (San Francisco, Spanish, 1869–1895)
- The Tustin News
- Times-Press-Recorder (Arroyo Grande, 1969–2003)
- Upland News
- Viet Mercury (San Jose, Vietnamese)
- La Voz de Méjico (San Francisco, Spanish, 1862–1866)
- WAR (newspaper)
- The Western Outlook

== See also ==
- List of African-American newspapers in California

Comprehensive

- Lists of newspapers
- List of newspapers in the United States

Frequency

- List of free daily newspapers in the United States
- List of weekly newspapers in the United States

Circulation

- List of international newspapers originating in the United States
- List of national newspapers in the United States
- List of newspapers in the United States by circulation

Foreign language

- List of French-language newspapers published in the United States
- List of German-language newspapers published in the United States
- List of Spanish-language newspapers published in the United States

Specialty

- List of African-American newspapers in the United States
- List of alternative weekly newspapers in the United States
- List of business newspapers in the United States
- List of family-owned newspapers in the United States
- List of Jewish newspapers in the United States
- List of LGBTQ periodicals in the United States
- List of student newspapers in the United States
- List of supermarket tabloids in the United States
- List of underground press in the United States

Other

- List of defunct newspapers of the United States
