= Pleasanton Weekly =

- Late 2006 and early 2007 editions of the Pleasanton Weekly
- Type: Alternative weekly
- Owner: Embarcadero Media
- Publisher: Gina Channell
- President: Gina Channell
- Editor: Jeremy Walsh
- Founded: 2000
- Language: English
- Headquarters: 5506 Sunol Boulevard, Suite 203, Pleasanton, California
- City: Pleasanton, California
- Country: United States
- Circulation: 9,500 print; 180,000 digital; (as of 2020)
- Sister newspapers: Palo Alto Weekly, The Almanac, Mountain View Voice
- Website: www.pleasantonweekly.com

The Pleasanton Weekly is a weekly newspaper published in Pleasanton, California, established in 2000. Owned by Embarcadero Media, the newspaper serves Pleasanton, California.

Gina Channell was named the division president and Pleasanton Weekly publisher in 2006. In 2017, Jeremy Walsh took over as the paper's editor from the founding editor Jeb Bing. The newspaper also maintains an online version on its website. The Pleasanton Weekly is distributed free to all households every Friday, as well as via businesses and street newsstands.

As of 2020, the print circulation is 9,500 and the digital reach is 180,000 monthly total visits. 90% of the paper's revenue comes from the print edition.

== Awards and recognition ==
The newspaper has won multiple first-place awards from the California Newspaper Publishers Association. Awards include first-place Coverage of Local Government from the 2018 California Journalism Awards Digital Contest and first-place Editorial Comment from the 2019 California Journalism Awards Print Contest.
