= Winters Express =

Weekly newspaper published in Winters, California

- "Gateway To The Monticello Dam"
- Type: Weekly newspaper
- Owner(s): McNaughton Newspapers; Wallace family
- Founder: Edwin C. Rust
- Publisher: Taylor Buley
- Editor-in-chief: Crystal Apilado
- Founded: 1884
- Language: English
- Headquarters: 13 Russell St, Winters, CA 95694
- Website: wintersexpress.com

The Winters Express is a weekly newspaper published in Winters, California.

== History ==
On February 1, 1884, Edwin C. Rust founded the Winters Express. Edwin was son of Col. Richard Rust, who had founded the California Express in Marysville three decades earlier. In July 1896, Frank H. Owen acquired the paper after Rust left to go publish the Amador Dispatch. In March 1908, Fred C. Hemenway bought the Express from Owen.

In August 1925, Hemenway leased for one year to Frank W. Tilney and C.F. Hager so he could devote his time to farming. That December, Tilney exited the business. Hemenway resumed control after a year. In total, Hemenway owned the paper for nearly three decades. The paper was hen acquired by Walter W. Stark in December 1944, Fred W. Smith, former publisher of the Woodland Record, in November 1945, and Newton "Newt" Wallace, formerly of the Upland News, in January 1947

Wallace was considered by many to be the "Mark Twain of the California News Publishers Association" due to his "dry Midwest humor and savvy observations about his craft." He penned a column called "Here, There, and Everywhere." He was also a lifelong volunteer weather recorder for the National Weather Service. In 1962, he was part of a group of California publishers invited to have lunch at the White House with President John F. Kennedy.

In 1964, Wallace was elected president of the CNPA. In 1967, director Anthony Loeb with the United States Information Agency created a documentary film on Wallace and the Express. The goal of the project was to show the life of a newspaperman in a typically small U.S. city. Copies of the film were placed in USIA libraries in over 100 countries.

By 1980, the Express has a circulation of 1,658. That number grew to over 2,000 a few years later. In 1983, Charles R. "Charley" Wallace succeeded his father as publisher. In 1994, McNaughton Newspapers, owners of the Daily Republic of Fairfield, Placerville Mountain Democrat and The Davis Enterprise, became co-owners of the Express with the Wallace family.

In 2013, Newton Wallace claimed to have beaten the record for "the world’s oldest newspaper delivery person." The Guinness World Records had previously given the record to Ted Ingram of the Dorset Echo. Wallace's record was never made official, but it was reported on in The New York Times.

In 2015, Newton Wallace officially retired at age 96. At that time he called himself the “world’s oldest paper boy." He still spent a few hours a day at the paper despite retiring. In 2018, Charley Wallace retired as publisher and was succeeded by Taylor Buley. In 2018, Newton Wallace died. In 2023, Newton Wallace was inducted into the California Newspaper Hall of Fame.
