= Desert News =

Desert News may refer to:

- Mojave Desert News, a newspaper published in California City, California
- Deseret News, a newspaper published in Salt Lake City, Utah

== See also ==
- News desert
