= Printcasting =

Printcasting is a web site and self-publishing technology designed to let individuals and organizations create self-updating PDF magazines using content from participating blogs or news providers. It has been mentioned in Business Week and the Rocky Mountain News as an example of online experiments that can help newspapers during a time when print readership is declining.

Printcasting was founded by Dan Pacheco and is supported by an $837,000 grant to The Bakersfield Californian by the Knight Foundation through the Knight News Challenge. The focus of the project in its initial phases is hyper-local and interest-based, allowing micro-communities to publish magazines which can be printed and distributed by various methods. According to Business Week, the service begins with a pilot in Bakersfield, California.

In the fall of 2008, the World Association of Newspapers [WAN] listed Printcasting as one of five important audience-building strategies newspapers should consider.

== Project phases ==
Printcasting entered open beta testing in pilot city Bakersfield, California in February 2009. A public launch is planned for late March 2009, with additional city partnerships beginning in December 2009.
