= Internationally Acclaimed Fruitcake Festival =

Coordinates: 36°49′39″N 118°12′48″W

The Internationally Acclaimed Fruitcake Festival (also known as the Independence Fruitcake Festival) is an annual event that takes place at Independence, California , each December. The event centers around the seasonal fruitcake, and it has been described by the Ridgecrest Daily Independent as "a full-scale celebration of the holiday staple that is both tongue-in-cheek and very serious."

== History and features ==
The festival occurs at Independence (the seat of Inyo County), a small town of about 600 people that sits 250 miles northeast of Los Angeles. It was launched in 2005 by the Independence Civic Club, which still organizes the event. The Fruitcake Festival typically occurs at the Independence Legion Hall.

Each festival includes a unique theme, and attendees are encouraged to dress in the style of the theme. Past themes have included "Back to the Fruitcake" (referencing Back to the Future); "Peace, Love, and Fruitcake" (referencing 1960s hippie culture); "When You Wish Upon a Fruitcake" (referencing fairy tales); "Fruitcakes in Space"; and "Food of the Pharaohs" (referencing ancient Egypt).

Each festival typically includes music, a costume contest, and the "crowning of the Fruitcake King." At the center of each event is a fruitcake competition, which anyone is allowed to join. Judges give awards for several categories, including: "oldest, travelled the farthest, best of theme, most solids," judge's award, and people's choice. Admission for entry is typically a fruitcake, a carton of eggnog, or a small cash fee.

== Reception and media coverage ==
The IAFF has been covered by many notable news outlets, including NPR's Weekend Edition, PBS SoCal, The Washington Times, The Inyo Register, The Monterey County Herald, and Atlas Obscura's Gastro Obscura blog. The December 2007 issue of Country Living magazine proclaimed The Independence Fruitcake Festival as an event "not to miss."

The Internationally Acclaimed Fruitcake Festival was referenced in Inyo County's gold medal-winning display at the 2009 California State Fair; the display's theme was "Weird, Wild and Wacky"—with the Fruitcake Festival labelled as one of the county's "wacky" attractions.
