= William Arthur Chalfant =

American journalist and historian (1868–1943)

William Arthur Chalfant (10 January 1868 – 5 November 1943) was a newspaper publisher, author, and California historian. He co-founded the Inyo Register newspaper in 1885 and acted as its primary writer, editor, and publisher for over 50 years. Chalfant also wrote a number of books about California and American Western history.

Chalfant acted as a fierce advocate for the residents of Inyo County and was an outspoken opponent of the Los Angeles Aqueduct. Upon his death in 1943, the Los Angeles Times referred to him as "dean of western [newspaper] editors and historian of Eastern California and Death Valley."

== Biography ==
=== Early life ===
Chalfant, known as "Willie" (or alternatively, "Bill"), was born at the silver rush town of Virginia City, Nevada on 10 January 1868 to Pleasant Arthur Chalfant (1831–1901) and Adaline Slater Chalfant (1841–1915).

In 1870, Pleasant co-founded the Inyo Independent based in Independence, which was the county's first regularly published newspaper. At age 8, Willie "first learned to set type and operate a tiny" printing press gifted to him by his father. During his childhood he used this small press to informally print several publications, including the Juvenile Weekly and The Owens Valley Newsletter. By 1881, Willie had begun formally working for the Independent, but soon after his father sold his interest in the paper and the family relocated to Bishop.

=== Career ===
A few years after his family's move, Chalfant co-founded the Inyo Register at Bishop with his father, with the first issue being published on 4 April 1885. His father left the paper in 1889, after which time Chalfant began acting as the sole editor.

In 1913, the City of Los Angeles established an aqueduct harvesting water from the Sierra Nevada Mountains in Inyo and Mono Counties. The unfavorable reaction to the aqueduct among many Owens Valley residents resulted in what became known as the California Water Wars. Chalfant acted as a staunch advocate of the Owens Valley residents from the announcement of the aqueduct project on 29 July 1905 through his death in 1943.

=== Published works ===
Later in life, Chalfant wrote a number of books dealing with the history of California and the American West. His unique position as the son of the county's pioneer newspaper publisher put him at an advantage collecting and accessing texts and anecdotes regarding early Eastern California history.

In 1922, Chalfant self-published The Story of Inyo, with the author's intent being to "preserve, particularly, the record of Inyo County earlier than 1870, when a printed record began." The first edition of the book ended on a cautiously optimistic note regarding the relationship between Los Angeles and Inyo County. However, the second edition released in 1933 contained a new ending chapter that painted the actions of LA in a highly unfavorable light.

In 1928, the Christopher Publishing House printed Chalfant's Outposts of Civilization, a book that covered mining communities throughout Eastern California and Nevada. Stanford University Press printed Death Valley: The Facts in 1930 and Tales of the Pioneers in 1942. Tales contains anecdotes about Eastern California and the southwest, including stories about Mono Lake, Death Valley, Bodie, and Pioche, Nevada.

Many of Chalfant's books remained in print in the years following his death. In 1947, selections from Outposts of Civilization and Tales of the Pioneers were posthumously published by Stanford University Press as Gold, Guns, and Ghost Towns.

== Personal life ==
Chalfant married Flora Mallory on 21 September 1892. They did not have any children.

== Death ==
Chalfant died at his home in Bishop at 12:30am on 5 November 1943. He was 75 years old.

Chalfant was buried in the family plot at the East Line Street Cemetery in Bishop with Christian Science funeral services.

== Legacy ==
The Inyo Register continues to act as the primary newspaper for Inyo County, typically publishing three physical issues per week in addition to its online presence.

California historian William Karhl wrote in his 1983 book Water and Power: The Conflict Over Los Angeles Water Supply in the Owens Valley that Chalfant's point of view regarding the City of Los Angeles' activities within Inyo County "informed most of the fictional accounts of the conflict that have appeared as novels and films."

In 1991, Chalfant was posthumously inducted into the California Newspaper Hall of Fame.

== Works ==
- The Story of Inyo (1922, revised 1933). Chalfant Press.
- Outposts of Civilization (1928). The Christopher Publishing House.
- Death Valley: The Facts (1930). Stanford University Press.
- Tales of the Pioneers (1942). Stanford University Press.
- Gold, Guns and Ghost Towns (1947). Stanford University Press. Posthumous compilation of selections from previously published works. Reprinted by Chalfant press in 1975.
