= Mountain View Voice =

American newspaper

- Type: Nonprofit news site
- Owner: Embarcadero Media Foundation
- Editor: Zoe Morgan
- Founded: December 1992
- Headquarters: 450 Cambridge Avenue, Palo Alto, California, U.S.A.
- Circulation: 200,000 unique monthly visitors (as of May, 2020)
- Website: www.mv-voice.com

The Mountain View Voice is an American independent newspaper published by Embarcadero Media Foundation and covering Mountain View, California. Formerly a free weekly, since March 2020 it has been a wholly online publication.

== History ==
The Mountain View Voice was established in December 1992 by Kate Wakerly and Carol Torgrimson as a monthly independent newspaper. They ran operations for a time from Wakerly's basement. It was briefly called the Voice of Mountain View.

In March 1994, Wakerly and Torgrimson sold the Voice to Embarcadero Publishing Co., which already owned newspapers in two neighboring cities, the Palo Alto Weekly and the Menlo Park Almanac. Embarcadero Publishing changed the Voice's schedule to weekly. Reporter Rufus Jeffris became the editor, until 1998.

Wakerly returned as publisher in 2000, stepping down in 2002 because of a diagnosis. Tom Gibboney took over as publisher, and Wakerly died in 2004 after a long battle with breast cancer. Wakerly was posthumously honored as the 2004 Public Sector Hero by the Peninsula Interfaith League for her work founding the Voice. Justin Scheck became managing editor in 2001. Candice Shih was named managing editor in 2003, and was succeeded by Don Frances. Gibboney retired from his position as editor and publisher in 2014, handing the reins to longtime Almanac reporter Andrea Gemmet.

The Voice was available free from street news racks in Mountain View, and offered paid subscriptions for delivery. In 2016 it instituted a pay meter system for non-subscriber access to online articles.

At the onset of the COVID-19 pandemic, the Voice was forced to cease publishing a physical paper in March 2020 but continued to post stories online. While the move was supposed to be temporary, in May that year, then-publisher Bill Johnson announced the Voice would remain an online-only publication indefinitely. When it was a weekly paper, the Voice was adjudicated as a paper of general circulation to publish legal notices in Santa Clara County. Since it became wholly online, its sister publication, the Palo Alto Weekly, has taken over its legal publishing business.

During the pandemic, Gemmet become editor of both the Voice and The Almanac. She left Embarcadero Media in 2023 to lead Punch Magazine. Reporter Kevin Forestieri took over as editor of the Voice until his departure in 2025, when he was succeeded by education reporter Zoe Morgan.

The Voice was headquartered in Mountain View, on Evelyn Avenue, until 2009, when Embarcadero Media consolidated the staff of its three weeklies at a purpose-built building in Palo Alto. The company transitioned to a nonprofit in 2024 and was renamed Embarcadero Media Foundation. Its editorial and design staff, including the staff of the Voice, unionized in 2023. The Voice and its sister publications are members of the California News Publishers Association, which Johnson headed when he was publisher.

Through a partnership with the Voice's parent company, its Mountain View coverage also appears on the San Jose Spotlight's website.

== Major Stories ==
A Voice investigation revealed that the Mountain View Police Department had accidentally shared access to its Automated License Plate Reader (ALPR) system with federal and state authorities in violation of its own policies and state law. Following the Voice's article, Mountain View shut off its ALPR system and blamed tech company Flock Safety for sharing the information. The city cited the Voice as the reason to shut off the cameras pending further discussions.

== Awards ==
At the California Newspaper Publishers Association annual meeting in 2014, reporter Daniel DeBolt and photographer Michelle Le won first place in environmental reporting for "Toxic city: Danger from TCE lurks underground", a series on the toxic plume in northeast Mountain View caused by careless disposal of trichloroethylene by computer chip manufacturers in the mid-20th century. The Voice placed second in its category in the General Excellence competition; it took first place in 2016 and 2018.

Year	Nominated work	Category	Award	Result	Notes	Ref.
2024	Coverage of Life Moves	Investigative Reporting	California News Publishers Association	1st place		
2024	Mountain View High School	Coverage of Youth and Education	California News Publishers Association	2nd place	Awarded to reporter Zoe Morgan	
2024	Coverage of Kick Volleyball and kayak polo	Sports Feature	California News Publishers Association	2nd place	Awarded to reporter Emily Margaretten	
2024	Foothill College Photos	Feature Photos	California News Publishers Association	3rd place	Awarded to reporter Magali Gauthier	

== Notable people ==
- Jose Antonio Vargas, interned at the Voice
- James Tensuan, photographer, interned at the Voice
