= Bakersfield Californian Building =

- The Historic Bakersfield Californian Building
- U.S. National Register of Historic Places
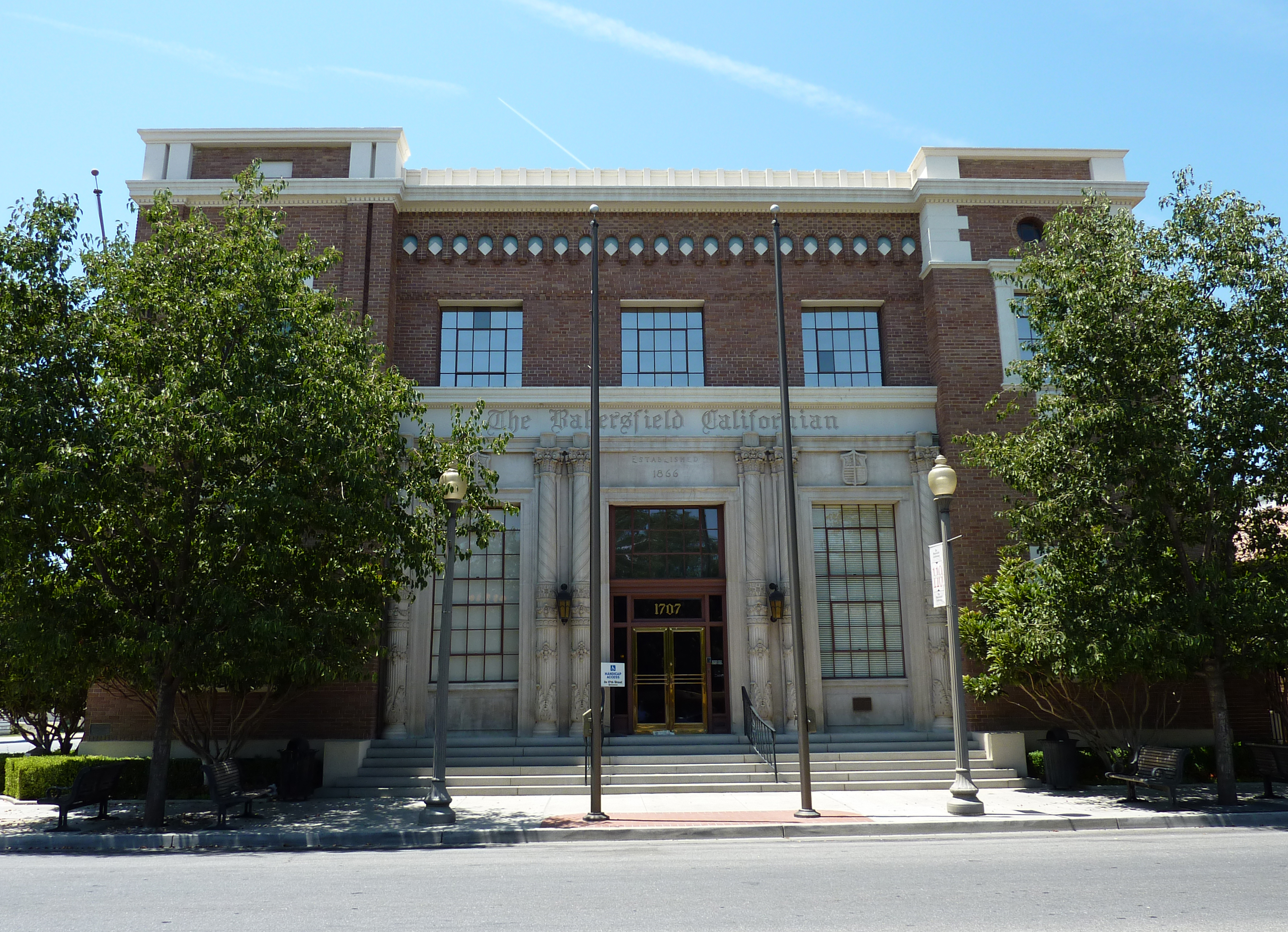
- Street (east) facade of main building.

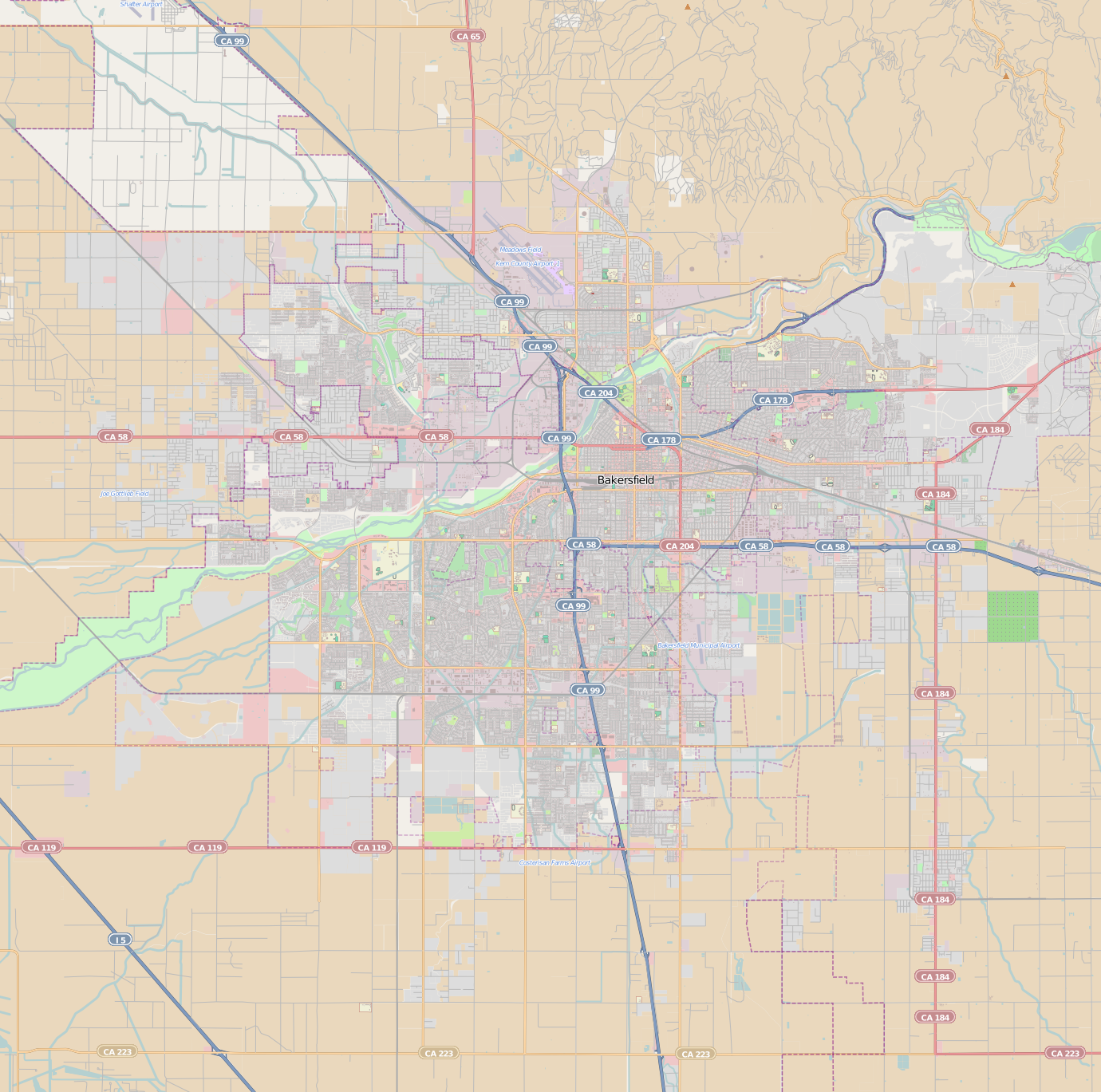
- Location within Bakersfield, California Location within California Location within the United States
- Location: 1707 Eye St., Bakersfield, California
- Coordinates: 35°22′30″N 119°1′10″W
- Area: 0.5 acres (0.20 ha)
- Built: 1926
- Built by: Henry Eissler
- Architect: Charles H. Biggar
- Architectural style: Late 19th and 20th Century Revivals; Italian Renaissance Revival
- NRHP reference No.: 83001183
- Added to NRHP: March 10, 1983

The Bakersfield Californian Building is a historic office building in Bakersfield, California. Built for the newspaper The Bakersfield Californian, it was added to the National Register of Historic Places (NRHP) on March 10, 1983.

== Structure ==
The Bakersfield Californian Building consists of two structures, both faced with reddish-brown bricks and with a primary facade facing east. Originally, the four-story main building was rectangular in shape, but over time additions made it L-shaped. A detached, 900 square feet (84 m^{2}) rectangular structure, designed as a women's rest facility, is located at the northeast corner of the larger one. The fenestration of the primary structure is symmetrically laid out with steel sash windows on all four sides. Exterior brick pilasters on the secondary sides cover the structural steel. The main entry on the eastern facade consists of seven wide granite steps which lead to polished brass double glass doors. The entry is divided into three sections by columns, each features a large, rectangular opening. The two side sections hold large, multi-paned windows and heraldic shields above, one with the name of the architect. The center section, framed by Corinthian columns includes the main door along with a multi-paned transom; above the door is inscribed "Established 1866". The parapet above the sections is inscribed with "The Bakersfield Californian"; a later renovation placed a new inscription, using a new font, in front of the original inscription. The entire entrance facade is inset between two brick-faced towers with parapets; the towers have a set of twelve paned windows in the first floor and the same on the third. The southeast tower has wrought iron balustrades that round the corner, covering large French doors with white lintel and has a flag pole at the top. The northeast tower consists of two towers and is finished with a shorter ¾ round turret topped with a terra cotta roof. Above the third-story windows on the eastern facade, and between the towers, is a course of small blind brick arches.

The second, smaller structure has similar features to the main building, and was specifically designed to accommodate women visiting downtown Bakersfield. The cultural norms of the era made it difficult for women to find public restrooms, and it was not appropriate to enter local buildings to use facilities.

== Significance ==
As a newspaper, The Bakersfield Californian is a descendant of Kern County's first newspaper, the Havilah Courier (1866). Havilah was the first county seat before local government was moved to Bakersfield. Built in 1926, the building itself is considered an architectural landmark and a reminder of the golden years of the newspaper. The publisher at the time, Alfred Harrell, was an esteemed member of the community and from his tenure starting in 1897 to his death in 1946, built the newspaper's reputation as an institution committed to civic responsibility.
