= Hellenic Journal =

The Hellenic Journal is a monthly news magazine aimed at the Greek-American community of the western United States.

== History and profile ==
Hellenic Journal was founded by Frank Peter Agnost and the first issue appeared in April 1975. It delivers news each month about Greece, local communities, features, organizations, cuisine, sports, dancing and much more to an audience of savvy readers embracing Greek life.
