= The Salinas Californian =

Newspaper in Salinas, California

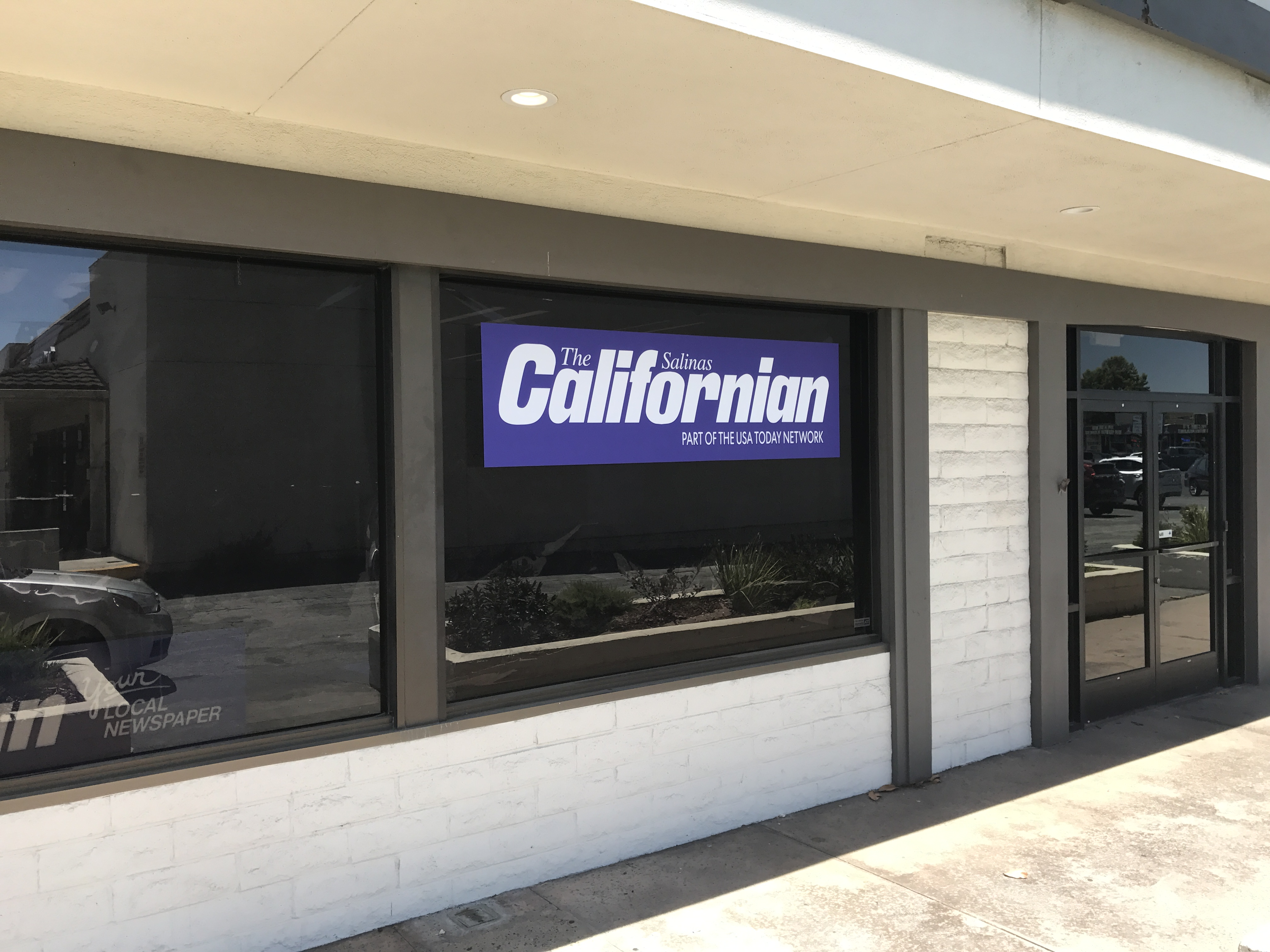
- Type: Daily newspaper
- Owner: USA Today Co.
- Founder: Melville Byerly
- Editor: Sheyanne Romero
- Founded: March 31, 1871
- Language: English
- Headquarters: Salinas, California
- Circulation: 6,000-7,000
- OCLC number: 26092808
- Website: thecalifornian.com

Logo in 2005

The Salinas Californian, sometimes referred to as The Californian, is a digital and print newspaper published in Salinas, California, covering mainly the Salinas Valley. Founded in 1871 as The Salinas City Index, it went through several name changes and assumed its current name during World War II. The paper is part of the USA Today Network, owned by USA Today Co., which acquired its parent company Speidel Newspapers Inc., in 1977.

== History ==
In 1869, J. Selwyn Brittain founded the Salinas Valley Standard, the first paper in Salinas and first in Monterey County outside the city of Monterey. It was quickly sold to prominent druggist E.M. Reading, followed in 1871 by Harry V. Morehouse, who was a teacher in Blanco. Around that time Melville Byerly moved his plant to town and started a successor to the Standard called the Salinas City Weekly Index. He died in 1876, and the paper was then passed on to his brother-in-law, county school superintendent Samuel M. Shearer.

In October 1876, William J. Hill relaunched the paper as the Salinas Daily Index. Hill published it for 33 years. In 1909, a company formed called The Salinas Index Publishing Company, headed by former mayor D.A. Madeira, and acquired the Index from Hill. In 1919, Madeira sold the Index to Fred Weybret. In 1928, Weybret purchased the Salinas Morning Journal from Paul P. Parker and merged it with the Index to form the Salinas Index-Journal.

In 1932, Weybret sold the paper to E.L. Sherman, of Modesto. In 1936, Merritt C. Speidel and Graham M. Dean bought the Salinas Index-Journal from E.L. Sherman and the Salinas Daily Post from Frank Cornell. In 1942, the two papers were merged to form The Salinas Californian due to the economic conditions amid World War II. In 1977, Speidel Newspapers was sold and merged into Gannett.

In 2015, the Californian decreased it's print schedule to three days a week: Wednesday, Friday, and Saturday. At that time the paper had a circulation around 7,000.

As of December 2022, the newspaper had no reporters on staff, with all remaining content sourced from other Gannett newspapers, notably the Record Searchlight in Redding, 300 miles north. El Sol de Salinas was also shut down due to a lack of content. One reporter was hired on staff in August 2024.
