= Embarcadero Media Foundation =

Newspaper publishing company

- Status: 501(c)(3) Nonprofit organization
- Predecessor: The Embarcadero Publishing Company
- Founded: 1979
- Founder: Bill Johnson, Robert Heinen, Roger Sanford
- Headquarters location: 2345 Yale St., Palo Alto, California
- Publication types: Palo Alto Weekly, Palo Alto Online, The Almanac, Mountain View Voice, The Six Fifty, Pleasanton Weekly, Livermore Vine, RWC Pulse, Peninsula Foodest
- Official website: www.embarcaderomediagroup.com

Embarcadero Media Foundation is a publishing company whose titles include the Palo Alto Weekly, The Almanac, the Mountain View Voice, the Pleasanton Weekly, The Six Fifty, and Palo Alto Online.

The company was founded as The Embarcadero Publishing Company in 1979 by William Johnson and was renamed Embarcadero Media in 2009.

Johnson served as president and CEO until 2022, when he announced that he would retire and be succeeded by Adam Dawes, while remaining chairman of the board of directors.

In November 2023, the company announced the transition to a non-profit.

On September 26, 2023 reporters at the Embarcadero Media Foundation announced they were forming a union of reporters, editors and visual journalists. 90% of non-management newsroom employees signed a union authorization card for representation as a unit of the Pacific Media Workers Guild and the union won voluntary recognition a month later.

== Transition to Nonprofit Status ==
On November 15, 2023, Embarcadero issued a press release acknowledging that in recent years, Embarcadero Media had faced significant challenges, including declining advertising revenue due to the local business closures from the pandemic and changing shopping patterns away from local retailers, the press release stated. "Across our three newspapers and special publications, we've seen our print ads revenue decline by more than 42% since the end of 2019. Revenue across our entire operation, including print, our seven news websites and three newsletters, has declined by 32%," Chief Executive Officer Adam Dawes wrote. "All over the country, news organizations are failing or on the verge of failure, primarily due to the steady decline in advertising revenue that has stemmed from the use of digital media," Executive Chairman of Embarcadero Media Bill Johnson said.

== Hacking ==
On September 17, 2015 at 10:30 p.m, all Embarcadero Media sites paloaltoonline.com, mv-voice.com, almanacnews.com, pleasantonweekly.com and danvillesanramon.com were hacked and replaced with a message purporting to be from the hacking group Anonymous that said The Almanac had not removed content that was "harmful to the wellbeing and safety of others." After a two-year FBI investigation, Richmond resident Ross M. Colby, 35, was indicted and subsequently convicted for the hack. While no personal information was leaked, Embarcadero Media later learned two Almanac articles were edited.
