= The Western Outlook =

African American newspaper from 1894 to 1928

- Type: Weekly newspaper
- Format: Print
- Founder(s): Joseph S Francis, J. Lincoln Derrick, W.G Maddox, Jesse E. Wysinger.
- Editor: J. Lincoln Derrick, W.G Maddox, Jesse E. Wysinger.
- Founded: September 1, 1894
- Ceased publication: 1928
- City: San Francisco, California
- Country: USA

The Western Outlook was an African American newspaper that was published from 1894 to 1928. The creators and editors behind the paper were Joseph S. Francis, J. Lincoln Derrick, W.G Maddox, Jesse E. Wysinger. The first edition was published on September 1, 1894, in San Francisco, California, but the production was later moved to Oakland, California. The newspaper came out weekly and at the time of publication, a subscription was 25 cents a month. The newspaper featured articles surrounding social events, news, and stories along with featuring a plethora of advertisements. The Western Outlook was digitized by the Library of Congress as a part of their Miscellaneous Negro newspapers microfilm collection, which contains more than 150 African American newspapers.

== Content ==
The Western Outlook was published on Sundays and consisted of a variety of community related topics. Some examples of articles and columns included weekly death announcements, news surrounding fraternities, and activities being hosted by the NAACP. Additionally, the newspaper had some Christian affiliations and had a page dedicated to advertising different churches in the community.

== Editors ==
=== W. G. Maddox ===
Walter George Maddox was born on August 29, 1870, in Sacramento, California. He served in the army prior to his work with the Western Outlook. He married Mamie Elizabeth White Maddox in 1893 and they had two children. Maddox died on Feb 20, 1957, in Glenn County, California.

=== Jesse E. Wysinger ===
Jesse Edward Wysinger was born in Merced County, California in April 1865. Wysinger was the son of African American pioneer Edmond Wysinger, who filed the lawsuit that led to the ruling that California public schools could no longer be segregated. Wysinger died on November 29, 1933, in Alameda, California.

=== Joseph S. Francis ===
Joseph S. Francis was born in California in about 1860. Prior to his work with the Western Outlook, he worked in the railroad industry. He was married to Laura V. Francis with whom he had one child. Francis died on Mar 10, 1920, in San Francisco, California.

=== J. Lincoln Derrick ===
John Abraham Lincoln Derrick was born in about 1868 in California. He was married three times and had two children in his second marriage. Derrick died on September 25, 1934, in Napa, California.
