= Manteca Bulletin =

Newspaper in Manteca, California

- Type: Daily newspaper
- Format: Broadsheet
- Owner: 209 Multimedia
- Founder(s): F.L. Wurster; A.L. Cowell
- Editor: Dennis Wyatt
- Founded: November 1908 (as Irrigation Bulletin)
- Language: English
- Headquarters: 1215 W. Center St. #203, Manteca, California, United States
- Circulation: 5,350 Daily (as of 2011)
- Sister newspapers: Turlock Journal
- ISSN: 0745-2748
- Website: mantecabulletin.com

The Manteca Bulletin is a daily community newspaper for Manteca, California, United States. The Bulletin has been in publication since 1908 and is owned by 209 Multimedia.

== History ==
In November 1908, F.L. Wurster and A.L. Cowell founded the Irrigation Bulletin in Stockton, California. It was created to promote the interests of the forerunner to the South San Joaquin Irrigation District, and was essentially a series of flyers distributed statewide promoting the irrigation of sandy loam soil around Manteca. In 1910, Fred S. Holman acquired the paper and relocated it to Ripon. At that time the Bulletin was expanded into a standard-size weekly newspaper.

In 1911, J.B. Dixon founded the Manteca Enterprise. In 1912, Holman moved the Bulletin to Manteca. In 1914, Dixon, announced plans to relocate the paper to Atlanta, California. However, the Enterprise ceased. A few months later R.D. Bessac bought the paper from Dixon and revived it. In 1918, Holman acquired the Enterprise from Bessac and merged it into the Bulletin. Later that year, Holman sold the paper to J.D. Dean.

In 1923, George Murphy Sr. and Louis Meyer purchased the Bulletin from Dean. This began 50 years of ownership by the Murphy family. Murphy Sr. retired as publisher in 1946 and retired from active staff in 1959. He was succeeded by his son George Murphy Jr., who in 1963 expanded the Bulletin into a tri-weekly. In 1970, Murphy Sr. died at age 82. In 1972, Murphy Jr. sold the Bulletin to Charles Morris of Morris Multimedia. At that time the paper's circulation was 6,000. In 1991, Murphy Jr. was posthumously inducted into the California Newspaper Hall of Fame. In 2020, Morris sold its California division to 209 Multimedia.

== Criticism ==
The Bulletin has been accused of plagiarism in the past. In response to outcries over plagiarism in the newspaper's opinion pages, the Bulletin published an editorial acknowledging the problem in 2009.

== Sister publications ==
209 Multimedia, the firm which publishes the Bulletin, also publishes 209 Magazine, a bimonthly regional magazine, the semiweekly Turlock Journal, and the weekly newspapers of the Ceres Courier, the Escalon Times, the Gustine Press Standard, the Oakdale Leader, the Riverbank News, and the West Side Index of Newman.
