= Kstati =

- Type: Weekly newspaper
- Founded: 1994
- Language: Russian
- City: San Francisco, California
- Website: kstati.net

Kstati Russian-American Newspaper or Apropos-Kstati, is a weekly Russian-language newspaper published in the San Francisco Bay Area. The editors are Nikolay Sundeyev and Janna Sundeyeva. It was created in 1994 and has a circulation of 9,000.
