= Novato Advance =

Newspaper published in Novato, California

- Type: Weekly newspaper
- Owner: Marinscope Community Newspapers
- Founder: William Hanen
- Founded: July 1, 1922; 103 years ago
- Language: English
- City: Novato, California
- Country: United States
- Website: marinlocalnews.com
- Free online archives: novatoadvance-ca.newsmemory.com

Novato Advance is a weekly newspaper in Novato, California

== History ==
On July 1, 1922, William Hanen published the first edition of the Novato Advance. The paper was acquired by Jack Sparrow in 1940, James A. Cuzner in 1952, and George A. Barnwell and Fred Volz in 1955. Barnwell and business manager Gordon Adams bought out Volz in 1961, who a year later bought the Ojai Valley News.

In 1977, Scripps League Newspapers acquired the Advance. At that time the paper had a circulation of 10,600 and a staff of 16. Starting in 1999, the paper became unprofitable and was at risk of closure until 2008, when it was sold to Marinscope Community Newspapers.
