= Inland Valley Daily Bulletin =

Southern California newspaper

- Type: Daily newspaper
- Format: Broadsheet
- Owner(s): Southern California News Group (MediaNews Group)
- Founder(s): W.D. Morton; H.N Short
- Publisher: Ron Hasse
- Editor: Frank Pine
- Founded: 1882 (as The Pomona Times)
- Language: English
- Headquarters: 3200 Guasti Road, Suite 100 Ontario, California 91761
- Circulation: 38,286 Daily; 52,308 Sunday (as of September 2014)
- Website: dailybulletin.com

The Inland Valley Daily Bulletin is a daily newspaper based in Ontario, California, serving the Pomona Valley and southwest San Bernardino County. The Daily Bulletin is a member of the Southern California News Group (formerly the Los Angeles Newspaper Group), a division of MediaNews Group.

The coverage area for the Daily Bulletin includes Pomona, San Dimas, La Verne and Claremont in Los Angeles County, Chino, Chino Hills, Montclair, Ontario, Rancho Cucamonga and Upland in San Bernardino County.

== History ==
=== Progress Bulletin ===
On October 7, 1882, The Pomona Times was founded by W. D. Morton and H. N. Short. About 18 months later The Times merged with The Pomona Courier, founded by John H. Lee on December 15, 1883, and formed the Times-Courier, jointly owned by Morton and Lee, with Short withdrawing. In November 1885, Morton sold out to Charles E. Summer.

On January 31, 1885, the Pomona Progress was first published by Edward S. Stowell. The paper almost ceased after six weeks due to financial difficulties and fire destroyed its office. Col. Frank P. Fiery rescued the paper with his own funds. On May 28, 1885, Charles I. Lorbeer joined Firey as a co-owner while Stowell remained as editor and manager. On December 31, 1885, the Progress bought and absorbed the Telegram. Stowell got sick and the paper was leased on May 27, 1886, to W.D. Morton and W. Cobler. Later that year B.A. Stephens acquired the lease and ownership later reverted back to Lorbeer and Stowell. H.G. Tinsely became a co-owner on March 22, 1888.

Around that time Summer sold his half-stake in the Times to William E. Ward. His partner Lee sold out to Willard Goodwin, who was also later bought out by C.B. Messenger. Sidney M. Haskell bought out Lorbeer from the Progress on July 23, 1891, and soon bought out Tinsely as well. Gen. John Wasson, formerly of the Chino Champion, bought out Ward from the Times in August 1891. Messenger sold his Times stake on August 27, 1902 to C.B. Roberts. Haskell sold the Progress on February 20, 1905 to William Everett Stevens and Almon T. Richardson. H.H. Kinney bought the Times interests of Roberts on November 7, 1906. He became the sole owner after Wasson died.

On January 26, 1915, Edwin Ellis King, his brother W.M. King, his son Nelson J. King, and Roy L. Driscoll, purchased The Pomona Times from Kinney, who operated it for six years. The King brothers then renamed it to The Pomona Bulletin. A year later the King family expanded the paper from a weekly to a daily. On April 1, 1916, the Pomona Progress bought and absorbed the Pomona Review. On April 1, 1927, the morning Bulletin and the evening Progress merged to form the Progress-Bulletin. The newly combined circulation was 6,000. E.E. King died in 1931. Stevens died in 1948, and Richardson then succeeded him as company president.

=== The Daily Report ===
On December 16, 1885, the first issue of the Ontario Record was published. It was founded by brothers E.P. Clarke, editor of the Riverside Daily Press, and A.F. Clarke. The first issue was printed in Pomona. A decade later the Clarkes announced Record had been sold to a Mr. Houghtaling of New York so they could devote more time to their Riverside paper. In 1896, the Clarke brothers sold the Record again, this time to Robert C.P. Smith and A.A. Piddington. Smith bought out his partner after a year.

In 1901, the Ontario Record, owned by R.C.P. Smith, merged with the Ontario Observer, owned by Irving S. Watson, to form the Ontario Record-Observer. A year later banker George Chaffey bought the business and installed Shirley L. Holt as editor. Shirley left in 1904 to operate the Whittier News and was succeeded Robert O. Brackenridge. By then the paper had been renamed back to the Record.

In 1906, Fred E. Unholz bought the paper from Brackenridge, and sold it in 1909 to S.W. Wall and P.W. Tournson. Unholz soon reacquired ownership and on September 12, 1910, launched a daily edition of the Record called The Daily Republican. He sold the paper again in October 1911 to Harry L. Allen and Crombie Allen of Greensburg, Pennsylvania. The name of the Republican was changed on January 1, 1912, to The Daily Report.

On August 1, 1930, the Allen brothers announced the sale of the newspaper to Mr. and Mrs. Frank B. Appleby, from La Grande, Oregon, who had moved to Ontario with two young sons. Appleby had published newspapers in Washington, Iowa, and in La Grande. Appleby died on July 26, 1936, in the family summer home at Laguna Beach. His obituary in the Los Angeles Times noted that the Daily Report "is known as one of the most progressive and attractive-looking newspapers in Southern California." At that time, the circulation was about 4,000. His widow, Jerene C., took over as publisher of the newspaper. She later married architect Jay Dewey Harnish, and was thenceforth known as Jerene Appleby Harnish. The company went on to launch the radio station KOCS, both AM and FM.

=== Daily Bulletin ===
On March 30, 1965, Almon T. Richardson, owner of the Pomona Progress-Bulletin, purchased the Ontario Daily Report from Mrs. Jerene Appleby Harnish and her family. Mrs. Harnish was then given the honorary title "publisher emeritus". At that time the Report's daily circulation was 28,000, and the sale price of the company was $5 million.

In 1967, Donrey Media acquired The Progress-Bulletin Publishing company. A.T. Richardson was board chairman and his son C.T. Richardson was acting general manager. The sale included two dallies (Progress Bulletin of Pomona and The Daily Report of Ontario) along with six weeklies: Upland News, Montclair Tribune, Cucamonga Times, La Verne Leader, San Dimas Press and The Diamond Bar Walnut Valley Bulletin. In 1972, A.T. Richardson died. In 1985, Report co-founder Crombie Allen was posthumously inducted into the California Newspaper Hall of Fame.

In 1990, Donrey Media merged the Progress-Bulletin with The Daily Report to form the Inland Valley Daily Bulletin. At that time the combine circulation was 90,000. In 1993, Richardson was also inducted into the state newspaper hall of fame. In 1999, Digital First Media took control of the paper. After 30 years of operations from its Ontario Office, the Daily Bulletin moved to Rancho Cucamonga in 2015. A year later Harnish was also inducted into the state newspaper hall of fame.

== Oregon Smith Controversy ==
In 1953, Mrs. Jerene Appleby Harnish and other partners of the Daily Report sued Ontario City Councilman Oregon Smith for slander because Smith said at a City Council meeting that the newspaper "without question" had been following "the Communist Party line". Superior Judge Raymond H. Thompson decided in favor of Smith, whose attorney was California politician Jack B. Tenney. The judge dismissed the case because there was "no limitation" on the statements that a city council member could make during a meeting. The decision was upheld by a District Court of Appeals in January 1956, and later by the California Supreme Court.

Afterward the newspaper published an article on January 16, 1958, stating that, had the decision gone the other way, "the public would have no protection against malicious statements made by unscrupulous members of any minor legislative body." On March 3 an editorial claimed that Smith had made the charge of communism "without regard to good morals and honesty." Smith sued for $3 million, charging libel. He later amended the complaint to include the newspaper's references to him going back as far as 1949. Judge Jesse W. Curtis Jr. dismissed the complaint in February 1958.

Smith filed another suit in January or February 1957, alleging that the unsuccessful 1953 action against him by the Daily Report had been a malicious prosecution. He sought more than $1.5 million in damages.

This latter suit was dismissed by Judge Richard B. Ault of San Diego Superior Court on motion of attorney Tenney on behalf of Smith. Tenney told a reporter that an out-of-court settlement had been made, but a defense attorney denied the statement and said the plaintiff had moved for dismissal to avoid "long and costly court proceedings".
