= The Bakersfield Californian =

Newspaper in Bakersfield, California

- Type: Daily newspaper
- Format: Broadsheet
- Owner(s): Sound News Media, Inc
- Founder(s): George A. Tiffany; C.W. Bush
- Publisher: Cliff Chandler
- Editor: Christine L. Peterson
- Founded: 16 August 1866; 160 years ago
- Language: English
- Headquarters: 3700 Pegasus Drive; Bakersfield, CA 93308; U.S.
- Circulation: 31,000 Daily; 37,000 Sunday (as of 2018)
- Sister newspapers: Tehachapi News; Delano Record
- ISSN: 0276-5837
- OCLC number: 44342451
- Website: bakersfield.com

The Bakersfield Californian is a daily newspaper serving Bakersfield, California and surrounding Kern County in the state's San Joaquin Valley.

== History ==
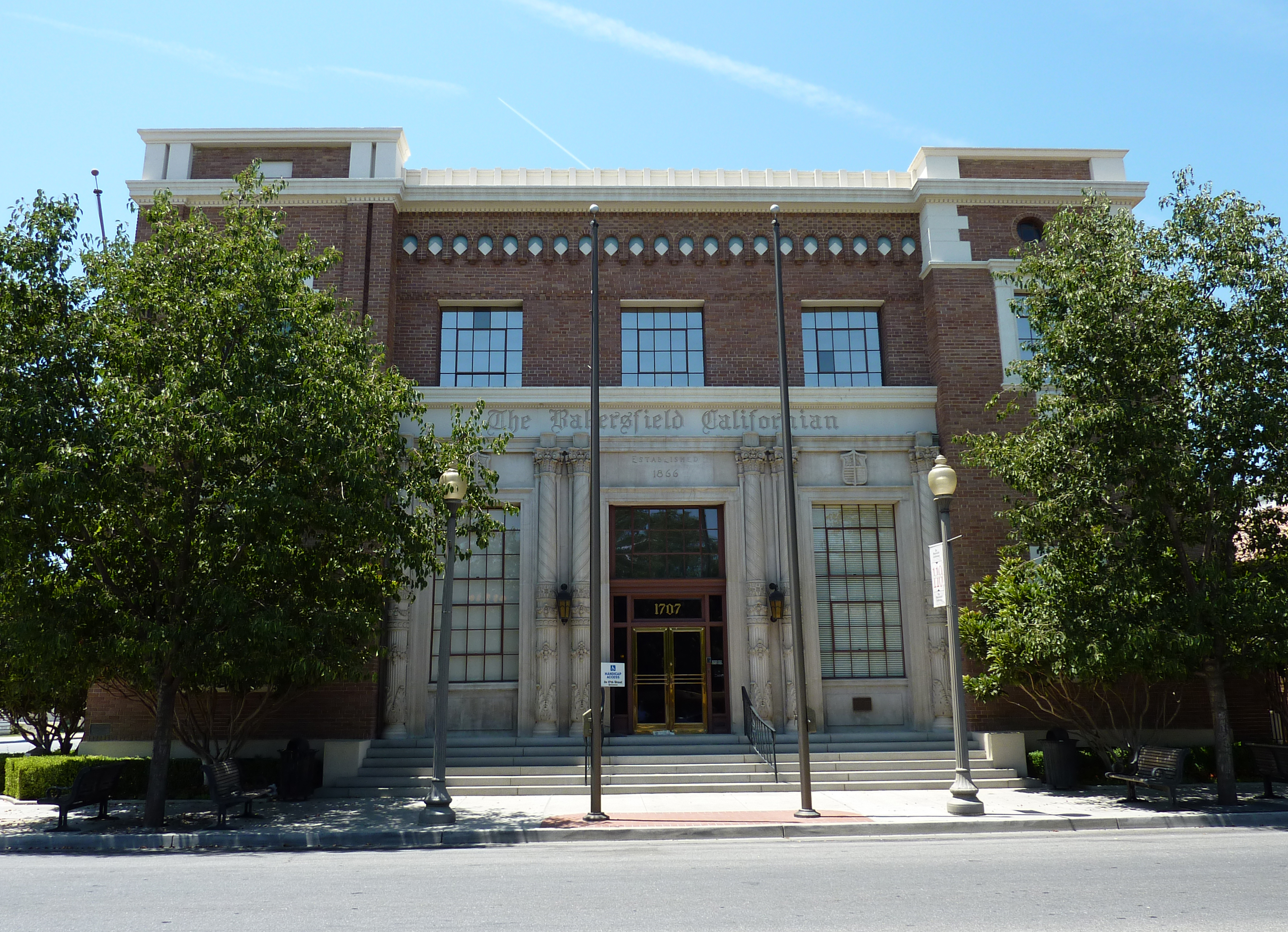
The Bakersfield Californian Building is listed on the National Register of Historic Places.

On Aug. 18, 1866, the first edition of The Weekly Courier was published in Havilah, California. George A. Tiffany was the printer and business manager. C.W. Bush was the editor. The Sacramento Bee described the Democratic newspaper as a "thoroughly fogy, fossil, and pre-rebelite." At the time Havilah was a small mining town and recently made the county seat. The Courier was Kern County's first newspaper. A year later A.D. Jones succeeded Bush as editor, and at some point the paper's name was changed to the Havilah Courier.

In 1869, Jones moved the paper southward to Bakersfield as mining dried up and agriculture boomed. It was then renamed to the Kern County Courier, also known as the Bakersfield Courier. After recovering from a severe illness that overtook the town, Jones left the Courier to operate the San Juan Echo.

In 1876, the Kern County Courier merged with the Southern Californian to form the Courier California. Julius Chester was the editor and proprietor. In 1879, via a court order, the sheriff transferred ownership to A.C. Maude, who renamed it to the Kern County Californian. Maude was raised in England and fought in the Union army during the American Civil War. He participated in Sherman's March to the Sea. Its name was changed to The Daily Californian in 1891 after it expanded from weekly to daily publication.

In 1893, George F. Weeks succeeded John Isaacs as the paper's manager. In 1897, Alfred Harrell, the Kern County superintendent of schools, purchased the newspaper from Weeks. Harrell gave The Bakersfield Californian its present name in 1907. In 1926, he moved the newspaper to 1707 Eye Street in downtown Bakersfield.

Alfred Harrell published the paper until his death in 1946. His widow Virginia M. Harrell then served as president of the Bakersfield California Corporation until she died in 1954. At that time their daughter, Bernice Harrell Chipman, assumed the position of president. She died in 1967. Berenice Fritts Koerber, granddaughter of Alfred Harrell, then became company president. Two years later Alfred Harrell was indicated by the California Press Association into the California Newspaper Hall of Fame.

In 1983, the Bakersfield Californian Building on Eye Street was placed on the National Register of Historic Places. In 1984, the paper completed construction of a $21 million publishing facility. The Harrell-Fritts Publishing Center was located at a business center near Meadows Field. Koerber died in 1988. At that time the paper had a daily circulation of 81,000.

In January 1989, Virginia F. Moorhouse, daughter of Berenice Koerber, was elected chairman and president of The Bakersfield Californian. In December 2014, Virginia "Ginny" Cowenhoven, daughter of Virginia F. "Ginger" Moorhouse, was named associate publisher, the fifth generation of the Harrell-Fritts family to serve in a leadership position at the media company.

On June 3, 2019, after 122 years of family ownership, the paper announced a deal with Canadian newspaper executive Steven Malkowitz to sell the paper to Sound News Media. The sale closed on July 1, whereupon printing operations in Bakersfield ceased and were moved to Antelope Valley, where Sound News Media owns the Antelope Valley Press. The Harrell-Fritts family retained ownership of The Harrell-Fritts Printing Press Building located at 3700 Pegasus Drive and The Historic Californian building at 1707 Eye St.

In September 2024, the newspaper announced it would cease publishing print editions on Sundays and Mondays. The paper will also transition from carrier to postal delivery. In March 2025, the paper relocated its office to the first floor of the Cal Twin Towers at 4900 California Avenue, Suite 100-A.

== Other publications ==
The Bakersfield Californian publishes several other publications in Kern County including the Tehachapi News, Kern Business Journal, Bakersfield Life Magazine and the Delano Record.

== Awards ==
In 2003, publisher Ginger Moorhouse was named "Publisher of the Year" by Editor & Publisher.

In 2004, the paper received the Payne Award for Ethics in Journalism for Robert Price's January 2003 "Lords of Bakersfield" stories, which focused on the stabbing death of Assistant District Attorney Steven Tauzer and similar crimes committed over the previous 25 years, some of which reflected negatively on the newspaper's ownership and management.

In 2020, The Bakersfield Californian earned first-place general excellence honors in the 2019 California Journalism Awards, recognizing the entire newsroom staff for its reporting and writing, photography, design and overall presentation. Also in 2020, The Californian earned honors in seven of seven categories in the 32nd annual George F. Gruner Awards, recognizing excellence in Central Valley print journalism. Meanwhile, the Tehachapi News also captured honors in five of the seven divisions.
