= Mojave Desert News =

- Type: Weekly newspaper
- Owner: Direct Results Media LLC.
- Founded: 1938
- Language: English
- Headquarters: 8016 California City Blvd.St#7 California City, California
- Country: United States
- Website: desertnews.com

Mojave Desert News is a weekly newspaper published in California City, California. Named after the Mojave Desert, it reports on news in Kern County.

== History ==
In 1937, Mrs. Joseph Hillenbrand and her husband launched the Hinkley Valley News in Hinkley, California. Mr. Hillenbrand previously worked at the Barstow Weekly Review and was employed at the Tehachapi News when his wife launched her own weekly paper.

A year later the couple moved their printing plant to Kern County and relaunched the paper as the Mojave Desert News. In December 1938, the couple helped launch a student paper at Mojave Elementary School called The Scoop. Their daughter Peggy Hillenbrand served as its first editor-in-chief.

In June 1939, Joseph Smith, brother of "Singing Jimmie" Smith, bought the News from the Hillenbrands. He published the paper for 18 years until his death in 1960. The paper was then published by his sons, Milton and William Smith.
