= Armenian Observer =

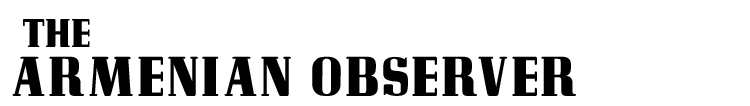
- Type: Weekly newspaper
- Owner: Osheen Keshishian
- Editor: Osheen Keshishian
- Founded: 1970
- Ceased publication: 2023
- Language: English
- Headquarters: 6646 Hollywood Blvd Ste 210, Los Angeles, CA 90028
- Website: thearmenianobserver.com

The Armenian Observer was an English-language weekly Armenian publication based in Hollywood, California. It began publication in December 1970. It was published every Wednesday, with 50 issues per year. The owner and editor-in-chief was Professor Osheen Keshishian. The paper was available by subscription only and covered a vast variety of subjects and issues locally, nationally, internationally, the Armenian diaspora and Armenia. Very limited materials were also available online.

The newspaper ceased publication in 2023.
