= Hayward Journal =

Newspaper that used to serve Hayward, California

- Type: Weekly newspaper
- Founder: Charles Coolidge
- Founded: 1877
- Ceased publication: 1950
- Language: English
- City: Hayward, California

The Hayward Journal was a newspaper that used to serve Hayward, California. It was Hayward's first newspaper.

== History ==
In 1877, Charles Coolidge founded the Haywards Weekly Journal in Hayward, California. After a few months, Frank M. Dallam acquired the paper. In 1882, George Anthony Oakes purchased the paper, which be then had been renamed to the Hayward Journal. The paper at some point expanded to semi-weekly, but in 1914 reverted back to a weekly. In 1925, Oakes died after suffering a stroke. His youngest daughter Miss Helen Oakes died a year later at age 29.

In 1927, the Oakes family sold the paper to Colin V. Dyment, former city editor of The Eugene Guard. In 1928, publisher Dyment died of Pneumonia. In 1929, his widow sold the Journal to Clyde F. Brown. But a month later the paper was sold again, this time to John Joseph "Jerry" Motzko, former part owner of the Vallejo Times.

Motzko published the Journal for 16 years. In 1945, Walter B. Stafford, former publisher of the Yreka Daily News, purchased the paper from Motzko. In 1946, Stafford was killed in a car crash at age 35. His estate then sold the Journal to James T. Ritch and J. Lowell Miller. In 1947, Lowell sold his stake to Lloyd E. Utter. In 1950, Jacob H. Arainsen, publisher of the East Bay News, bought the Journal. Utter retired from the firm soon after.

In 2016, Paul Russo attempted to revive the Journal after it ceased 60 years earlier.
