= Marinscope Community Newspapers =

Newspaper chain in Marin County, California

- Industry: Media (Newspapers)
- Founded: 1971 in Marin County, California
- Founder: Paul Anderson
- Headquarters: Marin County, California
- Products: Novato Advance; Sausalito Marin Scope; Mill Valley Herald; San Rafael News Pointer; Twin Cities Times; Ross Valley Reporter; Pacifica Tribune
- Parent: Battle Born Media
- Website: marinlocalnews.com

Marinscope Community Newspapers is a chain of six weekly newspapers in Marin County, California.

== History ==
Marinscope, Inc. was founded by Paul Anderson and his wife Billie in 1971. In 1998, business magnate Vijay Mallya bought Marinscope from Anderson. In 2008, Marinscope bought the newspaper Novato Advance from Scripps Enterprises, a company in Charlottesville, Virginia.

In March 2015, Marinscope Community Newspapers was bought by Sherman Frederick, who used to publish the Las Vegas Review-Journal, and his wife Christina. Marinscope Community Newspaper became part of Battle Born Media, a company owned by Frederick that publishes newspapers in Northern Nevada. In 2016, Marinscope purchased the Pacifica Tribune from Bay Area News Group. In 2020, the Pacifica Tribune was sold to Coastside News Group, owner of the Half Moon Bay Review.

The six newspapers published by Marinscope Community Newspapers are Novato Advance, Sausalito Marin Scope, Mill Valley Herald, San Rafael News Pointer, Twin Cities Times, and the Ross Valley Reporter.
