= Delano Record =

- Type: Semi-weekly newspaper
- Founder: Franklin H. Austin
- Founded: 1908 (as the Delano Holograph)
- Language: English
- Ceased publication: 2017
- Headquarters: Delano, California
- OCLC number: 33944043
- Website: bakersfield.com/delano-record

The Delano Record was a semi-weekly newspaper serving Delano, California and surrounding area. It ceased publication in 2017 as an individual publication, but reemerged as a subsection of the Bakersfield.com website.

== History ==
In June 1908, Franklin H. Austin published the first edition of the Delano Holograph. A month later Austin sold the paper to W.T. Boone and O.O. Robertson, two Delano real estate men. The name was then changed to the Delano Record. Austin retained the rights to the old name and used it for another publication called Austin's Illustrated Holograph.

In March 1909, R.K. Brundage bought the paper. Brundage wanted to devote more time to his real estate business, so a month later he leased the paper to Charles H. Seiders and Charles K. Seeber. Seeber left at some point and Selders edited the Record until his sudden death in November 1913. Seiders died from drinking lye, a chemical used to clean type metal. It is unknown whether his death was an intentional suicide or an accident. Seiders recently failed to secure a loan to expand his plant, which could have induced depression. However, he could have mistaken the poison for the second glass in his office, which was filled with water. At that time Seeber returned to operate the Record.

In November 1915, J.V. Van Eaton, former staffer at The Fresno Herald, purchased the Record. In January 1917, Van Eaton sold the business to Walter A. Wyatt. Wyatt became editor and L. Boyd Baker, son of Rev. A.L. Baker, was named secretary-treasurer. In April 1917, Joseph C. Norwood bought the paper. In October 1917, A.W. Thresher, publisher of the Wasco News, purchased the interest of Norwood. Rev. A.L. Baker remained a minority owner. Norwood soon launched a rival weekly paper in town called the Delano News. At that time Delano had a population of 500.

The Record was acquired by Larry A. Freeman of Los Angeles in 1942, followed by George B. Keyzers of San Gabriel in 1950. Three decades later, Keyzers sold the paper to Reed Print Co. in 1985. In 2011, Schafter Press, which printed the Record, caught fire. The fire destroyed the paper news archives, causing the loss of any material that had not previously been stored on microfiche. The newspaper closed its doors in December 2017 after Reed Print folded. The Bakersfield Californian soon added a weekly section titled the Delano Record.

== Cesar Chavez Coverage ==
During the late 1960s it was known for supporting grape growers over workers during the Delano grape strike. Cesar Chavez recalled that the Record accused him of using "vicious dogs" to scare workers into signing up for the newly formed union. In fact, the FBI file compiled on Chavez when he was considered for an appointment in the Johnson administration contained an editorial from the Record arguing that such an appointment would be a "cruel hoax":

We agree with David Fairbairn . . . that this proposed appointment is an absurdity, but we go further. We submit this is a cynical and cruel hoax that in the long run can only undermine and make a mockery of the legitimate aspirations of our citizens of Mexican ancestry for the recognition by officialdom to which they are entitled...
