= Ojai Valley News =

Local newspaper in California

- Reporting for the people
- Type: Weekly newspaper
- Owner: Ojai Media LLC
- Founder: L.H. Mesick
- Publisher: Laura Rearwin Ward
- Founded: 1891; 135 years ago
- Language: English
- Headquarters: 206 N. Signal Street, Ste. G
- City: Ojai, California
- Country: United States
- Circulation: 2300
- Sister newspapers: Ventura County Sun
- Website: ojaivalleynews.com
- Free online archives: Paid subscription

The Ojai Valley News is a locally owned and operated newspaper in Ojai, California. It is published weekly in print and daily online, and has been in continuous publication since 1891. Ojai Media LLC is its publishing company.

== History ==
On October 27, 1891, the first issue of The Ojai was published in Ojai, California, at that time named Nordhoff. It was edited by L.H. Mesick, of Santa Barbara. He few years later Mesick sold the paper in October 1895 to Sherman Day Thacher, founder of The Thacher School in Ojai. Thacher relocated the printing press to the Casa de Piedra school.

Col. Randolph R. Freeman soon acquired The Ojai. He put the paper up for sale after four years. In an editorial, Freeman wrote: "Within four years assaults with intent to kill me have been three in number, all unprovoked, and I have had some lovely fist fights." Harry Glasscock operated the paper while Freeman recuperated by driving his stagecoach around and playing tennis.

In September 1901, C.E. Bundy bought the paper from Freeman. Bundy soon put a mortgage on the property and suddenly disappeared. A year later the paper ceased and after the mortgage was foreclosed. A stock company called The Ojai Publishing Company was organized by Thacher and other locals to relaunch the paper.

After selling The Ojai, Freeman soon founded the Indio Submarine in Coachella. It was the first paper in the United States published below sea-level. Freeman once billed the Submarine as "the low dowdnest newspaper on earth" and used paper of a "submarine tint." Freeman mysteriously also went missing around the same time as Bundy in September 1902. He turned up eventually, got married and went on to operate the Coachella Valley News, which he renamed to The Sidewinder.

In February 1903, Richard Barry was named editor of The Ojai. He previously worked at the Santa Paula Chronicle. The paper ceased again a few months later. Barry soon went on to be one of the Military attachés and observers in the Russo-Japanese War. He was the only American and only English writer left with the Third Army when the Russians surrender amid the Siege of Port Arthur. After the war, Barry was one of eleven war correspondents honored by the Emperor of Japan. At some point the paper relaunched for a third time. Charles F. McCutcheon was named Ojai editor sometime around 1907 and a year later bought the plant from The Ojai Publishing Co. McCutcheon published the paper until his death in 1909 at age 25. A few years later the paper's editor was F.W. Hawes.

In December 1918, F.W. Train, formerly of the Oxnard News, became editor of The Ojai. He was soon joined by his brothers C.J. Train and T.A. Train. In 1925, Frank R. Gerald, a former school teacher, bought the paper from the Train brothers. Friz Kunz and Ernest Stone joined him in the purchase. In 1927, Dr. Annie Besant bought the business while Gerald stayed on as editor. In 1928, Gerald left the paper and was succeeded as editor by business manager Frank E. Kilbourne. Kilbourne published The Ojai for two decades until he sold it in 1947 to Morgan Coe, former owner of the Santa Paula Chronicle. In 1952, H.W. Klamser and his son, C.W. Klamser Jr., formerly of the Dearborn Press in Michigan, bought The Ojai.

In December 1957, J. Frank Knebel bought The Ojai from H.W. Klamser and The Ojai Valley News from Don A. Hill and merged the two together. The Ojai had a 2,200 circulation and the News had a circulation of 400. The merged paper was titled The Ojai and Valley News. The sale sale included the defunct The Oaks Gazette, which Knebel relaunched. Knebel severed in the public relations staff of General Mark Clark during World War II and previously published the Garden Grove News. Former editor C. William Klamser Jr. went on to work as a police officer. Knebel later sued the Hill family for violating a Non-compete clause in the sale agreement after they launched another paper in town called the Oak Valley Sentinel. A third paper called the Ojai Press was founded by Ken Harnell. Both the Sentinel and the Press were acquired and then merged by Voice of the Valley, Inc., a venture set up by a hundred locals to save both floundering papers.

In 1962, Fred J. Volz bought the Ojai Valley News and Oaks Gazette, by then a single combined paper, from Knebel. Volz was a former Navy commander and a public relations officer at Panmunjom during negotiations of the Korean Armistice Agreement. He was previously co-publisher of the Novato Advance and North Martin News. Later that year Volz bought a rival paper called The Press-Sentinel from Voice of the Valley for $10,000 and absorbed it into the News. The Volz family owned the paper for 25 years. In 1987, Fred Volz, the paper's editor and publisher, sold the News to Wick Communications for more than $2 million. At that time the paper published twice weekly and had a circulation of 7,000.

Wick then named Darrow "Duke" Tully as publisher. At that time Tully was publisher of the Williston Herald. He previously published The Arizona Republic and The Phoenix Gazette until resigning in disgrace after it was uncovered he had lied about his military service. While in Ojai, Tully expanded the paper to three issues a week. He was also found guilty of animal cruelty for shooting a dog named Baby between the eyes with an air-powered pellet rifle. In 1990, Tully left Ojai to work as president and publisher of Beacon Communications in Massachusetts. In 2000, Buchanan Communications of Tuscaloosa, Alabama, acquired the paper. Company owners William and Ava Buchanan filed for bankruptcy in 2015. Downhome Publishing then purchased the News. The business was owned by Robert "Bob" Daddi, a State Farm insurance agent. In 2021, Laura Rearwin Ward acquired the paper from Daddi.
