= Sonoma Valley Sun =

American newspaper

- Format: Biweekly newspaper
- Owner: Sonoma Valley Sun Newspaper
- Editor: Val Robichaud
- Political alignment: Democratic Party
- Language: English
- Headquarters: Sonoma, California
- City: Sonoma, California
- Country: United States
- Website: sonomasun.com
- Free online archives: Yes

The Sonoma Valley Sun, also known as the Sonoma Sun, is a bi-weekly newspaper serving the city of Sonoma, California and surrounding Sonoma Valley communities with news reporting, graphics, and photography. The paper is published in both English and Spanish.
