= Mid Valley Times =

Weekly newspaper published in Reedley, California

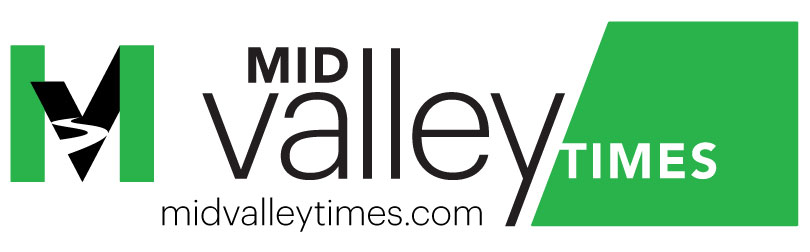

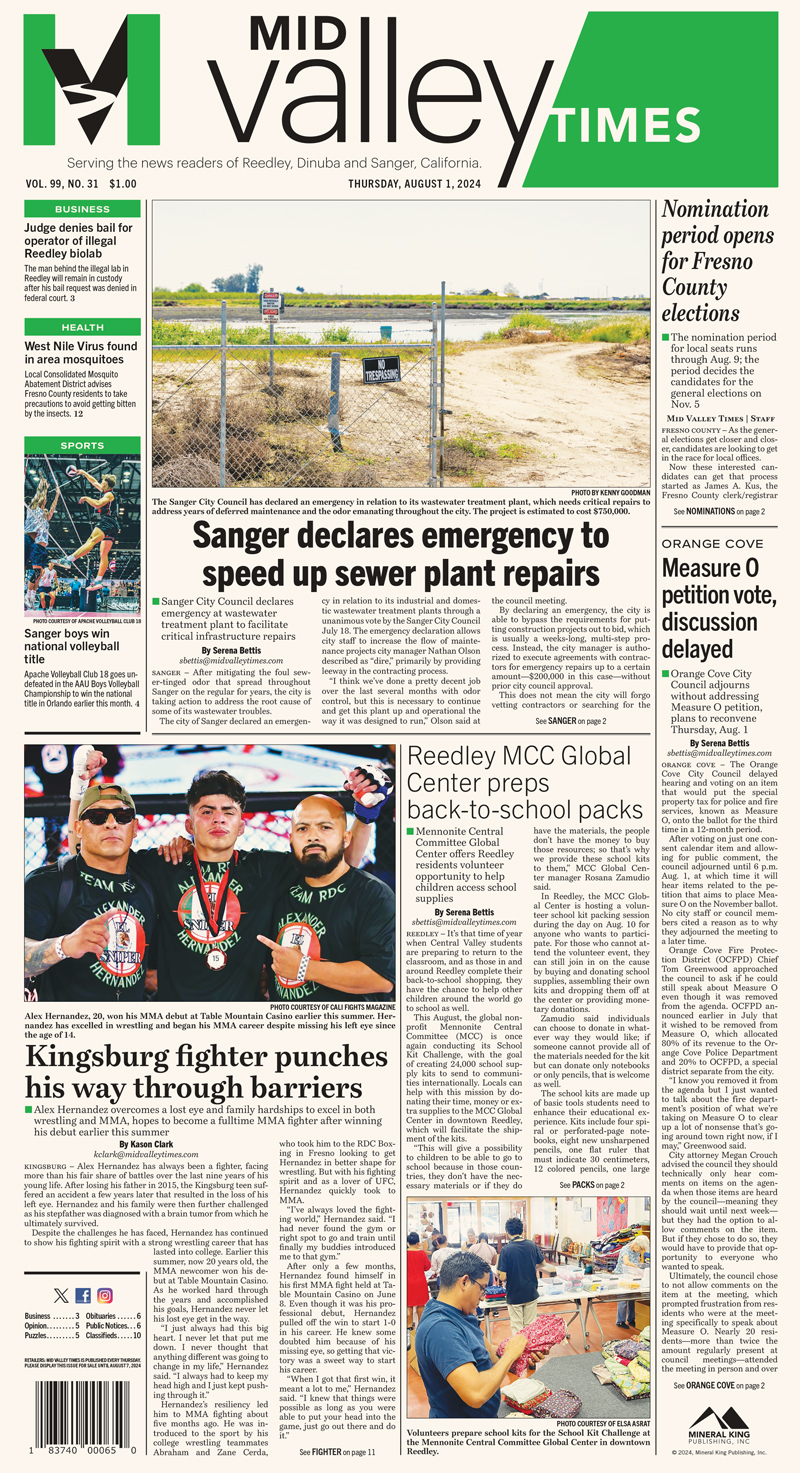
- Front page for August 1, 2024
- Type: Weekly newspaper
- Format: Broadsheet
- Owner(s): Mineral King Publishing, Inc.
- Founder(s): E. P. Dewey (Sanger Herald); A.S. Jones (Reedley Exponent)
- Publisher: Reggie Ellis
- Editor: Paul Myers
- Founded: 1889; 137 years ago (as the Sanger Herald); 1891; 135 years ago (as the Reedley Exponent)
- Language: English
- Headquarters: 1059 G Street, Reedley, CA 93654 United States
- Circulation: 3,300 (as of 2023)
- Sister newspapers: The Exeter Sun-Gazette
- OCLC number: 38869692
- Website: midvalleytimes.com

The Mid Valley Times is a weekly newspaper, published on Thursdays, serving Reedley, Dinuba, Sanger, and surrounding communities in Fresno County and Tulare County, California. It was formed when the Dinuba Sentinel, Reedley Exponent and Sanger Herald were consolidated into a single publication. The paper is owned by Mineral King Publishing, publisher of The Sun-Gazette.

== History ==
=== Sanger Herald ===
On May 11, 1889, E. P. Dewey published the first edition of the Sanger Herald.John Thomas Walton was the paper's first subscriber. Dewey published the paper for 25 years.

The Herald was acquired by C.F. Quinn in 1915, followed by Orvel "Royal" Le Blanc in 1918, who died about 10 months later from Spanish flu. In 1919, his widow sold the paper to Roy L. Graham. In 1920, Graham acquired the rival Sanger News from Howard W. Russell and absorbed it into the Herald.

Roy A. Brown was a co-owner for about a year until buying out Graham in 1921. The paper was then was acquired by Seymour C. Sterling in 1943, and Glenn Hage and Gordon Olsen in 1968.

=== Reedley Exponent ===
On March 26, 1891, A.S. Jones, formerly of Mandan, North Dakota, published the first edition of the Reedley Exponent. The first edition of the paper was printed in a room at the Knauer home and post office building. It moved to G Street the following year; that office burned down and was later rebuilt. The paper was acquired by W.W. Holland in September 1892, followed by John Fairweather in June 1896. He was an active public political figure.

In 1914, Willie O. Besaw, a local photographer, experimented with self-cancelling stamp designs in the Exponent office. Besaw later applied for a U.S. patent for his design. In 1915, John Fairweather handed control of the Exponent over to his son John Henry Fairweather, who in 1920 saved two women and a man from drowning at Ward's Oak Park.

In 1929, John Fairweather died at age 84. In 1933, J.H. Fairweather was elected local postmaster, and was succeeded as publisher by his daughter Helen Fairweather-Stondall. She was soon joined at the paper by her brother, John Henry Fairweather, Jr. After the attack on Pearl Harbor, J.H. Fairweather, Jr. enlisted in the United States Navy and left the Exponent entirely to his brother, James W. Fairweather. In 1945, J.H. Fairweather died at age 71, and his wife Theodocia V. Fairweather died in 1969 at age 93.

=== Shared ownership ===
After publishing the paper for 79 years, the Fairweather family sold the Reedley Exponent in July 1970 to husband-and-wife Norma and Glenn Hage, co-owners of the Sanger Herald. In April 1974, the Hages bought out Gordon Olson from the Herald and assumed full control of the paper.

In December 1976, John P. McGoff, president of Panax Corp. and owner of The Sacramento Union, purchased the Exponent and the Herald from the Hages. The papers would be operated by his business, Sierra Publishing Company. In 1982, Foothill Communications Corporations, owner of The Folsom Telegraph and Orangeville News, acquired the Exponent, Herald and five other papers from Sierra Publishing.

In 1983, a group of seven investors led by Edward R. Padilla acquired six papers from the company for $1.5 million including the Herald, Exponent and Telegraph. The new venture was named Natomas Publishing Co., Inc. Co-owner Rosemary Kallio then served as Herald and Exponent publisher, and fellow co-owner Kenneth L. Just joined her in operating the papers.

The ownership group reestablished the Parlier Post and established the Orange Cove & Mountain Times. In March 1989, the Telegraph was sold to Lesher Communications, Inc. for $1.6 million. In June 1993, the Fowler Ensign was acquired. In July 1993, Paul Wahl was named group publisher, succeeding Kallio. In April 1995, Fred Hall replaced Wahl. By then the firm was named Mid-Valley Publications. In December 1993, Just died. In February 2000, Kallio died.

In June 2010, the 101-year-old Dinuba Sentinel was acquired. In November 2014, Mid-Valley closed the Times and Ensign, and announced it was looking to sell its remaining publications.

=== Mid Valley Times ===
On July 4, 2019, the Reedley Exponent, Dinuba Sentinel and Sanger Herald were merged into a single publication called the Mid Valley Times. In May 2023, Mineral King Publishing, owner of the Exeter Sun-Gazette, acquired the Times.
