= Daily Republic =

Newspaper in Fairfield, California

- Type: Daily newspaper
- Format: Broadsheet
- Owner: McNaughton Newspapers
- Founder(s): C.A. Cellers; T. McGeorge
- Publisher: Foy McNaughton; T. Burt McNaughton
- Founded: November 1855; 170 years ago (as Solano County Herald); 1862; 164 years ago (as Solano Press)
- Language: English
- Headquarters: 1250 Texas St. Fairfield, California
- Country: United States
- Circulation: Approx. 14,500 (as of 2014)
- ISSN: 0746-5858
- OCLC number: 10133416
- Website: dailyrepublic.com

The Daily Republic is a daily newspaper in the town of Fairfield, California. It is owned by McNaughton Newspapers. The paper was previously known as the Solano Republican, which formed after the Solano County Herald and the Solano Press merged. The Daily Republic was the first newspaper in the nation to editorially support Abraham Lincoln for president.

== History ==
On November 5, 1855, C.A. Cellers and T. McGeorge published the first edition of the Solano County Herald in Benicia, California. McGeorge left the paper at some point. B.L. Gorman became co-owner in March 1857. Cellers left a month later, and Gorman sold the paper to William J. Hooton in June 1858. The Herald relocated to Suisun City with its first publication there on October 2, 1858, with offices in a building on the south side of the city plaza.

In March 1860, G. Lawton Jr. sold the Herald to A.R. Gunuison. In September 1861, editor O.B. Powers was elected state senator for Solano and Yolo counties. In June 1862, H. Hubbard launched a rival paper in Suisun City called the Solano Press. In January 1863, Hooton died. In September 1866, George A. Gillespie bought the Press.

In November 1869, Judge Powers, owner of the Herald, and Gillespie, owner of the Press, merged their papers together to form the Solano Republican. Gillespie eventually left. In October 1875, Powers sold the paper to Will N. Bowen and Charlie F. Montgomery. Montgomery left the paper in 1879, and four years later he was arrested for fatally shooting a rival newsman. In February 1880, the paper was sold at auction to O.R. Coghlan for $1,500. That December, Bowen bought it back.

In March 1884, W.A. Newcum and G.B. Heazleton bought the paper. Heazleton soon left. Newcum published an editorial criticizing Charles Coffran. On September 5, 1885, the two men ran into each other outside the Oriole saloon and a brawl ensued. They drew and fired their pistols during the scuffle, but both Newcum and Coffran missed. Bowen bought the paper again from Newcum in June 1889. Edward Dinkelspiel became co-owner in July 1893, and bought Bowen out a year later. In 1900, his brother Jonas Dinkelspiel died by suicide after shooting himself while staying at the Winchester Hotel in San Francisco.

The Solano Republican had many owners through the beginning of the 20th century. It was acquired from Dinkelspiel by Elliot J. Clawson in May 1910, John F. Galvin in January 1911, Wesley L. Davis in September 1911, and David A. Weir in June 1919. Weir owned the Republican for the next 31 years. Weir was born in Sterling, Colorado in 1889. After working at The Denver Post and the Chicago Tribune, he published papers in Nebraska, Oregon and Porterville before buying the Republican. Weir was also instrumental in establishing the local Lions Club, American Legion post 208 and the county's mosquito abatement district. Weir retired from publishing November 1, 1949, and sold the Republican to J. Clifton Toney. Toney operated the newspaper until 1960, when he sold it to the McNaughton family.

The McNaughtons had roots in journalism dating back to the 1920s. Foye Fisk "F.F." McNaughton, grandfather of present-day CEO Foy McNaughton, graduated from Columbia University's first master's degree program in journalism. He went on to work for a New York City newspaper. A few years later, he returned to his home state of Indiana to purchase a small paper in Bicknel. After making it a success, he purchased the Pekin Daily Times in Pekin, Illinois. This became his flagship paper. His son, Dean McNaughton, joined the family business during the late 1940s. Dean McNaughton journeyed to California in 1960 and purchased the Solano Republican. Within the first year he owned the newspaper, Dean McNaughton increased the publication from two to five days a week, Monday through Friday, and renamed it the Daily Republic. The newspaper eventually was expanded to publish seven days a week.

The McNaughtons purchased the Placerville Mountain Democrat in 1964, and The Davis Enterprise in 1966. A year later the owner's brother John T. McNaughton died. The family continued to purchase other papers, including the Winters Express in 1994, Village Life in El Dorado Hills and Cameron Park in 1997, and the Georgetown Gazette in 2004. Dean McNaughton died in 2012. At that time the company was managed by his sons Foy McNaughton and Burt McNaughton, along with his grandson, T. Burt McNaughton. In 2013, Dean McNaughton was posthumously inducted into the California Newspaper Hall of Fame. In September 2020, the Daily Republic suspended its Thursday and Saturday print editions.
