= Turlock Journal =

Newspaper published in Turlock, California

- Type: Twice-weekly newspaper
- Owner: 209 Multimedia
- Founder(s): Harry Randolph and Jack Randolph
- Publisher: Hank Vander Veen
- Editor: Kristina Hacker
- Founded: 1904
- Language: English
- Headquarters: 121 S Center St, Turlock, California
- Sister newspapers: Manteca Bulletin
- Website: turlockjournal.com

The Turlock Journal is a newspaper in Turlock, California. It is owned by 209 Multimedia. The Journal was a daily newspaper until 2004, when it was reduced to twice-weekly publication. It has a paid circulation of approximately 4,000.

== History ==
The first edition of the Turlock Journal was published on Nov. 11, 1904. A nearby paper called the Stanislaus County Weekly News reported on the launch, writing "Turlock has launched another craft on the sea of newspaperdom." The paper was founded by Harry and Jack Randolph. In 1901, Jack sold his interest to Harry and went into the phone business. Harry continued to operated the Journal until just after World War I.

Printer Edwin Earl Ullberg purchased the Turlock Weekly Journal from Harry Randolph on June 1, 1919. Twelve days later he changed the newspaper to a daily production and the name became the Turlock Daily Journal. Ullberg ran into financial difficulties and had to sell the paper. In December 1920, Ullberg sold the Journal to the Farmers' Press Association. The cooperative briefly changed the name of the paper to the Farmers' Daily Journal. Josie Goodwin, a secretary in the cooperative, acquired a controlling interest in the paper and stayed on as publisher for 13 years. During her tenure, the Journal changed to afternoon delivery.

Goodwin sold the paper in 1933 to brothers W. Cliff McDowell and Jack S. McDowell, former owners of the Alameda Times-Star. The brothers switched circulation patterns once again, delivering in the morning to rural residents and in the afternoon for city subscribers. The paper was sold seven years later to nationally known sports writer Edward Frayne, and his wife, Vera, of New York City. Under the Fraynes' ownership, the Journal moved from South First Street to South Center and Crane. After a heart attack forced Edward Frayne into inactivity, the couple sold the paper to Lowell E. Jessen of Holtville, just two months before Pearl Harbor.

World War II saw the death of the morning edition of the Journal, due to paper rationing. In 1953, Jessen left Turlock to take over the Beverly Hills Citizen, purchased from Will Rogers Jr. He sold a 49 percent interest to Stanley T. Wilson, publisher of the Mill Valley Record, who then became editor and publisher of the Journal. Wilson later acquired a full 50 percent interest. Jessen returned in 1963 at his partner’s request and they shared the publishing responsibilities for the next two years, until the Journal was sold to Freedom Communications. In 1978, Jessen was posthumously inducted into the California Newspaper Hall of Fame.

The Journal was sold again in 1996 to Central Valley Publishing (later renamed Pacific-Sierra), beginning a series of ownership changes and budget cuts that accompanied a decline in circulation. In 2003, Pacific-Sierra head Anthony Allegretti lead a buyout to form a new company, MainStreet Media Group. Ultimately, after a sale to Morris Multimedia in 2004, the Journal switched to twice-weekly publication and refocused its coverage on community news. That same year former owner Wilson died, and in 2007 he was also inducted into the state newspaper hall of fame. In 2019, the newspaper moved offices to 121 S. Center St. In 2020, the Journal was sold to 209 Multimedia, owned by publisher Hank Vander Veen.

== Notable staff ==
- Leonard Wibberley, author of "The Mouse that Roared," worked briefly as a Turlock Journal reporter.
- Paul Stine, a victim of the Zodiac Killer, worked briefly as a Turlock Journal reporter in 1957 after graduating High School.
- Dave Meltzer, journalist and sports historian, best known as the publisher and editor of the Wrestling Observer Newsletter, worked briefly at the Turlock Journal as a sports writer.
