= El Sol de Salinas =

Newspaper published in Salinas

- Type: Twice-weekly
- Owner(s): Gannett
- Editor: Silas Lyon
- Founded: 1968; 57 years ago
- Language: Spanish
- Headquarters: 123 W Alisal St, Salinas, CA Monterey County United States
- Circulation: 13,000
- Website: elsoldesalinas.com

El Sol de Salinas is a paper focusing on news and information for Hispanic communities in the Monterey County, California area. It is printed twice weekly on Tuesdays and Saturdays. It has a circulation of 13,000 copies.

It is edited by Silas Lyon.

== History ==
El Sol de Salinas publishing on November 13, 1968, and it considered to be the oldest and largest Spanish weekly newspaper on California's central coast. The paper is produced by The Salinas Californian, and both papers are owned by the Gannett Company, which also owns the USA Today Network.

El Sol's parent company, Gannett, has been criticized for publishing content in local papers that was not relevant to those local communities, as a result of managing too many papers under one editorial structure. Much of El Sol's content is translated content from its parent newspaper, The Salinas Californian, rather than original content for the local Spanish-speaking communities.

El Sol is the paper of record for Spanish-language public notices from Monterey County, including Monterey's Treasurer-Tax Collector.

Valentin Mendoza, who had worked as editor of El Sol for many years, left in 2015.

In 2017, Silas Lyon was named Executive Editor over the north central team of California papers, which includes El Sol. Lyon's hiring, and the firing of previous editor Pete Wevurski, was part of a financial restructuring across the Gannett Company and included a number of other layoffs.
