= Tehachapi News =

Newspaper in Tehachapi, California, USA

- Type: Weekly newspaper
- Founder: C.A. Seay
- Managing editor: Christine Peterson
- Founded: 1900
- Language: English
- City: Tehachapi, California
- Country: United States
- Sister newspapers: Bakersfield Californian
- Website: tehachapinews.com

Tehachapi News is a weekly newspaper in Tehachapi, California.

== History ==
In 1900, C.A. Seay published the first edition of the Tehachapi Tomahawk in Tehachapi. After a few months he relocated the paper to Mojave. In June 1902, Charles Heath bought the Tomahawk and moved it back to Tehachapi. In March 1909, he leased the paper to Frank H. Boughton, who left suddenly after two months. Heath published the Tomahawk until September 1914 when it was sold to his son Erle Heath.

In June 1916, George W.B. Snell bought the paper. In May 1919, the Tomahawk briefly suspended publication but was revived by T.G. Nicklin. a month later the paper was acquired by F.A. Meyer and Merle D. Hurlbut. At that time the paper was renamed to the Tehachapi News. In June 1920, Erle Heath, son of Charles Heath, resumed editorship of the paper.

In February 1921, Archie J. Hicks, owner of the Palmdale Post, bought the News. He sold it in November 1927 to Wesley L. Davis Jr., who also owned The Mojave Record and The Randsburg Times. George R. Burris bought the company in March 1930, and sold it in July 1935 to Grove Wilson. Wilson grew ill around March 1943 and leased the News to Walter Johnson. Johnson published the paper until his death in June 1964. The business was then passed down to his two sons, Richard and Warren Johnson.

in May 1998, the owners of The Bakersfield Californian bought the Tehachapi News At the time the paper had a circulation of 8,000. In June 2019, the Harrell-Fritts family sold the two papers to Sound News Media.

== See also ==
- Newspapers published in California
