= Placerville Mountain Democrat =

Oldest continuous newspaper in California

- Type: Weekly newspaper
- Format: Broadsheet
- Owner(s): McNaughton Newspapers, Inc
- Founder(s): F.H. Harmon; Thomas A. Springer
- Publisher: Richard Esposito
- Founded: 1851 (as the El Dorado News)
- Language: English
- Headquarters: 2889 Ray Lawyer Drive, Placerville, CA 95667
- ISSN: 2693-3055
- OCLC number: 1180287029
- Website: mtdemocrat.com

The Placerville Mountain Democrat (known locally as the Mountain Democrat or simply the Democrat) is the newspaper of El Dorado County, California, based in Placerville and is the oldest continuously published newspaper in the State of California. The Democrat is owned by McNaughton Newspapers, Inc. The publisher is Richard Esposito and editor is Krysten Kellum.

== History ==
During the 1850s, newspapers in California's mining towns reported news from steamships as they docked in San Francisco, California, after travel around Cape Horn – "usually about six months old. But it was new news in the mines." The first newspaper published in El Dorado County was the El Dorado News in Coloma, California. It was founded in June 1851 by F.H. Harmon and Thomas A. Springer. The paper relocated to Hangtown (later renamed to Placerville) in December 1851. Springer later bought Harmon out and renamed the News to the El Dorado Republican in June 1853.

The first edition of The Empire County Argus was founded in Coloma on November 19, 1853. Daniel W. Gelwicks was editor and William A. January was a compositor. George Vincent succeeded Gelwicks as Argus publisher on January, 21, 1854. A month later Gelwicks bought the Republican from Springer and renamed it to the Mountain Democrat. Its first issue date was February 25, 1854. In 1889, the Weekly Observer merged with the Mountain Democrat.

State politician Gideon J. Carpenter acquired the paper at some point. He was a talented public speaker and a writer known for using the "keenest sarcasm." In 1903, he retired and was succeed as editor and publisher by his daughter Miss Mollie Carpenter. Miss Bine V. Ingham worked as business manager and Will O. Upton worked as foreman. Ingham later became co-owner. In 1910, G.J. Carpenter died. In 1921, co-owner Ingham died. In 1922, B.V. Carpenter and Ingham's estate sold the paper to Clarence E. Barker. In 1935, Barker bought the Placerville Republican and The Georgetown Gazette from H. Berle Thomas. The Gazette was quickly sold off to Jon Nicholl of Applegate. The Republican was merged into the Mountain Democrat.

In 1958, the Barker family bought the Placerville Times from Harvey McGee, former publisher of The Folsom Telegraph. The Times was then absorbed into the Mountain Democrat. In 1964, Barker's son's Robert and W. Stanley Barker sold the Mountain Democrat to McNaughton Newspapers, Inc., owners of the Daily Republic in Fairfield. C.E. Barker died a year later. In 1966, the McNaughton bought The Davis Enterprise, and a year later company co-owner John T. McNaughton died. In 2012, owner Dean McNaughton died.

== See also ==
- List of the oldest newspapers
