= Antelope Valley Press =

Newspaper in Palmdale, California

- Type: Daily newspaper
- Format: Broadsheet
- Owner(s): Antelope Valley Press, Inc.
- Founder: Archie J. Hick
- Publisher: Steven Malkowich
- President: Melanie Walsh
- Founded: April 3, 1915; 111 years ago (as the Palmdale Post)
- Language: English
- Headquarters: 37404 Sierra Highway; Palmdale, California
- Circulation: 17,836 daily 21,668 Sundays (as of 2011)
- ISSN: 0744-5830
- OCLC number: 8403932
- Website: avpress.com

The Antelope Valley Press, colloquially referred to as the Valley Press or AV Press by its staff and Antelope Valley residents, is a daily newspaper published in Palmdale, California. The paper covers Antelope Valley, Palmdale, Lancaster and adjacent areas of north Los Angeles and southeastern Kern counties, including Acton and Agua Dulce.

== History ==
On April 3, 1915, Archie J. Hicks published the first edition of the Palmdale Post. At the time, the Valley was home to about 3,500 people. In February 1921, Hicks bought the Tehachapi News. He sold the Post on June 17, 1922 to James E. Davis, who changed the name to the Palmdale Reporter. C.D. Williamson acquired the paper in June 1927 and renamed it to the South Antelope Valley Press.

In July 1929, Williamson sold the paper to R.B. Cameron and Paul Hubbard, owners of the Lancaster Ledger-Gazette. That October, Carl F. Blaker became a co-owner. Cameron and Hubbard sold their stake in March 1930 to Fred B. Hitchings. Blaker left that May after buying The Piru News. Hitchings sold the Press in 1935 to Henry L. Loft and went on to buy the Van Nuys Tribune. In 1948, John Hungerford, publisher of the Reseda News, purchased the Press from Lewis A. Reddell. At that time the paper's circulation was 1,200. A year later Charles B. Colby bought the paper and sold it in 1955 to James W. Metcalfe.

On 1958, a group of four businessmen bought the paper, then known as the Antelope Valley Press. The new owners were Arthur H. Folz, Lamont Odett, and brothers Maurice W. Markham and Ralph H. Markham. Folz and Odett were connected with the San Fernando Sun and Mission Publications. The Markham brothers owned The Van Nuys News and Valley Green Sheet. In 1961, Ralph Markham bought out his brother and Odett bought out Folz. The Odett family and Markham family then operated the paper together until 1994 when Richard Lamont Odett Jr. sold his company shares to William C. Markham. At that time the daily circulation was 60,000. On June 30, 2017, the Markham family sold the Press to Antelope Valley Press Inc., a newly created business led by Canadian newspaper executive Steven Malkowich.

== Sources ==
- Larsen, Lisa. "Antelope Valley Press buys complete system from DTI". Newspapers and Technology. Retrieved September 4, 2007.
- "Important Dates in Palmdale and Antelope Valley History". Palmdale City Library. Retrieved September 4, 2007.
- "Bill Mackenzie". Palmdale High School. Retrieved September 4, 2007.
