= Gardena Valley News =

Weekly newspaper in Gardena, California

- Type: Weekly newspaper
- Founder: H.C. Morrill
- Publisher: Alan Moskal
- Editor: Gary Kohatsu
- Founded: 1904 (as the Gardena Reporter)
- Language: English
- Headquarters: 15005 S. Vermont Ave., Gardena, CA 90247
- ISSN: 1930-9252
- OCLC number: 40197246
- Website: gardenavalleynews.org

The Gardena Valley News is a weekly newspaper published each Thursday. It serves the Gardena, California area, and has an estimated circulation of 10,000.

== History ==
In December 1905, the Gardena Reporter was founded by H.C. Morrill. It was a four-page paper which billed itself as an independent, with editor Morrill taking positions against the Republican party of which he was an officer. Morrill sold the Reporter to George G. Burns in February 1909 after his wife grew ill. Following Burns were several other owners including a Compton banker and Charlie Turner.

In 1914, Anthone H. Knutson succeeded K.T. Hubbell as editor. Bert Perrin bought the Reporter in 1924 and changed its name to the Gardena Valley News. He sold it in 1928 to Lew Guild and L.E. Gingery, two printing instructors at Gardena High School. Lew threw his support into the fight for the incorporation of Gardena, which was successful. In 1938, Guild expanded the paper by purchasing a semi-rotary Goss Comet press.

In 1946, Guild sold the paper to Amos H. Dow, a former Nevada publisher. Dow, a veteran, had been in poor health since being gassed in World War I. He died six weeks after the sale. His widow Agnes E. Dow then took ownership of the News, and acted as its publisher, editor and reporter. Around that time her brother George Donald Aglie joined her at the paper. In 1957, Mrs. Dow, who by then had remarried to Donavin Miller, sold the News to William J. Hunt, who previously worked as the advertising director at the Anchorage Daily News. Don Aglie remained on as co-publisher.

In 1965, Algie and Hunt bought the Gardena Tribune from Gerald T. Deal and Walter Hicks and merged it into their paper. The Tribune's archive was then donated to the Gardena Library. Hunt died in the 1970s. Agile was inducted into the Gardena Wall of Fame in 1997. The Valley News was acquired by brothers Edward and Daniel Verdugo in August 2005. Agile died in 2008. The GVN at some point became part of CommunityMedia Corp., which owned about 20 community weeklies. The paper launched a website in 2013.
