= Parlier Post =

Defunct newspaper published in Parlier, California

- Type: Weekly newspaper
- Founder: W. J. Anderson
- Publisher: Mid Valley Publishing, Inc.
- Founded: 1952
- Ceased publication: 2018
- Relaunched: 1981
- Language: English
- OCLC number: 38869686

The Parlier Post was a newspaper published in Parlier, California, from 1952 to 2018.

== History ==
On September 18, 1952, W. J. Anderson, owner of the Orange Cove News, published the first weekly edition of the Parlier Post.

Edwin A. Davis, former owner of the Tule Lake Reporter, was named editor in October 1953, and a month later Anderson sold the Post and the News to James W. Fairweather, owner of the Reedley Exponent. In January 1958, the paper ceased.

On May 1, 1981, the Parlier Post was revived with Marcos Casarez as editor. In November 2002, two armed men robbed the paper's office and took off with $3,000 in cash and mostly blank money orders.

Mid Valley Publishing ceased publication of the Post on January 24, 2018, due to rising costs.
