= Inyo Register =

Newspaper published in Bishop, California

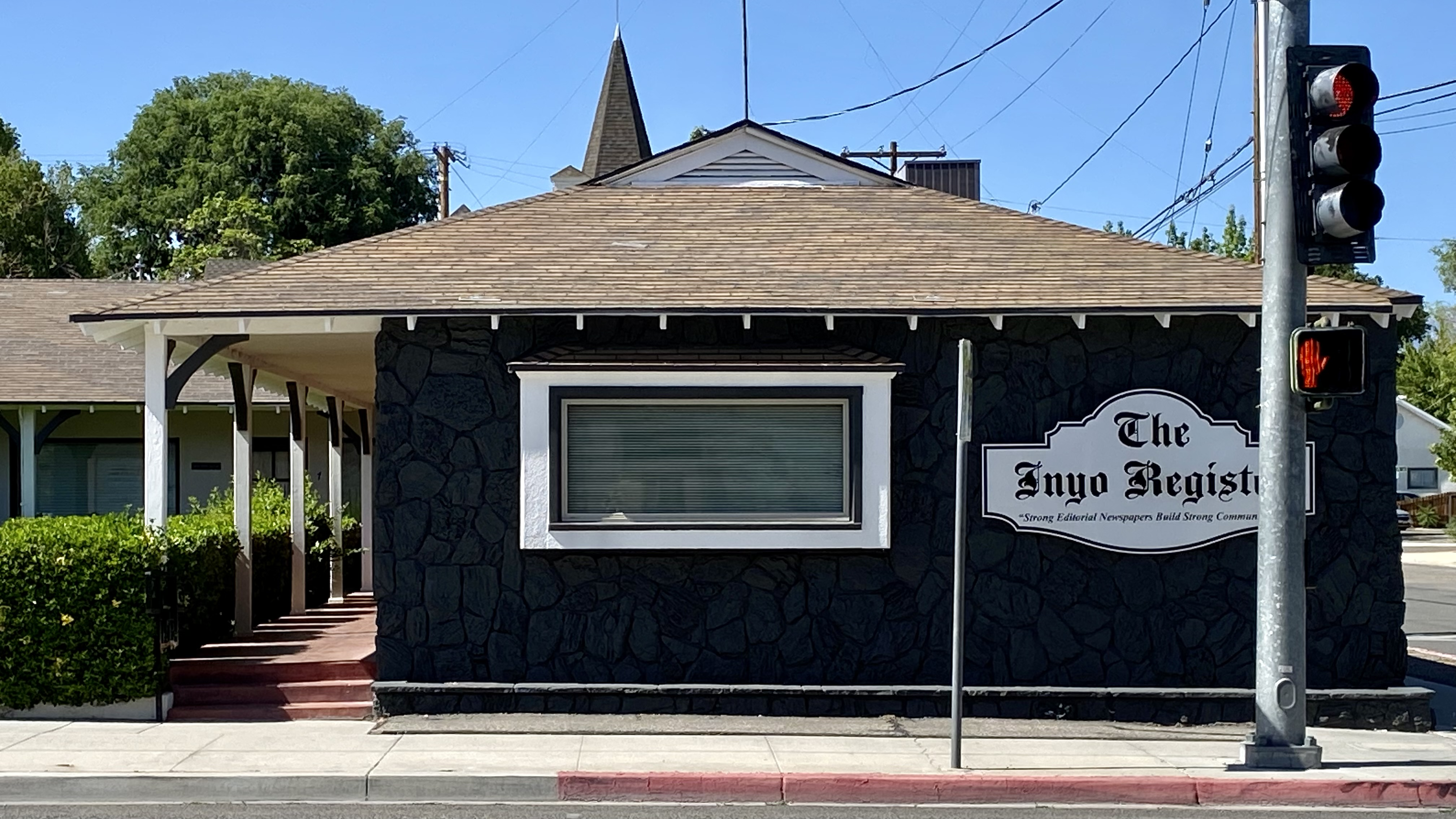
- Inyo Register office, Bishop, California
- Type: Newspaper
- Owner(s): Horizon Publications, Inc.
- Founder: Pleasant Arthur Chalfant
- Founded: 1885
- Language: English
- Headquarters: 407 W. Line St. #8; Bishop, CA 93514
- Sister newspapers: Mammoth Times
- ISSN: 1095-5089
- Website: inyoregister.com

The Inyo Register is a community newspaper published three times a week in Bishop, Inyo County, California, United States. The Inyo Register was founded in 1885 as Bishop's first paper.

== History ==
The Inyo Independent of Independence was first published on July 9, 1870, by Pleasant Arthur Chalfant and James E. Parker. Chalfant left the paper in 1881. Years later P.A. Chalfant established another paper called the Inyo Register of Bishop. The first issue was published on April 4, 1885.

P. A. Chalfant handed down the newspaper to his son William Arthur "Bill" Chalfant, who ran it for 56 years until selling the paper in January 1942. The new owners were George W. Savage and Roy L. French, who owned the Inyo Independent and the Owens Valley Progress-Citizen of Lone Pine. The three papers would be managed by a newly created company called Chalfant Press, Inc.

Todd Watkins and Owen F. Cooper were also part of the new ownership group, and operated Chalfant Press for about 40 years. In February 1983, Watkins and Cooper sold the business to brothers Deane Funk and Ron Funk. At that time Chalfant Press also published the Mono Herald of Mammoth Lakes. The Funk family merged the company with their own, Prospector Publishing, Inc. of Carson City. The Funks also owned the Santa Monica Evening Outlook, which they sold along with seven weekly papers to Copley Press in March 1983. Later that year they bought The Review of June Lake. In July 1984, The Review was merged with the Mono Herald. In 1991, Bill Chalfant was posthumously inducted into the California Newspaper Hall of Fame.

In June 1996, the Funk brothers sold the Inyo Register and The Review-Herald to the Register Review Publishing Company, which was owned by Edward W. Scripps III, who previously worked for the Scripps League Newspapers. At that time Jay Byrne was named publisher. In February 1999, Register Review Publishing Company, including The Maui Bulletin of Hawaii, was acquired by American Publishing Company, a subsidiary of Hollinger Inc. In October 1999, American Publishing purchased the Mammoth Times, and a month assimilated The Review-Herald into the Times. In August 2000, the company sold the Register and Times to Horizon Publications, Inc. In 2023, former Register owner George W. Savage was posthumously inducted into the California Newspaper Hall of Fame.
