= Upland News =

Newspaper in Upland, California (1901–1974)

- Type: Weekly newspaper
- Founder: Walter Curtis Westland
- Founded: 1901
- Ceased publication: 1974
- Language: English
- City: Upland, California
- OCLC number: 31761247

The Upland News was a weekly or semiweekly newspaper circulated in Upland, California, between 1901 and 1974.

== History ==
Ella L. Westland, upon her marriage to J.N. Beaubier in 1916

In June 1901, Walter Curtis Westland acquired the Valley Mirror and the Sentinel, and then merged the two together to form the North Ontario News. The printing plant consisted of a Washington hand press and other man-powered machinery in a house on A Street Upland, but within a year a new building was constructed for it.

Westland came to California from Michigan where he operated the Grand Lodge Independent. He died of consumption on December 1, 1902. His widow Ella L. Westland and their son W.E. Westland then conducted the paper, at some point renamed to The Upland News. In 1908, W.E. Westland purchased The Highland Messenger. Three years later he bought out his mother from the News in December 1910.

The newspaper office was considerably damaged by water after a fire swept through Upland's downtown district in December 1912. The News increased its publication frequency from weekly to semiweekly starting in December 1919. In January 1928, the News was sold to J.B. Hungerford and his son, John Hungerford, both of Carroll, Iowa. They moved to California to take over management. Under them, the paper reverted to a weekly.

Richard T. Baldwin, of Albion, Michigan, previously connected with the Albion Evening Recorder, bought the paper in June 1928. Baldwin sold the paper to Vernon Paine and Harry M. Guy in June 1929. Paine was the paper's advertising manager and Guy previously operated the paper for three months. That September, the News was expanded again to a semi-weekly.

Guy retired in September 1939 and sold his interest to Paine, who later increased the rate of publication from twice to three times a week. Paine acquired the Ontario Herald from A.Q. Miller in March 1947. He then merged his two papers to form a daily edition published five times a week called the Daily News-Herald. It was franchise of the Associated Press. A weekly continued to be published under the Ontario Herald masthead.

In October 1948, Paine sold the Upland News-Herald to A.E. and Helen C. Dickerson of Compton, and Geraldine C. Preston of Santa Monica. In February 1949, W. Patrick McDonald acquired the paper. Three former employees sued him for unpaid wages, but settled out of court. Around that time the federal government placed four tax liens on McDonald for unpaid taxes. In February 1950, McDonald suspended the News-Herald and relaunched it as a weekly under the old name.

Paine resumed ownership of the Upland News in July 1950. He operated it for another eight years until it was sold to Mel Hodell in October 1958. Two years later Hodell acquired the Montclair Tribune. Hodell established the Cucamonga News in December 1961. He sold his three papers in July 1967 to Bonita Publishing Company, a subsidiary of the Pomona Progress Bulletin. Later that year the company was sold to Donrey Media. In 1974, the Upland News ceased publication, followed by the Montclair Tribune in 1977. The Cucamonga News was subsumed by the Highlander, which discontinued publication in the 1990s. The News, Tribune and Highlander were folded into the Inland Valley Daily Bulletin.
