= Palo Alto Weekly =

Newspaper in Palo Alto, California

- Type: Weekly newspaper
- Format: Tabloid
- Owner: Embarcadero Media Foundation
- Publisher: Adam Dawes
- Founded: 1979
- Headquarters: 2345 Yale St., FL. 1., Palo Alto, California
- Website: www.paloaltoonline.com

The Palo Alto Weekly is a weekly community newspaper in Palo Alto in the U.S. state of California. Owned by Embarcadero Media Foundation, formerly Embarcadero Media, it serves Palo Alto, Menlo Park, Atherton, Portola Valley, Stanford, East Palo Alto and Los Altos Hills.

It was established in 1979 as an alternative to the town's daily newspaper, the Peninsula Times Tribune, which ceased publishing in 1993. At that time, the Weekly expanded to twice-a-week. In 1995, a new daily, the Palo Alto Daily News, began publishing. In 2008, a second daily, The Daily Post, began in Palo Alto. In September 2009, the Weekly reverted to publishing just one day a week, on Fridays.

The Weekly is published by Embarcadero Media Foundation. Sarah Wright became editor in 2024 succeeding Jocelyn Dong, who became editor in 2011. In January 1994, the newspaper began to publish all its content on its website called Palo Alto Online under the technical direction of Frank Bravo. The website includes a classified advertising section shared among Embarcadero's other publications, and the newspaper is distributed free by mail to many households in its market area, with a circulation of approximately 37,000. It is a member of the Association of Alternative Newsweeklies.
