= The Davis Enterprise =

- Type: Twice-weekly newspaper
- Owner: McNaughton Newspapers
- Founder: Louis A. Eichler
- Editor: Sebastian Oñate
- Founded: 1897
- Language: English
- Headquarters: 325 G Street, Davis, California 95616
- Sister newspapers: Daily Republic
- OCLC number: 26709961
- Website: davisenterprise.com

The Davis Enterprise is a twice-weekly newspaper published in Davis, California.

== History ==
In December 1897, Louis A. Eichler established The Davisville Enterprise. He was succeeded by William H. Scott in September 1899. Scott changed the paper's name in April 1907 to The Davis Enterprise. He published the paper for 36 years until selling it to Chelso A. Maghetti in March 1935. Douglas and Mary Tibbitts purchased the Enterprise from Maghetti in December 1954 after he was appointed sectary of the state highway commission.

By August 1966, the couple owned the Enterprise, The Woodland Record and East Yolo Record. It was at that time they merged their company with McNaughton Newspapers and became junior partners in the new business. A year later the Tibbitts sued the company for closing The Woodland Record and selling East Yolo Record, which they claimed the McNaughton family said wouldn't happen during the merger negotiations. Around that time co-owner John T. McNaughton died. Suburban Newspapers, Inc., who had purchased the Woodland paper, sued the Tibbitts for $120,000 in damages (equivalent to $1,158,683 in 2025).

In 2012, company founder Dean McNaughton died. In 2015, the Enterprise closed its printing press in Davis and switched to using the press of the Daily Republic in Fairfield, also owned by McNaughton Newspapers. In 2025, the paper reduced its print schedule from three to two days a week. That same year, the Enterprise laid off popular columnist Bob Dunning, who had been at the paper nearly 55 years. Freelance business columnist Wendy Weitzel cut ties with the paper in protest. The two then each launched successful Substack newsletters.
