= The Almanac (Menlo Park) =

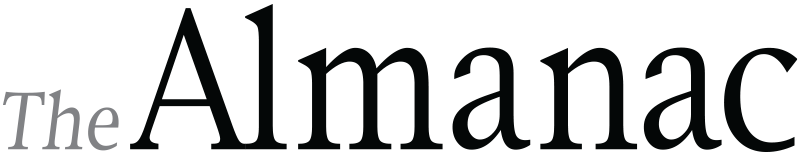
- Type: Weekly newspaper
- Owner: Embarcadero Media
- Publisher: Adam Dawes
- Staff writers: Arden Margulis, Jennifer Yoshikoshi
- Founded: 1965
- Headquarters: 3525 Alameda de las Pulgas, Menlo Park
- ISSN: 1097-3095
- Website: www.almanacnews.com

The Almanac is a weekly California newspaper published to about 15,000 print readers across Menlo Park, Atherton, Portola Valley and Woodside.

Its weekly edition goes out on Fridays and is accessible via newspaper boxes in its coverage area and is mailed out to members.

The Almanac publishes community news, local news and investigative pieces along with entertainment and food journalism through the Six Fifty and Peninsula Foodist.

== History ==
The paper was founded in 1965 by Jean Heflin, Betty Fry and Hedy Boissevain; it was originally titled The Country Almanac. During the 1970s, Elaine Levine bought her partners' shares in The Country Almanac. In 1985, Levine bought the Menlo Park Recorder, thus expanding the circulation and changing the name to The Almanac.

Embarcadero Pub. Co. bought The Almanac in 1993. Embarcadero Publishing became a nonprofit in 2024.

== Hacking incident ==
On September 17, 2015 at 10:30 p.m., The Almanac's website in addition to other Embarcadero Media websites paloaltoonline.com, mv-voice.com, almanacnews.com, pleasantonweekly.com and danvillesanramon.com were hacked and replaced with a message purporting to be from the hacking group Anonymous that said:

Greetings, This site has been hacked.

Embarcadero Media Group (Almanac) has failed to remove content that has been harmful to the wellbeing and safety of others.

Failure to honor all requests to remove content will lead to the permanent shutdown of all Embarcadero Media Group Websites.

We do not forgive, we do not forget, we are legion.

The last line is a reference to a tagline commonly used by the hacking group. The sites were taken down by the company and restored the following evening.

A two-year FBI investigation into the incident later found that Richmond resident Ross M. Colby, 35, was behind the hack. A jury convicted Colby of all charges on June 6, 2018 after a six-day trial. It came out during the trial that Colby admitted in an interview with the FBI he hacked the company's sites and claimed it was at the request of convicted felon and former Menlo Park resident, Hiruy Amanuel, who was sentenced to 21 months in prison for federal drug-trafficking charges in 2009.

The Almanac had written two stories in 2013 about a lawsuit Amanuel filed against Menlo Park for violating his civil rights. Both articles mentioned his previous convictions. Amanuel received $500 from the city of Menlo Park and his attorney recovered $49,400 to settle his lawsuit. While Embarcadero Media previously thought none of its websites were altered, it learned during Colby's trial that both Almanac articles were modified and was able to restore the articles.

The FBI did not believe Colby's claims and Amanuel, who had moved to Ethiopia, denied being involved. The FBI did not look into Amanuel and never contacted him. U.S. District Court Judge Lucy Koh, who was overseeing Colby's trial and Embarcadero Media publisher Bill Johnson both criticized the FBI during his sentencing for not investigating Colby's claims. Colby's sentencing was delayed due to doubts over his mental competency.

In his statement after Colby's conviction, Johnson said that while the hack effected the company significantly, he hoped the court with sentence Colby to time served since he had been in prison for six months and had Lyme disease, which required complicated drug treatments. Koh agreed and Colby served no additional prison time but had to submit to electronic monitoring. He also had to pay $27,000 in restitution.

== Awards and recognition ==
In 1995 The Country Almanac of Menlo Park was awarded for general excellence by the California Newspapers Publishers Association. The mayor of the City of Menlo Park honored Tom Gibboney, the paper's publisher and editor for 21 years, for multiple accomplishments on his retirement from the paper in 2014.

In 2024, The Almanac won eight awards from the California News Publishers Association.

== Editors ==
- 2023-2025: Angela Swartz
- 2020-2023: Andrea Gemmet
- 2018-2020: Renee Batti
- 1993-2014: Tom Gibboney

== Reporters ==
- Education reporter since 2024: Jennifer Yoshikoshi
- Atherton and Menlo Park reporter since 2025: Arden Margulis
