= Auburn Journal =

Newspaper published in Auburn, California

The Auburn Journal
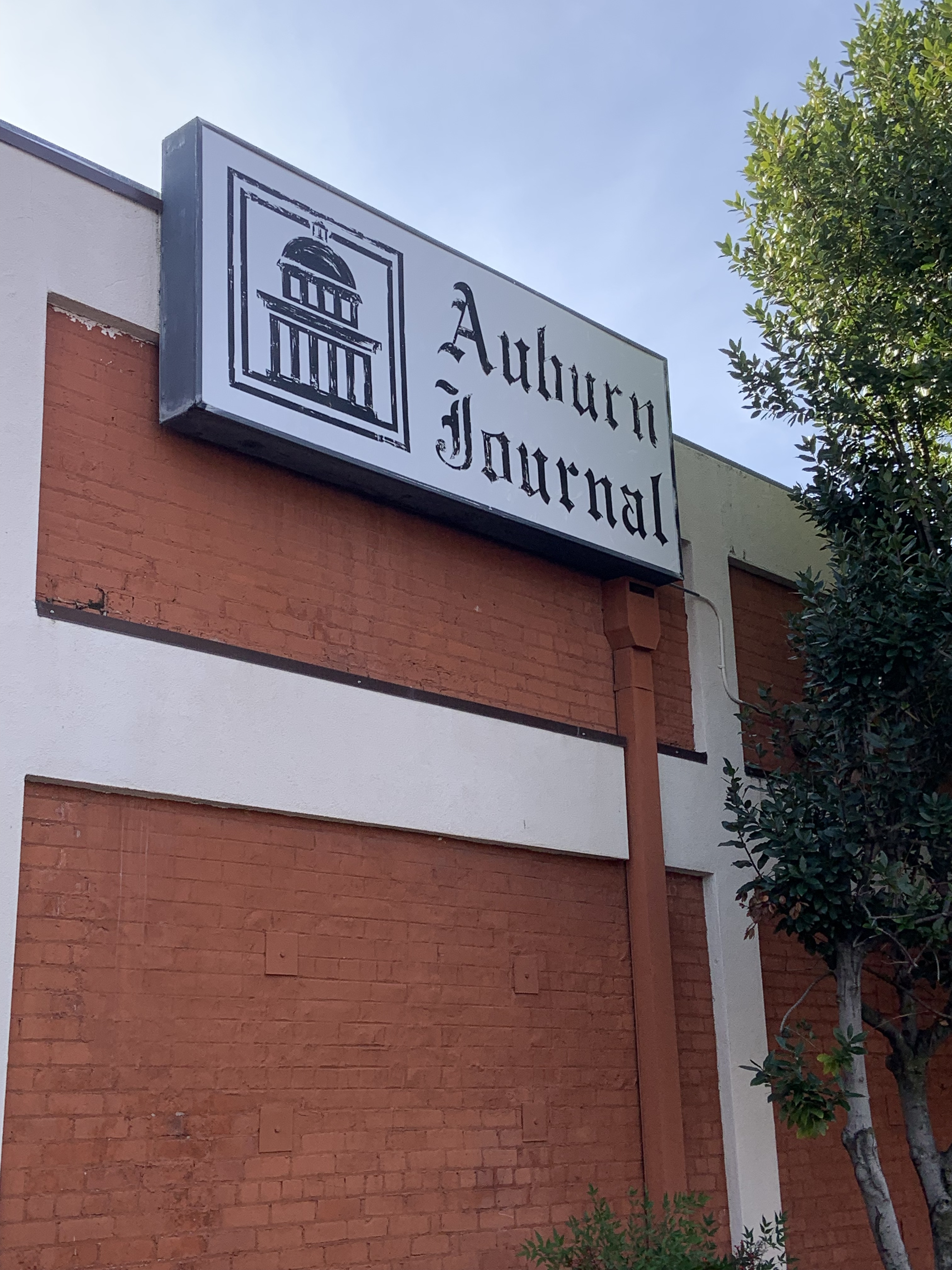
- Type: Twice weekly newspaper
- Owner: Alta Newspaper Group
- Founder: James B. McQuillan
- Publisher: John Love
- Editor: Bill Poindexter
- Founded: 1872 (as the Placer Weekly Argus)
- Language: English
- Headquarters: 1030 High Street, Auburn, California, United States
- Circulation: 9,486 weekdays 9,600 Sundays (as of 2011)
- OCLC number: 28239891
- Website: auburnjournal.com

The Auburn Journal is a newspaper based in Auburn, California.

== History ==
In 1872, The Placer Weekly Argus was founded in Auburn. The weekly newspaper was Republican affiliated and edited by James B. McQuillan. McQuillan, known as "Mac," was wounded in expedition of William Walker to Baja California and Sonora and edited several California papers including the Vallejo Recorder. He died in 1874.

In 1877, Jacob H. Neff and Mr. Griffith took control of the Argus, with W. N. Slocum succeeding Thomas Glancey as editor. At the time the paper was owned by several local Republicans. The change was enacted after the paper published an editorial denouncing the Compromise of 1877 pursued by President Rutherford B. Hayes.

On Jan. 25, 1879, District Attorney W.H. Bullock, a Democrat, shot at and wounded Argus publisher H. W. Fenton due to an article critical of the Bullock. The inciting incident was an editorial saying Bullock would run for county judge, adding "Heaven save the mark!" The bullet missed Fenton's head but the powder burns damaged his face and an eye. The first trial was a hung jury and at the second hearing Bullock took a plea deal and was sentenced for assault with a deadly weapon instead of attempt of murder. Bullock then paid a $400 fine.

In 1880, Francis M. Millikan founded the Placer County Republican. In 1898, Republican editor F. A. Stuart retired and the paper was merged with the Placer County Argus to form the Argus-Republican, operated by Millikan and Richmond. That same year, Fellows and Rodehaver founded the Placer County Leader. In 1903, W. W. H. Fellows and T.W. Fitzsimmons sold the Placer County Leader to Francis M. Millikan, owner of the Placer County Republican. The Leader was founded five years earlier and subsequently absorbed into the Republican, which was the successor to the Argus.

In July 1914, L.A.P. Eichler, who formerly worked at The Sacramento Bee, founded the Auburn Daily Journal. In July 1918, Eichler purchased the Republican from Mrs. Fannie M. Wills and absorbed it into the Journal. In March 1919, Bert Alford Cassidy, owner of the Truckee Republican, took ownership of the Auburn Journal from Eichler. Cassidy edited the paper for 31 years until his sudden death from a heart attack in 1950. His widow Mrs. Jane M. Cassidy sold their controlling interest in the business in December 1965 to W. J. McGiffin Newspapers Inc. In 1982, the company's name was changed to Brehm Communications. Around 2019, the Colfax Record was absorbed into the Journal. In December 2022, the Journal was one of six newspapers published by Gold Country Media, a subsidiary of Brehm, sold to Gold Mountain Media, a subsidiary of Alta Newspaper Group.

== Other publications ==
Gold Country Media also publishes:

- Colfax Record, Colfax (weekly)
- The Press-Tribune, Roseville (weekly)
- The Folsom Telegraph, Folsom (weekly)
- The Placer Herald, Rocklin (weekly)
- Lincoln News Messenger, Lincoln (weekly)
- The Loomis News, Loomis (weekly)
