= East County News =

American weekly newspaper in Brentwood, California

- The June 27, 2014 front page of the Brentwood News
- Type: Weekly newspaper
- Format: Broadsheet
- Owner: Bay Area News Group (Digital First Media)
- Founder: J.B. Dickson
- Publisher: Sharon Ryan
- Managing editor: Judith Prieve
- Founded: June 26, 1914; 112 years ago
- Language: English
- Headquarters: 2121 N. California Blvd, Suite 290, Walnut Creek, California 94596 U.S.
- Circulation: 3,500 (as of 1998)
- Website: www.eastbaytimes.com/location/brentwood/

The East County News was a weekly newspaper based in Brentwood, California, United States. It was published by the Bay Area News Group (BANG), a subsidiary of MediaNews Group. Founded in 1914 as the Brentwood News, the newspaper currently publishes an edition every Friday as weekly community supplements of the East Bay Times.

== History ==
On June 26, 1914, J.B. Dickson, formerly of the Manteca Enterprise, published the first edition of the Brentwood News in Brentwood, California. That November, Dickson sold the paper to Richard S. Holden, who installed Charles W. Downs as editor. In March 1915, Holden expanded the News to an 8-page, 5-column weekly. At that time J.J. McCulloch was editor.

The News was acquired by E.L. Kynoch, principal of the Fairfield grammar school, in December 1918, followed by Sam Hill in June 1920. Hill remained at the newspaper for 11 years. In January 1931, Edgar M. Allen and Ross Draper purchased the newspaper from Hill, and Allen bought out Draper later that year. In 1950, The Brentwood News building at 654 3rd Street was built under Allen's ownership.

Allen published the paper for almost 25 years. In June 1955, he sold it to Loyal F. Bisby, of Oakland, for $35,000. In March 1957, Gentry Durham, city editor of the Antioch Ledger, bought the News. John C. Henderson bought the paper some time in 1965. He soon sold it in May 1966 to Ernest Y. Cox, assistant to Rep. John E. Moss. In January 1969, William H. Brewer became the owner. At that time circulation was 1,450.

In 1971, Thomas F. and Samuel H. Mathews, owners of the Tracy Press, purchased the News. The next year in 1972, Bethel Island’s Bob Gromm become News managing editor. In 1986, Dean Lesher, owner of Contra Costa Times and Daily Ledger, purchased the News from the Mathews. After the acquisition, Gromm remained as a columnist until 1989, when he was retired. On May 13, 1993, Lesher died at age 89. Two years later his widow sold Lesher Communications to the Knight Ridder newspaper chain for $360 million on August 29, 1995. The sale included the Brentwood News.

On August 10, 1998, the Brentwood News was temporarily moved from 654 3rd Street to 1650 Cavallo Road in Antioch, which was the Ledger Dispatch's Headquarters. This was due to issues with the building such as the cramped parking lot, which was too cramped and unsafe. On October 1, 1998, the newspaper moved from twice-weekly publication on Tuesdays and Fridays to once-weekly on Thursdays, and will be delivered with the Ledger Dispatch and the Contra Costa Times.

In September 1999, Ed Diokno replaced Katharine Ball as a city editor for the News. One of the first tasks at hand is to find a new office in Brentwood. In December 1999, the News moved back to Brentwood at 1185 2nd Street, Suite H1, in the Brentwood TownCentre. On January 14, 2000, the newspaper moved again from Thursday publication back to Friday. In mid-January 2001, the Contra Costa Newspapers sold Brentwood News' old offices at 654 3rd Street to Thomas B. Miller.

== See also ==
- Antioch Daily Ledger
