= The Loomis News =

Weekly newspaper published in Loomis, California

- Type: Weekly newspaper
- Owner: Alta Newspaper Group
- Founder: Paul Sagaser
- Publisher: John Love
- Editor: Bill Poindexter
- Founded: 1940
- Language: English
- City: Loomis, California
- Website: theloomisnews.com

The Loomis News is a weekly newspaper published in Loomis, California.

== History ==
In December 1940, Thomas "Paul" Sagaser acquired a linotype machine and two presses from Fall River Mills and used them to publish the first edition of The Loomis News out of the office of the defunct Loomis Recorder. Three decades later Sagaser sold the paper to Raymond "Bud" Pisarek, owner of the Colfax Record, in 1972. At that time the News had a circulation of 500.

Pisarek previously operated the Brookings Harbor-Pilot and at one time worked at The Placer Herald. In 1974, newspaper's founder Sagaser died. That same year Pisarek sold the News to Charles "Chuck" Slater, who sold it in July 1975 to husband-and-wife Ben D. and Carmela Martin of Penryn, owners of the Lincoln News Messenger. Mrs. Martin was publisher of The Roseville Press Tribune, which the couple co-owned.

In 1975, Pisarek sold the Record, and in 1980 the Martins sold the News Messenger. Pisarek was elected to the Auburn city council and became mayor in 1983. He bought the News back from the Martins in May 1988. At that time the paper had a circulation around 1,100. Pisarek also published a newspaper for artists called WestArt. In August 1989, Pisarek sold the News to Carlon Perry, of Manteca, who previously owned the Colusa County Sun-Herald and Williams Farmer.

In 1994, Pisarek lost out to a fourth term on the Auburn city council by 180 votes. He then focused on drawing his daily newspaper cartoon strip and became a moderator on a weekly radio talk show. Around that time Pisarek bought back the Loomis News for a third time. In 2002, Pisarek got into a dispute with the Loomis Basin Chamber of Commerce. Pisarek demanded the chamber pull its advertising from The Placer Herald of Rocklin, a rival out-of-town paper. After the chamber refused, Pisarek published multiple columns in the News criticizing the chamber. In response, the chamber ended its decade-old office subleasing agreement with the News, forcing the paper to find a new home.

In 2004, Pisarek sold the News again, this time to Gold County Media, a subsidiary of Brehm Communications. In December 2022, the News was one of six newspapers Brehm sold to Gold Mountain Media, a subsidiary of Alta Newspaper Group.
