= River Oaks Elementary School =

There are several schools named River Oaks Elementary School

- River Oaks Elementary School (Houston), Texas
- River Oaks Elementary School, part of Pflugerville Independent School District in Austin, Texas
- River Oaks Elementary School, part of Galt Joint Union Elementary School District in Galt, California
- River Oaks Elementary School, part of Dearborn Public Schools in Dearborn Heights, Michigan
- River Oaks Elementary School, part of Prince William County Public Schools in the Woodbridge CDP of Prince William County, Virginia
