= The Folsom Telegraph =

Newspaper published in Folsom, California

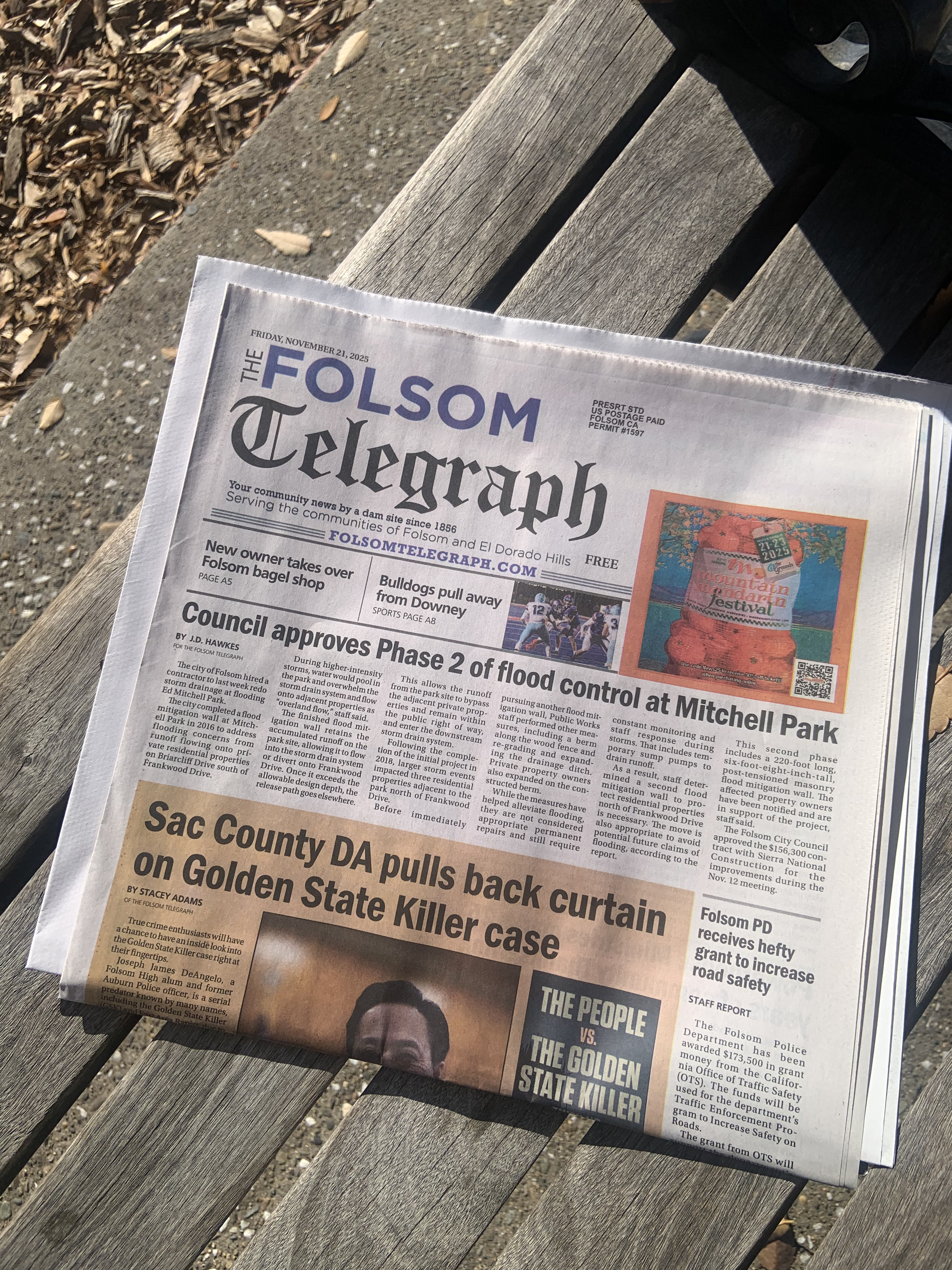
- An edition of The Folsom Telegraph published on Friday, November 21, 2025.
- Type: Weekly newspaper
- Owner: Alta Newspaper Group
- Founder(s): William M. Penry; Charles Killmer
- Publisher: John Love
- Editor: Bill Poindexter
- Founded: 1860
- Language: English
- City: Folsom, California
- OCLC number: 31018417
- Website: folsomtelegraph.com

The Folsom Telegraph is a weekly newspaper in Folsom, California.

== History ==
Four months after the Granite City Journal ceased, Carpenter & Wellington bought the printing plant and used it to publish the first issue of the Folsom Dispatch on April 4, 1857. The paper was politically independent, but after Carpenter left, Wellington aligned with the Chivalry Democrats, the Southern wing of the state's Democratic Party. On July 14, 1858, William M. Penry bought the paper an appointed William Ewing as editor.

In December 1858, Penry sold the Dispatch to Thomas Mooney, who renamed it to Mooney's Folsom and Placerville Express. Mooney was an eccentric and proud Irishman. In the paper, he published his own version of Irish history and advocated for fanciful schemes that were gossiped about in other mining town newspapers. For example, he once proposed starting a camel caravan company for the "myriads" of Irishmen immigrating to the Pacific Coast, allowing them to bypass steamship companies. In early 1860, Mooney relocated to San Francisco and started a new paper in that city, called Mooney's Express.

On July 3, 1860, Penry started a new semi-weekly paper in Folsom with Charles Killmer called the Folsom Telegraph. Penry sold his stake in the paper in July 1861 to O.D. Avaline, who formerly owned the Amador Sentinel in Jackson. Penry went on to co-own Amador Dispatch in Jackson. That paper was suppressed during the American Civil War and Penry was incarcerated at Fort Alcatraz for more than a month because of his political views and for expressing pleasure over the assassination of Abraham Lincoln.

Killmer worked with Avaline until leaving the Telegraph in December 1861. Avaline continued publishing the paper until enlisting in the Union army. The Folsom was then published by Avaline's wife with help from attorney Peter J. Hopper. Avaline died in December 1863. Mrs. Avaline sold the paper to Hopper in 1864 and it was then changed from a semi-weekly to a weekly. Hopper sought to boost the local economy with his publication. As gold mining declined, he advocated for the construction of the Folsom State Prison. Hopper is credited with helping bring the prison to the city. Hopper operated the paper for over decade and leased it in 1874 to John F. Howe who soon died. His widow then operated the paper and was one of four women in California at that time to edit or publish a newspaper. In 1875, W.W. Light bought the paper and continued to leased it to Mrs. Howe. At some point she became the owner and sold the paper in July 1884 to Weston P. Truesdell. Issac Fiel bought in as a co-owner in August 1888 and then became the sole owner in March 1889.

In May 1889, Thaddeus J. McFarland, formerly of the Wheatland Graphic, purchased the Folsom Telegraph. He published the paper until his death in May 1896. He was succeeded by his son Ray D. McFarland. The McFarland continued publishing the paper until Miss Hazel McFarland sold it in March 1942 to Edward M. Shirton. In February 1946, he was succeeded by Ralph Van Camp and Marc M. Schowalter. Schowalter sold out in August 1947 and Van Camp sold the paper to J. Ross Bahrs in March 1948 in order to take a job in the advertisement department at The Sacramento Bee. In January 1949, the Telegraph was bought by J. Boyce "Jim" Smith followed by Harvey C. McGee in April 1950. McGee sold the paper in June 1954 to Robert Finley, former production manager of The Press Democrat. Under him, the paper's slogan was "All The News By a Damsite," in reference to the Folsom Dam.

Finely sold the paper in March 1957 to Orville A. Wegat and Milton P. Kjer. Wegat was a former printer at The Galt Herald and Kjer was former publisher of the Lake County Bee. Wegat sold out to Kjer in 1961. J. Clifton Toney, former owner of The Solano Republican, bought the Telegraph and Orangevale News in January 1962. John P. McGoff, publisher of The Sacramento Union, bought the Telegraph and News from Toney in February 1976. At that time the Telegraph had a circulation of 2,000 and the News had a press run of 7,350. The papers were to be managed by the Sacramento Suburban Newspapers, which operated 10 suburban "Green Sheet" papers in Sacramento and Yolo counties.

In February 1982, Foothill Communications Corporation bought the Telegraph and News. Chris E. Hester was the majority share owner and Edward R. Padilla owned a minority stake. In November 1983, Padilla bought the Telegraph and News from the company. He sold both papers in March 1989 to Lesher Communications, Inc. for $1.6 million. The company had recently purchased the nearby Roseville Press-Tribune. In October 1995, Lesher sold those three papers to Brehm Communications of San Diego. In December 2022, the Telegraph was one of six newspapers published by Gold Country Media, a subsidiary of Brehm, sold to Gold Mountain Media, a subsidiary of Alta Newspaper Group.
