= All American Speedway =

Motorsport track in the United States

- Location: 800 All America City Boulevard; Roseville, California, United States; 95678
- Coordinates: 38°45′26.27″N 121°17′28.04″W
- Capacity: 4,000
- Owner: County of Placer (1955–present)
- Operator: Tim Huddleston (2024–present)
- Opened: May 29, 1955; 71 years ago
- Former names: Placer County Speedway (1986–1989); Roseville Speedway (1955–1970)
- Major events: Current: ARCA Menards Series West; NAPA Auto Parts 150 (1977–1979, 1981–1982, 2008–present); Former: NASCAR Southwest Series (1986–1990)
- Website: allamericanspeedway.com

Oval (2007–present)
- Surface: Asphalt
- Length: 0.333 mi (0.536 km)
- Turns: 4
- Banking: Turns 1–2: 8° Turns 3–4: 10-14°

Original Paved Oval (1970–2007)
- Surface: Asphalt
- Length: 0.250 mi (0.402 km)
- Turns: 4

All American Speedway (formerly known as the Roseville Speedway from 1955 to 1970 and as the Placer County Speedway from 1986 to 1989) is a 0.333 mi (0.536 km) oval short track in Roseville, California, United States. The facility has hosted a variety of events since its opening in 1955, including NASCAR-sanctioned and CARS Tour West events. All American Speedway is owned by the County of Placer as part of the county's fairground area known as @the Grounds, and operated by track promoter Tim Huddleston.

Originally built and sponsored by the Roseville Firemen's Association, All American Speedway opened on May 29, 1955, as a 1/4 mi (0.40 km) dirt oval as part of an addition to the Placer County Fairgrounds. In 1970, the track was paved and rebranded to its current name under the operational control of promoters Larry Burton and Bruno Romani. The track was ran and promoted by Burton until 1982, who afterward failed to build a track planned as a replacement for All American Speedway. Under the control of the Placer County Fair, which took over control in 1986, All American Speedway underwent several renovations, including a track reconfiguration in 2007. In 2018, control of the track was taken over by motorsports team owner Bill McAnally after the control of the fairgrounds itself was taken by Placer Valley Tourism, holding the position for six years before Tim Huddleston took over the position.

== Description ==
=== Configuration ===
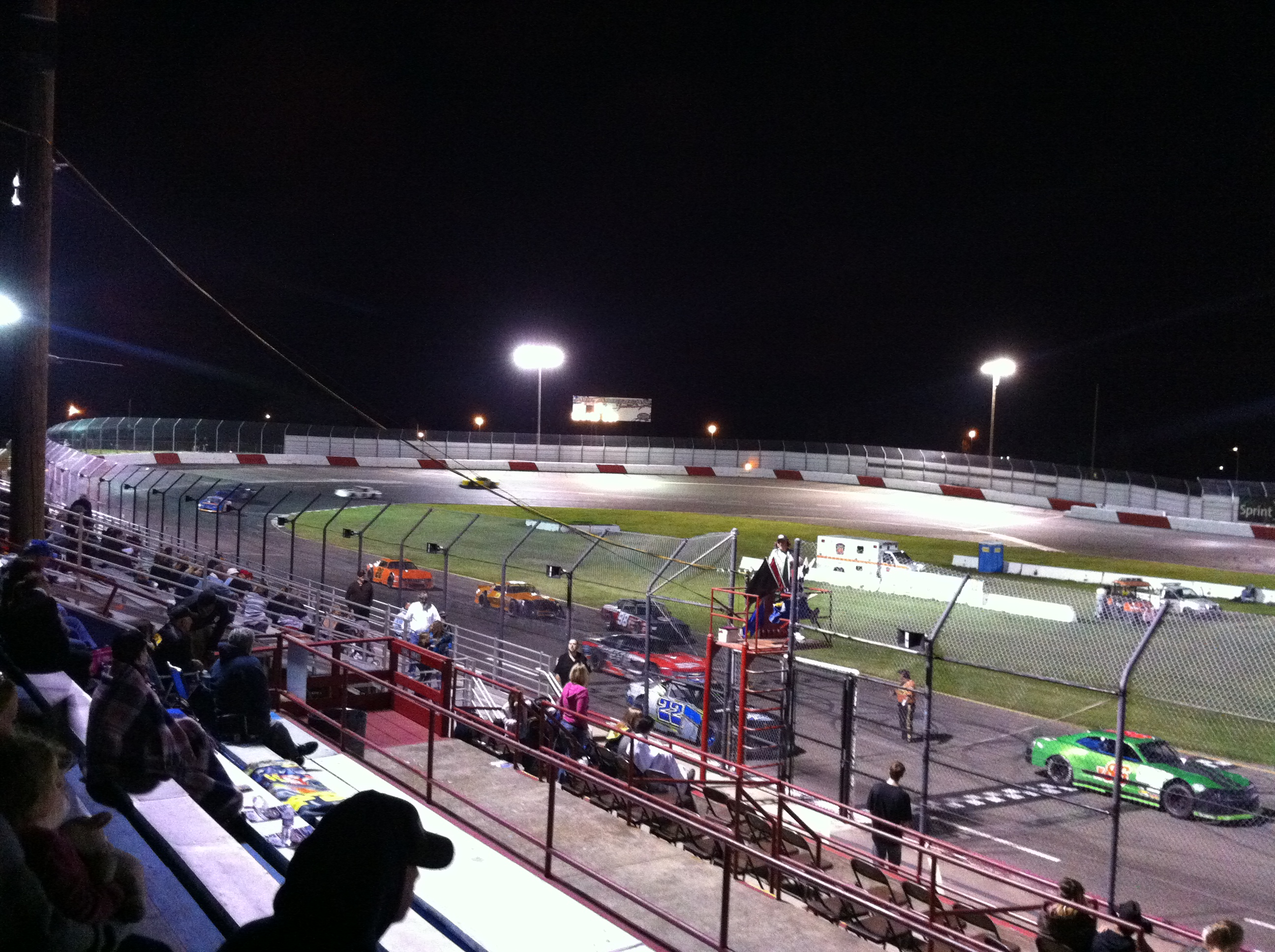
A 2014 photo of All American Speedway's last two turns taken from the track's grandstands.

All American Speedway (AAS) is measured at 0.333 mi (0.536 km). The first two turns are paved at a consistent 8°, and the last two turns are paved with a progressive banking system of 10–14°.

=== Amenities ===
AAS is located in Roseville, California, and served by Interstate 80 and California State Route 65. AAS is part of @the Grounds, which serves as Placer County's fairground area. According to the Placer County Fairgrounds, the track has a capacity of 4,000 bleacher seats.

== Track history ==
=== Planning and construction, first motorsports events ===
On February 22, 1955, The Roseville Press Tribune reported that the Placer County Fair board heard a request from the Roseville Firemen's Association, represented by Bruno Romani and Pete Radovinac, to build a racetrack at the Placer County Fairgrounds, the site of the Placer County Fair. The following month, the Placer County Fair Board approved the usage of the fair's existing grandstand for the races, with Romani estimating a cost of approximately $3,000 (adjusted for inflation$, 36,056) to build the track that was covered by local businessmen. Final approval to build the track from the Placer County Fair Board on the association's racing plan was given in April. The track, named the "Roseville Speedway" in local newspaper advertisements, was completed in time for the track's first scheduled event, with a test session being held on May 25. Roseville Speedway's first event was held on May 29, 1955, with Dick Queen winning the first feature event at the facility. After the first race, renovations were made on the track's banking and public address system. In 1964, renovations were made to the track's lighting system alongside the removal of poles in the track's infield for better sight lines. Five years later, new safety barriers and further renovations to the lighting were made alongside the widening of the backstretch.

=== Renaming and paving ===
In early April 1970, The Sacramento Bee reported that the Central State Racing Association, which sanctioned races at Roseville Speedway at the time, backed the proposal of paving the track. On the 26th, Romani and alongside fellow racing promoter Larry Burton, forming All American Sports Promotions, announced the paving of Roseville Speedway pending approval of the Placer County Fair Board and county supervisors. The group also announced the renaming of the track to "All American Speedway" in celebration of the city of Roseville being awarded the title of an All-America City. In a 1982 Sacramento Bee interview, Burton stated that he felt "a need for a paved track" in the Roseville area, becoming the main financier for the paving project. The final event on the original dirt oval was held on May 9, with Mike Wasina winning the final main event on the original dirt surface.

The $28,000 (adjusted for inflation$, 232,134) paving project was approved by county supervisors on May 12, with a reopening date set for the 22nd. However, the project's completion was delayed until early June, with an open house event open to the general public occurring on June 6. All American Speedway's reopening was subsequently delayed until June 12, with Rick Henderson winning the first main feature event at the newly paved track. In 1971, a lawsuit was filed by the city of Roseville against AAS for violating its city ordinances regarding noise despite the track being owned by the county instead of the city, calling the track a "public nuisance". In April 1972, while facing a temporary closure due to the lawsuit, Nevada County Superior Court judge Harold F. Wolters declared that the track was not a public nuisance. However, after further review, Wolters reversed his decision in December, barring Burton and Romani to hold races until noise restrictions mandated by the court order were met. After trying various other methods that led to decreased attendance, in 1973, mufflers were mandated despite initial hesitance from Burton.

Also in 1973, Romani left the partnership to recover from a heart attack, leaving Burton as the sole promoter of AAS. At the beginning of the 1977 season, the motorsports sanctioning body of NASCAR began to sanction races at AAS, obtaining sponsorship from Winston, a subsidiary of the R. J. Reynolds Tobacco Company. On July 26, 1977, AAS oversaw its first fatality when crew member Ivy Steenburgen was killed by a flying tire that came off a competitor's car during an accident, with the tire going into the track's pit area and hitting Steenburgen in the head. The following year, the track's second fatality occurred after racing driver Joe McKenzie died during a bomber race, suffering a heart attack mid-race.

=== Burton departure, subsequent failed Burton-led replacement proposals ===
On November 18, 1982, Burton announced plans to move his operations at AAS to a proposed facility in the area of the Sunset Industrial District located between the cities of Roseville, Rocklin, and Lincoln, which had been approved for rezoning by the county. Before Burton's lease expired at the end of the year, by early December, 5 groups, including Burton, formally expressed interest at obtaining control of racing operations at AAS under some new restrictions that limited the hours of racing. Despite some public opposition and a formal petition began by Roseville resident Peter Gordon to completely stop racing at the track, the Placer County Fair board recommended on the 20th to accept an operating offer from Arnold Brink and Al Youngblood for three years. With the recommendation, the duo stated plans to make some repairs to AAS and to pave of a parking lot at the cost of $90,000. As part of Burton's departure, AAS lost hosting rights to a major late model event known as the Rose Classic.

At the end of their original three-year operating lease, Brink and Youngblood ceased promotional duties at AAS before the 1986 racing season, stating it was due to "extenuating circumstances". After the duo's departure, the Placer County Fair Board took over managerial and promotional operations of AAS. In March 1986, AAS was formally renamed by fair board manager Ruben Martinez to "Placer County Speedway". In the fair association's first year of managing AAS, the organization made some renovations, which included upgrades to the track's lighting system and the addition of a grass infield.

==== Failed Burton-led replacement proposals ====
After Burton's announcement on November 18, the proposal received heavy opposition from some tenants in the Sunset Industrial District, the most prominent coming from technology company and tenant Hewlett-Packard, publicly stating plans to appeal the rezoning approval. In early December, Burton announced plans to relocate AAS' replacement to a site near the West Placer Regional Landfill, located 3 mi (4.8 km) south of Lincoln, with NASCAR president Bill France Jr. stating support for the project and promising to sanction the track under NASCAR if built. The proposal also faced opposition, this time from local residents. By August 1983 and with no work completed on the project, Burton admitted that the environmental review for the proposal was ongoing. On February 9, 1984, the 5,000-seat track proposal was approved by the Placer County Planning Commission on 39 conditions. The commission also further recommended that the project be expanded to be situated on 160 acres (65 ha) of land, up from the initial size of 30 acres (12 ha). However, on March 13, the Placer County Board of Supervisors rejected the proposal on the basis of public opposition and environmental concerns. Despite the rejection, Burton stated that he had considered "a couple or three different locations" to build the track, including some outside of Placer County.

On March 29, 1984, Burton announced plans to move his proposed track to a 78-acre (32 ha) site north of the Lincoln Rodeo Grounds in the city of Lincoln, under the project name of "Lincoln International Speedway". However, after a month, Burton announced in The Roseville Press Tribune that he was "uncertain" about building the track due to public opposition and a dispute on whether or not the site location would be annexed into the city of Lincoln. In June, with no progress made, Burton stated that "lots of studies" were being conducted by the local government, stating that "this is the most time-consuming thing I've ever gotten into". Five months later, Burton announced the relocation of the proposal to a location on California State Route 65 and Sunset Boulevard. With the relocation, Burton's plans were enlarged to a $4,000,000 complex, with the proposal now including a 1/3 mi (0.54 km) paved oval, a 1/2 mi (0.80 km) clay dirt oval, a 1/2 mi (0.80 km) motocross course, a bicycle course, and an industrial park. Burton later announced a scheduled groundbreaking date of March or April 1985 if the environmental review was completed by January 1. Like his first proposal, the track received opposition from industrial space tenants and residents. In February 1985, the track was threatened by a proposal from Herman Miller Inc. to remove a proposed access road for the track, with the road bisecting a proposed industrial center that Herman Miller Inc. wanted to build.

In early March 1985, Burton announced another relocation to a plot of land 1/2 mi (0.80 km) north of their previous location due to the possibility of an intersection for State Route 65 being built at the previous location. Three months later, the project was approved by Caltrans, with stated plans to start construction of the facility in the spring of 1986. In the following months, the track received opposition from various industrial organizations and commissions, with the Placer County Business and Industrial Development Commission voting 9–1 on rejecting the track. On June 26, the track was rejected by the Placer County Board of Supervisors. However, after appealing to the board, the track was approved on a vote of 3–2 by the board of supervisors on July 28, with Burton obtaining a two-year use permit. However, by mid-March 1987, no work was completed due to a disagreement over the purchase price of the land, The Sacramento Bee stated that an "indefinite hold" was held on any further plans. Later in the month, after the land was given back to its original owner via an arbitrator's decision, Burton's financial partner, John Attebury, pulled support from the project. Three months later, the project was declared dead by Burton after the purchase agreement for the land was cancelled by the Placer County Superior Court.

=== Renovations and track reconfiguration ===
Before the 1988 season, AAS regained sanctioning from NASCAR for its races. In preparation for hosting NASCAR-sanctioned races, AAS underwent several renovations, including a full repave of the track, the construction of billboards and an electronic scoreboard, and the repainting of the walls to red and white to match the colors of then-title sponsor Winston. In early 1990, the track's name was reverted to All American Speedway. In 2006, with the closure of the nearby Stockton 99 Speedway, AAS obtained the NASCAR Weekly Series (now known as the NASCAR Local Racing Series) races from Stockton 99 Speedway. To prepare for the events, AAS underwent a $1.2 million renovation project, which included the construction of an enlarged pit area located at the track's backstretch, new lighting, new safety barriers, and new catchfencing. The track was also reconfigured, with each straightaway being extended approximately 90 ft (27 m) to the north. In addition, the backstretch was widened by 32 ft (9.8 m) and the frontstretch widened by 12 ft (3.7 m). Renovations started during Thanksgiving weekend of 2006 and were completed by April 2007. With the track reconfiguration, it was remeasured to a 1/3 mi (0.54 km).

Four years after the renovations, numerous complaints from residents about noise levels were made public, with a Placer County grand jury report released in February 2011 stating that no proper environmental studies had been completed before the extension of the track. Another Placer County grand jury report was released in March 2012, which claimed that the Placer County government was negligent in overseeing contracts which led to the extension of the track, which the report claimed was "unauthorized". The report further recommended that the Placer County Board of Supervisors seek an alternative nonprofit corporation or group to operate both the fairgrounds and AAS. On July 14, 2012, AAS oversaw its third fatality after racing driver and musician Ron Pestana died in a spectator race, suffering a heart attack during the race and subsequently crashing into a tire barrier at the track's pit area entry lane.

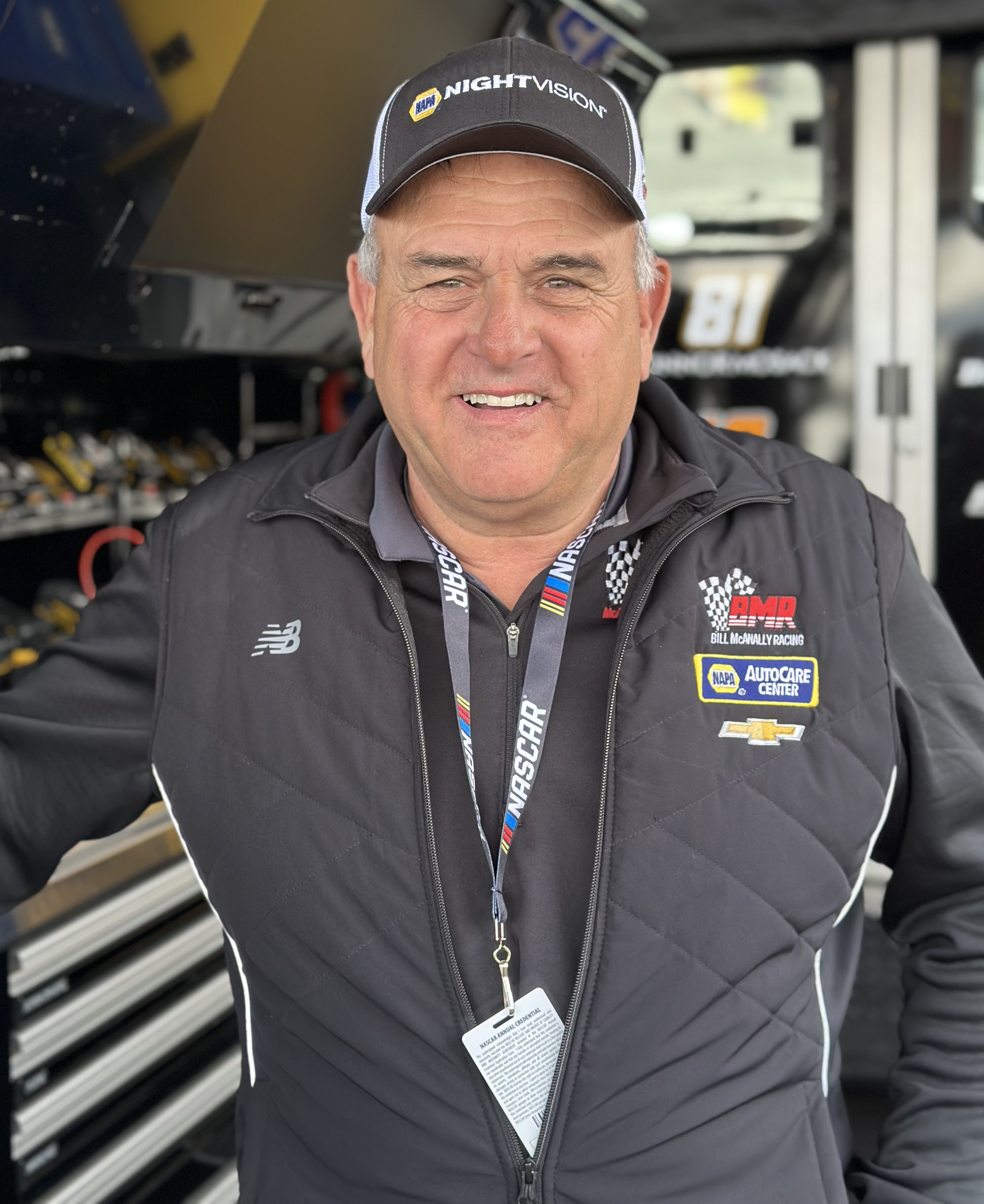
From 2018 until 2023, NASCAR team owner Bill McAnally (pictured in 2025) was the promoter of All American Speedway. He previously raced and staged some events at the track prior to his tenure as its promoter.

In 2017, operating control of the Placer County Fairgrounds was taken over by Placer Valley Tourism, the tourism agency of Placer County. As part of the takeover, Placer Valley Tourism collaborated with the Placer County government to invest millions of dollars into the renovation of the Placer County Fairgrounds. As part of the renovations, AAS signed a long-term contract with NASCAR team owner, former NASCAR driver, and Roseville native Bill McAnally to promote the track under his racing promotion company, Bill McAnally Racing Promotions. McAnally previously hosted and promoted events at the facility since 2008. In January 2024, track operator of Kevin Harvick's Kern Raceway and racing promoter Tim Huddleston replaced McAnally as promoter of AAS, with Huddleston and Bill McAnally Racing Promotions entering a partnership to stage races at the facility.

== Events and uses ==
=== Auto racing events ===
AAS hosts various NASCAR-sanctioned races. The venue is the host of an annual ARCA Menards West Series event, which it has annually hosted since 2008. AAS also hosts multiple NASCAR Local Racing Series and INEX divisions, including limited late models, modified, street stock, mini stock, and Legends car divisions as of 2026. Previously, AAS also held the NASCAR Southwest Series from 1986 until 1990. AAS has also hosted various other series, including the CARS Tour West and the SRL Southwest Tour.

=== Other events ===
- On July 20, 1984, AAS hosted a rock concert headlined by Berlin. The concert was described by Sacramento Union writer Steve Martarano as a "depressing setting", heavily criticizing the track and calling AAS "pitiful".
