= Elk Grove Citizen =

Weekly newspaper published in Elk Grove, California

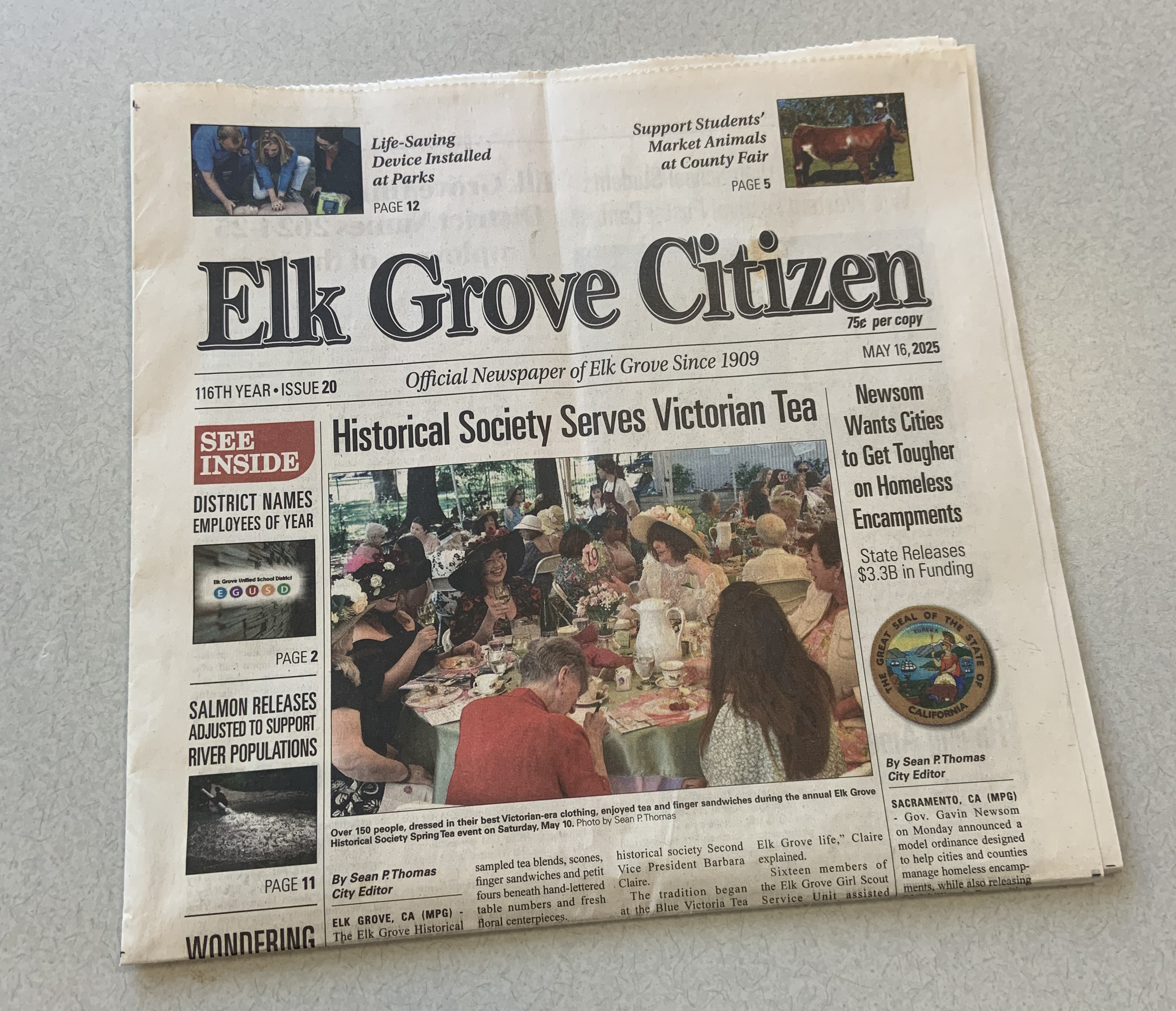
- An edition of the Elk Grove Citizen published on May 16, 2025.
- Type: Weekly newspaper
- Owner(s): Messenger Publishing Group
- Founder(s): Harry W. Preston
- Publisher: Paul V. Scholl
- Editor: Sean P. Thomas
- Founded: 1909
- Language: English
- Headquarters: 217 4th St, Galt, CA 95632
- Sister newspapers: The Galt Herald
- OCLC number: 36535816
- Website: egcitizen.com

The Elk Grove Citizen is a weekly newspaper published in Elk Grove, California.

== History ==
The newspaper was first published by Harry W. Preston on Feb. 21, 1909. A few months later Preston was charged with assaulting a Chico woman. He fled and was later arrested. Preston plead guilty and was sentenced to 160 days in jail.

In 1912, A. P. Bettersworth purchased the paper, and sold it in 1915 to William C. Brill. He then owned and operated the paper for 37 years until selling it in 1953 to Henry R. Tweith, who published The Galt Herald. In 1959, Tweith sold both papers to Roy Herburger. He operated the paper until he retired in 1999. The business was handed over to his son David Herburger.

In 2004, the Elk Grove Unified School District named a newly constructed elementary school after Roy Herburger in his honor. He died in 2018 at age 87.

In 2021, Herburger Publications, Inc. sold its papers to Citizen managing editor Bonnie Rodriguez and her company Valley Oak Press. She sold the paper about two years later to Paul V. Scholl, owner of Messenger Publishing Group based in Carmichael.
