= Lincoln News Messenger =

Weekly newspaper published in Lincoln, California

- Type: Weekly newspaper
- Owner: Alta Newspaper Group
- Founder: V.W. Beecroft
- Publisher: John Love
- Editor: Bill Poindexter
- Founded: 1890 (as the Lincoln Report)
- Language: English
- City: Lincoln, California
- Website: lincolnnewsmessenger.com

The Lincoln News Messenger is a weekly newspaper published in Lincoln, California.

== History ==
In June 1890, Mrs. V.W. Beecroft founded the Lincoln Report. A year later it was bought by Frank L. Sanders, A.B. Berry and W.D. Ingram. Sanders was made editor and the name was then changed to the Placer News Messenger, but would later be renamed again to the Lincoln News Messenger. In 1894, H.W. Bassac bought the paper. By 1899, John A. Williams was the proprietor and editor.

Sanders required the News Messenger some time around 1905. He published it until his death in December 1924. Earnest D. Fred then bought the paper in January 1925. A few months later Fred sold the paper again to C.E. Finney and William Butler, who was employed at the paper for the past eight years. Finney became the business manager and Butler became the editor. After Butler died, his estate and Finney sold the News Messenger to R.E. Blankenburg and Milton P. Kjer, who owned The Roseville Press Tribune, and Eldridge F. Trott, of Williams, Arizona.

Trott operated the paper for two decades. In 1969, husband-and-wife Ben D. and Carmela Martin of Penryn bought the paper from Trott. Mr. Martin was the general manager of the California Publishers Association and Mrs. Martin was women's editor of The Sacramento Bee for eight years. She was also the executive editor of The Roseville Press Tribune, which the Martins co-owned. In 1975, the Martins purchased The Loomis News.

In 1980, El Dorado Newspapers, a subsidiary of McClatchy, bought the News Messenger from the Martins, who continued to operate their Loomis paper. The company sold the paper in 1994 to Brehm Communications Inc. In December 2022, the News Messenger was one of six newspapers published by Gold Country Media, a subsidiary of Brehm, sold to Gold Mountain Media, a subsidiary of Alta Newspaper Group.
