= Antioch Daily Ledger =

Former daily newspaper in Antioch, California

- Type: Daily newspaper
- Owner: Contra Costa Newspapers (Knight Ridder)
- Founded: March 26, 1870; 156 years ago as Antioch Ledger; April 5, 1937; 89 years ago as Antioch Daily Ledger; August 7, 1994; 31 years ago as Ledger Dispatch; October 24, 2005; 20 years ago as East County Times
- Ceased publication: April 2, 1937; 89 years ago as Antioch Ledger; August 7, 1994; 31 years ago as Antioch Daily Ledger; October 21, 2005; 20 years ago as Ledger Dispatch
- Language: English
- Headquarters: 1700 Cavallo Road, Antioch, California, U.S. (formerly)
- Website: www.eastbaytimes.com/location/antioch/

The Antioch Daily Ledger was a weekly newspaper based in Antioch, California, United States. Founded in 1870 as the Antioch Ledger, the Daily Ledger was Contra Costa County's largest newspaper until it was replaced by the Contra Costa Times. It was also Antioch's largest newspaper. The daily newspaper is published three days a week (Wednesday, Thursday, and Friday) as weekly community supplements of the Contra Costa Times.

== History ==
On March 26, 1870, Messrs. J.E.W. Townsend & White published the first edition of the Antioch Ledger. At some point Mr. White was replaced by Mr. Abbott. In 1871, Townsend retired and sold his interest to Eugene I. Fuller, who in 1872 was bought out by H.A. Weaver.

The paper was acquired by Charles F. Montgomery, formerly of the Tehama Tocsin in Red Bluff, in 1884, Professor W.B. Johnson in 1886, Mrs. L.M. Willis in 1887, Mr. Gill in 1889, Montgomery again in 1890, Clarence G. McDaniel in 1905, Albert W. Flaherty in 1921, Walter B. Stafford and William G. Baily in 1935.

On April 5, 1937, the newspaper expanded into a daily called the Antioch Daily Ledger. In 1941, Flaherty reacquired the paper from Stafford and Baily, who had purchased the Yreka Journal. In 1958, Dean Lesher, owner of the Madera News Tribune, Merced Sun-Star, and Contra Costa Times, acquired the Daily Ledger from Flaherty.

In 1979, Lesher acquired the neighboring Pittsburg Post-Dispatch. The Daily Ledger merged with the Pittsburg Post-Dispatch to become the Daily Ledger Post Dispatch on October 1, 1990, and was renamed again to the Ledger Dispatch on August 8, 1994. The Pittsburg Post-Dispatch was founded in 1930 with the merger of the Post and Dispatch newspapers. On August 29, 1995, two years after Lesher's death, Margaret Lesher sold the privately-held company to the Knight Ridder newspaper chain for $360 million, including the Ledger Dispatch. On July 11, 2001, the Ledger Dispatch was converted from five days a week to three days a week.

On October 21, 2005, the Ledger Dispatch published its last edition. The newspaper became East County Times on October 24, 2005. Between October 2017 and April 2018, the newspaper's former office was demolished.
