= Galt, California =

City in California, United States

- City
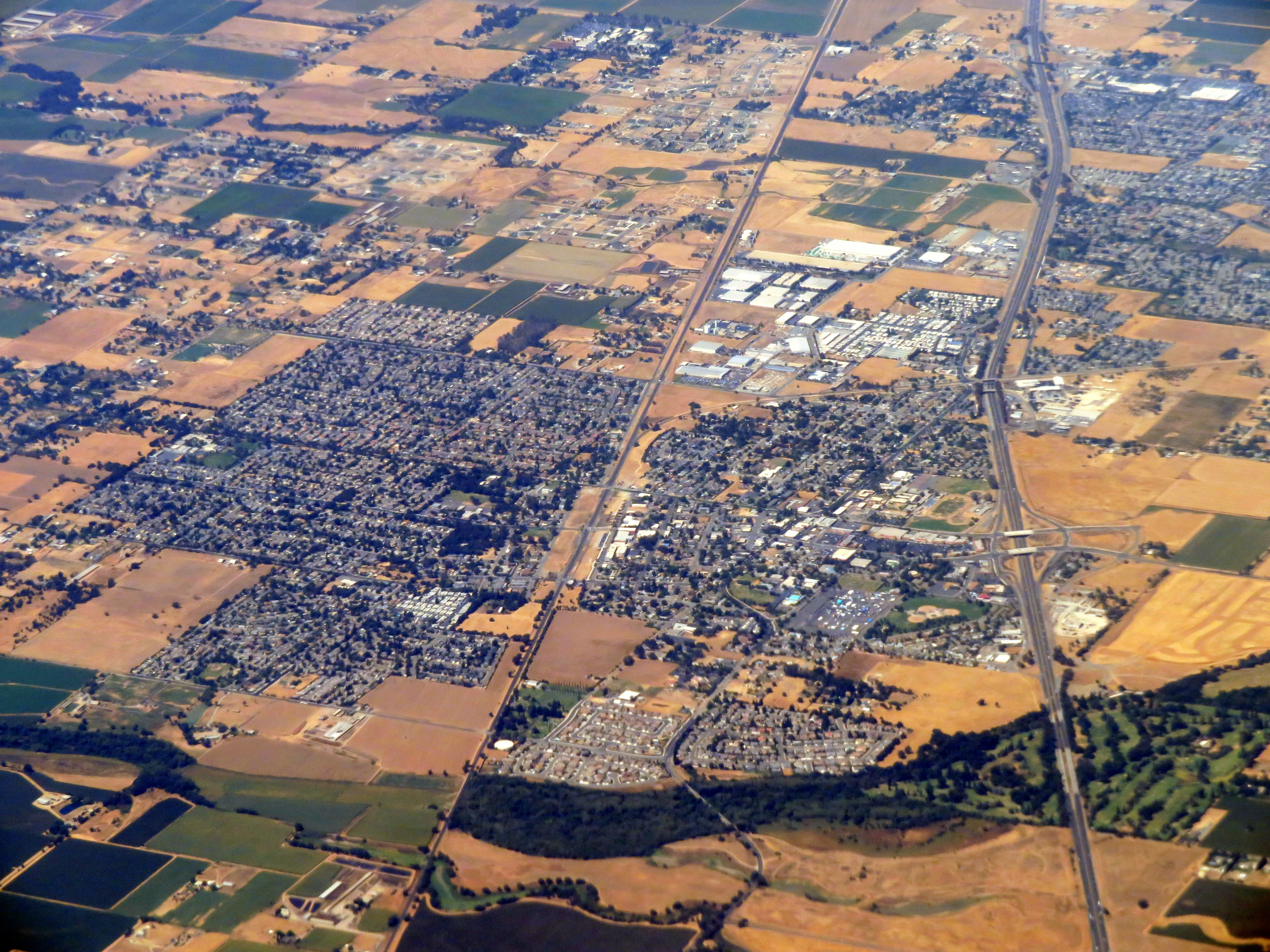
- Aerial view of Galt
- Interactive map of Galt, California
- Location in the contiguous United States
- Coordinates: 38°15′39″N 121°18′11″W
- Country: United States
- State: California
- County: Sacramento
- Incorporated: August 16, 1946

Government
  - Mayor: Shawn Farmer
  - Vice Mayor: Paul Sandhu
  - Chief of Police: Brian Kalinowski
  - City Treasurer: Shaun L. Farrell
  - Fire Chief (Cosumnes CSD): Felipe Rodriguez

Area
  - Total: 7.16 sq mi (18.54 km^{2})
  - Land: 7.15 sq mi (18.51 km^{2})
  - Water: 0.012 sq mi (0.03 km^{2}) 0.19%
- Elevation: 52 ft (16 m)

Population (2020)
  - Total: 25,383
  - Estimate (2025): 26,964
  - Density: 3,552/sq mi (1,371.5/km^{2})
- Time zone: UTC-8 (PST)
  - Summer (DST): UTC-7 (PDT)
- ZIP code: 95632
- Area code: 209
- FIPS code: 06-28112
- GNIS feature ID: 0277522
- Website: www.cityofgalt.org

Galt is a city in Sacramento County, California, United States. It is part of the Sacramento metropolitan area. The population was 25,383 at the 2020 census, up from 23,647 at the 2010 census.

== History ==
Galt was founded in 1869 by the Central Pacific Railroad as part of the first transcontinental railroad. The town is named after Galt, Ontario, the hometown of local rancher John McFarland.

== Geography ==
According to the United States Census Bureau, the city has a total area of 7.2 square miles (19 km^{2}), of which 99.81% is land and 0.19% is water.

The city is bordered entirely by unincorporated areas of both Sacramento and San Joaquin Counties.

=== Climate ===
According to the Köppen Climate Classification system, Galt has a warm-summer Mediterranean climate, abbreviated "Csa" on climate maps.

== Demographics ==
Historical population
Census	Pop.	Note	%±
1950	1,333		—
1960	1,868		40.1%
1970	3,200		71.3%
1980	5,514		72.3%
1990	8,889		61.2%
2000	19,472		119.1%
2010	23,647		21.4%
2020	25,383		7.3%
2025 (est.)	26,964	▲	6.2%
U.S. Decennial Census

=== 2020 census ===
As of the 2020 census, Galt had a population of 25,383. The population density was 3,552.1 inhabitants per square mile (1,371.5/km^{2}). The median age was 36.4 years. The age distribution was 25.9% under the age of 18, 9.3% aged 18 to 24, 25.8% aged 25 to 44, 25.0% aged 45 to 64, and 14.0% who were 65 years of age or older. For every 100 females, there were 95.2 males, and for every 100 females age 18 and over there were 92.7 males age 18 and over.

99.2% of residents lived in urban areas, while 0.8% lived in rural areas. The census reported that 99.4% of the population lived in households, 0.2% lived in non-institutionalized group quarters, and 0.4% were institutionalized.

There were 8,131 households in Galt, of which 41.7% had children under the age of 18 living in them. Of all households, 58.7% were married-couple households, 6.3% were cohabiting couple households, 12.6% were households with a male householder and no spouse or partner present, and 22.4% were households with a female householder and no spouse or partner present. About 16.2% of all households were made up of individuals and 8.8% had someone living alone who was 65 years of age or older. The average household size was 3.1. There were 6,424 families (79.0% of all households).

There were 8,304 housing units at an average density of 1,162.0 units per square mile (448.7 units/km^{2}). Of these, 8,131 (97.9%) were occupied; 74.3% were owner-occupied, and 25.7% were occupied by renters. The homeowner vacancy rate was 1.0%, the rental vacancy rate was 2.0%, and 2.1% of housing units were vacant.

Racial composition as of the 2020 census
Race	Number	Percent
White	12,871	50.7%
Black or African American	494	1.9%
American Indian and Alaska Native	439	1.7%
Asian	1,042	4.1%
Native Hawaiian and Other Pacific Islander	94	0.4%
Some other race	5,781	22.8%
Two or more races	4,662	18.4%
Hispanic or Latino (of any race)	11,588	45.7%

=== 2023 ACS estimates ===
In 2023, the US Census Bureau estimated that 19.7% of the population were foreign-born. Of all people aged 5 or older, 63.0% spoke only English at home, 31.6% spoke Spanish, 2.6% spoke other Indo-European languages, 2.7% spoke Asian or Pacific Islander languages, and 0.1% spoke other languages. Of those aged 25 or older, 84.0% were high school graduates and 21.1% had a bachelor's degree.

The median household income was $86,327, and the per capita income was $36,124. About 4.4% of families and 7.3% of the population were below the poverty line.

=== 2010 census ===
At the 2010 census Galt had a population of 23,647. The population density was 3,977.8 inhabitants per square mile (1,535.8/km^{2}). The racial makeup of Galt was 15,639 (66.1%) White, 430 (1.8%) African American, 361 (1.5%) Native American, 815 (3.4%) Asian, 108 (0.5%) Pacific Islander, 4,834 (20.4%) from other races, and 1,460 (6.2%) from two or more races. Hispanic or Latino of any race were 10,113 persons (42.8%).

The census reported that 23,498 people (99.4% of the population) lived in households, 32 (0.1%) lived in non-institutionalized group quarters, and 117 (0.5%) were institutionalized.

There were 7,262 households, 3,516 (48.4%) had children under the age of 18 living in them, 4,431 (61.0%) were opposite-sex married couples living together, 895 (12.3%) had a female householder with no husband present, 465 (6.4%) had a male householder with no wife present. There were 431 (5.9%) unmarried opposite-sex partnerships, and 32 (0.4%) same-sex married couples or partnerships. 1,171 households (16.1%) were one person and 547 (7.5%) had someone living alone who was 65 or older. The average household size was 3.24. There were 5,791 families (79.7% of households); the average family size was 3.62.

The age distribution was 7,347 people (31.1%) under the age of 18, 2,262 people (9.6%) aged 18 to 24, 6,344 people (26.8%) aged 25 to 44, 5,414 people (22.9%) aged 45 to 64, and 2,280 people (9.6%) who were 65 or older. The median age was 32.4 years. For every 100 females, there were 97.4 males. For every 100 females age 18 and over, there were 94.3 males.

There were 7,678 housing units at an average density of 1,291.6 per square mile, of the occupied units 5,344 (73.6%) were owner-occupied and 1,918 (26.4%) were rented. The homeowner vacancy rate was 2.3%; the rental vacancy rate was 5.2%. 17,034 people (72.0% of the population) lived in owner-occupied housing units and 6,464 people (27.3%) lived in rental housing units.

== Arts and culture ==
Civic groups and clubs include:

- Galt Area Historical Society.
- Performing Animal Welfare Society (PAWS), a refuge for retired, abandoned or abused performing animals and exotic animals.
- Galt Lions Club.

The city hosts an annual winter bird festival, in conjunction with the Cosumnes River Preserve.

Brewster House is listed on the National Register of Historic Places.

The California Department of Corrections "Boot Camp" School is located in Galt.

== Government ==
Galt operates under an elected council form of government. The Mayor of Galt is peer elected by the entire City Council. Currently, the council members (with end of term in parentheses) are: Mayor Shawn Farmer (2026), Vice Mayor Paul Sandhu (2026), Council Member Bonnie Rodriguez (2026), Council Member Tim Reed (2028) and Council Member Mathew Pratton (2028).

In the California State Legislature, Galt is in the 6th senatorial district, represented by Republican Roger Niello, and the 9th Assembly district, represented by Republican Heath Flora.

In the United States House of Representatives, Galt is in California's 7th congressional district, represented by Democrat Doris Matsui.

== Education ==
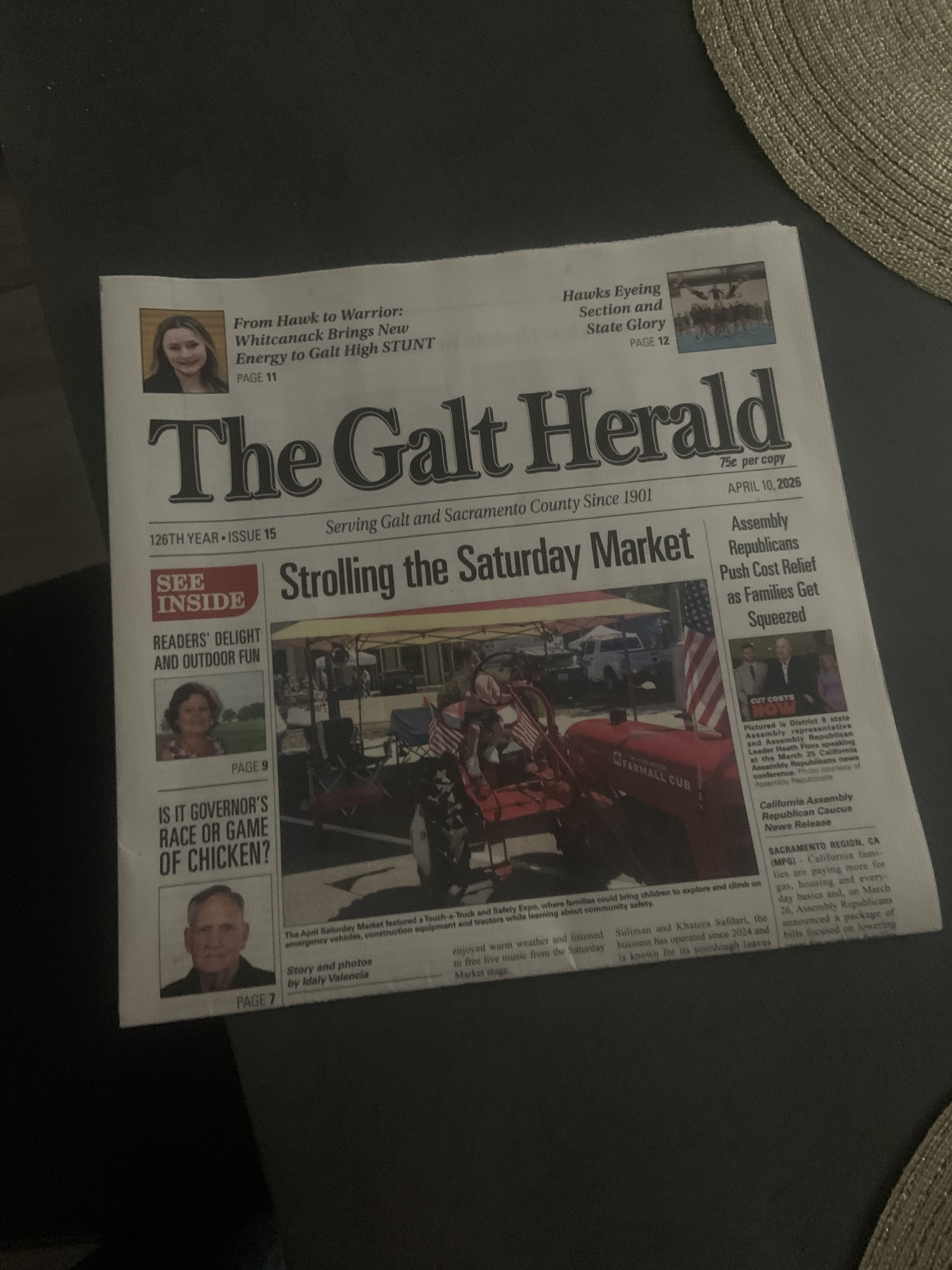
An edition of ''The Galt Herald'' published on Friday, April 10, 2026

Galt Joint Union Elementary School District operates the city's public elementary and intermediate schools, and Galt Joint Union High School District operates the city's public high schools.

== Media ==
Galt has had a weekly newspaper, The Galt Herald, since 1904.

== Infrastructure ==
The local fire department is owned and operated by the Cosumnes Community Services District.

== Notable people ==
- LeVar Burton, at the age of thirteen, entered St. Pius X seminary in Galt to become a priest.
- Ryan Mattheus, former pitcher for the Washington Nationals and Cincinnati Reds of Major League Baseball
- Zach Phillips, former MLB pitcher
- Stephanie Brown Trafton, gold medalist in the discus throw at the 2008 Summer Olympics
