= East Bay Times =

California newspaper

- Front page of the East Bay Times
- Type: Daily newspaper
- Format: Broadsheet
- Owner: Bay Area News Group (Digital First Media)
- Founder: George T. Crompton
- Publisher: Sharon Ryan
- Editor: Sarah Dussault
- Managing editor: Bryce Martin (content)
- Founded: 1911; 115 years ago (as the Contra Costa Courier)
- Headquarters: 2121 N. California Blvd, Suite 290, Walnut Creek, California 94596 U.S.
- Circulation: 55,787 Daily; 100,200 Sunday (as of 2022)
- ISSN: 2473-0351
- Website: eastbaytimes.com

The East Bay Times is a daily broadsheet newspaper based in Walnut Creek, California, United States, owned by the Bay Area News Group (BANG), a subsidiary of Media News Group, that serves Contra Costa and Alameda counties, in the East Bay region of the San Francisco Bay Area. It was founded as the Contra Costa Courier in 1911, and took its current name in 2016 when it was merged with other sister papers in the East Bay. Its oldest merged title is the Oakland Tribune founded in 1874.

== History ==
=== Origins ===
On June 1, 1911, George T. Crompton first published the weekly Contra Costa Courier in Walnut Creek, California. He was previously worked at another local paper called the Contra Costa Gazette. In January 1913, Crompton founded another paper called the Danville Journal.

Both papers financially struggled due to mismanagement. In November 1914, O.A. King acquired Crompton's papers. In 1915, G.B. Daniels, publisher of the Oakland Enquirer, became associated with the business. Later that year Col. W.L. White bought out King and Daniels. In May 1918, White merged the Courier and Journal to form the Walnut Creek Courier-Journal. A year later the paper moved into its own, larger building.

In 1922, James L. Acree and Dr. Harry T. Silver acquired the paper from White. A year later the firm dissolved and Silver took sole possession of the Courier-Journal. In 1938, Silver suffered a stroke, but soon recovered. However, he remained virtually retired and his wife Maude M. Silver served as publisher. In 1945, Silver died. Later that year his widow sold the paper to David D. Newsom.

=== Dean Lesher ===
In 1947, Dean Lesher, publisher of the Merced Sun-Star, purchased the Courier-Journal from Newsom. In 1951, Lesher purchased a larger space for the paper's printing plant. On February 4, 1952, Lesher renamed the Courier-Journal to the Contra Costa Times. He soon expanded the weekly paper from a 1,000-circulation Pennysaver into a major daily in the Bay Area. In 1958, he began printing the Times on green paper.

Lesher gradually converted his publications into "controlled circulation" papers, meaning free delivery to every household while asking readers to voluntarily buy subscriptions. In 1962, Lesher he converted the Times into a "controlled circulation" paper, the nation's first suburban daily to do so, and added a news wire service and a Sunday Supplement.

In 1968, a angry mob attacked the paper's office, causing $50,000 worth of damage. About 25 men destroyed printing equipment in response to Lesher allegedly sending employees to work at several Los Angeles papers on strike. In 1974, the paper ceased being print on green paper, but readers continued to call it the "Green Sheet."

Over the years Lesher acquired other Bay Area weeklies and converted them into zoned editions of the Times, such as the West County Times in Richmond, the Valley Times in Pleasanton, the San Ramon Valley Times in Danville, and the Daily Ledger Post Dispatch in Antioch. Lesher published the Times until his death on May 13, 1993.

=== Corporate ownership ===
On August 29, 1995, his Lesher's widow Margaret Ryan Lesher sold the privately held company to the Knight Ridder newspaper chain for $360 million. Knight Ridder was later purchased by the Sacramento-based McClatchy Company in June 2006 in a deal valued at $4.5 billion. The deal was contingent on McClatchy selling off 12 of the 32 newspapers it had just purchased, including the Contra Costa Times.

On April 26, 2006, it was announced that MediaNews Group, then headed by William Dean Singleton, would purchase four of the "orphan 12", including the Contra Costa Times and San Jose Mercury News, for $1 billion. Although that transaction was completed on August 2, 2006, a lawsuit claiming antitrust violations by MediaNews and the Hearst Corporation had also been filed in July 2006. The suit, which sought to undo the purchase of the four newspapers, was scheduled to go to trial on April 30, 2007. While extending until that date a preliminary injunction preventing collaboration of local distribution and national advertising sales by the two media conglomerates, U.S. District Judge Susan Illston on December 19, 2006, expressed doubt over the legality of the purchase. On April 25, 2007, days before the trial was scheduled to begin, the parties reached a settlement in which MediaNews Group preserved its acquisitions.

As part of a reorganization announced in 2011, the Contra Costa Times was slated to be merged with the East County Times, San Ramon Valley Times, Tri-Valley Herald and San Joaquin Herald. However, BANG announced on October 27, 2011, that it would retain the Contra Costa Times and East County Times mastheads and only combine the Tri-Valley Herald, San Joaquin Herald, and San Ramon Valley Times under a new Tri-Valley Times masthead, reducing the number of mastheads from five to three.

On April 5, 2016, the three remaining Times editions were merged along with the company's other newspaper in the East Bay, the Oakland Tribune, which it had owned since 1992. The combined paper was named the East Bay Times.

In 2017, the staff of the East Bay Times was awarded the Pulitzer Prize for Breaking News Reporting, for "relentless coverage of the Ghost Ship warehouse fire, which killed 36 people at a warehouse party, and for reporting after the tragedy that exposed the city's failure to take actions that might have prevented it".

== Community weeklies ==
The East Bay Times publishes the following community weeklies:

- Alameda Journal
- Berkeley Voice
- The Journal (El Cerrito)
- The Montclarion
- The Piedmonter
- Oakland Tribune
- Daily Review
- The Argus
- Concord Transcript
- Walnut Creek Journal
- East County News
