= Brewster House (Galt, California) =

Historic house in California, United States

- U.S. National Register of Historic Places
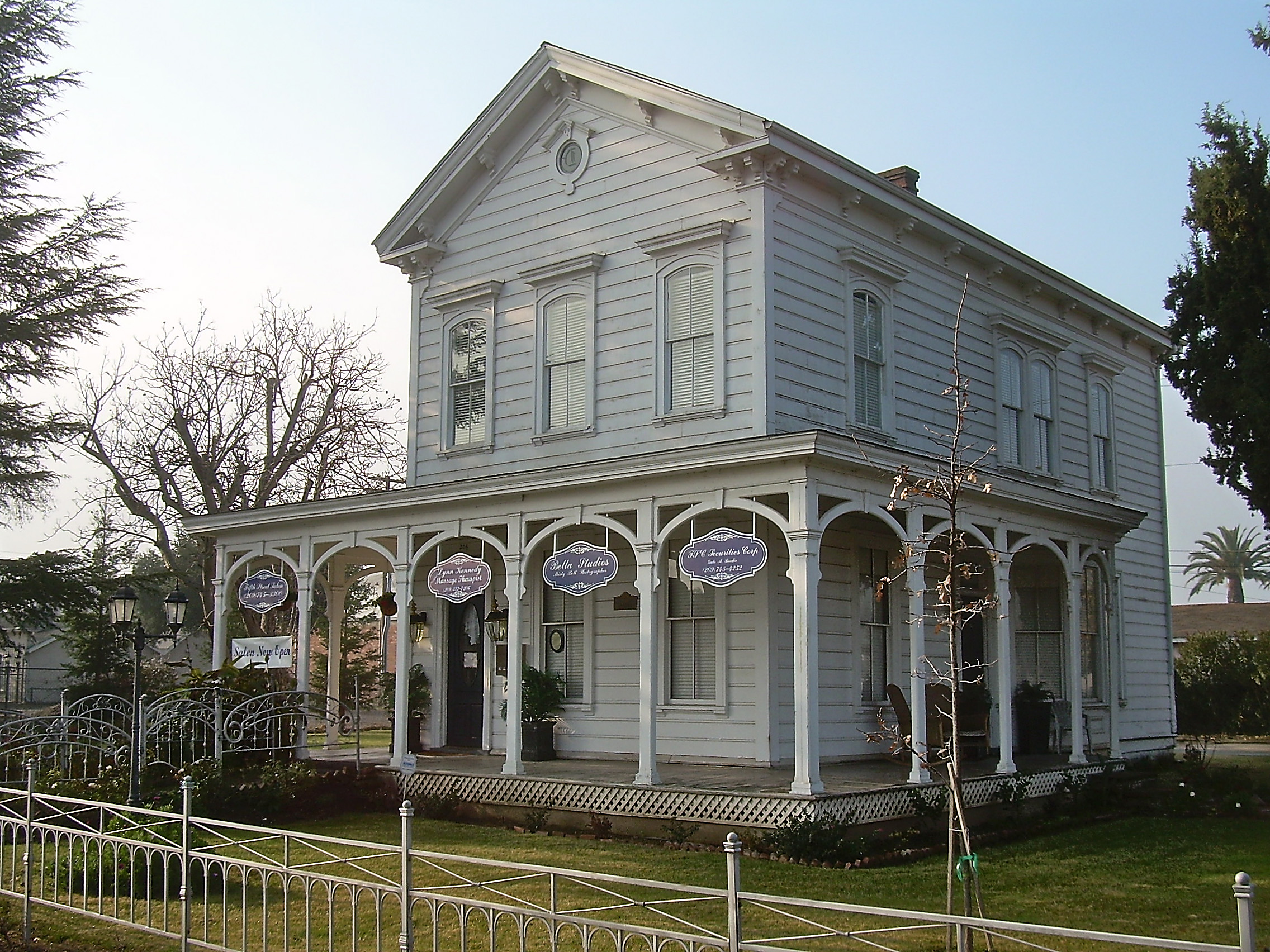

- Location within California Location within the United States
- Location: 206 5th St., Galt, California
- Coordinates: 38°15′12″N 121°18′14″W
- Area: less than one acre
- Built: 1869-70
- Built by: Sawyer Bros.
- Architectural style: Victorian Italianate
- NRHP reference No.: 78000740
- Added to NRHP: June 23, 1978

The Brewster House is in Galt, California. It is a wooden Victorian Italianate style house built in 1869–70. It was listed on the National Register of Historic Places in 1978.

It is a two-story wood-frame house. It has also been known as Cinquinis House.

== See also ==
- National Register of Historic Places listings in Sacramento County, California
- California Historical Landmarks in Sacramento County, California
