= Alameda Journal =

- Type: Weekly newspaper
- Format: Broadsheet
- Owner: Digital First Media
- Founder(s): John Crittenden; John McNulty
- Editor: Jon Kawamoto
- Founded: 1987
- Ceased publication: 2016
- Language: English
- Headquarters: 175 Lennon Ln Ste 100, Alameda, California, United States
- Circulation: 23,259
- OCLC number: 37711480
- Website: www.eastbaytimes.com/alameda

The Alameda Journal was weekly newspaper published in Alameda, California, from 1987 until 2016, when it was merged into the East Bay Times.

== History ==
In April 1987, publisher John Crittenden and general manager John McNulty published the first edition of the weekly Alameda Journal. In 1992, Hills Newspapers, Inc. acquired the paper. By then the Journal had expanded to a twice-weekly with a circulation of 30,000. Warren "Chip" Brown owned and operated the company.

In 1998, Hills Newspapers was acquired by Knight Ridder and the chain was merged into its subsidiary, Contra Costa Newspapers. In 2006, McClatchy agreed to purchase Knight Ridder, and this resulted in the Journal being sold to MediaNews Group.

In 2014, the Journal ceased free delivery of the paper, requiring those wishing for delivery to subscribe to the Oakland Tribune. In 2016, the Journal was consolidated into the East Bay Times.
