= Elk Grove, California =

City in California, United States

- City
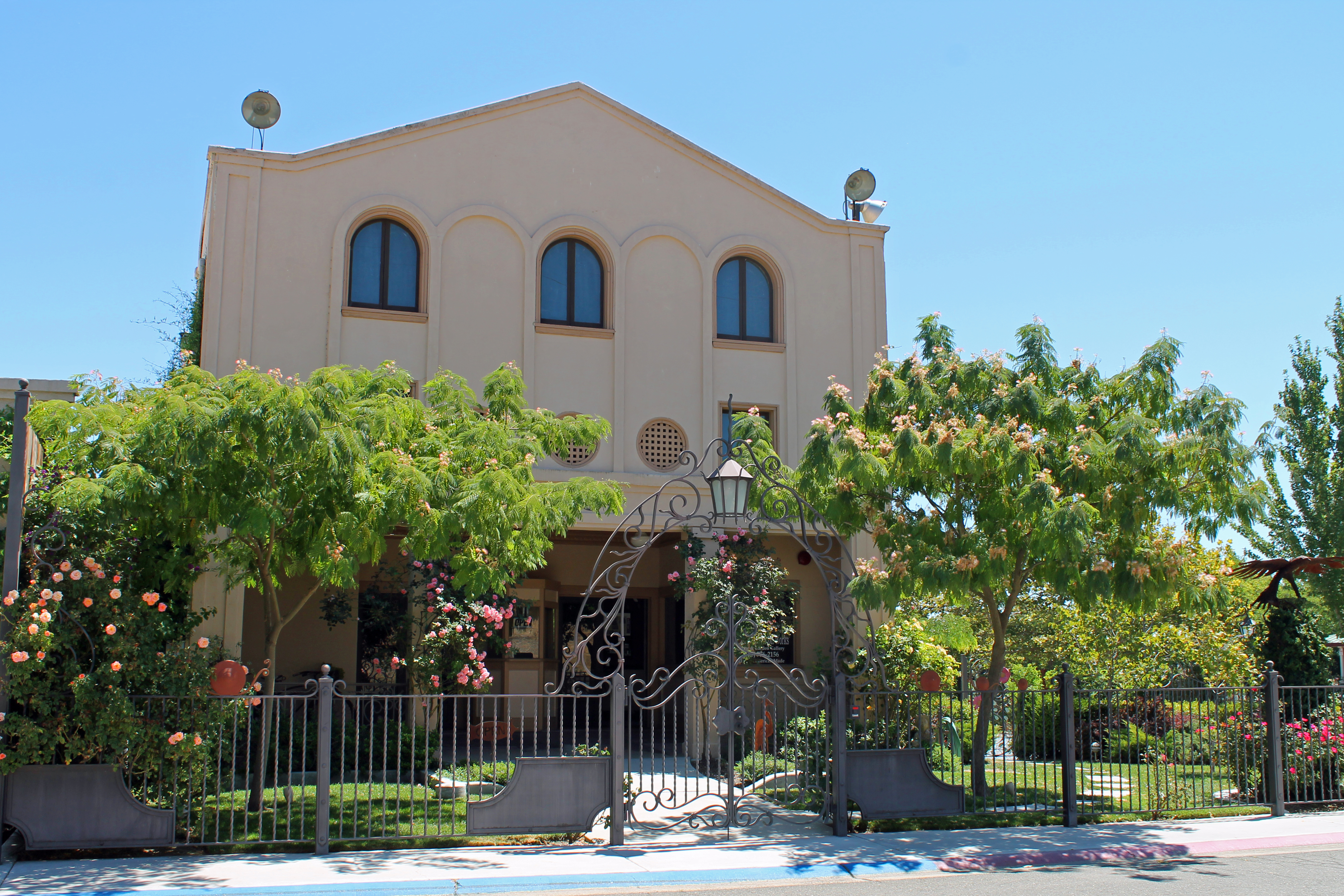
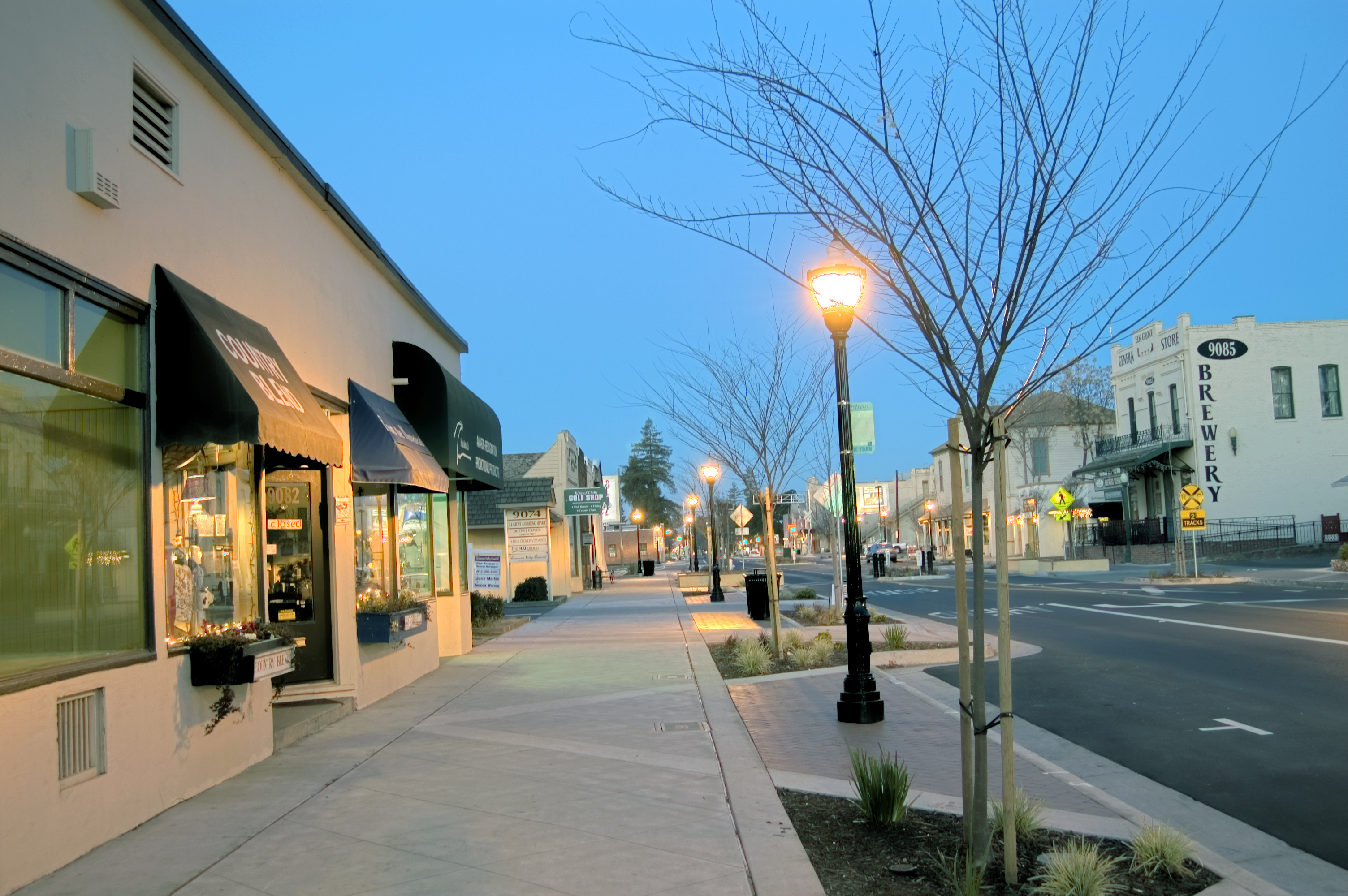
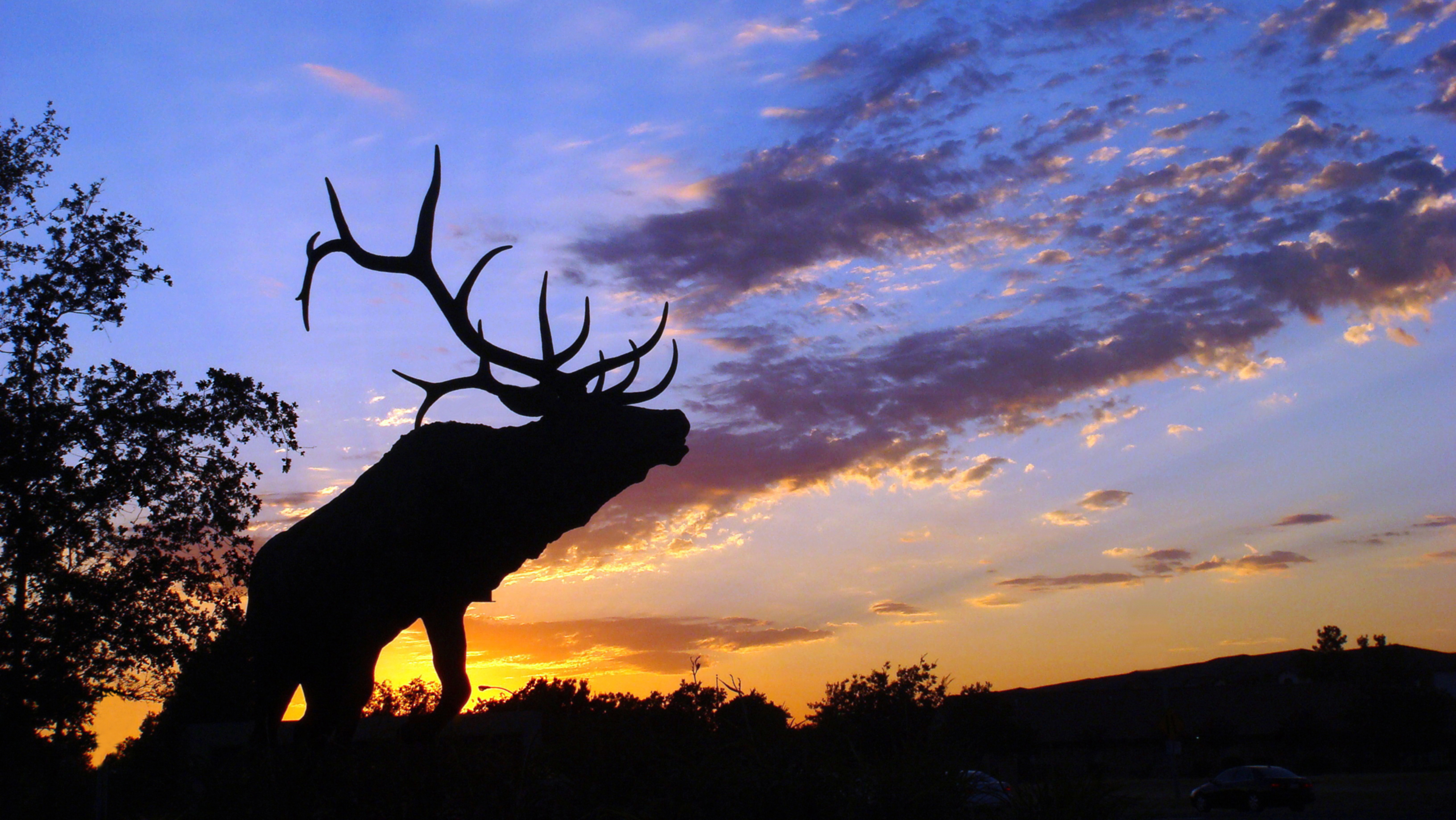
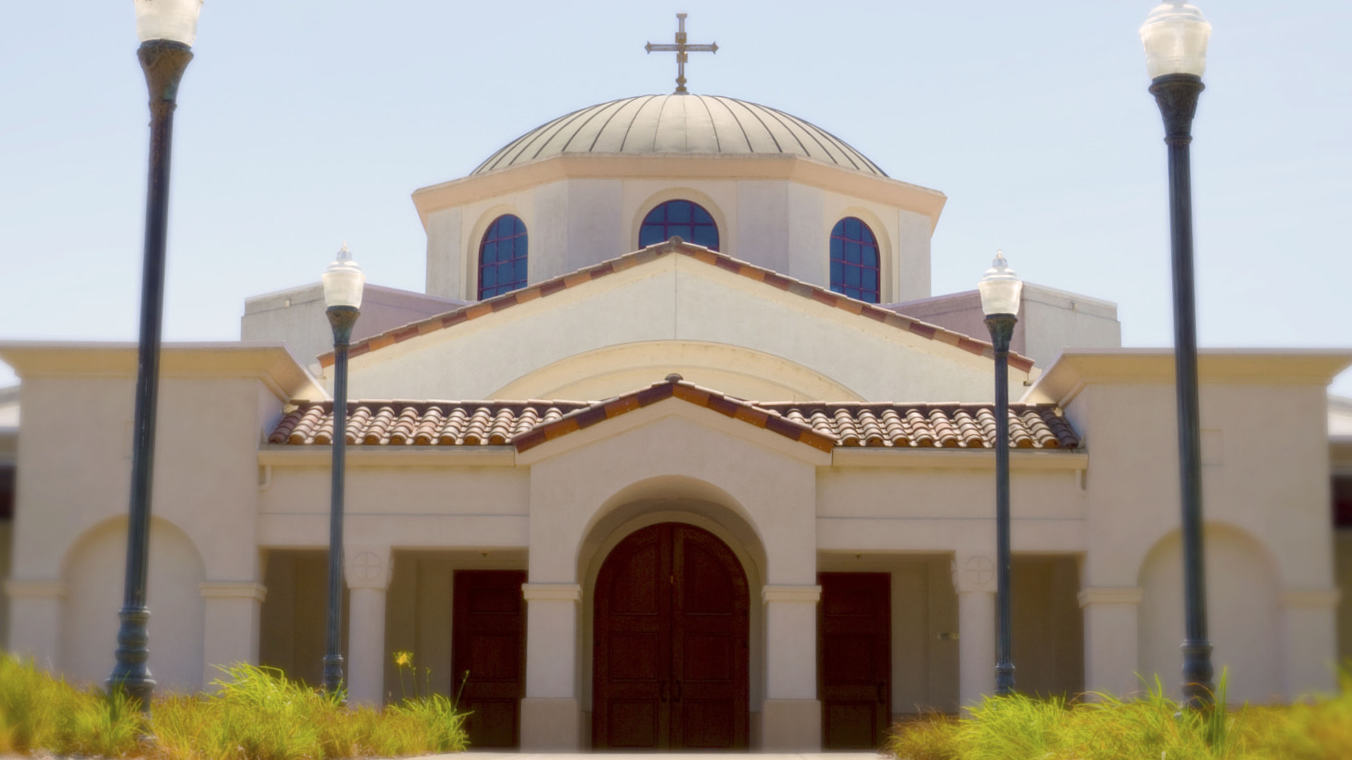

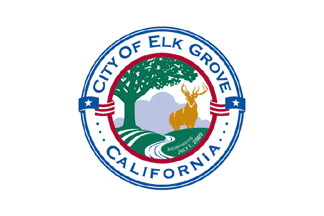
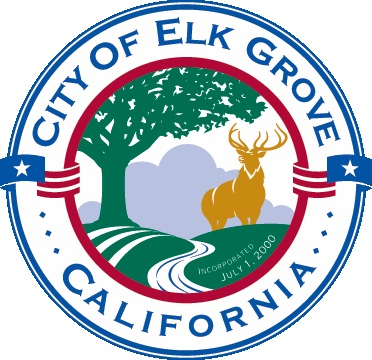
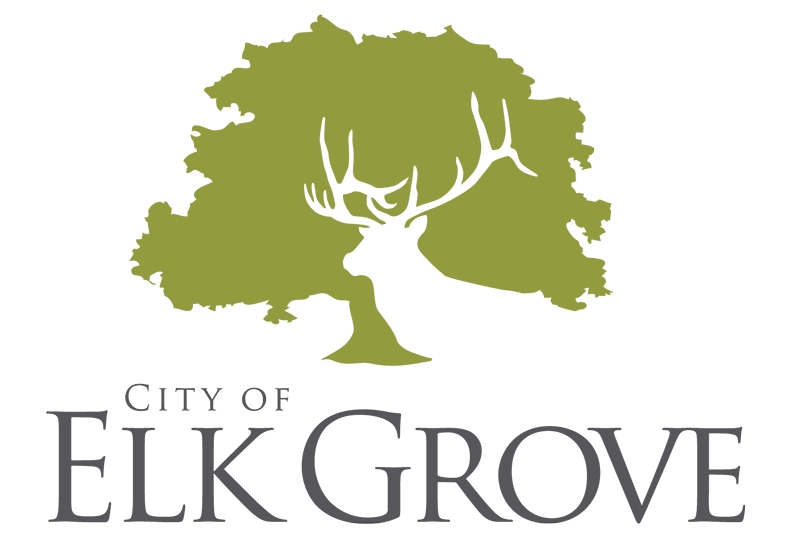
- Flag Seal Coat of arms Wordmark
- Interactive map of Elk Grove, California
- Location within California Location within the United States
- Coordinates: 38°26′18″N 121°22′55″W
- Country: United States
- State: California
- County: Sacramento
- District: Cosumnes CSD
- Incorporated: July 1, 2000

Government
  - Type: Council/Manager
  - Mayor: Bobbie Singh-Allen
  - Vice Mayor: Rod Brewer (appointed by city council and rotated annually)
  - Chief Of Police: Bobby Davis
  - Fire Chief (Cosumnes CSD): Felipe Rodriguez

Area
  - Total: 42.20 sq mi (109.29 km^{2})
  - Land: 41.99 sq mi (108.76 km^{2})
  - Water: 0.20 sq mi (0.53 km^{2}) 0.49%
- Elevation: 46 ft (14 m)

Population (2020)
  - Total: 176,124
  - Estimate (2025): 185,007
  - Rank: 2nd in Sacramento County; 26th in California; 145th in the United States
  - Density: 4,190.3/sq mi (1,617.89/km^{2})
- Time zone: UTC-08:00 (PST)
  - Summer (DST): UTC-07:00 (PDT)
- ZIP codes: 95624, 95757–95759
- Area code: 916, 279
- FIPS code: 06-22020
- GNIS feature IDs: 277506, 2410425
- Website: elkgrove.gov

Elk Grove is a city in Sacramento County, California, United States. Located just south of the state capital of Sacramento, it is part of the Sacramento metropolitan area. As of the 2020 Census, the population of the city was 176,124. A 2025 Census estimate puts the population of the city at 185,007. Elk Grove has many wineries, wine cellars, and vineyards. Elk Grove was the fastest-growing city in the U.S. between July 1, 2004, and July 1, 2005, and is also presently the second-largest city in Sacramento County by population.

It is a general law city with a council/manager form of government. One of Elk Grove's largest employers is the Elk Grove Unified School District, which is the city's second-largest employer.

== History ==
The Miwoks, a Native American tribe, once inhabited the area until the Westward Expansion of the United States, in which the Miwoks were relocated to reservations. In 1808, Spanish explorer Gabriel Moraga entered the region, naming the valley "Sacramento Valley" in honor of Sacramento, the "Holy Sacrament" in Spanish, giving the northerly city of Sacramento its name. A writer on Moraga's expedition wrote of the region:

Canopies of oaks and cottonwoods, many festooned with grapevines, overhung both sides of the blue current. Birds chattered in the trees and big fish darted through the pellucid depths. The air was like champagne, and (the Spaniards) drank deep of it, drank in the beauty around them.

Elk Grove was founded in 1850 as a stage stop for travelers coming from Sacramento and the San Francisco Bay Area, when the Elk Grove Hotel and Stage Stop was opened by James Hall, and the town was named after it. He named the area Elk Grove because he found elk antlers in nearby tree groves, and he lived in a town of the same name in the state of Missouri. In 1868, the Western Division of the Central Pacific Railroad came through about a mile east of Elk Grove. At this new location, another hotel was built to accommodate travelers and was named the Elk Grove Hotel.

In the following decades, Elk Grove remained a small farming community with little urban development. In the late 1980s, suburban development projects began to arise around the community, specifically in the north near Sacramento. These were meant to serve Sacramento's population, as well as San Francisco commuters seeking a commuting community relatively near the San Francisco Bay Area where they could reside. Such changes triggered a period of rapid growth. On July 1, 2000, Elk Grove incorporated as a city. The city's growth peaked in 2004 and 2005, when Elk Grove was declared the fastest growing city in the US.

Apple Inc. manufactured its iMac line in Elk Grove as late as 2002. After many of those tasks were offshored in 2004, the facility was converted into the modern Apple Elk Grove campus. In 2018, Apple invested $4.2 million into expanding the office space, expanding its already established AppleCare support presence in the region.

In 2008, Elk Grove suffered heavily from the subprime mortgage crisis due to its suburban nature.

In 2011, two Sikh American grandfathers were killed while out for a walk on Stockton Boulevard. This led to a national public outcry by the community, raising safety concerns for the city's 3,000 Sikh community members. The city completed the "Singh and Kaur Park" in 2021 to commemorate the lives of the slain men, and to raise awareness about the Sikh faith. In 2020, Elk Grove elected Bobbie Allen-Singh as its new mayor, making her the first Sikh woman to hold the position of mayor in an American city. She secured re-election for her second term in 2022 and for her third term in 2024, achieving victories in both elections by progressively larger margins.

== Geography ==
=== Climate ===
Elk Grove is 5–10 miles (8–16 km) south of the state capital in Sacramento and experiences a hot-summer Mediterranean climate (Köppen: Csa) with hot summers and cool winters. Summers are moderated by a cool Pacific Ocean breeze also known as the "delta breeze" which comes through the Sacramento–San Joaquin River Delta from the San Francisco Bay.

Climate data for Elk Grove, California
| Month | Jan | Feb | Mar | Apr | May | Jun | Jul | Aug | Sep | Oct | Nov | Dec | Year |
|---|---|---|---|---|---|---|---|---|---|---|---|---|---|
| Record high °F (°C) | 74 (23) | 79 (26) | 88 (31) | 95 (35) | 103 (39) | 112 (44) | 112 (44) | 113 (45) | 117 (47) | 101 (38) | 86 (30) | 73 (23) | 117 (47) |
| Mean daily maximum °F (°C) | 56 (13) | 61 (16) | 66 (19) | 72 (22) | 80 (27) | 88 (31) | 93 (34) | 92 (33) | 88 (31) | 78 (26) | 64 (18) | 56 (13) | 75 (24) |
| Mean daily minimum °F (°C) | 41 (5) | 42 (6) | 44 (7) | 47 (8) | 51 (11) | 56 (13) | 59 (15) | 59 (15) | 59 (15) | 53 (12) | 46 (8) | 40 (4) | 50 (10) |
| Record low °F (°C) | 21 (−6) | 23 (−5) | 25 (−4) | 34 (1) | 37 (3) | 41 (5) | 49 (9) | 50 (10) | 44 (7) | 31 (−1) | 24 (−4) | 15 (−9) | 15 (−9) |
| Average precipitation inches (mm) | 3.5 (89) | 3.38 (86) | 2.88 (73) | 1.31 (33) | 0.65 (17) | 0.16 (4.1) | 0.05 (1.3) | 0.06 (1.5) | 0.31 (7.9) | 0.92 (23) | 2.13 (54) | 2.91 (74) | 18.59 (472) |

== Demographics ==
Historical population
| Census | Pop. | Note | %± |
|---|---|---|---|
| 1960 | 2,205 | | — |
| 1970 | 3,721 | | 68.8% |
| 1980 | 10,959 | | 194.5% |
| 1990 | 17,483 | | 59.5% |
| 2000 | 59,984 | | 243.1% |
| 2010 | 153,015 | | 155.1% |
| 2020 | 176,124 | | 15.1% |
| 2025 (est.) | 185,007 | | 5.0% |
U.S. Decennial Census; 1860–1870 1880-1890; 1900 1910 1920; 1930 1940 1950; 1960 1970 1980; 1990 2000 2010; 2020

=== 2020 ===
Elk Grove city, California – Racial and ethnic composition Note: the US Census treats Hispanic/Latino as an ethnic category. This table excludes Latinos from the racial categories and assigns them to a separate category. Hispanics/Latinos may be of any race.
| Race / ethnicity (NH = Non-Hispanic) | Pop 2000 | Pop 2010 | Pop 2020 | % 2000 | % 2010 | % 2020 |
|---|---|---|---|---|---|---|
| White alone (NH) | 32,252 | 58,305 | 51,218 | 53.77% | 38.10% | 29.08% |
| Black or African American alone (NH) | 4,967 | 16,462 | 17,149 | 8.28% | 10.76% | 9.74% |
| Native American or Alaska Native alone (NH) | 370 | 507 | 521 | 0.62% | 0.33% | 0.30% |
| Asian alone (NH) | 10,392 | 39,479 | 58,036 | 17.32% | 25.80% | 32.95% |
| Pacific Islander alone (NH) | 336 | 1,731 | 2,446 | 0.56% | 1.13% | 1.39% |
| Other race alone (NH) | 237 | 350 | 1,141 | 0.40% | 0.33% | 0.65% |
| Mixed race or Multiracial (NH) | 3,032 | 8,600 | 12,221 | 5.05% | 5.62% | 6.94% |
| Hispanic or Latino (any race) | 8,398 | 27,581 | 33,392 | 14.00% | 18.03% | 18.96% |
| Total | 59,984 | 153,015 | 176,124 | 100.00% | 100.00% | 100.00% |

== Economy ==
=== Economic History ===
Elk Grove historically served as a crossroads for travelers during the California Gold Rush, connecting Sacramento, Stockton, and Monterey through the Monterey Trail. Businesses such as stage stops, including the Elk Grove House, opened which served travelers along the route.

The 1850s brought on increased demand in the region for agriculture given the booming population during the gold rush era. During this era, cattle and sheep were raised in the Sacramento Valley, and crops including wheat, barley, fruit, and nuts were grown. A number of ranches were established by families whose names to this day make up the names of streets, schools, and parks in the city, including the Sims Ranch, the Foulks Ranch, the Bond Ranch, the Erhardt Ranch, and the Mosher Ranch.

Between the late 1860s and early 1890s, Elk Grove's development continued, and a rail line connecting Sacramento and Stockton was built as part of the Central Pacific Railroad, boosting the ability for ranchers and farmers to transport their goods. A downtown area was built, with buildings such as churches and local stores were opened. During this era, more ranches were stablished, and agriculture in the area expanded to include more varieties of fruit, such as peaches, lemons, and prunes. The 1880s also saw the beginning of viniculture in the town, with at least 35 wine-grape growers.

In 1892, a fire destroyed buildings in Elk Grove and presented challenges to the young town, which worked to rebuild. In the aftermath of the fire, development slowed, but a number of businesses were established in the decades following, including a bank and a post office. Agriculture, including cattle ranching and winemaking, continued to be predominant in the local economy.

In the period from the Great Depression through the end of World War 2, the city's economy saw growth stagnate, with just two industries seeing growth: winemaking and the rise of the automobile.

In the postwar era, Elk Grove remained a small farming community on the outskirts of Sacramento, and did not see the same rapid suburban development as other areas. But by 1957, Highway 99 was expanded and led to increased construction in the town, and businesses such as the city's first shopping center opened in the early 1960s. A notable decline in the town's wine industry took place during this era, with wine-related businesses closing after decades of the booming nature of this industry in the area.

The following decades saw steady growth in the town, and by the 1980s, the area grew rapidly, with the population growing from 10,959 in the 1980 census to nearly 60,000 in the 2000 census.

In 2000, the city was incorporated, and development continued. 6,603 businesses were established within the city between 2000 and 2013, which included more than 29,000 jobs.

In 2007, just prior to the Great Recession, construction on a shopping mall began in Elk Grove to be the cornerstone of the city's retail, commercial, entertainment, and housing. But the 2008 recession caused progress to stall despite half-built buildings remaining on the grounds. By 2019, the half-built mall was torn down and entered the Wilton Rancheria, a local federally recognized Miwok tribe, who sought to build a casino on the land. The Sky River Casino opened just three years later, in 2022, and is expected to have a major economic impact to the city, and now ranks among one of the city's largest employers with 1,600 employees as of 2025.

=== Employers ===
Top 14 employers in Elk Grove in 2026
| # | Employer | # of Employees |
|---|---|---|
| 1 | Apple Inc. | 5,000 |
| 2 | Elk Grove Unified School District | 3,857 |
| 3 | CA Correctional Health Care Services | 1,437 |
| 4 | Walmart (3 locations) | 569 |
| 5 | Kaiser Permanente (2 locations) | 530 |
| 6 | Costco Wholesale Corporation | 400 |
| 7 | Raley's/Bel Air Markets | 378 |
| 8 | City of Elk Grove | 374 |
| 9 | Alldata LLC | 363 |
| 10 | Cosumnes Community Services District | 318 |
| 11 | Safeway (2 locations) | 252 |
| 12 | Trader Joe's | 100 |
| 13 | Whole Foods Market | 100 |
| 14 | Barnes & Noble | 60 |

== Arts and culture ==
=== Public libraries ===
The Elk Grove Public Library is located at 8900 Elk Grove Boulevard in a modern two-story building; it moved to this location in 2008 from its old building one block east. The library is part of the broader Sacramento Public Library system. The Elk Grove Library also serves neighboring communities such as Vineyard, Wilton, Sloughhouse, and Rancho Murieta. Additional local libraries supplement neighborhoods, such as the public Franklin High Library. The Elk Grove Public Library was the first free public library branch in California.

=== Events ===
Elk Grove is home to a number of long-running community events throughout the year. The Elk Grove Western Festival began in 1957, and celebrated the city's western roots with parades, fundraisers, and carnival games, with future California governor and U.S. president Ronald Reagan serving as Grand Marshall in 1966. Other major events in the city include the Giant Pumpkin Festival, held in autumn since 1994, where pumpkin growers showcase their multi-thousand pound pumpkins, and the Strauss Festival celebrating classical music and dance .

=== Media ===
The Elk Grove Citizen is a local weekly newspaper serving the community since 1909.

== Parks and recreation ==
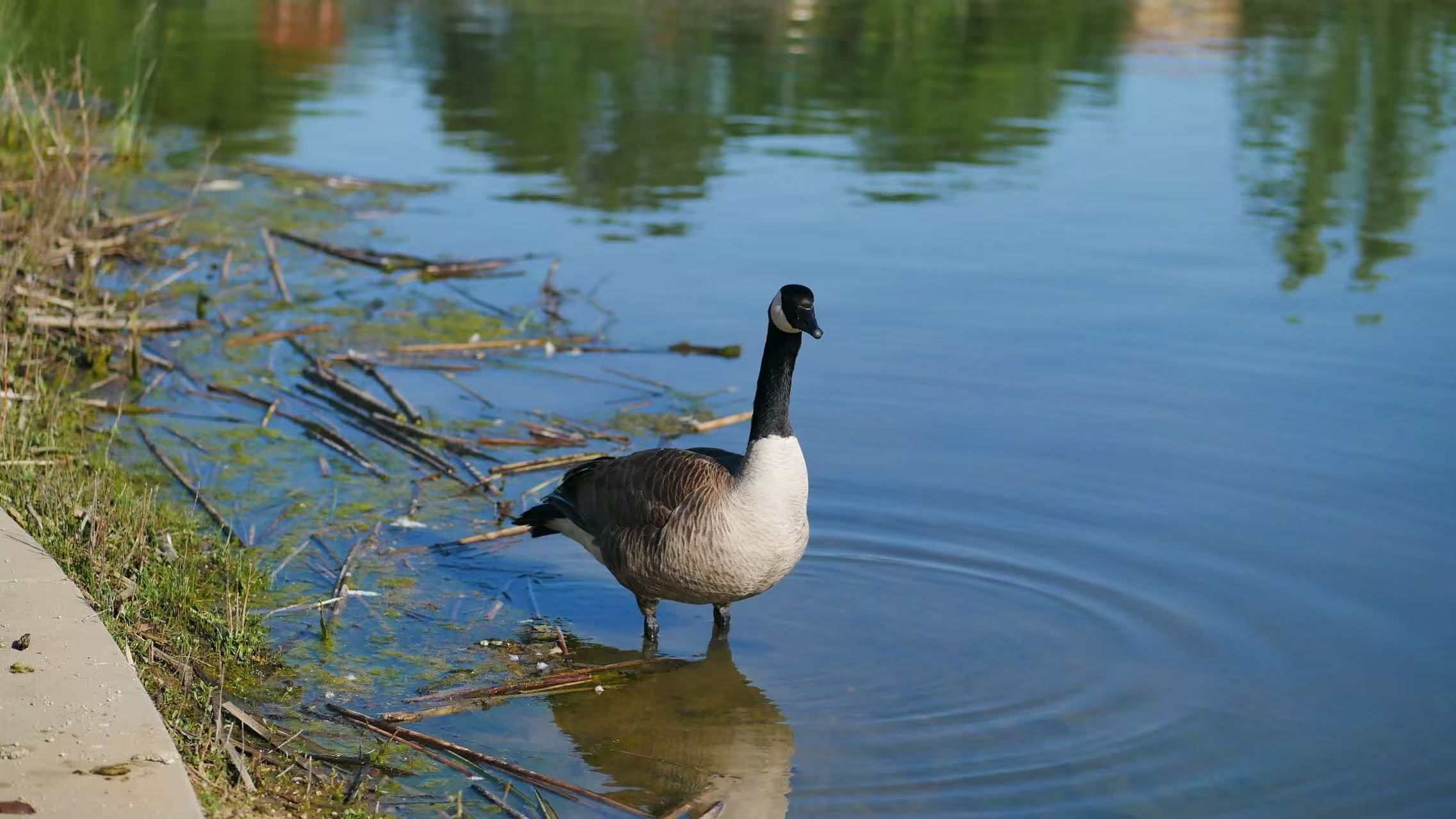
A Canada goose in a park in Elk Grove

The Cosumnes Community Services District owns and operates 106 parks, 12 water play areas, a golf course (Emerald Lake Golf Course), and a total of 18 miles of trails in Elk Grove, totaling up to 1,017 acres of green space. The parks are funded through assessments approved by a vote of property owners, called "Landscape and Lighting assessments", while property tax revenues do not fund park services.

== Government ==
Beginning in 2012, voters elect the mayor for a two-year term. Prior to 2012, the mayor's position was a one-year term and was chosen by the city council. The remaining four positions on the city council are elected by districts for four-year terms.

On November 8, 2016, Steve Ly became the second directly elected mayor following Gary Davis. He is the first ethnic Hmong mayor in the United States, having immigrated at the age of four with his family as refugees from Laos after the end of the Vietnam War. Currently, Bobbie Singh-Allen sits as mayor having defeated Ly in the 2020 election following Ly's controversial tenure. The remaining council members are Darren Suen (District 1), Rod Brewer (District 2), Kevin Spease (District 3) and Sergio Robles (District 4).

Elk Grove is in California's 7th congressional district, represented by Democrat Doris Matsui.

The Cosumnes Community Services District is the largest Community Services District in California and provides parks and recreation services and fire protection services in Elk Grove. Located in southern Sacramento County, the district covers 157 square miles (410 km^{2}).The board of directors is the governing body of the district and is composed of five duly-elected or appointed residents. At the beginning of each year, the board selects from its members a president and vice-president to serve during the ensuing year.

== Education ==
The Elk Grove Unified School District is the fifth largest school district in California and one of the fastest growing school districts in the nation. It also consistently ranks among the top school districts in the state. Located in southern Sacramento County, the district covers 320 square miles (830 km^{2}), one-third of the county. For the 2002–03 school year, the district served more than 52,500 students, and grew to 62,767 students in the 2016–2017 school year. Those students attend 40 elementary schools, 9 middle schools, 9 high schools and 7 alternative high schools.

There are also several private schools in town. Merryhill School offers kindergarten through 8th grade education, as well as private preschools. A local community college, Cosumnes River College, offers both career training and a transfer program to four-year universities, such as the CSU system and UC system across the state of California. Located nearby are California State University, Sacramento and the University of California, Davis. In 2013, California Northstate University College of Pharmacy, which offers a Doctor of Pharmacy degree program, relocated to Elk Grove (near Interstate 5).

== Infrastructure ==
=== Buses ===
Elk Grove is serviced by an E-tran, a fared bus system that traverses many of the city's main routes. SmaRT Ride is a free, on-demand, Sacramento Regional Transit District system for students that services main routes.

=== Rail ===
There are plans for SacRT to expand its light rail system two miles south from Cosumnes River College to Elk Grove Boulevard; however, these plans for a new light-rail station are currently in the planning phase.

Amtrak California Gold Runner inter-city rail and Altamont Corridor Express commuter rail were expected to be brought directly to Elk Grove in 2021, on the existing rail line which extends from Marysville in the north to Stockton in the south. In February 2024, Mayor Bobbie Singh-Allen announced that the City of Elk Grove had closed escrow on the new station property.

=== Highways ===
Interstate 5 and California State Route 99 run north to south and parallel with each other through the city. While I-5 runs next to Elk Grove's western city limits, SR 99 runs through the city center. I-5 and SR 99 are currently the only highway connections from Elk Grove to Sacramento, though an alternative local route is County Route J8 (Franklin Boulevard).

Currently there are plans for an expressway connection to connect I-5, SR 99 and US 50, called the Capital SouthEast Connector. Currently to get to US 50, traffic has to flow northward through Downtown Sacramento. This expressway will bypass downtown and connect to Highway 50 along with the cities of Rancho Cordova, Folsom, and El Dorado Hills.

== Notable people ==
- Arik Armstead (born 1993), defensive lineman for NFL's Jacksonville Jaguars
- Armond Armstead (born 1990), defensive tackle for CFL's Toronto Argonauts
- Ami Bera (born 1965), physician; U.S. Representative, 6th district, California
- Scott Boras (born 1952), baseball sports agent who was named "Most Powerful Sports Agent" in 2013 by Forbes
- Lance Briggs (born 1980), linebacker for NFL's Chicago Bears
- Ally Carda, 2020 Tokyo silver medalist in softball
- Dylan Carlson (born 1998), outfielder for the St. Louis Cardinals
- Bill Cartwright (born 1957), player and coach for NBA's Chicago Bulls
- J. D. Davis (born 1993), third baseman for the San Francisco Giants
- Cody Demps (born 1993), basketball player for Hapoel Be'er Sheva of the Israeli Basketball Premier League
- Earl Gage Jr. (ca. 1927–2017), firefighter
- Nabilai Kibunguchy (born 1998), soccer player
- Matt LaGrassa (born 1993), soccer player
- Kyle Larson (born 1992), NASCAR driver, 2021,2025 and 2026 NASCAR Cup Series champion
- Matt Manning, baseball player
- Tom McClintock, U.S. Representative, 5th District, California; former California state senator and assemblyman
- Jeremy Reeves, Grammy winning producer
- Saweetie, rapper
- Scott Smith (born 1979), mixed martial artist
- Tyler, the Creator (born 1991), rapper, songwriter, record producer
- Riley Voelkel (born 1990), actress
- Kenny Wiggins, lineman for NFL's Detroit Lions

== Sister cities ==
Elk Grove is a sister city of Concepción de Ataco in El Salvador.

== See also ==
- California Historical Landmarks in Sacramento County
- Elk Grove Citizen
