= Dean Lesher =

American newspaper publisher

- Born: August 4, 1903; Williamsport, Maryland
- Died: May 13, 1993 (aged 89); Orinda, California
- Known for: Newspaper publisher

Dean Stanley Lesher (August 4, 1903 – May 13, 1993) was an American newspaper publisher, founder of the Contra Costa Times and the Contra Costa Newspapers chain. He was also a well-known philanthropist in the San Francisco Bay Area.

== Early life ==
Lesher was born August 4, 1903, the son of Margaret and David I. Lesher, in Williamsport, Maryland. He had two sisters. His father Dr. D.I. Lesher practiced medicine in Williamsport for 62 years and was one of the oldest working physicians in the state at the time of his death at age 88.

His first business experience began when he opened a small ice cream stand at the age of 10. When he was 12, he gave that up for a job in a local tannery partially owned by his father. In his high school years Lesher found work as a railroad waybill clerk and was active in sports, playing football, baseball, and soccer.

Lesher attended the University of Maryland, graduating magna cum laude, and proceeded to earn a law degree from Harvard University. Upon graduation, he turned down several offers to practice law in New York and instead moved started a successful legal practice in Kansas City, Mo. During that time, he developed a lifelong friendship with future-president Harry S. Truman.

== Media career ==
Lesher ran a successful legal practice in Kansas City, Missouri, for 12 years before becoming fascinated with newspapers while representing them through his work. One of his clients was a principal owner of The Kansas City Star. In an interview, Lesher said: "He was buying daily newspapers for his four daughters. Frankly, I thought that two of his sons-in-law were not too bright, but they did remarkably well in the business and I thought, gee, if they could do it, maybe I could, too."

In 1938, with no prior experience or any connection to the industry, he purchased the Fremont Tribune, a small daily in Nebraska. Soon a rival paper called the Fremont Morning Guide started and the Tribune financially struggle. He decided the market in the area was shrinking and do to declining population and searched for a more lucrative location. During a trip to the Rose Bowl Game, an advertising manager with Montgomery Ward convinced him Merced, California, was the right city. In 1941, at the age of 39, Lesher and his family moved there after he purchasing the Merced Sun-Star. The sale price was $175,000. Later that year Lesher sold the Tribune to the owners of the Guide.

During World War II, Lesher faced a financial crisis as the local advertising declined. In response, he took 40 prominent shop owners to dinner and asked them to advertise to save the community newspaper. Most of the merchants responded favorably. In 1945, Lesher, bought Madera News and expanded it from a weekly to a daily. Lesher also bought a minority stake in the Madera Tribune. In 1947, Lesher, purchased the Walnut Creek Courier-Journal, his first paper in the Bay Area. In 1948, the Madera Tribune was put into receivership to settle the estate of the deceased former owner. The assets were then purchased at auction by Lesher for $30,750, who then consolidated the Tribune with the Madera News.

In 1951, Lesher purchased a larger space for the Walnut Creek paper's printing plant. On February 4, 1952, Lesher renamed the Courier-Journal to the Contra Costa Times. He soon expanded the weekly paper from a 1,000-circulation Pennysaver into a major daily in the Bay Area. In 1958, Lesher acquired the Antioch Daily Ledger. In 1961, Lesher acquired the Minidoka County News of Rupert and South Idaho Press, at that time called the Burley Herald-Bulletin. A year later purchased KBAR (AM), a local radio station. Lesher acquired the Contra Costa Sun in 1963. A year later Lesher moved his headquarters from Merced to Walnut Creek. He bought the Concord Transcript in 1966. He lost control of his two Idaho papers in 1967 after a court ordered they be returned to its previous owner due a contract dispute.

Lesher purchased the Atwater Signal in 1969, and Pittsburg Post-Dispatch in 1979. By 1983, Lesher owned 10 newspapers with nearly 500,000 readers. He employed over 1,200 people and his enterprises total worth was $150 million. He purchased the Gustine Standard, Los Banos Enterprise, Dos Palos Star and Firebaugh-Mendota Journal in 1984. Also in 1984, Lesher sold off his Idaho radio station. Lesher acquired The Healdsburg Tribune in 1985, The Roseville Press Tribune in 1988, The Folsom Telegraph and Orangevale News and in 1989.

In 1992, Lesher founded the Newman News in Newman, California. At that time, Forbes ranked Lesher among the 225 richest Americans, with a net worth of $360 million.

== Political aspirations ==
In 1943, Lesher was elected president of the Merced Chamber of Commerce. In 1944, Lesher declared his candidacy for state assemblyman for Merced and Madera counties. He suffered a crushing defeat to the incumbent in the primary. In 1954, Lesher declared his candidacy for California's 24th senate district. He got a distant second out of the six men running in the Republican primary.

== Awards and honors ==
In 1977, the California Press Association awarded Lesher with its "Publisher of the Year" award. In 1983, President Ronald Reagan presented Lesher with the highest award granted by the National Newspaper Association for distinguished leadership. In 2000, Lesher was posthumously inducted into the California Newspaper Hall of Fame.

== Family ==
In 1929, Lesher married Kathryn Estelle Crowder and had four children together named Dean Stanley II, Carolyn Lee, Melinda Kay and Cynthia Lesher. In 1971, Kathryn died of cancer. In 1973, Lesher remarried to Margaret Lois Ryan. The two remained married until his death in 1993 at the age of 90.

In 1997, Margaret Lesher drowned under mysterious circumstances, in Bartlett Lake, Arizona, while on a camping trip with her husband of six months, Collin "T.C." Thorstenson. Thorstenson was 30 years her junior and worked as a buffalo trainer on a rodeo circuit. A two day open casket memorial was held for Margaret at the Dean Lesher Regional Center for the Arts in Walnut Creek. Governor Pete Wilson read a eulogy.

Foul play was ruled out as she was legally drunk at the time of her death. Her estate blocked Thorstenson from inheriting $5 million in assets, arguing he lied to Margaret about his past marital history. Her total estate was worth $100 million. The two sides settled, and he only received her pension and 401(k) retirement account worth $750,000. Most of the estate largely went to charity under the provisions of the living trust.

== Death and legacy ==
On May 13, 1993, Lesher died at his home in Orinda, California, at age 90. George Riggs succeeded him as publisher of Lesher Newspapers Inc. At that time his widow Margaret Lesher was chairwoman of the board. Governor Pete Wilson spoke at his funeral.

=== Lesher Communications ===
In 1995, Lesher's heirs sold all his papers. The Contra Costa Times and its affiliates was sold to Knight-Ridder for $365 million. The Merced Sun-Star, Madera Tribune, and its affiliates were sold to USMedia Group, Inc., of Crystal City, Missouri. The Roseville Press Tribune, The Folsom Telegraph, and its affiliates were sold to Brehm Communications of San Diego.

=== Philanthropy ===
Lesher donated his time and money to several causes. He served on the Board of Governors of the California Community College System, and as a trustee of the California State University System, St. Mary's College, and John F. Kennedy University. The Dean and Kathryn Lesher Library at Merced Junior College, the Dean Lesher Regional Center for the Arts in Walnut Creek, California, and the Margaret Lesher Student Union Building of Diablo Valley College are named after his family.

The Dean & Margaret Lesher Foundation, established in 1989, continues to be administered by Lesher's heirs, and it grants millions of dollars annually for community improvement and educational scholarships.
