= The Galt Herald =

Weekly newspaper published in Galt, California

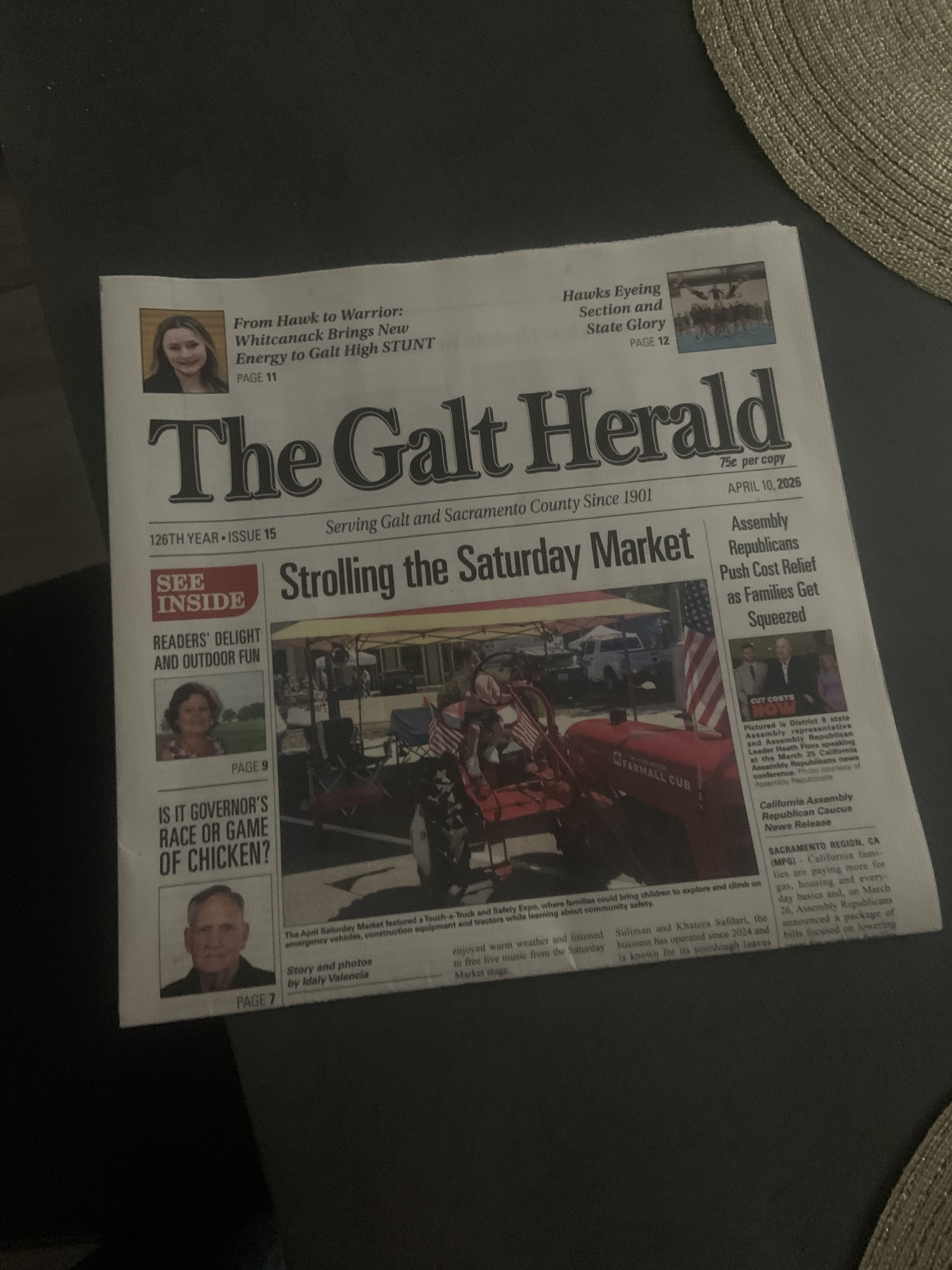
- Type: Weekly newspaper
- Owner: Messenger Publishing Group
- Founder: C. A. Cutting
- Publisher: Paul V. Scholl
- Editor: Sean P. Thomas
- Founded: 1904
- Language: English
- Headquarters: 604 N Lincoln Way, Galt, California 95632
- Sister newspapers: Elk Grove Citizen
- OCLC number: 26728201
- Website: galtherald.com

The Galt Herald is a weekly newspaper published in Galt, California.

== History ==
On January 7, 1904, C. A. Cutting published the first edition of The Weekly Witness in Galt. The paper was purchased by James Conley and William T. Botzbach in June 1907.

The name was changed to The Galt Herald in January 1911. Botzbach published the paper for 13 years before selling it in 1921 to Fred W. Wing. Wing published the paper for about 26 years. He wrote a column called "Foolin' Around With Fred" and was elected the first mayor of Galt when the town was incorporated in 1946. He sold the paper the following year to A E. Grube and Elmer Wolberd. Grube was a rancher who worked at a hardware store and Wolberd worked at a printing plant in Lodi. Wing resigned as mayor and from the city council shortly after the sale.

Twin brothers Shirley and Wayne Field purchased the paper on October 1, 1948. A few years later the paper was purchased by Henry R. Tweith. Five years later he purchased the Elk Grove Citizen.

In 1959, Tweith sold both papers to Roy Herburger. He operated the paper until he retired in 1999. The business was handed over to his son David Herburger. In 2021, Herburger Publications, Inc. sold its papers to Citizen managing editor Bonnie Rodriguez and her company Valley Oak Press. She sold the paper about two years later to Paul V. Scholl, owner of Messenger Publishing Group based in Carmichael.
