= Madera Tribune =

Newspaper published in Madera, California

The Madera Tribune
- Type: Twice-weekly newspaper
- Owner: Charles Doud
- Founder: Edgar Eugene Vincent
- Founded: March 21, 1885 (as the Madera Mercury)
- Political alignment: Conservative
- Language: English
- Headquarters: 2591 Mitchell Ct, Madera, California
- ISSN: 8750-9571
- OCLC number: 11964754
- Website: maderatribune.com

The Madera Tribune is a newspaper in Madera, California.

== History ==
On March 21, 1885, Edgar Eugene Vincent published the first edition of the Madera Mercury. It was a liberal Republican paper in a conservative Democratic area. On March 31, 1892, the Madera Tribune was founded by George A. Clark and Bell Marshall. William J. Deeter bought the Tribune in February 1893. Clark remained on as editor and bought the paper back a short time later.

In February 1912, a group of merchants withdrew their ads from the Mercury and boycotted the paper. In response, Vincent secured ads from businesses in Fresno and the boycott soon ended. In July 1913, Vincent suddenly left town and mysteriously disappeared. The paper was then in the hands of his wife M.J. Vincent and son, who in the paper wrote: "The 'Boss' has gone." Later that year she sold the Mercury to G.L. Olds, former publisher of the Porterville Daily Messenger. Olds was joined several months later by Ernest N. White, former co-owner of the Escondido Times-Advocate.

In October 1920, White sold the Mercury to Fred A. Wreslan, a former co-owner of the Bend Bulletin in Oregon. A month later it was sold again to D.H. Rothe. In May 2021, L.W. Sharp and D.R. Hanart acquired the Mercury. In 1925, George A. Clark and his son and Howard A. Clark, owners of the Tribune, bought the Mercury from Sharp and Hanart. The papers were then merged to form the Madera Mercury-Tribune. In 1945, Dean Lesher, owner of the Merced Sun-Star bought Madera News from Everett B. Peck, who published it for a dozen years, and expanded it from a weekly to a daily. Lesher also bought a minority stake in the Tribune.

In 1948, the Tribune was put into receivership to settle the estate of the late Clark. The assets were then purchased at auction by Lesher for $30,750, who then consolidated the Tribune with the Daily News to form the News-Tribune. Howard Clark discussed plans to start a new paper called the Madera Advocate, and sued Lesher over the Tribune sale, but lost multiple court battles

At some point the paper was renamed back to the Tribune. Lesher died in 1993. Two years later, Lesher Newspapers, Inc. sold the Tribune, Merced Sun-Star and several other papers to USMedia Group, Inc., of Crystal City, Missouri. At that time the paper had a circulation around 9,000. A few year's later the paper's former publisher Fred Ward started a rival weekly freesheet called the Madera County Times. The Tribune was managed by USMedia's subsidiary Pacific Sierra Publishing Co., which sold the paper in 2004 to a group of local investors led by editor Charles Doud. At that time the circulation has dwindled to 5,000.

== Editorial stance ==
On the newspaper's website, the paper cites a quote by conservative activist and consultant Stephen Frank, saying "The Madera Tribune is one of the last true conservative newspapers in California."
