= The Placer Herald =

Weekly newspaper published in Grass Valley, California

- Type: Weekly newspaper
- Owner: Alta Newspaper Group
- Founder: Tabb Mitchell
- Publisher: John Love
- Editor: Bill Poindexter
- Founded: 1852
- Language: English
- City: Rocklin, California
- OCLC number: 29211207
- Website: placerherald.com

The Placer Herald is a weekly newspaper in Rocklin, California.

== History ==
On Sept. 11, 1852, the first issue of The Placer Herald was published by Tabb Mitchell in Auburn, California. The press Mitchell used was originally owned by The California Star, the first English-language newspaper published in the state. The business venture was funded by the owners of the Marysville Express who cut ties after one or two issues. A few months later Mitchell brought on his brother Charles H. Mitchell, who went on to own the Grass Valley Union. The two worked together until fall 1858. James Anderson briefly became a co-owner for a year.

In 1867, Mitchell sold the paper to Joseph Walkup. William H. Smith was a co-owner for about two years and J.A. Filcher became a partner in 1872. Walkup published the paper until his death in 1873. Filcher was left as the paper's sole manager for three years until Walkup's widow sold her half-interest in 1876 to J.H. Gregory and A.C. Kinkade. That half-share was sold several times until Filcher gained full ownership in 1879. He then leased the paper several times over the next two decades. He retired from management in 1896 and at that time the Herald was operated by his son George Filcher and Frank L. Sanders.

W.R. Monahan leased the paper at some point. He retired in January 1899 and was succeeded by O.F. Seavey. In February 1900, Filcher sold the Herald to W.A. Shepard. He published the paper four 44 years until his death in February 1944. C.D. LeMaster bought the paper from his estate in May 1944. The paper was then bought by W.J. Chamberlin in July 1944, Allen G. Thurman (owner of The Colfax Record) in August 1944, Douglas P. Campbell in 1952, and Joe Hughes in 1961. Mrs. Joan A. Grenier bought the paper from Hughes in 1963 for $10,000 and merged it with the Placer Representative News. In January 1966, Mary Tibbits, owner of The Davis Enterprise, took over the paper.

In April 1966, W.J. Brehm, owner of the Auburn Journal, bought the Herald. The paper then relocated to Rocklin. In December 2022, the Herald was one of six newspapers published by Gold Country Media, a subsidiary of Brehm Communications, sold to Gold Mountain Media, a subsidiary of Alta Newspaper Group.
