= Galt Joint Union Elementary School District =

School district in California, United States

Address
- 1018 C Street Galt, California, 95632; United States

District information
- Type: Public
- Grades: K–8
- NCES District ID: 0614790

Students and staff
- Students: 3,332 (2020–2021)
- Teachers: 172.27 (FTE)
- Staff: 238.17 (FTE)
- Student–teacher ratio: 19.34:1

Other information
- Website: www.galt.k12.ca.us

Galt Joint Union Elementary School District is a public school district based in Sacramento County, California, United States.
