= The Roseville Press Tribune =

Weekly newspaper published in Roseville, California

Roseville Press Tribune
- Type: Weekly newspaper
- Owner: Alta Newspaper Group
- Founder: Y.G. Freeman
- Publisher: John Love
- Editor: Bill Poindexter
- Founded: 1906 (as the Roseville Register)
- Language: English
- Headquarters: 1030 High Street, Auburn, California, United States
- City: Roseville, California
- Sister newspapers: Auburn Journal
- OCLC number: 33201532
- Website: rosevillepresstribune.com

The Roseville Press Tribune is weekly newspaper in Roseville, California.

== History ==
On March 15, 1906, Y.G. "Bud" Freeman published the first edition of the Roseville Register. A few months later C.W. Anderson, editor of the Loyaltonian, bought an interest in the paper and later became its sole owner in 1907.

On July 10, 1908, The Roseville Tribune was first published by J.C. Crome and H.I. Beecroft. A year later Samuel E. DeRackin became a part-owner. DeRackin left later that year and was succeeded by A.P. Bettersworth. In October 1909, a bank foreclosed on the printing plant and sold it at auction for $50, several hundred dollars less than the amount of the mortgage.

In June 1914, A.J. Harder became editor and manager of the Register. He was sued for libel in August 1918 by Frank L. Sanders, owner of the Auburn Journal, after accusing him of stealing $600 from the county. Sanders sought $10,000 in damages. In January 1922, Harder sold the Register to W.W.B. Seymour and his sister Elizabeth Seymour. But ownership soon returned to Harder who sold the paper again that March to W.F. Due and W.L. Davis Jr.

J.V. Van Eaton sometime around March 1919 became owner of the Tribune. In March 1920, Frederick R. Brill bought the Tribune from Van Eaton. At that time his brother William C. Brill owned the Elk Grove Citizen. In March 1923, Tribune owner Brill bought the subscriber list of the Roseville Register from Will. F. Due who moved his planting plant from Roseville to Oak Park to start the Oak Park Times. Brill then renamed his paper to the Roseville Tribune and Register. Fred Brill died in 1929 and the paper was then managed by his son Ronald F. Brill and his widow Nellie Brill.

In November 1929, Bill Due and Sydney "Sid" H. Roche founded The Roseville Press. A year later Roche sold the paper to Fred J. Smith and Don J. Stauffer. In September 1941, Fred J. Green was elected president of Roseville Press Inc., and became the paper's editor and general manager. In 1938, Nellie Brill sold her stake in the Tribune and Register to Edwin H. Wilder. In April 1942, Fred J. Green, owner of the Roseville Daily Press, and Ronald F. Brill, owner of the Roseville Tribune and Register, merged their papers together to form the Roseville Press Tribune. The consolidation was done as a wartime conservation measure during World War II. Green was called to active duty as a Navy Lieutenant during the war.

The paper was then purchased by Milton P. Kjer and R.E. Blankenburg in December 1943; Ardle C. Pierce and Frank E. Sevrens in May 1950; a group of investors from Oregon and California in September 1968; the Small Newspaper Group of Kankakee, Illinois in August 1981; and Lesher Communications in December 1988. At that time the paper's circulation was 15,000 and it published six days a week. In October 1995, Brehm Communications of San Diego acquired the paper. In December 2022, the Press Tribune was one of six newspapers published by Gold Country Media, a subsidiary of Brehm, sold to Gold Mountain Media, a subsidiary of Alta Newspaper Group.
