= List of neighbourhoods in Hamilton, Ontario =

In 2001, the new city of Hamilton was formed. The Regional Municipality of Hamilton-Wentworth and its six local municipalities; Ancaster, Dundas, Flamborough, Glanbrook, Hamilton and Stoney Creek amalgamated. (January 1) Before amalgamation, the "old" City of Hamilton was made up of 100 neighbourhoods. Today in the new megacity, there are over 200 designated neighbourhoods. The first four neighbourhoods in Hamilton were Beasley, Central, Durand and Corktown. Below is a list of some of the more noteworthy neighbourhoods found in the city of Hamilton:

== Lower City (below Escarpment) ==
- Ainslie Wood is centred on Alexander Park and located near McMaster University. It is bordered to the north by Main Street and Dundas, to the south and east by Highway 403, and to the west by Dundas and Ancaster.
- Bartonville
- Hamilton Beach
- Beasley, named after Richard Beasley (1761-1842), soldier, political figure, farmer and businessman in Upper Canada.
- Blakely
- Central, which encompasses the downtown core along with the site of Hess Village and Jamesville.
- Chedoke Park B
- Cherry Heights
- Community Beach
- Cootes Paradise A
- Cootes Paradise B
- Corktown, Historically Irish neighborhood between James and Wellington streets, south of Main Street.
- Corman, Bound by King Street, Queenston Road, Nash Road, and The Red Hill Valley Parkway.
- Crown Point East
- Crown Point West
- Delta East
- Delta West, where King and Main Streets (normally parallel) intersect.
- Dundas
- Durand, historically was home to the 'industrialists'. This south of downtown neighbourhood is quite possibly the largest concentration of early 20c castles/mansions in Canada. The grand homes were home to the families whose names graced the signs of the north end factories. Named after James Durand, businessman and political figure in Upper Canada. (Hamilton)
- Gibson, named after Hamiltonian, Sir John Morison Gibson, (1842-1929), who was Lieutenant Governor of Ontario from 1908 to 1914.
- Glenview East
- Glenview West
- Grayside
- Greenford
- Greenhill
- Homeside
- International Village
- Keith (Burlington and Wentworth area)
- Kirkendall North
- Kirkendall South
- Lakely
- Landsdale
- McQuesten East, named after Thomas McQuesten, (1882-1948), lawyer, politician and government appointee who helped McMaster University to relocate from Toronto to west Hamilton in 1930.
- McQuesten West
- Nashdale
- Normanhurst
- The North End
- Parkview East
- Parkview West
- Red Hill
- Riverdale East
- Riverdale West
- Rockton, Ontario
- Rosedale (bound by the Escarpment, Lawrence, Red Hill Express, Kenilworth)
- St. Clair
- Stinson, Named after Thomas Stinson, (1798-1864), merchant, banker, landowner. He was an extensive landowner in not only in Hamilton but as well as Chicago, St. Paul, Minnesota, and Superior City, Wisconsin, which he named.
- Stipeley
- Stoney Creek, (locally known as the "Crick" or "Tony Creek" from its large Italian population. In recent years first generation Indian and Pakistani immigrants have largely settled in Stoney Creek.)
- Strathcona
- Vincent, Named after John Vincent, (1764-1848), British army officer in the Battle of Stoney Creek, War of 1812.
- Westdale, originally an upper-class, master-planned neighbourhood from the 1920s, that forbade eastern Europeans, Jews and people of colour from residing there. In later years it became a Jewish neighbourhood with one of Hamilton's three Jewish synagogues. (Another is in nearby Ainslie Wood.) Built around oval streets that surround the centre Westdale Village.
- Winona
- Winona Park

== Mountain (Escarpment) ==
- Allison
- Ancaster Village
- Ainslie Wood
- Albion Falls
- Balfour, named after James Balfour, (1854-1917), architect, Canada Life Assurance Company building at corner of King & James (1883), City Hall on corner of James & York (1888). The Balfour neighbourhood on the Hamilton Mountain was named after him. It is bounded by Fennell Avenue East (north), Mohawk Road East (south), Upper James Street (west) and Upper Wellington Street (east). Notable landmarks in this neighbourhood include the Mountain Plaza Mall and Norwood Park.
- Barnstown
- Berrisfield
- Binbrook
- Birdland, a neighborhood on the central mountain where all the streets have been named after local birds.
- Bonnington
- Broughton East
- Broughton West
- Bruleville
- Buchanan, named after Isaac Buchanan, businessman and political figure in Canada West (Hamilton).
- Burkhome
- Butler, named after Richard Butler, (1834-1925), editor, publisher, journalist.
- Carpenter
- Centremount
- Chapel East
- Chapel West
- Crerar, named after Harry Crerar, who was a Canadian general and the country's "leading field commander" in World War II.
- Duff's Corners, named after Lockhart Duff, (1793-1858), landowner, his house was demolished at this site to make way for a service station.
- Eastmount
- Eleanor
- Elfrida
- Falkirk East
- Falkirk West
- Fessenden, named after Clementina Trenholme, (1844-1918), Clementina (Fessenden) Trenholme, author, social organizer. Also, mother of Reginald Fessenden, the radio pioneer. Had two neighbourhoods named after her, Fessenden and Trenholme, both on the Hamilton Mountain.
- Flamborough
- Gilbert
- Gilkson
- Mount Hope, (site of John C. Munro International Airport).
- Gourley
- Greeningdon
- Greensville
- Gurnett
- Hampton Heights
- Hannon North
- Hannon South
- Hannon West
- Harmony Hall
- Heritage Green
- Hill Park
- Huntington
- Inch Park, named after Adam Inch, (1857-1933), dairy farmer, politician.
- Jerome
- Kennedy
- Kernighan, named after Robert Kirkland Kernighan, (1854-1926), poet, journalist.
- King's Forest Upper
- Lawfield
- Leckie Park, named after Campbell Leckie, (1848-1925), engineer.
- Lisgar
- Macassa
- Meadowlands
- Mewburr
- Mountview
- Millgrove
- Mohawk
- North Glanford
- Oakhill
- Pleasant Valley
- Quinndale
- Raleigh
- Randall
- Rolston
- Rushdale
- Ryckman's, One of two neighbourhoods named after Samuel Ryckman, (1777-1846), farmer, surveyor. Constructed a log house and a barn on the present-day Ryckmans Corners.
- Ryckman's Corners, One of two neighbourhoods named after Samuel Ryckman, (1777-1846), farmer, surveyor. Constructed a log house and a barn on the present-day Ryckmans Corners.
- Rymal Station
- Sherwood
- Southam, named after William Southam, (1843-1932), publisher, philanthropist.
- Sunninghill
- Templemead
- Thorner
- Trenholme, named after Clementina Trenholme, (1844-1918), Clementina (Fessenden) Trenholme, author, social organizer. Also, mother of Reginald Fessenden, the radio pioneer. Had two neighbourhoods named after her, Fessenden and Trenholme, both on the Hamilton Mountain.
- Twenty Place
- Waterdown
- West Flamborough
- Westcliffe
- Yeoville
