= Bartonville =

Bartonville can refer to:

- Bartonville, Texas
- Bartonville, Illinois
- Bartonville, Missouri
- Bartonville, Ontario, List of neighbourhoods in Hamilton, Ontario
