= Emma Webster =

Emma Webster may refer to:

- Emma Webster, better known as Granny (Looney Tunes), a Warner Bros. Cartoons character
- Emma Webster (artist), British-American painter
