= Smithville Christian High School =

Location
- 6488 Smithville Road, P.O. Box 40; Smithville, Ontario, L0R 2A0; Canada; 43.0906°N 79.5559°W

Information
- School type: high school
- Religious affiliation: Independent Christian
- Founded: 1980
- Principal: Fred Breukelman
- Grades: 9 - 12
- Language: English
- Team name: Storm
- Website: smithvillechristian.ca

Smithville Christian High School is an independent Christian secondary school in Smithville, Ontario. It was established in 1980 as an extension of Hamilton District Christian High School. It is a member of the Ontario Alliance of Christian Schools.

== See also ==
- Education in Ontario
- List of secondary schools in Ontario
