= Mount Hope, Ontario =

Community in Hamilton, Ontario

Mount Hope
- Urban area
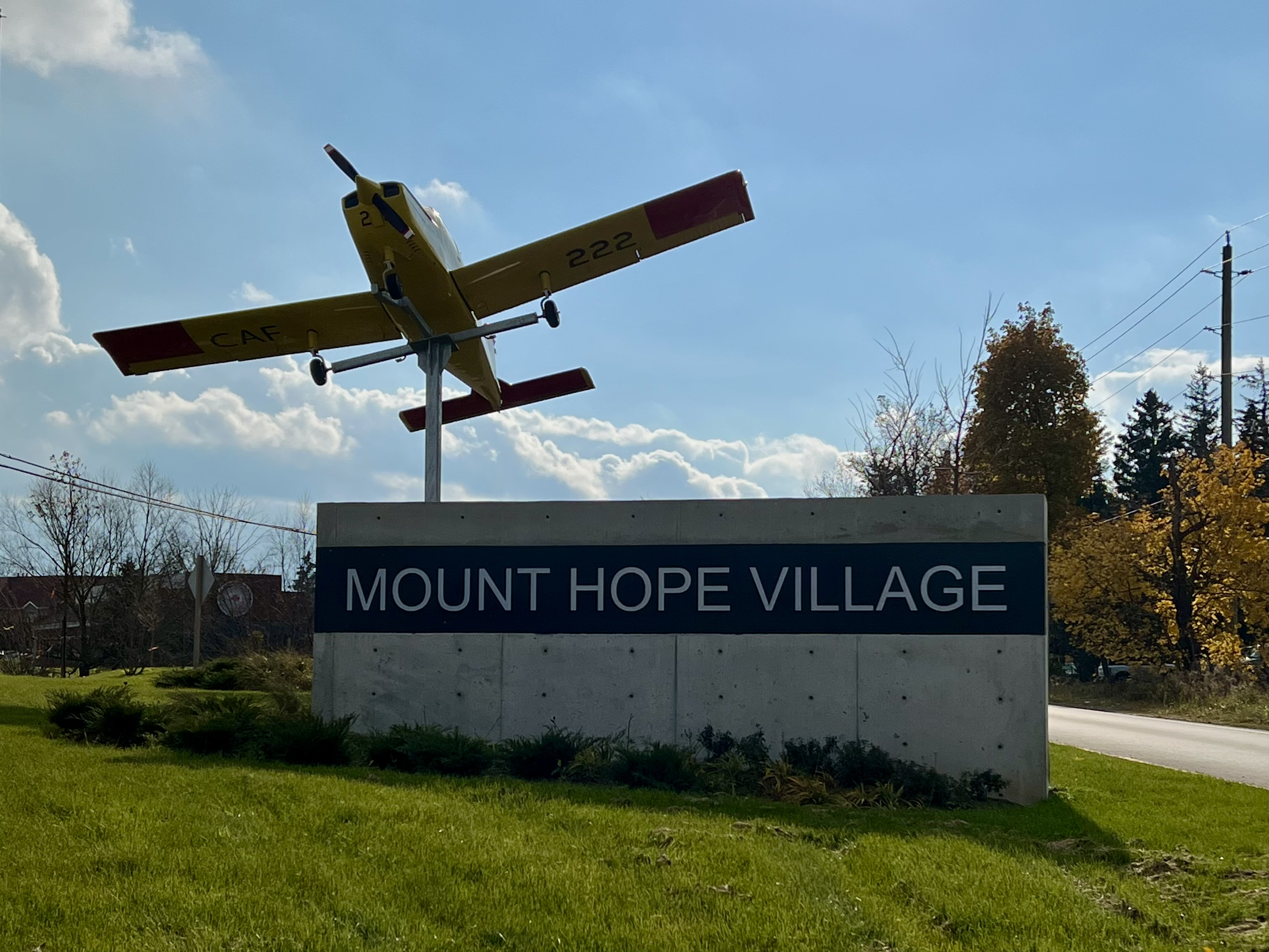
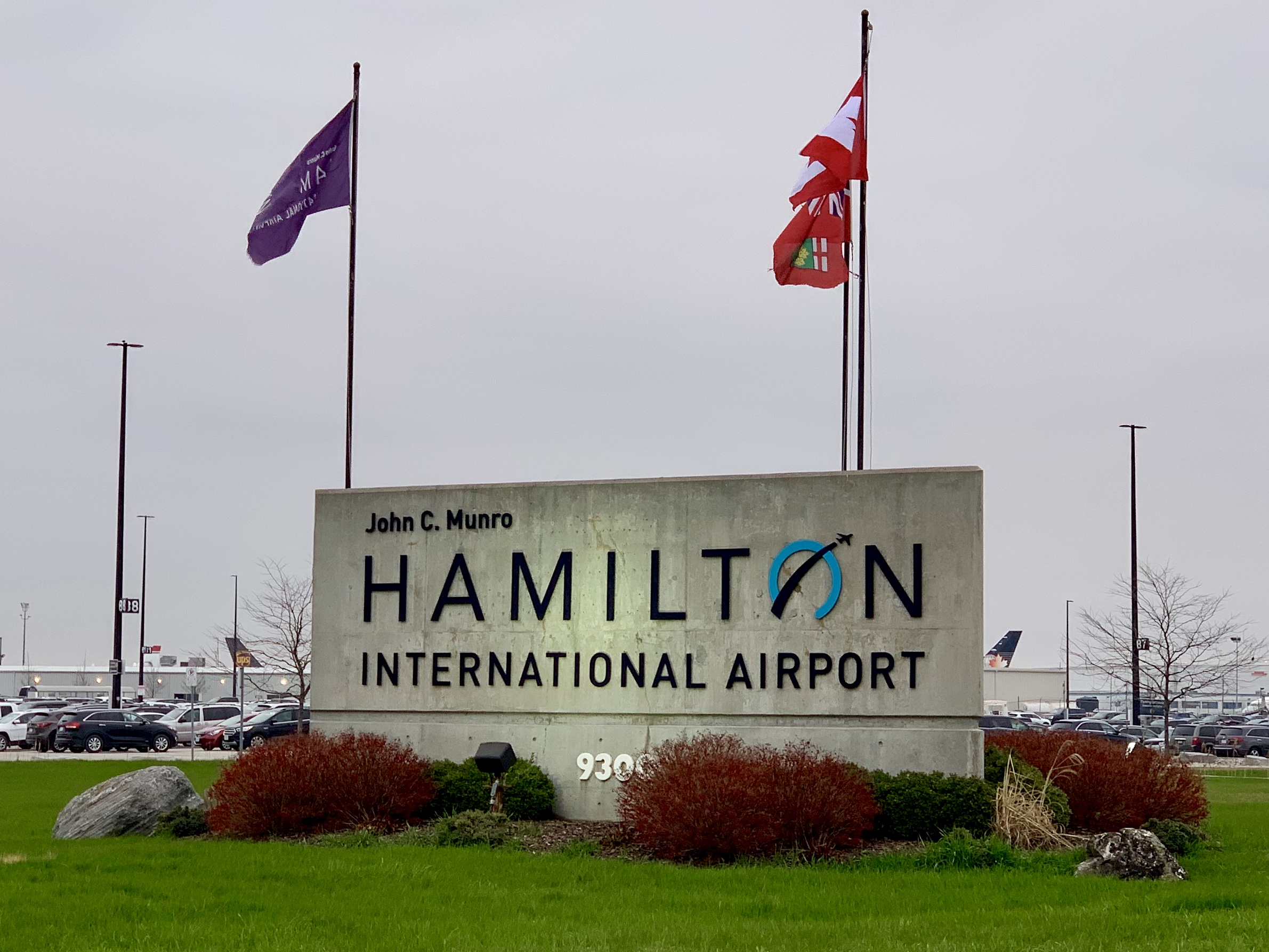
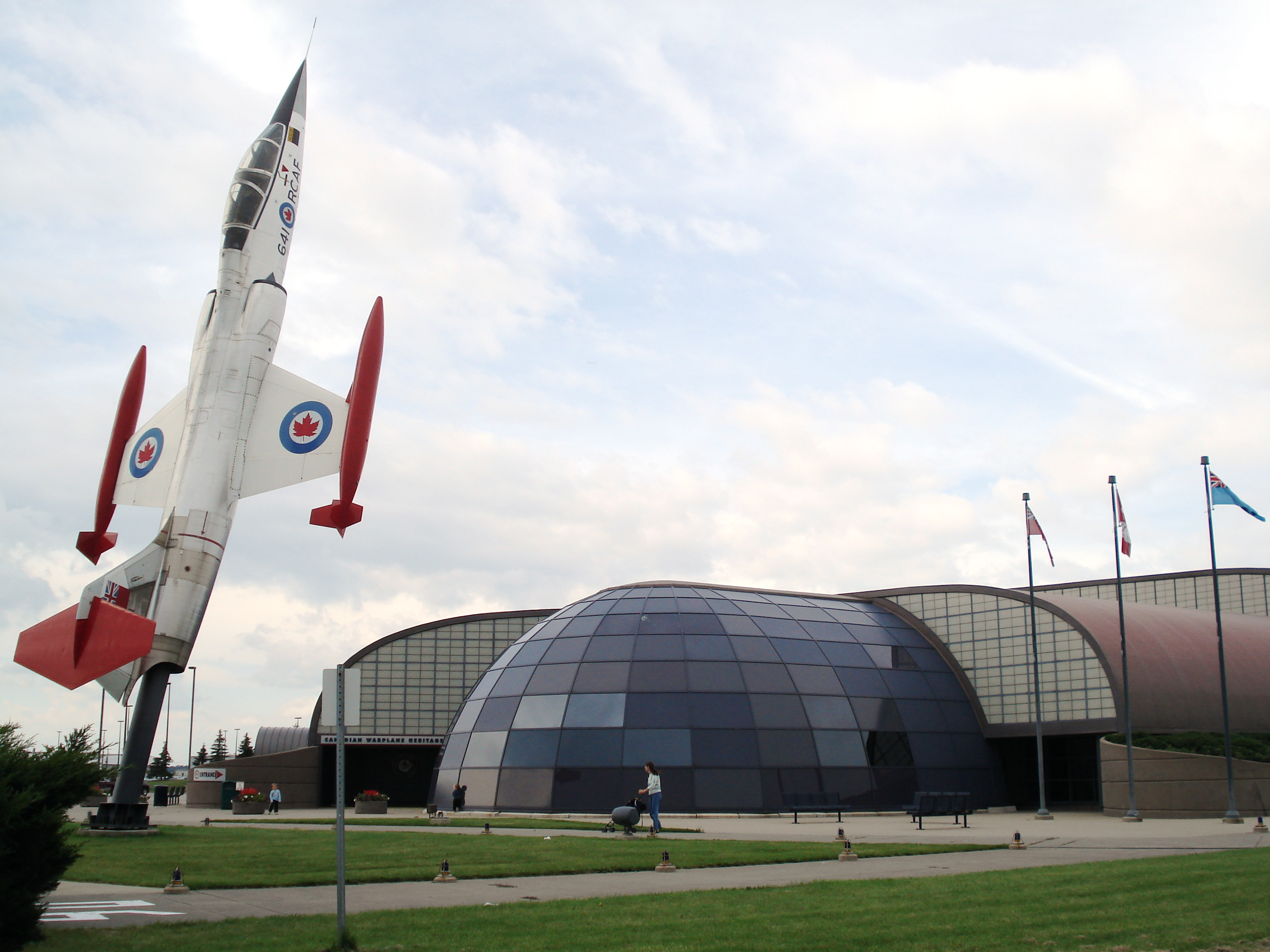
- Mount Hope Village Sign John C. Munro Hamilton International Airport Canadian Warplane Heritage Museum
- Interactive map of Mount Hope
- Coordinates: 43.156°N 79.915°W
- Country: Canada
- Province: Ontario
- City: Hamilton
- Established: 1800s
- Integrated: 1974; 52 years ago (Township of Glanbrook)
- Amalgamated: January 1, 2001; 25 years ago

Government
  - MP: Lisa Hepfner
  - MPP: Monique Taylor
- Time zone: UTC−05:00 (EST)
  - Summer (DST): UTC−04:00 (EDT)
- Forward sortation area: L0R and L9B
- Area codes: 905, 289, and 365

Mount Hope is a community in the city of Hamilton in the Canadian province of Ontario. It is located in the geographic township of Glanford which amalgamated with Binbrook in 1974 to form Glanbrook. On January 1, 2001, Glanbrook was amalgamated with Hamilton, Flamborough, Ancaster, Dundas and Stoney Creek to form an enlarged Hamilton.

The John C. Munro Hamilton International Airport and the Canadian Warplane Heritage Museum are located in Mount Hope.

== Demographics ==
In the 2021 Census of Population conducted by Statistics Canada, Mount Hope had a population of 2,413 living in 708 of its 712 total private dwellings, a change of 1.9% from its 2016 population of 2,368. With a land area of 1.44 km^{2} (0.56 sq mi), it had a population density of 1,675.7/km^{2} (4,340.0/sq mi) in 2021.
