= West Lincoln =

- Township (lower-tier)
- Township of West Lincoln
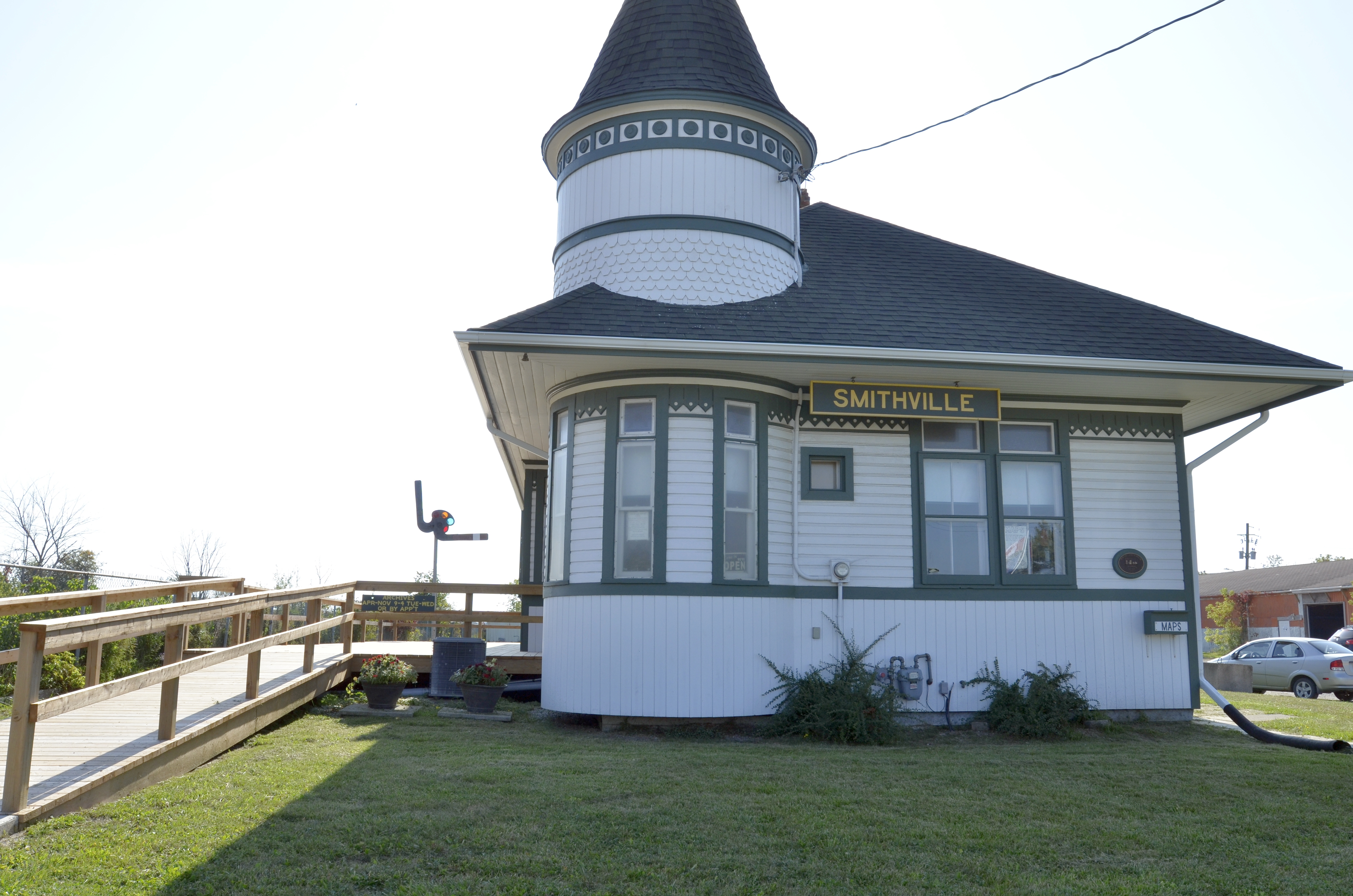
- Train station in Smithville
- Motto: Industry, Progress, Agriculture
- Location within Regional Municipality of Niagara Location within Southern Ontario
- Coordinates: 43°04′N 79°34′W
- Country: Canada
- Province: Ontario
- Region: Niagara

Government
  - Mayor: Cheryl Ganann
  - Federal riding: Niagara West
  - Prov. riding: Niagara West

Area
  - Land: 387.81 km^{2} (149.73 sq mi)
- Elevation: 181 m (594 ft)

Population (2016)
  - Total: 14,500
  - Density: 37.4/km^{2} (97/sq mi)
- Time zone: UTC-5 (EST)
  - Summer (DST): UTC-4 (EDT)
- Postal Code: L0R
- Area codes: 905, 289, 365, and 742
- Website: www.westlincoln.ca

West Lincoln is a township in the Niagara Region of Ontario, Canada. Main urban areas are located along the former provincial Highway 20. The administrative centre of West Lincoln is the community of Smithville, situated halfway between Hamilton and Pelham.

== Communities ==
The township comprises the communities of Abingdon, Allens Corner, Attercliffe, Basingstoke, Bismark, Boyle, Caistor Centre, Caistorville, Elcho, Fulton, Grassie, Kimbo, Port Davidson, Rosedene, Silverdale, Smithville, St. Anns, Vaughan, Warner, Wellandport, Wilcox Corners and Winslow.

== Business ==
Retail establishments in Smithville are congregated amongst two major nodes: the downtown core, and the Village Square Mall.

Smithville also has a Farmers Market that runs every Friday afternoon in the summer. The market features a carefully selected variety of vendors showcasing local produce, preserves, meat, honey, flowers and baking.

== Demographics ==
Historical population
| Year | Pop. | ±% |
|---|---|---|
| 1991 | 10,864 | — |
| 1996 | 11,513 | +6.0% |
| 2001 | 12,268 | +6.6% |
| 2006 | 13,167 | +7.3% |
| 2011 | 13,837 | +5.1% |
| 2016 | 14,500 | +4.8% |
| 2021 | 15,454 | +6.6% |

In the 2021 Census of Population conducted by Statistics Canada, West Lincoln had a population of 15,454 living in 5,295 of its 5,422 total private dwellings, a change of 6.6% from its 2016 population of 14,500. With a land area of 387.02 km^{2} (149.43 sq mi), it had a population density of 39.9/km^{2} (103.4/sq mi) in 2021.

== Municipal government ==
The Council of West Lincoln is composed of a mayor and six councillors/aldermen who serve for a term of four years. The mayor is elected at large and the councillors are elected by ward. The town is divided into three wards with two councillors elected in each ward.

The mayor is Cheryl Ganann. Councillors and alderman include:

- Ward 1: Mike Rehner and Jason Trombetta
- Ward 2: Shelly Ann Bradaric and Joanne Chechalk
- Ward 3: Greg Maychak and William Reilly
- Regional Councillor: Albert Witteveen

== See also ==
- List of townships in Ontario
