= Lockhart Duff =

Lockhart Duff (1792, in Scotland – 11 February 1858, in Hamilton, Ontario) was a Landowner. He came to Canada in 1830 when he left Scotland in financial straits. He owned 250 acres (1.0 km^{2}) in Dundas which ran from Main Street to the base of the Niagara Escarpment.

Duff carried a name that originated with the marriage in 1666 of Jane Lockhart of the prominent Baronial family to William Duff, Provost of Inverness. The first Lockhart Duff was born in 1694 and the name has been carried on to the present along the same direct lineage.

== Tribute ==
Duff's Corners, a neighbourhood in Ancaster; Hamilton, Ontario was named after him. It is centered on Garner Road West and Wilson Street (Ancaster) West. Landmarks in area include Oak Gables Golf Club & Driving Range.
