= Emma Webster (artist) =

- Education: Stanford University; Yale School of Art
- Known for: Painting; constructed and virtual landscapes
- Website: emmawebster.com

Emma Webster is a British-American painter known for large-scale, imaginary landscapes developed from hand-built and virtual dioramas. Her works combine theatrical lighting, art-historical references, and digital modeling with oil painting. Webster lives and works in Los Angeles.

== Early life and education ==
Webster studied Art Practice at Stanford University, receiving a Bachelor of Arts in 2011. Webster earned a Master of Fine Arts in painting from Yale University in 2018. After Stanford, she interned at the La Jolla Playhouse, an experience she has cited as formative to her interest in constructed spaces and theatrical illusion.

== Artistic practice ==
Webster's oil paintings portray invented landscapes with dislocated horizons, exaggerated or doubled light sources, saturated greens, and ambiguous natural forms. Her images draw on artists including William Blake, Hieronymus Bosch, Claude Lorrain, John Martin, J. M. W. Turner, and the traditions of Romantic and Hudson River School landscape painting.

At Yale, Webster made observational paintings of constructed dioramas. In 2018, her Stanford classmate and virtual-reality artist Wyatt Roy scanned her source maquettes for an exploratory video game, and inspired her to start sculpting with an Oculus. Webster subsequently taught herself digital modeling, including Blender, and developed a process of sculpting and lighting spaces from within virtual reality. She then paints the digitally scenes by hand, retaining inconsistencies and distortions that occur during the translation.

== Career ==
Webster's exhibitions have been reviewed in publications including The New York Times W Magazine ARTnews The New Yorker, Los Angeles Times, Artforum International, Vanity Fair,Cultured Magazine, Artillery Magazine, and Artsy; her paintings have appeared in Harper's Magazine, New American Paintings, and Jana Prikryl's Midwood (cover). In 2022, she was the recipient of the Jericho Fellowship, Venice Italy.

== Solo exhibitions ==
- 2026 - Rues and Leaves Themselves Alone, Petzel, New York NY
- 2025 - That Thought Might Think, Petzel, New York NY
- 2025 - Vapors, Perrotin, Hong Kong
- 2024 - The Engine of Beasts, Perrotin, Paris France
- 2023 - Enough Ecstasy, Perrotin, Art Basel, Miami FL
- 2023 - Intermission, Jeffery Deitch, Los Angeles CA
- 2023 - The Dolmens, Perrotin, Tokyo Japan
- 2022 - Illuminarium, Perrotin, Dosan Park, Seoul South Korea
- 2021 - Ready the Lanterns!, Stems Gallery, Brussels Belgium
- 2021 - Green Iscariot, Alexander Berggruen, New York NY

== Notable collections ==
- Centre Pompidou, Paris
- Los Angeles County Museum of Art (LACMA)
- Institute of Contemporary Art, Miami, Fla.
- Pérez Art Museum, Miami
- The Warehouse, Dallas
- Columbus Museum of Art
- Museum of Contemporary Art San Diego
- Long Museum, Shanghai, China
- Yuz Museum Shanghai, China
- Xiao Museum, Rizhao, China
- Groeninghe Art Collection, Bruges, Belgium
- Museu Inimá de Paula, Belo Horizonte, Brazil

== Books ==
- Decimate, 2025, Petzel
- Emma Webster, 2024, Perrotin
- Emma Webster: Green Iscariot, 2021, Alexander Berggruen
- Lonescape: Green, Painting and Mourning Reality, 2021, Emma Webster
