= Mohawk Road (Hamilton, Ontario) =

Arterial road in Hamilton, Ontario, Canada

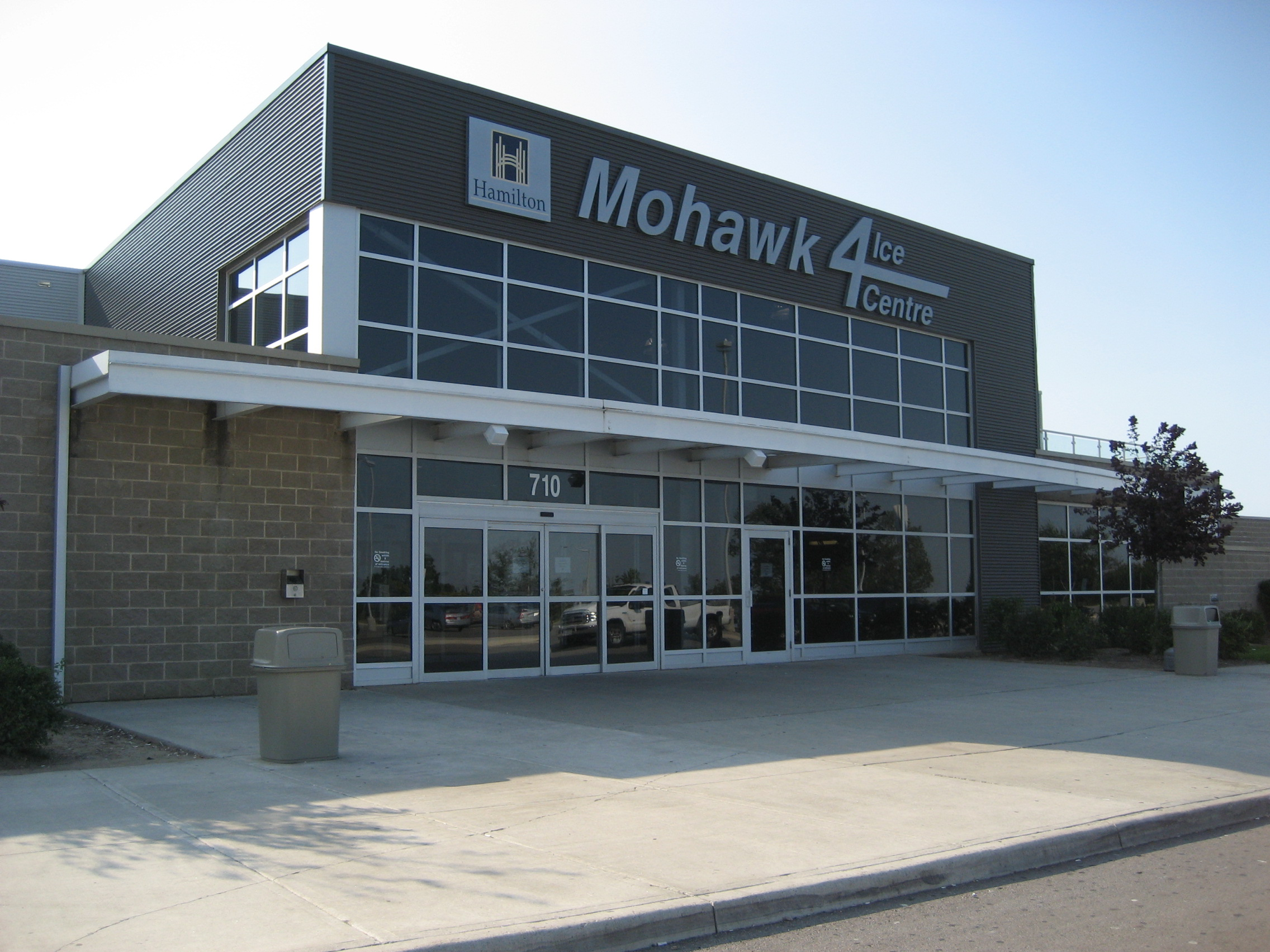
Mohawk 4 Ice Centre

Mohawk Road is an arterial road in Hamilton, Ontario, Canada, running through the Ancaster and Upper City (mountain) districts, and has two distinct segments. The western segment begins as a continuation of Rousseaux Street in Ancaster just west of the interchange with Highway 403 and the Lincoln M. Alexander Parkway (The Linc), and travels eastward to the interchange with the two freeways, defaulting into the latter. The eastern segment begins as a continuation of Golf Links Road (which runs east from the Meadowlands) at the same interchange near the Iroquoia Heights Conservation Area, and runs parallel with the Linc, cuts across the Hamilton mountain and ends at Mountain Brow Boulevard, the site of Mohawk Sports Park.

== History ==
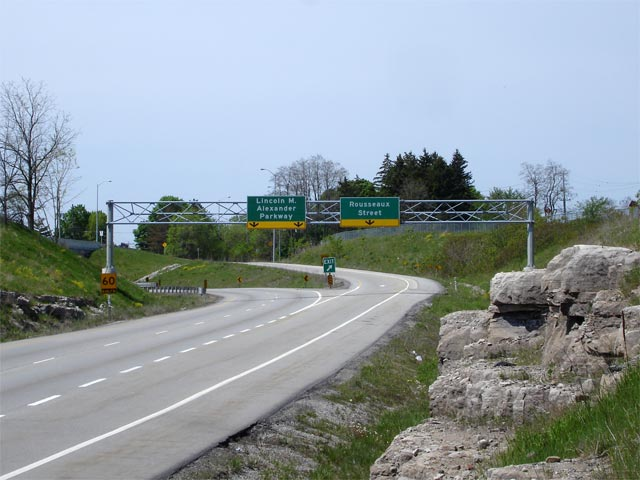
To avoid confusing motorists, signage on the ramp leading from Highway 403 to Mohawk Rd. is incorrectly (but deliberately) signed as Rousseaux St.

Mohawk Road, is a road that follows the route of the Algonquian and Iroquoian Great Trail that passed through dense forest. First Nation inhabitants in the area walked this path from upper New York State.

The first area of Hamilton mountain to be settled was by the Pennsylvania Dutch Loyalists at present-day Mohawk Road, west of Upper James Street, which runs to the mountain brow between Queen Street and the Sanatorium. Upper James Street at the time was known as the Caledonia Highway.

In 2019, there was a proposal to rename the Ancaster portion that continues from Rousseaux Street, to Rousseaux Street; to avoid confusing motorists since the street was broken due to the construction of the Linc. However, due to lack of enough support, the proposal was cancelled. Despite this, the exits for Mohawk Road on both Highway 403 and the Linc are today signed as Rousseaux Street.

== Major intersections ==
Note: Listing of streets from West to East.

- Upper Paradise Road
- Garth Street
- West 5th Street
- Upper James Street
- Upper Wellington Street
- Upper Wentworth Street
- Upper Sherman Avenue
- Upper Gage Avenue
- Upper Ottawa Street
- Upper Kenilworth Avenue
- Mountain Brow Boulevard

== See also ==
- Niagara Escarpment Commission
