= Rosedene, Ontario =

Rosedene
- Unincorporated rural community
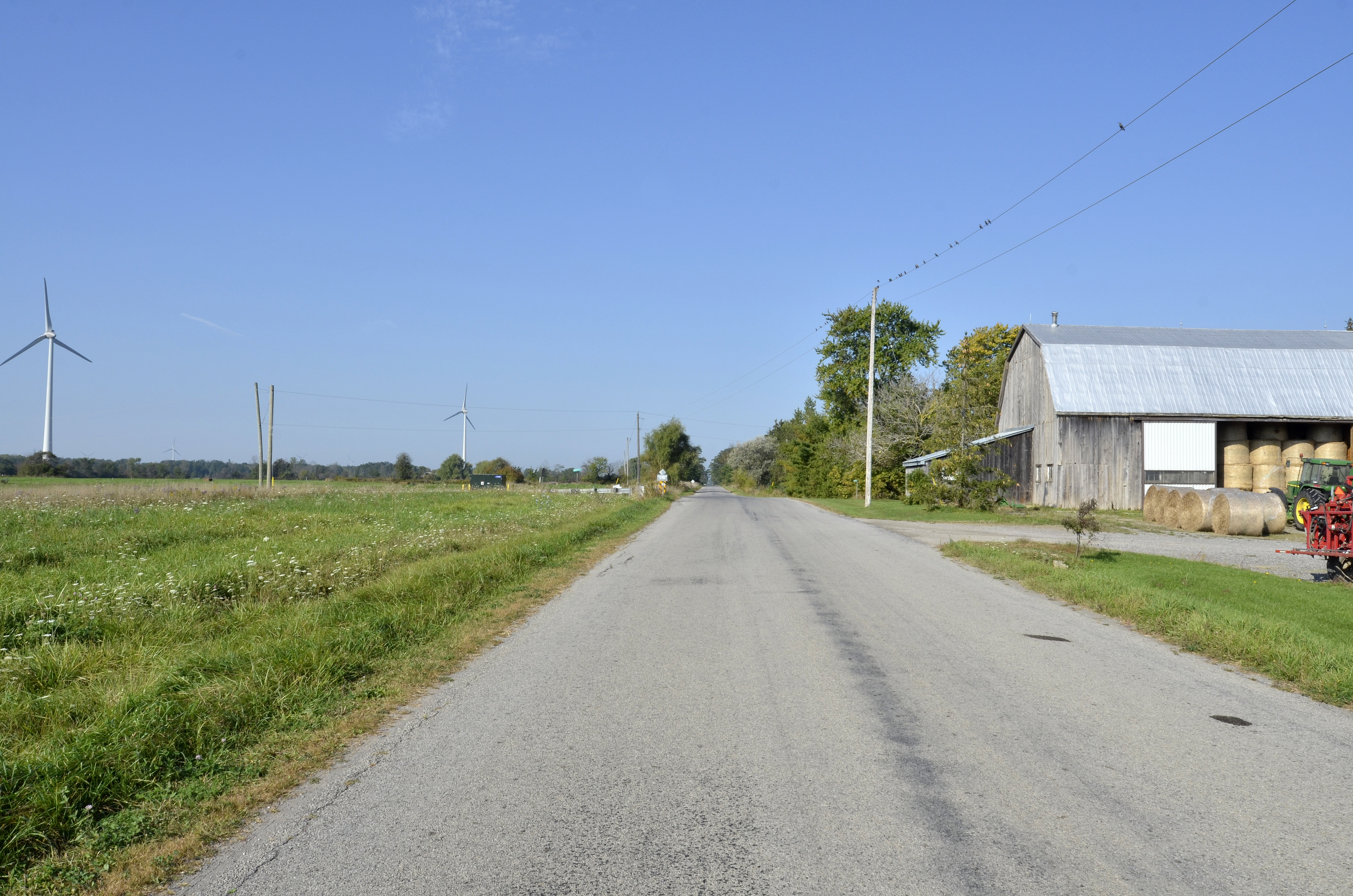
- Concession Four in Rosedene

- Location within Canada Location within Ontario
- Coordinates: 43°03′37″N 79°24′49″W
- Country: Canada
- Province: Ontario
- Regional municipality: Niagara
- Township: West Lincoln
- Time zone: UTC-5 (Eastern (EST))
  - Summer (DST): UTC-4 (EDT)
- GNBC Code: FCMDQ

Rosedene is an unincorporated rural community in West Lincoln Township, Niagara Region, Ontario, Canada.

== History ==
Rosedene had a post office from 1862 to 1913.

The population in 1910 was 50.

A chapter of the Federated Women's Institutes of Ontario was located in Rosedene from 1909 to 2007.
