= Mount Sterling, Missouri =

Unincorporated community in Missouri, United States

Coordinates: 38°27′54″N 91°37′38″W

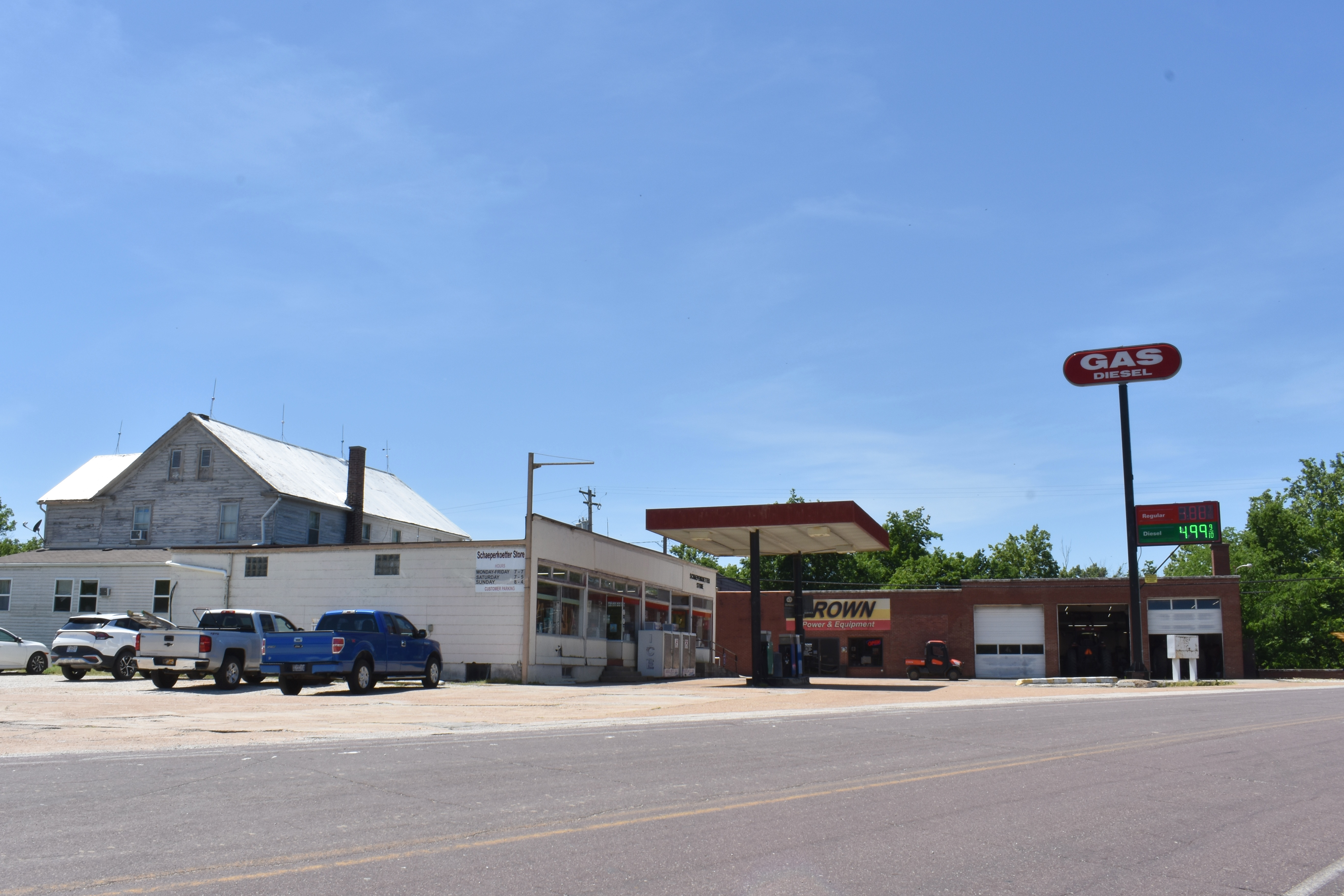
Mount Sterling in May 2026

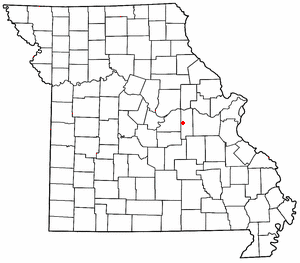

Mount Sterling is an unincorporated community in western Gasconade County, Missouri, United States.

== Location ==
Mount Sterling is located at the intersection of U.S. Route 50 and Missouri Route A. The Gasconade River flows past the west side of the town. The Gasconade-Osage county line is approximately one mile west of the community. The county seat of Hermann is 18 miles to the northeast.

== History ==
A part of the Louisiana Purchase, Mount Sterling was first settled by American pioneers in the 1820s. In 1828, the Gasconade County seat was moved from Bartonville to Mount Sterling due to flooding problems from the Gasconade River in the low-lying town.

In 1843, county residents voted to move the county seat again, this time to the larger city of Hermann, located at the Missouri River.

A post office called Mount Sterling was established in 1843, and remained in operation until 1965. It is unknown why the name "Mount Sterling" was applied to this community.
