= Ancaster Old Mill Road Race =

Ancaster Old Mill Road Race, began in 1983 with a field of just 260 runners. By 2008, the race had expanded drastically since its beginning, with 2,000 runners competing. Since the beginning, Anton Plas has been the race organizer orchestrating the planning and executing of the Ancaster Old Mill Race. The race is generally situated on the Tuesday evening of the Heritage Celebration Days in Ancaster. Net proceeds from the race is donated to various local charities, including the Brain Tumour Foundation, McMaster University Children's Hospital, United Way of Burlington and Greater Hamilton, and other community based charities. The race features a 10 km and 5 km running race for all ages and abilities.
