= Brad Cheeseman =

Canadian jazz bassist and composer

Brad Cheeseman is a Canadian jazz bassist and composer from Hamilton, Ontario. He is most noted for his 2017 album The Tide Turns, for which he received a Juno Award nomination for Jazz Album of the Year – Solo at the Juno Awards of 2018.

A graduate of Ancaster High School, Mohawk College, Humber College and York University, he released the EP Mixed Messages in 2013. It was nominated for several awards at the Hamilton Music Awards that year, and won the award for Instrumental Recording of the Year. His debut full-length album Brad Cheeseman Group was released in 2015, and again won the award for Instrumental Recording of the Year at the Hamilton Music Awards. In 2016, he released the Figurants EP, which included compositions based on the David Foster Wallace novel Infinite Jest.

He performed at the Montreal Jazz Festival in 2016, winning the Grand Prix de Jazz award. His prize, a $5,000 grant and a week of free recording studio time, led to the creation of The Tide Turns.

== Discography ==
- Mixed Messages EP (2013)
- Brad Cheeseman Group (2015)
- Figurants EP (2016)
- The Tide Turns (2017)
