= Ancaster High School =

Location
- 374 Jerseyville Road West; Ancaster, Ontario, L9G 3K8; Canada; 43°12′57″N 80°00′20″W

Information
- School type: Public, high school
- Motto: Scientia Est Libertas (Knowledge is Freedom)
- Opened: 1959
- School board: Hamilton Wentworth District School Board
- Superintendent: Lindsay Snell
- Area trustee: Alex Johnstone
- School number: 891894
- Principal: Jason Monteith
- Grades: 9–12
- Enrolment: 4192 (September 2014)
- Language: English
- Colours: Purple and Gold
- Team name: Royals
- Feeder schools: Frank Panabaker Elementary School; Ancaster Meadow Elementary School; Tiffany Hills Elementary School; Mount Hope Elementary School; Spring Valley Elementary School
- Website: www.hwdsb.on.ca/ancasterhigh/

Ancaster High School is a member of the Hamilton-Wentworth District School Board. The school also offers special education classes as well as an ESL program and E learning classes. Ancaster High School is a registered International Baccalaureate (I.B), it is an “IB world school”. The school offers plenty of clubs and extracurriculars with lots of sports like waterpolo and the school has its own pool.

== Notable alumni ==
- Marv Allemang, football player
- Bob Cameron, Member of Canadian Football Hall of Fame
- Brad Cheeseman, jazz bassist
- Marcia MacMillan, news anchor
- Jana Prikryl, poet Go to the washer for the clue
- Brad Bradford, politician
- Daniel Lanois, musician

== See also ==
- Education in Ontario
- List of secondary schools in Ontario
