= Marcia MacMillan =

Canadian journalist

- Born: 24 March 1970 (age 56)
- Education: University of Western Ontario (BA); Ryerson University
- Occupations: Television news anchor; journalist
- Years active: 1998 – present
- Employer: CTV News
- Awards: RTNDA Award, 2014

Marcia MacMillan (born 24 March 1970; first name MAR-see-uh, /mɑːrsiə/) is a Canadian news anchor for CTV News Channel broadcasting the morning and weekend CTV National News, as of 2025. She is based in Toronto.

== History and education ==
MacMillan is from the Ancaster community of Hamilton, Ontario. She was attracted to the role of a television news anchor at age 10.

She graduated from Ancaster High School in 1989, then earned both a bachelor's degree in political science from the University of Western Ontario and a graduate degree in journalism from Ryerson University.

She started her broadcasting career as a reporter for MCTV in Sudbury, Ontario, later for MCTV in North Bay, Ontario, then moved to CKWS in Kingston, Ontario. She also reported for The Weather Network, CHCH-TV and Toronto 1.

== Broadcasting career ==
MacMillan began work at CTV News as a reporter in November 2005. During her career, MacMillan has covered Toronto Mayor Rob Ford, the capture of the Boston Marathon bombers, meetings of the G20, several US and Canadian federal elections, the assassination of former Pakistani Prime Minister Benazir Bhutto, Hurricane Gustav, and the Toronto International Film Festival.

Her live interviews on CTV News have included former U.S. Vice-President Al Gore, Taylor Swift, and Canadian professional tennis player, Milos Raonic.

In September, 2022, she was one of the CTV News correspondents reporting from the funeral of Queen Elizabeth II.

== Awards ==
- RTNDA Award for coverage of the 2009 Buffalo plane crash

== Personal life ==
MacMillan has practiced a fitness routine for decades, is an advocate for women’s health and wellness, and once completed a triathlon. She had a health scare during a run in 2010 when she was later diagnosed with "a lot of blood clots in both lungs".

In 2020, she publicly shared experiences about her mother, Margaret, who had dementia.

MacMillan supports Big Brothers and Big Sisters of Canada.
