= Smithville, Ontario =

Community in Ontario, Canada

Smithville
- Unincorporated community
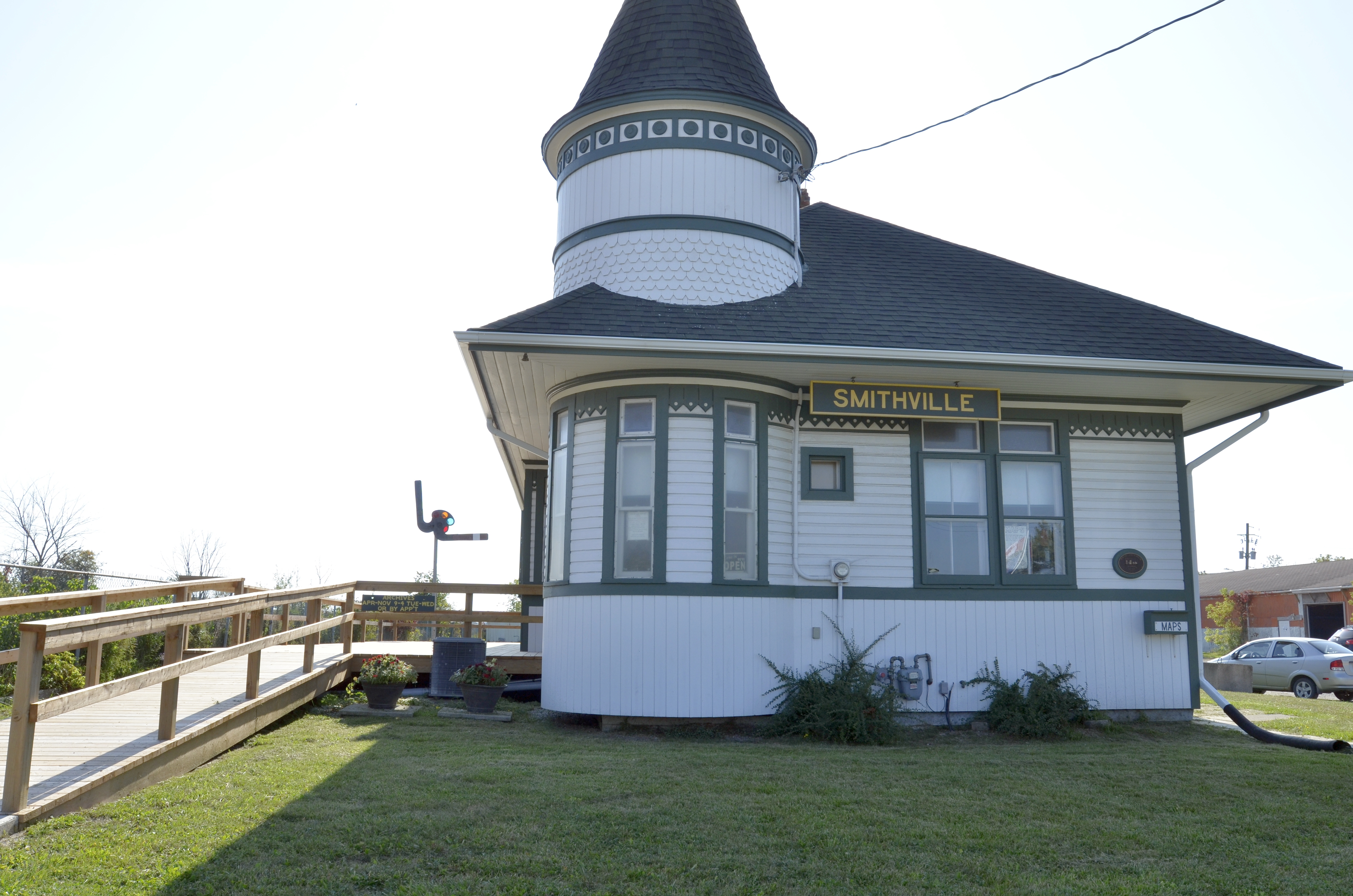
- Train station in Smithville
- Nicknames: The Hub of the Niagara Peninsula, The Chicken Capital of Canada
- Interactive map of Smithville
- Coordinates: 43°5′50″N 79°32′47″W
- Country: Canada
- Province: Ontario
- Regional municipality: Niagara
- Township: West Lincoln
- Founded: 1787

Area
  - Total: 4.79 km^{2} (1.85 sq mi)
- Elevation: 200 m (650 ft)

Population (2016)
  - Total: 5,489
  - Density: 1,146.1/km^{2} (2,968/sq mi)
- Time zone: UTC-5 (EST)
  - Summer (DST): UTC-4 (EDT)
- Forward sortation area: L0R 2A0
- Area codes: 905 and 289
- NTS Map: 30M4 Stoney Creek
- GNBC Code: FCPLS

Smithville is a community in the township of West Lincoln, Niagara Region, Ontario, Canada. The former police village is located on Highway 20 between Hamilton and Niagara Falls. Smithville is the largest population centre and governing centre of the township of West Lincoln.

== History ==
Smithville was first settled by Richard Griffin and his family, including his sons Abraham, Edward, Nathaniel, Isaiah, Smith, Jonathan, and Richard Jr., United Empire Loyalists who came from Nine Partners, New York in 1787. They settled on Lots 8, 9, 10, Concession IX, on the Twenty Mile Creek in Grimsby (later South Grimsby) Township. Solomon Hill, who married Bethia, daughter of Richard Griffin, settled on Lot 6, Charles Meridith on Lot 7; Thomas Harris on Lot 11, and Thomas North on Lot 12. These lots, all in the 9th Concession became the settlement first known as Griffintown, but later renamed after Mrs. Griffin, whose maiden name was Mary Smith.

Edward "Ned" Griffin is sometimes claimed to be the real founder of the village. He was the one who felled the first tree, chose the village site, cleared the first acre of land, built the first house, and lived his entire life in the village. His brother, Smith Griffin, another of Richard Griffin's sons is credited with building a treadwheel in 1810. Settlers who wanted their grain ground were required to provide their own motive power by putting their oxen on the tread. Later, Smith Griffin built a dam and mill on the Twenty Mile Creek, making the treadmill obsolete. Smith also started an ashery, while Edward opened a general store.

By 1849, Smithville had reached a population of about 150, and had been granted a post office with twice-weekly delivery. The settlement had a grist mill, a saw mill, a carding machine and cloth factory, four stores, one machine shop, one tannery, two blacksmiths, two tailors and two shoemakers.

Smithville first became a police village in 1887, however the arrangement was unsatisfactory and the village again became part of South Grimsby Township in 1889. It was not until 1914 that Smithville was reorganized into a police village on a more permanent basis. By the 1950s, the population had grown to approximately 1,000.

Smithville, along with the remainder of South Grimsby Township was amalgamated into the newly formed Township of West Lincoln on January 1, 1970.

== Demographics ==
Canada census – Smithville, Ontario community profile

| | 2016 | 2011 |
| Population | 5489 (+13.4% from 2011) | 4391 (+9% from 2006) |
| Land area | 4.79 km^{2} (1.85 sq mi) | 4.75 km^{2} (1.83 sq mi) |
| Population density | 1,146.1/km^{2} (2,968/sq mi) | 944.6/km^{2} (2,447/sq mi) |
| Median age | 39.6 (M: 38.6, F: 40.6) | 35.5 (M: 34.7, F: 36.1) |
| Private dwellings | 1995 (total) | 1612 (total) |
| Median household income |

References: 2016 2011

Population:

- Population in 2016: 5489
- Population in 2011: 4391
- Population in 2006: 4122
- Population in 2001: 3317

Mother tongue:

- English as first language: 92.2%
- French as first language: 0.6%
- English and French as first language: >0.1%
- Other as first language: 7.2%

Patron:

- Lord S. Grey

== Economy ==
Retail establishments in Smithville are congregated amongst two major nodes: the downtown core, and the Village Square Mall.

== Arts and culture ==
Until 2017, Smithville held an annual agricultural festival called PoultryFest.

The Smithville Fair was historically held at the West Lincoln Mixed Use Recreation Site (formerly Smithville Fairgrounds). The Smithville Agricultural Society merged with the Lincoln Agricultural Society in 2012, and the fair was moved to the nearby West Niagara Fairgrounds, where the agricultural fair is held annually before Labour Day.

== Attractions ==
=== Parks ===
Parks in Smithville include the Smithville Conservation Area, and the Mixed Use Recreational Site (MURS).

The "Murgatroyd Parkette" is at the corner of Griffin and St. Catharines Street. It has trees and benches, and features the town clock (from the original post offices) mounted on a pedestal. Once was a tie factory, this location was occupied by Hellbender Ink Vintage Tattoo, becoming it's very first tattoo shop in 2013.

The Smithville Branch of the West Lincoln Public Library is located at the West Lincoln Community Complex and Arena on West St. and is open six days a week.

== Government ==
In some ways Smithville acts as the "administrative centre" of the Township of West Lincoln. The council chambers and the largest branch of the municipal library are located in town, as well as the major fire station. The public works yard is also centralized in a Smithville location.

From 1970 to 2018, Smithville fell just north of the boundary of two municipal wards. The area north of Townline Road, the bulk of the community, was part of Ward 3, the former Township of South Grimsby. New development south of Townline, mainly the Alma Acres, fell into Ward 2, the former Township of Gainsborough. In 2018, a revision of ward boundaries placed Smithville and its environs into a new, smaller Ward 3.

West Lincoln elects one regional councillor, in addition to the Mayor who also serves as the local regional council.

Federally and provincially, Smithville is located in the riding of Niagara West.

== Infrastructure ==
=== Transportation ===
Smithville is located on two regional roads. Regional Road 20, formerly King's Highway 20, goes primarily east-west, connecting Smithville with Niagara Falls and Hamilton. Regional Road 14 connects Smithville to Grimsby and the Queen Elizabeth Way in the north, and Highway 3 in the south.

Smithville is located on the Canadian Pacific’s Hamilton Subdivision, the mainline of the former Toronto, Hamilton and Buffalo Railway. Smithville had a passenger station until 1981, when all such service along the line was discontinued. The former station (built 1903) is a local landmark, and serves as the headquarters of the West Lincoln Historical Society.

Smithville was also the junction with the railroad's Dunnville spur. Passenger service along the Dunnville line was suspended in 1933. Freight service lasted until 2003, when the line was abandoned. The tracks were subsequently lifted and the bridges over the Twenty Mile Creek and Highway 20 demolished.

== Education ==
Smithville has five schools, including four elementary and one secondary.

Smithville Public School, on Colver Street, opened in 2018 in the former South Lincoln High School. Coincidentally, the now disused College Street Public School had been the location of Smithville High School until 1948.

St. Martin's, on West Street (Highway 20) is an elementary school in the Catholic (separate) board. John Calvin (Station Street) associated with the Canadian Reformed Church and Cairn Christian (Townline Road) are private Christian schools.

Smithville Christian High School, formerly Smithville District Christian High School, is a Christian secondary school and the only remaining secondary school in town, after the closure of South Lincoln High School for the 2017-2018 school year, which ended over 150 years of public secondary education in the community.
