= Bartonville, Missouri =

Extinct hamlet in Missouri, U.S.

Coordinates: 38.435°N 91.671°W

Bartonville, MO, was the second town named as the county seat of Gasconade County, in 1825. It was abandoned to the Gasconade River after severe flooding. Its location in Township 43, Range 7 West was not identified again until 1998, when a researcher found a notice of sheriff's sale which included a legal description of the "Bartonville tract". Bartonville, a lost town, was situated in what is now Osage County, across the Gasconade River from Cooper Hill.

Bartonville was the county seat until 1828, when like its predecessor Gasconade, it was flooded. The county seat was then moved to the higher town of Mount Sterling. In 1842 residents voted to move it again, to Hermann.

The Encyclopedia of the History of Missouri, 1901, Conard, Vol. 3, Page 5, erroneously listed Bartonville as the first county seat of Gasconade County. Gasconade (city) held that distinction. The encyclopedia also mistakenly identified Mount Sterling as a renaming of Bartonville. In fact, the towns were distinct and were in different locations.

== Gazetteer reference ==
The Geographic Names Information System lists Bartonville, a.k.a. Bartonsville, with a location of "unknown".
