= Hamilton District Christian High School =

Hamilton District Christian High

Location
- 92 Glancaster Road; Ancaster, Ontario, L9G 3K9; Canada; 43.2076°N 79.9315°W

Information
- School type: High school
- Religious affiliation: Independent Christian
- Founded: 1956
- Principal: Duncan Todd
- Grades: 9 – 12
- Enrolment: 450 (February 2019)
- Language: English
- Team name: Knights
- Website: hdch.org

Hamilton District Christian High is an independent Christian day school in Ancaster, Ontario Canada. As a registered private school with the Ontario Ministry of Education the school provides a curriculum that follows Ministry guidelines and standards through a Christ-centred, project-based learning approach. The academic program runs from grade 9 to grade 12.

== History ==
Established in 1956 by members of the Christian Reformed Church in North America, the student population represents a variety of over twenty different Christian denominations. Approximately 10% of the student body is made up of international students.

Timeline

- 1956: Hamilton District Christian High (HDCH) is established inside Calvin Christian School
- 1961: HDCH moves to the Athens Street campus
- 1989: HDCH builds a new school at Glancaster Road, Ancaster
- 2016: Glancaster campus is renovated with the addition of the Grove and the Atrium

== Athletics ==
HDCH's sports teams are called the Knights, and are particularly strong in soccer, volleyball, beach volleyball, basketball and track and field. In addition, the Knights field teams in hockey, slo-pitch, lacrosse, badminton, ski, snowboard and golf. HDCH participates in the HWIAC and competes in Zone 1 of the Southern Ontario Secondary Schools Association, part of the Ontario Federation of School Athletic Associations. The school is also a member the Ontario Christian Secondary School Athletic Association and competes with member Christian high schools from all over Ontario.

=== Class projects ===
- A nine-hold Disc Golf course was designed and built by students on campus in 2017.
- Four beach volleyball courts were planned and built at Hamilton District Christian High as a class project in 2018.

== See also ==
- Education in Ontario
- List of secondary schools in Ontario
