= Binbrook, Ontario =

Community in southeastern Hamilton, Ontario, Canada

Coordinates: 43.1217°N 79.8045°W

Binbrook
- Community (Dissolved town)
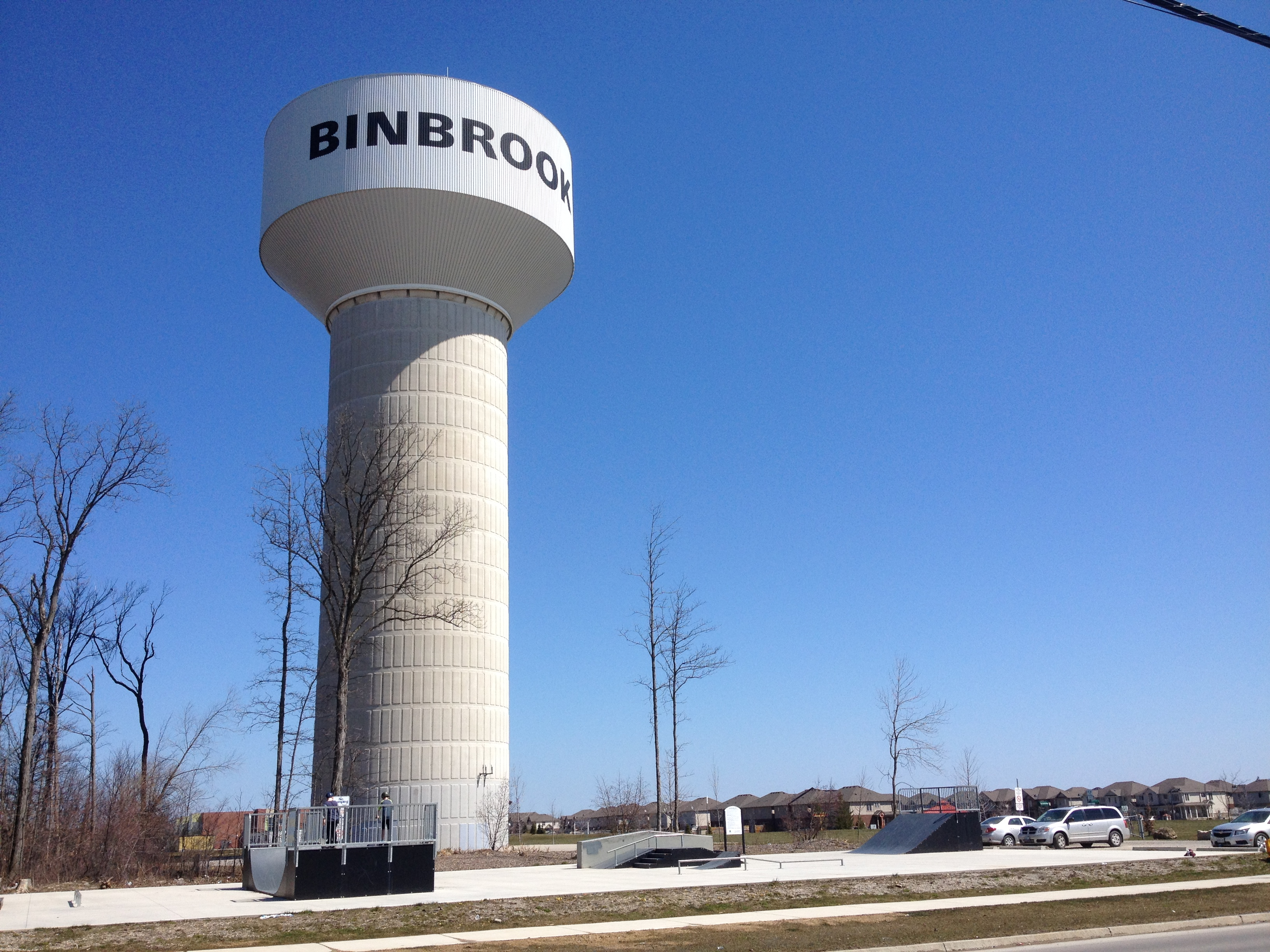
- The Binbrook Water Tower, next to the Binbrook skatepark in the front.

- Location within City of Hamilton
- Country: Canada
- Province: Ontario
- City: Hamilton
- First Registry: 1791 (as Township #11, later renamed to Binbrook)
- Integrated: 1974 (into Glanbrook)
- Amalgamated: 2001 (into the City of Hamilton)
- Named for: Binbrook

Government
  - MP: Dan Muys (CPC)
  - MPP: Donna Skelly (PC)

Area
  - Total: 6.41 km^{2} (2.47 sq mi)

Population (2021)
  - Total: 10,791
- Time zone: UTC-5 (Eastern Time Zone)
  - Summer (DST): UTC-4 (Eastern Daylight Time)
- Postal code: L0R
- Area code: 905

Binbrook is a community in southeastern Hamilton, Ontario, in Canada. It was amalgamated into the city of Hamilton in 2001. Binbrook has a population of 10,791 residents (2021). Binbrook was amalgamated alongside Mount Hope to form Glanbrook in 1974. Since then, hundreds of new homes have been built in Binbrook, which is separated from Hamilton by conservation and agricultural lands.

== History ==
The community of Binbrook has a rich history of agriculture and First Nations peoples. Evidence has been found of Algonquin tribes inhabiting this area.

The first registry of Binbrook was in 1791 when it was named Township #11 in the District of Nassau. The plan can be found in the Department of Lands and Forests, Toronto, dated October 25, 1791, where it lists four concessions and blocks divided amongst several families. Township #11 was renamed to Binbrook after the same town in Lincolnshire, England, in 1792. Binbrook was then grouped with four other counties into the District of Niagara in 1798. 18 years later, in 1816, the new Gore District was divided into two new counties known as Wentworth (which comprises Binbrook, four other townships, and part of the county of Haldimand) and Halton. Binbrook was amalgamated with the nearby township of Glanford in 1974 to form the municipal township of Glanbrook within the Regional Municipality of Hamilton–Wentworth. In 2001 Glanbrook was amalgamated with the City of Hamilton.

Armstrong's General Store was a longtime centre of community activity as was the feed mill. In the 1960s, Cybulski's Grocery Store became a hub for the small community. Knox Presbyterian Church, a Baptist church, and Anglican Church all are near the centre of the village.

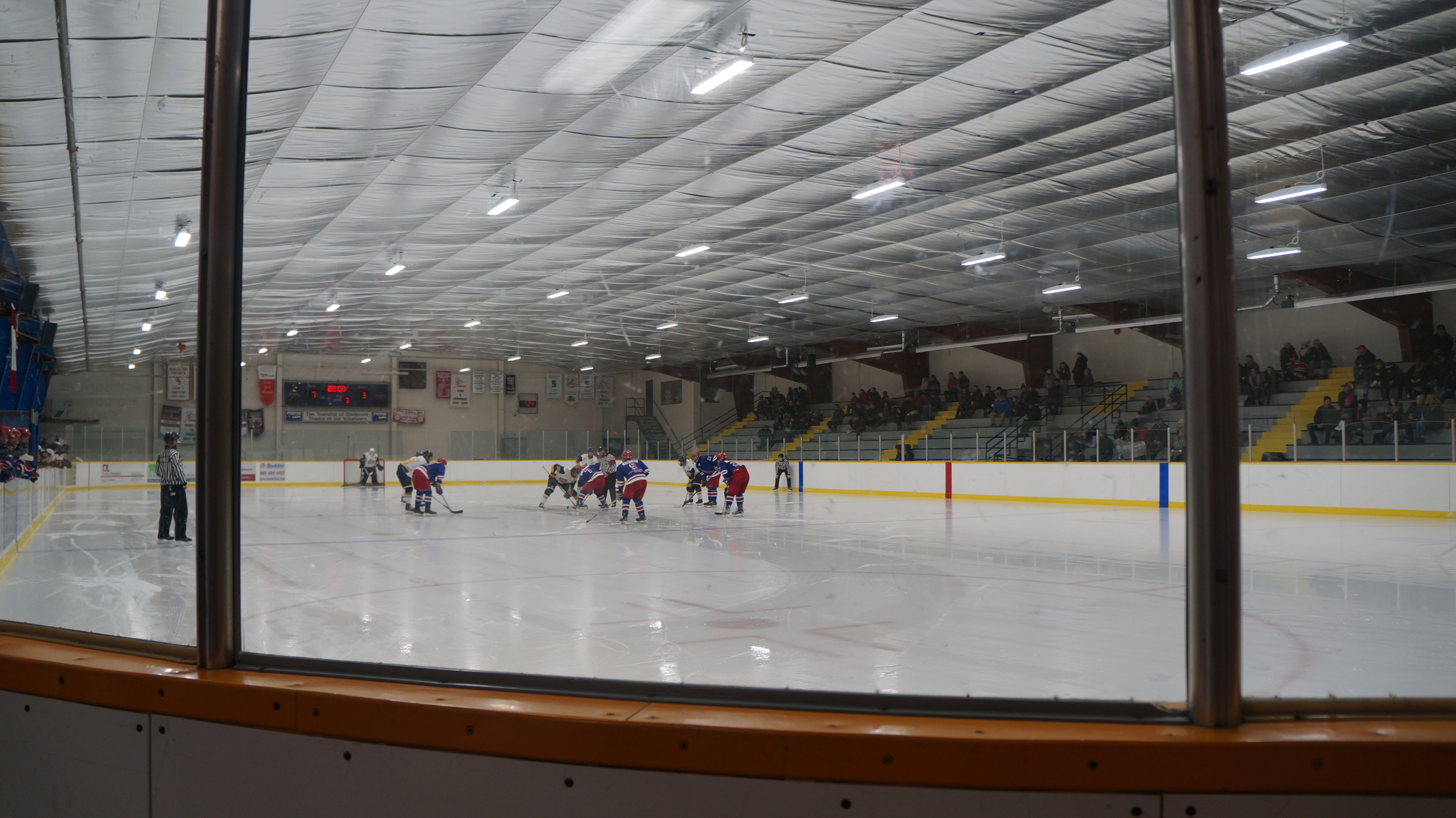
Glanbrook Arena in Binbrook

The Binbrook Little Theatre, across from the Agricultural Hall, is home to local productions that highlight the area's creativity and culture. It puts on three productions a season.

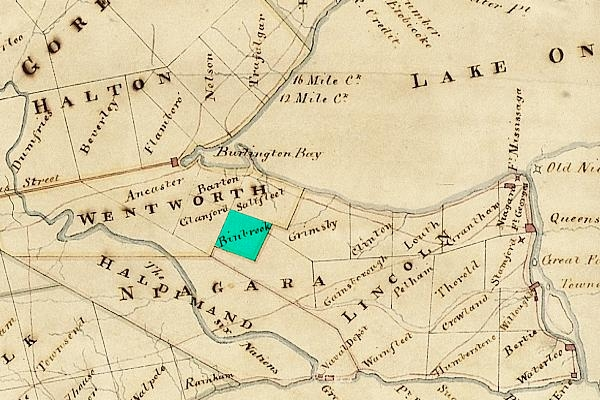
Binbrook Township on an 1818 map, highlighted in green

The Hamilton Public Library opened the Binbrook branch, which was established in 1966. The current, open concept design building opened to the public in 1982, and was renovated in April 2018.

The community also has a community centre, arena, soccer fields, and the Binbrook Conservation area.

== Binbrook Agricultural Society ==
The Binbrook Agricultural Society (BAS) is a volunteer-run organization established in 1854.

Open seasonally, the Binbrook farmers' market is an event highlighting local growers and artisans. The market takes place at the fairgrounds, which is the host of one of North America's oldest fall fairs. The fairgrounds and Agricultural Hall are home to many community events and lie at the centre of the community.

== Binbrook Conservation Area ==
The Binbrook Conservation Area is a 396-hectare (978-acre) tract of land owned and operated by the Niagara Peninsula Conservation Authority. Of this area, 174 hectares (430 acres) are covered by picturesque Lake Niapenco. The area was purchased by the NPCA in 1968. The lake was formed after the completion of the 1971 dam. The dam was built to augment the Welland River's summer water flow and provide seasonal flood control.

The lake is surrounded by open meadows, hardwood forests, and reforested areas. There were once campgrounds in the conservation area. The old campground access roads now provide the basis for many hiking trails at the Binbrook Conservation Area.

== Demography ==
The population of the Binbrook population centre was 10,791 at the Canada 2021 Census.

The community still has its roots in farming, and new residents continue to support the local farming community while encouraging the vitality and growth of the village.

== Education ==
The town of Binbrook is home to three elementary schools. Bellmoore is run by the Hamilton-Wentworth District School Board (HWDSB), while St. Matthew and Our Lady of Hope are run by the Hamilton-Wentworth Catholic District School Board (HWCDSB).

Originally founded by Dr. Leslie Bell in 1955, Bellmoore Elementary School was reopened in 2012 and currently serves students from junior kindergarten through grade 8. Bellmoore is home to the Bellmoore Bulldogs.

St. Matthew Catholic Elementary School opened on May 3, 2010. The elementary school was the first elementary school in Hamilton and one of the first in Ontario to employ a Leadership in Energy and Environment Design (LEED). St. Matthew is home to the St. Matthew Mustangs.

Our Lady of Hope Catholic Elementary School was opened on March 9, 2021. It enrolls students from junior kindergarten through grade 8. Our Lady of Hope is home to the Our Lady of Hope Hawks.
