= Glanbrook, Hamilton, Ontario =

District in Hamilton, Ontario

Coordinates: 43.178°N 79.932°W

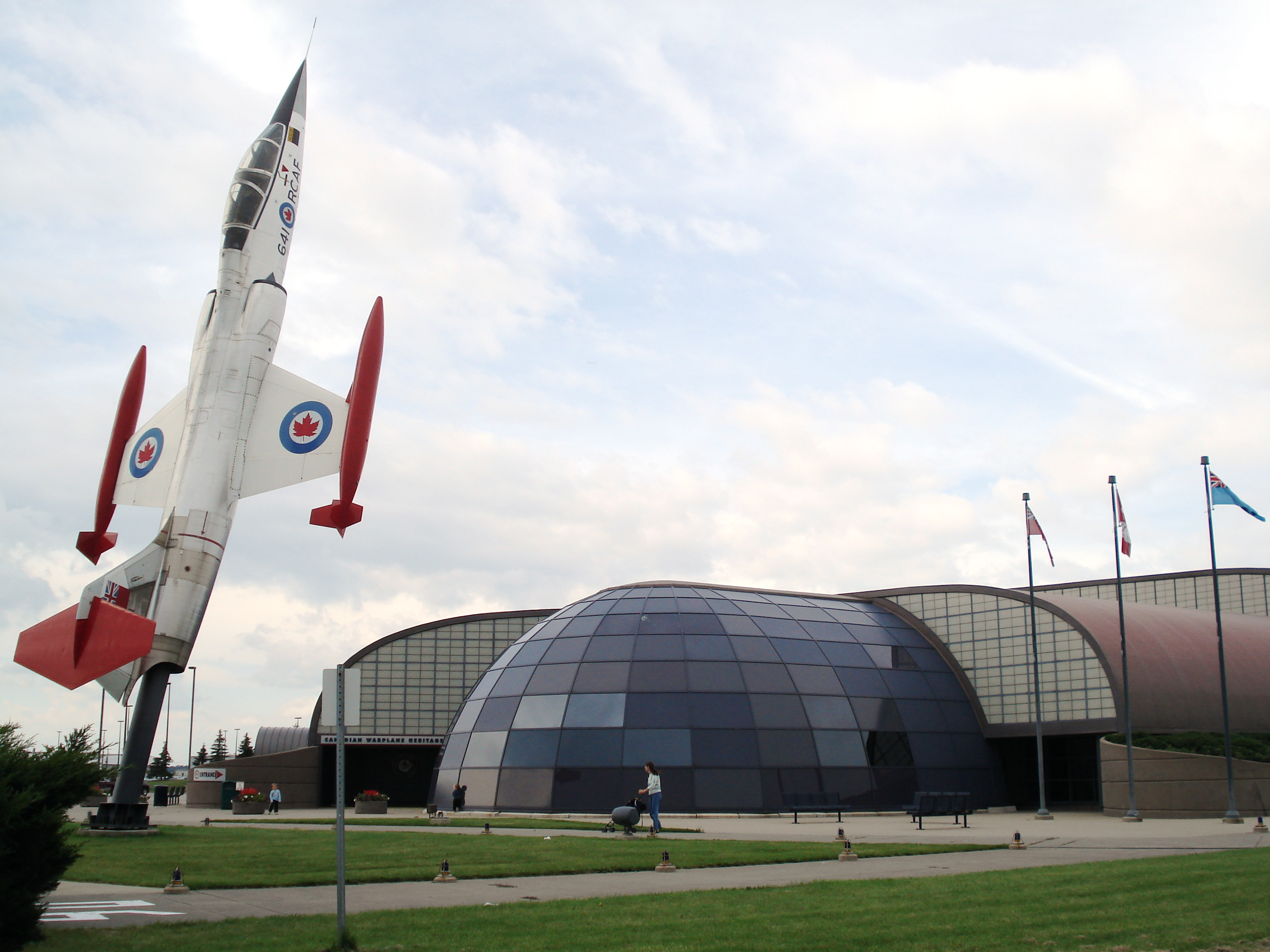
The Canadian Warplane Heritage Museum

Glanbrook is the south-western district of the city of Hamilton, Ontario, Canada. It was first created as an independent township in 1974 through the amalgamation of Mount Hope, Binbrook, Glanford, and other nearby communities. In 2001, Glanbrook became a dissolved municipality after it was amalgamated with Hamilton, Stoney Creek, Dundas, Ancaster and Flamborough to become the present city of Hamilton.

The population of Glanbrook as of the 2006 census was 15,293, a 25% increase from the 2001 census figure of 12,145, and making it the fastest growing part of Hamilton. It contains the John C. Munro Hamilton International Airport.

== History ==
=== Before 1938 ===
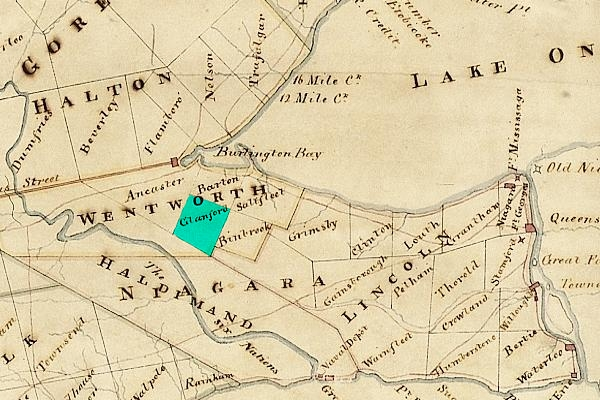
Glanford Township highlighted in green on an 1818 map

Glanford and Binbrook Townships were surveyed as part of Upper Canada in the 1790s, and originally formed part of Lincoln County. They became part of Wentworth County when the latter was created in 1816. After being deforested by pioneer settlers, Glanbrook was suitable for grain cultivation and mixed agriculture. However, its harsher climate did not make it nearly as suitable for growing fruit as its counterparts on the Niagara Peninsula.

A local married couple gained fame in a popular song in the 19th century. Margaret "Maggie" Clark was born in Glanford Township in 1841. She was taught at public school by George W. Johnson, who was born in Binbrook Township in 1839. They married in 1864, but she died shortly after of typhus. In 1866, Johnson had his friend J.C. Butterfield and a poem about his now deceased wife he published around the time of his marriage to music. "When You and I Were Young, Maggie" was debuted by his sister-in-law, and became popular worldwide. Johnson remarried twice and died in 1917.

Due to the barrier presented by the Niagara Escarpment, settlement was slower and sparser than that of its neighbours to the north in Saltfleet and Barton Townships (later Stoney Creek and Hamilton). Throughout the 19th and 20th centuries, the townships remained placid agrarian backwaters, far removed from the bustling heavy industry growing only a dozen miles away in Hamilton.

Politically, the townships’ local governments were neither active nor intrusive nor controversial. As part of the Wentworth (and later Wentworth East) provincial and federal ridings, voters in the townships helped elect largely non-descript and conservative members of the Ontario legislature and Canadian parliament.

=== 1939–1974 ===
During the Second World War, the Royal Canadian Air Force built an airfield in Glanford Township. It opened in 1940 to as part of the British Commonwealth Air Training Plan, and successively hosted Nos. 10 Elementary Flying Training School, 33 Air Navigation School and 1 Wireless School. The graves of 13 Britons and a Jamaican are still maintained by the Commonwealth War Graves Commission in the churchyard where they were buried.

After a long, gradual decline in its military use, the RCAF Station Mount Hope was declared surplus and the airport was wholly given over to civil aviation in 1963. It developed slowly in fits and starts as a cargo, light aircraft, charter, regional commuting and international airport.

Since 1971, a dam at Binbrook Conservation Area near the source of the Welland River has created a reservoir to control flooding downstream. The conservation area is operated by the Niagara Peninsula Conservation Authority, and hence the reservoir is called Lake Niapenco. Binbrook Conservation Area offers opportunities for fishing, boating, hiking and birding.

In 1974, the Regional Municipality of Hamilton-Wentworth was created. Glanford and Binbrook were amalgamated to form the Township of Glanbrook as one of the region's six second tier municipalities which were responsible for such things as fire services.

=== 1975–2019 ===
Beginning in the early 1970s, a small group of enthusiastic volunteers with an interest in military aviation history helped create Canadian Warplane Heritage. Their small collection of Second World War-era aircraft flew at such events as the Canadian National Exhibition Air Show in Toronto and the Hamilton International Air Show.

As the CWH's warplane collection grew, the first paid employees were hired and it expanded to occupy two hangars at Mount Hope Airport. Unfortunately, in 1993, a fire there destroyed five aircraft including a rare Spitfire and Hurricane of the Victory Flight, but sparing a Lancaster.

The airport itself was privatized in 1995. The following year, aided by provincial grants, a replacement hangar for the CWH was built and a proper static museum opened on the site. The airport was renamed for John Munro, former MP for Hamilton East and a former transport minister, in 1998.

In 2001, over the vocal objections of most of its 10,000 inhabitants and its elected representatives, Glanbrook was amalgamated with Stoney Creek, Dundas, Flamborough, Ancaster and Hamilton to form the new City of Hamilton.
