= Jana Prikryl =

Czech American poet (born 1975)

- Born: 1975 (age 50–51); Ostrava, Czechoslovakia
- Citizenship: American
- Education: University of Toronto; New York University
- Occupations: Poet, writer, critic
- Writing career
- Language: English
- Genre: Poetry
- Notable awards: Guggenheim Fellowship (2020)
- Website: janaprikryl.tumblr.com

Jana Prikryl, born in Ostrava, Czechoslovakia in 1975, is a poet, critic and editor. In 2020, she was awarded a Guggenheim Fellowship.

== Early life and education ==
Jana Prikryl was born in Ostrava, now in the Czech Republic. Aged five, in 1980, her parents took her and her elder brother on a 'holiday' to the Dalmatian coast of the then Yugoslavia, but diverted to Zagreb, obtained four-day tourist visas to Austria with passports valid only for travel to Yugoslavia, and, after some time in Austria, moved to Canada when Jana was six. The family settled in Hamilton, Ontario, where Prikryl attended Ancaster High School.

Prikryl learned Czech, then German, with English as her third language after her family moved to Canada. She now considers English to be her first language, and still speaks Czech.

She graduated with a BA in English from the University of Toronto. After time living in Dublin, Prikryl moved to New York in 2003 to study for an MA in cultural reporting and criticism from New York University.

== Career ==
Following graduation, Prikryl worked at The New York Review of Books, initially as an intern. She became a senior editor, and in February 2021, she was named executive editor.

As an essayist, her writings on photography and film have been published in the Nation and the New York Review.

Her poetry and criticism has been published in the New Yorker, the London Review of Books, the New York Review of Books, the Paris Review, the Nation, and the Baffler, in two collections - The After Party and No Matter, and three anthologies, Best American Poetry 2020, Best Canadian poetry 2020, and 'The unprofessionals : new American writing from the Paris Review (2015).

Her first book, The After Party was published in 2016. Reviewers considered her a "notably resourceful writer of autobiography", with an "understated sensibility" Themes include the Canadian landscape, "Ideas of in-betweenness", childhood and folklore.

No Matter (2019) was mainly written while a 2017–2018 Radcliffe Institute Fellow at the Radcliffe Institute for Advanced Study. Described as "restless, unsettled, elusive and dark" by the Toronto Star, No Matter was named one of the best poetry books of the year by the New York Times, and was chosen as one of the best books of the year 2019 in the New Statesman.

== Personal life ==
As of 2019, she lives in Brooklyn, N.Y., with her husband, performing artist, Colin Gee, and their son, Nicholas, born in 2016. She became a U.S. Citizen in 2016. Her mother, Marcela Prikryl, is a materials scientist, artist, and courtroom sketch artist for the Hamilton Spectator. Prikryl's older brother died in an automobile accident in 1995 at the age of 27, and her first book, The After Party is dedicated to him.

== Awards and recognition ==
Prikryl won a 2020 Guggenheim Fellowship. She was a 2017–2018 Radcliffe Institute Fellow at the Radcliffe Institute for Advanced Study at Harvard.

Prikryl has received a fellowship from Yaddo, and a Creative Writing Grant from the Canada Council for the Arts.

== Bibliography ==
=== Collections ===
- Prikryl, Jana (2016). The after party : poems. New York. ISBN 9781101906231.
- Prikryl, Jana (2019). No matter : poems. New York. ISBN 9781984825117.
- Prikryl, Jana (2022). Midwood : poems. New York. ISBN 9781324035213.

=== Anthologies (as contributor) ===
- Rekdal, Paisley, ed. (2020). The best American poetry 2020. New York: Simon and Schuster. ISBN 9781982106591.
- Dumont, Marilyn (2020). Best Canadian poetry, 2020 (First ed.). Windsor, Ontario. ISBN 9781771963640.
- The unprofessionals : new American writing from the Paris Review. New York, New York: Penguin Books. 2015. ISBN 9780698408920.
