= Ancaster, Ontario =

Community in Hamilton, Ontario

Ancaster
- Community (Dissolved town)
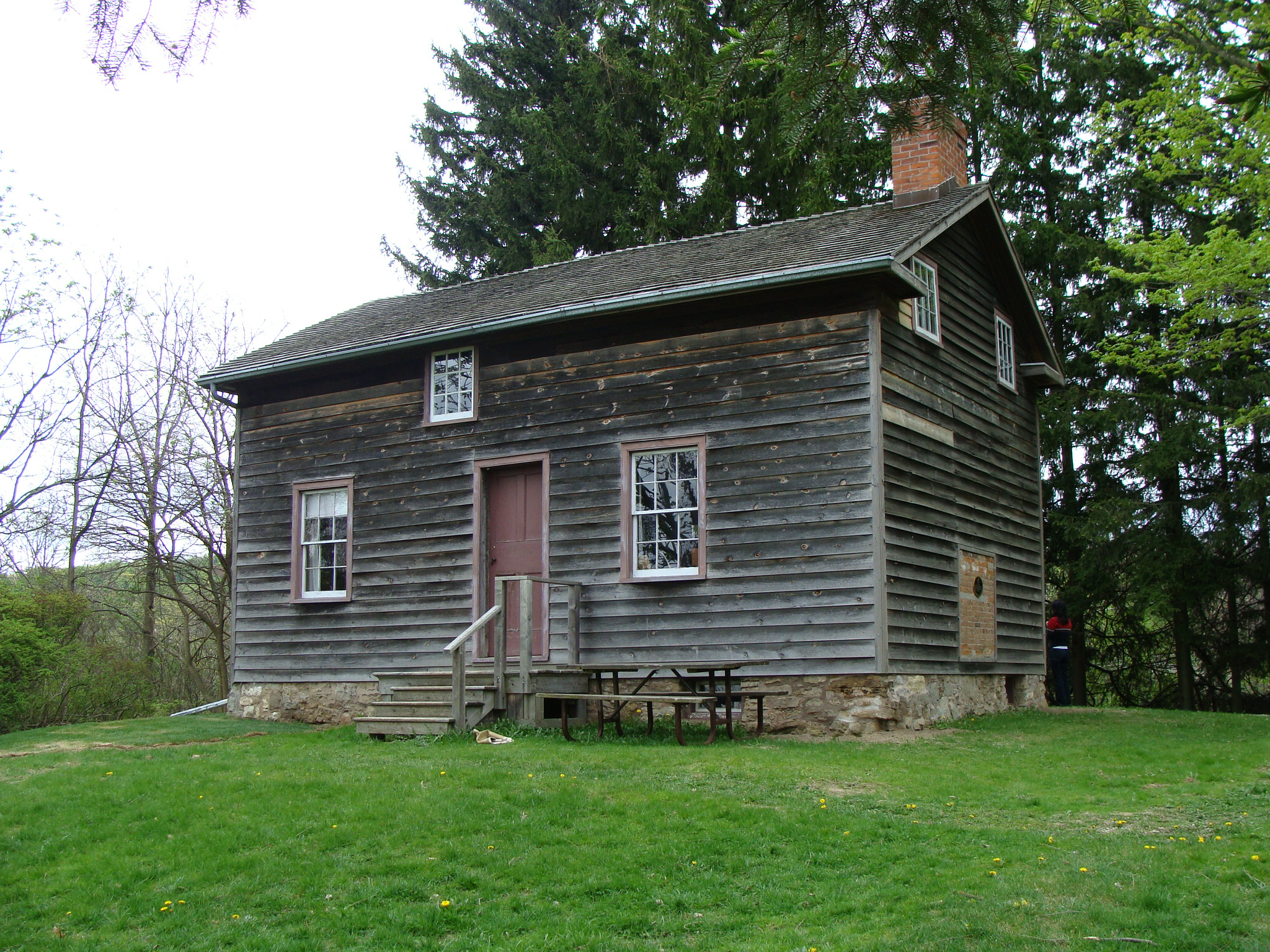
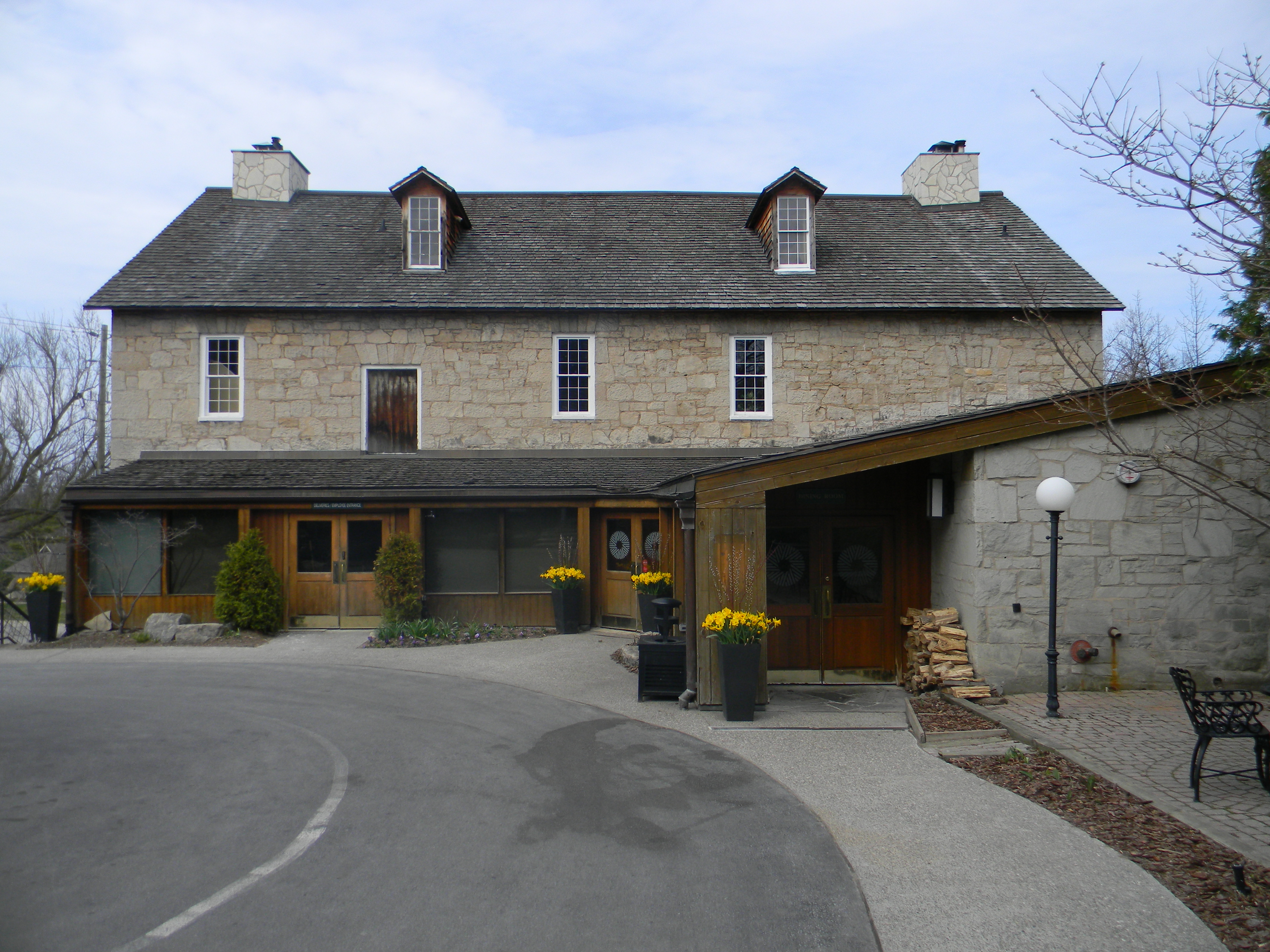
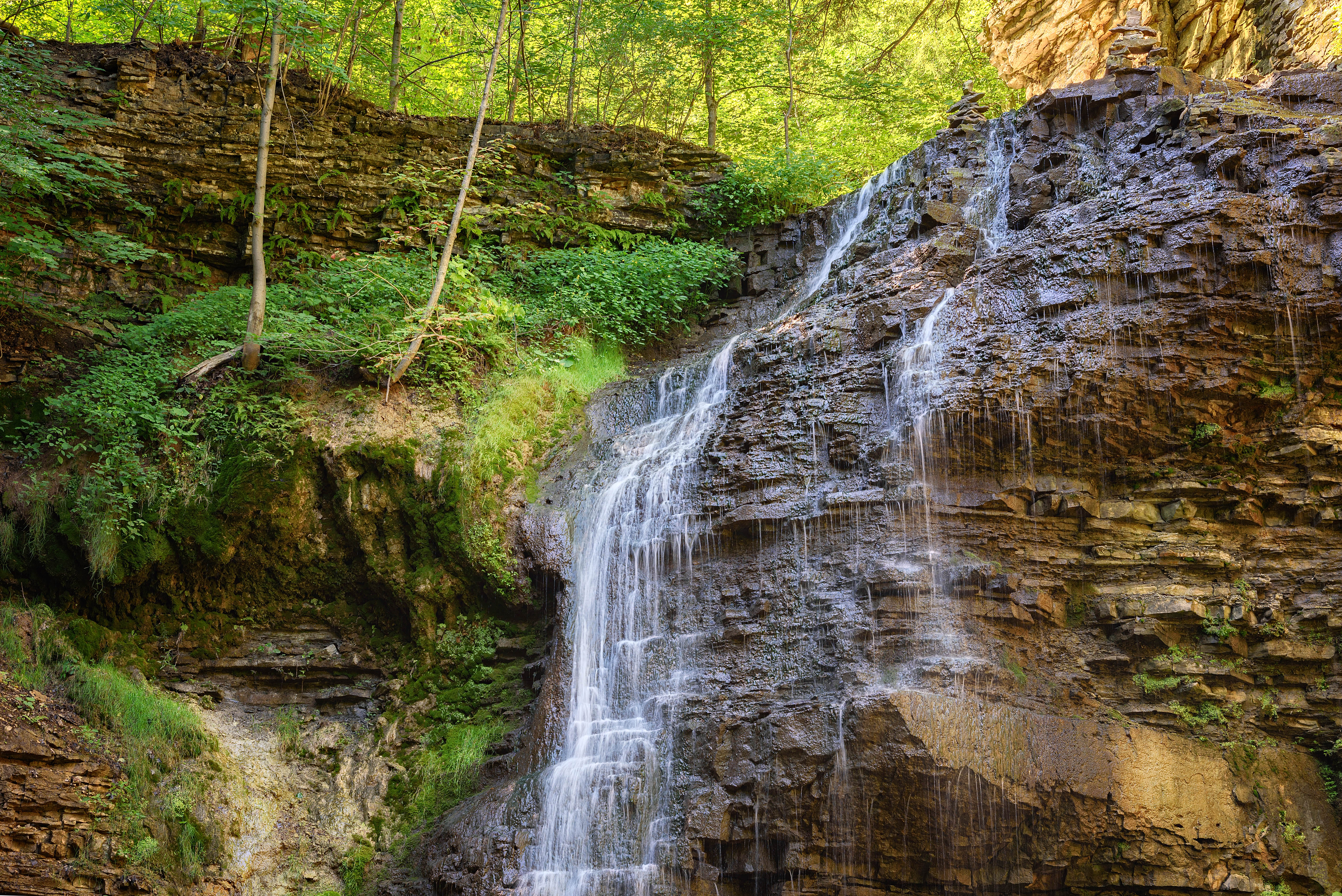
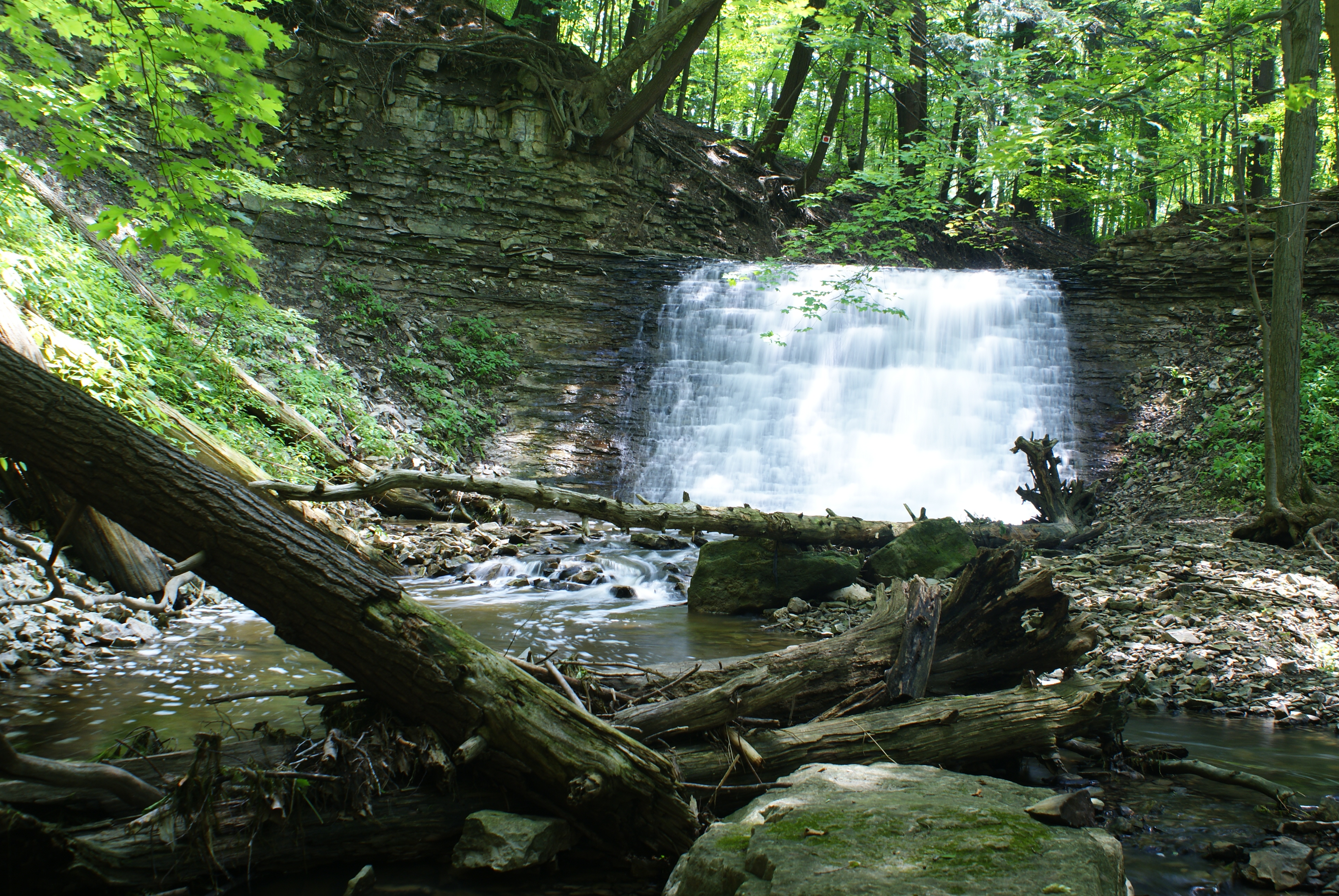
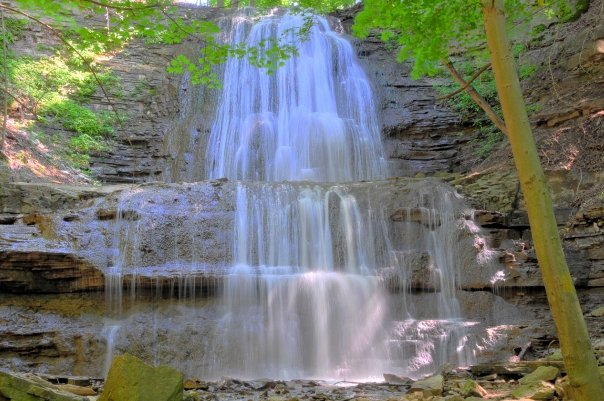
- Griffin House Ancaster Mill Tiffany Falls Washboard Falls Sherman Falls

- Location within City of Hamilton Location within Southern Ontario
- Coordinates: 43°13′32″N 79°58′36″W
- Country: Canada
- Province: Ontario
- City: Hamilton
- Established: 1792; 234 years ago (village)
- Incorporated: 1974; 52 years ago (town)
- Amalgamated: January 1, 2001; 25 years ago

Government
  - MP: John-Paul Danko
  - MPP: Sandy Shaw

Area
  - Total: 176.63 km^{2} (68.20 sq mi)

Population (2021)
  - Total: 40,557
  - Density: 229.6/km^{2} (595/sq mi)
- Time zone: UTC– 05:00 (EST)
  - Summer (DST): UTC– 04:00 (EDT)
- Forward sortation area: L9G, L9K
- Area codes: 905 and 289

Ancaster is a community in the city of Hamilton in the Canadian province of Ontario. Founded in 1792, it immediately developed itself into one of the first significant and influential early British Upper Canada communities established during the late 18th century, eventually amalgamating with the city of Hamilton in 2001. By 1823, due to its accessible waterpower and location at the juncture of prehistoric trading routes, Ancaster had become Upper Canada's largest industrial and commercial centre. Additionally, Ancaster had at that time attracted the 2nd largest populace (1,681) in Upper Canada, trailing only Kingston (population 2,500), but surpassing the populations of nearby Toronto (1,376) and Hamilton (1,000).

After this initial period of prosperity in the late 18th century, sudden significant water and rail transportation advancements of the early 19th century would soon better benefit Ancaster's neighbouring towns nearer the Lake Ontario waterfront. Stationary steam engines for industries rapidly developing in the 19th century would eventually make Ancaster's water-powered industries less vital. As a result, after the 1820s, Ancaster's influence would begin to wane during the remainder of the 19th century.

From the late 19th century, Ancaster's population would remain static until 1946, when new subdivisions around the village were established. The population expanded further with the completion of the Hamilton-Ancaster section of Highway 403 in 1968 and the introduction of sewer systems in 1974. After 1970, its population has grown steadily from 15,000 residents to its present-day count of 40,557. It was a municipality until 2001, when it was amalgamated with Hamilton, Dundas, Stoney Creek, Flamborough and Glanbrook to form the City of Hamilton.

== Geography, economy and population ==
Ancaster's geography has had a very significant effect on human settlement patterns throughout its prehistory and in the present day. A highly influential geographical formation has been the Niagara Escarpment, which consists primarily of limestone formed from ancient, fossilized sea organisms that stretches from present-day New York State through Ontario to Illinois. The escarpment created the waterpower that encouraged early European settlers to gravitate to the area in the late 1700s. However, this energy source would not have been accessible if the escarpment had not been navigable. This long-meandering landform was an almost impassible transportation barrier for past indigenous cultures for thousands of years. However, a natural break in this escarpment in the precise area that would become Ancaster village had for millennia created an opportunity for people to traverse up and down the escarpment, providing a relatively easy navigable land transportation gateway from the head of the lake to the surrounding land on the escarpment and vice versa.

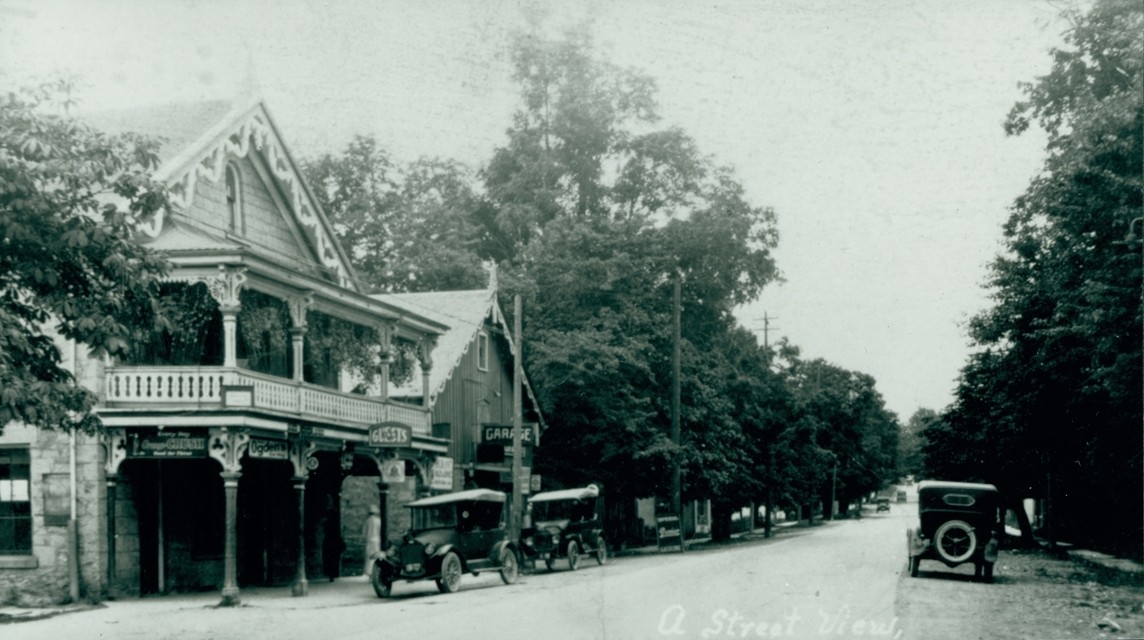
Ancaster Village circa 1927–32

The former municipality had a population of 33,232 in the 2006 census, a considerable increase from the 2001 census of 27,485. Development in the historic village core has been tightly controlled. Its current population growth and building boom occur mainly on the east side of Highway 403 in such typically suburban commercial developments as the Power Centre and residential developments such as the Meadowlands. It has resided in the 905 area code since the latter's creation, and its telephone exchange prefixes are 648 and 304, the majority being 648.

== History ==
The creation of the Upper and Lower Canadian provinces (colonies) from the division of the Province of Quebec (1763–1791) colony by the Parliament of Great Britain's Constitutional Act of 1791 had a deciding influence on the timing of the founding of Ancaster. At its inception, Upper Canada was only sparsely settled (unlike the more established Lower Canada), and its land had not been officially surveyed to any great extent. Thus, there was an urgency by the then Lieutenant Governor of Upper Canada John Graves Simcoe to survey this new and relatively barren province for establishing military roads and for preventing settlers from clearing and settling land not legally belonging to them. Predating Upper Canada, however, the earliest European settlers to arrive and clear land in the mid-18th century in what would eventually become Ancaster were mostly a wilderness society made up of American farmers travelling north searching for arable land and to a lesser extent French-speaking fur traders and British immigrants travelling southward. Also arriving at this area again travelling north in substantial numbers around 1787 with the incentive of inexpensive land grants were the United Empire Loyalists still loyal to the British crown who were fleeing from the United States after the 1776 American War of Independence. Britain's promise of free land brought many people from the new republic to the south and east, who did not exhibit the same loyalty to the crown as the Loyalists. This would eventually lead to a series of defections, accusations and treasonous acts during the War of 1812 that precipitated the largest mass hangings in Canadian history, the so-called Bloody Assize of 1814 whose trial took place in Ancaster in 1814. When the United States invaded Upper Canada during the War of 1812, its occupants were primarily of American ancestry. However, after the war, the province would have a noticeably more British-centred influence. Britain expected its colonies to purchase all essential finished goods needed for day-to-day living from the mother country in exchange for raw materials such as fur and lumber. However, this 'arrangement' naturally proved to be very inefficient and impractical in practice, so waterwheels, mills and factories soon hurriedly evolved in favourable towns in Upper Canada that had abundant waterpower, fertile soil, and good transportation access, such as Ancaster that could then provide the new settlers with a good measure of self-sufficiency.

In an age before steam power, the wilderness that would become Ancaster had an early economic advantage because it existed amidst a natural break in the Niagara Escarpment. Thus, even its relatively minor water resources were valuable because they were easily accessible. Just as vital an influence in Ancaster's rapid development was that it already had access to two crucial prehistoric First Nations roads. The first European settlers to set foot in this region would have encountered the Iroquois Trail and the Mohawk Trail intersecting precisely in the area that would eventually become Ancaster Village. This aboriginal Iroquois trail had become the most critical transportation route in Upper Canada. It meandered down the escarpment from the future Ancaster into what would eventually become Hamilton, Ontario, towards present-day Lewiston, New York, eventually linking up with similar aboriginal trails in New York. In the other direction, the Iroquois trail led from present-day Ancaster to what would eventually become the town of Brantford, Ontario, at which point the trail branched off into the Detroit Path and the Long Point trail. By 1770, the 80-kilometre Mohawk Trail was essentially the escarpment accompaniment of the lakeside Iroquois trail. The Mohawk Trail ran parallel to the Iroquois Trail. It originated and diverged from the Iroquois Trail in present-day Queenston, Ontario, until finally ending and reconnecting to the Iroquois Trail in present-day Ancaster at what is now known as the intersection of Rousseaux and Wilson Street. The two trails had been interconnected in four locations along the Mohawk Trail's 80-kilometre route when favourable escarpment conditions permitted. By 1785, the Iroquois Trail passing through present-day Ancaster had been widened to accommodate horse and buggy traffic. Another influential road that intersected the Mohawk Trail very close to Ancaster Village was the Twenty Mile Road that followed the Twenty Mile Creek up to present day Smithville, Ontario, and beyond. Lastly, Ancaster also had fertile soil and abundant fresh water, which encouraged pioneer settlers to arrive in this region to clear the land and plant crops for subsistence agriculture.

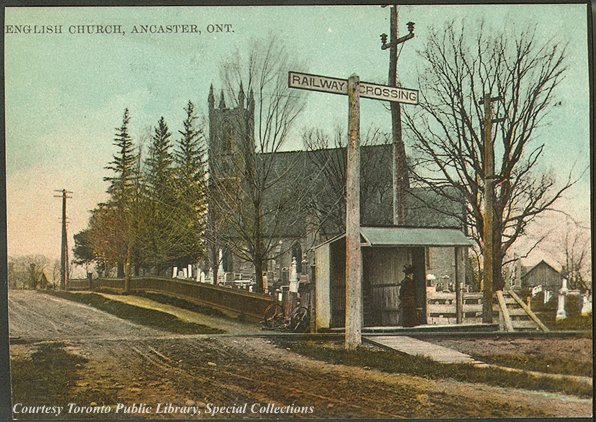
Ancaster, 1910

Ancaster was established formally in 1792, but the area now referred to as Ancaster Village had been referred to informally by local villagers by the more colourful name of Wilson's Mills. This was in reference to millwright James Wilson, who, along with his affluent fur trader, entrepreneur and business partner Richard Beasley, were the primary founders of Ancaster village. With Beasley's financial backing, Wilson built a gristmill in 1791 and a sawmill in 1792 that would be the only mills west of Grimsby for many years. To attract workers to his mills, Wilson needed to provide the social amenities and commercial framework for an area of land that, in that period, was an isolated frontier forest with accessible waterpower situated precisely at the juncture of already well-established pre-historical indigenous transportation trails. In that period, the area was populated with just a smattering of First Nations aboriginal peoples and wilderness farmers. Again, with Beasley's financial assistance, Wilson managed to generate the impetus for a community by constructing a general store, a blacksmith shop, a distillery, and a tavern, all within walking distance of his mills. As a result, Wilson's newly arrived employees began to build their homes near their place of work and thus the necessary factors were in place for the community of Wilson's Mills to thrive. Wilson's primary residence was also used as a school, a magistrate's court and a cooperage. To this day, the main street that winds through the historical Ancaster Village that once was a section of the original aboriginal Iroquois Trail still bears the legacy of Wilson's name. By 1793, an area containing Wilson's Mills was finally surveyed and officially became known as Ancaster Township as chosen by John Graves Simcoe. Simcoe was apparently inspired in the name choice by Peregrine Bertie, the 3rd Duke of Ancaster and Kesteven. Thus, Wilson's Mills was indirectly renamed Ancaster after the historic village in the county of Lincolnshire, England.

In 1794, Wilson sold his half share of the gristmill and sawmill business to Montreal-born fur trader, interpreter, businessman, militia officer and office holder Jean Rousseaux "St. John," who already had a home and general store on Wilson Street. Rousseaux's Ancaster general store experienced frequent trading with Joseph Brant's Mohawks and other Iroquois people from the Six Nations confederacy located at the Grand River. Rousseaux would eventually buy out Beasley's remaining share of the mills in 1797. Rousseaux had also been Governor Simcoe's official native and French interpreter and was also a close confidante and advisor to native leader Joseph Brant. James Wilson at this point moved away and the local villagers by 1795 gradually began referring to the community of Wilson's Mills as Ancaster Village. Curiously, the detailed whereabouts or activities of James Wilson after his departure are not well documented. There is evidence that Wilson was born before 1755, had a wife and three children but his burial location is unknown. With the profits from this business transaction Rousseaux built the Union Hotel in 1797 on Wilson Street, which is now remembered as the location of the Bloody Assize trials in 1814 during the War of 1812. By building his hotel on Wilson Street, Rousseaux reversed the trend of building exclusively on the Mohawk trail. In 1794–1797, Rousseaux also added a general store, brewery and distillery as well as hiring Ancaster's first school teacher. His accomplishments include being the first assessor, tax collector, magistrate, and the Township's first Lieutenant Colonel of the Militia. Rousseaux also became a considerable landowner, assisted significantly with native relations, was able to bridge French and English cultures successfully and was instrumental in the early development of Ancaster and old York. Rousseaux eventually resold the mills to the Union Mill Company in 1802, and they ultimately were destroyed by fire in 1812. However, the mills' brief 20 years of service (1791–1812) provided the initial catalyst for the economic and social development of Ancaster Township. Rousseaux died of pleurisy at Fort George (Niagara-on-the-Lake) during the War of 1812.

In 1798, the Hatt brothers Richard and Samuel from Dundas established their Red Mill downstream below Ancaster Falls at the base of the so-called "devil's elbow". They also widened the original native trail into what would eventually be known as the Old Ancaster-Dundas Road to provide better commercial access. In 1799, William Vanderlip built a hotel that, in 1844, was sold to Adam Duff. This gave birth to the nickname 'Duff's Corners' for describing this well-known intersection on Highway 53. By 1800, native mail couriers had been established between Montreal and Detroit, with Ancaster appointed as the branching point for Queenston. In 1805, the Hatt brothers bought most of the village site from James Wilson and subdivided it into streets and building lots. By 1810, the population of Ancaster had steadily risen to 400 residents, yet in just seven years, by 1817, its populace would more than double to 1,037. In that same year, Robert Gourlay carefully documented that Ancaster had 162 houses, four gristmills, five sawmills, 1 carding machine, 1 fulling mill, five doctors, 1 Anglican minister, and 1 Methodist meeting house. In 1820, Job Lodor acquired the Union Mill Company and rejuvenated Ancaster's industrial base. By 1823, the first post office was established. In 1824, the Ancaster Union Church was built. By 1825, Ancaster had constructed a public reading room with papers from Niagara, York, and New York. A foundry that made ploughshares was established in 1825 by William Wiard. In 1826, Jacob Gabel started a tannery, Robert Douglas began a brewery, and John Galt established Ancaster as his headquarters for the Canada Company. 1827 marked the year that inaugurated the publication of George Gurnett's Gore Gazette and the Ancaster, Hamilton, Dundas and Flamborough Advertiser. By 1835, Job Lodor was the only person in Upper Canada who managed to obtain banking privileges, and thus, the Gore Bank was established in the village in 1836. Also, in 1836, the population of Ancaster would reach 2,664. In 1837, a group of Red Coated Soldiers appeared in the village to announce the Mackenzie and Papineau rebellions. By 1840, Ancaster had five hotels. In 1844, Dr. Richardson opened his practice in the village. Eyre Thuresson founded a threshing machine factory in 1846, a stone mill in 1862, another card mill upstream in 1863 and reorganized the Cane Knitting Factory in 1865. In 1847, N. and E. Wiard re-opened the McLaughlin foundry to make ploughs. Harris and Alonzo Egleston arrived in 1832, began working at William Wiard's foundry, and eventually bought him out. The Egleston's then proceeded to expand their business empire, which included building a foundry in 1843 employing 25 people and rebuilding a gristmill in 1863 at the present-day location of the Old Ancaster Mill on the old Dundas Road. This Egleston mill was the 4th Ancaster mill and the third to be rebuilt at this current location. Wilson's original mills burnt down in 1812. Upon rebuilding, Wilson's mills were relocated from this original site at Wilson and Rousseaux Street a little further downstream and rebuilt in stone at the present Old Ancaster Mill location on Old Dundas Road. Again, a second mill burnt down in 1818 at this location, and a third was damaged by fire in 1854. Wilson's original 1791–1792 mill foundations still exist 75 yards upstream from the Wilson and Rousseaux Street intersection but are hidden with vegetation. The restored and modified remnants of Egleston's 1854 mill now operate as a restaurant and banquet hall. The Barracks of 1812 still stand as a reminder of the War of 1812. By May 1866, the first public telephone was set up in Gurnett's store but was disconnected from lack of use.

By 1869, Ancaster was a village in the Township of Ancaster County Wentworth with a population of 500. Mr. K. Thuresson turned out card clothing. The Ancaster Knitting Company employed over 100 in the manufacture of knitted goods. Messrs. H & A Egleston manufactured agricultural implements, cotton, and woollen machinery. Mr. A. Egleston employed 20 in woollen and cloth mills.

In 1871, the still-existing and well-maintained Ancaster Township Hall opened at an initial cost of $2,400. Additional examples of Victorian architecture are also located on Wilson Street, amongst them the Richardson residence, built in 1872 as a wedding present for Dr. Henry Richardson and his new bride, Sarah Egleston. Other similar structures include St. John's Church 1869, the Gurnett Home 1826, Gurnett General Store 1826, Hammill House 1860, the Egleston House, Job Lodor's Home 1820, Rousseau Hotel 1832 and the Thuresson Home 1872 to name just a few. The oldest building in Ancaster is the Tisdale house at 314 Wilson Street, which was built c. 1806 and whose current function is a police museum. The travelling expedition of Edison's phonograph was exhibited in the Township Hall in 1878. In 1891, John Heslop was murdered in his home on Mineral Springs Road, and the murder case remains unsolved. After 1900, affluent Hamilton industrialists began purchasing farmland close to Ancaster village for building estates. By 1946, housing subdivisions began to be established around the village and thus started the post-World War II population expansion that continues to this present day with the current housing construction in the Meadowlands subdivision.

Ancaster's dominant position in the region as an influential industrial, commercial, and farming community throughout the late 18th and early 19th centuries would soon be short-lived due to sudden modern transportation advancements in its neighbouring towns. Soon nearby Dundas and a small farm settlement close to the lakefront that by 1833 would be established as the town of Hamilton would soon become more influential mainly because of the successful completion of the following three transportation projects: the completion of the Burlington Canal in 1832 that connected Burlington Bay (Hamilton Harbour) to Lake Ontario, the completion of the Desjardins Canal in 1837 that enabled lake vessels to enter nearby Dundas through Hamilton Harbour and the completion in 1855 of The Great Western Railway connection to Hamilton (and eventually Dundas) enabled Hamilton, which already had flourishing and expanding ports, to become the prominent urban and commercial settlement in the region. Another factor in Ancaster's gradual economic decline was that stationary steam engines by the 1840s had begun powering industries; thus, locating industries adjacent to waterpower was less vital. In fact, by this period, even Ancaster had started introducing steam power to its factories; however, it could no longer compete economically with Hamilton's natural shipping harbour and railway. A final contributing factor to Hamilton's dominance was the fact it was chosen to be the administrative centre for the new Gore District in 1816 and was voted to be the county town instead of Ancaster. Ancaster had been the leading candidate in 1812 to be the county town, and a petition had been signed with 200 signatures to strengthen that proposal further. The petitioners had argued that Ancaster's advantages were its flourishing Union Mills and other industries combined with its elegant setting, which they believed would make it the most suitable candidate for building a new county courthouse. However, the War of 1812 had interrupted this original selection process, and by 1816 the promising village of Hamilton was chosen instead even though Ancaster at that time was still the most influential village in Western Upper Canada.

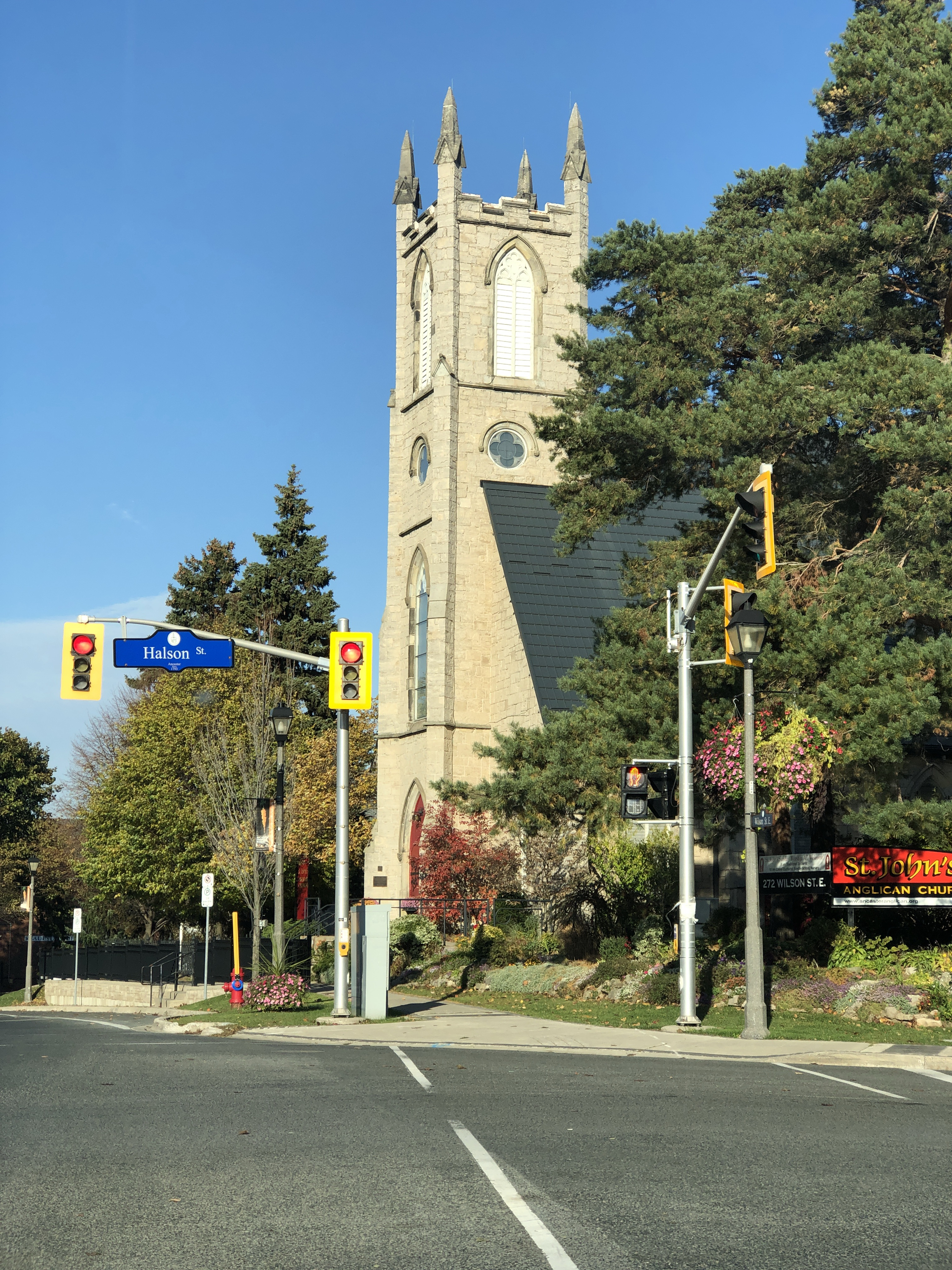
St John's Anglican Church. Ancaster, Ontario. October 2022

In the latter half of the 19th century, Ancaster became an unimposing gristmill hamlet and police village. Ancaster's many derelict, burnt down, or abandoned factories, such as the gutted four-story knitting mill and the ruined tannery littered its surroundings in that era like modern ruins that shouted at a former glory. The economic reality was that these former Ancaster factories would be rebuilt elsewhere. Ancaster would not have access to a modern transportation system until the Brantford and Hamilton Electric Railway intersected Ancaster Village in 1907, thus making fresh milk and other perishable foods, general supplies and mail easily deliverable daily for the first time. The arrival of the B&H radial line corresponded with the inevitable process of change that Ancaster was undergoing, which is recognizable today from that of a former prominent industrial and highly influential self-sufficient village to its current status as a bedroom community of Hamilton. The evidence for this radial train is still easily visible in Ancaster village by a well-maintained gravel path behind St. John's Anglican Church on Wilson Street. Walkers and cyclists can still follow this old radial line path down the escarpment (behind Meadowlands Shopping Centre) to the Hamilton Chedoke Golf Course. The radial line was dismantled in 1931 as a condition of sale from the Cataract Company. With the advent of competition from the automobile and bus companies in North America at the turn of the 20th century, generally, only publicly owned streetcar companies had the financial means to survive into the 1950s.

At the end of the 19th century, the townsfolk of Ancaster were indeed conscious that their town had once been a glowing star in Upper Canada that had quickly lost its lustre during the Victorian age despite its second successful wave of industrialization in the 1820s. In 1897, local author Alma Dick-Lauder, writing about Ancaster in the Hamilton Spectator using the colourful language of that time, lamented that:

So who can say that new life may not once more flow to the aged village, now high and dry on old time's sand banks, bringing back her bright meridian bloom and vigour of 70 years ago? Fanned by the breath of electricity to spring like a Phoenix from her bed of ashes-ashes, understand, being principally the matter choking up the old place with a fire record unequalled since the days of Sodom, making her an object of terror to her friend, derision to her foes and a hoo-doo to the guileless insurance agent. It is rather melancholy, on a summer's day, to stand on the high bridge and watch the waters slouching by like a gang of crystal dwarfs out of a job, idling and playing and painting the 'beautiful, waving hair of the dead' grass green among the fallen ruins, which a few years ago were instinct with the hum of industry, pouring forth at stated hours, with jangle of bells, a cheerful, clattering stream of bread winners, giving life and animation to the scene, in contrast to the occasional man who now meets the casual glance up street in the sunny noon hours.

Alma Dick-Lauder was referring to the fact that by 1897, although Ancaster Township had a population of 4,000, the solitary industry remained Egleston's gristmill. The "fire record" that Alma was referring to include the burning of the following: John J. Ryckman's store in 1841, St. Johns Church in 1868, The Ancaster Knitting Factory in 1875, the Morris S. Lowrey Hotel in 1881, Egleston's foundry in 1883, Thuresson's Foundry in 1884 and finally the Ancaster Carriage Factory in 1885. By Alma's expression of the 'meridian bloom of 70 years ago', she was referring to the fact that in 1820, Job Lodor had purchased the Union Mills and, in so doing, had instantly transformed Ancaster's industrial centre to the point where it was once again, albeit temporarily, the unrivalled commercial and industrial hub of the Gore district. At the time of Alma's 1897 newspaper article, Ancaster had gone from having three schools in 1835 to just one remaining school but had developed cultural institutions such as an orchestra, a literary society, and an enclosed curling rink. Job Lodor, as well as many other prominent as well as lesser-known early Ancaster settlers, left behind sometimes still legible tombstones and grave markers in the cemeteries belonging to St. John's Anglican and St. Andrew's Presbyterian Churches located on Wilson Street.

The Ancaster Fair has been an annual agricultural and social event since 1850, except for 1937, when it was cancelled due to a case of infantile paralysis and 2020, when it was cancelled due to the COVID-19 pandemic. Initially, the fair was held at Wilson and Academy Streets in the Village core. In 1894, it moved to Wilson and Cameron Drive driving park, where it remained until its centennial year in 1950 when it moved to Garner Road. After nearly 60 years at the Garner Road site, in 2009, the Ancaster Fair moved to 630 Trinity Road.

In 1976, an Ancaster Town Council vote reversed a long-standing policy that would finally allow Ancaster restaurants to apply for liquor licences. Other than the LCBO and Brewers Retail outlets that were established in Ancaster in the 1950s, the village had, up to that point, been 'dry,' presumably since Prohibition in Canada. Ancaster's earlier pioneers, however, experienced an entirely different social environment. Again, according to Dick-Lauder writing in 1897, "Ancaster saw plenty of life during the rebellion of 1837 when it was quite a frequent thing for all the inns, five in number, and many of the private houses to be full overnight of redcoats passing towards the west."

During this period, Ancaster Township was attached variously to Nassau District, Home District, York County (West Riding) and Halton County. When Halton County and Wentworth County joined temporarily from 1850 to 1854, Ancaster remained permanently attached to Wentworth County, where it remains today in the Regional Municipality of Hamilton-Wentworth

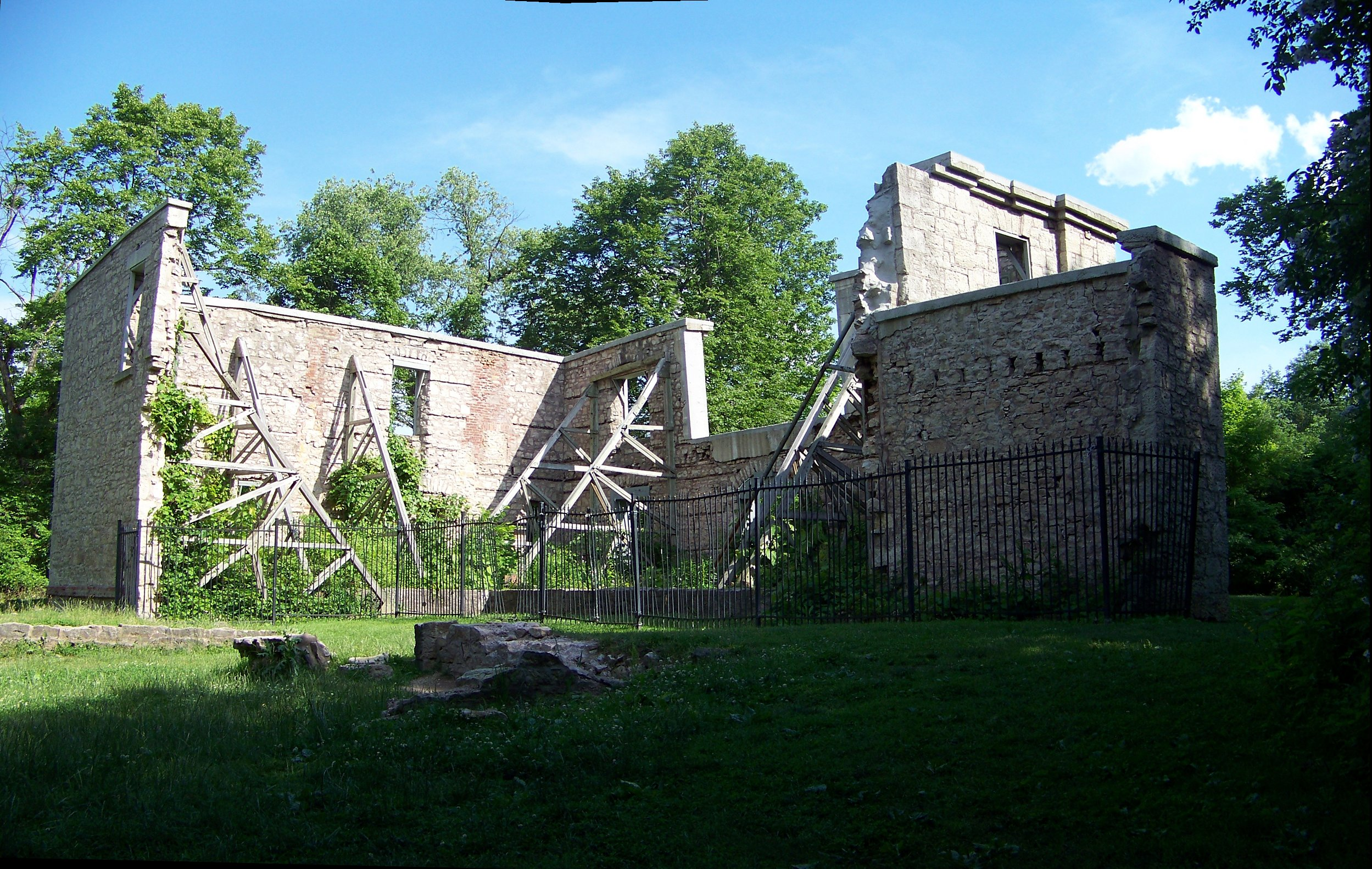
Ruins of the Hermitage

The Hermitage is a popular site in Ancaster. This historic house was once the property of Reverend George Sheed in 1830. Since then, the house had changed ownership many times before burning to the ground in 1934. The last owner of The Hermitage was, in fact, local author Alma Dick-Lauder, who has been referenced above. The fire that eventually consumed The Hermitage occurred directly from a party she had been hosting. The shell of the old house and surrounding buildings can still be visited today. One of the main draws of this old property is the legend of the property being haunted. "Ghost tours" run throughout the summer, with the tour guides telling haunted stories of the land and the surrounding county. Griffin House is a historic house associated with the Underground Railroad.

== Government ==
When it became part of the Regional Municipality of Hamilton–Wentworth in 1974, the Town of Ancaster absorbed the Township of Ancaster (including other hamlets like Jerseyville, Lynden and Alberton). The new town had two representatives on the regional council, which totalled (with the Regional Chair) about 20 members.

It was amalgamated with the City of Hamilton in 2001. The amalgamation was unexpected, particularly since the Progressive Conservative MPP Toni Skarica government had promised in the last election that the amalgamation would not occur. Skarica resigned in protest, and a local Flamborough Mayor, Ted McMeekin, who led the fight in opposing the amalgamation, won the Liberal party nomination, winning the by-election on an anti-amalgamation platform. Nonetheless, the amalgamation was not rescinded by the Harris government.

Since the 2015 election, the community is in the Hamilton West-Ancaster-Dundas federal electoral district, represented by John-Paul Danko of the Liberal Party of Canada, and in the Hamilton West-Ancaster-Dundas provincial electoral district represented by Sandy Shaw of the Ontario New Democratic Party.

== Education ==
Ancaster was part of the Wentworth County Board of Education since its inception and was covered by the Hamilton-Wentworth District School Board when it was created in 1998. Until 2005, the town's only public secondary education institution was Ancaster High and Vocational School. Since 2005 it has no longer been classified as a vocational school and the name is now Ancaster High School. Other secondary schools in Ancaster are Bishop Tonnos Secondary School, belonging to the Hamilton-Wentworth Catholic District School Board and Hamilton District Christian High School, an independent Christian high school that moved to Ancaster in 1989.

Public elementary schools in Ancaster include Ancaster Meadow, Tiffany Hills, Frank Panabaker (formerly Fessenden), Rousseau, and Spring Valley (formerly C.H. Bray). In 2020, students in these schools began attending from kindergarten to Grade 8. The former Ancaster Senior public school for grades 7–8 then became the North campus of Frank Panabaker Elementary. However, the street east of the school retained the name Senior Drive. In the Catholic elementary school system, St. Ann's, St. Joachim's, Holy Name of Mary, and Immaculate Conception students (kindergarten to grade 8) generally end up at Bishop Tonnos Secondary School.

Postsecondary education is only available at Redeemer University, a Christian institution closely associated with the Christian Reformed Church. It was incorporated in 1980, and classes began in Hamilton two years later. It built a campus in Ancaster in 1986, where it had its first graduating class. It cooperated with McMaster University, providing some instructors and cross-listed courses. By 2000, it had acquired its present name, and its graduates obtained Bachelor of Science and Bachelor of Arts degrees instead of Bachelor of Christian Studies degrees.

The Ancaster Public Library, a branch of the Hamilton Public Library System, originated in 1955 as a member of the Library System of Ontario. It was eventually relocated to 300 Wilson Street East in 1967 as a Centennial project after several previous moves. The library was reopened on November 27, 2006, after an extensive project that extended the library to include the entire first floor of the building.

== Sports and recreation ==
The Hamilton Golf and Country Club was founded in 1894 and was initially sited beside the Hamilton Jockey Club (now Centre Mall), moving to Ancaster in 1916. It hosted the Canadian Open in 2003, 2006, 2012 and 2019.

The Ancaster Rotary Centre is an addition to Morgan Firestone Arena and includes a fitness centre and daycare. This complex is surrounded by the Robert E. Wade Park, which includes four baseball diamonds and five soccer fields. A 10.1-million-dollar addition of a second ice rink to Morgan Firestone Arena was completed in March 2011.

The Ancaster Little League Park is located on Jerseyville Road in Spring Valley, nestled on the edge of the Dundas Valley Conservation Area. There are three diamonds in Little League Park, known locally as T-Ball, Minor and Major. Beginning in 1970, Ancaster has hosted an annual (so-called) 'World T-ball' tournament. In 2010 and 2019, Ancaster hosted the Canadian Little League Championships, and Little League Park was the main venue. Before hosting the Canadian Little League Championships, the central baseball diamond underwent a significant reconstruction. With help from the city, Province, and Federal Government, the diamond was rebuilt with proper drainage, professional-style clay base paths and warning track, a new PA system, and the construction of a new clubhouse.

Other recreational centres include:

- Morgan Firestone Arena
- Ancaster Rotary Centre
- Ancaster Tennis Club
- Ancaster Lions outdoor pool
- Ancaster Little League Ball Park
- Ancaster Aquatic Centre
- Spring Valley Arena

== Nature ==
The Hamilton Conservation Authority (sometimes in conjunction with the City of Hamilton) operates several sites in Ancaster. Fieldcote Memorial Park and Museum showcases local history (including the area's participation in the Underground Railway), fine arts, gardens and walking paths.

The Bruce Trail snakes through Ancaster as it links Queenston with Tobermory. The walking path goes through part of the Dundas Valley Conservation Area and crosses the Hamilton to Brantford Rail Trail.

== Annual events ==
- Ancaster Community Food Drive (March)
- Paris To Ancaster Bicycle Race (April)
- Lobsterfest (May)
- Ancaster Heritage Days (June)
- Ancaster Old Mill Road Race (June)
- Ancaster Fair (September)
- Ancaster Christmas Tree Lighting (December)

== Notable people ==
- Taylor Accursi – professional ice hockey player for the Buffalo Beauts
- Bertram Brockhouse – Nobel Prize Winner (Physics)
- Bob Cameron – elected to the Canadian Football Hall of Fame in 2010.
- Bryce Davison – Olympic figure skater
- Scott Dickens – 2004, 2012 Canadian Olympian (breastroke), 2007 Pan American Games Gold Medalist and former Ancaster High Waterpolo player
- Michelle Dubé – CTV Toronto news personality
- Stephen Elop – former CEO of Finnish mobile phone company Nokia, former executive VP of Microsoft's Devices & Services business unit.
- Ameer Idreis – author of The Ewald Series
- Jane Johnston Schoolcraft – recognized as the first known Native American literary writer and poet, buried at St. John's Anglican Church (she died in 1842 while bars visiting a sister.)
- Phoebe Judson – founder of Lynden, Washington
- Karen Kain – Canadian former ballet dancer, and the artistic director of the National Ballet of Canada
- Bob Lanois – musician, producer, and recording engineer (Simply Saucer, Raffi, Blackie and the Rodeo Kings).
- Daniel Lanois – musician and producer (Bob Dylan, U2, Peter Gabriel).
- Michael Lee-Chin – one of Canada's wealthiest men
- Michela Luci – child actress (Cook'd, Dino Dana, Endlings, True and the Rainbow Kingdom)
- Ron MacLean – Canadian sportscaster for the CBC, lived in Ancaster 1989–'92
- Marcia MacMillan – CTV News Channel
- Brad Martin – 2006, 2010 and 2014 Canadian Olympian (Snowboarding)
- Marilyn McHarg – humanitarian executive, former president and CEO of Dignitas International and founding member and General Director of the Canadian section of Doctors without Borders
- Frank Panabaker – A professional artist (painter) who lived most of his life in Ancaster, Ontario. He was a member of Allied Artists of America, an associate member of the Royal Canadian Academy and a member of the board of trustees for the National Gallery of Canada for the period (1959–1966)
- Summer Mortimer – swimmer, multiple Paralympic medals, world records
- Alyssa Nicole Pallett – Actress and Glamour model
- Melissa Tancredi – 2012 Canadian Olympian (Soccer – team bronze medal), Canadian Soccer Association, Pro Soccer player
- Clementina Trenholme Fessenden – Founder of Empire Day (1898), later known as Commonwealth Day.
- Bob Young – former CEO of Red Hat, Inc., current owner of the Hamilton Tiger-Cats
- Victoria Snow – film and television actress.

== See also ==
- List of townships in Ontario
