= Meadowlands, Hamilton =

Coordinates: 43°13′10″N 79°56′40″W

Meadowlands is a suburban neighbourhood in Hamilton, Ontario, in Ancaster. Its boundaries can be defined as Lincoln M. Alexander Parkway & Highway 403 on the north, Garner Road on the south, Stone Church Road on the east, and Southcote Road on the west. The name of the neighbourhood is an inspiration of the developer, who took it from the Meadowlands Arena in New Jersey after driving past the venue.

Meadowlands is both one of the wealthiest, and one of the most ethnically diverse neighbourhoods within Hamilton.
