= Sun Media =

Defunct Canadian newspaper chain

Sun Media Corporation
- Type: Subsidiary
- Industry: Printing
- Founded: 4 February 1978; 48 years ago (as Sun Publishing)
- Defunct: 13 April 2015
- Fate: Sold to Postmedia Network
- Headquarters: Toronto, Ontario, Canada
- Key people: Pierre Karl Péladeau (former President & CEO)
- Products: Newspapers
- Parent: Postmedia Network Inc

Sun Media Corporation was the owner of several tabloid and broadsheet newspapers in Canada and the 49% owner of the now defunct Sun News Network. It was a subsidiary of Quebecor Media.

Quebecor sold its 74 community newspapers in Quebec to TC Transcontinental in June 2014, under a deal first announced in December 2013.

On October 6, 2014, Quebecor Media announced the sale of the remaining English-language print assets of Sun Media to rival Postmedia. The sale included neither the Sun News Network, which subsequently closed when a buyer was not found, nor Quebecor's French-language papers Le Journal de Montréal and Le Journal de Québec. The sale was approved by the federal Competition Bureau on March 25, 2015, and closed on April 13. Canoe Sun Media merged with Postmedia rather than being maintained as a separate division.

== History ==
Sun Publishing was formed on February 4, 1978 through the amalgamation of Toronto Sun Holdings Ltd and Toronto Sun Publishing Ltd. The two companies had been formed in 1971 with the launch of the Toronto Sun by former staffers of the defunct Toronto Telegram. On February 14, 1978, the Edmonton Sun, the second member of what would become the Sun chain, was announced through a partnership of Sun Media and Edmonton Sun Publishing Ltd. The paper was launched on April 2, 1978. In 1981, the outstanding shares of Edmonton Sun Publishing Ltd were acquired by Sun Media. The company purchased the Calgary Albertan on July 31, 1980 for $1.3 million and relaunched it days later as the Calgary Sun, with the same format and appearance as its sister papers.

In 1979, it purchased the United Press International's Canadian subsidiary, the former British United Press. It ran the news agency for several years before selling it to Canadian Press in 1985.

In 1983, 50% of Sun Media was acquired by Maclean-Hunter for $55 million. That same year, Sun Media, with Maclean-Hunter's backing, acquired the Houston Post for $100 million in an attempt to expand into the United States. It was sold for $150 million four years later. In 1987, Maclean-Hunter's Financial Post weekly was sold to Sun Media for $46 million and was relaunched as a daily tabloid financial newspaper the following year. In 1988, Sun Media acquired the Ottawa Sunday Herald which it would relaunch as the daily Ottawa Sun.

In 1994, Maclean-Hunter was purchased by Rogers Communications. Two years later, on October 4, 1996, the management of the Sun chain under the leadership of Paul Godfrey purchased Rogers' share of the Sun Publishing and renamed the company Sun Media. In 1998, the Financial Post was sold to Southam Inc. in exchange for the Hamilton Spectator, the Kitchener-Waterloo Record, the Guelph Mercury, and the Cambridge Reporter. Also in 1998, Sun Media was purchased by Quebecor and maintained as a wholly owned subsidiary of it. Godfrey had sought out Quebecor as a "white knight" in order to frustrate an attempted hostile takeover by the Sun's longtime rival, the Toronto Star. In 1999, Quebecor sold the four recently acquired southern Ontario newspapers to the owners of the Toronto Star and became part of its Metroland Media Group. Southam, owned by Conrad Black, would relaunch the Financial Post as the National Post. In 2007, Sun Media acquired and absorbed the Osprey Media chain of small English language newspapers mostly based in Ontario. In 2014, after years of cuts and restructuring, Quebecor sold its Sun Media division to Postmedia which, ironically, had former Sun Media CEO Paul Godfrey as its chief executive. The sale was completed in April 2015 and Sun Media was dissolved with its newspapers being absorbed by the Postmedia chain.

== Publications ==
=== Sun newspapers ===
- Calgary Sun
- Edmonton Sun
- Ottawa Sun
- Toronto Sun
- Winnipeg Sun

=== Le Journal newspapers ===
- Le Journal de Montréal
- Le Journal de Québec (Quebec City)

=== 24hrs newspapers ===
- 24heures Montreal
- 24hrs Toronto
- 24hrs Vancouver

=== Local daily newspapers ===
Alberta

- The Daily Herald-Tribune - Grande Prairie
- Fort McMurray Today - Fort McMurray

Manitoba

- Portage Daily Graphic - Portage la Prairie

Ontario

- Belleville Intelligencer - Belleville
- Brantford Expositor - Brantford
- Chatham Daily News - Chatham
- Cornwall Standard Freeholder - Cornwall
- Kingston Whig Standard - Kingston
- London Free Press - London
- Niagara Falls Review - Niagara Falls
- North Bay Nugget - North Bay
- Northumberland Today - Cobourg
- Orillia Packet and Times - Orillia
- Owen Sound Sun Times - Owen Sound
- Pembroke Daily Observer - Pembroke
- Peterborough Examiner - Peterborough
- Sarnia Observer - Sarnia
- Sault Star - Sault Ste. Marie
- Simcoe Reformer - Simcoe
- St. Catharines Standard - St. Catharines
- St. Thomas Times-Journal - St. Thomas
- Sudbury Star - Sudbury
- The Barrie Examiner - Barrie
- The Beacon Herald - Stratford
- The Recorder & Times - Brockville
- Timmins Daily Press - Timmins
- Welland Tribune - Welland
- Woodstock Sentinel-Review - Woodstock

=== Weekly newspapers ===
Alberta

- Airdrie Echo - Airdrie
- Bow Valley Crag & Canyon - Banff
- Camrose Canadian - Camrose
- Cochrane Times - Cochrane
- Cold Lake Sun - Cold Lake
- County Market - Leduc
- Devon Dispatch - Devon
- Drayton Valley Western Review - Drayton Valley
- Edmonton Examiner - Edmonton
- Edson Leader - Edson
- Fairview Post - Fairview
- Fort Saskatchewan Record - Fort Saskatchewan
- Hanna Herald - Hanna
- High River Times - High River
- Hinton Parklander - Hinton
- Lacombe Globe - Lacombe
- Leduc Representative - Leduc
- Mayerthorpe Freelancer - Mayerthorpe
- Meridian Booster - Lloydminster
- Nanton News - Nanton
- Peace Country Sun - Grande Prairie
- Peace River Record-Gazette - Peace River
- Pincher Creek Echo - Pincher Creek
- Sherwood Park News - Sherwood Park
- Spruce Grove Examiner - Spruce Grove
- Stony Plain Reporter - Stony Plain
- Strathmore Standard - Strathmore
- The Beaumont News - Beaumont
- Vermilion Standard - Vermilion
- Vulcan Advocate - Vulcan
- Wetaskiwin Times - Wetaskiwin
- Whitecourt Star - Whitecourt

Manitoba

- Altona Red River Valley Echo - Altona
- Carman Valley Leader - Carman
- Interlake Spectator - Gimli
- Morden Times - Morden
- Selkirk Journal - Selkirk
- Stonewall Argus and Teulon Times - Stonewall
- Winkler Times - Winkler

Ontario

- Bancroft This Week - Bancroft
- Barry's Bay This Week - Barry's Bay
- Bradford West Gwillimbury Times - Bradford
- Chatham This Week - Chatham
- Clinton News-Record - Clinton
- Cochrane Times-Post - Cochrane
- Collingwood Enterprise Bulletin - Collingwood
- County Weekly News - Prince Edward County
- Elliot Lake Standard - Elliot Lake
- Fort Erie Times - Fort Erie
- Frontenac This Week - Kingston
- Gananoque Reporter - Gananoque
- Goderich Signal Star - Goderich
- Haliburton Echo - Haliburton
- Hanover Post - Hanover
- Ingersoll Times - Ingersoll
- Innisfil Examiner - Innisfil
- InPort News - Port Colborne
- Kapuskasing Times - Kapuskasing
- Kenora Daily Miner and News - Kenora
- Kincardine News - Kincardine
- Kingston This Week - Kingston
- Lakeshore Advance - Grand Bend
- Lake of the Woods Enterprise - Kenora
- Leader-Spirit - Dresden
- Lucknow Sentinel - Lucknow
- Mid-North Monitor - Espanola
- Petrolia Topic - Petrolia

Saskatchewan

- Melfort Journal - Melfort
- Nipawin Journal - Nipawin

=== Magazines ===
- Biz Magazine
- Business London
- Hamilton Halton Weddings
- Hamilton Magazine
- Kingston Life
- Muskoka Cottage Home Property
- Muskoka Magazine
- Muskoka Trails
- Niagara Magazine
- Ontario Farmer
- Sault Good Life
- Simcoe Life
- Vines Magazine
- What's Up Muskoka

== Former assets ==
=== Closed ===
The following publications have been closed by Sun Media:

- 24 Hours in Ottawa, Calgary and Edmonton
- Canmore Leader, Canmore, Alberta (merged to become the Bow Valley Crag & Canyon in 2013)
- Banff Crag & Canyon, Banff, Alberta (merged to become the Bow Valley Crag & Canyon in 2013)
- The Beausejour Review, Beausejour, Manitoba
- The Lac du Bonnet Leader, Lac du Bonnet, Manitoba
- The Lindsay Daily Post, Lindsay, Ontario
- Midland Free Press, Midland, Ontario
- L'Action Régionale Montérégie, Montérégie, Québec
- Le Magazine Saint-Lambert, Saint-Lambert, Quebec
- Le Progrès de Bellechasse, Bellechasse, Quebec
- The Meadow Lake Progress, Meadow Lake, Saskatchewan
- The Crowsnest Pass Promoter, Crowsnest Pass, Alberta
- CKXT-DT - closed 2011
- Sun News Network

=== Sold ===
- Houston Post, Houston, Texas (acquired in 1983, sold in 1987)
- The Hamilton Spectator, Hamilton, Ontario (acquired 1998, sold in 1999)
- Kitchener-Waterloo Record, Kitchener, Ontario (acquired 1998, sold in 1999)
- Guelph Mercury, Guelph, Ontario (acquired 1998, sold in 1999)
- Cambridge Reporter, Cambridge, Ontario (acquired 1998, sold in 1999)
- CP24 - 29.9% interest sold to CHUM Limited in 2004. Now owned by Bell Media.
- United Press Canada - 80% interest purchased in 1979 from United Press International, sold to Canadian Press in 1985
