= Osprey Media =

Former Canadian newspaper chain

Osprey Media L.P. was a Canadian newspaper regional chain that published 20 daily newspapers, 34 non-daily newspapers, and a number of shopping guides and magazines in the Canadian province of Ontario. Formerly an independent income trust, Osprey was taken over by Quebecor's Sun Media division in 2007. With the sale of Sun Media to Postmedia Network a decade later, many of its former newspapers owned by Osprey today are either owned by Postmedia or Torstar.

In September 2006, the last annual release of Canadian circulation figures before the company's takeover by Quebecor, Osprey Media's dailies had average daily paid and unpaid circulation / distribution of approximately 340,000 copies, while its non-daily newspapers had average weekly paid and unpaid circulation / distribution of approximately 466,000 copies.

== History ==
Osprey Media Group was created in 2001, when Michael Sifton, heir to the family that had once owned the Regina Leader-Post and the Saskatoon Star-Phoenix, purchased many of the Ontario newspapers that had been put on the market by Conrad Black's Hollinger newspaper group. As a newly incorporated media group, Osprey Media's purchase marked the first time in many years that a major newspaper sale significantly increased the diversity of newspaper ownership in Canada.

In April 2004, Osprey Media Group, motivated by tax breaks, became a subsidiary of Osprey Media Income Fund (OMIF), a unit trust. They changed their name to Osprey Media LP in January 2006 after receiving Canada Revenue Agency approval of their reorganization plans.

On May 31, 2007, it was announced that OMIF would be acquired by Quebecor Media Group for C$517 million. The announcement noted that Scotia Merchant Capital and the Ontario Teachers' Pension Plan had conditionally agreed to tender units in their control which amount to over 50% of the outstanding units. According to Editor & Publisher, the sale of OMIF was at least in part motivated by the pending loss of the tax advantages which had earlier led to the creation of the unit trust.

On June 27, 2007, a competing takeover offer from Black Press was also announced. On July 6, 2007, OMIF accepted a revised offer from Quebecor of C$575.8 million.

A decade after Osprey Media's demise, Sun Media was acquired by Postmedia in 2015 after Quebecor divested of its English newspapers. Postmedia re-sold many of the former Osprey newspapers to rival Torstar in 2017 in an asset swap with some newspapers closed operation.

== Publications ==
=== Weekly newspapers ===
- Bancroft This Week
- Barry's Bay This Week
- Colborne Chronicle
- Collingwood Enterprise Bulletin
- Community Press - Eastern Edition
- Community Press - Quinte Edition
- Community Press - Western Edition
- Dresden North Kent Leader
- Dunnville Chronicle
- Elliot Lake Standard
- Fort Erie Times
- Gananoque Reporter
- Haldimand Review
- Haliburton County Echo
- InPort News
- Kingston This Week
- Lindsay Post (twice a week)
- Markdale Standard
- Midland Free Press
- Mid-North Monitor (Espanola)
- Minden Times
- Napanee Guide
- Nepean This Week
- Niagara Advance
- Niagara News - Niagara Falls Edition
- Niagara News - St. Catharines Edition
- Niagara News - Thorold Edition
- Niagara News - Welland Edition
- Pelham News
- The News (Pembroke, Petawawa & area)
- Petrolia Topic
- Picton County Weekly News
- Sault Ste. Marie This Week
- The Post
- Timmins Times
- Trenton Trentonian
- Wallaceburg Community News
- West Lincoln Review

=== Daily newspapers ===
- Barrie Examiner
- Belleville Intelligencer
- Brantford Expositor
- Brockville Recorder and Times
- Chatham Daily News
- Cobourg Daily Star
- Cornwall Standard Freeholder
- Kingston Whig-Standard
- Niagara Falls Review
- North Bay Nugget
- Orillia Packet and Times
- Owen Sound Sun Times
- Pembroke Daily Observer
- Peterborough Examiner
- Port Hope Evening Guide
- Sarnia Observer
- Sault Star
- St. Catharines Standard
- Sudbury Star
- Timmins Daily Press
- Welland Tribune

=== Other publications ===
- Northern News (published three times weekly)
- Cornwall Smart Shopper
- Fort Erie Shopping Times
- Key to Kingston
- Muskoka Magazine (published ten times a year)
- Niagara Shopping News
- Tilbury Marketplace
