= The Sault Star =

Canadian newspaper in Ontario

- Front page of the May 30, 2020 edition
- Type: Daily newspaper
- Format: Broadsheet
- Owner: Postmedia
- Founder(s): James W. Curran and John Edward Gardiner Curran
- Publisher: Postmedia
- Editor: Jeffery Ougler, District Editor
- Founded: August 1, 1901 as The Sault Weekly Star; March 16, 1912; 114 years ago as The Sault Daily Star
- Language: English
- Headquarters: 365 Bloor St. E Toronto, Ontario; M4W 3L4
- Country: Canada
- Circulation: 7,850 weekdays 8,469 Saturdays (as of 2015)
- ISSN: 0839-203X
- OCLC number: 18242726
- Website: www.saultstar.com

The Sault Star is a Canadian broadsheet daily newspaper based in Sault Ste. Marie, Ontario. It is owned by Postmedia.

The print edition of Star publishes on Tuesdays, Thursdays and Saturdays and is delivered within the Sault Ste. Marie area and Algoma District.

Regular daily news coverage is provided through the paper's website.

In 2015 - the last year that Newspapers Canada reported on circulation data - the paper had a daily paid circulation of 7,577 weekdays and 7,763 on Saturdays. Its total circulation including print and digital was 7,850 on weekdays and 8,469 on Saturdays.

== History ==
=== The Curran family era ===
The Sault Star was founded in 1901 by two brothers, John Edward Gardiner (Jack) Curran and James W. Curran who purchased the Sault Courier, which had begun publishing around 1895, from lawyer Moses McFadden and his brother Uriah. James Curran had already established a career in the newspaper industry when he arrived in the city in July 1901, having been city editor of the Toronto Empire and news editor of the Montreal Herald.

The Currans published the first edition of a weekly paper, The Sault Weekly Star, on August 31, 1901, from a small frame building on East Street in the city's downtown using a hand-operated flat-bed printing press that had earlier printed one of Winnipeg's first newspapers. The weekly was published and distributed on Thursdays.

The first edition of the Sault Daily Star was published on March 16, 1912, and sold for two cents a copy with a total circulation of fewer than 2,000. The new paper promised readers more current news than they might read in Toronto-based papers delivered by rail. Relying on a special wire run and operated by the CPR Telegraph Company, the Currans boasted that "The Sault Daily Star will give the news just one day ahead of the Toronto papers. It will print Monday's news on Monday and deliver the paper to all of Algoma on Monday."

Among the first stories covered by the new daily in 1912 was the news that Sault Ste. Marie would be incorporated as a city later that year.

In 1905, James Curran replaced the second-hand equipment with new modern presses of the day and moved the-then The Sault Weekly Star to a two-story building at 374 Queen Street East in the city's downtown. That location was expanded three times to meet larger circulation of the weekly paper and the daily that followed.

The Star signed a collective agreement with staff in its composing room during this period. The first contract with Local 746 of the International Typographical Union representing 12 employees in May 1941 secured these workers a weekly wage of $34. Over the years, this bargaining unit would expand, starting with photoengraving staff and later adding newsroom, library, circulation and mailing staff. This union would eventually become Local 746 of the Communications Workers of America.

In 1951, the much larger staff operation of the Sault Daily Star moved across the street to a new two and a half story building designed by Toronto architects Mathers and Haldenby and custom built for the Star at 369 Queen Street East. Construction of another two floors was completed in 1958 to house executive offices, a new larger newsroom and photo department as well as an elevator.

The Star invested in technology to modernize and improve how the paper was produced. In March 1952 the paper created its own photo department built around a darkroom for photo developing and photo engraving machine to allow local news photos to be printed in that day's paper. The paper also subscribed to Canadian Press' news photo service. In September of that year it became one of 27 papers using a typesetter system to convert Canadian Press wire stories into type set for print in the day's paper.

James W. Curran remained the paper's publisher and owner until 1941. That year his eldest son Robert L. Curran became publisher, with his son John A. Curran as managing editor, and daughter Nan Rajnovich as women's page editor.

=== Southam Press ===
After 74 years and three generations of family ownership, in April 1975 Robert Curran, announced the sale of the paper to Southam Press, one of the Canada's largest publicly owned newspaper publishing companies. At the time the Toronto-based Southam owned 13 other dailies, trade magazines and other holdings. Not disclosed at the time, the value of the sale was an estimated $3.4 million.

While news and editorial policies would be set by the new owner, Southam reassured staff and readers the paper would otherwise continue to operate as it had. Southam's president emphasized that decisions about the content of the paper, pricing and staffing would continue to be made locally.

The sale gave the Star access to Southam's bureaus in Ottawa, Toronto, Washington, London, Paris and Peking, as well as to the Financial Times news service. Employees were assured of future opportunities and job security as result.

The sale ended the Star's boast of being the largest independently owned daily in Northern Ontario. At the time of sale, the Star had 180 employees and a circulation of over 23,000.

Shortly after, Bill Dane became the paper's first publisher under Southam's ownership with the retirement of Robert Curran in mid-May 1975. Formerly publisher of the Owen Sound Sun Times, Dane was tapped for his experience having taken that paper under group ownership in 1969.

Among his first decisions, the new publisher dropped "Daily" from the paper's name that year. Other content changes included a new monthly business section, a Friday TV listing and a colour comics section on Saturdays.

Southam's ownership provided capital to modernize and invest in new technology. In February 1979, the paper moved from its Queen Street location to a new 30,000 square foot, $1.4 million facility at 145 Old Garden River Road in the city's north-east. At the same time, the paper moved from letter press to offset printing.

Under Southam, the decision was made to close the commercial printing business that had been operated alongside by the paper. This operation was shuttered in November 1980 with the loss of 12 full-time jobs.

After 12 years in the role, Dane retired as publisher in 1987. Cliff Sharp, publisher of the North Bay Nugget and former Sault Star advertising manager took on the role for less than two years. He was replaced by Southam executive E. Paul Wilson in August 1988.

=== 1992 labour disruption ===
On the afternoon of June 19, 1992, newsroom, photography, advertising, composing, circulation and mail employees set up a picket line in front of the Sault Star building. The 65 members of the Communications Workers of America, Local 746 had been without a contract for nine months and were at loggerheads with management. Issues centred around compensation and job security at a time when Canada's newspapers, fighting television for advertisers and audiences, saw payroll reductions as the path to profitability.

What followed was a 12-week labour disruption. The Star continued to publish during this period, relying on management, non-unionized part-time employees and replacement workers. The unusual decision to bring in 11 replacement workers from other Southam papers was controversial and provocative, and contributed to lasting tensions between management and unionized workers at the paper.

The dispute ended when the union agreed to a new three-year contract that offered modest wage increases and promised no layoffs for nine months. At the time, total employment at the paper was approximately 135 staff: 65 newsroom staff belonging to CWA Local 746; nine pressmen belonging to the Graphic Communications International Union, Local 436C; and 60 management and non-unionized employees.

In July 1992, a month into the dispute, Southam announced that Montreal Gazette general manager Bob Richardson would replace Wilson as publisher.

=== Hollinger Incorporated ===
In November 1992, Hollinger Incorporated, a Toronto-based media company owned by financier Conrad Black purchased a 23 per cent stake in Southam. The surprise move made Hollinger the largest single shareholder of the company. While Hollinger give official lip service to the autonomy of local papers, Black began pursuing a program of “de-manning” to reduce Southam's payroll by $40 million annually.

In April 1996, Black's intended staff cuts came to the Star newsroom. Facing the possibility of reduced hours or layoff, eight Star employees accepted early retirement packages. At the time, publisher Richardson indicated that layoffs could come if advertising revenues did not improve and that the Star was also considering cancelling its membership in the Canadian Press wire service as a potential cost reduction.

In May 1996, Hollinger acquired a controlling stake in Southam, becoming Canada's largest newspaper owner controlling 58 dailies, including The Sault Star. Describing Southam's papers a “mediocre product,” Hollinger moved quickly to cut costs and influence content in a more conservative direction to end what Black called an “overwhelming avalanche of soft, left, bland, envious pap which has poured like sludge through the centre pages of Southam papers for some time.”

In late April 1999, The Star's print masthead was changed from “A division of Southam Inc.” to “A division of Hollinger Canadian Newspapers L.P.” However, almost a year later, in a surprise move intended to boost its stock price and reduce over $2 billion in debt, Hollinger put The Sault Star and 50 of its other papers up for sale.

=== Osprey Media Group & Quebecor Media ===
In August 2002, facing bankruptcy Hollinger sold The Sault Star and 28 other Ontario-based community papers to the newly formed Osprey Media for $220 million. Osprey was headed by Michael Sifton, who had formerly run the division of Hollinger responsible for the Star and other small papers. The new owners stressed that local control would remain over news operations.

In June 2007, Quebecor Media, owners of the Sun Media tabloid chain purchased Osprey, including the Star and 53 other Canadian papers for $517 million.

Ownership by Quebecor/Sun Media resulted in continued job cuts and production changes at the Star. In December 2008, Sun Media cut three newsroom jobs, two advertising jobs and one part time office job at the paper as part of a corporate goal to eliminate 10 per cent of the chain's overall workforce.

Calling it "a necessary step for us to reduce our labour and capital expenses to help offset the dramatic declines in advertising revenues we are experiencing as a result of the economic downturn," in April 2009, the publisher moved pre-press production to a non-unionized facility in Barrie which was handling similar duties for other Sun Media papers. This decision resulted in the loss of three full time graphics and layout jobs at the paper.

In May 2014, Sun Media announced that printing of the Sault Star would be moved to the facilities of the North Bay Nugget, resulting in the loss of 23 jobs in the press and mailing room. Print copies of the paper would now be produced 440 km to the east and delivered daily to retailers and subscribers. The local city council reacted critically to the job cuts calling on “Sun Media [to] reconsider its plan to cut jobs in Sault Ste. Marie and consider the impact of their decisions on local news services.”

=== Postmedia ===
In 2015, Postmedia acquired Sun Media from Quebecor, including the Star and its other papers.

As part of its strategy to raise capital across its newspaper holdings by divesting of assets and real estate, in May 2017, Postmedia sold the Star's headquarters at 145 Old Garden River Road to DiTommaso Investments for an undisclosed sum. The Star's presses, which had sat idle since print production was moved in 2014, were removed from the Star's headquarters in June 2017.

The Star's 18 employees continued to operate from a leased portion of the building until November 2020, at which point Postmedia vacated the building entirely, with staff working remotely on a permanent basis.

In 2018, the publisher announced that the Star would cease publishing a Monday print edition. In June 2022, citing the "changing media landscape in North America and our own digital transformation" the Star's publisher announced that the print edition would only be published on Tuesday, Thursday and Saturday, meaning there would be no print edition or digital e-edition on Mondays, Wednesdays and Fridays.

In early 2023, Postmedia announced the elimination of all advertising sales staff at the Sault Star as part of its plan to cut 120 sales positions across its chain.

As of 2023, Postmedia employs five staff at the Sault Star: four multimedia journalists working remotely and reporting to editors in Sudbury, and one position responsible for reader sales and circulation.

Ending 125 years as a print publication, first as a weekly and then as a daily, on September 29, 2026, Postmedia announced that The Sault Star would cease printing and move to an entirely digital format effective at the end of October. The closure of its printing facilities in North Bay ended the print runs for six Northern Ontario papers, including The North Bay Nugget, The Sudbury Star, The Timmins Daily Press, The Elliot Lake Standard and Espanola's Mid-North Monitor.

== Social and cultural relevance ==
Purchased for its launch as a daily in 1912, the Star was the first newspaper in Ontario to use a No. 8 (three magazine) linotype machine.

An article in the November 1, 1917 issue of The Sault Daily Star about Halloween celebrations in the city is considered the first use of the term "tricks or treats” in print. The term appeared in the Star ten years earlier than the 1927 example the Oxford English Dictionary cites as its earliest use.

The Star's founding publisher J. W. Curran created notoriety for himself and the Star with a February 14, 1925 editorial boasting that "the Sault Daily Star will pay $100 to the first person who can establish to the satisfaction of the editor that any timber or 'brush' wolf has attacked any person in Algoma.” Curran believed the animals harmless and sought to dispel storied myths of wolves attacking people. The challenge gathered attention from across North America, including a 1993 inquiry from Ripley's Believe It or Not!, and attracted over 300 claims, but never one that The Star paid out.

The result of a conversation he had with the publisher of Sault Evening News of Sault Ste. Marie, Michigan, President John F. Kennedy sent a telegram that was read at a celebration of the Star's 50th anniversary on March 16, 1962, which read:

Your American colleague George Osborn, who is lunching with me today, has told me of your 50th anniversary celebration tonight and your great efforts in promoting better relations between Canada and the United States. I would like to join in congratulating you on this historic date.

== The Sault Star wolf ==
The Sault Star's masthead has featured a howling wolf for much of its history.

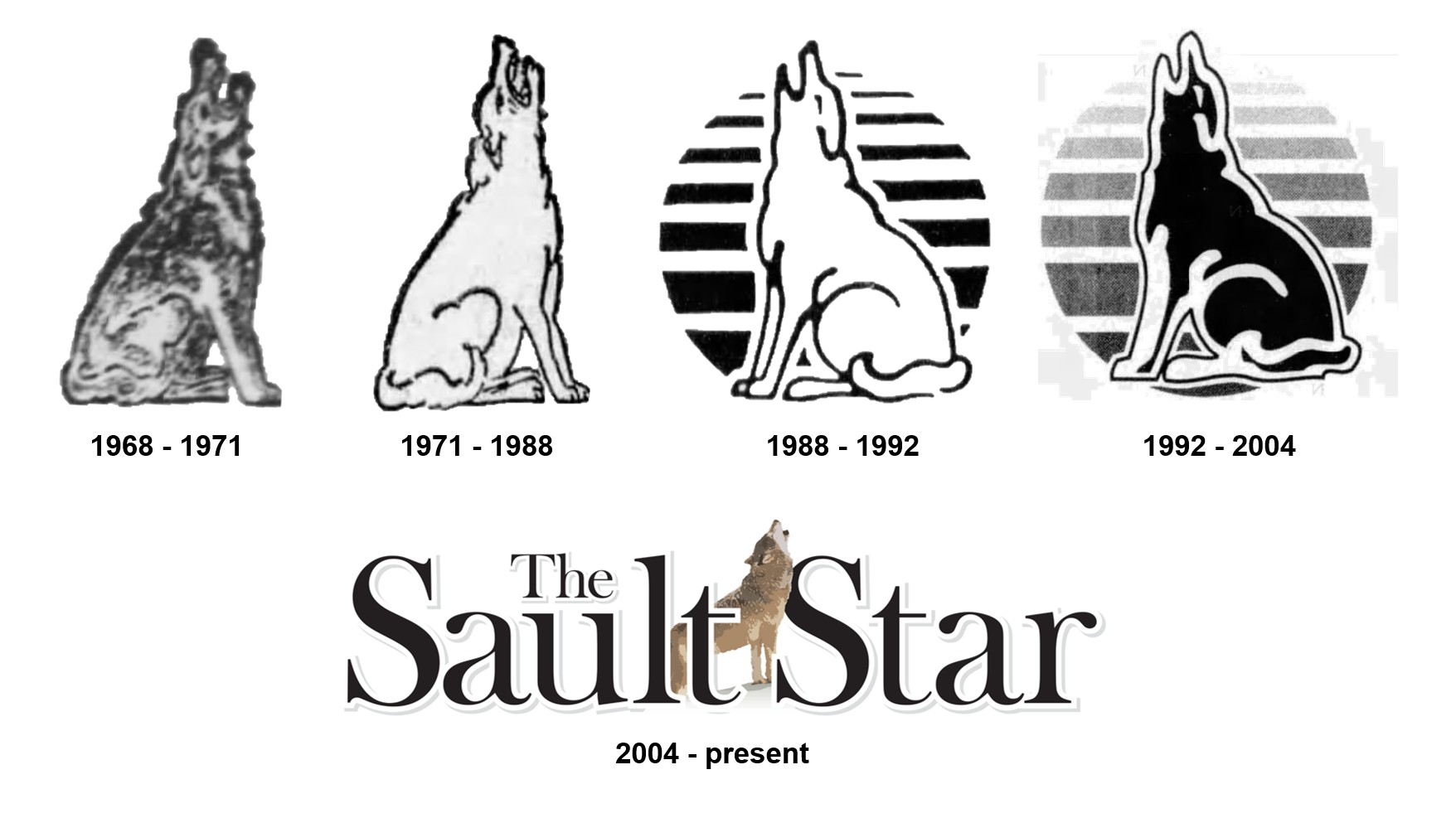
The Sault Star howling wolf logo from 1968 to present

The paper's association with the wolf began with the Star's founding publisher. The animals that were prevalent in the Algoma District held a fascination for J. W. Curran and he used them as a way to promote the city and region.

The original howling wolf logo was illustrated by John Arthur Luxton and first appeared as part of the paper's masthead beginning in 1968. The logo would be modified and stylized in 1971, 1988 and 1992 before being replaced by a photo illustration of a howling wolf in 2004.

In 1987, the wolf logo was removed as part of a redesign. This decision was met with letters from disappointed readers and was reversed two weeks later.

== Achievements and awards ==
In 1986, Star reporter Karen Lewis won a Canadian Science Writers Association award for a piece on efforts to control invasive sea lamprey in the Great Lakes.

Features reporter Alisa Priddle won a 1987 provincial journalism award for a piece on the marginalization of lesbians in the Sault that appeared in the Star's “Starlight” weekend magazine.

Joe Warmington received a 1988 award from the Thunder Bay Press Club for his investigative series on the failure of local hospitals to meet provincial regulatory standards in their incineration practices.

Reporter Patti Murphy received the Ontario Newspaper Association's 1996 award for family section features writing for a piece on Sault families who had adopted children from China.

In 1988, Mary Jo Laforest received two Northern Ontario Journalism Awards, one for an investigative piece on drug addiction among teens, and a spot reporting award for her coverage of the murder of a student at Korah Collegiate. This same series of stories won Laforest and three other Star reporters a provincial news award for spot journalism.

In 2006 Star reporter Frank Dobrovnik received an award for excellence in health care reporting from the Registered Nurses’ Association of Canada. Reporter Jeffery Ougler received the same award in 2003.

Columnist Tom Mills has been a frequent nominee for the Ontario Newspaper Awards’ award for humour writing, winning in 2008 and 2012.

In 2012 and 2013, Sherri Lavigne received the ONA's award for layout and design for papers with circulation under 25,000.

== Notable staff ==
=== Publishers ===
- James Watson Curran (1901–1952)

=== Journalists and columnists ===
- Bob MacKenzie, sports writer (1979–1981)
- Russ Ramsay, local sports and history columnist (1990–1999)
- Morley Torgov, Scouts columnist (1941–1942); staff writer (1943)
- Brian Vallée, staff writer (1962–1970)

== See also ==
- The Evening News – newspaper for Sault Ste. Marie, Michigan
- List of newspapers in Canada
