= The London Free Press =

Daily newspaper in Ontario, Canada

- July 4, 2008 front page
- Type: Daily newspaper
- Format: Broadsheet
- Owner: Postmedia Network
- Publisher: Susan Muszak
- Editor-in-chief: Greg Van Moorsel
- Founded: January 2, 1849; 177 years ago
- Headquarters: 210 Dundas Street; Suite 201; London, Ontario; N6A 5J3
- Circulation: 59,841 weekdays 63,348 Saturdays (as of 2015)
- ISSN: 0839-0738
- Website: lfpress.com

The London Free Press is a daily newspaper based in London, Ontario, Canada. It has the largest circulation of any newspaper in Southwestern Ontario.

== History ==
The London Free Press began as the Canadian Free Press, founded by William Sutherland. It first began printing as a weekly newspaper on January 2, 1849. In 1852, it was purchased for $500 by Josiah Blackburn (and Stephen Blackburn), who renamed it The London Free Press and Daily Western Advertiser. In 1855 Blackburn turned the weekly newspaper into a daily.

From 1863 to 1936 The London Free Press competed for readership with the London Advertiser, which was a daily evening newspaper. The Free Press has usually been a morning paper, but for many years, it also published an evening paper. Both morning and evening editions were published from the 1950s through to 1981, when the evening edition was permanently retired.

The Blackburn family was also involved in other forms of media in London. They established CFPL in 1933, CFPL-FM in 1948 and CFPL-TV in 1953. The radio stations are now owned by Corus Entertainment, and the television station is owned by Bell Media as a CTV 2 station.

The sudden death of publisher Martha Blackburn in the summer of 1992, due to a heart attack after water skiing on Lake Huron, set the stage for the eventual sale of the family owned newspaper. In 1997 the Blackburn family sold the newspaper to Sun Media Corporation, with new, London-born publisher John Paton introducing a Sunday edition. Later the same year, Sun Media was acquired by Quebecor Inc.

In late August 2005, Quebecor announced that, starting in 2007, The London Free Press would no longer be printed locally at its press at 369 York Street; instead it would be printed at a new press facility to be built north of Toronto, resulting in a loss of 180 local jobs. However, in September 2007, the move was suspended to allow the Free Press to present a business case for the printing department and staff's retention. The Free Press had one of the few printing presses in southern Ontario and it printed several papers for Sun Media newspapers in the area, including the Chatham Daily News, the Sarnia Observer, the Simcoe Reformer, the St. Thomas Times-Journal, the Stratford Beacon Herald, the Woodstock Sentinel-Review and the Londoner, along with the Free Press. In 2015, Sun Media was acquired by Postmedia. On May 31, 2016, Sun Media announced that they would outsource the printing of the Free Press to Metroland Media Group's printing facility in Hamilton. The printing facility in London was subsequently shut down and demolished.

== Circulation ==
The London Free Press has, like most Canadian daily newspapers, seen a decline in circulation. Its total circulation dropped by 10 percent to 60,426 copies daily from 2009 to 2015.

Daily average

== Notable former staff ==
- Victoria Grace Blackburn (1865–1928)
- Bob Ferguson (1931–2014), sports journalist and writer
- Morley Safer (1931–2016)
- Merle Tingley (1921–2017), the newspaper's main editorial cartoonist from 1948 to 1986

== See also ==
- List of newspapers in Canada
