= Impact of the COVID-19 pandemic on journalism =

Consequences of COVID-19 outbreak for media and publishing

The COVID-19 pandemic has strongly impacted the journalism industry and affected journalists' work. Many local newspapers have been severely affected by losses in advertising revenues from COVID-19; journalists have been laid off, and some publications have folded. Many newspapers with paywalls lowered them for some or all of their COVID-19 coverage. The pandemic was characterized as a potential "extinction event" for journalism as hundreds of news outlets closed and journalists were laid off around the world, advertising budgets were slashed, and many were forced to rethink how to do their jobs amid restrictions on movement and limited access to information or public officials. Journalists and media organizations have had to address new challenges, including figuring out how to do their jobs safely and how to navigate increased repression and censorship brought on by the response to the pandemic, with freelancers facing additional difficulties in countries where press cards or official designations limit who can be considered a journalist.

Journalists have worked to produce coverage of the pandemic combating misinformation, providing public health updates, and supplying entertainment to help people cope with the virus's impact. The long duration of the pandemic may have resulted in a COVID-19 information fatigue that could pose a challenge for journalists.

== Censorship ==
In some countries – including Turkey, Egypt, India, Bangladesh, Iraq, Iran, Nigeria, Ethiopia, Kenya, Tanzania, Uganda, Madagascar, Zambia, Cote d’Ivoire, Zimbabwe, Eswatini, Venezuela, Belarus, Montenegro, Kosovo, Kazakhstan, Azerbaijan, Malaysia, Singapore, Philippines, and Somalia – journalists have been threatened or arrested for their coverage of the COVID-19 pandemic.

Jordanian authorities arrested Roya TV channel's owner, Fares Sayegh, and its news director, Mohamad al-Khalidi, for reporting on lack of jobs and money needed by labourers to feed families during the curfew in mid-April.

On March 16, Romanian President Klaus Iohannis signed an emergency decree, giving authorities the power to remove, report or close websites spreading "fake news" about the COVID-19 pandemic, with no opportunity to appeal.

Myanmar blocked access to 221 news websites, including several leading media outlets.

In China Caixin has had a number of articles about the source and research COVID-19 pandemic removed from their website after publication.

In Madagascar, a journalist was arrested and charged with spreading fake news and incitement of hatred towards President Andry Rajoelina after she criticized the president's handling of the pandemic.

On May 5, Philippines' National Telecommunications Commission (NTC) issued a cease and desist order against the operations of, ABS-CBN TV network, forcing it to suspend operations for all of its physical broadcasting channels. There are allegations that the NTC refusal over the renewal of the franchise was based on the network's critical news coverage of President Rodrigo Duterte's administration. ABS-CBN said: "Millions of Filipinos will lose their source of news and entertainment when ABS-CBN is ordered to go off-air on TV and radio tonight... People need crucial and timely information as the nation deals with the COVID-19 pandemic."

On June 16, Egyptian journalist and editor-in-chief of the al-Diyar newspaper was detained and charged with spreading false news, joining a "terrorist organization" and misusing social media after he criticized his country's handling of the pandemic.

== Australia ==
BuzzFeed announced it was ending its news operations in Australia, as well as in the UK, partly due to a slump in advertising revenue due to the pandemic. The news outlet furloughed its four Australia news staff in the cutback.

== Canada ==
In Canada, a number of permanent layoffs and the closure of newspapers have been attributed to the pandemic.

In Atlantic Canada, production was suspended on all weekly publications owned by SaltWire Network, for a 3-month period. Only its four dailies (The Chronicle Herald, Cape Breton Post, The Guardian, and The Telegram) were kept in production. Halifax alternative weekly The Coast also laid off staff.

Postmedia ended the publication of the Manitoba newspapers Altona Red River Valley Echo, Carman Valley Leader, Gimli's Interlake Spectator, Morden Times, Selkirk Journal, Stonewall Argus & Teulon Times, Winkler Times, and The Prairie Farmer. In Ontario, they closed the newspapers Kingsville Reporter, Windsor-Essex's Lakeshore News, LaSalle Post, Tecumseh Shoreline Week, and Tilbury Times. Further, The Napanee Guide and Paris Star have ceased their print editions, and are now online-only.

Torstar brand Metroland Media has ceased the print editions of the Beach-East York Neighbourhood Voice, Bloor West-Parkdale Neighbourhood Voice, and York-City Centre Neighbourhood Voice newspapers. The Bolton offices of The Caledon Enterprise were closed, with staff moving into the Brampton Guardian and Mississauga News shared newsroom in Mississauga.

In Quebec, CN2i reduced their six daily newspapers to Saturday editions as of March. The move resulted in 143 temporary layoffs.

Sing Tao Daily Toronto, owned by Torstar, ended its weekly free print edition. Canadian Jewish News is closed its operations after 60 years. Winnipeg's The Jewish News and Post, established in 1925, became an online-only publication.

== Hong Kong ==
The South China Morning Post announced on April 22, 2020, that it would introduce a package of cost-cutting and revenue-raising measures intended to weather the economic impact of the coronavirus pandemic. Twenty-seven senior executives had immediate pay cuts, higher paid staff were asked to take three weeks unpaid leave, salaries were frozen, and a limited number of redundancies were made. From August 2020 the newspaper announced it was bringing back its paywall to try to make up the revenue shortfall due to loss of advertising during the pandemic.

== India ==
As of May 4, 2020, almost 100 journalists had tested positive for COVID-19 in India. Fifteen employees of the Jai Maharashtra news network had the virus, as did nineteen employees of the Punjab Kesari newspaper. Media watchers reported jobs losses, pay cuts, and shutting down of editions in various places in India.

== United Kingdom ==
Many media organisations have reported slumps in advertising revenue as a result of the COVID-19 pandemic. The Secretary of State for Digital, Culture, Media and Sport, Oliver Dowden, said the pandemic had caused the "biggest existential crisis" in the history of the press, as local and national newspapers experienced circulation decline.

On March 20, 2020, the London business newspaper City A.M. suspended its print edition and announced it would halve its staff pay in April.

Independent Digital News and Media, the owner of The Independent and indy100 news websites, furloughed some of its staff and cut wages for employees.

BuzzFeed announced it was ending its news operations in the UK, as well as in Australia, partly due to a slump in advertising revenue due to the pandemic. Its ten news staff in the UK were furloughed in the cutback.

The newspaper group Reach plc, which owns titles including the Daily Mirror and Daily Express, reported a 30% fall in its revenues for April 2020. In July 2020 it announced that due to falling income it would cut 550 jobs.

By May 2020, 50 local newspapers had stopped appearing in print. Meanwhile, digital subscriptions to The Times newspaper significantly increased, according to its editor John Witherow. Amid the pandemic, the Daily Mail overtook The Sun as the largest-selling newspaper in the UK in May 2020.

In July 2020, The Guardian announced it would cut 180 jobs. Figures at the newspaper said that revenues would be £25 million less than the year's budget.

== United States ==
The scale of the COVID-19 outbreak has prompted several major publishers to temporarily disable their paywalls on related articles, including Bloomberg News, The Atlantic, The New York Times, The Wall Street Journal, and The Seattle Times. Many local newspapers were already severely struggling before the crisis. Several alt weekly newspapers in affected metropolitan areas, including The Stranger in Seattle and Austin Chronicle, have announced layoffs and funding drives due to lost revenue. Advertisements concerning public events and venues accounted for a majority of revenue for alt-weekly newspapers, which was disrupted by the cancellation of large public gatherings. Online advertisements also dropped to avoid running ads next to COVID-19 coverage.

== See also ==
- COVID-19 misinformation
- Media coverage of the COVID-19 pandemic
