= Victoria Grace Blackburn =

Canadian journalist and author

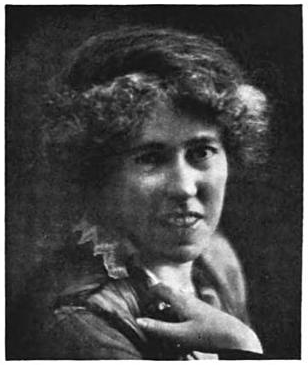
- Blackburn, in Canadian Poets (1916)
- Born: April 17, 1865; Quebec City
- Died: March 4, 1928 (aged 62)
- Education: Hellmuth Ladies' College
- Writing career
- Genres: Journalism, Poetry

Victoria Grace Blackburn (17 April 1865 – 4 March 1928) was a Canadian journalist and writer.

== Biography ==
Blackburn was born on April 17, 1865, in Quebec City. In 1894, after studying at Hellmuth Ladies' College, Blackburn began writing for the London Free Press. In 1890s she also worked as a teacher. The paper was published by her father, Josiah Blackburn, and, later, by her brother, Walter Josiah Blackburn. In 1900 she became the paper's literary and drama critic.

Blackburn studied criticism in New York and spent some years in Europe with her sisters. In 1918 she returned to Canada and became managing editor of the London Free Press. She stayed in that position for a decade and was an important figure among London's cultural elite.

Beyond her journalism, Blackburn published dozens of poems, two plays and a novel.

== Bibliography ==
- Blackburn, Grace (1918). "Grace Blackburn". In Garvin, John William (ed.). Canadian Poems of the Great War. Toronto: McClelland & Stewart. pp. 19–21.
