= William Buckingham (publisher) =

Canadian newspaper publisher

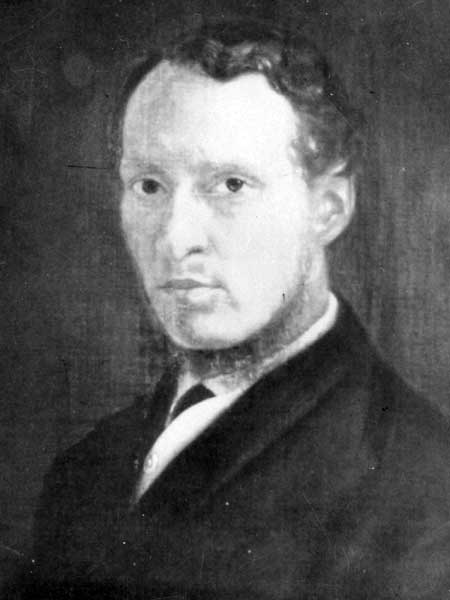
William Buckingham

William Buckingham (December 3, 1832 – June 11, 1915) was a Canadian newspaper publisher, author and politician.

Buckingham was born in Crediton, Devonshire to Robert and Jane Buckingham. After completing his education and working as a shorthand writer in England, he came to Canada in 1857 and joined the parliamentary reporting staff of the Toronto Globe. In 1859, he travelled to Fort Garry at the Red River Colony (now Winnipeg) with a hand press brought from Toronto and established the Nor' Wester, the first newspaper published in the Canadian Prairies, with William Coldwell and James Ross. The first issue of the paper appeared on August 22, 1859. Although the paper was favourably received, it was not a financial success, prompting Buckingham to return east soon afterwards. The newspaper's operations continued until 1869, when it was seized by Louis Riel for its pro-Confederation advocacy. In 1861, Buckingham became the editor of the Simcoe Reformer and from 1863 to 1874 was editor of the Stratford Beacon. In 1866, he acted as the official reporter of the London Conference of 1866, which drafted The British North America Act, 1867.

In 1862, Buckingham was appointed private secretary to Michael Hamilton Foley. The following year, he married Martha Phelps of Mount Pleasant, Ontario; they had six children. He subsequently served as the private secretary of Alexander Mackenzie during his tenure as prime minister from 1873 to 1878, and was later appointed Deputy Minister of the Interior under David Mills on October 8, 1878. Following the federal election of 1878, John A. Macdonald assumed the role of Minister of the Interior and, preferring not to have his political rival's private secretary as his Deputy, suggested that Buckingham consent to a change in his position. Buckingham resigned his position soon afterwards, and declined an offer to become Inspector of Prisons and Public Charities of Ontario. Buckingham later served as reeve of Stratford, Ontario.

In 1892, Buckingham co-wrote The Honourable Alexander Mackenzie: His Life and Times with George William Ross, who became premier of Ontario in 1899. Buckingham was also the author of Recollections of Canadian Statesmen, and published an article on "George Brown and The Globe" for The Canadian Encyclopedia.

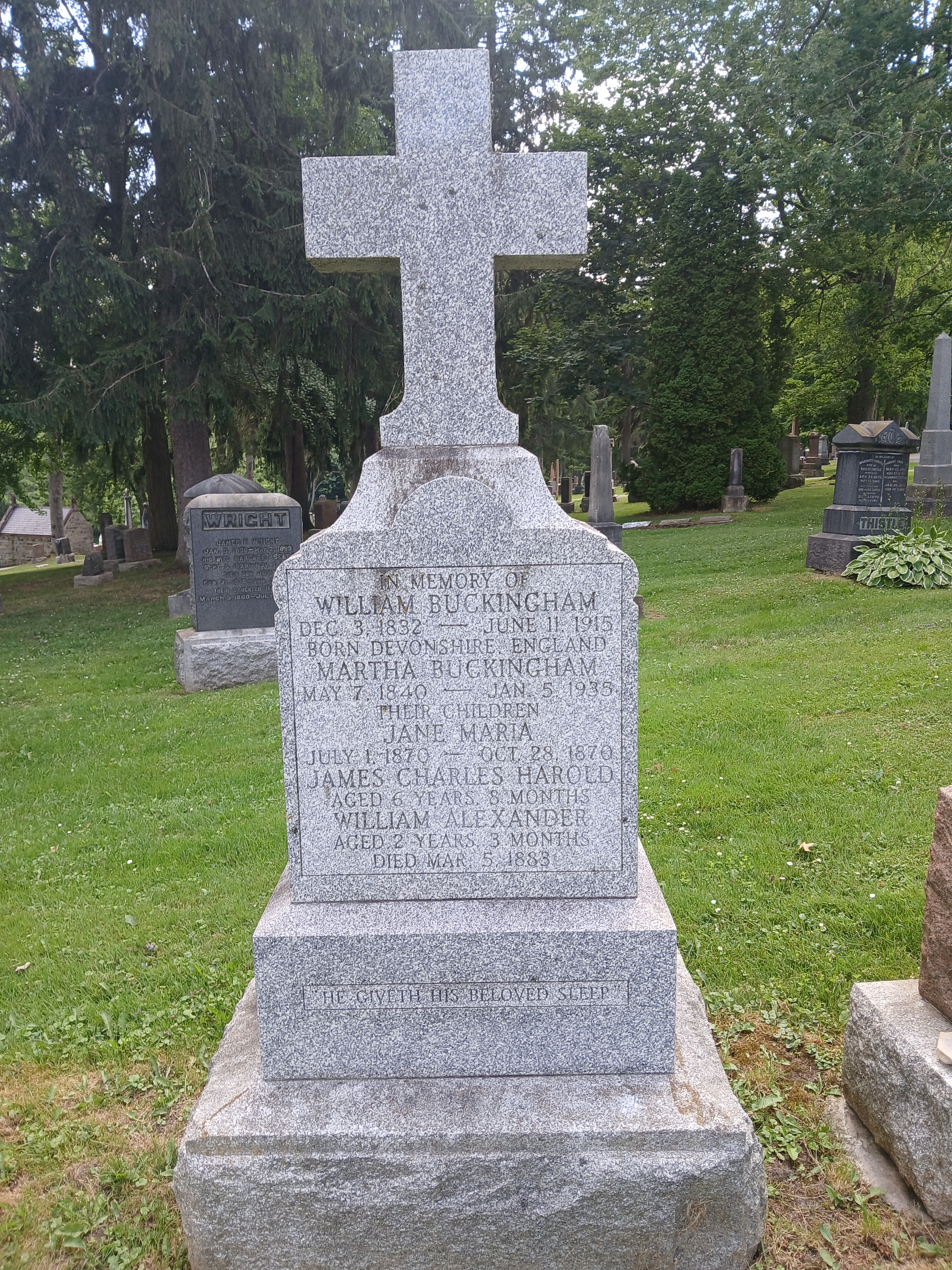
Located at the Avondale Cemetery in Strarford, Ontario.

Buckingham died at Stratford on June 11, 1915. He is buried in the Avondale Cemetery in Stratford. Buckingham Road in Winnipeg is named in his honour.
