= Lacombe Globe =

News publication in Lacombe, Alberta

- Type: Weekly newspaper
- Format: Broadsheet
- Owner(s): Postmedia
- Publisher: Nick Goetz
- Founded: 1902
- Ceased publication: 2020
- Headquarters: Lacombe, Alberta
- Circulation: 3,300
- Website: www.lacombeglobe.com

The Lacombe Globe was a local news publication for the Lacombe, Alberta area. Founded in 1902, the paper was one of many Alberta publications owned by Postmedia Network. On January 16, 2020, the newspaper ceased publication. At the time of its closing, it had been Lacombe's longest operating business.

== See also ==
- List of newspapers in Canada
