= Fort Saskatchewan Record =

Canadian local newspaper in Alberta

- Type: Weekly newspaper
- Owner(s): Postmedia
- Founded: 1922
- Language: English
- Headquarters: 168-10404 99 Ave. Fort Saskatchewan, Alberta; T8L 3W2
- Circulation: 9,689
- Website: fortsaskatchewanrecord.com

The Fort Saskatchewan Record is a once-weekly (Thursdays) free newspaper in Fort Saskatchewan, Alberta, Canada, a city on the northeast side of the Edmonton metropolitan area. It is the oldest paper in the city.

== History ==
The paper began publication on April 5, 1922. H. Oxley was the first publisher. Owner Jake Ootes sold the paper to Bowes Publishing in 1983. In 1988, the Bowes chain was sold to Sun Media. Sun, as a subsidiary of Quebecor Media, continued to own the paper until 2015 when Sun Media was acquired by Postmedia.

In 2003, local paper "This Week", which Bowes had purchased in 1997, was merged into the Fort Record, and the paper started publishing twice weekly instead of only once. The paper returned to a once-weekly format in February 2009.

== See also ==
- List of newspapers in Canada
