= Midland Free Press =

The Midland Free Press was founded in 1896. In 1933, it was purchased by Herbert Cranston, longtime editor of the Toronto Star Weekly. Cranston published the newspaper until his death. His son sold it to Thomson Newspapers in 1965. Thomson published the paper on Wednesdays and Fridays, introducing a Sunday paper in 1992. The Sunday edition, which was circulated in several regional papers, was dropped in 1994, just before the paper was sold to Southam Newspapers. Southam, in turn, was absorbed by Hollinger, which sold the paper to Osprey Media. That company was later absorbed by Quebecor. Each owner stripped assets from the paper and cut staff. Its printing plant and downtown office were sold and its editorial staff was cut from six full-time reporters and editors to one part-time editor and one reporter. The newspaper has won numerous awards, especially during the Cranston years. Its reporters, including Paul Welch, Jacquie McLaghlan, Mark Bourrie, Debbie Levy and Susan Swan, who was a cub reporter for two summers in the 1960s, broke important environment, political and spot news stories in the 1980s and 1990s.

The Free Press published its last edition on Thursday June 20, 2013.

== See also ==
- List of newspapers in Canada
