= Woodstock Sentinel-Review =

Canadian daily newspaper in Ontario

Woodstock Sentinel Review

- Front page of the July 12, 2013 edition
- Type: Daily newspaper
- Format: Broadsheet
- Owner: Postmedia
- Editor: Bruce Urquhart
- Founded: Sept. 11, 1886
- Language: English
- Headquarters: 210 Dundas St. London, Ontario; N6A 5J3
- Website: www.woodstocksentinelreview.com

The Woodstock Sentinel-Review is a local daily newspaper that serves Woodstock, Ontario and Oxford County in the Canadian province of Ontario.

It's published four days a week, Tuesday to Friday, after the Monday print edition was ended November 19, 2018. The Sentinel-Review is owned by the Postmedia Network corporation. The newspaper is printed at The Hamilton Spectator, which prints several Postmedia Network newspapers, and is designed in Barrie, Ontario. The Sentinel-Review was formerly printed at The London Free Press for more than 10 years until their print production moved to Hamilton after Postmedia announced The London Free Press' printing press operations would be closed and outsourced to Hamilton. The Sentinel-Review's last London print date was Oct. 6, 2016 and their first printing out of Hamilton was Oct. 10, 2016. Content for The Oxford Review is provided from the Sentinel-Review and is delivered by mail every Thursday in Oxford County.

== History ==
In one form or another, The Sentinel-Review has been published since the 1850s and has gone by several names, including The Daily Sentinel-Review, The Weekly Sentinel-Review, The Woodstock Herald, The Woodstock Monarch, The Woodstock Times, The Woodstock Review, and The Woodstock Sentinel. Although having gone through different names over its lengthy history, it was originally two newspapers. The Woodstock Sentinel began on Jan. 1, 1854, while the Woodstock Review first appeared Oct. 1, 1870. The two papers would merge about 16 years later on Saturday, Sept. 11, 1886 with George Robson Pattullo serving as the first editor when it was a weekly and his brother, Andrew Pattullo, after it became a daily. The Sentinel-Review, which was formerly part of the Sun Media chain of newspapers that was a division of Quebecor Media, was purchased by Postmedia Network in October 2014 with the sale being approved Competition Bureau in March 2015. Archived editions of The Sentinel-Review, or one of its predecessors, starting from the 1850s to the present can be found online at the Woodstock Public Library and Oxford Historical Association.

== Readership ==
The Sentinel-Review is available throughout Oxford County, but primarily in Woodstock with newspapers also being available and delivered to Tavistock, Thamesford, Ingersoll, Beachville, Embro, Norwich, Innerkip, Burgessville, Tillsonburg, Plattsville and other communities in the Oxford County. In the 2000s The Sentinel-Review began publishing stories, photos and videos online on its website as a new avenue to reach readers in the changing era of journalism. From the time they began the crossover into the digital age, The Sentinel-Review has had a presence in multiple social media forums such as Twitter, Facebook, the Internet, live chats and other methods to further reach local, national and international readers. Since those early online days, they have maintained a constant digital presence with thousands of unique page views.

== Newsroom ==
The Sentinel-Review newsroom was based out of 16 Brock St. in Woodstock until late November, 2017 when the office was sold and the paper was left without a home. The Sentinel-Review continued to be without an office until it was moved into the London Free Press newsroom at 210 Dundas St. in London, Ontario as of April 29, 2019.

The Brock St. office also had The Ingersoll Times and The Norwich Gazette staffed in their building beginning in February. 2013. Both papers were weeklies and came out every Wednesday. In 2017, between The Sentinel Review, The Norwich Gazette and The Ingersoll Times there are two editors and five reporters, who cover news, sports, politics, health, court, education, agriculture and entertainment in Oxford County. As of 2019, there were two reporters. The Ingersoll Times and The Norwich Gazette were closed by Postmedia in June, 2018.

In recent years several former and current staff have been nominated and received multiple Ontario Newspaper Awards for journalism and photography, in addition to other journalism awards. There's also sales and advertisement representatives, warehouse workers and administration staff of about 20 full-time and part-time employees, including the seven people in editorial as of 2017. In 2019, there were about five.

The advertising manager is Curtis Armstrong and the managing editor is Bruce Urquhart, who also holds the same position with the Oxford Review and the daily newspaper The Stratford Beacon-Herald that's printed Monday to Saturday that serves the community of Stratford and surrounding areas in Perth County.

== Past owners, publishers, editors and notable reporters ==
Alexander Hay - 1854

- Hay helped start the weekly Woodstock Sentinel in 1854, but was bought out by co-partner and father-in-law John McWhinnie shortly after it began publication. He had previously worked for the Oxford Star.

John McWhinnie - 1854 to 1870

- McWhinnie started the weekly Woodstock Sentinel with his son-in-law, Alexander Hay, Jan. 1, 1854, but bought Hay out shortly after it began publication and brought in his son Robert McWhinnie. John McWhinnie was born in Scotland and had edited the British American from 1849 to 1853.

Robert McWhinnie - 1854 to 1870

- McWhinnie was brought in by his father John McWhinnie in 1854 after he had bought out his co-partner Alexander Hay. Robert McWhinnie was the published and handled some editing duties. The Woodstock Sentinel was four pages in length, published on Fridays and printed on a Hoe press, which was powered by a hand turned wheel.

Daniel Clark - 1870 to 1875

- Clark started the Woodstock Weekly Review with his brother-in-law in Oct. 1870 as a response to the creation of the Woodstock Sentinel. He retired from the paper in 1875 to become the superintendent of the Provincial Lunatic Asylum in Toronto.

F.J. Gissing - 1870 to 1877

- Gissing, along with his brother-in-law Daniel Clark, created the Woodstock Weekly Review in Oct. 1870. Both Clark and he previously worked together on the Princeton Review. When Clark left the paper in 1875, Gissing continued alone until he became partners with Robert Laidlaw and he was bought out after the Review and the Sentinel merged.

George Robson Pattullo - 1870 to 1880

- Pattullo bought the Woodstock Sentinel from Robert McWhinnie in Sept., 1870 and brought in his brother Andrew in 1875 with the Sentinel merging with the Woodstock Review in 1878. G.R. Pattullo was the first editor of the weekly Sentinel-Review and served as publisher along with Robert Laidlaw. He previously worked at the Paris Transcript and worked as the registrar for the County of Oxford after leaving the paper. He was also the chief Liberal organizer for Ontario starting in 1880.

Andrew Pattullo - 1875 to 1901

- Andrew Pattullo joined the paper with his brother when it was still the Woodstock Sentinel, a weekly paper. He continued when it merged with the Woodstock Review in 1878. Andrew stayed with the paper when his brother, George, left and remained until the Sentinel-Review Co. took sole control away from Andrew Pattullo. He was also elected as an MPP for North Oxford in 1886 and was president of the Canadian Press Association in 1890.

Robert A. Laidlaw - 1877 to 1880

- Laidlaw was the first publisher with George Robson Pattullo on the weekly Sentinel-Review in 1878. He was bought out by Andrew Pattullo in 1880.

William J. Taylor - 1901 to 1907

- Taylor was brought in from the Montreal Herald, where he was business manager.

John Markey - 1907 to 1927

- Markey was a former reporter in the 19th century before leaving to work at a Detroit newspaper. He returned to work at the Woodstock Express and eventual the Sentinel-Review.

M. McIntrye Hood - 1927 to 1929

- Hood had been with the Sentinel-Review since 1920 before becoming managing editor.

W.E. Elliott - 1929 to 1941

- Elliott was the managing editor for 12 years. He left the Sentinel-Review to work at the Toronto Telegram.

Bill Fitsell - late 1940s

- Wrote for the Sentinel-Review and later became a noted historian and founder of the Society for International Hockey Research

Morley Safer - 1951

- After dropping out of the University of Western Ontario in 1951 at 19 years old, Safer joined the Sentinel-Review earning $28 a week. Following a short stint at the Sentinel-Review, Safer joined the London Free Press and eventually worked for the Canadian Broadcast Corporation, the Toronto Telegram, Reuters and most notably, CBS' 60 Minutes covering major international events like the Suez Crisis, the building of the Berlin Wall and the Vietnam War.

== See also ==
- List of newspapers in Canada
