= Grande Prairie Daily Herald-Tribune =

Canadian daily newspaper in Alberta

- Type: Daily newspaper
- Format: Tabloid
- Owner: Postmedia Network
- Publisher: Sun Media
- Headquarters: 10604 100 Street; Grande Prairie, Alberta; T8V 2M5
- Circulation: 28,155
- ISSN: 0839-4873
- OCLC number: 456167808
- Website: dailyheraldtribune.com

The Grande Prairie Daily Herald-Tribune, or the Daily Herald-Tribune, is an online news website published in Grande Prairie, Alberta, Canada.

The media outlet is owned by Postmedia Network, and operated by its Sun Media Division, which also manages the daily Calgary Sun, Edmonton Sun and Fort McMurray Today and several weekly newspapers throughout Alberta.

The news website was originally a newspaper formed in 1913 as the Grand Prairie Herald. It merged with the Northern Tribune in 1939 to become the Herald-Tribune. It became a daily newspaper in 1964, when the name of the paper became the Daily Herald-Tribune.

The Grande Prairie Daily Herald-Tribune ceased publishing a print edition on May 1, 2021, and now operates as a daily news website.

The Grande Prairie Daily Herald-Tribune is currently owned by Postmedia Network Inc., which is one of Canada's largest media companies. The newspaper has a daily circulation of around 5,000 copies, and it serves the Grande Prairie and Peace River regions.

== See also ==
- List of newspapers in Canada
