= Drayton Valley Western Review =

Canadian newspaper in Alberta

- Type: Weekly newspaper
- Format: Tabloid (1965-2023); Digital (2023-present)
- Owner: Postmedia
- Founded: 1965
- Headquarters: Drayton Valley, Alberta
- Website: www.draytonvalleywesternreview.com

The Drayton Valley Western Review is a weekly newspaper serving the Drayton Valley, Alberta area in Canada. First published in 1965 by Leonard Hogarth succeeding an earlier short lived paper Drayton Valley Banner. In February 2023 the newspaper ceased printing and when to a digital only publishing model.

In collaboration between the Drayton Valley Museum and the University of Alberta Library has digititzed the majority of the newspapers archive from microfilm and made them available in their Peel's Prairie Provinces collection in the Internet Archive. More recent issues (2012-2023) are available through the newspaper’s own website, though these are typically formatted as web articles rather than scanned historical pages.

== See also ==
- List of newspapers in Canada
