= Northern News =

- Type: Weekly newspaper
- Format: Broadsheet
- Owner: Postmedia
- Publisher: Lisa Wilson
- Founded: 1922
- Language: English
- Website: northernnews.ca

The Northern News is a newspaper in Kirkland Lake, Ontario, Canada. It is owned and published by Postmedia.

== History ==
First published in 1922 as the Northern Daily News, it was downsized to fit the population in the readership on June 1, 2004. It had been a daily newspaper, but after downsizing only published three times a week.

On August 28, 2012, the online version of Northern News was revamped to include more current events at the local, regional and national level.

On June 26, 2018, owner Postmedia announced that the Northern News would reduce its publication to once per week only, and would be distributed to all homes free of charge.

== See also ==
- List of newspapers in Canada
