= Clinton News-Record =

Tabloid publication in Ontario, Canada

- Type: Weekly newspaper
- Format: Tabloid
- Owner: Postmedia
- Editor: Cheryl Heath
- Founded: 1865
- Language: English
- Headquarters: Clinton, Ontario
- Website: clintonnewsrecord.ca

The Clinton News-Record has been a tabloid publication in Ontario, Canada in the town of Clinton, village of Bayfield, and surrounding communities, since 1865. It was a broadsheet publication until it transitioned to tabloid format in 2006.
