= The Intelligencer (Belleville) =

Daily newspaper in Ontario, Canada

- Front page of the May 30, 2020 edition
- Type: Daily newspaper
- Founder: George Benjamin
- Founded: 1834
- City: Belleville, Ontario
- Website: www.intelligencer.ca

The Intelligencer (locally nicknamed the Intell) is the daily (except on Sundays and certain holidays) newspaper of Belleville, Ontario, Canada. The paper is regarded mainly as a local paper, stressing local issues over issues of more national or international scope.

== History ==
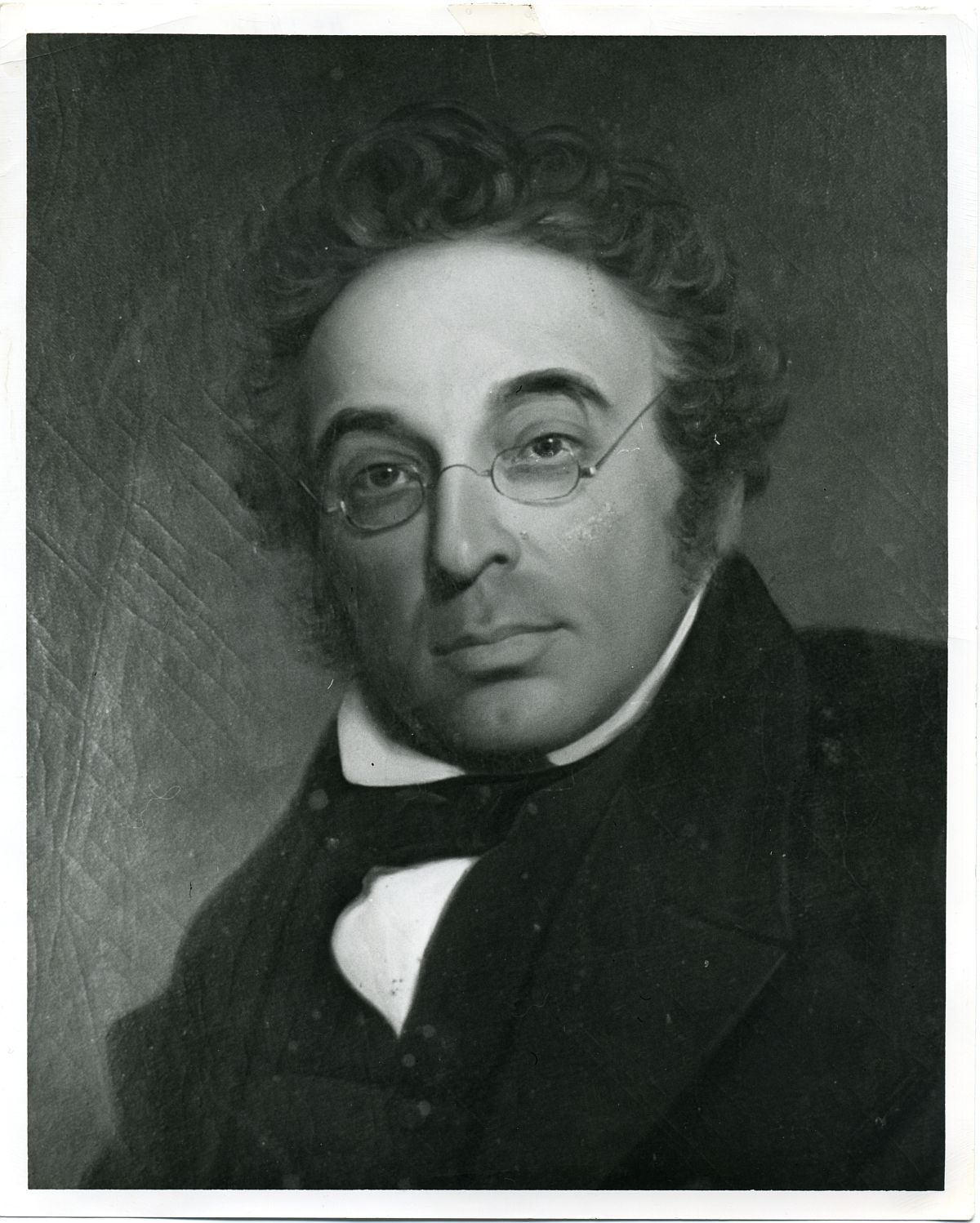
George Benjamin founded the Belleville Intelligencer

The Belleville Intelligencer was founded in 1834 by George Benjamin, who, after just arriving in the city, is said to have stopped in at a hotel and asked to purchase the local newspaper. He was then informed of the young city's lack of a local newspaper, as several attempted newspaper publications turned out to have been short lived and had failed. This innocent question eventually led to George Benjamin establishing the Intelligencer in 1834, although it was originally regarded as another attempt that was likely destined for failure in the long run.

Many newspapers predated the Intelligencer in Belleville, and all folded quickly. The first recorded paper was The Anglo-Canadian in 1829 which folded within a year. Other attempts included The Phoenix in 1831, The Hastings Times and Farmers' Journal in 1833, and finally The Standard of Moira which lasted only six weeks in 1834. These previous failed newspaper publications dampened the original public opinion of the Intelligencer, although the outlooks eventually lightened.

The Intelligencer originally consisted of only four small pages and was originally only a weekly publication. In 1897, D'Alton Corry Coleman became city editor for the Intelligencer at age 18. Later on it would be sold to a young Sir MacKenzie Bowell (a future Canadian Prime Minister), who had come to work for George Benjamin at the Intelligencer. It has also been stated that MacKenzie Bowell's political career started at the Intelligencer, with its then firm political views. After obtaining the Intelligencer MacKenzie Bowell would remain its owner until 1917 the year of his death at the age of 94.

The media group Sun Media purchased the newspaper in 2009. The purchase moved the paper's editorial policy significantly to the right. In spring 2014, the Intelligencer and other Sun Media properties were sold to Postmedia, owner of The National Post in Toronto. The Intelligencer's current advertising director is Gerry Drage, its managing editor W. Brice McVicar.

In September 2017, PostMedia transferred the Intelligencer's distribution to a private distribution company. Big Creek Services Corporation is based in Napanee Ontario and manages the distribution of 5 of PostMedia's newspapers and has a network of almost 500 on contract newspaper carriers.

== See also ==
- List of newspapers in Canada
- Belleville, Ontario#Media
