= Welland Tribune =

Canadian daily newspaper in Ontario

- Front page of the June 5, 2020 edition
- Type: Daily newspaper
- Owner: Metroland Media Group (Torstar)
- Headquarters: 1 St. Paul St; Unit 10; St. Catharines, Ontario
- ISSN: 1186-3129 (print); 0841-632X (web)
- Website: www.wellandtribune.ca

The Welland Tribune is a daily newspaper that services Welland, Ontario and surrounding area. The Tribune was one of several Postmedia Network newspapers purchased by Torstar in a transaction between the two companies which concluded on November 27, 2017. The paper continues to be published by the Metroland Media Group subsidiary of Torstar. In late May 2020, Torstar accepted an offer for the sale of all of its assets to Nordstar Capital in late May 2020, a deal expected to close by year end.

== History ==
The paper's roots are in several formerly competing newspapers: the Fonthill Herald (established in 1854), the Welland Telegraph (established in 1863) and the Port Colborne Citizen. The original owner of the Herald was John Fraser, while the Telegraph was established by the Welland Printing and Book Company. The Herald later moved to Welland, changing its name to People's Press before becoming the Welland Tribune.

The Tribune and the Telegraph merged in 1920, under the ownership of Louis Blake Duff, and continued publication for several years as the Welland Tribune and Telegraph. Duff sold the paper to a consortium of newspaper owners from Galt and Sarnia in 1926, and the new owners shortened the paper's name back to Welland Tribune. In 1929, the Tribune merged with the Port Colborne Citizen, becoming the Welland-Port Colborne Evening Tribune for several years before reverting to Welland Tribune.

The paper was acquired by Roy Thomson in 1943, as one of Thomson's first acquisitions outside of the Northern Ontario region. Henry Foster, the publisher of the newspaper at the time of the sale, continued to serve on the board of directors of the Thomson Newspapers chain.

Publication of the paper was briefly suspended by printers' strikes in 1967 and 1982. During the 1982 action, striking employees founded the Guardian Express, which continued operations as a twice-weekly community newspaper which was acquired by Baxter Publishing in 1985 and by Sinclair Stevens in 1990.

Thomson sold the paper to Hollinger in 1995. The paper was included in Hollinger's sales of its publishing assets to Canwest in 2000, before being sold to Osprey Media in 2003. The paper was included in Osprey's acquisition by Quebecor in 2007, and in Quebecor's subsequent acquisition by Postmedia Network in 2014, before its sale to Torstar was announced in 2017.

== See also ==
- List of newspapers in Canada
