= Camrose Canadian =

Canadian news publication in Alberta

- Type: Weekly newspaper
- Format: Tabloid
- Owner: Postmedia
- Publisher: Nick Goetz
- Editor: Josh Aldrich
- Founded: 1908
- Headquarters: Camrose, Alberta
- Circulation: 14,800
- Website: www.camrosecanadian.com

The Camrose Canadian was a local news publication for the Camrose, Alberta area. Founded in 1908, the paper was one of many Alberta publications owned by Postmedia Network. On June 26, 2018, Postmedia announced that the newspaper would cease publication by the end of August 2018.

== See also ==
- List of newspapers in Canada
