= Chatham This Week =

Canadian local newspaper in Ontario

- Type: Weekly newspaper
- Format: Tabloid
- Owner: Postmedia
- Editor: Peter Epp
- Founded: 1991
- Language: English
- Headquarters: Chatham, Ontario
- Website: chathamthisweek.ca

Chatham This Week is a community newspaper serving the city of Chatham, Ontario with a controlled circulation to approximately 19,400 homes.

== History ==
A tabloid, Chatham This Week was launched in February 1991. Dean Mulharrem has been the publisher since April 2005, while Peter Epp has been the editor since July 1996.

== See also ==
- List of newspapers in Canada
