= Kincardine News =

Canadian newspaper

- Type: Weekly newspaper
- Format: Tabloid
- Owner: Postmedia
- Editor: Hannah MacLeod
- Founded: 1857
- Language: English
- Headquarters: Kincardine, Ontario
- Circulation: 3,290
- Website: www.kincardinenews.com

The Kincardine News is the premier news publication for the Municipality of Kincardine, Ontario, including the communities of Kincardine, Tiverton, Inverhuron, Bervie, Glammis and Armow, as well as serving the neighbouring Huron-Kinloss communities of Ripley and Point Clark.

Kincardine News is a member of the Ontario Community Newspapers Association (OCNA) and is owned by Postmedia. It received Blue Ribbons in 2006 and 2007.

== See also ==
- List of newspapers in Canada
