= North Bay Nugget =

Canadian newspaper in Ontario

- Front page of the June 5, 2020 edition
- Type: Daily newspaper
- Format: Broadsheet
- Owner: Postmedia
- Publisher: Andre Grandchamp
- Founded: 1907
- Language: English
- Headquarters: 259 Worthington Street; North Bay, Ontario; P1B 8J6
- Circulation: 11,505 weekdays 12,127 Saturdays (as of 2011)
- ISSN: 1197-9941
- Website: www.nugget.ca

The North Bay Nugget is a newspaper published in North Bay, Ontario, Canada. The paper is currently owned by Postmedia.

== History ==
The paper was launched in 1907 as the Cobalt Nugget, during the Cobalt, Ontario silver rush. It was acquired by businessmen Harry Browning and W. G. Ferguson within a few months. Initially a weekly, it was expanded into a daily paper in 1909, and Browning was a founding member of Canadian Press when that cooperative was founded in 1917. Following the end of the Cobalt boom, Browning moved the paper to North Bay in 1921; he then sold it to W. E. Mason, the owner of the Sudbury Star, in 1922, and moved to Sudbury in 1927 to become managing editor of the Star.

In 1935, the newspaper received compelling evidence that the famous conservationist Grey Owl, who passed as half-Indian in the latter years of his life, claiming he was the son of a Scottish man and an Apache woman, was in fact an English-born immigrant named Archibald Stansfeld Belaney with no Indigenous ancestry. However, Mason ordered the story held for the remainder of Grey Owl's life, as he appreciated his work. When the paper published the story immediately after Grey Owl's death in 1938, Grey Owl's deception quickly received worldwide press coverage.

Mason remained the Nugget's owner until his death in 1948, following which an employee buyout purchased it from his estate. It was acquired by Southam Newspapers in 1956. Southam acquired the Thomson Newspapers chain in 1996, reuniting the Nugget and the Star under common ownership. The papers were both sold to Osprey Media in 2001, and to Sun Media in 2007. In 2015, Postmedia acquired Sun Media.

On 29 September, 2026, Postmedia announced that the North Bay Nugget and several other Ontario newspapers would no longer be printed, but would transition to online-only publications. The Nugget's last printed edition was published in late October 2026.

== See also ==
- List of newspapers in Canada
