= Whitecourt Star =

Canadian newspaper in Alberta

- Type: Weekly newspaper
- Format: Tabloid
- Owner(s): Postmedia
- Publisher: Pamela Allain
- Editor: Christopher King
- Founded: 1961
- Headquarters: Whitecourt, Alberta
- Circulation: 2,755
- Website: www.whitecourtstar.com

The Whitecourt Star is a weekly newspaper serving the Whitecourt, Alberta area. It is the paper of record for Whitecourt.

In February 2023, the paper stopped its print editions, transitioning to an online-only format.

== See also ==
- List of newspapers in Canada
