= Muskoka Magazine =

- Editor: Sandy Lockhart
- Categories: Lifestyle magazine
- Frequency: Ten times annually
- Founder: Don Smith
- First issue: July 2000
- Final issue: January 2016
- Company: Postmedia Network Canada Corp.
- Country: Canada
- Based in: Bracebridge, Ontario
- Website: www.muskokamagazine.com
- ISSN: 1495-7191

Muskoka Magazine was a large format lifestyle magazine published ten times per year in Bracebridge, Ontario. The magazine was freely delivered throughout the Muskoka region and in the greater Toronto area. It existed between 2000 and 2016.

== History ==
Muskoka Magazine was created by publisher Don Smith in 2000. The first edition was launched in July 2000. In June 2005 the magazine was purchased by Osprey Media. In 2007 the company was acquired by Sun Media, a subsidiary of Quebecor Media.

Muskoka Magazine was published by Cottage Country Communications, a division of Sun Media, a subsidiary of Quebecor Media. In April 2015 Sun Media was acquired by Postmedia Network Canada Corp. The office was located in Bracebridge, Ontario. It was published ten times per year: February, April, May, June, July, August, September, October, November and December. The magazine ceased publication in January 2016.
