= Postmedia Network =

Canadian media company

Postmedia Network Canada Corp.
- Formerly: Canwest Limited Partnership (2000–2010)
- Type: Public
- Traded as: TSX: PNC.A; TSX: PNC.B
- Industry: Mass media
- Predecessor: Canwest
- Founded: July 13, 2010
- Headquarters: Toronto, Ontario, Canada
- Products: Newspapers; media websites; news content
- Revenue: ▲CA$458.2 million (2022)
- Owner: Chatham Asset Management (63.1%); Allianz Global Investors (17.0%); Leon Cooperman (13.3%)
- Number of employees: 2,006 (2021)
- Subsidiaries: Postmedia Network Inc.; PNI Maritimes GP; PNI Maritimes LP; Accelerate360 Canada
- Website: postmedia.com

Postmedia Network Canada Corp. (also known as Postmedia Network, Postmedia News or Postmedia) is a Canadian-based media conglomerate majority-owned by American investors, consisting of the publishing properties of the former Canwest, with primary operations in English-language newspaper publishing, news gathering and Internet operations. It is best known for being the owner of the National Post and the Financial Post. It owns and operates over more than 130 print and digital news titles across Canada.

The company's strategy has seen its publications invest greater resources in digital news gathering and distribution, including expanded websites and digital news apps for smartphones and tablets. This began with a revamp and redesign of the Ottawa Citizen, which debuted in 2014.

Approximately two-thirds of the equity in Postmedia is owned by the media-focused American hedge fund Chatham Asset Management. Under Canadian media ownership laws, Chatham can only elect one-third of Postmedia's board and is not permitted to directly control its operations, though the extent of Chatham's involvement has been disputed. Postmedia publications are known for having a conservative editorial stance. The company is headquartered at Postmedia Place on Bloor Street in Toronto.

== History ==
The ownership group was assembled by National Post CEO Paul Godfrey in 2010 to bid for the chain of newspapers being sold by the financially troubled Asper family's Canwest (the company's broadcasting assets were sold separately to Shaw Communications). Godfrey secured financial backing from a US private equity firm, the Manhattan-based hedge fund GoldenTree Asset Management—which owns 35 per cent—as well as IJNR Investment Trust, Nyppex and other investors. The group completed a $1.1-billion transaction to acquire the chain from Canwest on July 13, 2010.

On October 6, 2014, Postmedia's CEO Godfrey announced a deal to acquire the English-language operations of Sun Media. The purchase received regulatory approval from the federal Competition Bureau on March 25, 2015, even though the company manages competitive papers in several Canadian cities; while the Sun Media chain owns numerous other papers, four of its five Sun-branded tabloids operate in markets where Postmedia already publishes a broadsheet competitor. Board chair Rod Phillips has cited the Vancouver market, in which the two main daily newspapers, the Vancouver Sun and The Province, have had common ownership for over 30 years, as evidence that the deal would not be anticompetitive. The purchase did not include Sun Media's now-defunct Sun News Network. The acquisition was approved by the Competition Bureau on March 25, 2015, and closed on April 13.

In 2016, the company sought to restructure its compensation plans and reduce spending by as much as 20 per cent, after reporting a net loss of $99.4 million, or 35 cents per diluted share, in the fourth-quarter ended August 31, compared with a $54.1-million net loss, or 19 cents per diluted share, in the same period a year earlier. This resulted in 90 newsroom staff losing their jobs. Also in 2016, it was announced that the newsrooms of newspapers in Ottawa, Calgary, Edmonton and Vancouver, where Postmedia owns competing newspapers, would be merged into one newsroom per location while continuing to print each newspaper.

On November 27, 2017, Postmedia and Torstar announced a transaction in which Postmedia will sell seven dailies, eight community papers, and the Toronto and Vancouver 24 Hours to Torstar, in exchange for 22 community papers and the Ottawa and Winnipeg versions of Metro. Except for the Exeter Times-Advocate, St. Catharines Standard, Niagara Falls Review, Peterborough Examiner, and Welland Tribune, all acquired papers will be closed.

On June 26, 2018, Canadian Press reported that, by the end of August, Postmedia will be closing the Camrose Canadian in Camrose, Alberta, Strathmore Standard in Strathmore, Alberta, Kapuskasing Northern Times in Kapuskasing, Ontario, Ingersoll Times in Ingersoll, Ontario, Norwich Gazette in Norwich, Ontario and Petrolia Topic in Petrolia, Ontario. It will also cease printing the Portage Daily Graphic in Portage La Prairie, Manitoba, the Northern News in Kirkland Lake, Ontario, and Pembroke Daily Observer in Pembroke, Ontario while maintaining a digital presence for the three publications. As well, the High River Times in High River, Alberta will go from being published twice a week to once a week.

During the COVID-19 pandemic in Canada, Postmedia laid off approximately 80 employees and permanently closed 15 community publications while navigating the financial strain of COVID-19. While the company utilized government subsidies, they claim they were unable to offset the decline in revenue.

Postmedia closed 15 community newspapers in Manitoba and Ontario's Windsor-Essex area as the publications were no longer financially sustainable. The publications included Manitoba's Altona Red River Valley Echo, Carman Valley Leader, Gimli Intertake Spectator, Morden Times, Selkirk Journal, Stonewall Argus & Teulon Times, Winkler Times, and The Prairie Farmer, leaving Portage La Prairie as the company's community presence in the province. For Ontario, the closures included the Kingsville Reporter, Lakeshore News (Windsor-Essex area), LaSalle Post, Napanee Guide, Paris Star, Tecumseh Shoreline Week, and Tilbury Times.

On February 17, 2022, Postmedia announced a definitive agreement to acquire Brunswick News Inc. (BNI). As well as several New Brunswick daily and weekly newspapers and "digital properties", BNI's assets included a parcel delivery business and "proprietary distribution software".

In 2023, Postmedia announced it would be moving a dozen of its Alberta community papers to digital-only platforms, aiming for more outsourcing deals and laying off employees. The announcement was made January 18, 2023, during an internal memo to staff that was obtained by The Canadian Press, describing the measures as a part of a "transformation plan geared toward managing costs". Later that day, Postmedia said it had also sold the Calgary Herald building for $17.23 million to U-Haul Co. after trying to sell it for nearly a decade.

In July 2023, Postmedia Network Canada Corp. and Nordstar Capital LP announced that merger discussion between the two newspaper publishers will not continue.

On May 27, 2024, Postmedia announced that it would sell the Winnipeg Sun, the Portage la Prairie Graphic Leader, Kenora Miner and News, and company's Winnipeg printing operations to politician and former Sun publisher Kevin Klein.

In July 2024, the company entered into an agreement to acquire SaltWire Network. During the first week of December 2024, Postmedia rebranded Saltwire as PNI Atlantic News, with their websites changing to look like the parent company's other newspapers.

In 2026, Postmedia announced that it would no longer be publishing print editions of six of its newspapers based in northern Ontario, effective at the end of that October. It also announced that it would be shutting down the Cochrane Times-Post and its North Bay printing press completely.

== Operating branch ==
Postmedia News is the news branch of Postmedia Network, providing similar content to all of its subsidiary news outlets and websites. It is identified as a source on all of its subsidiary newspapers. The news agency provides news, sports, entertainment, photography, financial and feature information and data to Postmedia Network's Canadian newspapers, online properties and a number of third party clients in Canada and the United States.

== Criticism ==
=== Ties to right-wing politics ===
In October 2018, it was reported that CEO Andrew MacLeod had declared the company "insufficiently conservative". That resulted in Kevin Libin, who had played an active role in defeating a union drive at the paper earlier that year, taking charge of all political reporting and analysis in Postmedia newspapers to ensure the newspapers became more "reliably conservative." In June 2019, Kevin Libin, comments editor and editorials editor of the National Post and Financial Post and a founding editor of Western Standard, was assigned “executive editor of Postmedia politics". The role focuses on the coverage of federal politics in the National Post. In addition, it focuses on the coverage of federal and provincial politics in all of the dailies owned by Postmedia.

In November 2019, Postmedia announced that 66 per cent of its shares were now owned by Chatham Asset Management, an American media conglomerate which owns American Media, Inc. and is known for its close ties to the Republican Party.

=== Centralization Operations ===
The creation of the Postmedia Network effectively concentrates more than 90 percent of all Canadian dailies and weeklies in one company, a fact lamented by J-Source, a Canadian media watchdog, in a 2015 online article.

Margo Goodhand, a former Edmonton Journal editor-in-chief, wrote in a 2016 Walrus article that Postmedia executives were behind the outsourcing of Postmedia content to a site within an office in Canada for the sake of producing "Regina Leader-Post sports pages, Arts fronts for the Montreal Gazette, editorial pages for the Vancouver Sun". In a 2020 article by The New York Times, it was reported journalists had attested that since Chatham Asset Management took over, Postmedia had centralized operations and cut staff so that its 106 newspapers were essentially clones of one another.

=== Relationship with the government ===
On November 27, 2018, The Competition Bureau applied for a court evaluation contesting Postmedia's claims of solicitor-client privilege, for records seized by the bureau during raids at the company's offices. In March 2018, the Competition Bureau issued a court filing accusing Postmedia and Torstar of structuring the deal they made together with no-compete clauses in an effort to reduce competition in the newspaper industry in violation of the Competition Act.

According to Marc Edge, author of The Postmedia Effect, the network received $9.9 million in government financial assistance in 2022. In the same year, Postmedia's operating income was only $13 million.

=== Treatment of staff ===
In 2016, Paul Godfrey took a $900,000 bonus during a time when Postmedia laid off staff company-wide. CFO Doug Lamb received $450,000, COO Andrew MecLeod $425,000, legal and general counsel Jeffrey Harr $300,000, and National Post president Gordon Fisher $200,000. Unions representing Canadian journalists wanted the Postmedia executives to reject the total $2,275,000 as the newspaper chain continued to cut staff.

=== Decline of journalistic quality ===
In 2015, the Globe and Mail reported that National Post columnist Conrad Black, who used to own some of Postmedia's newspapers and is one of Postmedia's largest investors, told executives that he felt that some of the properties' qualities have deteriorated. Black felt that the company should be investing on improving the quality of its properties.

== Assets ==
=== Advertising ===
- The Flyer Force
- Go!Local

=== Publishing ===
==== Broadsheet dailies and weeklies ====
- National Post
- Financial Post (administratively part of the National Post)
- Belleville Intelligencer
- Brantford Expositor
- Calgary Herald
- Cape Breton Post
- The Chatham Daily News
- The Chronicle Herald (Halifax)
- Cornwall Standard Freeholder
- Edmonton Journal
- Kingston Whig-Standard
- London Free Press
- The Gazette (Montreal)
- North Bay Nugget
- Ottawa Citizen
- Regina Leader-Post
- The StarPhoenix (Saskatoon)
- Sault Star
- The Telegram
- The Telegraph-Journal
- Timmins Daily Press
- Vancouver Sun (not related to the tabloid Sun newspapers also owned by Postmedia)
- Windsor Star

==== Tabloid dailies ====
- Calgary Sun
- Edmonton Sun
- Ottawa Sun
- Sudbury Star
- The Province (Vancouver)
- Toronto Sun

==== Community newspapers ====
Postmedia owns newspapers that serve smaller communities across Canada, including:

- Airdrie Echo (tabloid)
- Bow Valley Crag and Canyon (tabloid)
- Brockville Recorder and Times (broadsheet)
- Chatham This Week (tabloid)
- Clinton News-Record (tabloid)
- Cochrane Times (Alberta) (tabloid)
- Cochrane Times-Post (tabloid)
- Cold Lake Sun (tabloid)
- Drayton Valley Western Review (tabloid)
- Edson Leader (tabloid)
- Elliot Lake Standard (tabloid)
- Fort McMurray Today (tabloid)
- Fort Saskatchewan Record (tabloid)
- Goderich Signal-Star (tabloid)
- Grande Prairie Daily Herald-Tribune (tabloid)
- Hanna Herald (tabloid)
- High River Times (tabloid)
- Hinton Parklander (tabloid)
- Kincardine News (tabloid)
- Kingston This Week (tabloid)
- Lakeshore Advance (Grand Bend; tabloid)
- Leduc Representative (tabloid)
- Lloydminster Meridian Booster (tabloid) sold to Lloydminster Source Ltd
- Mid-North Monitor (Espanola; tabloid)
- Mayerthorpe Freelancer (tabloid)
- Nanton News (tabloid)
- Owen Sound Sun Times (broadsheet)
- Peace River Record-Gazette (broadsheet)
- Pincher Creek Echo (tabloid)
- Red River Valley Echo (tabloid) closed 2020
- Sarnia Observer (broadsheet)
- Sherwood Park News (tabloid)
- Simcoe Reformer (tabloid)
- St. Thomas Times-Journal (tabloid)
- Stratford Beacon Herald (broadsheet)
- Vulcan Advocate (tabloid)
- Vermilion Standard (tabloid)
- Whitecourt Star (tabloid)
- Winkler Times (tabloid)
- Woodstock Sentinel-Review (broadsheet)

==== Former assets ====
- 24 Hours (Toronto, Vancouver) sold to Torstar and closed, 2017
- Barrie Examiner sold to Torstar and closed, 2017
- Bradford Times (tabloid) sold to Torstar and closed, 2017
- Camrose Canadian (tabloid), closed 2018
- Collingwood Enterprise Bulletin sold to Torstar and closed, 2017
- Niagara Falls Review (broadsheet) sold to Torstar, 2017
- Norwich Gazette, closed 2018
- Orillia Packet & Times (broadsheet) sold to Torstar and closed, 2017
- Pembroke Daily Observer (broadsheet), ceasing print edition 2018
- Peterborough Examiner (broadsheet) sold to Torstar, 2017
- St. Catharines Standard (broadsheet) sold to Torstar in 2017
- Strathmore Standard (tabloid), closed 2018

==== Magazines ====
- Financial Post Business
- Living Windsor
- Muskoka Magazine
- Kingston Life Magazine
- Interiors Magazine
- Backpack Magazine
- Cannabis Post
- Muskoka Visitor Guide
- Ontario Farmer Magazines (Hog, Beef, Dairy)
- TVtimes

==== Online ====
- Canada.com
- Infomart.com
- Canoe.com
- celebrating.com
- connecting.com
- driving.ca
- househunting.ca
- remembering.ca
- shoplocal.ca
- SwarmJam.com

In addition, Postmedia Network owns all websites associated with all properties listed on this page either wholly or in partnership.

=== Software ===
- QuickTrac
- QuickWire

== See also ==
Other media groups in Canada include:

- Quebecor Media – Canadian media company
- SaltWire Network – Canadian newspaper publishing company
- TC Transcontinental
- The Woodbridge Company – Canadian holding company
- Torstar – Canadian mass media company
  - Metroland Media Group – Canadian news company in Ontario
  - Star Media Group

=== Related articles ===
- History of Canadian newspapers
- Media of Canada
