= Edson Leader =

Canadian newspaper in Alberta

- Type: Weekly newspaper
- Format: Tabloid
- Owner: Postmedia
- Publisher: Tyler Waugh
- Editor: Victoria Camaghan
- Founded: 1911
- Ceased publication: 2020
- Headquarters: 4820 3 Avenue; Edson, Alberta; T7E 1T8
- Circulation: 2,824
- Website: www.edsonleader.com

The Edson Leader was a weekly newspaper published in Edson, Alberta, Canada, from 1911 until 2020.

== Background ==
The paper was founded in 1911, with its first issue published on February 17, 1911, under editor James A. Andrews. It was one of several early newspapers in Edson, alongside short-lived competitors such as the Western Star and the Edson Herald. W.C.R. Garrioch became editor and manager in 1913.

In 1960, the Edson Leader acquired the Western Signal, consolidating local newspaper operations. Publisher Douglas M. Caston was associated with the paper’s development in the mid-20th century. The newspaper briefly became bi-weekly in 1978 before returning to a weekly schedule in 1984.

Craig McArthur and Elaine McArthur later worked in management at the Edson Leader before leaving after it became part of a newspaper chain, and subsequently founded The Weekly Anchor.

== Closure ==
The Edson Leader ceased publication on January 13, 2020, following its closure by Postmedia Network. The Edson area continues to be served by The Weekly Anchor, a local weekly newspaper that has published for over 30 years.

== See also ==
- List of newspapers in Canada
