= Josiah Blackburn =

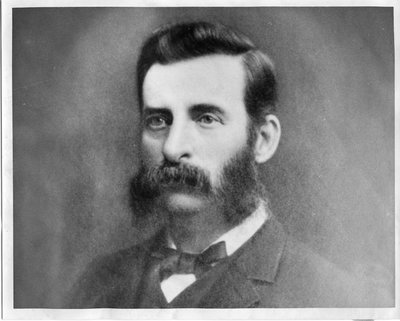
- Blackburn possibly in 1863-1873
- Born: 6 March 1823
- Died: 11 November 1890 (aged 67)
- Spouse: Emma Dallimore (several spellings of this surname are possible)
- Parents: Reverend John Blackburn of London, England (father); Sarah Smith of Great Bardfield, Essex. (mother)

Josiah Blackburn (6 March 1823 – 11 November 1890) was an English-born Canadian newspaper publisher, journalist, and political figure. In 1852 he purchased a struggling weekly newspaper in the frontier town of London, Canada West, and within a generation built it into the London Free Press, one of the most influential newspapers in Ontario. Blackburn is regarded as one of Canada's most important nineteenth-century newspapermen: an innovator in advertising, circulation, and reporting practice, and a politically well-connected figure whose paper moved from Reform to Conservative allegiance under his direction. The Free Press remained under the control of his descendants for more than a century after his death.

== Early life ==
Josiah Blackburn was born on 6 March 1823 in London, England, the third son of the Reverend John Blackburn, a leading Congregational minister who held the pulpit of Claremont Chapel in London for some thirty-five years and served for many years as secretary of the Congregational Union of England and Wales. His mother, Sarah Smith, was the daughter of Robert Smith, a landed proprietor of Essex. The Blackburns had eleven children, and John Blackburn made considerable effort, within his modest means, to see each of them well educated. Josiah was educated at the City of London School and Mill Hill School, and, like the other children of the family, is believed to have made the customary "Grand Tour" of the Continent common among the sons of English gentlemen of the period.

Family tradition traced Blackburn's paternal ancestry to the Blackburns of Lancashire and Yorkshire, and held — according to an unverified family legend — that a remote forebear, "Blackburn of York," had been a pirate before repenting, entering the church, and eventually becoming a bishop nicknamed the "Fiddling Bishop of York" for his love of the violin. Better documented was his father's own descent from the Suffolk Juxon family: its most distinguished member, Bishop William Juxon (1582–1663), attended Charles I on the scaffold at his execution in 1649 and received from the condemned king a ring engraved with the word "Memento," later preserved in the British Museum. Decades afterward, one of Josiah's grandsons was named Walter Juxon Blackburn in tribute to this ancestry.

Unlike Josiah, his younger brother Stephen took up the printing trade directly, becoming a partner in the London firm of Blackburn & Burt at the age of twenty-three. It was this fraternal connection to the printing business, and a family tie to Canada through an elder brother, John Blackburn, who owned the weekly Star of Paris, Canada West, that appears to have drawn Josiah across the Atlantic. He emigrated to Canada West in 1850, crossing the Atlantic in a wooden sailing vessel, and, in the early 1850s, joined his brother's staff at the Star and also became involved with the Ingersoll Chronicle, quickly demonstrating what contemporaries called a natural gift for political writing; his editorials were soon being reprinted by other papers in the province, including the one he would shortly come to own.

== Founding of the Free Press ==
The paper that would become Blackburn's life's work had begun as a modest weekly, The Canadian Free Press, founded in London, Canada West, in 1849 by a young Scottish printer, William Sutherland. Sutherland's venture was chronically underfinanced; a short-lived and financially disastrous attempt to publish a daily edition, together with legal costs from a libel suit, left him deeply in debt to his own lawyer, James Daniell, who held a mortgage of $500 against the printing plant — representing roughly two-thirds of its total value.

In November 1852, Daniell met Blackburn, by then editor of the Paris Star, at the opening of a new Masonic lodge in Woodstock, Ontario. The connection led directly to a sale that same year: Blackburn, then twenty-nine, purchased the mortgage and the paper from Daniell, and on 1 January 1853 formally took over as editor and proprietor of The Canadian Free Press, operating out of a small printing office at the back of a dry-goods store on the east side of Talbot Street, a few doors north of Dundas Street. He inherited Sutherland's old type, his battered hand press, his debts, and a legacy of local political feuds, and at first changed so little that London's Reformers could barely detect a change of ownership. It was, as his biographer later put it, the caution of "an expert mountain climber, who tests each foothold before he puts his weight on it."

That caution gave way to ambition as London's fortunes rose with the approach of the Great Western Railway. Blackburn expanded operations through 1854, installing new presses and reorganizing the paper's cramped North Street building into distinct news, job-printing and business departments. Anticipating that the old hand press could not keep pace with a daily print run, he installed a steam-driven Northrup stop-cylinder press — the first power press erected in the city of London, with a rated capacity of some 600 papers an hour. On 5 May 1855, he launched The London Free Press and Daily Western Advertiser — London's first permanent daily newspaper — while continuing the original weekly under its established name, The Canadian Free Press, which remained the paper's financial mainstay for years afterward. (The daily was retitled simply The London Free Press in 1872.) By the end of 1855 the demands of running a daily were pressing enough that Blackburn sent to England for his brother Stephen, who joined him in 1858 as a full partner, assisting Josiah with reporting and editorial writing as well as running the business office; the firm became "J. and S. Blackburn, printers and publishers." Stephen remained until 1871, when he left to become registrar of titles for West Middlesex at Glencoe, an appointment secured in part through Josiah's friendship with the new Ontario premier, John Sandfield Macdonald.

Blackburn proved an energetic innovator. He made the Free Press the first newspaper in Canada West to require cash in advance from subscribers rather than the credit system then standard in the trade, and the first in the province to adopt a fixed schedule of advertising rates. In 1857 the paper ran a newspaper advertisement seeking "Six Young Women / Of intelligence and respectability" to learn typesetting — a striking departure at a time when employing women outside teaching or domestic work was widely regarded as improper, though the move drew public praise from the veteran radical William Lyon Mackenzie. Blackburn also pioneered the use of travelling correspondents and paid agricultural writers, features other Canadian papers later copied. By 1860, the combined circulation of the paper's daily and weekly editions had reached about 3,500, second in Reform journalism only to George Brown's Toronto Globe. As late as 1861 the paper's total capital investment was still only about $2,000 — a fact Blackburn was fond of turning into an epigram: "My capital is felicity of expression." It employed a staff of 22 at the time.

The young paper weathered several crises. The financial panic of 1857 forced Blackburn to accept farm produce and store goods in place of cash for subscriptions, and by October of that year the daily edition was briefly suspended; it resumed after little more than a month, helped in part by a timely contribution from the personal funds of Blackburn's wife, Emma. The paper's coverage of the visit of the Prince of Wales to London in September 1860 produced what was then the largest single edition ever printed in the city — some 7,200 copies of an illustrated souvenir number. During the American Civil War, Blackburn is believed to have been the unnamed "Canadian editor" who obtained a brief private audience with President Abraham Lincoln in Washington in the summer of 1864 — an account later reprinted in the American press and, in 1961, in a compiled volume of Lincoln's recorded conversations. The visiting editor recalled Lincoln rising to greet him with a careful, gentle handshake and remarking on the burdens of an office he had come to almost by accident, as, in Lincoln's own words, "a boy brought up in the woods." Blackburn came away from the meeting convinced of Lincoln's integrity, and the Free Press and its readers reacted to the president's assassination the following year with a public memorial service. During the Fenian raid scare of June 1866, eight members of the paper's own staff were called up for volunteer militia service, and Blackburn and his brother worked through several sleepless nights assembling the news as it trickled in from the Niagara frontier.

By 1868 the paper had outgrown its North Street quarters and moved to new premises on Richmond Street, where it would remain until the early 1930s. On 3 July 1871, Blackburn placed the business on a joint-stock footing as the London Free Press Printing Company, taking on John K. Clare, Henry Mathewson, and future newspaper baron William Southam (who had started as a twelve-year-old Free Press paperboy in 1855) as co-partners; the company was formally incorporated on 8 October 1878, with capital stock of $60,000. From 1871 Blackburn was no longer involved in day-to-day production, though he continued to control the paper's editorial direction for the rest of his life. The reorganized company introduced new type and presses, launched an evening edition, and adopted "pyramid" headlines summarizing news in bold print — along with an early and, for the period, unusual policy (formalized in 1878) of reporting political speeches without editorial slant, regardless of party.

== Political career and allegiances ==
Blackburn was, from the outset, a political partisan as well as a newspaperman, and the Free Press carried a Reform (Liberal) banner through its early decades. He stood unsuccessfully as the Reform candidate for Middlesex East in the 1857–58 election, losing to Marcus Talbot, editor of the rival London Prototype. He supported reciprocity with the United States, retrenchment in government spending, temperance, and representation by population, while opposing separate schools and Sunday labour.

His relationship with Reform leader George Brown deteriorated over the "double shuffle" affair of 1858, when Blackburn broke with Brown and other Reform editors by accepting the courts' ruling that the manoeuvre, however unseemly, had not been illegal. By 1859 Blackburn had concluded that Brown could never unite the party, particularly after alienating Lower Canadian Reformers, and he was pointedly slighted at the Reform party's Great Convention that November — not admitted as a delegate, despite his standing as a former Reform candidate and editor, until the proceedings were opened to all journalists. Blackburn's paper increasingly aligned itself instead with the moderate Reform faction led by John Sandfield Macdonald.

When Sandfield Macdonald and Louis-Victor Sicotte formed a government in May 1862, the Free Press became its chief mouthpiece in western Canada West, and Blackburn himself went to Quebec City to take charge of a government-aligned paper, the Quebec Mercury, serving as publisher (with George Sheppard as editor) from August 1862 until the government's resignation in March 1864. He supported the coalition that formed to pursue Confederation in June 1864, despite his estrangement from Brown, and came to see Confederation chiefly as a route to greater Canadian self-direction and reduced imperial defence obligations — a position that drew accusations from opponents that the Free Press secretly favoured annexation to the United States.

Brown's resignation from the coalition cabinet in December 1865, followed by Sandfield Macdonald's appointment as the first premier of Ontario in 1867, completed Blackburn's drift toward Sir John A. Macdonald and the Conservative party, whose cause the Free Press thereafter served as one of its most reliable organs in western Ontario. Blackburn became a close friend of the London Conservative member of Parliament (and future federal cabinet minister) Sir John Carling. In 1872 he travelled to Toronto to help establish the Toronto Mail as a Conservative counterweight to the Globe — the fifth newspaper he had founded or reorganized — and served roughly fifteen months as its chief of staff. He remained, however, an independent-minded Conservative, offering only qualified support to Macdonald's National Policy tariff in the 1870s, and defending Macdonald's government stoutly through the Pacific Scandal of 1873. A memoir written by his daughter Grace after his death insisted that Blackburn never regarded this political migration as a betrayal of his liberal convictions, portraying him instead as having come to see Macdonald as the more genuinely open-minded of the two leaders — particularly toward French Canadians.

Blackburn's independence was tested most severely in 1884–85. A Free Press editorial that December, "Blindfolded Justice," accused the Middlesex County crown attorney, Charles Hutchinson, of perverting justice; Hutchinson responded by having Blackburn charged with criminal libel — a proceeding that, unlike a civil suit, would have barred Blackburn from testifying in his own defence. At the trial, held at the Middlesex spring assizes in May 1885, defence counsel B. B. Osler was able to show that Hutchinson himself had repeatedly and publicly attacked Blackburn and the paper beforehand; the jury vindicated Blackburn completely, and the Free Press emerged from the episode, if anything, with enhanced circulation and standing.

Blackburn also undertook two federal government appointments in the 1880s: in 1880 he served as a census commissioner for western Ontario, and in 1884 as a commissioner charged with investigating government printing operations, including a tour of printing bureaus in Washington and several American state capitals. His findings contributed to the creation of Canada's Department of Public Printing and Stationery in 1886.

== Personal life and civic activities ==
Blackburn married Emma Jane Dallimore on 29 May 1851. The couple had eight children — two sons, Walter Josiah (b. 1862) and Arthur Stephen (b. 1869), both of whom later took over management and ownership of the Free Press, and six daughters. One daughter, Victoria Grace Blackburn — known simply as Grace, who wrote for the paper for decades (from 1894) under the pen name "Fanfan" and became its literary and drama critic in 1900 and assistant managing editor in 1918 — went on to a notable career of her own as a journalist, poet, novelist, and playwright. After Emma's death, Blackburn married a second time, to Marion Billington, in 1886. Although raised in a Congregationalist household, Blackburn and his entire family were rebaptized in the Church of England at St Paul's Cathedral, London, Ontario, on 23 August 1866.

In London, Blackburn was active well beyond the newspaper office. He served on the executive committee of the London Musical Union, promoted the local mechanics' institute, was a charter member of the reorganized London Board of Trade in 1881, and supported efforts to establish a branch of the provincial university in the city.

A warm and more intimate portrait survives in a memoir Grace Blackburn wrote of her father after his death. She recalled a man who loved long country walks, played whist most evenings, staged amateur theatricals with friends on a small stage with footlights that he had built in his own home, and liked to read aloud to his family from the classics and from the English periodicals that arrived with the transatlantic mail. An enthusiastic early adopter of new technology and, by her account, an acquaintance of Alexander Graham Bell, he had one of the first private telephones installed in London.

Those who worked for Blackburn generally described him as reserved and exacting, and scrupulously fair. His early political campaigns in Middlesex ended in defeat, and his outspoken editorial positions occasionally provoked physical confrontation. In the 1860s, not long after his break with the Clear Grits, a political opponent struck him from behind with steel knuckles on the steps of the London post office, breaking his nose; two decades later, according to Grace's memoir, the same man returned to apologize, and Blackburn not only forgave him but later helped him find steady work. Colleagues nonetheless respected his integrity. John Cameron, who began his career under Blackburn before becoming editor of the rival London Advertiser, wrote after Blackburn's death that "for a man who could engage in the rough-and-tumble tussles over public affairs as he did, and yet retain the personal friendship of the most ardent opponents of the principles which he expounded, a superior, kindly, generous nature must be claimed."

== Death and legacy ==
Blackburn's health declined steadily through the late 1880s, and he spent increasing periods at Hot Springs, Arkansas, seeking treatment, leaving much of the paper's daily direction to his long-serving managing editor, Malcolm Bremner. He died at Hot Springs on 11 November 1890, at the age of sixty-seven. News of his death was met with widespread tributes across the Ontario press. The Free Press itself announced simply, "OUR CHIEF IS DEAD." The Woodstock Sentinel-Review praised his "calm and judicial" temperament, while the St. Thomas Journal described "a sturdy, manly character, tending to the verge of ruggedness."

At his death in 1890, Blackburn's estate held real and personal assets of nearly $20,000, plus company shares valued at about $35,000 (in the London Free Press Printing Company and the Carling Brewing and Malting Company) and 400 acres of farmland in Manitoba. His will left his 601 shares of common stock in the printing company to his son Walter Josiah and his nephew Henry Stephen Blackburn as executors and trustees, with instructions that the stock be sold only "en bloc" and never transferred outside the family; $5,000 of the eventual proceeds was to be invested to provide his widow, Marion, with an income for the rest of her life, and the remainder was to be divided among the children of his first marriage.

Blackburn had transformed a debt-ridden pioneer weekly into one of Ontario's most influential newspapers, and the London Free Press remained under Blackburn family ownership for more than a century — a degree of family continuity historians have described as unique among Canadian newspapers. He is commemorated by an Ontario Heritage Trust historical plaque at his former residence at 76 Albert Street in London, Ontario (now the site of the London Squash Racquets Club), which credits him as "one of the province's most influential newspaper publishers."

== Bibliography ==
- Jones, Elwood H. (1982). "Blackburn, Josiah". Dictionary of Canadian Biography. Vol. 11. University of Toronto/Université Laval.
- Reaney, James Stewart (2005). "Blackburn, Victoria Grace". Dictionary of Canadian Biography. Vol. 15. University of Toronto/Université Laval.
- Miller, Orlo (1949). A Century of Western Ontario: The Story of London, "The Free Press," and Western Ontario, 1849–1949. Toronto: Ryerson Press.
- Nolan, Michael (1989). Walter J. Blackburn: A Man for All Media. Toronto: Macmillan of Canada.
- Segal, Charles M. (1961). Conversations with Lincoln. New York: G. P. Putnam's Sons.
- "Josiah Blackburn (1823–1890)". Ontario Heritage Trust.
- "Josiah Blackburn Historical Plaque". Ontario's Historical Plaques.
- Landon, Fred (1927). "Some Early Newspapers and Newspaper Men of London". Transactions of the London and Middlesex Historical Society. 12: 26–34.
- Miller, H. O. (1937). "The History of the Newspaper Press in London, 1830–1875". Ontario History. 32: 114–139.
