= Exeter Lakeshore Times-Advance =

Canadian newspaper in Ontario

- Type: Weekly newspaper
- Format: Tabloid
- Owner: Postmedia Network
- Founded: 1873; 153 years ago (Exeter Times-Advocate; 1880; 146 years ago (Lakeshore Advance)
- City: Exeter, Ontario
- Country: Canada
- Website: https://www.lakeshoreadvance.com/

The Exeter Lakeshore Times-Advance is a weekly local newspaper, published in the town of Exeter, Ontario. It serves the counties of Huron, Middlesex, and Lambton. It was established in 1873 as the Exeter Times-Advocate.

The Exeter Times-Advocate was one of several Torstar-owned newspapers purchased by Postmedia in a transaction between the two companies which concluded on November 27, 2017. The paper will continue to be published by Postmedia. In 2018, the Exeter Times Advocate merged with the Grand Bend-based Lakeshore Advance to create the Exeter Lakeshore Times-Advance.
