= Lloydminster Meridian Booster =

Canadian newspaper in Saskatchewan

Meridian Booster
- Type: Weekly newspaper
- Format: Tabloid
- Owner: Lloydminster Source
- Publisher: Reid Keebaugh
- Managing editor: Taylor Weaver
- Founded: 1959
- Circulation: 14,401
- Website: www.meridianbooster.com

The Lloydminster Meridian Booster is a newspaper based out of Lloydminster, Alberta/Saskatchewan, Canada. It is published weekly on Wednesday. It publishes a mix of community, provincial and national news and is owned by the Lloydminster Source, another newspaper based out of Lloydminster.

== History ==
In 1958, Byron Keebaugh founded Meridian Printing Ltd. and founded the Meridian Booster the following year in 1959. Keebaugh an early adopter of offset printing, introduced the technology to Lloydminster at a time when it was generally only used in larger newspaper markets like Edmonton and Calgary. The Booster was later sold to Sun Media. Following the founding of the Booster, Keebaugh also came to own numerous community newspapers including The Vermilion Standard, The Meadow Lake Progress, and the Bonnyville Nouvelle. In December 2016, Postmedia, the successor to Sun Media, sold the newspaper to the Lloydminster Source.

== See also ==
- List of newspapers in Canada
