= Hinton Parklander =

Defunct American weekly newspaper

The Hinton Parklander
- Type: Weekly newspaper
- Format: Tabloid
- Owner: Postmedia
- Publisher: Pamela Allain
- Editor: Ian McInnes
- Founded: 1955
- Ceased publication: 2020
- Headquarters: Hinton, Alberta
- Circulation: 4,149
- Website: www.hintonparklander.com

The Hinton Parklander was a weekly newspaper serving the Hinton, Alberta area. The newspaper was established in 1955, and operated until Postmedia ceased publishing it on January 13, 2020.

== See also ==
- List of newspapers in Canada
