= Interlake Spectator =

Canadian newspaper

- Type: Weekly newspaper
- Format: Broadsheet
- Owner: Postmedia
- Founded: 1972
- Ceased publication: 2020
- Headquarters: Gimli, Manitoba
- Circulation: 14,954
- Website: www.interlakespectator.com

The Interlake Spectator was a local news publication for the Gimli, Manitoba area. Founded in 1972, the paper was one of many Manitoba publications owned by Postmedia Network. On May 7, 2020, Postmedia announced that the newspaper would cease publication.

== See also ==
- List of newspapers in Canada
