= Cochrane Times-Post =

Former newspaper in Ontario, Canada

- Type: Weekly newspaper
- Format: Tabloid
- Owner: Postmedia
- Editor: Nora Egan
- Founded: 1910
- Ceased publication: 2026
- Language: English
- Headquarters: Box 10, Cochrane, Ontario.
- Website: cochranetimespost.ca

The Cochrane Times-Post was a weekly newspaper published on Friday. The newspaper served Cochrane, Ontario, and the surrounding area, and had a weekly circulation of approximately 2,600 copies.

== History ==
The Times purchased the archives of the oldest newspaper in Cochrane in 1994, hence the name Times-Post. The previous paper was in the community since 1910. The paper is a tabloid newspaper, and focuses on community events, people, etc.

In 2026, Postmedia announced that it would stop publishing the Cochrane Times-Post at the end of that October.

== See also ==
- List of defunct newspapers of Canada
