= Barrie Examiner =

Canadian newspaper in Ontario

- Type: Daily newspaper
- Founder: William Manley Nicholson
- Founded: 1864
- Ceased publication: November 27, 2017
- City: Barrie, Ontario
- ISSN: 0839-4156
- Website: thebarrieexaminer.com

The Barrie Examiner was a daily newspaper published in Barrie, Ontario from 1864 to 2017.

== History ==
The Examiner was founded in 1864. Publisher William Manley Nicholson launched the paper as an alternate to the Northern Advance, which already had a strong political voice in the community of over 3,500 people.

In the years since then, the Examiner has changed ownership and location several times. In 1889, Nicholson sold the newspaper to Andrew F. Hunter, who later wrote two volumes of the History of Simcoe County (1909). Hunter sold his interests in 1895 to James Alexander MacLaren, a former city editor at the Chatham Daily Banner. At the time, the Examiner was located at 169 Dunlop Street East.

By 1909, there was a thriving competition among newspapers of the day; four weekly newspapers served the community with each presenting a different political viewpoint. In August 1914, two days before the First World War, a major fire changed the course of history at the Examiner. Although the fire caused extensive damage to the newspaper's building and equipment, MacLaren continued to publish with the help of the rival Saturday Morning weekly, owned by brothers Fred and William Walls. MacLaren set up an office in the basement of the Ross Block and used the composing room and press equipment of the Saturday Morning to keep the paper coming out. Six months later, MacLaren and William Walls joined forces to publish The Barrie Examiner and Saturday Morning.

Eventually, the paper's name was shortened, although the Examiner continued to publish the paper out of the Saturday Morning offices. The successful partnership lasted 25 years, until Wall's death in 1939. The next year, the Examiner bought its competitor, the Northern Advance.

During the post-war years, Barrie started to boom, and the Examiner grew along with it. In 1948, the Examiner began publishing twice weekly and launched a busy commercial printing business. By 1952, the paper had boosted production to three times a week — Monday, Wednesday and Friday.

Over the years, the Examiner was often recognized as one of the finest weekly newspapers in the country: it is a six-time winner of the Mason Trophy, as the best all-round newspaper in Canada.

In 1957, the Examiner was sold to Thomson Newspapers Limited. The company immediately embarked on an expansion and began building a modern commercial printing plant at its new location at 16 Bayfield Street. The downtown location served as the home of the Examiner for the next 43 years. The Examiner began publishing daily on November 16, 1958.

On July 28, 1995, the Examiner's top story was the sale of the newspaper to Hollinger Inc. controlled by well-known Canadian businessman Conrad Black.

In December 1999, the Examiner moved its base of operations to 571 Bayfield Street North.

On August 1, 2001, Osprey Media Group Inc., headed by Michael Sifton, the former president of Hollinger Canadian Newspapers, bought the Examiner. Osprey once published 32 newspapers across Ontario.

On May 31, 2007, Osprey Media was acquired by Québecor Média for $517 million. This move welcomed the Examiner into Sun Media and created Canada's largest newspaper publishing enterprise. In 2015, Sun Media, including the Examiner, was purchased by Postmedia.

== Shutdown ==
The Barrie Examiner was one of several Postmedia newspapers purchased by Torstar in a transaction between the two companies which concluded on November 27, 2017. Following the acquisition, Torstar subsidiary Metroland Media Group announced the closure of the paper effective immediately.

== See also ==
- List of newspapers in Canada
