= Pincher Creek Echo =

- Type: Weekly newspaper
- Format: Tabloid
- Owner(s): Postmedia
- Publisher: Roxanne Mackintosh
- Editor: Andrew Glen McCutcheon
- Founded: 1900
- Headquarters: Pincher Creek, Alberta
- Circulation: 1,240
- Website: www.pinchercreekecho.com

The Pincher Creek Echo is a Canadian weekly newspaper serving the Pincher Creek, Alberta area, including the communities of Cowley, the Piikani Indian Reserve and Waterton Lakes National Park.

The newspaper was founded in 1900 by publisher E.T. Saunders as the Rocky Mountain Echo.

The Echo is the paper of record for Pincher Creek.

After the Fort Macleod Gazette, the Echo is the second oldest surviving newspaper in Alberta.

== See also ==
- List of newspapers in Canada
