= Sarnia Observer =

Canadian newspaper in Ontario

- Type: Daily newspaper
- Format: Broadsheet
- Owner(s): Postmedia
- Editor: Rod Hilts
- Founded: 1853
- Language: English
- Headquarters: Sarnia, Ontario, Canada
- Circulation: 12,173 weekdays 13,691 Saturdays (as of 2011)
- Website: theobserver.ca

The Observer has been serving Sarnia-Lambton, Ontario, Canada since 1853 and publishes five times per week, Tuesday through Saturday. The offices of the Observer are in Sarnia. The paper is printed in London, Ontario, on presses owned by Postmedia, which also publishes the London Free Press and Windsor Star.

== See also ==
- List of newspapers in Canada
