= Mid-North Monitor =

Canadian weekly newspaper in Ontario

The Mid-North Monitor
- Type: Weekly newspaper
- Format: Tabloid
- Owner: Postmedia
- Editor: Kevin McSheffrey
- Founded: 1978
- Language: Espanola, Ontario, P5E 1L1
- Website: Mid-North Monitor

The Mid-North Monitor is a Canadian weekly newspaper, published in Espanola, Ontario. The newspaper has a readership circulation of just under 2,400 copies weekly.

== History ==
The newspaper celebrated its 30th anniversary in 2008 as the Mid-North Monitor, but it had several predecessors including the Mid-North Weekly and the Espanola Standard. The region is also served by the Sudbury Star.

In addition to Espanola, the newspaper serves the communities Sables-Spanish Rivers, Baldwin, Nairn and Hyman, and Spanish, as well as the first nations of Serpent River, Sagamok, and Whitefish River.

On 29 September 2026, Postmedia, the Mid-North Monitor's owner, announced that the Monitor and several other Ontario newspapers would no longer be printed, but would transition to online-only publications. The Monitor's last printed edition was published in late October 2026.

== See also ==
- List of newspapers in Canada
