= Bradford Times =

Canadian newspaper in Ontario

- Type: Weekly newspaper
- Format: Tabloid
- Owner: Metroland Media Group (Torstar)
- Editor: Miriam King
- Founded: 1991
- Ceased publication: November 27, 2017
- Language: English
- Headquarters: 74 John St. W., Box 1570, Bradford, Ontario, L3Z 2B8
- Website: bradfordtimes.ca

The Bradford Times was a weekly community newspaper founded in October 1991 and terminated in November, 2017.

== History ==
The Bradford West Gwillimbury Times served the Bradford West Gwillimbury, south Innisfil and Holland Marsh areas for over 18 years – covering local Town Council, charity and cultural events, sports and business news. It was delivered free by carrier, throughout its distribution area. Miriam King was the Editor since the paper was first published.

== Shutdown ==
The Bradford Times was one of several Postmedia newspapers purchased by Torstar in a transaction between the two companies which concluded on November 27, 2017. The closure of the paper was effective immediately.

== See also ==
- List of newspapers in Canada
