= St. Thomas Times-Journal =

Canadian newspaper in Ontario

- Front page of the June 2, 2020 edition
- Owner(s): Postmedia
- Country: Canada
- ISSN: 0839-1580
- Website: www.stthomastimesjournal.com

The St. Thomas Times-Journal is the city newspaper of St. Thomas, Ontario, Canada, and is owned by Postmedia.

The publication focuses on the newsworthy events in St. Thomas and surrounding municipalities, such as the sports teams of Aylmer.

== History ==
St. Thomas and Elgin County are served by a small city daily newspaper - The St. Thomas Times-Journal.

Since July 2, 1918, this newspaper has carried that name across its masthead. It represents the amalgamation of the two daily newspapers that served St. Thomas and Elgin for many years, the St. Thomas Times and the St. Thomas Journal.

The predecessors of these two dailies were started as weekly publications years before St. Thomas reached the size where the publishers felt that daily publication was warranted.

St. Thomas has had newspapers since 1831 when the first weekly appeared. It was not only the first newspaper in St. Thomas but also the first to be called the Journal. George and Thomas Hodgkinson, brothers, were the publishers and editors. Their paper had been in existence only a year when a competitor called the Liberal came out in 1832, with Asahel B. Lewis as its editor. In 1833, the Rev. Donald Fraser, a Presbyterian minister only recently arrived from Scotland, became the editor of the Journal, while in 1834, two men named Kent and Kipp acquired the Liberal. Within three years, both papers were out of existence.

From then until 1873, St. Thomas had many newspaper ventures, all of them short-lived, except McLachlin's Journal and Wilkinson's Times. To mention a few of the short-lived newspapers that appeared during that period: the St. Thomas Enquirer, started by John Kent (newspaperman) in 1837; the St. Thomas Chronicle, which was begun by O'Reilly and Newcombe in 1843; The Canadian Freeman, edited by L. Cunningham Kearney from 1846 to 1851; the St. Thomas Watchman made a brief appearance; then followed the Weekly Dispatch and the British Standard.

The Journal was the first to appear in daily form. On September 3, 1881, James S. Brierley, later publisher of the Montreal Herald, with E.E. Sheppard and William Westlake, bought out the St. Thomas Evening Journal, after buying the semi-weekly Home Journal from Archibald McLachlin, pioneer bookseller and publisher of St. Thomas. Westlake died before the first issue came out; and in 1883, Brierley acquired sole ownership of the Journal, continuing until 1906 when he sold the paper to the Arthur S. Smith of St. Thomas, who disposed of it the following year to F.W. Sutherland, now president and general manager of Sutherland Press, Limited, of St. Thomas. From 1896 until 1906, Brierley published both the St. Thomas Journal and the Montreal Herald, being president and general manager of the latter newspaper until his death.

The St. Thomas Times was started as a weekly by Jonathan Wilkinson, an experienced newspaperman from Guelph, in 1871. The Times did not become a daily until December 2, 1882. For many years both the Times and the Journal continued to publish weekly editions, both having wide rural circulations.

In 1889, A.E. Wallace and John W. Eedy bought the Times from Wilkinson, then in 1902, L.H. Dingman, who had come to St. Thomas a few years before from Stratford, as business manager of the Journal, became owner and published of the Times. He has been actively identified in the editing and publication of St. Thomas' daily newspapers ever since.

With the amalgamation of the two dailies in 1918, Dingman became president and treasurer of The Times-Journal of St. Thomas, Limited. For many years he was also the managing editor of The Times-Journal.

A rather serious fire in the Journal building, only about a block east of the Times building, was a factor in bringing about the amalgamation. After the fire, for some time, both papers were printed on the Times press.

Later the Times-Journal was purchased by Lord Thomson and became part of the Thomson chain of newspapers.

== See also ==
- List of newspapers in Canada
