= Elliot Lake Standard =

Canadian newspaper in Ontario

- Type: Weekly newspaper
- Owner: Postmedia
- Website: elliotlakestandard.ca

The Elliot Lake Standard is a weekly newspaper, published in Elliot Lake, Ontario. Owned by Postmedia, the paper publishes each Thursday and serves much of the North Shore region, including Iron Bridge, Blind River, Spanish and Sables-Spanish Rivers.

The paper was first published in the 1880s on St. Joseph Island, as the St. Joseph Island Herald. Following the emergence of Elliot Lake as the region's principal community in the 1950s, the paper moved to the city and became the Elliot Lake Standard in 1957.

On 29 September 2026, Postmedia announced that the Standard and several other Ontario newspapers would no longer be printed, but would transition to online-only publications. The Standard's last printed edition will be published in late October 2026.

== See also ==
- List of newspapers in Canada
