= Cornwall Standard-Freeholder =

Newspaper based in Cornwall, Ontario

- Front page of the June 5, 2020 edition
- Type: Daily newspaper
- Format: Broadsheet
- Owner(s): Postmedia
- Editor: Hugo Rodrigues
- Founded: 1846
- Headquarters: 1150 Montreal Road; Cornwall, Ontario; K6H 1E2
- Circulation: 7,700
- ISSN: 0842-0351
- Website: www.standard-freeholder.com

The Cornwall Standard-Freeholder is a daily newspaper based in Cornwall, Ontario, Canada. It has been in circulation for many years, and continues to be the newspaper with the largest circulation inside the Montreal - Ottawa - Kingston triangle. The newspaper is owned by Postmedia.

== History ==
The Standard-Freeholder is a daily newspaper in Cornwall and the counties of Stormont, Dundas and Glengarry. The Cornwall Standard-Freeholder is one of the oldest newspapers in Canada.

The current newspaper began as two publications, the Freeholder, which was founded by the first premier of Ontario, John Sandfield Macdonald in 1846, and the Standard, founded in 1886.

The two newspapers were amalgamated in 1932 and the first issue was published on April 30 of that year. The Standard-Freeholder became a daily newspaper on April 1, 1941.

It currently publishes print editions Tuesdays through Saturdays, excluding statutory holidays. A complimentary edition is printed and distributed on Thursdays for non-subscribers.

== Present day ==
The Standard-Freeholder remains the only daily newspaper in the triangle between Brockville, Ottawa and Montreal to this day. In 2006, the Standard-Freeholder was nominated for the first time for a National Newspaper Award for a series of articles published the day after an announcement the city's oldest and most prominent employer, Domtar Fine Papers Inc., would be shutting down its paper mill operation for good.

In November 2018, the Standard-Freeholder along with several other daily newspapers in the Postmedia chain had its Monday edition cut, bringing it down to five editions per week instead of six.

== Current editorial staff ==
- Managing editor: Hugo Rodrigues
- Staff reporters: Francis Racine, Todd Hambleton and Joshua Santos

== See also ==
- Cornwall Seaway News
- List of newspapers in Canada
