= Brantford Expositor =

Newspaper published in Brantford, Ontario, Canada

- Type: Daily newspaper
- Format: Broadsheet
- Owner: Postmedia
- Editor: Kim Novak
- Founded: 1852
- Circulation: 15,349 weekdays 16,048 Saturdays (as of 2011)
- Website: www.brantfordexpositor.ca

The Brantford Expositor is an English language newspaper based in Brantford, Ontario and owned by Postmedia.

== History ==
The Expositor has been published continuously in the city of Brantford and County of Brant for over 160 years.

== Present day ==
The Brantford Expositor is published 6 days a week Monday to Saturday, and has a daily paid circulation of 20,000. The paper serves Brantford, as well as Paris, Burford, and the rest of Brant County.

The Brantford Expositor also publishes Your Brant Connection, a free weekly community paper (delivered every Thursday), which has a distribution of 52,500 to all homes in the Brantford and Brant County area.

In 2010, the newspaper moved from 53 Dalhousie Street in downtown Brantford, to a business park at 195 Henry Street but at the current date, April 4, 2022, has no local office. The Newspaper is printed in Hamilton at the Hamilton Spectator

== See also ==
- List of newspapers in Canada
