= The Sudbury Star =

Canadian newspaper in Ontario

- Front page of the May 30, 2020 edition
- Type: Daily newspaper
- Format: Broadsheet
- Owner: Postmedia Network
- Publisher: Andre Grandchamp
- Editor: Don MacDonald
- Founded: 1909
- Headquarters: 888 Regent Street, Suite 103; Sudbury, Ontario; P3E 6C6
- Circulation: 14,934 weekdays 15,423 Saturdays (as of 2011)
- Price: $1.50 CAD + HST
- ISSN: 0839-2544
- Website: www.thesudburystar.com

The Sudbury Star is a Canadian daily regional newspaper published in Sudbury, Ontario. It is owned by the media company, Postmedia. It is the largest daily paper in Northeastern Ontario by circulation.

== History ==
The Sudbury Star began as a daily in January 1909 as the Northern Daily Star, in competition with the city's established daily Sudbury Journal, but it was in immediate financial trouble and folded within just six months. Staff took over ownership of the struggling newspaper, led by foreman William Edge Mason, who then found 10 prominent investors to provide financial backing to the paper. W.E. Mason Equipment was created to take over management of the paper, and by World War I the paper was flourishing and the Sudbury Journal was out of business. In 1922 Mason acquired the North Bay Nugget in North Bay.

In 1935, Mason launched the city's first commercial radio station, CKSO.

In 1948, Mason died and ownership of the paper was taken over by his W.E. Mason Estate. The Nugget was almost immediately sold in an employee buyout, but the Sudbury Star remained under the ownership of Mason's estate until 1950, when J. R. Meakes, Mason's successor as publisher and general manager, bought the paper with co-investors George Miller, Jim Cooper and Bill Plaunt. The same investment group launched CKSO-TV, the city's first television station and the first television station in Canada not owned by the Canadian Broadcasting Corporation, in 1953.

In 1955 the paper was acquired by Thomson Newspapers. Meakes remained as publisher and general manager until his retirement in 1975.

In the early 1960s, the city saw a "newspaper war" between two startup weekly newspapers, the Sudbury Sun and the Star-owned Sudbury Scene. The Sun, a publication of Northland Publishers, was out of business by 1962, and filed a competition lawsuit against the Scene, alleging that the Scene had deliberately undercut the Sun's advertising rates to protect Thomson's monopoly on English-language periodical publication in the city. The federal trade practices commission ruled in Thomson's favour.

The paper was sold to Southam Newspapers in 1996, to Osprey Media in 2001, and to Sun Media in 2007. In 2015 Postmedia Network acquired Sun Media.

In October 2013 the paper moved from its longtime home at 33 MacKenzie Street in Sudbury to new offices at 128 Pine Street. In 2020, the paper moved again, to an office building on Regent Street in the Lily Creek neighbourhood.

The current managing editor of the Sudbury Star is Don MacDonald, who assumed the role in 2014.

On 29 September, 2026, Postmedia Network announced that the Sudbury Star and several other Ontario newspapers would no longer be printed, but would transition to online-only publications. The Star's last printed edition was published in late October 2026.

== Notable staff ==
- David Griffin, journalist, Olympic athlete, and Royal Canadian Air Force officer
- Don Scott, author and journalist

== See also ==
- List of newspapers in Canada
