= Pembroke Daily Observer =

Canadian digital newspaper in Ontario

The Pembroke Daily Observer is a digital newspaper serving the city of Pembroke, Ontario, Canada, and the nearby town of Petawawa. It was founded in 1855 and is now owned by Postmedia.

As a broadsheet daily newspaper, it had a circulation of about 6,000 in recent years. It is the oldest continuous business enterprise in Pembroke. It has gone through many names over the years, including The Bulletin, The Standard, The Standard-Observer, The Pembroke Observer and now The Daily Observer.

On June 26, 2018, owner Postmedia announced that the publication will be discontinued, with its final edition to be published on July 28. The company will continue providing news in the area through its digital presence and the weekly Pembroke News.

== See also ==
- List of newspapers in Canada
