= Simcoe Reformer =

Canadian newspaper in Ontario

The Simcoe Reformer

- Front page of the June 5, 2020 edition
- Type: Daily newspaper
- Format: Tabloid
- Owner: Postmedia
- Editor: Kim Novak
- Founded: 1858
- Language: English
- Headquarters: 365 Bloor Street East Toronto, Ontario, Canada M4W 3L4
- ISSN: 0842-1269
- Website: www.simcoereformer.ca

The Simcoe Reformer is a newspaper circulating in Norfolk County, Ontario and Haldimand County, Ontario, both in Canada. The Reformer is published weekdays.

== History ==
In 1858, Dr William H. Oliver, who had written for and edited a number of periodicals in the early 1800s, established a weekly newspaper called The Erie News in Simcoe. After publishing for three years, the newspaper was sold to William Buckingham in 1861, who renamed it The Norfolk Reformer. Buckingham edited the paper for 18 months under the motto, "The Price of Freedom is Eternal Vigilance". In 1922, the Norfolk Reformer and another newspaper, The Simcoe British Canadian, were purchased by the Pearce Publishing Company, which amalgamated them to create The Simcoe Reformer. Pearce increased the frequency of publication of the newspaper, publishing it twice a week by 1934 and three times a week by 1953. In 1960, the newspaper became an "evening daily newspaper", which it remained as until 1995, when it became a tabloid.

Currently, The Simcoe Reformer has a small comics page with a maximum of four comic strips per day. Issues in the 1980s and 1990s had an entire page dedicated to classic comic strips like Motley's Crew, Between Friends and For Better or For Worse.

== See also ==
- List of newspapers in Canada
