= Timmins Daily Press =

Canadian newspaper in Ontario

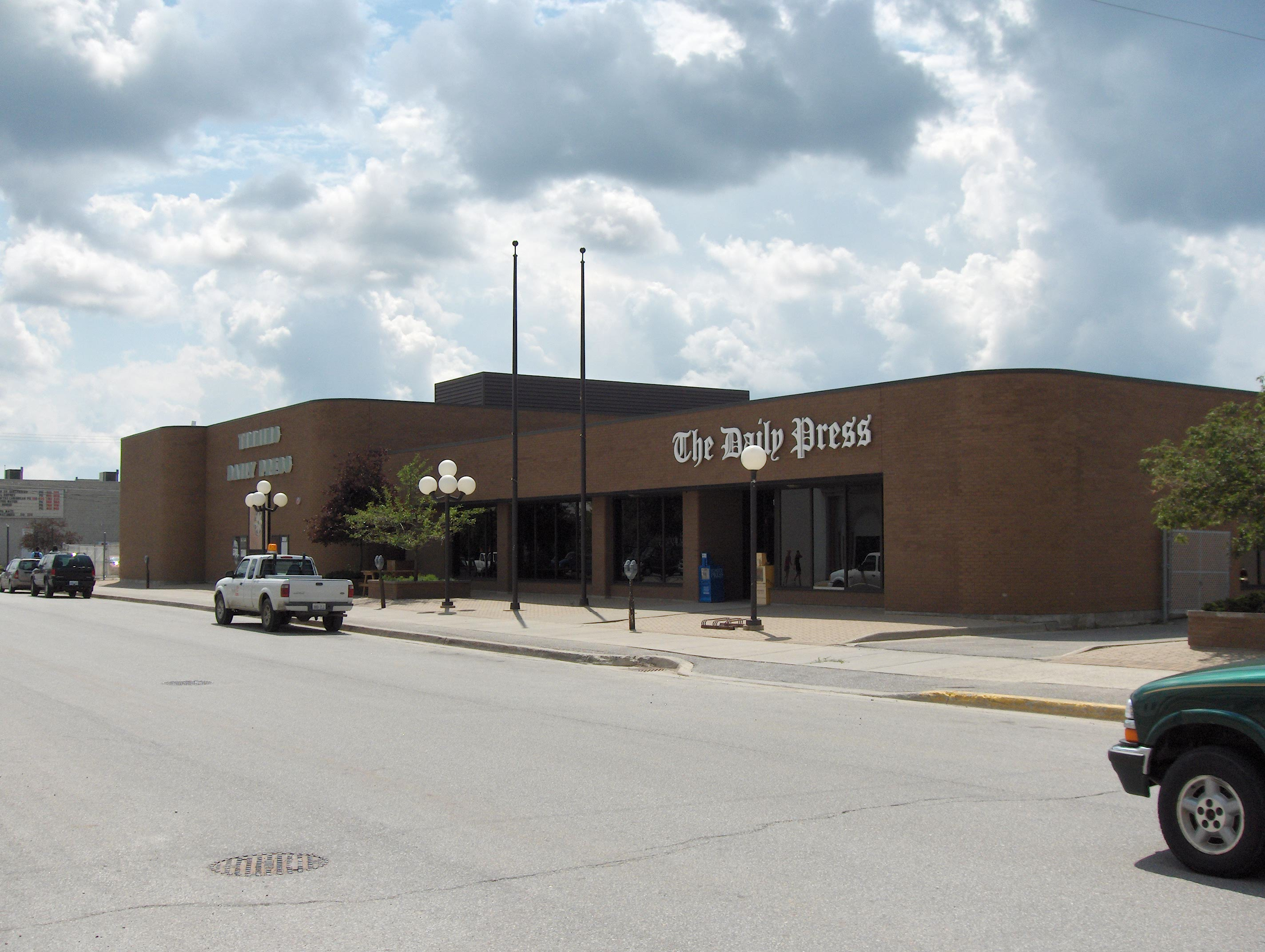
- The Timmins Daily Press Building
- Type: Daily newspaper
- Owner: Postmedia
- Founder: Roy Thomson
- Website: https://www.timminspress.com/

The Timmins Daily Press is a newspaper in Timmins, Ontario, which publishes six days a week. It is notable as the first paper founded by press baron Roy Thomson in the 1930s, who would eventually own more than 200 newspapers including The Times (London). In the 1990s, the paper was sold to Hollinger, a company founded by Noah Timmins, after whom the city of Timmins is named.

The Daily Press is now owned by Postmedia after having been owned by Quebecor and Osprey Media, which bought the Daily Press from Hollinger in 2001. Post Media purchased The Daily Press in a deal that was finalized in April 2015.

The Daily Press had an average daily circulation of 6,001 in the six-month period ending in March 2008, down from 9,522 in September 2005.

On 29 September, 2026, Postmedia announced that the Daily Press and several other Ontario newspapers would no longer be printed, but would transition to online-only publications. The Daily Press' last printed edition was published in late October 2026.

== See also ==
- List of newspapers in Canada
