= Media in Kingston, Ontario =

This is a list of media in Kingston, Ontario.

== Radio ==
In addition to local outlets, radio and television stations from New York state (particularly the Watertown market) are readily available in Kingston. (See also: Radio stations in Watertown) One such station, WLYK in Cape Vincent, New York, promotes itself as a Kingston station — and operates from studios in Kingston under a local management agreement — despite being officially licensed to an American community. The Queen's University campus station, CFRC Radio, is one of the oldest stations in the world, having been founded in 1922. This station served as a commercial outlet until the establishment of CKWS-AM (now CKWS-FM) in 1942. Kingston's two legacy AM frequencies, 960 kHz (CKWS) and 1380 kHz (CKLC) are now dark after both stations moved to the FM band in the late 2000s.

| Frequency | Call sign | Branding | Format | Owner | Notes |
|---|---|---|---|---|---|
| FM 91.9 | CKVI-FM | 91.9 The Cave | High school radio | Kingston Collegiate and Vocational Institute | The station is run by students who are part of the Radio Broadcasting county-wide focus program which is open to any Grade 11, 12, and returning 12th year students in the Limestone District School Board. |
| FM 92.9 | CBBK-FM | CBC Music | Adult contemporary, public radio | Canadian Broadcasting Corporation | Rebroadcaster of CBL-FM (Toronto) |
| FM 93.5 | CKXC-FM | Country 93.5 | Country | Rogers Radio | |
| FM 96.3 | CFMK-FM | 96.3 Big FM | Classic rock | Corus Entertainment | |
| FM 98.3 | CFLY-FM | Fly 98.3 | Hot adult contemporary | My Broadcasting Corporation | |
| FM 98.9 | CKLC-FM | Kingston's New Country 98.9 | Country | My Broadcasting Corporation | (formerly on AM 1380; moved to FM in 2007) |
| FM 99.5 | CJBC-2-FM | Ici Radio-Canada Première | Talk radio, public radio | Canadian Broadcasting Corporation | French-language; rebroadcaster of CJBC (Toronto) |
| FM 100.5 | CKJJ-FM-3 | UCB Radio | Christian radio | United Christian Broadcasters Canada | Rebroadcaster of CKJJ-FM (Belleville) |
| FM 101.3 | CJAI-FM | Island Radio 101.3 FM | Community Radio | Amherst Island Radio Broadcasting, Inc. | Located in Loyalist,_Ontario, its protected contour extends into Kingston. |
| FM 101.9 | CFRC-FM | CFRC 101.9 | Campus radio, community radio | Radio Queen's University | Ownership was transferred from Queen’s University to an independent, not-for-profit body known as Radio Queen’s University to comply with CRTC requirements. |
| FM 102.7 | WLYK-FM | 102.7 Wow FM | Classic hits | Border International Broadcasting (1234567 Corporation) | Studio located in Kingston but transmitter located in Cape Vincent, New York |
| FM 104.3 | CKWS-FM | 104.3 Fresh Radio | Hot adult contemporary | Corus Entertainment | (formerly on AM 960; moved to FM in 2007) |
| FM 105.7 | CIKR-FM | K-Rock 105.7 | Active rock | Rogers Radio | |
| FM 106.3 | CIRJ-FM | | Local information and updates | | Short-range signal information for visitors and residents. Operated by Information Radio. (defunct) |
| FM 107.5 | CBCK-FM | CBC Radio One | Talk radio, public radio | Canadian Broadcasting Corporation | Rebroadcaster of CBO-FM (Ottawa) |

=== FM ===
- 88.1 FM - VF7138 (Kingston)

== Television ==
| OTA channel | Virtual channel (PSIP) | Cogeco | Call sign | Network | Notes |
|---|---|---|---|---|---|
| 2 (VHF) | – | 3 | CIII-TV-2 | Global | Rebroadcaster of CIII-DT (Toronto);^{1} Transmitted from Bancroft |
| 6 (VHF) | – | 6 | CJOH-TV-6 | CTV | Rebroadcaster of CJOH-DT (Ottawa); Transmitted from Deseronto (analog transmitter shutdown on October 9, 2020 - defunct) |
| 11 (VHF) | 11.1 | 10 | CKWS-DT | Global | |
| – | – | 13 | – | TVCogeco | Community channel for Cogeco subscribers |

^{1}Nearest Global signal to Kingston; much of the city gets only a marginal over-the-air signal from CIII-TV-2.

The incumbent terrestrial cable provider in Kingston is Cogeco.

=== Defunct analog TV stations in Kingston ===
- CKWS-TV - channel 11
- CBLFT-TV-14 - channel 32
- CICO-TV-38 - channel 38

== Print ==
- The Heritage
- The Kingston Chronicle & Gazette (historic)
- Kingston This Week
- Kingston Whig-Standard, Canada's oldest daily newspaper, founded in 1834
- The Queen's Journal
- Golden Words

== Internet ==
- City of Kingston
- Visit Kingston
- The Kingston Local, became defunct in 2020 along with 10 other online news outlets.
- Kingstonist
