= The Beacon Herald =

Canadian newspaper in Ontario

- Type: Daily newspaper
- Format: Broadsheet
- Owner: Postmedia
- Publisher: Dave Carter
- Managing editor: Bruce Urquhart
- Founded: 1923; 103 years ago
- Language: English
- Headquarters: 16 Packham Road, Stratford ON
- Circulation: The Beacon Herald and Marketplace combined 25,000
- Price: $1 an issue (at stands)
- ISSN: 0834-4892
- Website: www.stratfordbeaconherald.com

The Beacon Herald (Stratford Beacon-Herald) is a daily newspaper (Monday to Saturday) published in Stratford, Ontario, Canada. The paper serves the area of Perth County, Ontario.

== History ==
The paper was established in 1923 from the merger of two local papers, the Stratford Beacon Weekly (c.1855 and daily after 1887) and Stratford Weekly Herald (c.1863 and daily after 1887).

The paper is the survivor of several other papers in Stratford:

- Stratford Mirror, 1920s to 1940s
- Stratford Times, 1964 to 1976
- Stratford Weekly News, 1979 to 1980

The paper was owned by the Dingman family until it was acquired by Sun Media (Quebecor Media) in 2000 and, in turn, by Postmedia in 2015.

== See also ==
- List of newspapers in Canada
