= The Sun Times (Owen Sound) =

Canadian local newspaper in Ontario

- Front page of the May 30, 2020 edition
- Type: Triweekly newspaper
- Owner: Postmedia
- Founded: 1853
- ISSN: 0839-5152
- Website: www.owensoundsuntimes.com

The Sun Times is a local newspaper that services the Bruce-Grey-Owen Sound area of the Canadian province of Ontario. Its headquarters are in Owen Sound and the newspaper is owned and operated by Postmedia.

== History ==
The Times newspaper was founded in 1853 and The Sun newspaper was founded in 1893; they amalgamated in 1918. Daily editions began in 1922.

Effective January 31, 2023, The Sun Times changed from five-day publication to three days: Tuesday, Thursday and Saturday. It publishes an e-edition on the same days.

Jennifer Kho has held the position of executive editor since June 2022.

== See also ==
- List of newspapers in Canada
