= List of defunct newspapers of Canada =

≈ This is a list of defunct newspapers of Canada, organized alphabetically by province.

Newspaper	Prov.	City/region	Commence Publication	Ceased Publication
Acme News	AB	Acme	1910	1914
Acme Sentinel	AB	Acme	1914	1970
Acme Telegram-Tribune	AB	Acme	1914	1914
Acme Valley News	AB	Acme	1954	1955
Airdrie and District Echo	AB	Airdrie	1976	1982
Airdrie Echo	AB	Airdrie	?	2023
Airdrie News	AB	Airdrie	1908	1909
Alliance Enterprise	AB	Alliance	1939	1982
Alliance Times	AB	Alliance	1916	1939
Athabasca Advance	AB	Athabasca	1956	1957
Athabasca Advocate	AB	Athabasca	?	2020
Athabasca Call	AB	Athabasca	1976	1977
Athabasca Echo	AB	Athabasca	1928	1986
Athabasca Herald	AB	Athabasca	1816	1921
Athabasca Times	AB	Athabasca	1913	1914
Northern News	AB	Athabasca	1909	1915
Northern Light	AB	Athabasca Landing	1908	1908
Banff Crag & Canyon	AB	Banff	1900	2013
Banff News	AB	Banff	1930	1930
Rocky Mountain Courier	AB	Banff	1915	1928
Barrhead Leader	AB	Barrhead	?	2020
Barrhead News	AB	Barrhead	1928	1931
Barrhead Star	AB	Barrhead	1974	1975
Beiseker Times	AB	Beiseker	1949	1953
Blairmore Enterprise	AB	Blairmore	1929	1945
Blairmore Enterprise and Graphic	AB	Blairmore	1946	1947
Blairmore Graphic	AB	Blairmore	1948	1948
The Pass Herald	AB	Blairmore	1978	1984
The Pass Promoter	AB	Blairmore	1978	1984
Bonnyville Nouvelle	AB	Bonnyville	?	2020
Bonnyville Tribune	AB	Bonnyville	1947	1968
Bow Valley Crag & Canyon	AB	Bow Valley	?	2023
Brooks Banner	AB	Brooks	1910	1912
24 Hours Calgary	AB	Calgary	?	?
Alberta Farmer and Calgary Weekly Herald	AB	Calgary	1919	1932
Alberta Non-Partisan	AB	Calgary	1917	1919
Albertan	AB	Calgary	1910	1974
Bond of Brotherhood	AB	Calgary	1903	1904
Calgary Canadian	AB	Calgary	1918	1918
Calgary Eye Opener	AB	Calgary	1902	1923
Calgary Nutcracker	AB	Calgary	1916	1917
Calgary Optimist	AB	Calgary	1909	1910
Calgary Rebel	AB	Calgary	1937	1938
Calgary RushHour	AB	Calgary	2007	2008
Calgary Searchlight	AB	Calgary	1919	1920
Calgary Tribune	AB	Calgary	1885	1903
Calgary Weekly Herald	AB	Calgary	1883	1901
Calgary Western Independent	AB	Calgary	1919	1920
Calgary Westerner	AB	Calgary	1923	1928
Der Deutsch Canadier	AB	Calgary	1909	1914
Deutsch Canadischer Farmer	AB	Calgary	1909	1912
Diario Hispano	AB	Calgary	1982	?
Fast Forward Weekly	AB	Calgary	1995	2015
Latin Report	AB	Calgary	1976	1978
Lo Stivale	AB	Calgary	1984	?
The Jewish Star	AB	Calgary	1980	1990
StarMetro Calgary	AB	Calgary	2000	2019
Swerve	AB	Calgary	2018	2019
United Farmer	AB	Calgary	1922	1935
Camrose Canadian	AB	Camrose	1908	2018
Canmore Leader	AB	Canmore	1983	2013
Cardston Alberta Star	AB	Cardston	1907	1911
Cardston Globe	AB	Cardston	1911	1921
Cardston News	AB	Cardston	1959	1966
Cardston Record	AB	Cardston	1898	1899
Cardston Review	AB	Cardston	1921	1922
Cardston Unlimited	AB	Cardston	1967	1974
Temple City Tribune	AB	Cardston	1964	1965
Westwind News	AB	Cardston	1975	1979
Carstairs Journal	AB	Carstairs	1906	1922
Carstairs News	AB	Carstairs	1924	1926
Cochrane Times-Post	AB	Cochrane	1910	2023
Cold Lake Sun	AB	Cold Lake	?	2023
Lakeland Regional	AB	Cold Lake	?	2018
Coleman Bulletin	AB	Coleman	1913	1918
Coleman Journal	AB	Coleman	1925	1972
Coleman Miner	AB	Coleman	1908	1911
Coleman Review	AB	Coleman	1972	1981
Consort Enterprise	AB	Consort	1912	1982
Coronation Review	AB	Coronation	1911	1998
Chronicle and Lundbreck Advertiser	AB	Cowley	1909	1910
Crowsnest Pass Promoter	AB	Crowsnest Pass	?	2013
Delburne Times	AB	Delburne	1912	1967
Drayton Valley Tribune	AB	Drayton Valley	1954	1958
Drayton Valley Western Review	AB	Drayton Valley	1965	2023
24 Hours Edmonton	AB	Edmonton	?	?
Alberta Farm Journal and Edmonton Journal Weekly	AB	Edmonton	1925	1932
Alberta Deutsche Zeitung	AB	Edmonton	1910	1913
Alberta Herold	AB	Edmonton	1903	1915
Alberta Illustrated News	AB	Edmonton	1913	1913
Asian Vision	AB	Edmonton	2012	?
Courier de l'Ouest	AB	Edmonton	1907	1919
Despertar	AB	Edmonton	1972	?
Edmonton Bulletin	AB	Edmonton	1880	1951
Edmonton Capital	AB	Edmonton	1910	1914
Edmonton Free Press	AB	Edmonton	1919	1920
Edmonton Journal Farm Weekly	AB	Edmonton	1924	1925
Edmonton Mirror	AB	Edmonton	1912	1912
Edmonton News	AB	Edmonton	1913	1959
Edmonton Official Gazette	AB	Edmonton	1914	1914
Edmonton RushHour	AB	Edmonton	2007	2008
Edmonton Saturday Mirror	AB	Edmonton	1912	1913
Edmonton Saturday News	AB	Edmonton	1905	1912
Edmonton Soviet	AB	Edmonton	1919	1919
Edmonton Spotlight	AB	Edmonton	1949	1954
Edmonton Star	AB	Edmonton	1971	1974
Edmonton Star and Alberta Farm Life	AB	Edmonton	1969	1971
Edmonton Statesman	AB	Edmonton	1917	1919
Edmonton Suburban Times	AB	Edmonton	1958	1964
Franco Albertain	AB	Edmonton	1967	1989
Jornal Portugese	AB	Edmonton	?	1981
La Survivance	AB	Edmonton	1928	1967
Le Progres Albertain	AB	Edmonton	1914	1915
L'Ouest Canadien	AB	Edmonton	1898	1900
People's Weekly	AB	Edmonton	1937	1943
StarMetro Edmonton	AB	Edmonton	2000	2019
Vietnam Thoi Bao	AB	Edmonton	1990	?
VUE Weekly	AB	Edmonton	1995	2018
Weekly Town Topics	AB	Edmonton	1917	1917
Western Catholic Reporter	AB	Edmonton	1921	1979
Western Weekly	AB	Edmonton	1915	1915
Edson Critic	AB	Edson	1913	1913
Edson District Call	AB	Edson	1921	1922
Edson Enterprise	AB	Edson	1920	1920
Edson Herald	AB	Edson	1917	1917
Edson Leader	AB	Edson	1911	2020
Edson News	AB	Edson	1918	1918
Edson-Jasper Signal	AB	Edson	1928	1943
Western Signal	AB	Edson	1946	1960
Western Star	AB	Edson	1913	1913
Elk Point Review	AB	Elk Point	?	2020
Fairview Post	AB	Fairview	1940	1982
Northern Review	AB	Fairview	1929	1933
Fort MacLeod Advertiser	AB	Fort MacLeod	1909	1913
Fort MacLeod Advocate and Southern Alberta Advertiser	AB	Fort MacLeod	1907	1909
Fort MacLeod Buzzer	AB	Fort MacLeod	1911	1912
Fort MacLeod News	AB	Fort MacLeod	1916	1920
Fort MacLeod Spectator	AB	Fort MacLeod	1912	1916
Fort MacLeod Times	AB	Fort MacLeod	1920	1930
Fort MacLeod Weekly Chronicle	AB	Fort MacLeod	1908	1909
Fort McMurray Connect	AB	Fort McMurray	?	2016
Fort McMurray Today	AB	Fort McMurray	1974	2023
Fort Saskatchewan Chronicle	AB	Fort Saskatchewan	1910	1911
Fort Saskatchewan Conservator	AB	Fort Saskatchewan	1913	1920
Fort Saskatchewan Recorder	AB	Fort Saskatchewan	1911	1912
Fort Saskatchewan Reporter	AB	Fort Saskatchewan	1903	1909
Fort Saskatchewan Star	AB	Fort Saskatchewan	1974	1977
The Northern Pioneer	AB	Fort Vermillion	?	2015
Frank Paper	AB	Frank	1907	1909
Frank Vindicator	AB	Frank	1910	1913
Grande Prairie Booster	AB	Grande Prairie	1976	1981
Grande Prairie Daily Herald-Tribune	AB	Grande Prairie	1913	2021
Grande Prairie Frontier Signal	AB	Grande Prairie	1914	1916
Grande Prairie Northern Tribune	AB	Grande Prairie	1932	1939
Grande Prairie This Week	AB	Grande Prairie	1981	1983
Grimshaw Northerner	AB	Grimshaw	1962	1962
Grimshaw Spotlight	AB	Grimshaw	1956	1960
Grimshaw Voyager	AB	Grimshaw	1952	1953
Hanna Herald	AB	Hanna	?	2023
The Echo	AB	High Level	?	2015
Hinton Parklander	AB	Hinton	1955	2020
Hythe Headliner	AB	Hythe	1973	2014
Innisfail Free Lance	AB	Innisfail	1902	1907
Innisfail Province	AB	Innisfail	1906	2020
Irma Times	AB	Irma	1917	1969
Jasper Booster	AB	Jasper	1963	2009
Jasper Gateway	AB	Jasper	1966	1969
Jasper Local	AB	Jasper	2013	2021
Jasper Signal	AB	Jasper	1927	1928
Jasper Totem	AB	Jasper	1963	1967
Lac La Biche Post	AB	Lac La Biche	?	2020
Lacombe Advertiser	AB	Lacombe	1907	1909
Lacombe Globe	AB	Lacombe	1901	2020
Lacombe Guardian	AB	Lacombe	1913	1916
Lacombe Western Globe	AB	Lacombe	1907	1938
Leduc County Market	AB	Leduc	?	2023
Lethbridge News	AB	Lethbridge	1885	1912
Lethbridge Telegram	AB	Lethbridge	1914	1919
Lloydminster Times	AB	Lloydminster	1907	1942
Medicine Hat Call	AB	Medicine Hat	1913	1913
Medicine Hat Morning Times	AB	Medicine Hat	1911	1916
Medicine Hat Times	AB	Medicine Hat	1889	1894
Monitor News	AB	Monitor	1916	1922
Le Progres	AB	Morinville	1909	1913
Le Progress Albertain	AB	Morinville	1913	1914
The Morinville Redwater Town and Country Examiner	AB	Morinville	2008	2009
Okotoks Review	AB	Okotoks	1905	1905
Okotoks Times and Western Star	AB	Okotoks	1903	1903
Peace River Northern Gazette	AB	Peace River	1932	1939
Peace River Pilot	AB	Peace River	1910	1910
Peace River Record	AB	Peace River	1914	1943
Peace River Standard	AB	Peace River	1917	1922
Pembina News Advertiser	AB	Pembina	1956	1965
Pincher Creek Echo	AB	Pincher Creek	1900	2023
Rocky Mountain Echo	AB	Pincher Creek	1903	1906
Red Deer Express	AB	Red Deer	?	2019
Red Deer News	AB	Red Deer	1906	1926
Redcliff Review	AB	Redcliff	1910	1940
Rocky Mountain House Capital	AB	Rocky Mountain House	1918	1918
Rocky Mountain House Echo	AB	Rocky Mountain House	1911	1912
Rocky Mountain House Gazette	AB	Rocky Mountain House	1921	1923
Rocky Mountain House Guide	AB	Rocky Mountain House	1913	1917
Sedgewick Sentinel	AB	Sedgewick	1908	1929
Sherwood Park Herald	AB	Sherwood Park	1963	1968
Sherwood Park Star	AB	Sherwood Park	1974	1977
Smoky Lake Signal	AB	Smoky Lake	1979	2021
St. Albert Star	AB	St. Albert	1912	1914
The Independent Reformer	AB	St. Paul	1945	1945
St. Paul Canadian	AB	St. Paul	1934	1935
St. Paul Journal	AB	St. Paul	?	2020
St. Paul Star	AB	St. Paul	1920	1922
Stettler Actioneer	AB	Stettler	1977	1981
Eastern Central Alberta Review	AB	Stettler	1998	2025
Strathmore Standard	AB	Strathmore	?	2018
Stony Plain Advertiser	AB	Stony Plain	1909	1913
Stony Plain Mirror	AB	Stony Plain	1915	1916
Stony Plain Sun	AB	Stony Plain	1921	1967
Alberta Plaindealer	AB	Strathcona	1896	1899
South Edmonton News	AB	Strathcona	1908	1909
Strathcona Chronicle	AB	Strathcona	1907	1908
Strathcona Evening Chronicle	AB	Strathcona	1907	1912
Strathcona Plaindealer	AB	Strathcona	1894	1896
Strathmore Standard	AB	Strathmore	1909	1948
Sundre Round-Up	AB	Sundre	?	2020
Sylvan Lake World	AB	Sylvan Lake	1922	1926
Tofield Advertiser	AB	Tofield	1917	1918
Ryley Times	AB	Tofield	1946	1967
Tofield Standard	AB	Tofield	1907	1917
Valleyview Valley Views	AB	Valleyview	?	2015
Vegreville Mirror	AB	Vegreville	1961	1965
Vegreville Observer	AB	Vegreville	1908	2015
Vermilion Signal	AB	Vermilion	1906	1908
Vermilion Standard	AB	Vermilion	?	2023
Viking News	AB	Viking	1913	1979
Westlock News	AB	Westlock	?	2020
Wetaskiwin Free Press	AB	Wetaskiwin	1924	1925
Wetaskiwin Times	AB	Wetaskiwin	1901	1986
Whitecourt Star	AB	Whitecourt	1961	2023
Youngstown Plaindealer	AB	Youngstown	1913	1936
100 Miles House Advisor	BC	100 Mile House	?	2010
Abbotsford Times	BC	Abbotsford	?	2013
Okanagan Advertiser	BC	Armstrong	1902	2023
Burnaby News Leader	BC	Burnaby	1989	2015
Burnaby Now	BC	Burnaby	1983	2023
Campbell River Islander-Courier	BC	Campbell River	?	2015
Chetwynd Echo-Pioneer	BC	Chetwynd	1959	2016
Chilliwack Times	BC	Chilliwack	1985	2016
Comox Valley Daily	BC	Comox	2011	2013
Coquitlam Now	BC	Coquitlam	1984	2016
The Mirror	BC	Dawson Creek	1930	2023
Northeast News	BC	Dawson Creek	2004	2016
South Delta Leader	BC	Delta	?	2014
Cowichan Leader	BC	Duncan	1905	2015
Duncan Free Press	BC	Duncan	?	2017
Fort Nelson News	BC	Fort Nelson	1959	2023
Alaska Highway News	BC	Fort St. John	1943	2023
Fraser Valley Daily	BC	Fraser Valley	?	2013
Grand Forks Boundary Bulletin	BC	Grand Forks	?	?
Boundary Creek Times	BC	Greenwood	1896	2022
Kamloops Daily News	BC	Kamloops	1937	2014
Kamloops This Week	BC	Kamloops	1988	2023
Golden Ears Daily	BC	Langley	?	2013
Lillooet-Bridge River News	BC	Lillooet	?	2020
Nanaimo Daily News	BC	Nanaimo	1874	2016
Nanaimo Harbour City Star	BC	Nanaimo	?	2015
Nelson Daily News	BC	Nelson	1902	2010
New Westminster News Leader	BC	New Westminster	?	2015
New Westminster Record	BC	New Westminster	?	2023
The Citizen	BC	North Vancouver (city)	?	?
The North Shore Outlook	BC	North Vancouver (city)	?	2014
Oliver Chronicle	BC	Oliver	?	2020
Osoyoos Times	BC	Osoyoos	1947	2020
Oceanside Star	BC	Parksville	?	2015
Penticton Western News	BC	Penticton	?	2011
Alberni Valley Times	BC	Port Alberni	1967	2015
Tri-City News	BC	Port Coquitlam	1985	2023
Prince George Free Press	BC	Prince George	1994	2015
Prince Rupert Daily News	BC	Prince Rupert	1911	2010
Similkameen News Leader	BC	Princeton	1997	2016
Quesnel Advisor	BC	Quesnel	?	2010
Richmond News	BC	Richmond	1977	2023
Richmond Review	BC	Richmond	1932	2015
The Local Weekly	BC	Sechelt	?	2021
Aika	BC	Sointula	1901	1904
Squamish Today	BC	Squamish	?	2008
Tumbler Ridge News	BC	Tumbler Ridge	1997	2017
24 Hours Vancouver	BC	Vancouver	2003	2017
Canada Morning Post	BC	Vancouver	1926	1927
Canada Tribunen	BC	Vancouver	1912	1919
Chinese Express	BC	Vancouver	1971	1981
Chinese Times	BC	Vancouver	1914	1992
Chong Shing Yit Pao	BC	Vancouver	1955	?
Contacto Directo	BC	Vancouver	1992	?
The New Republic (Hsin Kuo Min Pao)	BC	Vancouver	1911	1989
Jih Hsin Pao	BC	Vancouver	1903	1911
Pazifische Rundschau	BC	Vancouver	1965	2003
The Republic	BC	Vancouver	2000	2009
StarMetro Vancouver	BC	Vancouver	2000	2019
Svenska Vancouver Posten	BC	Vancouver	1910	1914
The Vancouver Courier	BC	Vancouver	1908	2020
The Vancouver Daily World	BC	Vancouver	1888	1924
Terminal City Weekly	BC	Vancouver	?	?
Westender	BC	Vancouver	?	2017
World Journal Canada	BC	Vancouver	1976	2016
Xtra! Vancouver	BC	Vancouver	1993	2015
The Islander	BC	Victoria	1952	?
Victoria News Daily	BC	Victoria	?	2013
Whistler Answer	BC	Whistler	1977	1995
Whistler Today	BC	Whistler	2006	2008
Peace Arch News	BC	White Rock	1976	2014
Die Kleine Zeitung mit Herz	BC	Williams Lake	2005	2013
The River Valley Echo	MB	Altona	?	2020
The Beausejour Review	MB	Beausejour	?	2013
Westman Journal	MB	Brandon	2012	2019
The Valley Leader	MB	Carman	?	2020
Southern Manitoba Review	MB	Cartwright	1899	2021
Deloraine Times & Star	MB	Deloraine	?	2020
Flin Flon Daily Miner	MB	Flin Flon	1931	1966
Baldur	MB	Gimli	1903	1910
Bergmálið	MB	Gimli	1897	1901
Gimlungur	MB	Gimli	1910	1914
Heimilisvinurinn	MB	Gimli	1910	1911
The Interlake Spectator	MB	Gimli	1972	2020
Volksbote	MB	Giroux	1913	1915
The Exponent	MB	Grandview	1900	2017
Der Rheinländer	MB	Gretna	1908	1908
The Lac du Bonnet Leader	MB	Lac du Bonnet	?	2013
Melita New Era	MB	Melita	?	2020
Morden Times	MB	Morden	?	2020
Reston Recorder	MB	Reston	?	2020
Framfari	MB	Riverton	1887	1890
Selkirk Journal	MB	Selkirk	?	2020
Souris Plaindealer	MB	Souris	?	2020
Die Post	MB	Steinbach	1915	1966
Stonewall Argus	MB	Stonewall	?	2020
Thompson Citizen	MB	Thompson	1960	2025
Winkler Times	MB	Winkler	?	2020
The Prairie Farmer	MB	Winkler	?	2020
Baldursbrá	MB	Winnipeg	1934	1940
Canada Härold	MB	Winnipeg	1914	1915
Canada Posten	MB	Winnipeg	1904	1952
Canada Tidningen	MB	Winnipeg	1933	1970
Canadian Western Jewish Times	MB	Winnipeg	1914	?
Den Skandinaviske Canadiensaren	MB	Winnipeg	1887	1895
Der Bote	MB	Winnipeg	1924	2008
Deutsche Arbeiter Zeitung	MB	Winnipeg	1930	1937
Deutsche Zeitung für Canada	MB	Winnipeg	1935	1939
Dominion Skandinav	MB	Winnipeg	1927	1931
Heimskringla	MB	Winnipeg	1886	1959
Heimskringla Og Öldin	MB	Winnipeg	1891	1893
Hrvatski Glas	MB	Winnipeg	1932	1977
Kanada Kurier	MB	Winnipeg	1889	2003
Kanadietis	MB	Winnipeg	1913	1914
Kanadyĭskyĭ Farmer	MB	Winnipeg	1903	1978
Kirken Og Hjemmet	MB	Winnipeg	1930	1937
Leifur	MB	Winnipeg	1883	1886
Lögberg	MB	Winnipeg	1888	1959
Manitoba Courier	MB	Winnipeg	1961	1969
Manitoba Courier – Nordwestern	MB	Winnipeg	1970	1978
Mennonitische Rundschau	MB	Winnipeg	1878	2007
Metro Winnipeg	MB	Winnipeg	2011	2017
Nordwestern	MB	Winnipeg	1889	1969
Norrora	MB	Winnipeg	1910	1970
O Mundial	MB	Winnipeg	1972	1976
Saga	MB	Winnipeg	1925	1931
Saint Peters Bote	MB	Winnipeg	1904	1947
San Min Yit Pao	MB	Winnipeg	1937	1945
Sions Väktaren	MB	Winnipeg	1892	1894
Svenska Canada Tidningen	MB	Winnipeg	1907	1932
Tuttugasta öldin	MB	Winnipeg	1909	1911
Väktaren	MB	Winnipeg	1894	1895
Voröld	MB	Winnipeg	1918	1920
Vor Flyvende	MB	Winnipeg	1917	1918
Welt-Post und der Staats-Anzeiger	MB	Winnipeg	1971	1976
West Canada	MB	Winnipeg	1907	1918
Winnipeg Telegram	MB	Winnipeg	1898	1920
Winnipeg Tribune	MB	Winnipeg	1890	1980
Le Madawaska	NB	Edmundston	1913	2018
La République	NB	Edmundston	?	2015
The Weekly Press	NB	Enfield	?	2020
The Laker	NB	Fall River	?	2020
L'Étoile Cataracte	NB	Grand Falls	?	2015
L'Étoile Nord-Ouest	NB	Grand Falls	2015	2018
Le Matin	NB	Moncton	1986	1988
Here Magazine	NB	Saint John	?	2014
Nova Scotia Intelligencer	NB	Saint John	1783	1784
The Royal Gazette	NB	Saint John	1785	1814
The Royal St. John Gazette	NB	Saint John	1783	1784
St. John Advertiser	NB	Saint John	1785	1814
The Saint-John Gazette	NB	Saint John	1786	1709
The Saint John Gazette	NB	Saint John	1803	1807
The Time; or True Briton	NB	Saint John	1808	1810
Carleton Free Press	NB	Woodstock	2007	2008
The Compass	NL	Carbonear	?	2020
The Gulf News	NL	Channel-Port aux Basques	?	2020
The Packet	NL	Clarenville	?	2020
The Western Star	NL	Corner Brook	?	2020
The Beacon	NL	Gander	?	2018
The Advertiser	NL	Grand Falls-Windsor	?	2018
The Labrador Voice	NL	Happy Valley-Goose Bay	?	2020
The Coaster	NL	Harbour Breton	?	2014
The Pilot	NL	Lewisporte	?	2018
The Southern Gazette	NL	Marystown	?	2020
The Charter	NL	Placentia	1997	2013
Wreckhouse Weekly	NL	Port aux Basque	2020	2024
The Nor'Wester	NL	Springdale	?	2018
The Northern Pen	NL	St. Anthony	?	2020
The Central Voice	NL	St. John's	?	2020
The Memorial Times	NL	St. John's	1936	1947
The Scope	NL	St. John's	2006	2013
The Georgian	NL	Stephenville	?	2014
The Citizen	NS	Amherst	?	2011
Amherst News	NS	Amherst	?	2020
The Casket	NS	Antigonish	?	2020
Acadian Recorder	NS	Halifax	1813	1930
Der hochdeutsche neu-schottländische Calender	NS	Halifax	1787	1796
Die Welt, und die Neuschottlaendische Correspondenz	NS	Halifax	1788	1789
Halifax Gazette	NS	Halifax	1752	1867
Novascotian	NS	Halifax	1824	1920
The Coast	NS	Halifax	1993	2020
The Daily News	NS	Halifax	1974	2008
The 4th Estate	NS	Halifax	?	?
Local Xpress	NS	Halifax	2016	2017
StarMetro Halifax	NS	Halifax	2000	2019
Annapolis Valley Register	NS	Kentville	?	2020
South Shore Breaker	NS	Liverpool	?	2020
The Clarion	NS	New Glasgow	1946	1956
The News	NS	New Glasgow	1911	2020
Oxford Journal	NS	Oxford	1900	2015
The Record	NS	Parrsboro	?	2011
Sackville Tribune-Post	NS	Sackville	1870	2021
An Solus Iùli	NS	Sydney	1925	1927
Cape Breton Star	NS	Sydney	2014	2016
Mac-Talla	NS	Sydney	1892	1904
Nova Scotia Gleaner	NS	Sydney	1929	1929
Truro Daily News	NS	Truro	1891	2020
Valley Today	NS	Windsor	2006	2007
Valley Journal Advertiser	NS	Windsor	1867	2020
Tri-Valley Vanguard	NS	Yarmouth	?	2020
Dehcho Drum	NT	Fort Simpson	1994	2017
Northern Journal	NT	Fort Smith	1977	2016
Inuvik Drum	NT	Inuvik	1966	2025
Acton Free Press	ON	Acton	1875	1984
Glengarry News	ON	Alexandria	1892	2023
Alliston Herald	ON	Alliston	1870	2023
Almaguin News	ON	Almaguin	?	2023
Ajax News Advertiser	ON	Ajax	?	2023
Amherstburg Echo	ON	Amherstburg	1874	2012
Gore Gazette	ON	Ancaster	?	?
Aurora Banner	ON	Aurora	1853	2023
Arnprior Chronicle-Guide	ON	Arnprior	1871	2023
West Carleton Review	ON	Arnprior	?	2017
Arthur Enterprise News	ON	Arthur	1862	2019
Barrie Advance	ON	Barrie	1847	2023
Barrie Examiner	ON	Barrie	1864	2017
West Niagara News	ON	Beamsville	?	2012
Belleville News	ON	Belleville	?	2017
Bowmanville Merchant	ON	Bowmanville	1869	1884
Canadian Statesman	ON	Bowmanville	1854	2008
Bracebridge Examiner	ON	Bracebridge	1977	2023
The Muskokan	ON	Bracebridge	?	2023
Muskoka Sun	ON	Bracebridge	1970	2023
Bradford West Gwillimbury Times	ON	Bradford	1991	2017
Bradford West Gwillimbury Topic	ON	Bradford	?	2023
Brampton Guardian	ON	Brampton	1964	2023
Brampton Times	ON	Brampton	?	1985
The Bramptonian	ON	Brampton	1984	1984
Brant News	ON	Brantford	?	2018
Brighton Independent	ON	Brighton	?	2023
Almaguin News	ON	Burk's Falls	?	2023
De Nederlandse Courant	ON	Burlington	1953	2018
Burlington Post	ON	Burlington	1965	2023
Caledon Enterprise	ON	Caledon	1888	2023
The Caledon Underground	ON	Caledon	2010	2010
Caledonia Regional News This Week	ON	Caledonia	?	2012
Grand River Sachem	ON	Caledonia	1853	2023
Cambridge Reporter	ON	Cambridge	1846	2003
Cambridge Times	ON	Cambridge	1980	?
Brock Citizen	ON	Cannington	1996	2023
Carleton Place-Almonte Canadian Gazette	ON	Carleton Place	?	2023
Centre Hastings News	ON	Centre Hastings	?	2018
Provincial Freeman	ON	Chatham	1853	1857
Clarington This Week	ON	Clarington	?	2023
Northumberland News	ON	Cobourg	1991	2023
Northumberland Today	ON	Cobourg	1831	2017
Collingwood Connection	ON	Collingwood	1990	2023
Collingwood Enterprise-Bulletin	ON	Collingwood	?	2017
The Delhi News-Record	ON	Delhi	?	2020
Dryden Observer	ON	Dryden	1897	2019
Dumfries Courier	ON	Dumfries	1844	1847
Dumfries Reformer	ON	Dumfries	1847	?
Dunnville Chronicle	ON	Dunnville	?	2012
Eganville Leader	ON	Eganville	1902	2026
Elliot Lake Standard	ON	Elliot Lake	1880	2026
Elmira Anzeiger	ON	Elmira	1870	1882
Elmira Independent	ON	Elmira	1974	2015
La Nouvelle d'Embrun	ON	Embrun	?	2012
Erin Advocate	ON	Erin	1880	2023
Mid-North Monitor	ON	Espanola	1978	2026
Lakeshore News	ON	Essex	?	2020
Exeter Times-Advocate	ON	Exeter	1873	2018
Fergus-Elora News Express	ON	Fergus	?	2016
Fort Erie Times	ON	Fort Erie	?	2018
Frontenac Gazette	ON	Frontenac	?	2018
Galt Reporter	ON	Galt	1846	1973
Georgetown Herald	ON	Georgetown	1866	1992
Georgina Advocate	ON	Georgina	1961	2023
Lakeshore Advance	ON	Grand Bend	1880	2018
Gravenhurst Banner	ON	Gravenhurst	1886	2023
Der Wächter am Saugeen / Canada National-Zeitung	ON	Grey Country	1868	1892
Grimsby Lincoln Independent	ON	Grimsby	1997	2023
Guelph Mercury	ON	Guelph	1853	2016
Guelph Mercury Tribune	ON	Guelph	2016	2023
Guelph Tribune	ON	Guelph	1984	2016
Ancaster News	ON	Hamilton	?	2023
Canadische Volkszeitung	ON	Hamilton	1872	1876
Dundas Star News	ON	Hamilton	1883	2023
Flamborough Review	ON	Hamilton	1918	2023
Glanbrook Gazette	ON	Hamilton	1996	2023
Hamilton Mountain News	ON	Hamilton	1968	2023
Stoney Creek News	ON	Hamilton	1948	2023
Huntsville Forester	ON	Huntsville	1877	2023
Ingersoll Times	ON	Ingersoll	?	2018
Innisfil Journal	ON	Innisfil	2007	2023
Innisfil Examiner	ON	Innisfil	?	2018
Kanata Kourier-Standard	ON	Kanata	1983	2018
Kapuskasing Times	ON	Kapuskasing	?	2018
La Presse communtaire	ON	Kapuskasing	?	2019
Kawartha Lakes This Week	ON	Kawartha Lakes	1977	2023
Kemptville Advance	ON	Kemptville	1881	2023
King Connection	ON	King	2013	2023
Kingsville Reporter	ON	Kingsville	1873	2020
Kingston Chronicle & Gazette	ON	Kingston	1833	1847
Kingston News-Standard	ON	Kingston	1839	1925
Kingston Heritage	ON	Kingston	?	2018
Northern News	ON	Kirkland Lake	1922	2018
Berlin Daily News	ON	Kitchener	1878	1897
Blaue Seiten Kanada	ON	Kitchener	2004	?
Das Berliner Journal	ON	Kitchener	1859	1918
Das Wochenblatt	ON	Kitchener	1878	1878
Der Deutsche Canadier	ON	Kitchener	1841	1865
LaSalle Post	ON	La Salle	?	2020
LaSalle Silhouette	ON	La Salle	?	2011
Leamington Post	ON	Leamington	1874	2012
Lindsay Daily Post	ON	Lindsay	1861	2013
The Dawn of Tomorrow	ON	London	1923	2013
The Farmer's Sun	ON	London	1892	1934
Metro London	ON	London	2011	2018
Our London	ON	London	?	2018
Manitouwadge Echo	ON	Manitouwadge	?	2016
Markdale Standard	ON	Markdale	1880	2012
Markham Economist and Sun	ON	Markham	1856	2023
Midland Free Press	ON	Midland	1896	2013
Midland Penetanguishene Mirror	ON	Midland	1991	2023
Milton Canadian Champion	ON	Milton	1860	2023
Mississauga News	ON	Mississauga	1965	2023
Sawa Rbena	ON	Mississauga	2006	?
Mount Forest Confederate	ON	Mount Forest	1867	2019
Napanee Guide	ON	Napanee	?	2020
Canadisches Volksblatt	ON	New Hamburg	1859	1908
Der Neu-Hamburger Neutrale	ON	New Hamburg	1855	1908
Hamburger Beobachter	ON	New Hamburg	1852	1855
New Hamburg Independent	ON	New Hamburg	1878	2023
Newmarket Era	ON	Newmarket	1852	2023
Niagara This Week	ON	Niagara Falls	?	2023
Niagara-on-the-Lake Advance	ON	Niagara-on-the-Lake	?	2018
Niagara-on-the-Lake Local	ON	Niagara-on-the-Lake	2019	2024
Upper Canada Guardian	ON	Niagara-on-the-Lake	1807	1812
Welland Deutscher Telegraph	ON	Niagara-on-the-Lake	1885	1886
North Bay Nipissing News	ON	North Bay	?	2015
North Bay Nugget	ON	North Bay	1907	2026
Norfolk News	ON	Norfolk	?	2018
Norwich Gazette	ON	Norwich	?	2018
News4Kids	ON	Oakville	2002	2007
Oakville Beaver	ON	Oakville	?	2023
Orangeville Banner	ON	Orangeville	1893	2023
Orillia Packet & Times	ON	Orillia	?	2017
Orillia Today	ON	Orillia	?	2023
Oshawa This Week	ON	Oshawa	?	2023
24 Hours Ottawa	ON	Ottawa	2003	2017
Capital City News	ON	Ottawa	2012	2012
Capital News	ON	Ottawa	?	2018
Capital Xtra!	ON	Ottawa	1993	2015
Chinese Canadian Community News	ON	Ottawa	1979	1987
Das Ottawa Echo	ON	Ottawa	1893	?
L'Express	ON	Ottawa	?	2015
GO Info	ON	Ottawa	1972	1995
Miteinander – Füreinander	ON	Ottawa	1994	2003
Nepean News	ON	Ottawa	?	2018
Orléans Star	ON	Ottawa	?	2018
The Ottawa Chinese Community Newsletter	ON	Ottawa	1977	1987
Ottawa Journal	ON	Ottawa	1885	1980
Ottawa East News	ON	Ottawa	?	2018
Ottawa South News	ON	Ottawa	?	2018
Ottawa RushHour	ON	Ottawa	2007	2008
Ottawa West News	ON	Ottawa	?	2018
Ottawa XPress	ON	Ottawa	1993	2012
Xtra Ottawa	ON	Ottawa	1993	2015
Paris Star	ON	Paris	?	2020
The Paris Independent	ON	Paris	2021	2025
Parry Sound Beacon Star	ON	Parry Sound	?	2023
Parry Sound North Star	ON	Parry Sound	1874	2023
Pelham News	ON	Pelham	?	2018
Pembroke Daily Observer	ON	Pembroke	1855	2018
Perth Courier	ON	Perth	1834	2023
Peterborough This Week	ON	Peterborough	1989	2023
Petrolia Topic	ON	Petrolia	?	2018
Pickering News Advertiser	ON	Pickering	?	2023
Framåt	ON	Port Arthur	1916	1917
InPort News	ON	Port Colborne	?	2018
Port Colborne Leader	ON	Port Colborne	1996	2023
Port Perry Star	ON	Port Perry	1866	2023
Der Canadische Beobachter	ON	Preston	1848	1850
Quinte West News	ON	Quinte West	?	2018
Rainy River Record	ON	Raint River	1919	2016
The Northern Sun News	ON	Red Lake	?	2019
Deutsche Post	ON	Renfrew	1841	1865
Renfrew Mercury	ON	Renfrew	1871	2023
Richmond Hill Liberal	ON	Richmond Hill	1878	2023
The Sault Star	ON	Sault Ste. Marie	1901	2026
Heimatbote	ON	Scarborough	1961	1987
Stittsville News	ON	Sittsville	1957	2018
Smith Falls Record News	ON	Smith Falls	1887	2023
Stayner Sun	ON	Stayner	?	2023
St. Marys Journal-Argus	ON	St. Marys	?	2017
St. Thomas/Elgin Weekly News	ON	St. Thomas	?	2018
Stouffville Sun-Tribune	ON	Stouffville	1888	2023
Der Canadische Kolonist	ON	Stratford	1864	1906
Der Perth Volksfreund	ON	Stratford	1878	1883
Stratford City Gazette	ON	Stratford	?	2018
L'Ami du peuple	ON	Sudbury	1942	1968
Onkweonwe	ON	Sudbury	1900	1901
Sudbury Star	ON	Sudbury	1909	2026
Vapaus	ON	Sudbury	1917	1974
Tavistock Gazette	ON	Tavistock	1895	2021
Shoreline Week	ON	Tecumseh	?	2020
Tecumseh Tribune	ON	Tecumseh	1959	2012
Thornhill Liberal	ON	Thornhill	?	2023
Thorold Niagara News	ON	Thorold	?	2018
Canadan Sanomat	ON	Thunder Bay	2001	2012
Tilbury Times	ON	Tilbury	?	2020
Lake Shore Shopper	ON	Tillsonburg	?	2020
Tillsonburg News	ON	Tillsonburg	?	2020
The Daily Press	ON	Timmins	1930	2026
Ahathiyah Publication	ON	Toronto	2003	?
Beach and South Riverdale Mirror	ON	Toronto	?	2023
Bloor West Villager	ON	Toronto	?	2023
Canada Svensken	ON	Toronto	1961	1978
Canadian Jewish News	ON	Toronto	1960	2020
City Centre Mirror	ON	Toronto	?	2023
Colonial Advocate	ON	Toronto	1824	1834
Contrast	ON	Toronto	1969	1990
Die Freie Presse	ON	Toronto	1886	1888
Die Zeit	ON	Toronto	1967	?
Doi Luc	ON	Toronto	?	?
East York Mirror	ON	Toronto	?	2023
Etobicoke Guardian	ON	Toronto	?	2023
Eye Weekly	ON	Toronto	1991	2011
Flash	ON	Toronto	1938	1973
The Globe	ON	Toronto	1844	1936
The Grid	ON	Toronto	2011	2014
Guerilla	ON	Toronto	1970	1974
Hung Chung She Po	ON	Toronto	1929	1956
Hush	ON	Toronto	1927	1973
Jack Canuck	ON	Toronto	1911	1939
The Jewish Tribune	ON	Toronto	1964	2015
Justice Weekly	ON	Toronto	1946	1972
Keneder yiddishe vochenblatt	ON	Toronto	1926	1979
Kirchliches Monatsblatt	ON	Toronto	1943	2012
The Mail and Empire	ON	Toronto	1895	1936
Ming Pao Daily News	ON	Toronto	1993	2026
Modern Times Weekly	ON	Toronto	1985	1990
North York Mirror	ON	Toronto	?	2023
Now	ON	Toronto	1981	2022
Our Lives: Canada's First Black Women's Newspaper	ON	Toronto	1986	1989
Scarborough Mirror	ON	Toronto	?	2023
Shing Wah Chou Pao	ON	Toronto	1916	1917
Shing Wah Daily News	ON	Toronto	1922	1990
Sing Tao Daily	ON	Toronto	?	2022
South Asian Vision	ON	Toronto	2012	?
StarMetro Toronto	ON	Toronto	2000	2019
Star Weekly	ON	Toronto	1910	1973
Tab International	ON	Toronto	1956	1990
Today Daily News	ON	Toronto	2006	?
tonight	ON	Toronto	2009	2014
Toronto Clarion	ON	Toronto	1976	1985
Toronto Daily Telegraph	ON	Toronto	1866	1872
Toronto Empire	ON	Toronto	1897	1895
Toronto Leader	ON	Toronto	1852	1878
Toronto Mail	ON	Toronto	1872	1895
Toronto Standard	ON	Toronto	1848	1849
Toronto Telegram	ON	Toronto	1876	1971
Toronto World	ON	Toronto	1880	1924
Vapaa Sana	ON	Toronto	1931	2012
The Voice of Pakistan	ON	Toronto	1972	2000
The Weekly Times of India	ON	Toronto	2001	?
Xtra Magazine	ON	Toronto	1984	2015
Yathra News	ON	Toronto	2007	?
York Commonwealth	ON	Toronto	1857	1890
York Guardian	ON	Toronto	?	2023
24 Hours Toronto	ON	Toronto	2003	2017
Uxbridge Times Journal	ON	Uxbridge	1869	2023
Vaughan Citizen	ON	Vaughan	?	2023
Wallaceburg News	ON	Walkerton	?	2007
Walkerton Glocke	ON	Walkerton	1870	1904
Wasaga Sun	ON	Wasaga Beach	?	2023
Canada Museum und Allgemeine Zeitung	ON	Waterloo	1835	1840
Der Canadische Baurenfreund	ON	Waterloo	1850	1918
Der Morgenstern	ON	Waterloo	1839	1841
Der Deutsche Reformer	ON	Waterloo	1863	1863
Kitchener-Waterloo Review	ON	Waterloo	?	2012
Waterloo Chronicle	ON	Waterloo	1856	2023
West Carleton Review	ON	West Carleton	?	2018
Whitby This Week	ON	Whitby	?	2023
Wilmot Post	ON	Wilmot	?	2021
The Essex/Windsor Record	ON	Windsor	1861	1917
Voice of the Fugitive	ON	Windsor	1851	1853
Windsor This Week	ON	Windsor	?	2012
The York Commonwealth	ON	York	1857	1890
Akwesasne Indian Times	QC	Akwesasne	1983	2024
Le Progrès de Bellechasse	QC	Bellechasse	?	2013
Chambly Express	QC	Chambly	2010	2014
Le Havre	QC	Chandler	?	2018
Châteauguay Express	QC	Châteauguay	2011	2014
Roussillon Express	QC	Châteauguay	?	2014
L'Impact de Drummondville	QC	Drummondville	?	2014
24 Heures Gatineau	QC	Gatineau	2004	2008
Le Droit	QC	Gatineau	1913	2023
Le Pharillon	QC	Gaspé	1973	2018
La Voix de l'Est	QC	Granby	1935	2023
The Gazette Megantic Edition	QC	Inverness	1899	1911
Le Journal de Joliette	QC	Joliette	?	2014
Le Réveil	QC	Jonquière	?	2014
L'Écho de Laval	QC	Laval	?	2014
Le Journal de Magog	QC	Magog	?	2014
Le Cri de l'Est	QC	Matane	1911	?
La Voix de la Matanie	QC	Matane	?	2014
La Voix Gaspésienne	QC	Matane	?	2014
L'Action Regionale	QC	Monteregie	?	2013
24 Heures Montréal	QC	Montreal	2001	2023
L'Abeille canadienne	QC	Montreal	1818	?
L'Ami du peuple, de l'ordre et des lois	QC	Montreal	1832	?
L'Aurore	QC	Montreal	1817	?
L'Aurore des Canadas, Journal littéraire, politique et commercial	QC	Montreal	1839	?
L'Avenir	QC	Montreal	1847	?
La Bibliothèque canadienne, ou miscellanées historiques, scientifiques et littéraires	QC	Montreal	1825	?
Canadian courant and Montreal Advertiser	QC	Montreal	1807	?
Canadian Illustrated News	QC	Montreal	1869	1883
The Canadian Inspector	QC	Montreal	1815	?
The Canadian Magazine and Literary Repository	QC	Montreal	1823	?
The Canadian Review and Literary and Historical Journal	QC	Montreal	1824	?
The Canadian Spectator	QC	Montreal	1822	?
The Canadian Times and Weekly Literary and Political Reporter	QC	Montreal	1823	?
Chân Trời Mới	QC	Montreal	1975	1977
Christian Register	QC	Montreal	1823	?
The Christian Sentinel and Anglo-Canadian Churchman's Magazine	QC	Montreal	1827	?
Le coin du feu	QC	Montreal	1829	?
Corriere Italiano	QC	Montreal	1952	2023
Le Courrier du Bas-Canada	QC	Montreal	1819	?
Das Echo	QC	Montreal	1978	2022
Dimanche-Matin	QC	Montreal	1954	1985
L'Express d'Mont-Royal	QC	Montreal	?	2018
L'Express d'Outremont	QC	Montreal	?	2018
The Free Press	QC	Montreal	?	2017
La Gazette canadienne/The Canadian Gazette	QC	Montreal	1807	?
La Gazette du commerce et littéraire pour la Ville & District de Montréal	QC	Montreal	1778	?
Hour	QC	Montreal	1996	2012
Ici	QC	Montreal	?	2009
The Irish Vindicator and Canada General Advertiser	QC	Montreal	1828	?
Le Jour	QC	Montreal	1973	1978
The Literary Garland	QC	Montreal	1838	?
Le Magasin du Bas-Canada, Journal littéraire et scientifique	QC	Montreal	1832	?
Métro	QC	Montreal	2001	2023
Ming Pao Daily News	BC and ON	Toronto and Vancouver	1993	2026
Montreal Star	QC	Montreal	1869	1979
Montreal Daily News	QC	Montreal	1988	1989
The Montreal Herald	QC	Montreal	1811	1957
Montreal Mirror	QC	Montreal	1985	2012
Montreal Standard	QC	Montreal	1905	1951
La Nationaliste	QC	Montreal	1904	1922
Northern Review	QC	Montreal	1945	1956
La Minerve	QC	Montreal	1826	1899
Canadian Illustrated News	QC	Montreal	1869	1883
The Monitor	QC	Montreal	1926	2009
Montreal Daily News	QC	Montreal	1988	1989
Montréal-Matin	QC	Montreal	1930	1978
The Montreal Museum or Journal of Literature and Arts	QC	Montreal	1832	?
Montreal Vindicator	QC	Montreal	1832	?
Montreal Witness	QC	Montreal	1845	1938
L'Observateur	QC	Montreal	1830	?
La Patrie	QC	Montreal	1879	1978
Le Pays	QC	Montreal	1852	?
Le Populaire	QC	Montreal	1837	?
La Presse	QC	Montreal	1884	2017
La Presse Chinoise	QC	Montreal	1980	2010
La Quotidienne	QC	Montreal	1837	?
The Scribbler	QC	Montreal	1821	?
The Sunday Express	QC	Montreal	?	1985
Le Temps	QC	Montreal	1838	?
The West Island Chronicle	QC	Montreal	1925	2015
L'Écho de la Lièvre	QC	Mont-Laurier	?	2014
Vallée-du-Richelieu Express	QC	Mont-Saint-Hilaire	?	2014
Point de vue Laurentides	QC	Mont-Tremblant	?	2014
L'Écho de la Baie	QC	New Richmond	?	2018
L'Abeille canadienne	QC	Quebec City	1833	?
L'Almanach des dames	QC	Quebec City	1806	?
The British American Register	QC	Quebec City	1802	?
Le Canadien	QC	Quebec City	1806	1893
Le Constitutionnel	QC	Quebec City	1823	?
Le Cours du tems	QC	Quebec City	1794	?
Courier de Québec	QC	Quebec City	1807	?
Le Courier de Québec ou héraut francois	QC	Quebec City	1788	?
Le Cultivateur	QC	Quebec City	1874	?
L'Électeur/The Elector	QC	Quebec City	1827	?
The Enquirer	QC	Quebec City	1821	?
Le Fantasque	QC	Quebec City	1837	1845
Journal de médecine de Québec	QC	Quebec City	1826	?
Journal des sciences naturelles	QC	Quebec City	1828	?
Le Libéral	QC	Quebec City	1837	?
Le Magasin de Quebec/The Quebec Magazine	QC	Quebec City	1792	?
Le Nationaliste	QC	Quebec City	1904	1922
Quebec Herald and Universal Miscellany	QC	Quebec City	1788	?
Quebec Mercury	QC	Quebec City	1805	1863
The Quebec Telegraph	QC	Quebec City	1816	?
Le Soleil	QC	Quebec City	1896	2023
Le Spectateur canadien	QC	Quebec City	1815	?
Le Télégraphe	QC	Quebec City	1836	?
Le Vrai Canadien	QC	Quebec City	1810	?
L'Écho De Repentigny	QC	Repentigny	?	2014
Le Progrès-Écho	QC	Rimouski	?	2014
Le Rimouskois	QC	Rimouski	?	2014
Le Saint-Laurent Portage	QC	Rivière-du-Loup	?	2014
Abitibi Express	QC	Rouyn-Noranda	?	2014
Le Quotidien	QC	Saguenay	1973	2023
Le Saint-Armand	QC	Saint-Armand	2003	2023
Le Point du Lac-Saint-Jean	QC	Saint-Félicien	?	2014
L'Écho du pays	QC	Saint-Charles-sur-Richelieu	1833	?
Le Glaneur, journal littéraire, d’agriculture et d’industrie	QC	Saint-Charles-sur-Richelieu	1836	?
L'Écho de Saint-Jean-sur-Richelieu	QC	Saint-Jean-sur-Richelieu	?	2014
Le Magazine Saint-Lambert	QC	Saint-Lambert	?	2013
La Gazette de Saint-Philippe	QC	Saint-Philippe-de-Laprairie	1826	?
L'Impartial	QC	Saint-Philippe-de-Laprairie	1834	?
Le Riverain	QC	Sainte-Anne-des-Monts	?	2014
Beauce Média	QC	Sainte-Marie-de-Beauce	?	2014
L'Écho de La Rive-Nord	QC	Sainte-Thérèse	?	2014
Valleyfield Express	QC	Salaberry-de-Valleyfield	2011	2014
L'Écho de Shawinigan	QC	Shawinigan	?	2014
La Tribune	QC	Sherbrooke	1910	2023
Sorel Tracy Express	QC	Sorel-Tracy	2010	2014
British Colonist and St-Françis Gazette	QC	Stanstead	1823	?
Stanstead Journal	QC	Stanstead	1845	2019
L'Ami de la religion et du roi	QC	Trois-Rivières	1820	?
L'Argus, Journal electorique	QC	Trois-Rivières	1826	?
L'Écho de Trois-Rivières	QC	Trois-Rivières	2011	2014
Gazette des Trois-Rivières	QC	Trois-Rivières	1817	?
Le Nouvelliste	QC	Trois-Rivières	1920	2023
Abitibi Express	QC	Val-d'Or	2010	2014
Première Édition	QC	Vaudreuil-Dorion	?	2018
L’Écho de Victoriaville	QC	Victoriaville	2012	2014
Westmount Examiner	QC	Westmount	1935	2015
Alameda Dispatch	SK	Alameda	1901	1947
Moose Mountain Star	SK	Arcola	1922	1959
Avonlea Beacon	SK	Avonlea	1944	1951
Battleford Press	SK	Battleford	1906	1949
Saskatchewan Herald	SK	Battleford	1878	1938
Deep South Star	SK	Bengough	1993	2017
Birch Hills Gazette	SK	Birch Hills	1943	1994
Bruno Banner	SK	Bruno	1952	1955
Bruno New Banner	SK	Bruno	1943	1952
Cabri Enterprise	SK	Cabri	1943	1949
Canwood Times	SK	Canwood	1926	1966
Carlyle Observer	SK	Carlyle	1936	2025
Carnduff Gazette Post News	SK	Carnduff	1899	2017
Weekly Climax	SK	Climax	1926	1965
Fertile Valley Enterprise	SK	Conquest	1921	1947
Coronach Courier	SK	Coronach	1943	1945
Triangle News	SK	Coronach	1983	2017
Cupar Herald	SK	Cupar	1906	1952
Cut Knife Grinder	SK	Cut Knife	1950	1958
Cut Knife Highway 40 Courier	SK	Cut Knife	?	2020
Cut Knife Journal	SK	Cut Knife	1913	1914
Delisle Advocate	SK	Delisle	1943	1959
Prairie Times	SK	Dodsland	1917	1941
Earl Grey Coronet	SK	Earl Grey	1913	1915
Eastend Enterprise	SK	Eastend	1914	1980
Elrose Review	SK	Elrose	1981	1992
Esterhazy Observer and Phesant Hills Advertiser	SK	Esterhazy	1907	1948
Estevan Mercury	SK	Estevan	1903	2025
Estevan Progress	SK	Estevan	1916	1921
Creelman Gazette and Fillmore News	SK	Fillmore	1943	1954
Hanley Herald	SK	Hanley	1905	1917
Herbert Herald	SK	Herbert	1911	2024
Hudson Bay Post-Review	SK	Hudson Bay	?	2015
Kipling Citizen	SK	Kipling	?	2020
La Ronge Northerner	SK	La Ronge	?	2015
The New Waterfront Press	SK	Lumsden	?	2017
Meadow Lake Progress	SK	Meadow Lake	?	2013
Moose Jaw Times-Herald	SK	Moose Jaw	1889	2017
Oxbow Herald	SK	Oxbow	1913	2017
Radville Star	SK	Radville	1911	2017
Redvers Optimist	SK	Redvers	?	2016
Metro Regina	SK	Regina	2012	2014
Regina Sun	SK	Regina	1983	2015
Metro Saskatoon	SK	Saskatoon	2012	2014
Spiritwood Herald	SK	Spiritwood	?	2020
Yorkton News Review	SK	Yorkton	?	2016
Whitehorse Star	YT	Whitehorse	1900	2024
The Yukon Star	YT	Whitehorse	2024	2024
