= Dania Suleman =

Canadian writer

- Education: Université du Québec à Montréal
- Occupations: Writer, researcher
- Notable work: Les malentendues (2021 book)

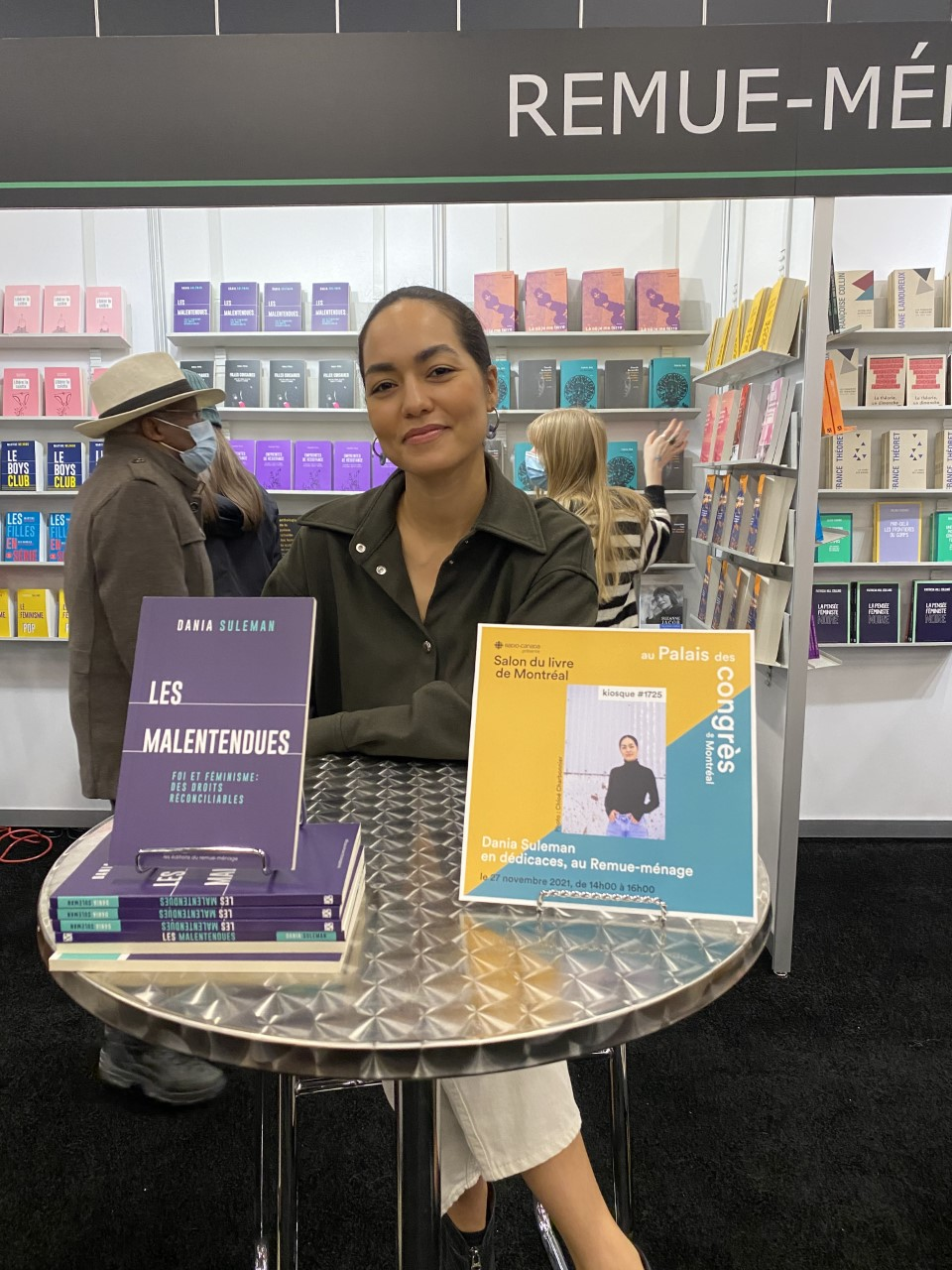

Dania Suleman is a Canadian writer and media fact checker. She was formerly a lawyer who specialized in labour law. Suleman is the author of the 2021 book Les malentendues.

== Early life and education ==
Suleman was born and raised in Longueuil and Brossard, Quebec. Her father, Said Suleman, is Eritrean; her mother, Marie Germain, is Quebecois. She grew up with her sister, Sara, spending week days with her mother and weekends with her father, her parents having divorced when she was a young child.

Suleman received her master's degree in international law in 2017 from Université du Québec à Montréal.

== Career ==
Suleman featured in the 2011 Radio Canada International production, Me, The Muslim Next Door.

Suleman works as a media researcher, director and fact checker, providing research support to films including the Québec documentary Briser le code [fr] (English: Break the Code). The documentary received an award for "Best Digital Component" in a documentary from Le Prix Gémeaux in 2020.

In an interview with Métro she called for "plus de curiosité et moins de rigidité" ("more curiosity and less rigidity"). Suleman has appeared in various news articles in both French and English.

== Personal life ==
As of 2018, Suleman resides in New York.

== Les malentendues ==
Dania Suleman
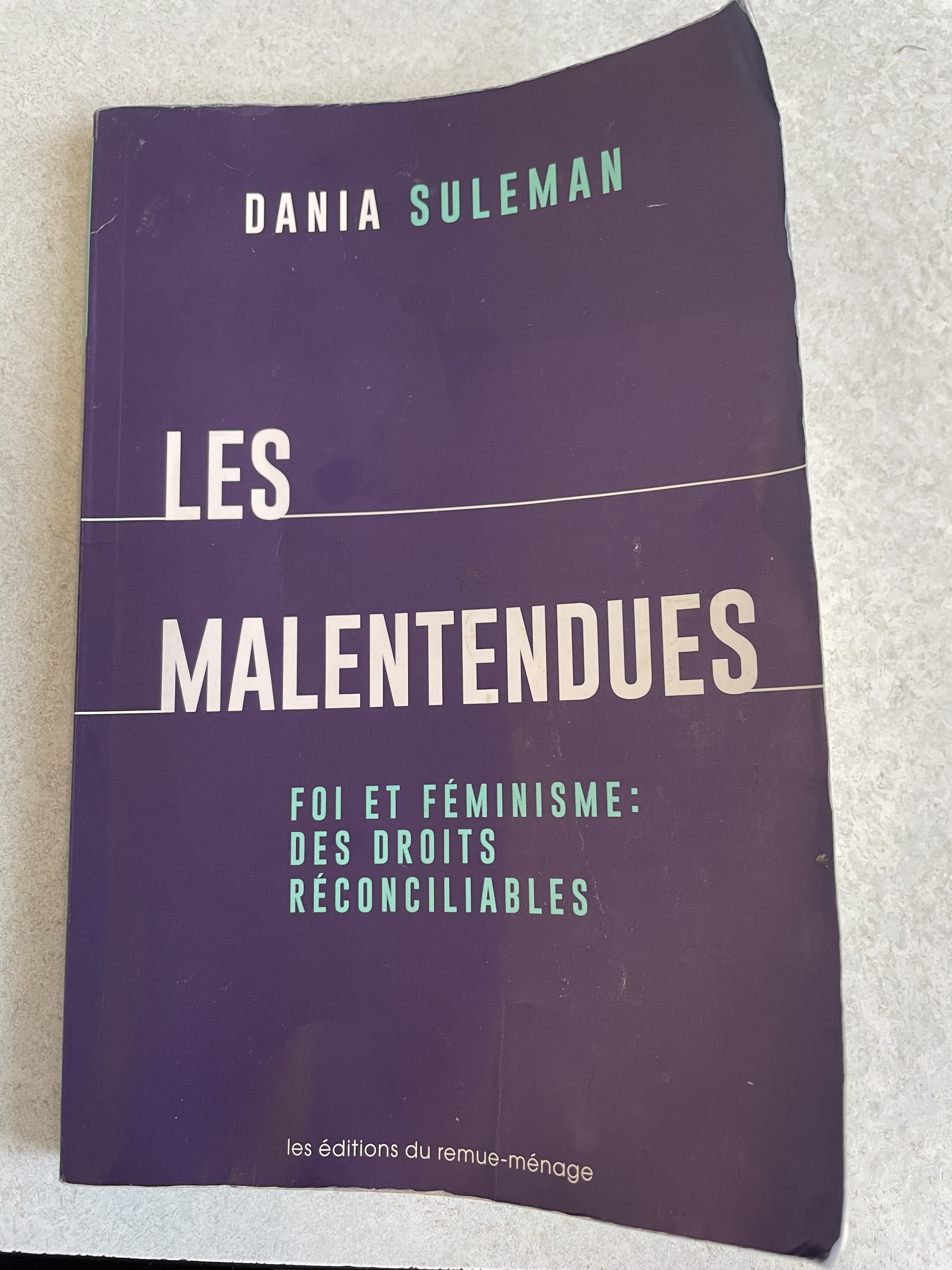
- Author: Dania Suleman
- Publisher: Éditions du remue-ménage
- Publication date: April 2021 (Canada); September 2021 (Europe)
- Pages: 125
- ISBN: 978-2-89091-755-2

Les malentendues (English: Misunderstandings: faith and feminism: reconcilable rights) is a 2021 non-fiction book.

=== Publication ===
The 125 page book is published by Éditions du remue-ménage [fr]. It was released in Canada in April 2021 and in Europe in September the same year. Suleman wrote the book in response to Bill 21 which promoted secularism in Quebec by prohibiting the exhibition of visible signs of religion from public sector employees.

=== Synopsis ===
The book asks whether feminism and religion are mutually exclusive and suggests that in fact they are reconcilable.

After the introduction, the book has five chapters: Freedom of Religion in Canada; From Reasonable Accommodation to the Right to Equality; Women, Religions, and Courts; Reconciling the Irreconcilable; and Necessary Deconstructions for a Possible Reconciliation.

=== Critical reception ===
The Radio Canada International-sponsored Montreal Book Fair described the book as "brief and brilliant". Reviewing the English translation for Montreal Review of Books, Aishwarya Singh concludes, "Suleman’s work exposes and counters the sensationalist narratives about religion in our society that are often a vehicle for othering and an obstacle to solidarity."

== See also ==
- List of feminist literature
- Women and religion
