= Westmount Examiner =

Defunct Canadian newspaper

- Type: Weekly newspaper
- Format: Berliner
- Owner: Transcontinental Inc.
- Publisher: Denis Therrien
- Editor-in-chief: Wayne Larsen
- News editor: Nancy Macdonald
- Founded: 1935
- Ceased publication: October 21, 2015
- Language: English
- Headquarters: 345 Victoria Avenue, Suite 508; Westmount, Quebec
- Circulation: 11,000 copies weekly
- Sister newspapers: The Monitor, The Verdun Guardian, The West Island Chronicle
- Website: Archive (Sep. 2015)

The Westmount Examiner was a weekly English language newspaper serving Westmount, Quebec, Canada. It had a circulation of 11,000, with a policy of covering news only from within Westmount. It had been in print for over 80 years, and accompanied by an online presence beginning December 14, 2009. The paper's final issue came out on October 21, 2015.

== History ==
Established in 1935, the Westmount Examiner initially consisted of only a few pages of local news and advertising. In 1952, its new owner, John Sancton, moved the paper to Westmount. In the late 1980s, the Sancton family sold the newspaper to Publications Dumont. It was part of the Montreal-based Transcontinental Inc.

On October 14, 2015, Transcontinental announced it would be permanently shutting down both the Westmount Examiner and its sister paper, the West Island Chronicle (including their digital online presence). The cited reason being the erosion of advertising revenue. The final issue of the Westmount Examiner was printed on October 21, 2015, with a final farewell message on the paper's website.

== See also ==
- Media in Montreal
- List of Quebec media
- List of newspapers in Canada

=== Montreal newspapers ===
- La Presse
- Le Journal de Montréal
- Le Devoir
- Montreal Daily News
- The Montreal Star
