= The Kingston Gazette =

Canadian daily newspaper

Kingston Gazette
- Their loyalty will never be loud, but it may be depended upon as honest
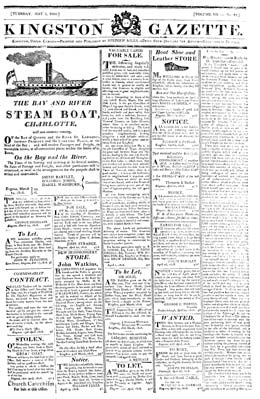
- Type: Daily newspaper
- Founder(s): Stephen Miles, Charles Kendall, and Nahum Mower
- Founded: 1810
- Ceased publication: 1818
- City: Kingston, Ontario
- ISSN: 1181-2443

The Kingston Gazette was a daily newspaper published in Kingston, Ontario from 1810 to 1818.

== History ==
The Kingston Gazette was started by the partnership of Stephen Miles, Charles Kendall, and Nahum Mower. The paper has been described as the first newspaper between Montreal and Toronto (York), and for much of the War of 1812, the only paper in Upper Canada.

Nahum Mower was a printer in Vermont in 1805, when a new apprentice began in his employ, Stephen Miles. Born in Royalton, Vermont on October 19, 1789, Miles accompanies Mower to Montreal in 1807, where Mower starts the Canadian Courant (Current). Three years later they arrive in Kingston, transporting their small printing press by batteau, or flat bottom riverboat, on September 13, 1810. The three begin publishing the Kingston Gazette with a prospectus in June 1810, followed by the first issue in the fall, with Mower standing for Miles since he was still not of age. Mower appears to have returned to Montreal and the Courant, being listed as an agent for the Gazette by 1818. One item of note would be that although the paper cost 15 shillings per year for subscription, the proprietors also accepted wood cords, farm produce or clean rags, the later useful in paper-making.

“It is intended that the Kingston Gazette shall be made the earliest possible vehicle of intelligence, both foreign and domestic. It will exhibit, from time to time, a statement of Parliamentary proceedings, and internal regulations, as well as of the general concerns of the Province. The best information for the farmer, the merchant and mechanic, they will also endeavor to give. Curious are the tastes to be consulted; and though none may find the Kingston Gazette wholly adapted to his own, it is hoped that every correct reader may find something which will gratify his palate… .Gentlemen of science and leisure, the divine, the moralist, the poet and the politician, are each respectfully invited to enrich our columns with their respective pens….Living under an enlightened government, mildly and generously administered, they will be the last to abuse the privileges it affords them. Their loyalty will never be loud, but it may be depended upon as honest. If called upon to scan the conduct of their rulers, they will be firm but decorous…. It shall be their chief study that the liberty they possess does not degenerate into licentiousness.” — "Prospectus", June 1810

Miles would leave the paper on April 6, 1811, travelling to Montreal, New York, then returning to Kingston on October 29. At this time Kendall had decided to return to America, and Miles had been requested to return to the paper. The request had come from one of the new owners, Richard Cartwright, who had submitted articles as requested of “gentlemen of science and leisure.” This group of businessmen and professionals would sell the paper back to Miles on easy terms. The next few years prove eventful for Miles, serving in the War while still publishing the paper. These issues included Upper Canada's 2nd and 3rd Statutes of the 6th Parliament. He marries Laura Spaford on June 22, 1812, opening a bookstore and tri-weekly circulating library, continuing to print and publish until 1818. At this point, tired of the political climate and the harassment by Robert Gourley, Scottish land agent and anti-Family Compact advocate, he decides to sell his stake in the paper. Alexander John Pringle and John Alexander Macauley (owners of The Kingston Chronicle) purchase and rename the paper, keeping Miles on as printer until 1821.

For the next seven years Miles serves as printer for the Upper Canada Herald, owned and edited by his brother-in-law. During this time Miles marries his second wife, Lucinda Daniels of Windsor on Aug 21st, 1822. In 1828 he establishes the Gazette and Religious Advocate, the first religious weekly in Upper Canada. It ran from June 20 of that year until overshadowed by Egerton Ryerson's Christian Guardian, ending on March 26, 1830. Afterwards, Miles was printer for the Canadian Watchman, a Presbyterian sheet published by Ezra S. Ely, then in 1831 he moved to Prescott, Ontario, buying and renaming the Telegraph as the Grenville Gazette, publishing from January 1832 to April 1833. Miles would sell the paper to Donald McLeod and return to Kingston and the Chronicle as foreman until 1835, when he begins the process of becoming an ordained Wesleyan Methodist preacher. He would pass away at Clark's Mills (Camden East) on December 13, 1870, his son Elijah in business as printer and proprietor of the Hastings Chronicle in Belleville.

The paper continued until 1819 when it became the Kingston Chronicle under Pringle and Macauley.

== See also ==
- List of newspapers in Canada
