= The Leamington Post =

Former Ontario newspaper published from 1874 to 2012

- Type: Weekly newspaper
- Founder: William McSween
- Founded: 1874
- Ceased publication: 2012
- City: Leamington, Ontario
- ISSN: 0844-2703

The Leamington Post was a weekly newspaper published in Leamington, Ontario, from 1874 to 2012.

== History ==
The Erie Post began in 1874, changing to the Leamington Post in 1876 under editor William McSween when the first village council took office. A $600 investment by McSween resulted in an eight-column small sheet, which was bought by Charles H. Fox, but reacquired by McSween the next year. Records indicate that McSween was born May 8, 1849, in Scotland, marrying Florence Foster from Mersea Township, who was born in Essex, Ontario, in 1859. A member of the Leamington's council during its 1890 recognition as a town, McSween was followed by T. R. Stobbs in 1878. H. Thomson Magill is listed as an editor in 1880, overseeing the paper when a fire destroyed the plant in May 1883. The fire ravaged a large section of the business district, only to have it burn again two years later. Magill's editorial from November 18, 1880, details his thoughts on politics, immigration and patriotism.

John E. Johnson was born in Wentworth, Ontario, on June 24, 1843. Previous to his time with the paper, Johnson worked at the Cleveland Herald during the American Civil War, and as a teacher and principal of schools in Essex County. He purchased the Leamington Post in 1886, selling a year later and buying the Essex Liberal. Two years later he sold that, and rejoined the Post as proprietor. J. F. McKay and Johnson established the Post Printing Company in 1889, buying out the rival Leamington Tribune and repurchasing the Post from the firm of Wigle and Williams, whom Johnson had sold it to after buying it after Magill's death. During the McKay-Johnson partnership, they were also owners of the Comber Herald and publishers of the Kingsville Reporter. After McKay's withdrawal, Johnson went it alone until 1898, selling and rebuying the paper with R. E. Marcotte after a year spent leading an expedition to the Yukon. Johnson was also mayor of Leamington for three years and was proprietor of a farm featuring 7,000 peach trees. In 1907, A. A. Whitwam arrived in Leamington, joining the paper and overseeing its acquiring of the Leamington News in 1910 with Johnson.

Byron Lane, a Leamington native, purchased Johnson's interest in the now-titled Post & News in 1914. A long-time newspaper man, Lane's career began with the Leamington Post in 1875 when he was just 15 years old. He went on to work for the Winnipeg Free Press and other newspapers in Canada and the United States, including those in Toronto and New York. In the late 1880s, he moved to Winchester, Ontario where he purchased the West Winchester Directory and renamed it the Winchester Press. It was there that he met future Leamington mayor Philip H. Fader, who began working at the Press in 1910. Lane sold his stake in the Press in 1913 and lived in Edmonton, Alberta until August 1914, when he joined the Post & News. He added Fader to the Post & News staff in 1919.

Until 1910, the paper would feature a fair amount of tobacco news for the growers in the area, but when the industry began to crash, the H. J. Heinz plant would become a focus for farmers in 1909 and many years to come. Not only Leamington, but the Post & News would also be read by the communities of Albuna, Blytheswood, Ruthven, Inman, Cottam, Pelee Island and Staples. A reader would be hard pressed to find an issue that didn't have some bowling columns, a very popular sport in the area. In the early 1920s, the paper had a circulation of 2,200 in the town of 3,600. A per annum subscription of $2 would get the reader an eight-page, seven column sheet.

Following Lane's retirement in late January 1937 due to poor health, Fader became managing editor of the Post & News. At that time, A. A. Whitwam became president of the Post Printing Company, and Fader became secretary-treasurer. Lane died a few weeks later on 19 February 1937.

In 1949, W. A. McKenzie took over as editor until 1954, remaining with the paper as a publisher until 1966 when Thomson Newspapers Ltd bought it. In 1952 Peter Alfred Drake became a general manager and a publisher in 1955, working with editor Tony Duncan until retiring in 1974. Drake was born in England in 1905, moving to Leamington in 1925 and joining the paper's staff in 1927/28. He became advertising manager in 1937, having worked as a compositor, linotype operator and pressman. Drake was a Lions Club member, president of the Chamber of Commerce, and is credited with being the original Tomato Festival developer. Tony Duncan joined the paper in 1954 as an editor, taking over for Drake as his 46 years with the paper ended in January 1974. The Post would publish from a new location starting in 1971 on the corner of Princess Street and Mill Street East.

Tony Duncan would publish the paper until the mid-1990s with Mike Thibodeau, who had been a news editor with the paper from 1977, until Don Gage became publisher in 1995, with Thibodeau remaining as editor. The Leamington Post would continue printing until 2012, when it ceased operation after 138 years in publication.

== See also ==
- List of newspapers in Canada
