= L. Ian MacDonald =

Canadian writer, columnist and broadcaster (1947–2026)

- Born: Lawrence Ian MacDonald; 1947
- Died: October 8, 2026 (aged 78)
- Education: Concordia University (Loyola)
- Occupations: Author; columnist; broadcaster; public speaker; diplomat
- Children: 2

Lawrence Ian MacDonald (1947 – October 8, 2026) was a Canadian writer, columnist, broadcaster, public speaker and diplomat. In his career he was the primary speechwriter for Canadian prime minister Brian Mulroney, wrote the Queen's Canadian speeches for the government, and worked as head of communications (Minister of Public Affairs) at the Canadian Embassy to the United States in Washington, D.C. He was a columnist for the Montreal Gazette (as national affairs columnist), and the now-defunct Montreal Daily News. He was editor-in-chief of Policy Options, his political column appeared on iPolitics, and he was a frequent commentator on CPAC (the Cable Public Affairs Channel) and CTV (the CTV Television Network). He has also written a number of books.

== Life and career ==
=== Early life ===
MacDonald was born in 1947. His mother was Marian MacDonald, and his father, Arthur, was an engineer who died of a heart attack in 1958 when Ian was 10 years old. MacDonald graduated from Loyola College, now part of Concordia University (L BA '69; honors political science). He lived in Montreal, Canada. He was inducted in the Concordia University Sports Hall of Fame in 2002 as equipment manager of the Loyola College Warriors 1968 hockey team.

=== Career ===
From 1985 to 1988, for four years MacDonald wrote speeches for Canadian prime minister Brian Mulroney as his primary speechwriter, and for years wrote the Queen's Canadian speeches. From 1992 to 1994 he worked as head of communications (Minister of Public Affairs) at the Canadian Embassy in Washington, D.C., in the United States.

MacDonald was a columnist for the Montreal Gazette (as national affairs columnist), and the now-defunct Montreal Daily News. He wrote frequently for Canadian newspapers and news sites. He served as editor and publisher of Policy magazine, a bi-monthly on Canadian politics and public policy. He was editor-in-chief from 2002 to 2012 of Policy Options, published by the Institute for Research on Public Policy. His political column appeared on iPolitics and he was a frequent commentator on CPAC (the Cable Public Affairs Channel) and CTV (the CTV Television Network). Canadian Prime Minister Brian Mulroney said: "The thing that makes Ian MacDonald's columns interesting and important to read is that he's worked on the inside at very senior levels of government and knows how it works. And it shows."

He wrote his first book in 1984, "Mulroney: The Making of the Prime Minister" that covered Brian Mulroney's rise from boyhood to Prime Minister of Canada. MacDonald has published six more books, all with McGill–Queen's University Press, most recently Politics, People & Potpourri, selected by CBC (CBC Television) as "one of the best political reads" of 2009, and Inside Politics, a collection published in 2018.

=== Personal life and death ===
MacDonald had two daughters. His niece, Christina Smith, is the former mayor of Westmount. He died on October 8, 2026, at the age of 78.

== Publications ==
- Mulroney: The Making of the Prime Minister, 1984
- Free Trade: Risks and Rewards, edited by MacDonald, 2000
- From Bourassa to Bourassa: Wilderness to Restoration, 2002
- Leo: A Life, by Leo Kolber, with MacDonald, 2003
- Politics, People & Potpourri, 2009
- Inside Politics, 2018
- Politics & Players, 2022
