= Leifur =

Leifur is a given name. Notable people with the name include:

- Leifur Ásgeirsson (1903–1990), Icelandic mathematician
- Leifur Garðarsson (born 1968), Icelandic basketball referee, athlete and football manager
- Leifur James, English record producer and composer
- Leifur Magnusson (1882–1960), Icelandic American economist

== See also ==
- Leifur Eriksson International Airport, the largest airport in Iceland,
