= The Kingston News-Standard =

The Kingston News-Standard was a daily/weekly newspaper published in Kingston, Ontario, Canada from 1839 to 1925, publishing daily from at least 1868 to at least 1887.

== History ==
The News is believed to have started in 1839, and is listed as having united with the Kingston Chronicle & Gazette to become the Chronicle and News in 1847. The earliest known proprietor was Samuel Rowland in 1851-1852, who had purchased the Chronicle and Gazette after owner James Macfarlane’s death. Samuel was a clerk for the courts in Kingston, having come to the town from Cobourg where he married his wife Mary Dudden in 1841. Their ownership continued until 1871, when the Shannon brothers were in control, with sibling James editing the paper. His tack and tone gave way to the paper becoming known as the standard bearer for the political Conservatives in Kingston. The paper was published on Princess Street during the Shannon tenure.

One source cites the Shannon family in the paper consisting of older brother Alfred as a printer, youngest brother Albert as a reporter, James as editor, and Lewis William as publisher/editor. The Whig-Standard recounted a story of William Shannon’s misdeeds as deputy postmaster, stating James as the publisher of the two editions. The Shannon brothers were born in County Londonderry, Ireland in the 1820s. James and William arrived in 1857, clerking at Sir John A. Macdonald’s law office. James used the paper to post numerous notices, offering investment opportunities, and selling stocks and real estate. He also was a member of the Cataraqui Lodge. Lewis was also involved in stocks, as a “Commission Broker of Stocks, Grain and Cotton” from an office at 79 Clarence Street.

At some point, the News is purchased by Andy Moore and C. John Oram, then run by Oram and T. J. Shanks, the latter a managing editor for the News for a decade. The pair also later brought in Thomas Carter of the Whig. Carter is listed in the Whig in 1893, which points to this period taking place after the Shannon family ownership.

The Evening Times, a paper started in 1898 by Rev. James R. Black from the Pappas building, merged with the Times in 1903 to create the News and Times. It was meant as a competitor to the Whig’s daily, with two more pages to their six, and a dollar cheaper a year compared to their price of $6.

On April 8, 1908, the News was taken over by a local syndicate of Conservatives made up of William R. Givens (a one-time News reporter), H. W. Richardson and W. F. Nickle. They formed the Standard Publishing Company Limited and Givens rebranded the paper as the News-Standard to honour its history as a standard bearer for the Tories, with W. Rupert Davies as the publisher. Prior to Givens, the News and Times had been owned by F. W. Wiggins of the Ottawa Free Press, and then by S. M. Newton. Davies had been a publisher and editor at the Herald in Thamesville, the Renfrew Mercury, and was elected to the directorate of the Canadian Press in 1929, becoming president in 1939 through 1941.

The daily Standard was achieving a net paid circulation of 7,200 in 1923, and a few years later was merged with the British Whig to create the Whig-Standard in 1925/1926.

== See also ==
- List of newspapers in Canada
