= Ici (magazine) =

Former French weekly magazine in Montreal

ici was an alternative weekly French language magazine distributed in print in Montreal, Quebec, and online through the Canoe.ca network from 1997 to 2009.

It had an audience of 89,000 readers a week. On April 29, 2009, Quebecor Media announced that it would cease publication of the magazine, with the last issue being published on April 30, 2009. It would live on as ici Week-end, a weekly insert in 24H and on its website.

== See also ==
- List of magazines in Canada
