= Tonight (newspaper) =

Newspaper service

tonight
- Type: Free Biweekly Newspaper
- Format: Magazine
- Owner: Annex Business Media
- Founder(s): John Cameron & Tom Hyde
- Publisher: Martin McAnulty
- Founded: Sept. 8, 2009
- Ceased publication: May 29, 2014
- Headquarters: 222 Edward St., Aurora, Ontario L4G 1W6, 905-727-0077
- Website: www.tonightnews.ca

tonight was a free afternoon newspaper in Toronto, Ontario, Canada, founded in 2009 and acquired by Annex Business Media in 2013. Targeted at evening public transit commuters on GO Transit and TTC (Toronto Transit Commission), its main distribution channels were through the use of newsies, newspaper boxes and PATH billboards throughout Toronto's downtown core, and through newspaper boxes across the TTC. The publication name was originally stylized with periods as t.o.night - a tongue-in-cheek reference to Toronto (often shortened in passing reference as T.O.). The newspaper was unique in Canada, with its magazine size and format, making for easy transit reading.

== History ==
tonight was founded by Toronto entrepreneurs John Cameron and Tom Hyde. The first issue of tonight was published on Tuesday, Sept. 8, 2009, and the publication was based on the successful free evening newspaper mX, published by News Limited throughout Australia.

The paper was originally published on weekday evenings, but switched to a biweekly Tuesday and Thursday print schedule after the acquisition by Annex Business Media in January 2013, and subsequent departure of the founders. tonight had a circulation of 102,000 with an estimated readership of 184,000 each weekday evening. The paper was a direct competitor to Toronto free daily newspapers Metro and 24 Hours.

After being operated for a year and a half by Annex Business Media, the newspaper was closed May 29, 2014.

== Editorial ==
tonight was typically 16 pages - though it had increased page-count up to 32 pages if the opportunity arose - focusing on the freshest news and entertainment stories that come across the newswires. Apart from Associated Press and Canadian Press content, the paper had a number of freelance journalists, along with unique content from blogTO, Sportsnet, and National Geographic Traveler, as well as the New York Times crossword puzzle. tonight's stories were generally concise, featuring a heavy use of photos.

The paper's most popular section was the Shout Outs (a print version of social media for commuters). The Shout Outs had grown in size from the introductory 1/5 of a page to 1-2 pages. The Shout Outs had received local, national and international attention due to their popularity.

== Sections ==
- Around Town – Usually located on the inside front cover, featuring event listings around Toronto based on a transit map, along with weather and lowest gas prices.
- blogTO – Local news and restaurant reviews by the popular blogTO website
- Business – Latest local, national and international business news stories.
- Entertainment/Gossip – Heavy celebrity and television coverage, with the latest gossip, TV listings and late-night television guests.
- News – Concise local, national and international news stories from the Associated Press and The Canadian Press.
- Shout Outs – Popular transit message board, in the form of social media in print, featuring missed connections and opinions by Toronto commuters.
- Sports – Sports news provided by AP and The Canadian Press, along with exclusive columns by Sportsnet.
- Distractions – Crossword, sudoku, New York Times crossword, horoscopes, and celebrity birthday game
- Additional Sections – Lifestyle, Education, National Geographic Traveler, Auto, Your Home, Movies
