= The Canadian Western Jewish Times =

Jewish newspaper in Winnipeg, Canada

- Type: Monthly newspaper
- Editor: Jacob Barron
- Founded: April 1914
- Ceased publication: Unknown
- Headquarters: Winnipeg, Manitoba, Canada

The Canadian Western Jewish Times, established in 1914, was the first Jewish newspaper published in English in Western Canada and the earliest attempt to produce a Western Canadian regional Jewish newspaper in English. Like many other efforts to publish Jewish newspapers in Canada between 1891 and the first decades of the 20th century, it proved to be ephemeral.

== Background ==
Jews first came to the Prairie Provinces of Western Canada in 1877. Although there were only about 3,000 Jews in Winnipeg (Western Canada’s largest city) in 1905 out of a total population of some 80,000 people, Arthur Chiel notes that “the Jews of Manitoba early desired a press of their own” to such an extent that in 1914, the Canadian Israelite (founded in 1910) became the only Yiddish daily newspaper in Canada when it converted from a weekly.

The Canadian Western Jewish Times was operated by Winnipeg-born Jewish brothers Jacob Bell Barron (1888–1965) and Abraham Lee Barron (1889–1966). The two were lawyers by training, graduates of the University of Chicago Law School who had moved to Calgary in 1911. In 1915, Jacob Barron was a barrister at Tweedie & MacGillivray, and in 1917 Abraham Barron was a law student working with his brother. By at least 1920 they formed (with Samuel Joseph Helman, 1894–1981, Jacob Barron’s Jewish brother-in-law) reputedly the first, or one of the earliest, Jewish legal partnerships in Calgary, Barron Barron & Helman. Jacob Barron, who had married in Winnipeg on July 8, 1914, later became a well-known theater impresario.

When the Barron brothers moved to Calgary in 1911, a construction boom was underway there. Calgary’s population had increased by over 1000% in the previous 10 years, going from 4,398 in 1901 to 43,704 in 1911, while the Jewish population grew from one person in 1901 to 604 in 1911, a “handsome synagogue” had been built and a Talmud Torah underway. But in 1913 the real estate boom collapsed and depression set in.

== History ==
In 1914, Abraham Barron was listed as the Business Manager in Calgary of The Canadian Western Jewish Times, with an office at 6 Thomson Block in Calgary. At the time, there were 14 other newspapers and periodicals in the city.

The launch of The Canadian Western Jewish Times as a monthly, published from Winnipeg but with associate editors across Western Canada, was noted in the March 1914 issue of Printer and Publisher, a trade publication. The first issue of The Canadian Western Jewish Times, with Jacob Barron as Editor-in-Chief, is dated April 1914 (the equivalent Hebrew date of Nisan 5674 is cited). The cover was designed by Stafford & Kent, with the seal done by P. Waterman, both of Calgary. The claimed staff of 16 came from across Western Canada, with correspondents in British Columbia (Vancouver); Alberta (Calgary, Edmonton, and Lethbridge); Saskatchewan (Moose Jaw and Regina); and Manitoba (Winnipeg).

The first issue included a half-page advertisement for kosher for Passover spirits, providing an early indication of the concern for kashrut in the Calgary area.

== Publication dates ==
There is only one known surviving issue (Volume I, Number 1) of The Canadian Western Jewish Times. The precise date of the final issue is uncertain.
