= Coquitlam Now =

Canadian newspaper

- Type: Biweekly newspaper
- Format: Tabloid
- Owner: Glacier Media
- Publisher: Ryan McAdams
- Editor: Leneen Robb
- Founded: 1984
- Language: English
- Headquarters: Coquitlam, BC
- Circulation: 54,661
- Website: thenownews.com

Coquitlam Now was a bi-weekly community newspaper, based in Coquitlam, and served the Tri-Cities region of British Columbia's Lower Mainland from 1984 to 2016. The Coquitlam Now is no longer in circulation.

The paper was part of the Van-Net chain owned by Glacier Media Group.

== See also ==
- List of newspapers in Canada
