= Das Echo =

German-language newspaper in Canada

- April 2008 front page
- Type: Monthly newspaper
- Format: Berliner (format)
- Owner(s): independent
- Founder(s): Paul Christian Walter
- Editor-in-chief: Paul Christian Walter
- Founded: 1978
- Political alignment: Canadian Federalism, has both Conservative and Liberal columnists
- Language: German
- Ceased publication: 2022
- Headquarters: Montreal, Quebec, Canada
- ISSN: 1182-3100
- Website: annymueller.com/dasecho/indexEN.shtml

Das Echo was a monthly German-language newspaper originally based in Montreal, Quebec, Canada, serving the German-speaking community in Canada and the United States from 1978 to 2022.

== History ==
Das Echo began as the Das Echo des Deutschen Hauses für die deutsch-kanadische Gemeinschaft, founded by Paul Christian Walter in 1978. It first began printing as a quarterly newssheet for the German community in Greater Montreal. Like the majority of newspapers in Germany, it was a subscription publication with a comparably small number of freely-sold issues. Das Echo and the Deutsche Rundschau were the only newspapers by an ethnic minority (German) in Canada to have stringers in most Canadian provinces and many European countries.

Das Echo faced the delocalization of its readers from Montreal and the rest of Quebec to other Canadian provinces. Like their English-speaking neighbours, many German-speaking Quebecers left the province because of the political turmoil and changes that followed the Quiet Revolution. In 1979 Walter turned the news sheet into a bimonthly newspaper and two years later it became a monthly newspaper, reporting about the activities of and covering information for the German-speaking communities in the Canadian provinces. In 1982, the title was finally shortened to Das Echo featuring the subtitle von Küste zu Küste, meaning from coast to coast.

From 1984 to 1995 Das Echo experienced a period of extensive growth, exceeding a circulation of 80,000. The newspaper established itself as an independent source of information in central European affairs in North America. Beginning in the mid-1990s, Das Echo earned a steadily growing number of subscriptions from the United States.

A substantial loss of subscriptions during the late 1990s and early years of the new millennium forced the Walter family into restructuring to avoid a financial collapse; the result was more advertising in the newspaper in order to keep a low retail price. On the other hand, the editorial staff was required to reorient the paper towards its traditional central theme of German-Canadian affairs, to reinforce its distinguishing character as a German-Canadian newspaper.

In about 2006, Das Echo started recovering subscription numbers, growing to an average monthly readership of about 100,000. The paper remained one of the largest nationwide German-language newspaper in Canada and the United States until its demise. Its largest regional readership was found in the Canadian prairie provinces of Alberta, Saskatchewan and Manitoba, provinces with high populations of ethnic Germans. In 2012, Das Echo received the award of the National Ethnic Press and Media Council of Canada.

In January 2022, with its founder and longtime editor-in-chief Paul Christian Walter falling seriously ill, Das Echo produced its last issue and permanently closed.

Das Echo was a member of the globally active IMH network, the International Association of German Media (IDM), the National Ethnic Press & Media Council of Canada, dpa, APA, SDA and swissinfo.

== See also ==
- List of newspapers in Canada
