= De Nederlandse Courant =

Newspaper in Southern Ontario, Canada

- Editor: Tom Bijvoet
- Categories: Ethnic newspaper
- Frequency: Monthly
- Circulation: 6000
- Publisher: Mokeham Publishing Inc.
- First issue: 1953
- Company: Mokeham Publishing Inc.
- Country: Canada
- Based in: Oakville, Ontario
- Language: Dutch
- Website: www.dekrant.biz

De Nederlandse Courant was a newspaper for Dutch immigrants to Southern Ontario, Canada. Until 2012 it was published by 'The Dutch Canadian Bi-Weekly Inc.' of Burlington, Ontario. After January 2013 it was published by 'The Dutch Newspaper Inc.' of Grimsby, Ontario. It was printed in a tabloid newspaper format. Reduced ad volume and declining readership forced the paper to cut the number of annual issues from 26 to 17 in 2014 and further down to 12 in 2015.

De Nederlandse Courant used to relay a selection of Dutch news articles taken from the De Telegraaf newspaper of the Netherlands. Additionally it brought news about institutions catering to the aging population of Dutch-Canadians who immigrated to Ontario in the 1940s, 1950s and 1960s, such as The Netherlands Luncheon Club, veterans' associations and card clubs.

Canada's oldest Dutch newspaper, De Nederlandse Courant was first published in 1953. In 2018 it folded and was co-opted into Maandblad de Krant, the only remaining Dutch language periodical in North America.

== See also ==
- List of newspapers in Canada
