= The Essex/Windsor Record =

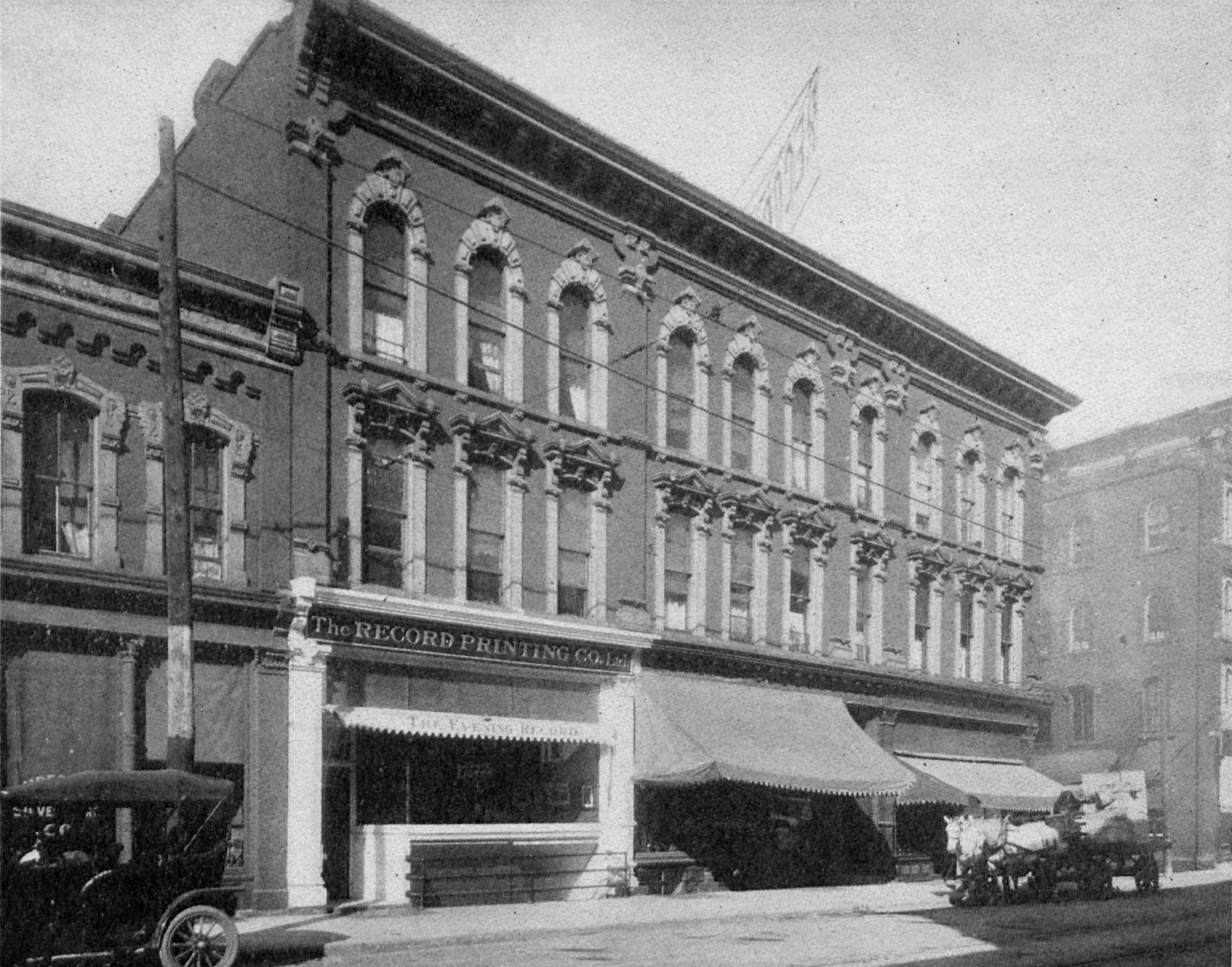
- Headquarters of the Windsor Record, 1913
- Type: Weekly newspaper
- Founded: 1861
- Ceased publication: 1917
- City: Windsor, Ontario

The Essex, later Windsor Record was a weekly newspaper in Windsor, Ontario, Canada from 1861 until 1888, and then until 1917 as the Windsor Record.

== History ==
Patrick Gammie Laurie was born April 7, 1833, in New Pitsligo, Scotland. Before coming to the Windsor area, his family arrived in Toronto in November 1842, passing through Cobourg and settling in Brantford. He spent ten years working on a newspaper in Sydenham. During this time he met his wife Mary Elizabeth Carney, daughter of owner of the Sydenham paper. At the age of 22 he purchased the Owen Sound Times in 1855, selling it four years later. For two years he went back and forth between Windsor and Detroit working as a printer, until he acquired the Essex Record in 1861. Laurie published the paper until 1869, when he left for Manitoba. Working for various provincial papers such as the Liberal and Manitoba Free Press over many years, he next set off for Battleford, Saskatchewan in June 1878. A 650-mile journey made with an ox-cart carrying a printing press, Laurie would launch the Saskatchewan Herald on arrival, serving as editor and proprietor for the next 25 years until his death on May 11, 1903.

Laurie would sell the Record to Alexander Cameron in 1869, only to have the offices destroyed by a fire a year later. It was then re-established by Stephen Lusted, who was born in England in 1834, and arrived in Ontario in 1842. His printing career began at 11 as an apprentice to John F. Rodgers, publisher of Woodstock's The Monarch. After three years he departed, and spent another three with the British American, and at positions throughout Brantford, St. Thomas, Chatham and Ann Arbor, Michigan. After another several years as foreman of the Woodstock Times, Lusted came to Windsor in 1865. A daily edition of the paper was attempted in 1877, but would only last two months. Lusted was with the Record until 1882, having been appointed Town Clerk of Windsor in 1880.

In 1882, the paper was being published from Sandwich Street's Opera Block. Lusted ended his tenure with the Record on November 9, 1882, passing control to James and John Barr, their father Robert Sr. having purchased the paper. Brothers James, John, and William were at the Record, the former two having spent time with the Detroit Free Press and brother Robert, a columnist and editor there. The paper was operated by the Barr family, who sold it to Wallace Graham in 1890, and soon after the paper was transferred to Archibald McNee. McNee, later with John A. McKay, would establish a weekly and daily papers, renaming the Essex the Windsor Record.

== See also ==
- List of newspapers in Canada
