= StarMetro (newspaper) =

Defunct chain of Canadian free daily newspapers

- "Investigate. Report. Effect Change."

- A portion of the April 10, 2018, front page of StarMetro Edmonton
- Type: Free daily newspaper
- Format: Compact
- Owner(s): Torstar (90%); Metro International (10%)
- Founded: 2000; 26 years ago
- Ceased publication: December 20, 2019
- Political alignment: Social liberalism
- Language: English
- Headquarters: Toronto
- Country: Canada
- Sister newspapers: Toronto Star
- Website: www.thestar.com

StarMetro was a chain of Canadian free daily newspapers published in Calgary, Edmonton, Halifax, Toronto, and Vancouver. The chain was a joint venture between the Canadian publishing conglomerate Torstar (90 per cent) and Swedish global media company Metro International (10 per cent). The chain was originally branded as Metro prior to rebranding on April 10, 2018. StarMetro was not affiliated with the French-language Métro newspaper published by TC Transcontinental in Montreal.

In November 2019, Torstar announced that all StarMetro editions would cease publication on December 20, 2019.

== As Metro ==
The first Canadian newspaper owned by Metro International was launched in Toronto in 2000. The launch sparked a newspaper war as two of the city's major dailies, the Toronto Star and Toronto Sun, both responded by producing their own free versions aimed at commuters. Metro Toronto merged with GTA Today, owned by the Toronto Star's parent company Torstar Corporation, in 2001.

Metro International sold 40 of its 50 per cent share in all of its English-language Canadian papers to Torstar on October 14, 2011. The Metro papers in Regina, Saskatoon and London ceased publication in 2014. The chain's operations in Ottawa and Winnipeg were closed in November 2017 as part of an asset swap between Torstar and Postmedia Network that also resulted in the acquisition and closure of the rival 24 Hours chain in English Canada.

== StarMetro rebranding ==
The English-Canadian Metro papers were rebranded to StarMetro on April 10, 2018. As part of the rebranding, online news operations were consolidated with the Toronto Star and the former Metro News website was redirected to the Star's website. The StarMetro chain also officially adopted the same socially liberal, progressive "Atkinson Principles" as the Toronto Star.

== End of print edition ==
Parent company Torstar Corp. announced on November 19, 2019, that StarMetro would be shut down due to a decline in print advertising and the increasing use of smartphones, laptops, and tablets. It said the final print editions in Vancouver, Edmonton, Calgary, Toronto and Halifax would be published on December 20. As a result, 73 employees were laid off in the editorial, advertising and distribution departments. Instead, the Toronto Star planned to open digital bureaus with five reporters each in the cities where StarMetro was published, with the exception of Toronto.
