= Westman Journal =

- Type: Weekly newspaper
- Founder(s): Bruce Penton
- Publisher: Nancy Johnson
- Editor: Brandi Pollock
- Founded: April 2002
- Ceased publication: April 2019
- City: Brandon, Manitoba
- Country: Canada

The Westman Journal, previously known as the Wheat City Journal, was a weekly community newspaper printed in Brandon, Manitoba. Its founder and former publisher is Bruce Penton. It provided Brandon-based, people-oriented news and sports.

== History ==
The paper's first issue was released on April 25, 2002, under the name Wheat City Journal. In 2004, the Wheat City Journal was purchased by Glacier Media. In 2009, the paper's name was changed to the Westman Journal. It ceased its operations on April 29, 2019.
