= Leifur Magnusson =

Icelandic American economist

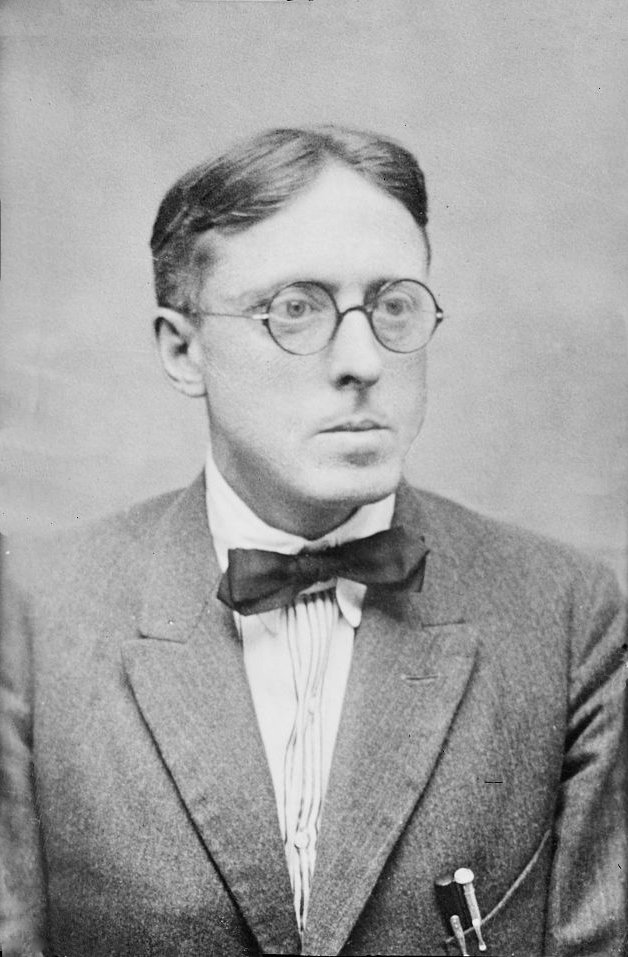
- Born: July 7, 1882; Iceland
- Died: February 15, 1960 (aged 77); Claremont, California, U.S.
- Occupation: Economist
- Employer(s): Bureau of Labor Statistics, International Labour Organization

Leifur Magnusson (7 July 1882 – 15 February 1960) was an Icelandic American economist with the Bureau of Labor Statistics and the International Labour Organization.

== Biography ==
He was born in Iceland on 7 July 1882. He died in a traffic accident in Claremont, California on 15 February 1960.
