= Lo Stivale (newspaper) =

Italian newspaper published in Alberta, Canada

- Front page of the first issue of Lo Stivale
- Type: Fortnightly newspaper
- Format: Tabloid
- Owner(s): Lo Stivale Graphics, Ltd.
- Publisher: Frank Longinotti
- Editor: Ignazio Lobasso
- Founded: April 19, 1984
- Ceased publication: Unknown
- Headquarters: Calgary, Alberta; Canada
- Price: 25 cents

Lo Stivale: Periodico d’informazione, Cultura e Sport per gli italiani dell’Alberta was an Italian-language newspaper published in Alberta.

== Background ==
Canada’s first Italian newspaper dates to the late 19th Century; after 1950, Italian publications became increasingly common across the country. Lo Stivale’s appearance in 1984 may be traced to the confluence of several notable developments in that province’s history. It coincided with a boom period for community newspapers in Canada; with an economic explosion in Alberta; with the centenary of the founding of the city of Calgary that year; with the 1981 Canadian census returns’ ranking of Alberta with the country’s fourth largest population of Italian origin; and with the designation of Calgary in September 1981 as the locale for the 1988 Winter Olympics.

== Publishing history ==
=== Content and design ===
Lo Stivale ("The Boot") was launched by Lo Stivale Graphics, Ltd., of Calgary on April 19, 1984. Written entirely in Italian, it was an independent, fee-based newspaper reaching "the Italian community of Calgary" every other Thursday, covering news, culture and sports (including the local scene).

Lo Stivale initially had a staff of six, headed by publisher Frank Longinotti and Managing Editor Ignazio Lobasso. Lobasso had 12 years of newspaper experience with a Toronto Italian daily, and was also responsible for the graphics and design. The typesetting and camera work for at least the first 11 issues were output by The Jewish Star, another Calgary community newspaper.

Lo Stivale’s "prima edizione" of 12 pages in a 6-column, tabloid-sized newspaper, used a single blue spot-color and consisted entirely of newly typeset material. It had an advertising content of approximately 33 percent. Graphically, the newspaper was characterized as "one of the prettiest ... European-style, and first-class."

=== Prices and subscriptions ===
Initially the single-copy price was 65 cents, with subscriptions offered for periods of one year ($20) and two years ($36). By the sixth issue, photo-offset text material began to be used, and by the eighth issue of publication the newspaper was granted a second-class mailing permit. At that time, the single-copy price fell to 25 cents.

=== Legacy ===
There are few surviving copies of Lo Stivale, and it is not known when the newspaper ceased publication.
