= The Delhi News-Record =

Canadian newspaper

- Type: Daily newspaper
- Format: Tabloid
- Owner: Postmedia Network
- Language: English
- Headquarters: Delhi, Ontario
- Website: http://www.delhinewsrecord.com/

The Delhi News-Record is a newspaper owned by Postmedia Network that serves the area surrounding the community of Delhi in Norfolk County, Ontario, Canada.

== See also ==
- List of newspapers in Canada
