= Jack Canuck =

Canadian tabloid newspaper

- Type: Tabloid newspaper
- Founder(s): J. R. Rogers; Louisa Rogers
- Founded: July 29, 1911
- Ceased publication: September 13, 1924 (original publication)
- Language: English
- City: Toronto
- Country: Canada

Jack Canuck was a Canadian tabloid newspaper founded in Toronto by J. R. Rogers and his wife Louisa Rogers. First published on July 29, 1911, as a biweekly, it became a weekly in February 1912. The newspaper covered politics, crime, social issues and gossip, and circulated beyond Toronto.

Jack Canuck was among the early English-language tabloid newspapers published in Canada. In the years immediately following the First World War, its average weekly circulation was reported to be approximately 65,000 copies, with sales in Ontario, western Canada and the northern United States. Historians Susan E. Houston and Patrick J. Connor have identified the newspaper as a contributor to the development of English-language tabloid journalism in Toronto.

== History ==
The newspaper was established following the death of the Rogerses' son in a Toronto isolation hospital in 1910. J. R. Rogers criticized the city's public-health system and campaigned through the newspaper on issues including infant mortality, vaccination, working conditions and municipal government. Its motto was "Truth and Justice".

Jack Canuck published police-court reports, personal gossip and mining-stock tips, as well as articles alleging corruption and exploitation. It employed correspondents outside Toronto. Its reporting and personal attacks resulted in libel actions and complaints to provincial authorities.

J. R. Rogers died in the sinking of the Lusitania in May 1915 while travelling to Europe to report on conditions facing Canadian soldiers during the First World War. Louisa Rogers continued publishing the newspaper after his death.

In the years following the war, Jack Canuck had an average weekly circulation of approximately 65,000 copies. Its readership extended across Ontario, western Canada and into the northern United States.

Louisa Rogers remained proprietor until September 1924. The final issue of the original newspaper appeared on September 13, 1924, and the publishing business entered bankruptcy in January 1925.

== Revival ==
The title was revived after Hanmer Burt Lloyd and Samuel Lichtman incorporated the McCaul Publishing Company in 1933. Peter Brown subsequently took control of the company and served as editor and publisher. The revived Jack Canuck described itself as "Canada's First Tabloid Newspaper" and was still being published in 1937.
