= The York Commonwealth =

- Let Sound Reason weigh more with us than Popular Opinion - As the "York Herald: Aurora and Richmond Hill Advertiser and Advocate"
- Type: Weekly newspaper
- Founder: William Trudgeon
- Founded: 1857
- Ceased publication: 1890
- City: York, Ontario

The York Commonwealth, also known as the York Herald from 1859, was a weekly newspaper published in York, Toronto, Ontario from June 12, 1857 to 1890.

== History ==
=== 1850s ===
The York Ridings Gazette and Richmond Hill Advertiser published its first edition in 1857 with William Trudgeon as manager and editor. He proclaimed the paper's mission with this quote in its opening pages.

"With or without offence to friends or foes / We sketch the world just as it goes."

— Lord George Gordon Byron, Don Juan, First edition of the York Commonwealth

A prospectus stated his paper's politics would be "eminently and emphatically British in their Conservatism". He was known in the area as the leader of Turgeon's Masonic Band and President of the Yonge Street Agricultural Society in 1849. He died in Stouffville, July 11, 1899.

Local economic and political issues forced the paper to adopt changes in its title, ownership and a political shift to a Liberal viewpoint over the first two years. By December 1858, the ownership is listed as Alexander Scott. On March 25, 1859, new editor and proprietor Captain Malcolm McLeod laid out his prospectus, followed by a change in title on April 8 to the York Herald. MacLeod would not last though, after tangling with Theodore Walworth, local doctor & politician John Duncumb over libel and slander. The previous February 12, Walworth had given a lecture on his time spent in Crimea as an Assistant Surgeon with the second Battalion of the Rifle Brigade. In the following week's issue, local long-serving Postmaster Matthew Keefy wrote in to dispute Walworth's military service against the published records of the War Office, having served in the areas mentioned by Walworth. By May, a Captain L. W. Millies of the same Battalion had written letter labelling Walworth a deserter. This was followed by a burning in effigy of the editor through the street, at which Trudgeon's Brass Band played unknowingly. MacLeod disposed of his interest in the paper in a letter dated June 10.

=== 1860s ===
The publisher Alexander Scott, who hosted the Richmond Hill Library Association's book collection in the Herald’s offices in 1871, and was their Chief Librarian from 1862-1865. The paper suspended publication in 1863 until 1865, starting back up under Scott. This was due to, according to local historian William Harrison, "the editor got sulky", while the job printing plant continued on until the paper resurfaced in 1865. Scott continued publishing the paper for another decade, relinquishing his position on June 1 of 1867.

=== 1870s ===
Up to the incorporation of Richmond Hill in 1873, the paper touted the concept with such benefits as, “no loose planks to trip up the unwary; no pigs, geese or other nuisances would be allowed on the streets.” The paper had a heavy focus on foreign news, agricultural advice, and front page literature. In 1876, Scott is joined by M. H. "Joe" Keefler, a member of the Masonic order, who becomes the sole proprietor in time.

=== 1890s ===
The paper ceased publication in 1890, the final issue featured a large sale to clear out the offices, everything from Fancy Goods to Chinese Garden Powder. It relocated to Weston from its Yonge Street offices and became the Weston York Times.

== See also ==
- List of newspapers in Canada
