= The Tecumseh Tribune =

- Tecumseh Tribune cover, June 9, 1959
- Type: Weekly newspaper
- Founder(s): Lucien “Kit” Lacasse and Henry F. Hayes
- Founded: 1959
- Ceased publication: January 2012
- City: Tecumseh, Ontario
- ISSN: 1706-452X
- Website: thetribune.ca

The Tecumseh Tribune was a weekly newspaper published in Tecumseh, Ontario, from 1864 to 2012.

== History ==
The Tecumseh Tribune began in 1959 under the ownership of Lucien “Kit” Lacasse and Henry F. Hayes. Both the Lacasse and Hayes families were long time members of the community. Dr. Gustave Lacasse was mayor of Tecumseh from 1928 - 1929, Hector Lacasse also wrote editorials for the paper, “Armchair Critic” by “Hec-que-tor” and was mayor from 1966 - 1970 as well as Deputy Reeve to George Hayes. Kit's brother Joe also joined the paper in 1979, and family member Paul Lacasse wrote front-page articles in the 1990s. Jean-Marc Lacasse would write multi-page articles on his tumultuous canoe trips in Manitoba and Northern Ontario during the 1980s, complete with great photos and drawings.

Lucien was born July 14, 1931, and died on February 16, 1991. During his life he stood as an Essex North NDP candidate, and as a Christian never shied away from helping those in the community or expressing his opinions in decades of editorials. “Kit” wrote front-page articles and his “One Man’s Opinion” column, where not even his own family in politics were immune to an editorial, like calling out Mayor Lacasse or referring to the town council's record as “the year of the Jackass”. Today one can walk down Lacasse Boulevard to take a swim in Lacasse Park. Lucien started the Tribune Printing Company in 1953, and it continues today as Lacasse SPG.

Henry Frederick Hayes was born on February 25, 1920, and died on May 8, 2015. Henry had been a member of Royal Canadian Air Force during World War II, and during his life was a member of the Council of Canadians and a Tecumseh Town Councillor involved in building of the first public library and new Town Hall.

Local historians will be interested in a January 31, 1984, article detailing the history of Tecumseh's other well-known family, the Cadas, who have been deeply involved in governance since 1914.

The paper was primarily in English, but featured French language columns owing to the town's Franco-Ontarian origins. A regular advertiser in the paper was Green Giant of Canada, a major employer in the area, whose offices were directly across from the 1970s location of the Tribune on 13012 Tecumseh Road. The October 25th, 1973 issue of the paper featured photos from a giant fire that ravaged the plant, a huge story literally at the doorstop of the offices. The paper was later moved to the Dunn Publishing location at 1415 Lesperance Road in March 2010. The local Cornfest always made front-page news, a favourite phrase being, “It's EAR-RESISTIBLE!” The paper historically served the communities of St. Clair Beach, East Riverside, Emeryville, Forest Glade and parts of Maidstone and Sandwich South Townships. Circulation hovered around 3,000 in the 1960s, 12-15,000 during the 1990s, raising as high as 20,000 during Ronald Dunn's tenure.

After Lucien's death in 1991, family member Michelle (Lacasse) Friesen took over as editor and manager. Two years later Clarence (1937 - 2015) and Isabelle Lesperance of Lesperance Graphics purchased the paper, introducing process colour and a biweekly publishing schedule. Marilyn Lesperance took over publishing and managing editor, later on Clarence and Isabelle's daughter Cheryl Hardcastle assumed the position of editor. Family member Julianne also wrote an “FYI” column for the paper, as well as Isabelle Lesperance and Paul Lacasse. In January 2008, Cheryl continued her position under the new owners, Dunn Publishing and Ronald Dunn. The paper came to a close in January 2012 due to financial difficulties, with Cheryl moving on to Deputy Mayor of Tecumseh and as the NDP Member of Parliament for Windsor-Tecumseh. Ron continued his work with the Windsor Downtown Mission as Director of Development and Community Relations.

== See also ==
- List of newspapers in Canada
