= Okanagan Advertiser =

Former Canadian newspaper

- Type: Weekly newspaper
- Founded: 1902
- Ceased publication: April 27, 2023
- Language: English
- Headquarters: Armstrong, British Columbia, Canada
- Website: Site archive June 1, 2023

Okanagan Advertiser, formerly Armstrong Advertiser, was a newspaper in Armstrong, British Columbia, published weekly on Thursday. The paper had a circulation of 4,000 and founded in 1902. It served the Armstrong, Enderby and Spallumcheen area. The paper published its last issue on April 27, 2023.

== See also ==
- List of newspapers in Canada
