= Jasper Booster =

- Type: Weekly newspaper
- Format: Tabloid
- Owner: Sun Media
- Publisher: Sonia Germain
- Editor: Brigitte Petersen
- Founded: 1963
- Headquarters: Jasper, Alberta
- Circulation: 3000
- Website: www.jasperbooster.com

The Jasper Booster was a weekly newspaper published on Wednesdays, serving the Jasper, Alberta area. It was founded in 1963, and was the first to report news in Jasper.

The Jasper Booster team created many complementary publications over the years. The Jasper Telephone Directory, Jasper Food Guide, Jasper in Winter and Summer Magazines, and Jasper Map were original creations of the Jasper Booster staff. Many special sections were also published every week, and were also original creation of the Booster staff during its close to 50 years of existence: Small Business Week, Minor Hockey Week, Jasper in January, Moonlight Madness, and Fire Safety Week are only a few examples of those special sections.

In January 2001, the Jasper Booster was completely re-designed and changed from a paid ($1.25) to a free publication as a reaction to the new free monthly publication 'The Jasper Wildlife'. Readership increased from 600 to 3000 but only after 'The Jasper Wildlife' was dissolved in a mass satellite paper offloading by parent company The Financial Post, mid 2001.

== End of publication ==
In March 2009, the Sun Media paper was shut down after 46 years of publishing. This closure represented one of many, as Sun Media announced in December 2008 that it was cutting 600 jobs in Quebec, Ontario and Western Canada, due to the economic recession. The official Sun Media press release, printed in the Booster's last edition, is as follows:

Booster closes its doors

Newspaper served Jasper for 46 years

Sun Media

After 46 years of publication, Wednesday, March 11 is the final edition of the Jasper Booster, Sun Media has announced. Due to increasing challenges in the newspaper industry, shrinking advertising revenues and rising costs, it has been determined that the continuation of publication is no longer viable.

"It was a very difficult decision to cease publication in such a wonderful and picturesque community, but the reality is, the business model no longer made sense in the current economic environment," said Craig Martin, executive vice-president of operations for Western Canada. "We would like to thank our loyal advertisers, readers, and employees for their years of continuous support," wrote Martin in a news release.

Brigitte Petersen, Booster Editor at the time of closure, wrote her goodbye message in a column published in the last edition, in which she stated: "Having two local newspapers competing for advertising in this small town and covering the same events was often unnecessary and what could be called overkill," she wrote. "On the other hand, it can benefit a community to have a couple of media choices in town to avoid complacent reporting and over-charged advertisers."

Sonia Germain, Booster Publisher at the time of closure, also wrote a goodbye column in which she thanked the community for its support and stated: "On March 11 the door of the Jasper Booster office will be closed, but the memories created by this community newspaper will remain forever. There will be lots to remember."

== See also ==
- List of newspapers in Canada
