= Regina Sun =

The Regina Sun, later known as the Sunday Post, was a weekly community-oriented newspaper published by the Regina Leader-Post, the daily newspaper in Regina, Saskatchewan, Canada. It was delivered free to all homes in Regina and surrounding area until 2015. It began publication in 1983.

As of 2010, it had a circulation of 86,600.

== See also ==
- List of newspapers in Canada
