= The Nova Scotia Gleaner =

African-Canadian newspaper

- Categories: Newspaper
- Frequency: Monthly
- Format: Broadsheet
- Founder: Frederick Allan Hamilton
- Founded: 1929
- First issue: August 1929
- Country: Canada
- Based in: Sydney, Nova Scotia
- Language: English

The Nova Scotia Gleaner was a monthly periodical that was established in 1929 in Sydney, Nova Scotia as the province's second African-Canadian newsmagazine.

== History ==
After moving to Nova Scotia from Tobago, Frederick Allan Hamilton eventually earned a degree from Dalhousie University, then returned to Cape Breton to practice law. In August 1929, the first issue of The Nova Scotia Gleaner was published in Sydney, Nova Scotia and edited by the Sydney lawyer.

The publication is described as three double-sided pages long and included local and regional news, community notes, political commentary, job openings, and other ads. The newspaper supported activism and covered stories that affected African Nova Scotian communities around the province.
