= The Monitor (Montreal) =

Newspaper in Montreal, Canada

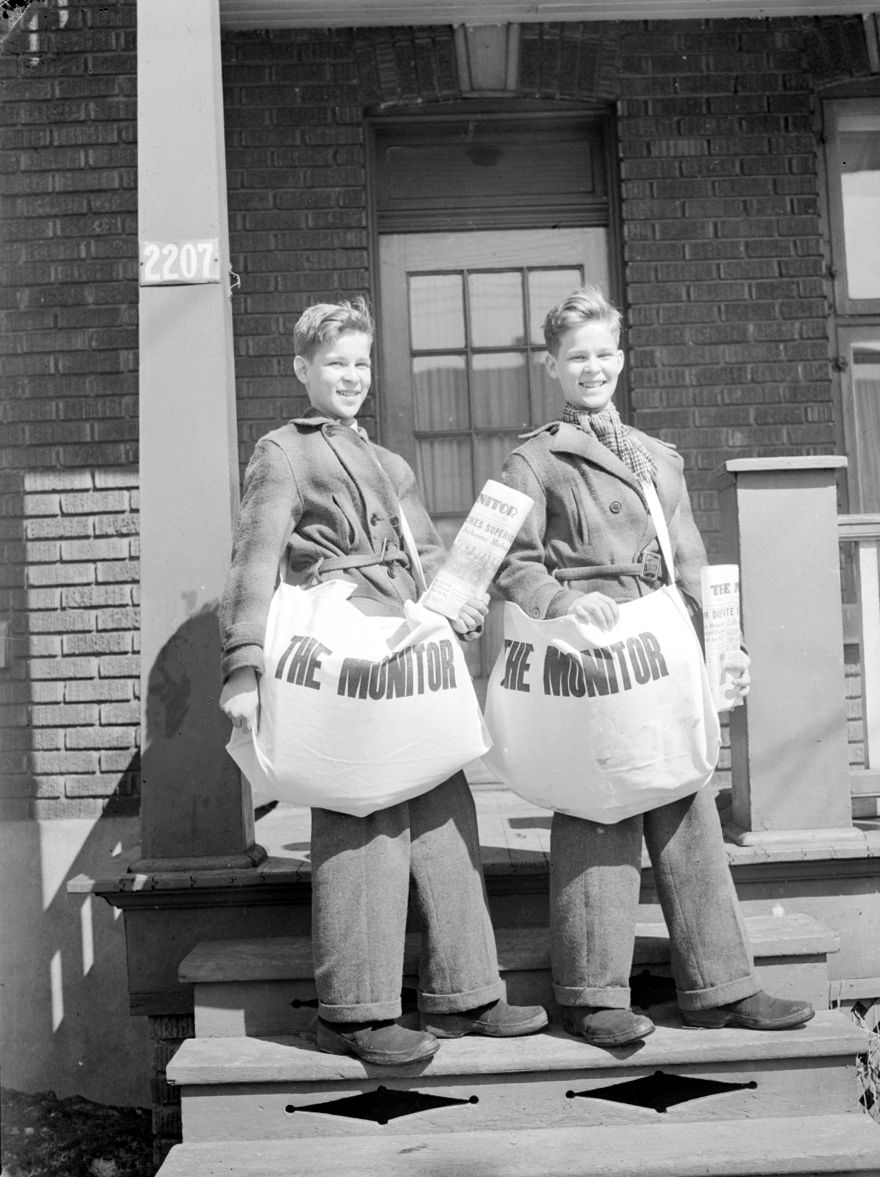
- Newspaper carriers for The Monitor in 1943
- Founded: 1926
- Ceased publication: 2009
- Language: English
- Headquarters: Montreal, Quebec, Canada
- Circulation: 35,000

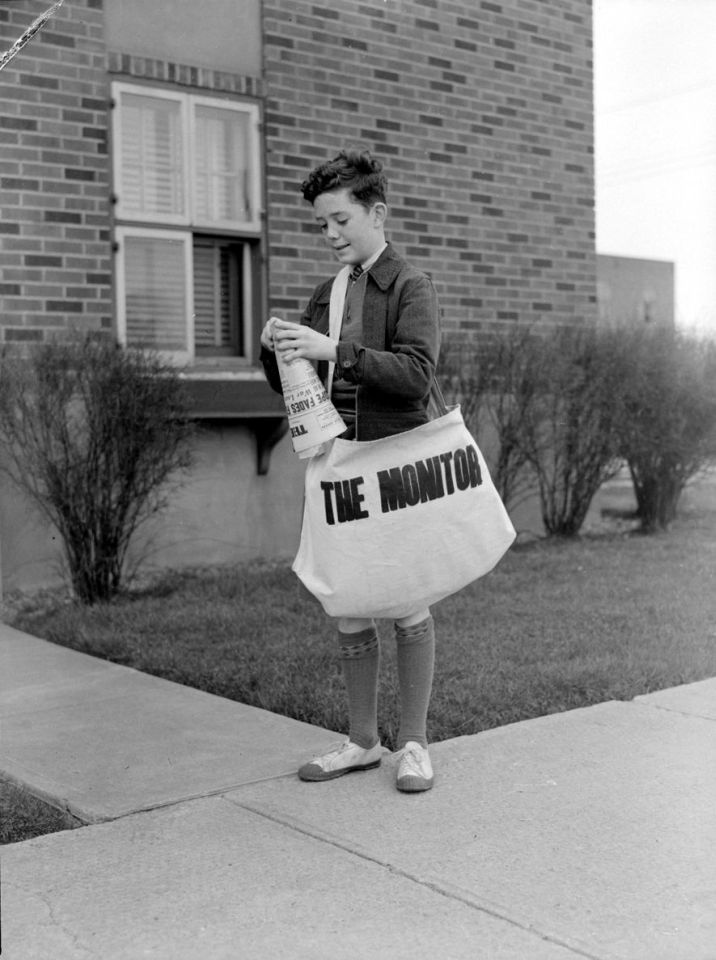
Newspaper carriers John Murray for The Monitor in 1943

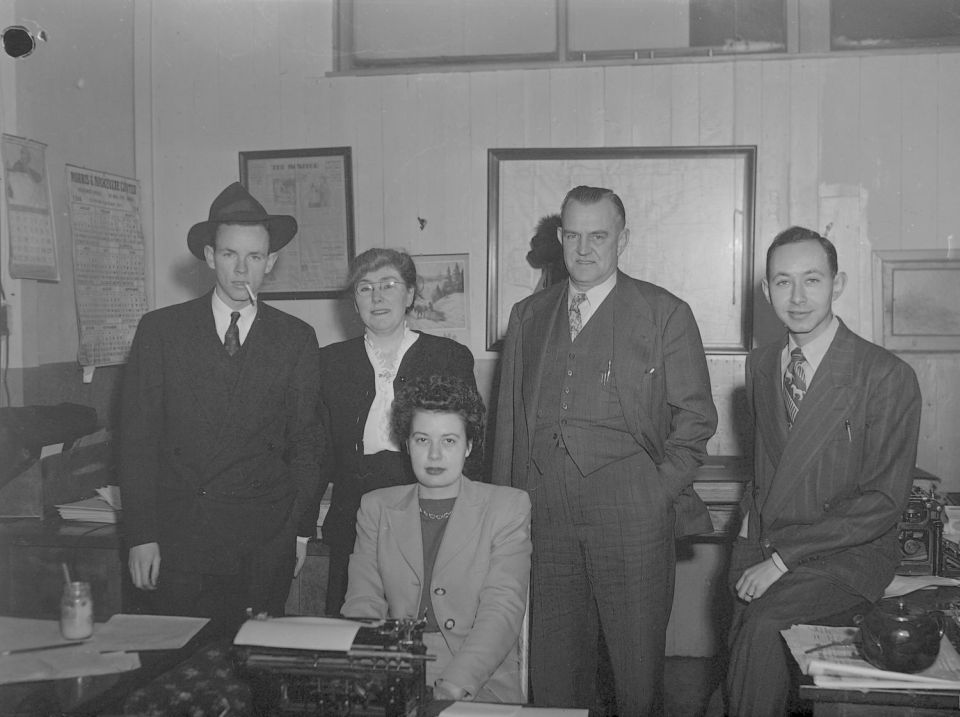
Editorial Board 1948

The Monitor (also briefly known as the West End Chronicle) was an English-language online newspaper based in Montreal, Quebec, Canada.

Formerly a weekly newspaper serving the West End Montreal communities of Notre-Dame-de-Grâce, Hampstead, Côte Saint-Luc and Montreal West, it published its final print edition on February 5, 2009. Launched in 1926, the paper was bought by Transcontinental in 1996. It had a circulation of 35,000.

In order to cut costs, Transcontinental had reduced staff and attempted to share content and design with its other publications, even briefly renaming the Monitor the West End Chronicle, after its West Island Chronicle.

== See also ==
- List of newspapers in Canada
