= Montreal Daily News =

- Type: Daily
- Format: Tabloid
- Owner: Quebecor
- Publisher: George MacLaren; James Duff
- Founded: 15 March 1988
- Ceased publication: 15 December 1989
- Language: English
- Headquarters: Montreal, Quebec, Canada
- Website: none

The Montreal Daily News was a short-lived English language Canadian daily newspaper in Quebec. Quebecor founder Pierre Péladeau and British tabloid publisher Robert Maxwell teamed up to launch an English-language newspaper to compete against The Gazette. The newspaper was published in a tabloid sized format, instead of broadsheet sized.

Its first issue was distributed 15 March 1988.

The arrival of the paper resulted in the return of Sunday editions to Montreal's English language newspaper community for the first time since the closure of the Sunday Express in 1985. In order to compete against the Montreal Daily News' Sunday edition, the Montreal Gazette started to publish one as well.

But late in 1989, reports of losses and failure to attain circulation goals led to rumours of the paper's impending demise. In November that year, Péladeau indicated that the paper's survival would depend on either a substantial increase in paid circulation, or a buyer. Original publisher George MacLaren had given way to James Duff, who in turn was dismissed in August. Quebecor finally closed the Montreal Daily News, with its last issue published 15 December 1989.

The legacy of the Montreal Daily News was the existence of Sunday editions in Montreal though all of them have ceased.

== Notable persons ==
- L. Ian MacDonald (born 1947) – columnist

== See also ==
- List of Quebec media
- List of newspapers in Canada

Montreal newspapers:

- The Gazette
- La Presse
- Le Journal de Montréal
- Le Devoir
- The Montreal Star (defunct)
