= The Kingsville Reporter =

Kingsville Reporter
- Type: Weekly newspaper
- Owner: Postmedia Network
- Founder: Sydney Arthur King
- Founded: 1873
- Ceased publication: May 4, 2020
- City: Kingsville, Ontario

The Kingsville Reporter was a weekly newspaper published in Kingsville, Ontario, Canada. Owned by Postmedia Network, it published papers every Tuesday.

== History ==
The Kingsville Reporter origins are somewhat hazy, but most agree that the paper began in 1873 with S. A. King, son of the town's namesake Colonel James King. Born on January 23, 1844, Sydney Arthur King received his medical degree from Victoria College in 1866, marrying Esther Wigle, daughter of Member of Parliament Solomon Wigle, in the early 1870s. Some documents point to an A. C. McLellan having a senior position at the paper in 1876, as well as an 1880 issue listing R. A. Hughes as publisher. King would be involved with the paper until 1889, dying in 1907. King had numerous business interests during his life, including the Wheeler Steamship Co., Manitoulin Lumber Co., numerous oil/gas companies and was the first president of the Detroit River Railroad in 1889. He was a Conservative politically, served as Reeve of Kingsville for eight years, and a prominent member of the Church of England.

S. T. Corpus would take over in 1889 as editor and publisher, a village clerk of Kingsville. Corpus would only be around until 1893, when he left to follow King into the lucrative natural gas business, stemming from discoveries made during King's overseeing of construction of Hiram Walker’s summer hotel, The Mettawas. Walker and King were also directors of the Lake Erie Navigation Co.

The paper historically served the communities of Kingsville, Barretville, Arner, Cottam, Ruthven, New California, 4th Concession, Leamington, Amherstburg, Zion, Leamington, Gosfield, North Ridge, Arner, Salem, Trinity, Tilbury, Harrow and Essex. A per annum subscription of $2 garnered an 8 page, 7 column sheet, with a circulation of 500 for the 1,700-person community of Kingsville in the 1920s.

William H. Hellems joined the paper in 1889, after working at the Brantford Expositor and then as the foreman of the Welland Printing and Publishing Company from 1878 to 1883. He then spent four years with the Ridgetown Plaindealer, and another five years with the Essex Liberal, both in the same capacity as with Welland. Hellems was born May 15, 1856 in Kelvin, Norfolk County. On April 13, 1881, he married Victoria Buchner, having three daughters. One of those daughters, Bertha, would work as a journalist for the paper and act as the paper’s representative in the delegation of the Canadian Weekly Newspaper Association's tour to England in 1924. A Methodist, Hellems would be a staunch proponent of Prohibition and the Local option, running the paper until 1938 and passing away January 23, 1943.

David P. Connery assumed Hellems' position in 1938, bringing investment to the paper with modern facilities and equipment. During Hellems’ tenure the paper had moved from the north side of Main Street, third street west of Division Street, onto Division Street North in 1921. Two years after Connery joined the paper, they were located on the second floor above a Dominion grocery store on the site, until moving to the current offices at 17 Chestnut Street in 1970. Connery would stay with the paper until October 1941, when the current family ownership would begin.

“Your pen is a dangerous tool. You can cut people to ribbons and cause a great deal of hurt…” - Collin O. Sims

In early 1940s the paper was purchased by Collin O. Sims and William D. Conklin. Conklin (1911–1977) was a barrister and left the paper to become a member of the Ontario Water Resources Committee, acting as an associate editor while with the paper. The two published the paper as Lakeshore Publishers Limited. Sims, a member of the Lions Club, Essex Tourist Association and Chamber of Commerce, acted as editor and publisher until his death in 1978. Upon his passing his wife Mildred (d. 2007) took over as publisher for ten years when their son, Greg, purchased the paper with his wife Rita. Greg is credited with shooting some of the photos for the paper in the 1980s and writing the Grist Gallery column. Greg continued with the paper until 2001, and his wife Rita stayed on after the sale of the paper to Postmedia in 2007. The paper continues to publish with Nelson Santos as editor and mayor of the town in 2016.

Postmedia Network decided to permanently close the Kingsville Reporter newspaper along with several other community papers due to the financial constraints of the COVID-19 pandemic. The final edition was published on May 4, 2020.

== See also ==
- List of newspapers in Canada
