= The Kingston Chronicle & Gazette =

- Nec Rege, Nec Populo, Sed Utroque (Neither for king nor people, but for both)

The Kingston Chronicle & Gazette was a weekly/semi-weekly newspaper published in Kingston, Ontario, Canada from 1833 to 1847.

== History ==
The Chronicle began at the beginning of 1819 under the control of John Alexander Macauley and Alexander John Pringle. Nearing the end of 1818, Stephen Miles, a founder and then current publisher of The Kingston Gazette, had become embroiled with local trouble. A Scottish land agent named Robert Gourley, whose anti-Family Compact views Miles had supported, had become increasingly violent in his dealings with Kingston locals. Miles had withdrawn his support, and felt the man's brunt turned against him. As his entrenchment in the politics of the situation deepen, Miles decided to oust himself and sell his stake to Macauley and Pringle, whom kept him on as printer.

Macauley served as Deputy Postmaster of Kingston and a Justice of the Peace during his time owning and editing the Chronicle. Like Miles, he too had had run-ins with Gourley, and espoused his views in a letter in the Gazette, as well as editorials for the Chronicle. Macauley died in Kingston, August 10, 1857.

On July 1, 1824, the paper was bought by James Macfarlane. Macfarlane amended the title to Kingston Chronicle and Gazette in 1833. The change in name, although likely made for a myriad of reasons, is explained by Macfarlane in the June 29, 1833 issue to avoid confusion with a Jamaican newspaper of the same name.

Macfarlane hired Francis Manning Hill as a partner in 1832, with Hill continuing for two years before withdrawing from paper. Hill and Edward John Barker of the Whig would accuse each other of slander, the former referring to him as “Yankee Hill”. Macfarlane owned and edited the Chronicle until his death on July 29, 1847. Sometime in 1847, the paper merged with the Kingston News to form the Chronicle and News under Samuel Rowland, which would eventually be merged with the Kingston Times to form the News and Times, which would later be rebranded the Standard and merged with the British Whig.

== See also ==
- List of newspapers in Canada
