= Métro (Montreal newspaper) =

Canadian French-language daily newspaper

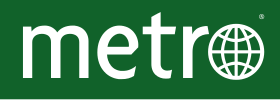
- Type: Free daily newspaper
- Owner: Michael Raffoul
- General manager: Andrew Mulé
- Founded: March 2001; 24 years ago
- Ceased publication: August 11, 2023; 2 years ago
- Language: French
- Headquarters: 101 Marcel Laurin, Saint Laurent, Quebec, H4N 2M3
- City: Montreal, Quebec
- Country: Canada
- Website: journalmetro.com

Métro (also called Métro Montréal or Journal Métro) was a French-language free daily newspaper published in Montreal, Quebec, Canada. The paper was wholly owned by local businessman Michael Raffoul, who owns print media distribution company Transmet. Journal Metro was part of the Metro Media group, which owned several neighbourhood-level and burough-level newspapers in Montreal and in Quebec City. Métro was formerly part of the international group of newspapers Metro International.

== History ==
The paper was founded in 2001, by Montreal-based Transcontinental which licensed the brand from Metro International, itself founded in 1995. It was part of several free Metro papers launched across Canada and in other countries under various licensees.

From its inception in 2001, it held a franchise as the sole French-language free daily newspaper to be distributed inside the Montreal Metro system and STM bus terminals In 2010, Journal Metro lost its franchise to Québecor Média's 24 Heures (originally founded as Métropolitain). Métro regained this privilege in 2016.

In May 2018, TC Media sold the Montreal edition of Metro, along with several other papers, to Michael Raffoul, who in turn contracted TC Media to print the newspapers. These papers became part of the Metro Media group.

In 2018, all the Metro licensees in Canada apart from Montreal were acquired by Torstar Group, publishers of the Toronto Star, and rebranded as StarMetro, though still in collaboration with the Swedish Metro International media group. This left the Montreal paper the only one with the Metro branding in Canada.

In 2019, Torstar announced that all StarMetro papers would cease publication of paper editions, leaving only an online presence, and some employees would be transitioned to the Toronto Star network to handle the remaining online newspaper publication duties. This left the Montreal edition of Métro as the only remaining paper presences of Metro International in Canada.

While considered a daily newspaper, Métro did not publish on Saturday and Sunday, preferring a "weekend edition" published on Friday.

In 2020, amid the financial impact of the COVID-19 pandemic in Quebec, Métro temporarily laid off 40% of its employees and reduced its print edition to Tuesdays, Wednesdays and Fridays. However, all salaried journalists returned to the newsroom later that same year. In addition, the paper suspended physical distribution from 10–31 August 2020. In 2021, Métro underwent a relaunch, adopting a more magazine-like style with local content relating to culture and diversity, entrepreneurship, the environment, and social issues, and a redesigned website and mobile app designed to highlight content from its localized editions. The paper also changed its logo, dropping the Metro International-derived branding to reflect a goal of "bringing Montreal to Montrealers".

On 11 August 2023, general manager Andrew Mulé announced that Métro would suspend all activities effective immediately, citing in particular that Transcontinental's replacement of the Publisac flyer bundle with a smaller booklet (due to a Montreal bylaw prohibiting the door-to-door delivery of flyers in plastic bags) and a lack of support from investors was detrimental to its finances. In September, Métro Média, the paper's publisher, declared bankruptcy.

In December 2023, Métro's brand, equipment and intellectual property were acquired by advertising entrepreneur Pierre-Antoine Fradet. In October 2025, Métro Média announced that it would relaunch Métro as an exclusively digital newspaper relying on artificial intelligence to help write its articles.
