= 24 Hours (newspaper) =

Canadian free daily newspaper

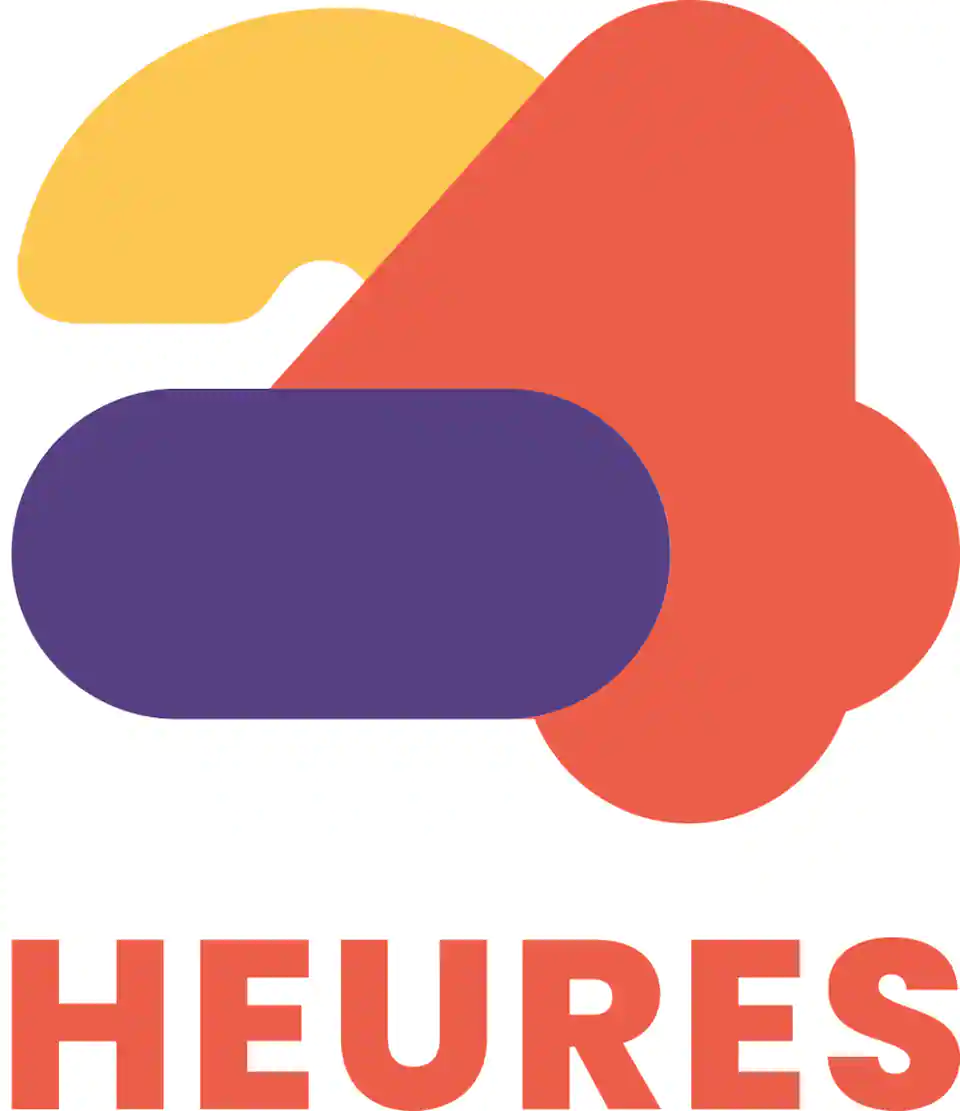
- Type: Daily newspaper
- Language: English, French
- Country: Canada

24 Hours (French: 24 Heures), is a group of English-language and French-language free daily newspapers published in Canada. It was published in French in Montreal and Gatineau, and in English in Calgary, Edmonton, Ottawa, Toronto, and Vancouver. The Gatineau edition was discontinued in 2008 and the Calgary, Edmonton, and Ottawa editions ceased publication in 2013. The Toronto and Vancouver editions were sold to Postmedia Network as part of Quebecor's divestment of English-language news, and they were later acquired by Torstar in an asset swap on November 27, 2017, and immediately shut down in favour of the Torstar-owned Metro papers in those cities (rebranded StarMetro the following year).

The French-language Montreal edition, originally called Métropolitain, became 24 heures in 2005. It is published weekly by Quebecor Media and is the only survivor under the name after folding of all the other Canadian editions. In 2021, it re-launched as a print weekly. The newspaper also underwent a major redesign with the title change to 24, and in early February 2021, its website and logo were redesigned.

== History ==
In 2000, Metro International launched its free daily Metro newspaper in Toronto, eventually expanding with local editions across Canada. In Toronto, the Toronto Sun and Toronto Star scrambled to launch their own free dailies, Sun Media's FYI Toronto and Torstar's GTA Today. In mid-2001, GTA Today had merged with Metro and in October of the same year Sun Media ceased publication of FYI Toronto. However, as the Toronto Sun itself had been largely dependent on sales to commuters the success of Metro ate into its market share and in 2003, Sun Media re-entered the giveaway market with the launch of 24 Hours in Toronto.

The Montreal French-language paper was originally called "Metropolitain" (English: "Metropolitan") and had a large lowercase "m" as its logo, before becoming 24 Heures in 2005.

On November 14, 2006, 24 Hours launched two new editions in the Ottawa–Gatineau area—an English edition published in Ottawa, and a French edition published in Gatineau. The Gatineau version stopped publishing on May 9, 2008.

The Vancouver edition of 24 Hours was a joint venture of Sun Media and the Jim Pattison Group; Pattison sold his share of the Vancouver edition in 2007.

In fall 2009, 24 Hours and 24 Heures were given an extensive makeover. The paper was given the alternative name 24H; while 24H is short-form for "24 Hours" in French, the name was applied to all editions. The paper's colour scheme changed for the Montreal edition, from black and yellow to blue and orange, to match the other editions' colours.

As of January 3, 2011, the Montreal edition of 24 H had reached an agreement with the Société de transport de Montréal (STM) for exclusive distribution in the underground Montreal métro network, replacing the Metro newspaper.

On November 27, 2017, the Toronto and Vancouver editions were acquired by Torstar during Torstar-Postmedia swap deal and were immediately shut down and merged into the Torstar owned Metro and rebranded as StarMetro before shutting down in 2019. The sale was part of a trade between Torstar and Postmedia, in which more than forty local newspapers changed ownership, with several closing. As a result of the trade and closures, the Competition Bureau began an investigation into violations of the Competition Act and raided the offices of Postmedia and Torstar to search for evidence.

== See also ==
- List of newspapers in Canada
