= William Southam =

Canadian newspaper publisher

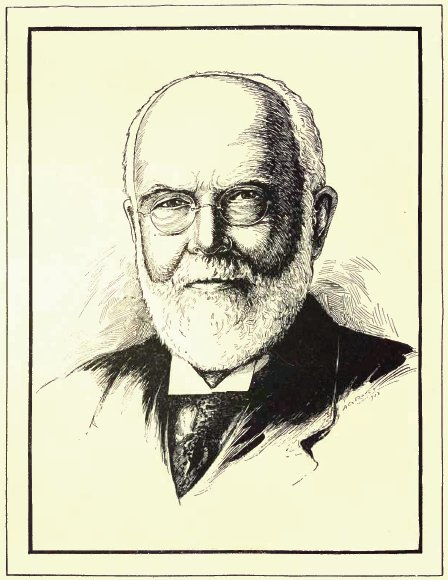
- William Southam in Canadian men of affairs in cartoon (1922)
- Born: August 23, 1843; Lachine, Canada East
- Died: February 27, 1932 (aged 88); Hamilton, Ontario, Canada
- Occupation: newspaper publisher

William Southam (August 23, 1843 – February 27, 1932) was a Canadian newspaper publisher.

== Life and career ==
Born in Lachine, Canada East, he began his newspaper career working for the London Free Press. The first newspaper he bought was the Hamilton Spectator. He would own the Ottawa Citizen, Calgary Herald, Edmonton Journal, Winnipeg Tribune, Windsor Star and Montreal Gazette. He would later send his sons to those cities to run the newspapers.

Robert Smiley, the founding publisher of The Hamilton Spectator, sold the newspaper to William Southam in 1877 as the first link in the Southam newspaper chain.

Southam had six sons: Wilson Mills Southam (1868-1947), Frederick Neil Southam (1869-1946), Richard Southam (1871-1937), Harry Stevenson Southam (1875-1954), William James Southam (1877-1957), and Gordon Hamilton Southam (1886–1916); and one daughter, Ethel May Southam Balfour (1881-1976).

His youngest son, Gordon, was a graduate of Upper Canada College and the University of Toronto would become briefly assistant manager at the Spectator before serving as a Major in the Canadian Field Artillery of the 8th Brigade and 40th Battery, in World War I. He was killed in the Battle of the Somme, France, October 15, 1916 and is buried in Albert, France.

Harry Stevenson (formerly with Montreal Gazette and later executive assistant in Ottawa) and Wilson Mills (former executive assistant at Hamilton Spectator and President of Southam Limited) were co-publishers of the Ottawa Citizen, Frederick Neil was Chairman of Southam Publishing until his death in 1946.

William James succeeded brother Wilson Mills as executive assistant in Hamilton after leaving his early work at Bank of Hamilton. Richard Southham ran the Mail Job Printing Company of Toronto.

== Tribute ==
The Southam neighbourhood on the Hamilton, Ontario Mountain was named after him. It is bounded by the Niagara Escarpment (north), Fennell Avenue East (south), West 5th Street (west) and Upper James Street (east). Landmarks in this neighbourhood include Southam Park, and Auchmar.

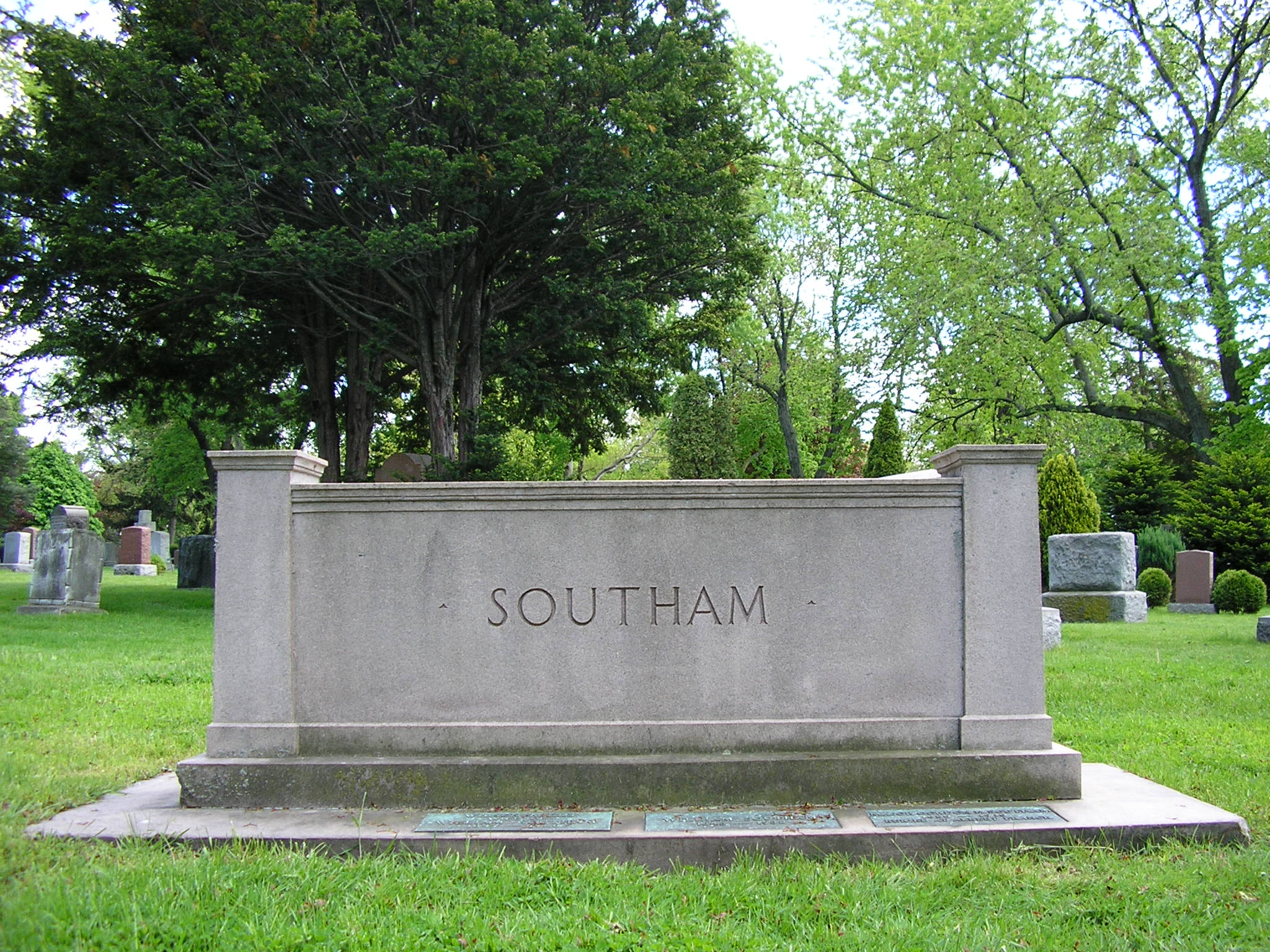
Southam family memorial, Hamilton Cemetery, Hamilton, Ontario.

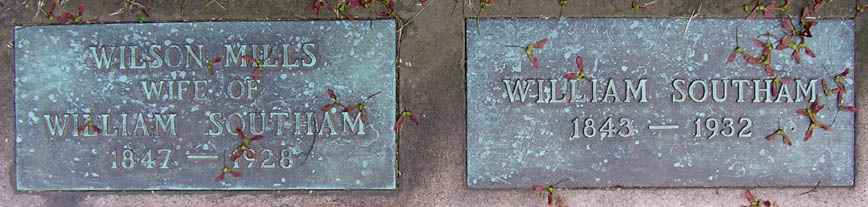
Plaques affixed to base of the Southam family memorial.

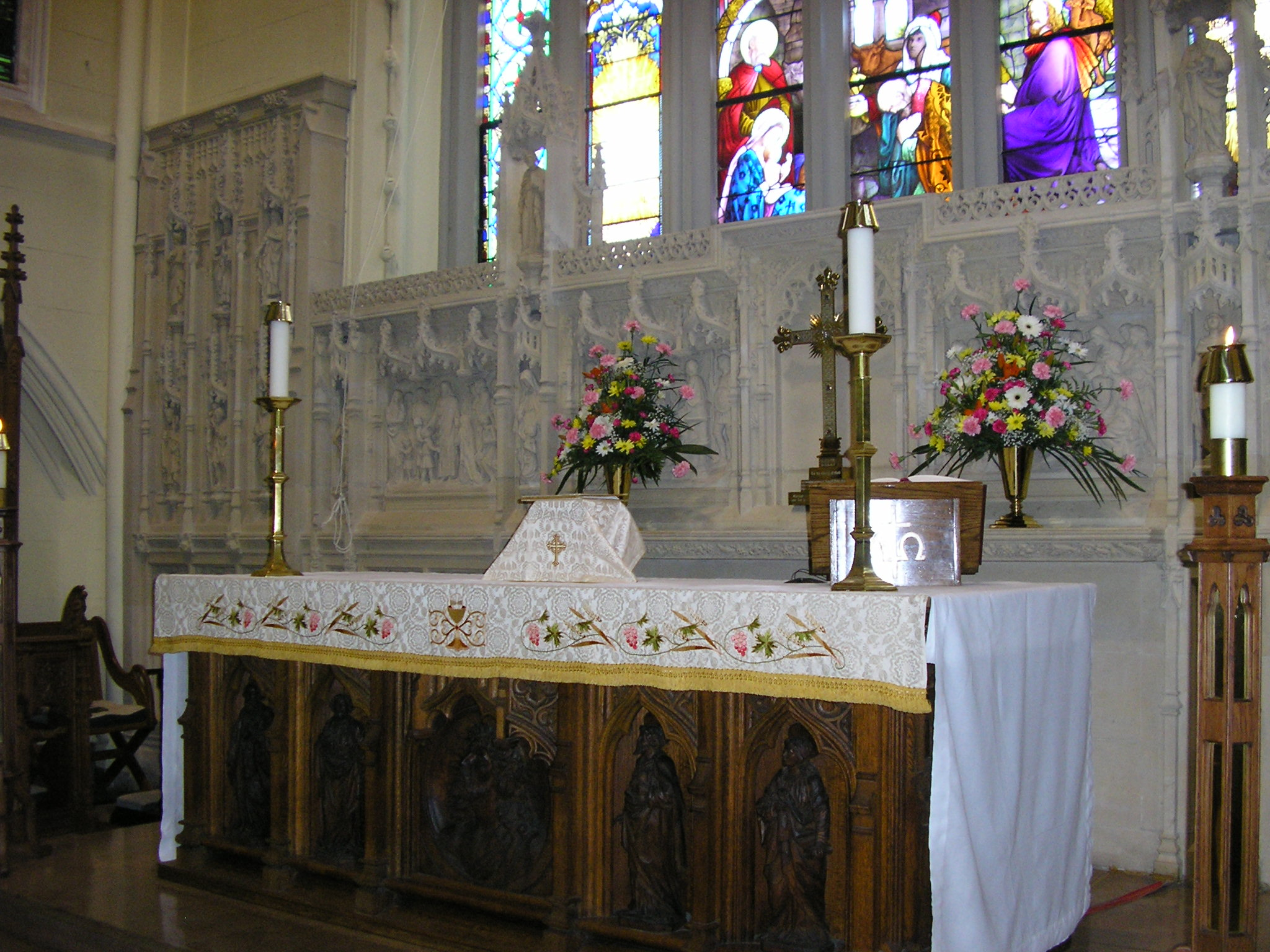
Caen stone reredos installed in 1932 in Christ's Church Cathedral, Hamilton, Ontario, as a memorial to the Southam family. Carved by J. Whippel & Company of England.
