= Niagara Falls Review =

Canadian daily newspaper

- Front page of the June 1, 2020 edition
- Type: Daily newspaper
- Owner: Metroland Media Group (Torstar)
- Founder(s): William Henry Anger; James Edwin Anger
- Founded: 1879; 147 years ago
- Language: English
- City: Niagara Falls, Ontario
- Country: Canada
- ISSN: 0839-1572
- Website: www.niagarafallsreview.ca

The Niagara Falls Review is a daily newspaper distributed in Niagara Falls and also serving the nearby towns of Fort Erie and Niagara-on-the-Lake area in Ontario, Canada. The paper is owned by Metroland Media Group, a subsidiary of Torstar. In late May 2020, Torstar accepted an offer for the sale of all of its assets to Nordstar Capital, a deal expected to close by year end.

== History ==
The Niagara Falls Review has been the local newspaper in Niagara Falls since 1879 and founded by William Henry Anger and James Edwin Anger.

Publishing daily since the 1930s, The Review currently competes with a weekly Metroland paper. Other papers available in its coverage area include the four Toronto dailies, the Hamilton Spectator and the St. Catharines Standard.

The Review does not have a physical office, but was once located on 4656 Erie Avenue (Louis Fisher Cigar Store) from 1879 to 1889, then Park Street, and at 4801 Valley Way from 1952 to 2014.

The Niagara Falls Review was one of several Postmedia newspapers purchased by Torstar in a transaction between the two companies which concluded on November 27, 2017. The paper will continue to be published by the Metroland Media Group subsidiary of Torstar.

The review was previously called The Evening Review and the Niagara Falls Review (up until 1970) when I started using its current name.

== See also ==
- List of newspapers in Canada
