= Joseph Fennell =

Canadian Anglican priest (1835–1919)

Joseph Fennell (March 16, 1835 – February, 1919) was an Anglican priest born in Cobourg, Upper Canada.

Fennell graduated from Victoria College, Cobourg, and from Trinity College, Toronto. He founded St. Stephen's Church on Concession Street in Hamilton. Holy Trinity parish on corner of Upper James and Fennell Avenue was named for him.

== Tribute ==
Fennell Avenue, a street on the Hamilton, Ontario Mountain was named after him.
