= Torstar Syndication Services =

Canadian media company

- Formerly: Toronto Star Syndicate
- Type: Print syndication
- Founded: 1930; 96 years ago
- Headquarters: Canada, Toronto, Ontario
- Area served: Canada
- Services: Distributes news, syndicated features, comic strips, photos, graphics to more than 500 daily and weekly newspapers
- Parent: Star Media Group
- Divisions: Torstar Syndicate; Torstar Syndication Services - Licensing; Torstar Syndication Services - Online Archives; Star Store
- Website: torstarsyndicate.com

Torstar Syndication Services is an operating division of Star Media Group led by the Toronto Star, Canada's largest daily newspaper. (Star Media Group is a division of Toronto Star Newspapers Limited, a Torstar Company.)

Torstar Syndication Services provides value-added services to publishers, companies, governments and consumers by collecting, packaging and distributing content. Activities also include managing content rights, and marketing and licensing content similar to King Features Syndicate. It supplies news, syndicated features, comic strips, photos, and graphics to more than 500 daily and weekly newspapers in Canada and worldwide. All content is collected, packaged and distributed by Torstar news editors.

In late May 2020, Torstar accepted an offer for the sale of all of its assets to Nordstar Capital, a deal expected to close by year end.

== History ==
Torstar Syndication Services is the largest syndicate in Canada. It started operation in 1930, and was formerly known as the Toronto Star Syndicate. The first major syndicated item was the Superman comic strip published in the Toronto Star and other dailies worldwide in the late 1930s and early 1940s.

TSS has been providing content, text and graphics since the 1930s. Most content, like articles, comics and photos, is acquired from both internal and external sources to various publications worldwide, such as The New York Times, The Washington Post, Hamilton Spectator and many others. TSS operates similarly to other well known syndicates like The Canadian Press and King Features Syndicate. Content is gained from internal sources, include most of the parent company, Torstar, newspapers and magazines, such as Toronto Star, the Hamilton Spectator, The Record, and Metroland Media Group. It also gains content from external sources such as other syndicates and publications. They also look after freelance creators, like Ellie, Advice Columnist. TSS packages, distributes and re-sells and/or licenses this to various people. These people include other publishers (i.e. New York Times), researchers and research services, large corporations, government agencies, film and television, clipping services, public and business libraries, various newspaper publications, and the general public.

== Divisions ==
Torstar Syndication Services has four areas:

Torstar Syndicate Sales division provides editorial content to newspapers and other media. This may include material produced by Torstar newspaper writers and columnists, comics and features from King Features Syndicate of New York, one of the oldest and largest syndicate in the world. Some content that is submitted by freelance Canadian creators is also used. Torstar Syndicate also provides editors to look over the syndicated material to make sure it is correct.

Torstar Syndication Services - Licensing provides various on-line research databases and media monitoring companies with licenses to provide access, to subscribers, to Torstar content. Some of the current vendors providing online access to databases with TorStar content include FPInfomart, ProQuest Micromedia, Factiva, LexisNexis, Thomson Dialog, and EBSCO

Torstar Syndication Services - Online Archives has two main archive products: digitized page image archives, and text archives. Pages of the Past is a fully searchable, web-based archive that includes every page, including photos, ads and classified, of every issue of the Toronto Star, back to 1894. Pages of the Past is also available to corporate, government, institutional and library markets, and is available to consumers.

Torstar newspaper text archives, which do not include graphics or images, are also available online through those web sites. Fully searchable text archives are available for the following newspapers: Toronto Star, Guelph Mercury, The Record, Hamilton Spectator and the Cambridge Reporter.

Star Store is an archive of almost one million images, covering local, national and international events for the past 100 years, Torstar Syndication Services sells Toronto Star photograph and full-page reprints for both personal and commercial use. Customers can browse or search more than 20,000 images and hundreds of front pages. Also available is a wide range of books, puzzles, and calendars.

== See also ==
- Toronto Star Newspapers Ltd.
- Torstar
