= Fennell Avenue (Hamilton, Ontario) =

Upper City (mountain) arterial road in Hamilton, Ontario, Canada

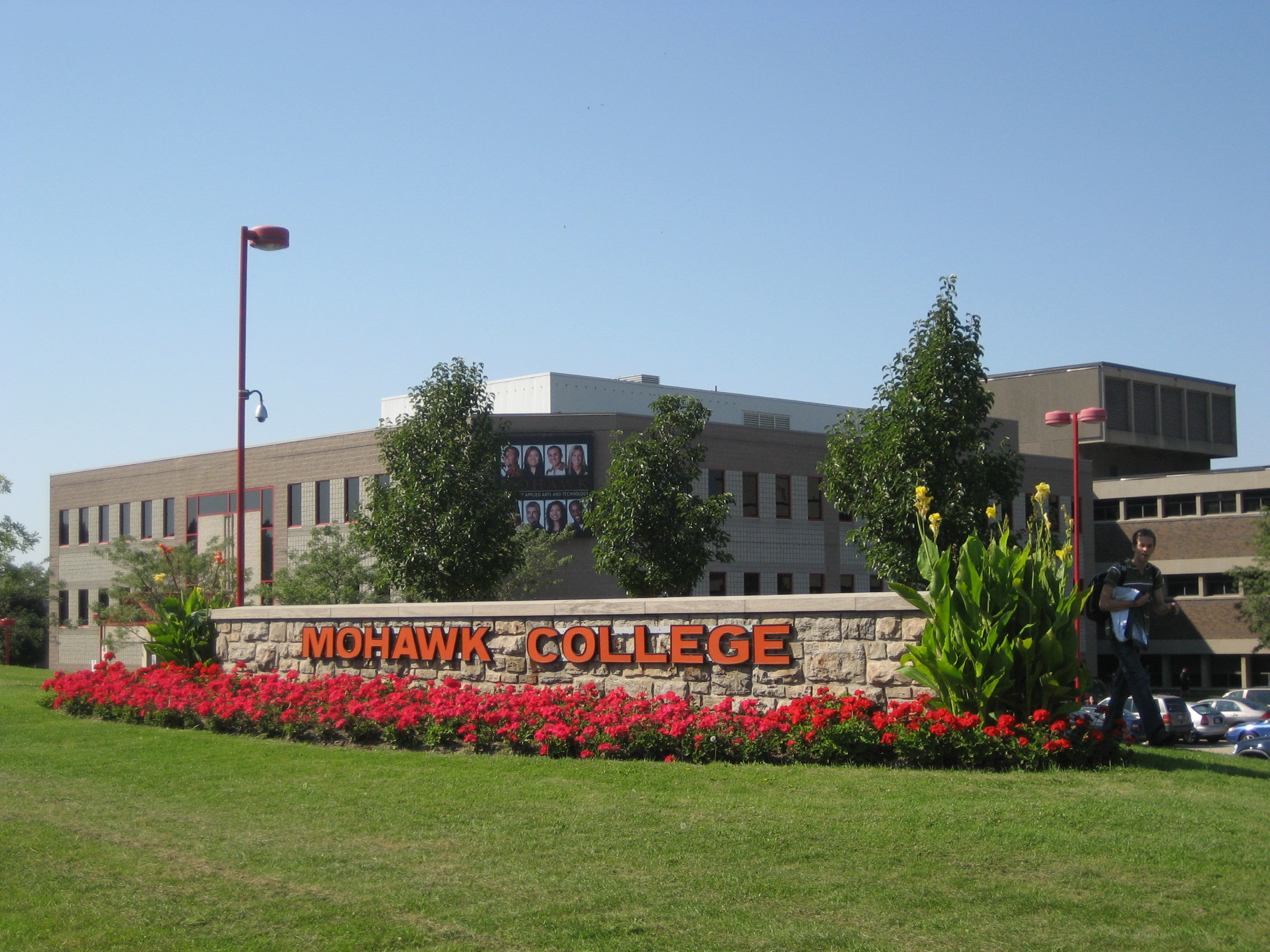
Mohawk College (Fennell campus)

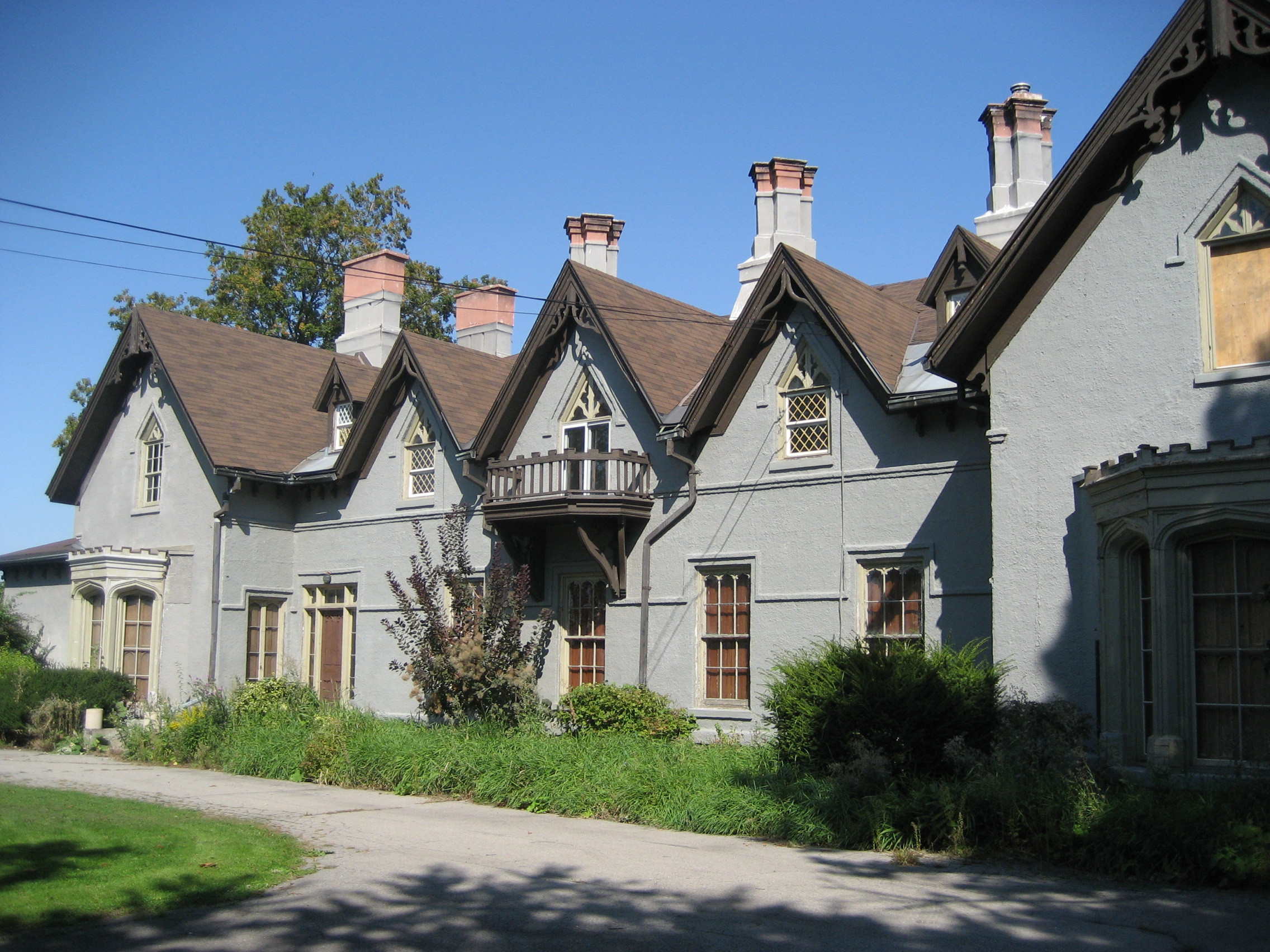
Auchmar, one-time estate of Isaac Buchanan

Fennell Avenue, is an Upper City (mountain) arterial road in Hamilton, Ontario, Canada. It starts off just east of Garth Street on the West mountain and is a two-way street throughout that extends eastward and ends at Mountain Brow Boulevard, a road that wraps around the edge of the Niagara Escarpment on Hamilton mountain.

== History ==
Fennell Avenue, is most likely named after Joseph Fennell, (1835–1919), Anglican priest. Early maps and directories listed the street as Fenel, Fennel and then finally, Fennell.

Auchmar, the estate of the Honourable Isaac Buchanan was built between 1852 and 1854 on a private estate on 86 acres (350,000 m^{2}) on the Hamilton mountain that he called Clairmont Park. Located at what is now the corner of Fennell and West 5th, the manor house, and its intact outbuildings, and stone wall-surrounded orchard sit on 10 acres (40,000 m^{2}) of land that include the original landscaped grounds. Auchmar is a unique, heritage asset owned by the citizens of Hamilton. Auchmar is recognized by the Ontario Heritage Trust as having significant historical value. Isaac Buchanan, was an international merchant, first president of the Hamilton Club, founder of Hamilton and Toronto boards of trade - forerunners to modern chambers of commerce - and founder of the regiment that would later become the Royal Hamilton Light Infantry.

In 1945, there was talk of constructing a tunnel on James Street South, in the Lower city to a surface point just south of Fennell Avenue. The cost was an issue but some city officials at the time felt it was necessary for the city to grow south, instead of their present unbalanced east–west development. The population of Hamilton Mountain at the time was 20,000 but some felt the numbers were actually larger because many tenants were not listed on voters' lists.

On June 1, 1949, the city of Hamilton issued 61 building permits on East Twenty-Seventh and East Twenty-Eighth Streets between Queensdale and Fennell Avenues. At the time it was the largest number of building permits issued at one time in the city by the city's building department and was described as "the biggest unsubsidized housing scheme in Canada.

== Today ==
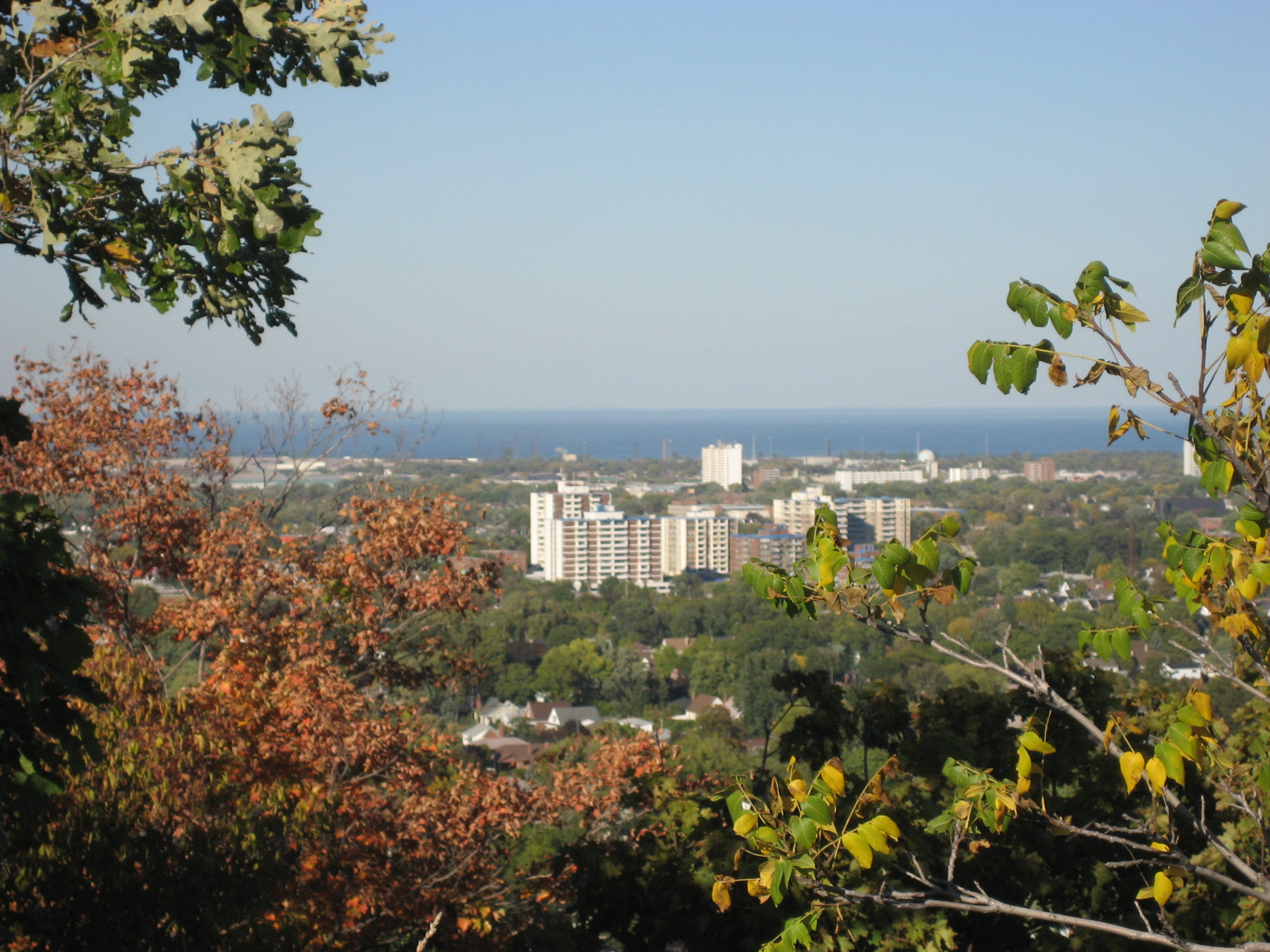
View of lower city from Upper King's Forest Park

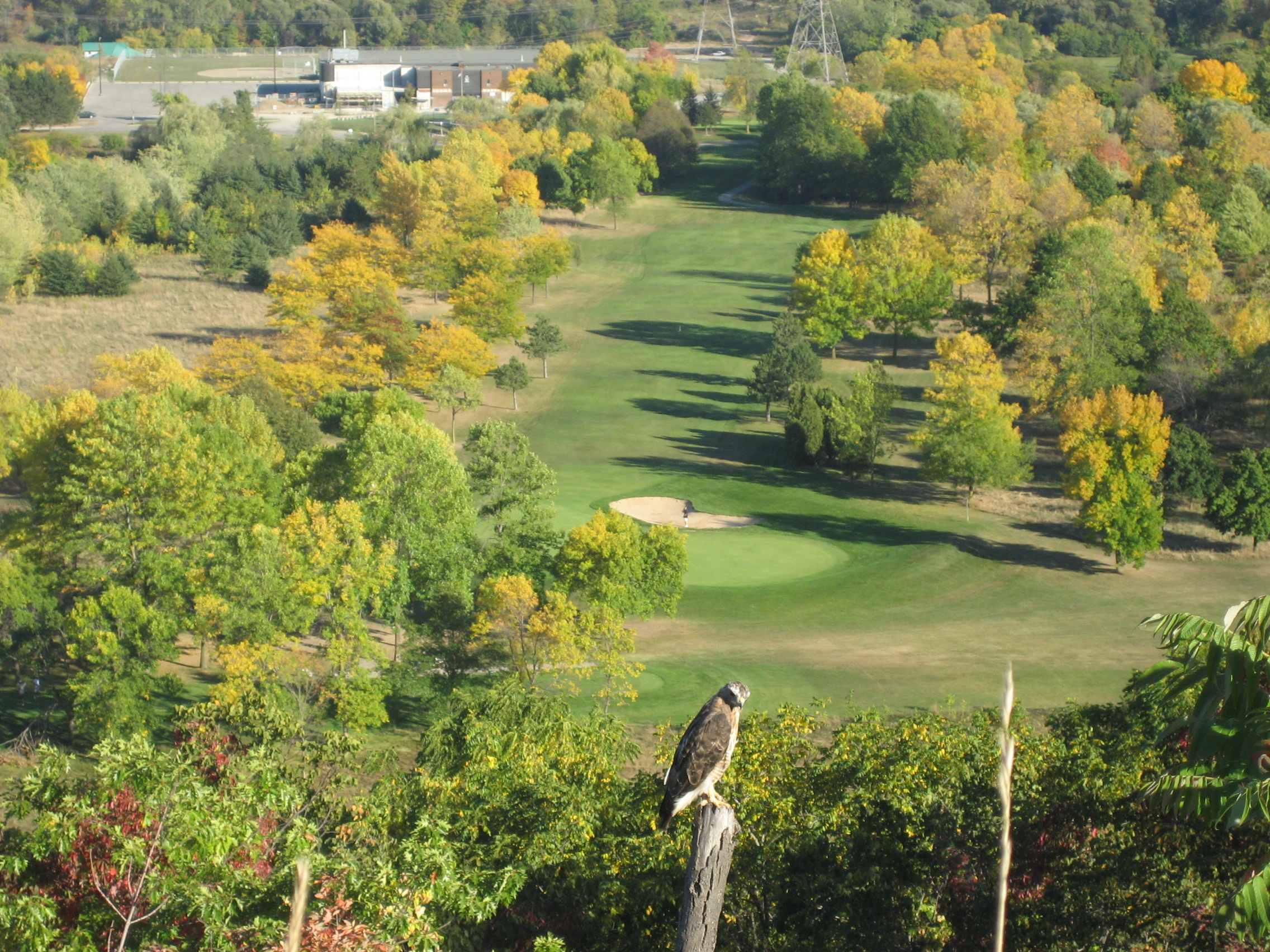
View of King's Forest Golf Course from Upper King's Forest Park

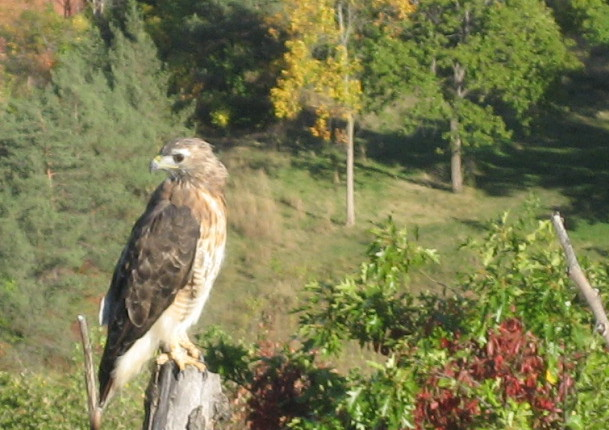
Falcon, Upper King's Forest Park

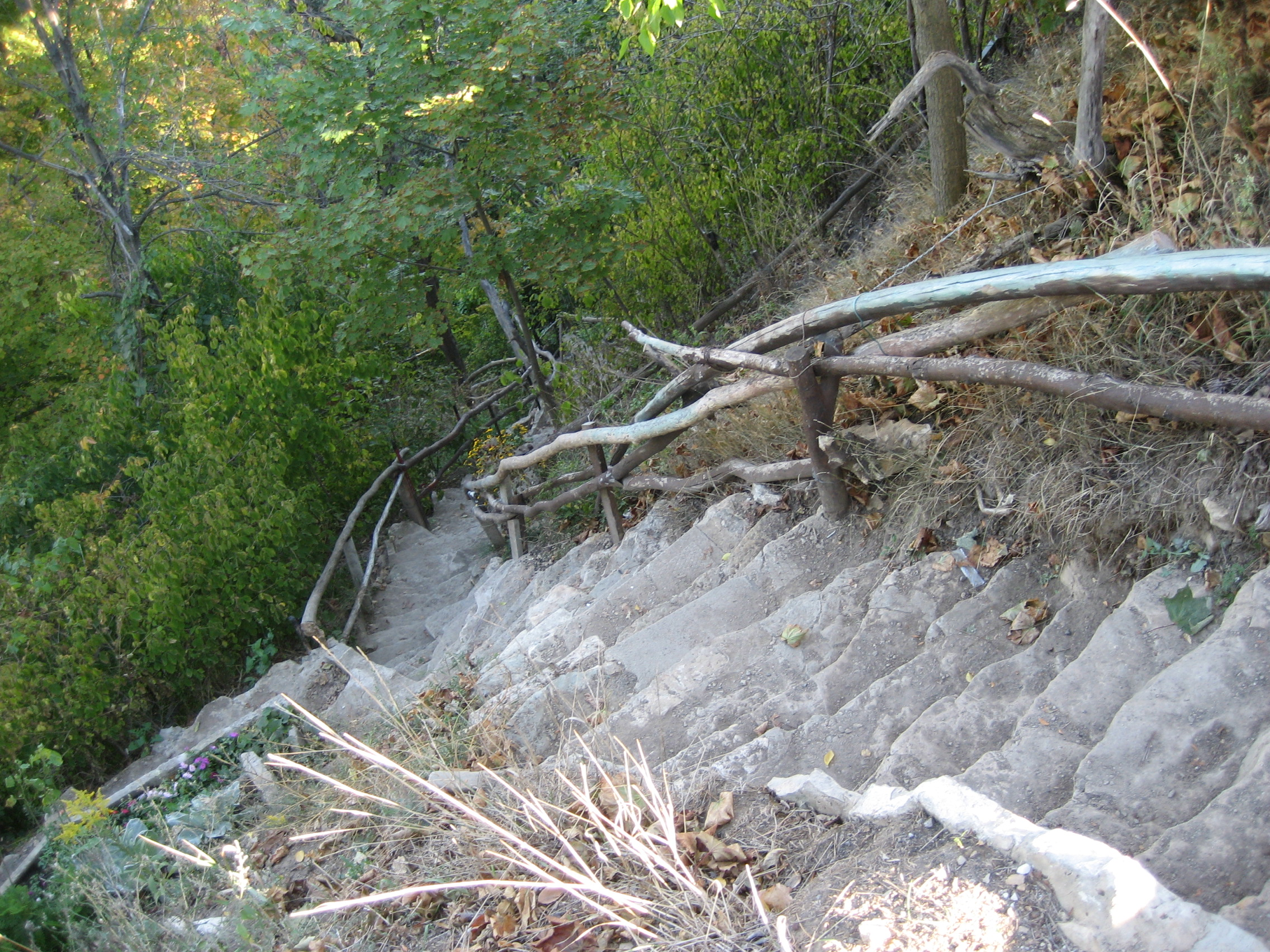
Uli's Stairs, connecting Mountain Brow to the Rail Trail

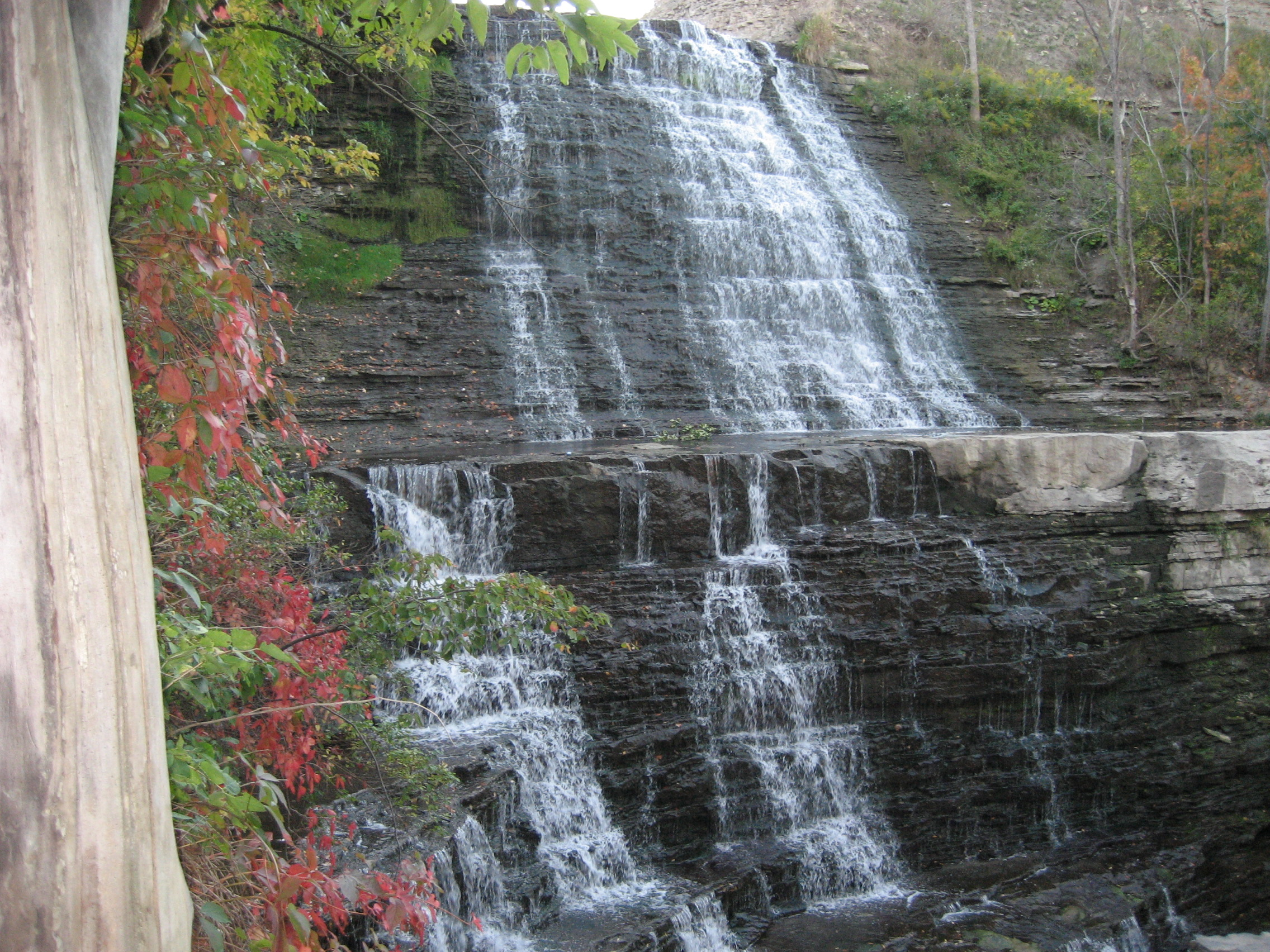
Albion Falls, near Fennell Avenue East at Upper King's Forest Park

Mohawk College is located at 135 Fennell Ave West (intersection of West 5th Street). It was founded in 1966 and has led to numerous direct and indirect jobs in education and research. Mohawk first started granting diplomas in 1966, and has since grown into one of the largest provincially funded colleges in the province of Ontario. Each year averages approximately 10,000 full-time students, and 40,000 part-time students. The most popular programs continue to be in Engineering Technology and Business. Mohawk College also has a well known nursing program, a joint program with McMaster University.

Hillfield Strathallan College is also located on Fennell Ave West (west of Mohawk College) the only private K-12 school in the area. Founded in 1901 as Highfield School for Boys, this school was the first private residential and day school for boys in the city of Hamilton. It was a prep school for boys planning to enter the Royal Military College of Canada. Many graduates played key roles in the Canadian military. A series of name changes, reconstructions, new construction, and amalgamations with other institutions have since occurred, resulting in a single modern co-educational facility. Alumni from all founding organizations attended the centennial anniversary in 2001. Famous alumni include Henry Duncan Graham Crerar, Canada's leading Field Commander during the Second World War, Steve Paikin, host of TVOntario's Studio Two, Kathleen Robertson, actress, played the role of Clare Arnold on Beverly Hills, 90210 and Gema Zamprogna, actress, played the role of Felicity Clark on Road to Avonlea.

Uli's Stairs are stone steps that connect the mountain brow to the Rail Trail. They were made by a local man named Ulrich, otherwise known as Uli. The city sees his steps as a risk to public safety. These steps are also the only steps connecting the Lower City of Hamilton to the Upper City in East Hamilton. The city has a set of steps made of steel nearby at the end of Kimberly Drive near Kenilworth Avenue but they only go halfway up to the Escarpment Rail Trail and the Bruce Trail. Uli's steps makes up the final link between the Rail Trail and the mountain brow on top. The city of Hamilton plans on building a set of metal stairs near Margate Avenue which will cost the city $425,000 to install, just a few metres from Uli's steps but it has been met with opposition from residents at the top of the planned stairs.

The Mountain Plaza Mall at Fennell Avenue and Upper James Street has been rebuilt in a $50-million project, with Walmart Canada as an anchor tenant. Announcement made on October 4, 2007, by Flavio Volpe, spokesperson for Smart Centres Ltd., Vaughan, Ontario-based company that bought the Mall in November 2006.

== Major intersections ==
Note: Listing of streets from West to East.

- Garth Street
- West 5th Street
- Upper James Street
- Upper Wellington Street
- Upper Wentworth Street
- Upper Sherman Avenue
- Upper Gage Avenue
- Upper Ottawa Street
- Upper Kenilworth Avenue
- Mountain Brow Boulevard

== Images ==
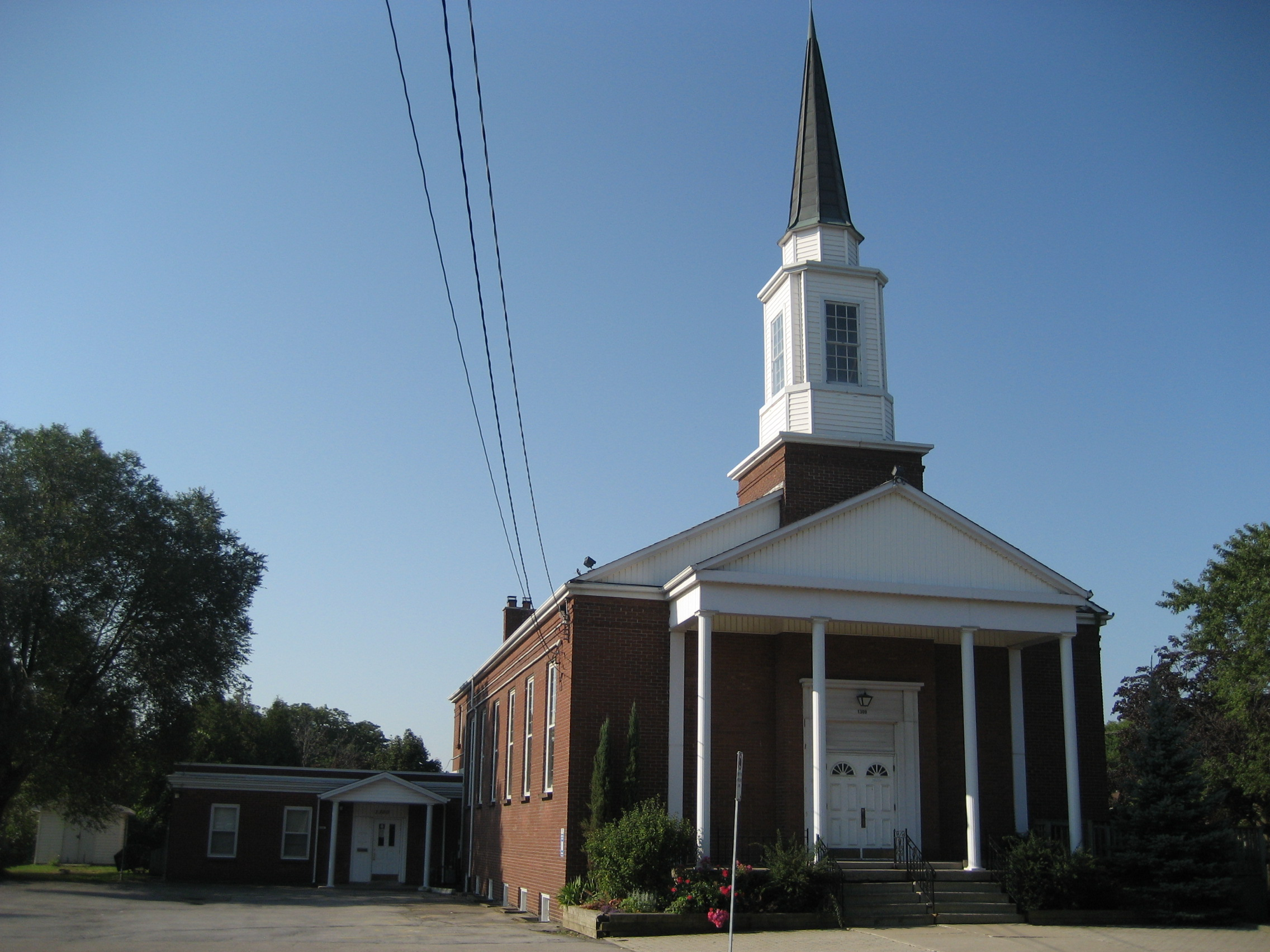
Elliott Heights Baptist Church

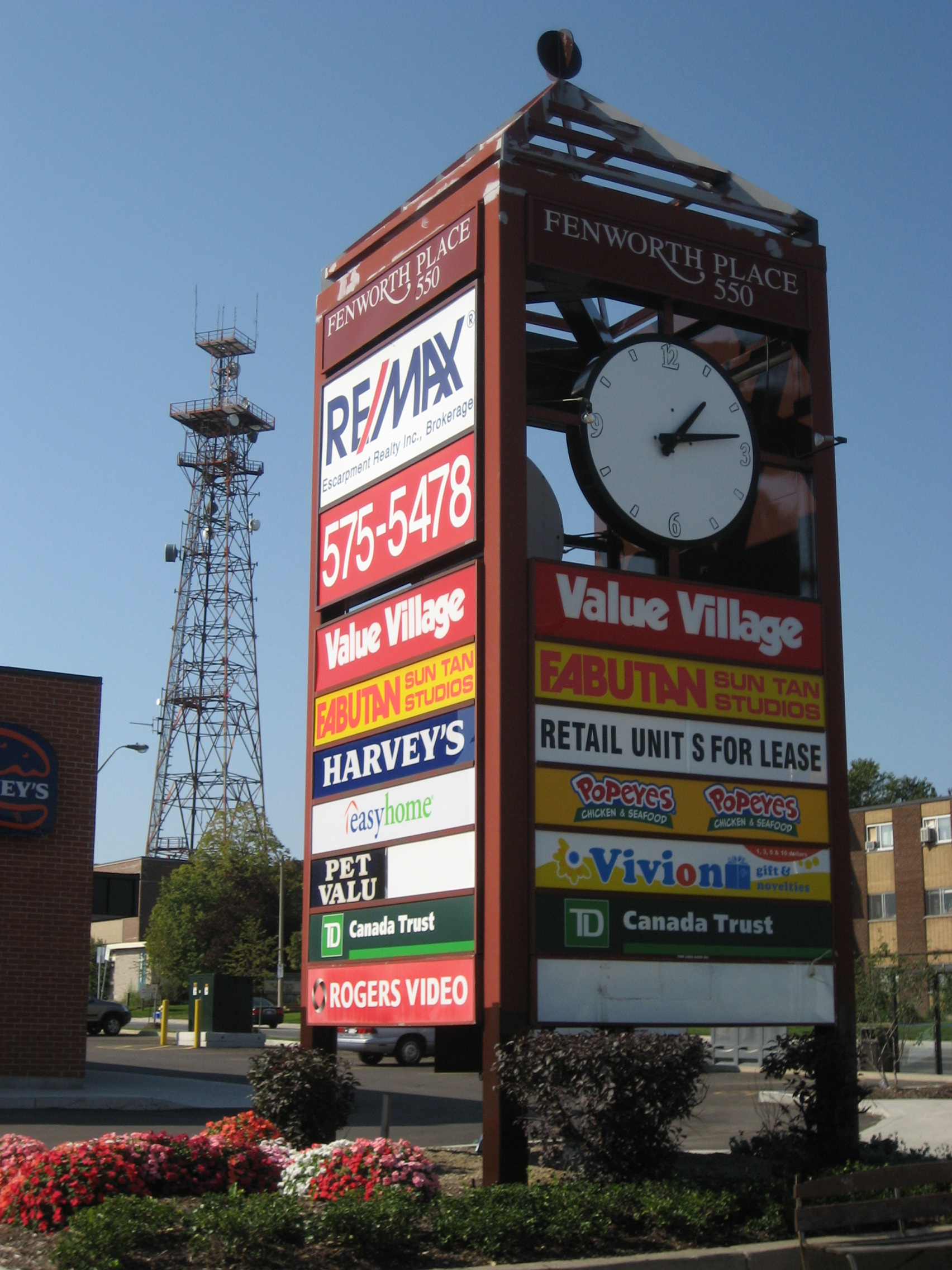
Fenworth Place

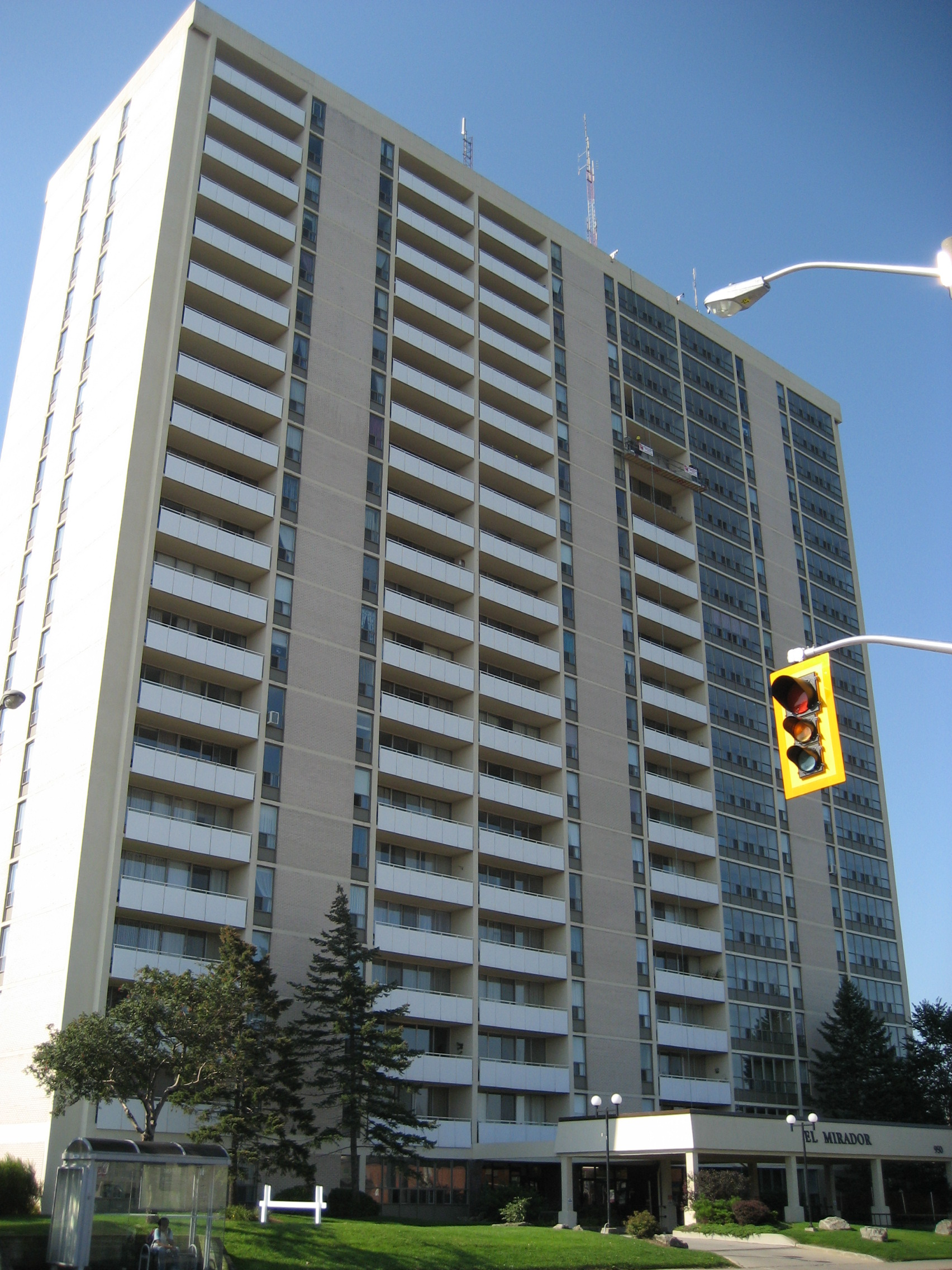
El Mirador Apartments

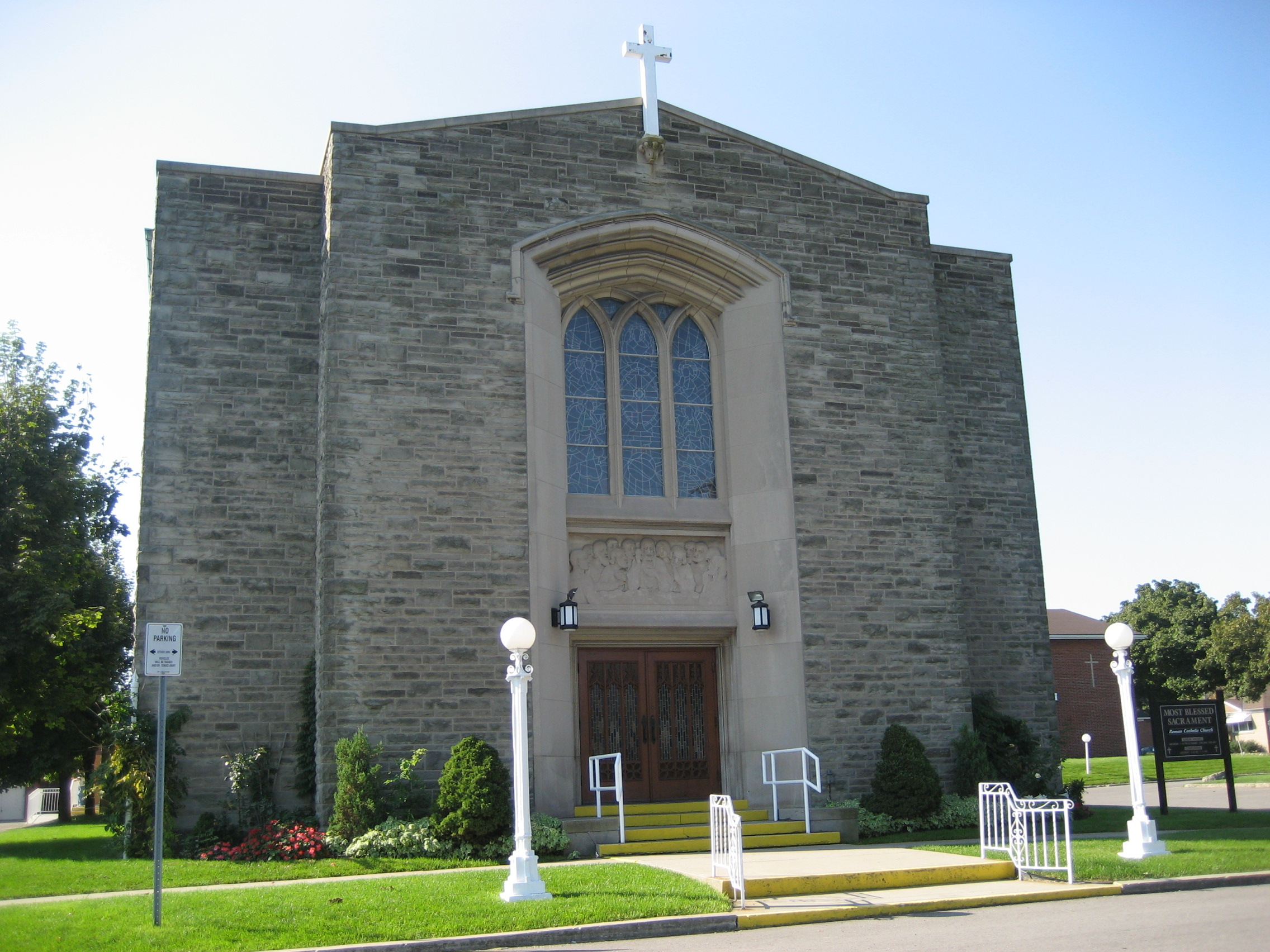
Most Blessed Sacrament Church

== See also ==
- Niagara Escarpment Commission
