= Daily News Brands =

Division of Canadian publishing company Torstar

- Formerly: Star Media Group
- Type: Division
- Industry: Mass media
- Headquarters: Toronto, Ontario, Canada
- Products: Media, newspapers, magazines
- Owner: Torstar Corporation
- Website: Official website

Daily News Brands, formerly Star Media Group, is a Canadian media organization and a division of Torstar Corporation. Its flagship publication is the Toronto Star newspaper, which is owned by Toronto Star Newspapers Limited, a subsidiary of Torstar.

== Portfolio ==
Former logo as Star Media Group

- Toronto Star Newspapers Limited
  - The Kit
  - Toronto Star
  - Torstar Syndication Services

=== Former holdings ===
- Eye Weekly
- The Grid
- GTA Today
- Starweek
- Torstar Media Group Television
  - ShopTV Canada
- Workopolis (50%), employment website. Formerly a joint venture with Square Victoria Digital Properties until Indeed purchased Workopolis in June 2018.

== See also ==
- Metroland Media Group
- Torstar
