= Torstar =

Canadian mass media company

Torstar Corporation
- Type: Private
- Industry: Mass media
- Founded: 1958; 68 years ago
- Headquarters: 8 Spadina Ave; Toronto, Ontario
- Key people: Neil Oliver (CEO)
- Owner: Jordan Bitove
- Number of employees: <1000 (2024)
- Divisions: Toronto Star; Metroland Media Group
- Website: torstar.ca

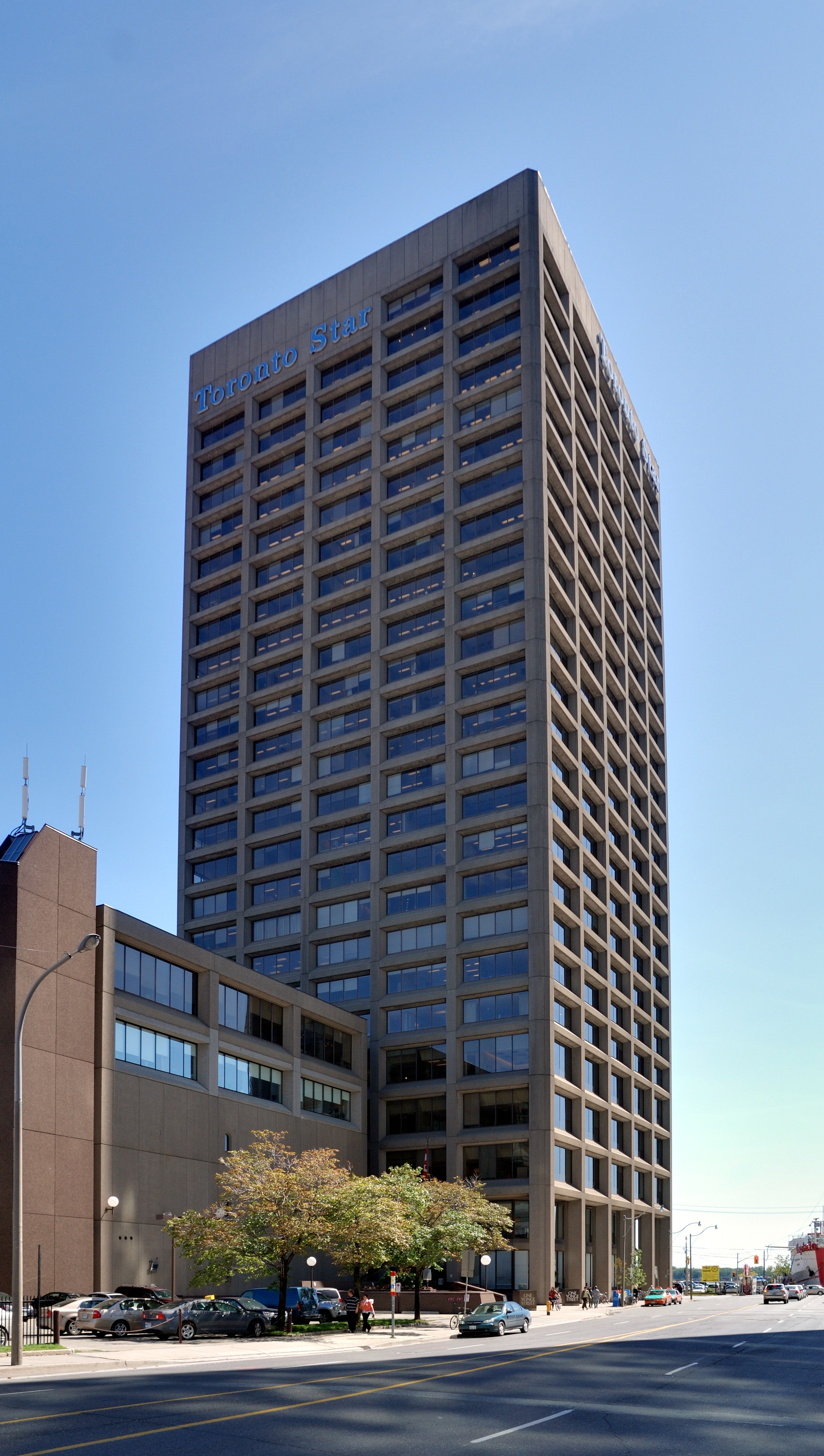
One Yonge Street, the former Torstar headquarters

Torstar Corporation is a Canadian mass media company which primarily publishes news. It is known for publishing the Toronto Star, its flagship and namesake. It also publishes daily newspapers in Hamilton, Peterborough, Niagara Region, and Waterloo Region, in addition to their ownership of the Metroland Media Group and a 33.33% ownership of the Canadian Press.

The corporation was established in 1958 to take over operations of the Star from the Atkinson Foundation after a provincial law banned charitable organizations from owning for-profit entities. From 1958 to 2020, the class A shares of Torstar were held by the families of the original Atkinson Foundation trustees. The private investment firm NordStar Capital LP, formed by Paul Rivett and Jordan Bitove, acquired the company in 2020. In 2022, Rivett left NordStar due to disputes with Bitove.

== History ==
Torstar was founded after the Ontario government passed a law barring the provisions of late-Toronto Star owner Joseph Atkinson's will from being enacted. Atkinson had bequeathed the newspaper to a charitable organization he had founded. The Progressive Conservative provincial government of George Drew passed a law banning charitable organizations from operating profitable entities such as newspapers. Rather than sell the newspaper, the trustees of the Atkinson Foundation bought out the Star privately and founded Torstar as a private corporation.

On November 26, 2010, it was announced that the Canadian Press news agency would be taken over by a for-profit corporation, with Torstar serving as one of its investors. On November 27, 2017, Postmedia and Torstar announced a transaction in which Postmedia would sell seven dailies, eight community papers, and the Toronto and Vancouver 24 Hours to Torstar, in exchange for 22 community papers and the Ottawa and Winnipeg versions of Metro. Except for the Exeter Times-Advocate, St. Catharines Standard, Niagara Falls Review, Peterborough Examiner, and Welland Tribune, all acquired papers were to be closed. Torstar stated that it wanted to focus on building synergies within its existing markets served. The swaps effectively remove competition between the two companies in the affected markets; the Competition Bureau stated that it would review the proposed deal. and in March 2018, formally accused the companies of using no-compete clauses to reduce competition in the newspaper industry, in violation of the Competition Act. On December 20, 2018, Torstar applied to the Ontario Superior Court for an order to keep documents seized from its offices by the Competition Bureau sealed from the public.

=== Sale to NordStar ===
==== Initial NordStar proposal ====
On May 26, 2020, Toronto Star publisher John Honderich announced the sale of Torstar to Nordstar Capital LP, which was formed by former Fairfax Financial President Paul Rivett and Jordan Bitove, for $52 million. The price for the class A voting shares and class B non-voting shares was set at 63 cents in the deal. At the time of the most recent quarter, Torstar had $69 million in cash on its balance sheet – more than the $52-million acquisition price from Nordstar. However, Torstar's share price had suffered from the company's inability to generate enough revenue or cost savings to pay quarterly dividends, which were suspended late in 2019. The suspension pushed the publicly traded B shares to what was then the lowest level since at least the late 1990s — 53 cents. Weeks prior to the announcement of the deal, Torstar had reported a $23.5-million loss for the first quarter of 2020.

The new owners planned to make Torstar a private company with former Premier of Ontario David Peterson as chair of the board.

==== NordStar revised proposal and final sale ====
On July 11, the NordStar bid was increased to $60 million, or 74 cents per share, with the Voting Trust and Fairfax revising their soft lock-up agreements, to hard lock-ups. This effectively put an end to the bidding process because the terms of the revised bid meant that "the Voting Trust and Fairfax can't change their votes to support any other bid".

In the shareholder vote held on July 21, 99.7% of the class A shareholders favoured the NordStar offer as did 98.1% class B shareholders. However, only 81.9% of minority shareholders (not including the Voting Trust or Fairfax Financial) voted to accept the NordStar offer. On July 23, Blake, Cassels & Graydon LLP, an international corporate law firm representing Torstar, brought forth a motion on behalf of Torstar before Ontario Superior Court Justice Gilmore to approve Torstar's plan of arrangement with respect to the acquisition of Torstar. Grant Vingoe, chair of the Ontario Securities Commission, had previously said in a letter to Andrea Horvath that the court was the appropriate venue to challenge the proposal. He further said that the test to be applied by the court was whether the process leading to the arrangement was fair and reasonable. On July 25, the Globe and Mail published an interview with Butch Folland, a significant member of Torstar's voting trust and the great-grandson of the founder of Torstar, Joseph E. Atkinson, Torstar's original publisher and the author of the Atkinson Principles. Folland is also the grandson of Harry Hindmarsh, who was President of the Star following Atkinson's death in 1948. His personal ties to the Toronto Star date back to age 13 when he took a job as an office boy. In that article. Folland is quoted as saying, "I was really disappointed in the outcome. I felt that the process wasn't really fair in the way it affected me."

Late in the evening on July 27, an Ontario court approved the $60-million takeover of Torstar Corp. by private equity firm NordStar Capital LP over the objections of a rival bidding group, which immediately said it planned to appeal the judge's decision. Ontario Superior Court Justice Cory Gilmore ruled NordStar, could close their purchase of Torstar.

Rivett-Bitove split

In September 2022, Rivett filed a court application split to the assets of Nordstar due to his relationship with Bitove deteriorating. On February 8, 2023, a deal finalized by arbitrator Douglas Cunningham gave Bitove the Toronto Star and the Metroland Media Group while Rivett received iPolitics and Queen's Park Briefing.

== Operations ==
=== Daily News Brands ===
The Daily News Brands division primarily comprises the Toronto Star and its associated properties, including Torstar Syndication Services. The division also owns The Hamilton Spectator, the Waterloo Region Record, the St. Catharines Standard, the Niagara Falls Review, the Welland Tribune, and the Peterborough Examiner. The StarMetro chain of free daily newspapers serving Calgary, Edmonton, Halifax, Toronto, and Vancouver was also part of this division until publication of those titles ceased in 2019.

=== Community Brands ===
The Community Brands division, Metroland Media Group, owns more than 70 weekly community papers as of late May 2020, the free magazine Canadian Immigrant, and other community-oriented properties.

=== VerticalScope ===
On July 29, 2015, Torstar announced its acquisition of a 56% majority stake in VerticalScope, a Toronto-based owner of online communities, for $200 million. VerticalScope operates numerous websites and internet discussion message boards dedicated to various topics. Torstar CEO David Holland explained that the purchase was designed to bolster the company's presence in digital media.

As of June 2021, VerticalScope was taken public through an IPO and is now publicly traded under the ticker FORA on the Toronto Stock Exchange. As part of that IPO, Torstar ceased owning VerticalScope.

=== Star Touch and ePaper apps ===
Launched in 2015, Toronto Star Touch was the company's app designed specifically for tablet computers. It was discontinued in late July 2017 after an investment totaling $20 million because of an inadequate volume of readers and advertisers and was replaced by universal apps available for both Android and iOS smartphones and tablets.

=== Management ===
The following is a list of past presidents and CEOs of Torstar:

- Beland Honderich 1966–1988 (as president), 1976–1988 (as CEO and chair)
- David R. Jolley 1988–1994
- David A. Galloway 1988–2002
- J. Robert S. Prichard 2002–2009
- David P. Holland 2009–2017
- Neil Oliver 2022–2024
- Angus Frame 2024-present (as President)

== Other investments ==
Torstar owns a 20 per cent stake in the Victoria, British Columbia-based newspaper publisher Black Press. The company is also part owner of The Canadian Press.

=== Past investments ===
Torstar launched a weekly celebrity-based magazine called Scoop in 2005, which folded one year later.

Between late 2005 and early 2011, Torstar also held a 20 per cent stake in CTVglobemedia, a Canadian media company which broke up when BCE Inc., the parent company of Bell Canada, purchased the company's media assets. This caused some controversy because CTVgm owned The Globe and Mail, a competing newspaper to Torstar's own Toronto Star. There were no editorial hurdles between the two newspapers however. Torstar sold its shares in 2011.

On May 2, 2014, Torstar announced the sale of Harlequin Enterprises, a publisher of romance novels, to HarperCollins for $415 million.

== See also ==
- Postmedia Network
- Quebecor Media
- The Woodbridge Company
- Grant v. Torstar Corp.
