= St. Catharines Standard =

Canadian daily newspaper in Ontario

- Front page of the June 8, 2020 edition
- Type: Daily newspaper
- Format: Broadsheet
- Owner: Metroland Media Group (Torstar)
- Founder: W. B. Burgoyne
- Editor: Angus Scott
- Founded: 1891; 135 years ago
- Language: English
- Headquarters: 1 St. Paul Street; Unit 10; St. Catharines, Ontario; L2R 7L4
- Circulation: 17,801 weekdays 19,733 Saturdays (as of 2011)
- ISSN: 0837-3426
- Website: www.stcatharinesstandard.ca

The St. Catharines Standard is a daily newspaper serving the city of St. Catharines, Ontario, Canada. As of May 2020, the publication was owned by Torstar but on May 26, 2020, the company agreed to be acquired by NordStar Capital, a private investment firm. The deal was expected to close prior to year end.

== History ==
The St. Catharines Standard was started in 1891, and purchased by W. B. Burgoyne for $1 in 1892. The Standard, located in St. Catharines, Ontario, is the largest daily newspaper in Niagara. It has published continuously since 1891.

Its focus is local news, and it includes national and international news, sports, entertainment and lifestyle reporting. The newspaper is a consistent winner of Ontario Newspaper Awards, along with other newspaper industry awards.

It was later purchased by Southam Newspapers and then Canwest Global Communications. Osprey Media took over as publisher for a number of years until June 1, 2007, when it was announced Quebecor would acquire the company and its newspapers for $355.5 million. In 2015, Quebecor's English language newspapers were sold to Postmedia.

The Standard was one of several Postmedia newspapers purchased by Torstar in a transaction between the two companies which concluded on November 27, 2017. The paper continued to be published by the Metroland Media Group subsidiary of Torstar.

== See also ==
- List of newspapers in Canada
