= The Hamilton Spectator =

Canadian daily newspaper

- Front page of the June 1, 2020 edition
- Type: Daily newspaper
- Format: Broadsheet
- Owner: Metroland Media Group (Torstar Corporation)
- Publisher: Brandon Grosvenor
- Editor: Cheryl Stepan
- Founded: 1846
- Headquarters: 8 Spadina Ave, Suite 10A; Toronto, Ontario; M5V 0S8
- Circulation: 99,391 weekdays 103,109 Saturdays (as of 2010)
- ISSN: 1189-9417
- Website: www.thespec.com

The Hamilton Spectator, founded in 1846, is a newspaper published weekdays and Saturdays in Hamilton, Ontario, Canada. One of the largest Canadian newspapers by circulation, The Hamilton Spectator is owned by Torstar.

== History ==
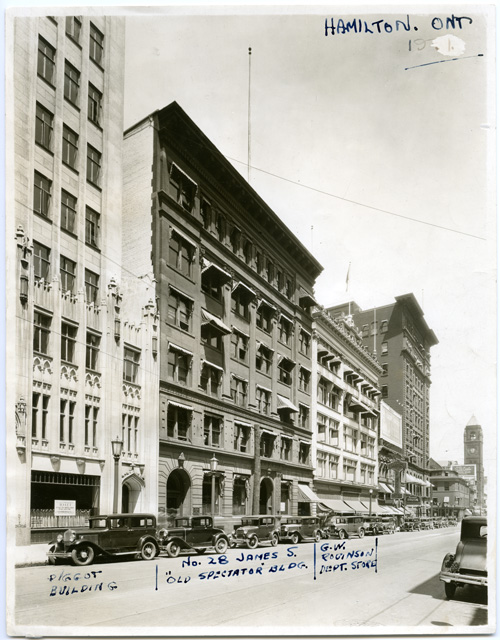
The Hamilton Spectator building c. 1931

The Hamilton Spectator was founded by Robert Smiley, and a Tory business partner that helped finance the project. It was first published as a bi-weekly newspaper, on July 15, 1846, as The Hamilton Spectator and Journal of Commerce. In 1852, it became a daily newspaper. The paper was sold in 1877 to William Southam, who founded the Southam newspaper chain and made the Spectator the first of the chain. The Southam chain was sold in 1998 to Conrad Black, who in turn sold off The Hamilton Spectator to Toronto-based Sun Media. In 1999, the Spectator was sold for a third time to Torstar Corporation. On May 26, 2020, its parent company, Torstar, agreed to be acquired by NordStar Capital, a private investment firm. The deal was approved by a judge in Ontario Superior Court on 27 July 2020.

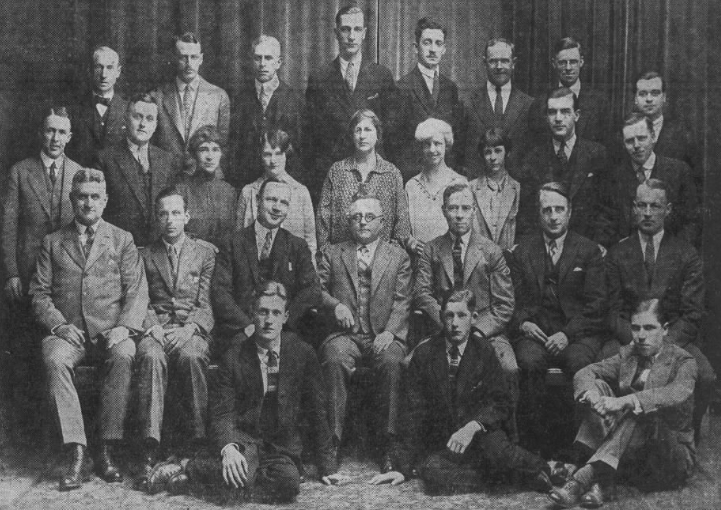
The Hamilton Spectator journalists c. 1926

== Publication ==
The Hamilton Spectator is published Monday through Saturday by Metroland Media Group, a division of Torstar.It serves Hamilton, Burlington and the Niagara region. It also serves Brant County and Haldimand County towns such as Caledonia, Hagersville and Dunnville. The Spectator also serves the region of Halton, which includes towns as far east as Oakville.

== Notable staff ==
- David Griffin, journalist, Olympic athlete, and Royal Canadian Air Force public relations officer
- Ivan Miller, worked 45 years for The Hamilton Spectator, became the sports editor in 1944, then the sports director in 1958
- Melville Marks Robinson, sports editor for The Hamilton Spectator and organizer of the 1930 British Empire Games

== See also ==
- List of newspapers in Canada
- List of newspapers in Canada by circulation
- Hamilton Spectator Trophy
