= Upper James Street =

Upper City (mountain) arterial road in Hamilton, Ontario, Canada

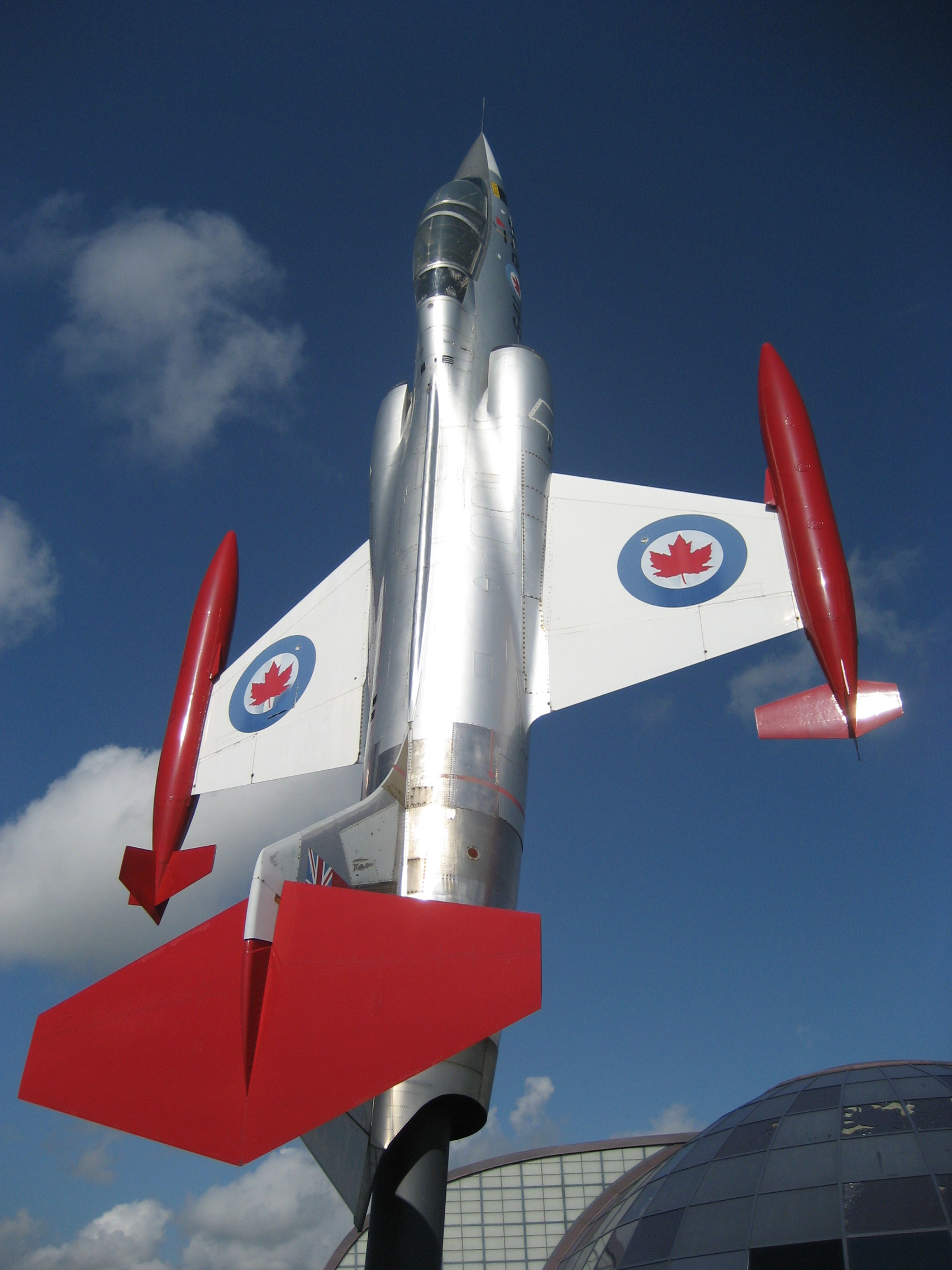
Canadian Warplane Heritage Museum, John C. Munro Hamilton, International Airport

Upper James Street is an Upper City (mountain) arterial road in Hamilton, Ontario, Canada. It starts at the Claremont Access, a mountain-access road in the north, and extends southward towards the John C. Munro Hamilton International Airport where it then changes its name to the Hamilton Port Dover Plank Road, (Highway 6). It is a two-way street throughout. As with most of the "Upper" streets, their addresses start at roughly the point where their lower counterpart finishes just below the Escarpment and were originally labelled without the "Upper" prefix.

(Note: Highway 6 now uses a new alignment from Highway 403 to south of the Hamilton Airport, connecting with the southerly leg to Caledonia, the Grand River and Port Dover.)

== History ==
It was named Upper James Street because it was in alignment with James Street in the Lower City Hamilton and was named after one of Nathaniel Hughson's sons. Hughson was one of the City founders along with George Hamilton and James Durand. Originally it was called the Caledonia Road because it was the road that led to Caledonia, Ontario. It has also been known as Plank Road.

As early as 1842 an inn was situated at the top of the escarpment near Claremont access, where present day Southam Park is situated. By 1850 a four-storey stone structure was erected at the site and it was called the Mountain View Hotel. It met the needs of those travelling the Caledonia Road, (Upper James Street). Farmers travelling in from townships south of Hamilton rested their horses here on the way to and from the Hamilton Farmer's Market. It offered patrons an unobstructed view of the city below and Lake Ontario beyond. The hotel served as a lookout point for Thirteenth Battalion during the Fenian threat in 1866. The building was destroyed by fire in 1878 and replaced by a new five-storey structure that included an elaborate observation tower on its eastern end in 1881. In 1890 a pavilion suitable for roller skating and dancing was added attracting various family and organized events. Access was improved with an Incline railway immediately to the north. When the establishments liquor license was revoked in 1916 the property was sold. It then served as the home for the Hamilton Hunt Club. The building was razed in 1937 and the grounds were donated to the City of Hamilton for use as a park in 1943.

=== Westend incline railway ===
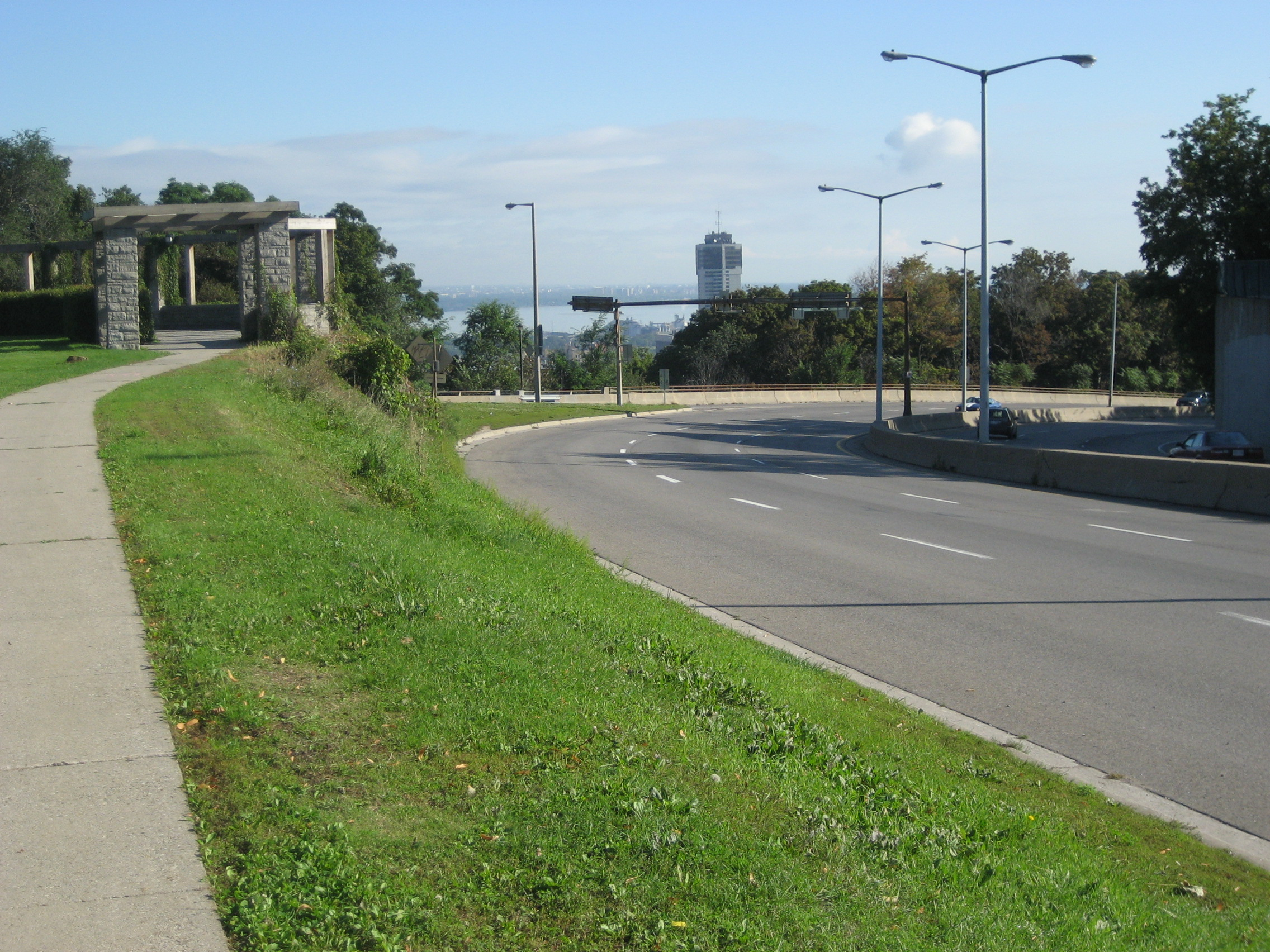
Claremont Access, original site of West-end Incline Railway

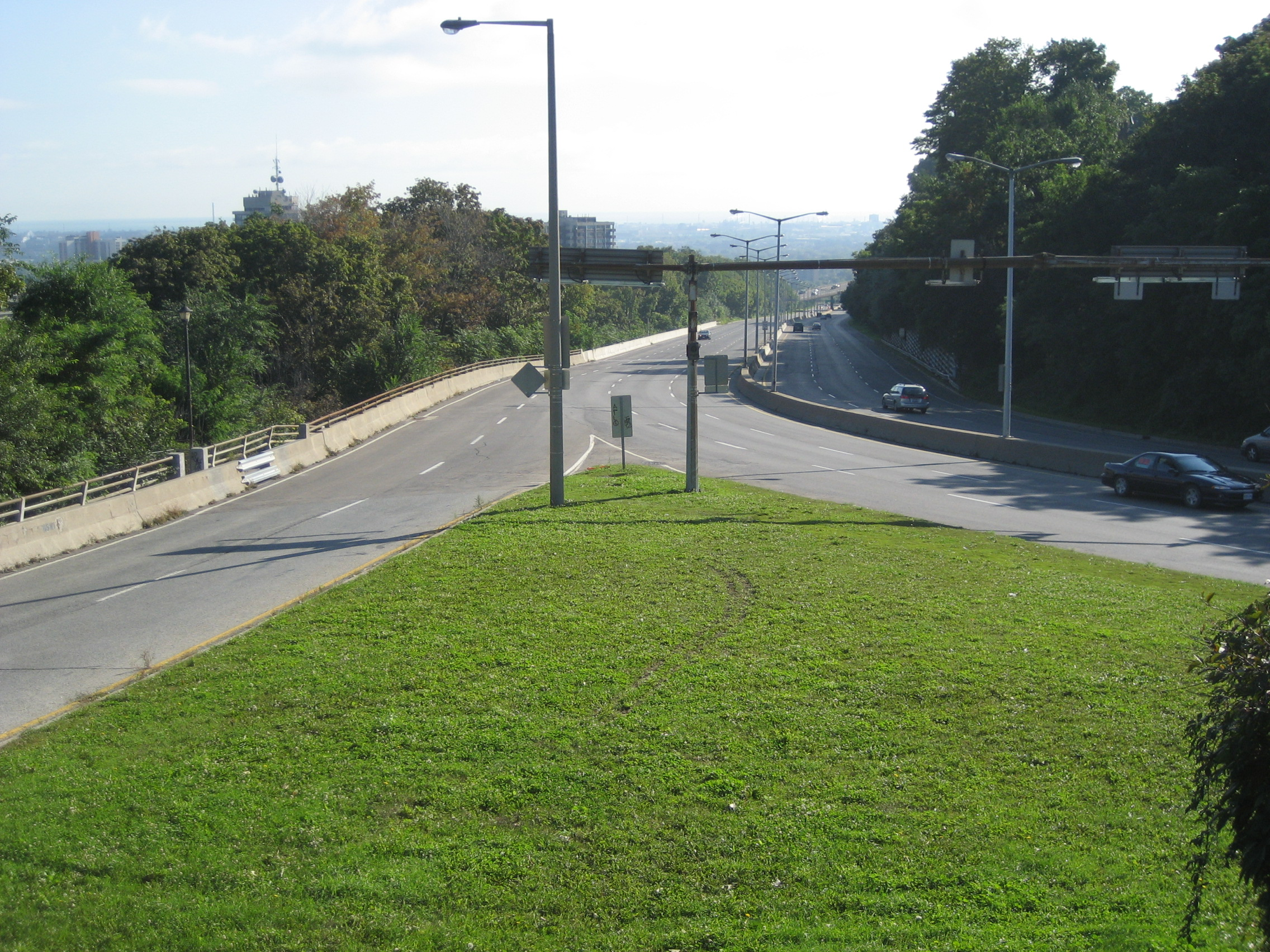
Claremont Access, mountain-access road

James Street, at the base of the Niagara Escarpment was the site of the city's first Incline railway (1892–1932). Back then, the incline railway on James Street was known as the Hamilton & Barton Incline Railway. It connected to present day Upper James Street. The city's second Incline railway on Wentworth Street South, (1895–1936), was known as the Eastend Incline Railway but was often called, The Mount Hamilton Incline Railway. The Eastend Incline on Wentworth Street was electrically operated and the Westend Incline on James Street depended on steam for its power.

In 1924, following the city's booming development in the east, there was some serious discussion regarding the addition of a third incline railway. The two locations considered at the time were Sherman Avenue or Ottawa Street South. The population of Hamilton Mountain at the time was 6,000.

In 1929, the city's brochures were using the motto, "The City Beautiful and Hub of Canadian Highways" as well as "The City of Opportunity". In regards to the incline railways, the brochures go on to boast, "There is no finer view anywhere on the North American continent than the panorama to be seen from the Hamilton mountain. The city below, the blue waters of Hamilton harbour and Lake Ontario. In the background, flanked on the east by the famous Niagara Fruit District and on the west by the beautiful Dundas Valley and a range of hills, combine to make a picture no artist could paint. There are several roads leading up to the summit and you can drive upon "high", but if you want to enjoy a unique experience and give the family a thrill, drive your car onto one of the Incline Railways and you will have something to tell the folks about when you go back home."

Construction began in November 1890 with the clearing of the right of way between James Street South and the Caledonia Road near the site of the Mountain View Hotel. The double tracks were 700 feet in length on a grade of 31% to overcome the 195-foot rise of the escarpment. Over half the line was supported on trestles which, at their maximum, held the 36-foot-long cars 50 feet above the ground. Stationary engines drew the cars to the top using steel cables.

Opened June 11, 1892, it was heavily used by residents and tourists alike. The 75-second ride provided a convenient link between the city and Barton Township for both pedestrian and horse-drawn traffic. Improved mountain access roads and the rise in popularity of motorized traffic caused a steadily declining numbers of customers. The line ceased operation on December 26, 1931.

The abandoned rails and equipment were removed during World War II and the right of way came under the jurisdiction of the Hamilton Parks Board.

=== Today ===
John C. Munro Hamilton International Airport or Hamilton International, is an international airport and is named for John C. Munro, a Hamilton Member of Parliament and cabinet minister. John Munro, elected to the House of Commons of Canada in the 1962 election, and served continuously as a Member of Parliament (MP) for Hamilton, Ontario. Munro was appointed to Cabinet by Prime Minister Pierre Trudeau, and served variously as Minister of Amateur Sport, Minister of Health and Welfare and Minister of Labour from 1968 to 1978 when he was forced to resign from over the "Skyshops" scandal. The airport was originally built in 1940 as the Mount Hope Airport, a Royal Canadian Air Force base. After the war, the airport gradually shifted towards civil use, The military ceased using it as a base in 1964. In 1994 Transport Canada announces it will divest itself of local and regional airports. The region of Hamilton issues a request for proposals from private firms to run the airport. In 1996 Hamilton International Airport Limited (HIAL) is the fully owned subsidiary of TradePort International Corporation. HIAL begins to manage the Hamilton/John C. Munro International Airport. TradePort, winner of the bid to take over the airport, assumes responsibility to manage, finance and operate it under a 40-year lease.

The Canadian Warplane Heritage Museum is a major Canadian aviation museum. It is located at the John C. Munro International Airport. The museum is a non-profit organization whose mandate is to acquire, document, preserve and maintain a complete collection of aircraft that were flown by Canadians and the Canadian military services from the beginning of the Second World War to the present.

== Landmarks ==
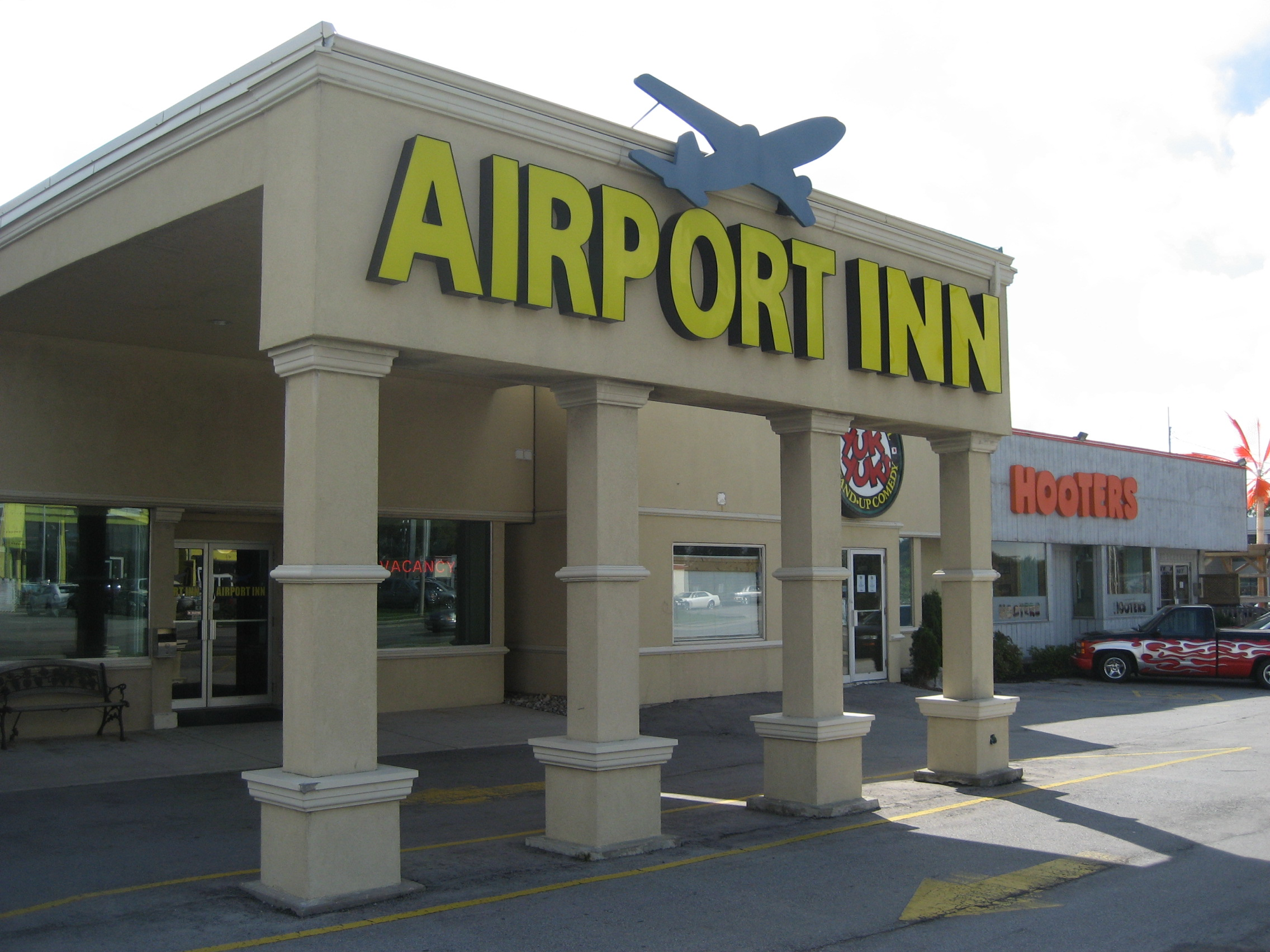
Airport Inn

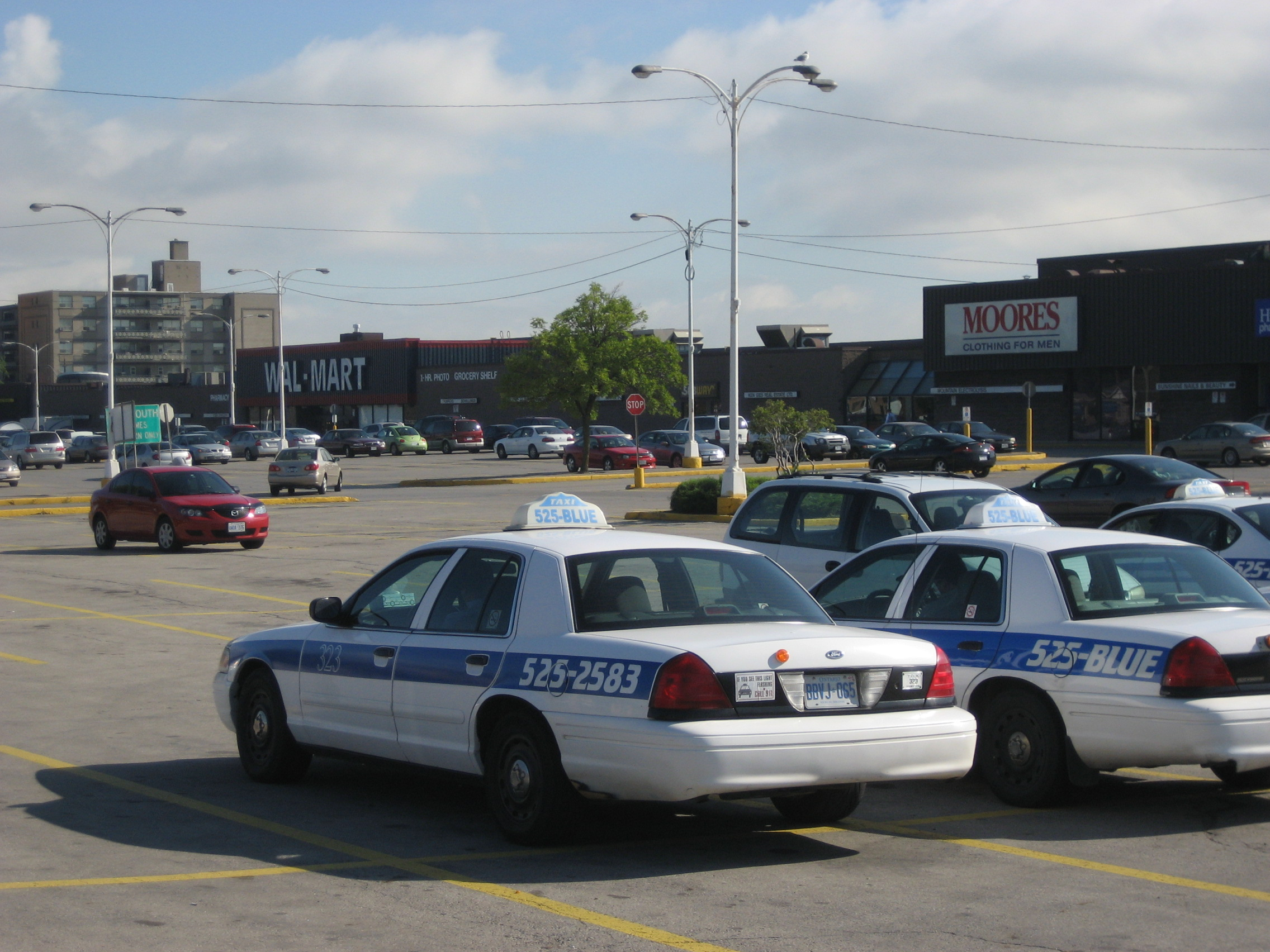
Mountain Plaza Mall

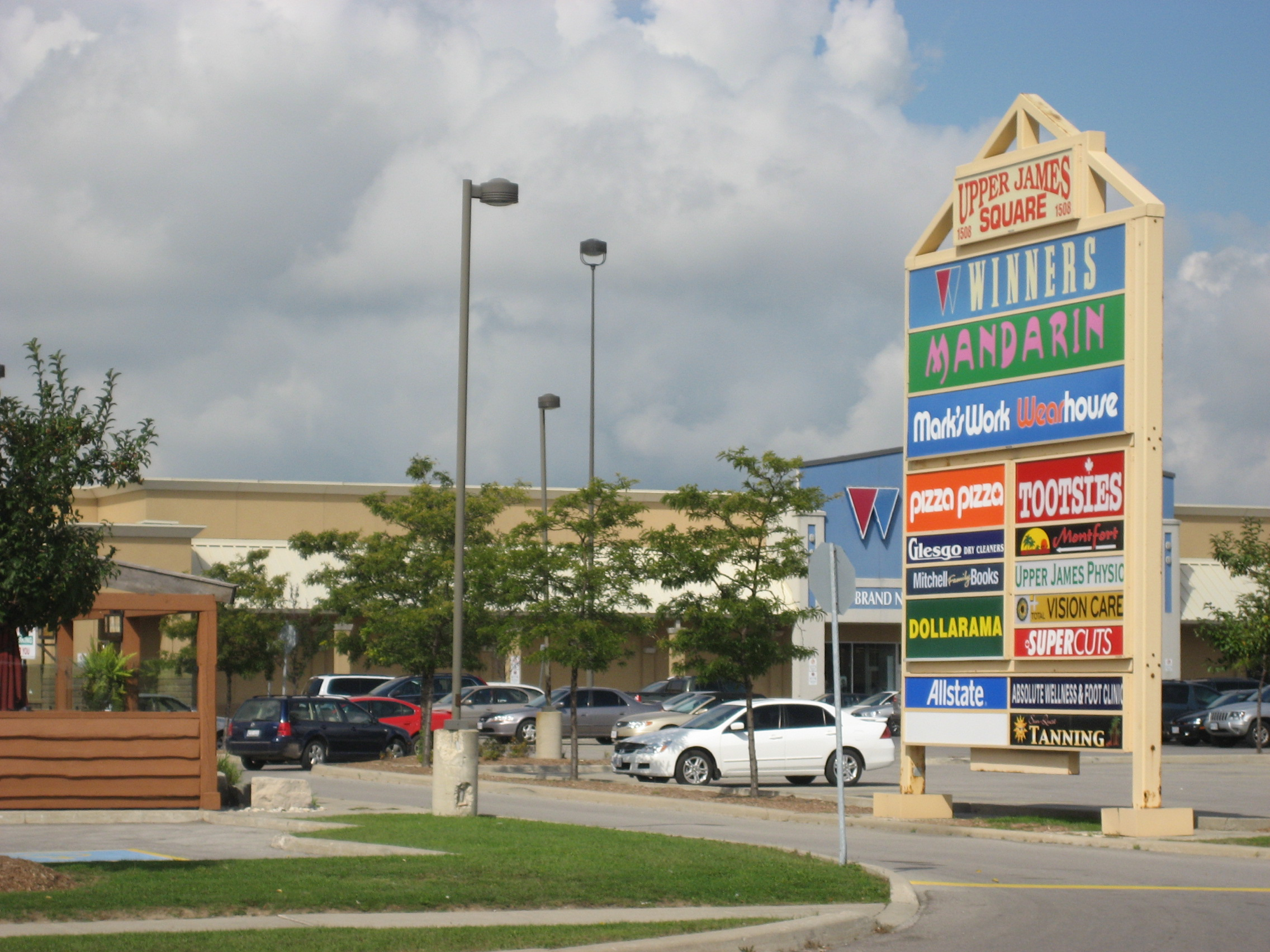
Upper James Square

Note: Listing of Landmarks from North to South.

- James Street Stairway (second upper level), 300-metres East of the lower section stairs.
- Bruce Trail
- Claremont Access (mountain-access road)
- Niagara Escarpment (mountain)
- Southam Park
  - Old site of the Hamilton & Barton Incline Railway (West-end Incline Railway)
  - Old site of the Mountain View Hotel
- Unity Church on the Mountain (church)
- St. Peter & Paul Church (off Brucedale Avenue)
- Upper James Court (Two 3-storey apartment complexes)
- Delmonico (15-storey apartment building)
- Mountain Plaza Mall
- Mohawk Plaza (shopping/ commercial)
- Butty Tower (10-storey apartment building)
- Ridgemount Junior Public School (off Hester Street)
- Dave Andreychuk Mountain Arena & Skating Centre (off Hester Street)
- Mohawk Ford dealership
- Upper James Toyota dealership
- Cresmount Funeral Home/ Upper James Chapel
- Lincoln M. Alexander Parkway, ‘The LINC'
- John Bear GM used vehicles dealership
- Airport Inn (hotel)
- Audi/ Volkswagen dealership
- Courtyard by Marriott Hamilton (hotel)
- Barton Stone Church (the church that Stone Church Road is named after)
- Dr. William Berthume Park
- Subaru Hamilton car dealership
- Upper James Odeon Cineplex (theatre) (closed Dec. 2008)
- Upper James Square (shopping/ commercial)
- Mitsubishi dealership
- Nissan dealership
- South Hamilton Square (shopping/ commercial)
- Sharples Wholesale Greenhouses
- HSR Mountain garage
- St. Paul's Glanbrook Church
- Super 8 Motel
- Mount Hope Post Office
- Willow Valley Golf Course (18 holes, public)
- Southern Pines Golf & Country Club (18 holes, semi-private)
- Chippewa Creek Golf & Country Club (27 holes, semi-private), in Mount Hope. 6,300 yard, par 72 course offers a diverse 27 holes, irrigated fairways, elevated tees.
- John C. Munro Hamilton International Airport
  - Canadian Warplane Heritage Museum

== Communities ==
Note: Listing of neighbourhoods from north to south.

- Southam
- Bonnington
- Yeoville
- Kernighan
- Ryckmans Corners
- Kennedy/ Allison, Upper James cuts through these two neighbourhoods
- Twenty Place
- North Glanford
- Mount Hope

== Images ==
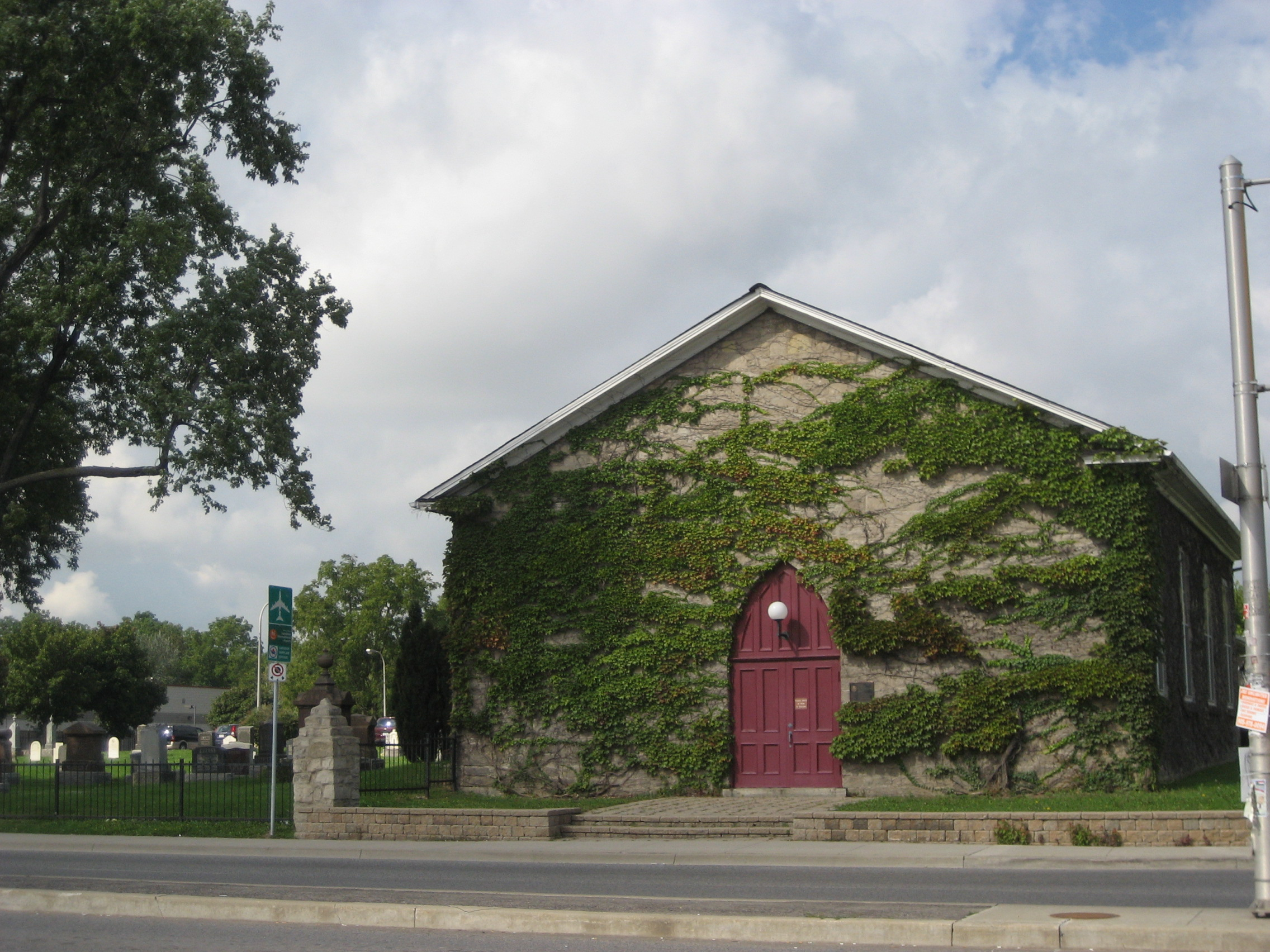
Barton Stone Church

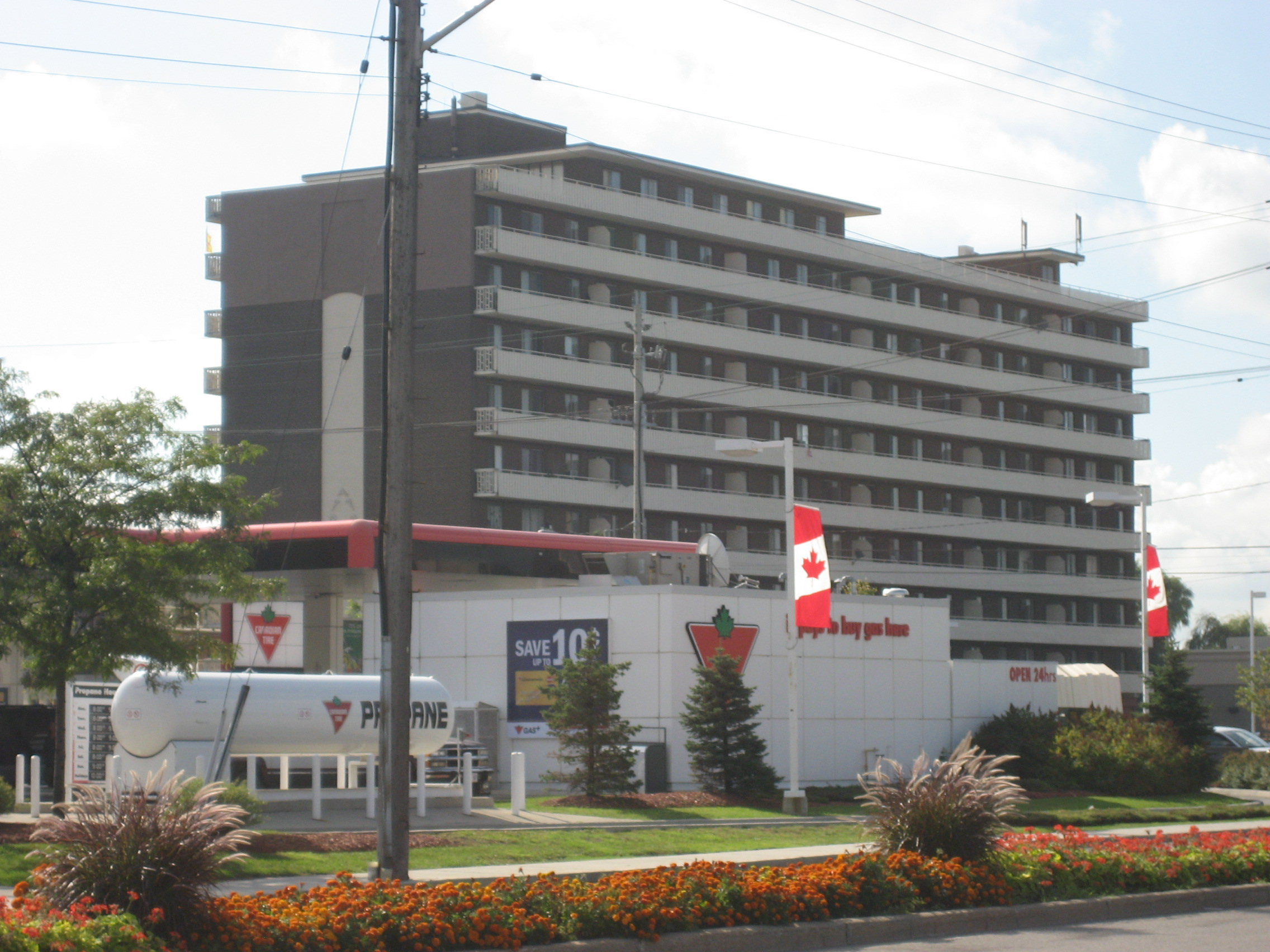
Butty Tower Apartments
