= Nell Franzen =

American actress

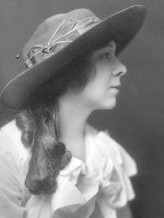
- Franzen ca. 1922
- Born: November 17, 1889; Portland, Oregon, U.S.
- Died: August 21, 1973 (aged 83); Orange, California, U.S.
- Resting place: Forest Lawn Memorial Park, Glendale, California; 34.1252°N 118.2437°E
- Occupation: Actress
- Years active: 1913–1924

Nell W. Franzen (November 17, 1889 – August 21, 1973) was an American film and stage actress of the silent era. A native of Portland, Oregon, Franzen began her career acting in local theatre. She signed with the Baker Theatre Company and performed in various stage productions, becoming a prolific stage actress in the Pacific Northwest.

She later moved to Los Angeles in 1913 to pursue a career in silent films, signing a contract with the America Film Company. One of her earliest film appearances was in Love and the Law (1913) with Wallace Reid, followed by 1916's Lord Loveland Discovers America, and Embers. Franzen made her final film appearance in 1924 before retiring from acting.

== Early life ==
Nell Franzen was born on November 17, 1889, in Portland, Oregon to John O'Flarrity Franzen and Mary Ellen Coshow. According to the 1930 United States census, Franzen's father was from Massachusetts, and her mother a native of Missouri. She was the second of two children; she had one older sister, Mae Frances Franzen.

== Career ==
=== Stage career ===
She began her career as an actress working in stock theater. She began performing onstage with the Baker Stock Company at their Baker Theatre location in Portland in 1910, under stage director Marshall Farnum. She appeared in the stage production of The Toyshop in 1908, and also performed with the Sanford Stock Company in Vancouver, British Columbia.

In 1912, Franzen appeared with the Harry Corson Clarke theatre company in Honolulu, Hawaii.

=== Films ===
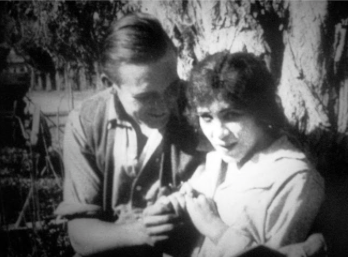
Franzen with Wallace Reid in Love and the Law (1913)

After moving to Los Angeles to pursue a career in silent films, Franzen toured the world performing for veterans in soldier's camps during World War I alongside fellow silent film star Neva Gerber.

Among her earliest credits was opposite Wallace Reid in Love is the Law (1913). In a 1916 issue of Motography, it was noted: "Nell Franzen, who has been playing minor parts in American film productions, is climbing up in the profession...Miss Franzen won her advancement through the good work done in the small parts given her. She is small and pretty and has a pleasing screen appearance."

Her success with audiences and critics led to larger roles in silent films, most of them with the American Film Company of Santa Barbara, in which she often acted opposite Constance Crawley and Arthur Maude; these roles included parts in Lord Loveland Discovers America (1916) and Embers (1916). She also appeared in the first chapter of the film serial The Diamond from the Sky with Lottie Pickford.

She also continued to work in theatre, performing in a touring one act play titled "Room 13," written by Sherwood MacDonald, opposite Helen Emma Reaume, wife of Tyrone Power. The one-act toured throughout southern California in 1919.

== Personal life ==
According to the California Death Index, she died on August 21, 1973, in Orange, California, at the age of 83. She is interred at Forest Lawn Memorial Park in Glendale, California, alongside her mother, Mary, and sister, Mae.

== Credits ==
=== Filmography ===
Year	Title	Role	Notes	Ref.
1913	Love and the Law	—N/a		
1913	The Ashes of Three	—N/a		
1915	Ima Simp, Detective	—N/a		
1915	The Ladder of Love	John's Sister		
1915	The Diamond from the Sky	—N/a	Ch. 1 of serial	
1915	The Trail of the Serpent	Carlotta		
1915	Film Tempo	Charlotte Briggs		
1915	In the Sunset Country	Madge, The Lost Soul		
1915	Yes or No	—N/a		
1916	Time and Tide	Ruth Walters		
1916	Dust	—N/a		
1916	Lord Loveland Discovers America	Izzy		
1916	Life's Blind Alley	Rose McKee		
1916	Embers	Maysie Stafford		
1916	Revelations	Marie		
1916	The Courtesan	Bettie Howard		
1916	Purity	Maiden		
1916	The Strength of Donald McKenzie	—N/a		
1924	Sagebrush Gospel	Mrs. Harper		

=== Stage credits ===
Year	Title	Role	Location
1908	The Toyshop	Doll	Baker Theatre, Portland, Oregon, U.S.
1909	Merely Mary Ann	Sister Trippitt	Baker Theater, Portland, Oregon, U.S.
1910	Under Southern Skies	Anner Lizer	The Spokane in Spokane, Washington, U.S.
1910	The Prince Chap	Phoebe Puckers	Baker Theater, Portland, Oregon, U.S.
1910	The Man from Mexico	—N/a	Baker Theater, Portland, Oregon, U.S.
1910	All the Comforts of Home	Emily Pettibone	Baker Theater, Portland, Oregon, U.S.
1910	Sapho	Soubrise	Baker Theater, Portland, Oregon, U.S.
1911	Brown's in Town	Freda Von Hollenbeck	Bungalow Theater, Portland, Oregon, U.S.
1919	Room 13	—N/a	San Diego, California; Los Angeles, California, U.S.

== Sources ==
- "At the Theaters: "Sapho" at the Baker". The Morning Oregonian: 15. June 13, 1910.
- "The Baker Chain of High Class Stock Organizations" (PDF). The New York Dramatic Mirror. New York City, New York. December 21, 1910.
- "Baker Company Draws Big House". The Spokane Daily Chronicle. December 5, 1910.
- "Cast of Characters to Take Part in "The Toyshop"". The Sunday Oregonian. June 22, 1908.
- "Charming Portland Actress Pleases Patrons at the Baker Theatre". The Morning Oregonian. April 13, 1910.
- "Director Claims Fast System of Longhand". The Los Angeles Herald. May 20, 1919.
- Fleming, E.J. (2013). Wallace Reid: The Life and Death of a Hollywood Idol. McFarland. ISBN 978-0-786-47725-8.
- Flowers, John; Frizler, Paul (2004). Psychotherapists on Film, 1899-1999. Vol. 1. McFarland. ISBN 978-0-786-41297-6.
- Greene, Arthur A. (May 10, 1909). "At the Theaters". The Morning Oregonian.
- Jura, Jean-Jacques; Bardin, Rodney Norman (1999). Balboa Films: A History and Filmography of the Silent Film Studio. McFarland. ISBN 978-0-786-43098-7.
- Lentz, Harris M. (1996). Western and Frontier Film and Television Credits 1903-1995. McFarland. ISBN 978-0-786-40217-5.
- Logan, John F. (May 28, 1910). "Baker Stock Company Reopened and Demonstrated Its Ability - Bills of the Week". The New York Dramatic Mirror. New York City, New York.
- Long, Bruce (2004) [1991]. William Desmond Taylor: A Dossier. Scarecrow Press. ISBN 978-0-810-84171-0.
- "May 27, 1911". The Eugene Guard. Eugene, Oregon. May 27, 1911.
- Woodruff, Paul M., ed. (1916-06-10). "June Americans: Santa Barbara Studios of American Companies..." Motography: The Motion Picture Trade Journal. XV (24). Chicago, Illinois: Electricity Magazine Corporation: 20.
- "New Bills at Theaters". The Morning Oregonian. March 6, 1911.
- "Portland Girl Here on Vacation From Film Work". The Sunday Oregonian. April 10, 1921.
- Schilling, Lester Lorenzo (1961). The History of the Theatre in Portland, Oregon, 1846-1949. Vol. 2. University of Wisconsin--Madison.
