= John Sayer Crawley =

English actor (1867–1948)

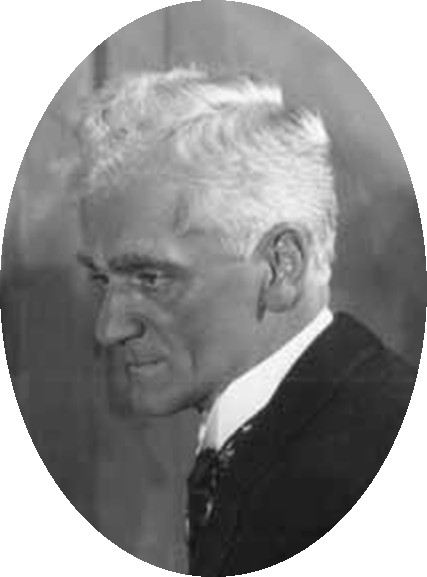
- Crawley, sometime before 1923
- Born: 8 March 1867; Upper Heyford, Northamptonshire, England
- Died: 7 March 1948 (aged 80); New York City, United States
- Other names: J. Sayre Crawley; Sayre Crawley
- Occupation: Actor
- Years active: 1897–1948
- Spouses: Constance Crawley (m. 1892; died 1919) Mary Ward Holton (m. 1922)
- Children: Vere Crawley

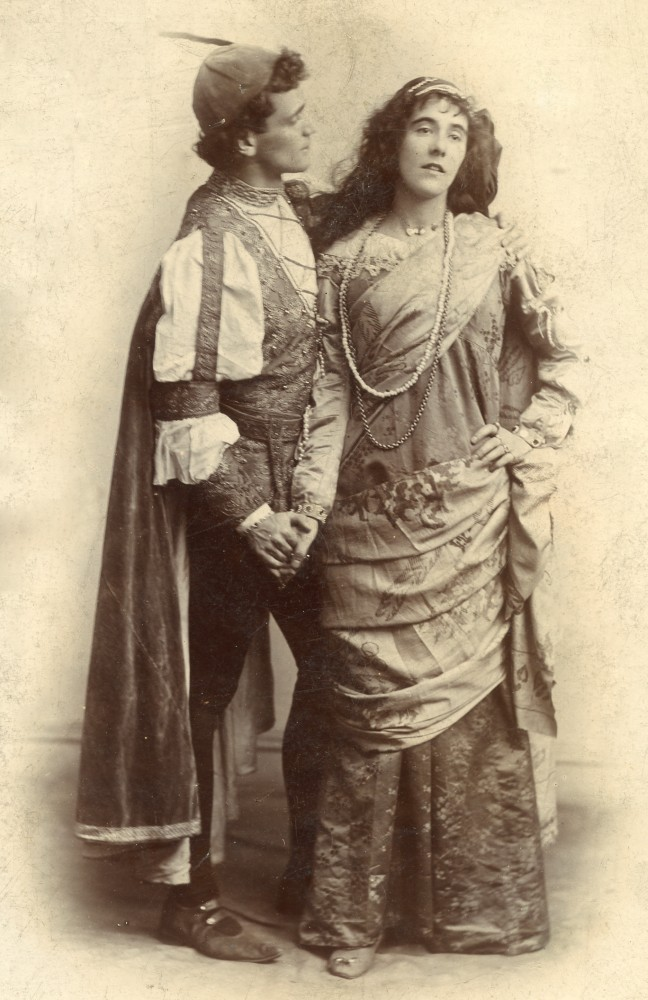
John Sayer Crawley with his first wife, Constance Crawley, c. 1899, in South Africa with Henry Irving's stage company

John Sayer Crawley (8 March 1867 – 7 March 1948) was an English actor who, as Sayre Crawley, spent more than 40 years in American theatre playing roles on Broadway and at the Garden Theatre, among other venues.

Crawley served briefly as an officer in the British army before marrying Constance Thompson in 1892 in England. Both he and his wife sought acting roles, which resulted in their coming to the United States in 1902 with the Ben Greet Players. They starred in Ben Greet productions on both coasts, with Constance, under her married name of Constance Crawley, gaining wide attention in the West as a Shakespearean actress, while Crawley, first under his stage name of J. Sayre Crawley, and later as simply Sayre Crawley, found his best success in the East playing supporting actor and character actor roles in Broadway theatre. As their careers took separate directions, Constance and Sayre separated, with Constance eventually moving to Los Angeles where she starred in several silent films, and Sayre continuing his acting career in New York City.

Constance Crawley died in 1919, after which Sayre in 1922 married his second wife, Mary Ward Holton (1888–1966), who had performed on Broadway under the stage name of Mary Ward. Although he continued in Broadway productions during the 1920s and 1930s, sometimes sharing the stage with Mary Ward, Sayre also did Shakespeare plays at the Garden Theatre, starring opposite Sybil Thorndike, Sydney Greenstreet and others. He was also a charter member with Eva Le Gallienne's Civic Repertory Theatre. When he died on 7 March 1948 in New York, his obituary in The New York Times noted that he had "devoted his career to the New York stage since the turn of the century."

Sawyer had a long friendship with Sybil Thorndike, whom he had known since 1904 when both were members of the Ben Greet players on Greet's third North American Tour. Thorndike refers to Crawley in her letters as "Master Rawdon", after the character Rawdon Crawley in Vanity Fair, and writes that she and others looked up to him as an older brother. Apparently, he was often referred to as Rawdon Crawley among friends and family, both in jest, and in reference to his relationship with his first wife Constance Crawley.

== Selected Broadway appearances ==
- Everyman (1902–1903)
- Twelfth Night (1904, 1912–1913, 1919, 1920, 1926)
- Romeo and Juliet (1910, 1923, 1930)
- Hamlet (1913, 1919, 1920)
- The Cherry Orchard (1923, 1928, 1933)
- Peter Pan; or, the Boy Who Wouldn't Grow Up (1928)
- Hedda Gabler (1928)
- The Would-Be Gentleman (1932)
- Sentinels (1931–1932)
- Liliom (1932)
- Alice in Wonderland (1932; adapted by Eva Le Gallienne)
- L'Aiglon (1934)
- The Corn Is Green (1940–1942)
- The Late George Apley (1944–1945)
