= Lord Loveland Discovers America =

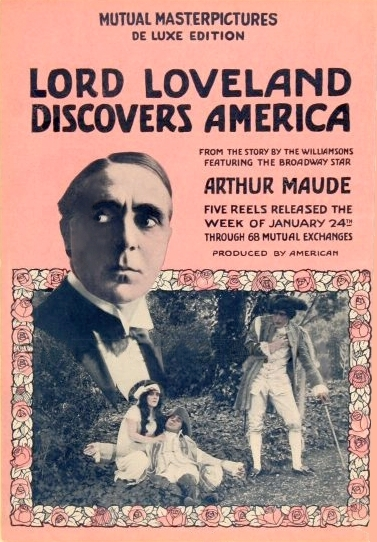
- Directed by: Arthur Maude
- Written by: C. N. & A. M. Williamson (novel)
- Starring: Arthur Maude; Constance Crawley
- Production company: America Film Company
- Distributed by: Mutual Film (USA)
- Release date: January 27, 1916
- Running time: 5 reels (about 12 minutes per reel)
- Country: United States
- Languages: Silent; English intertitles

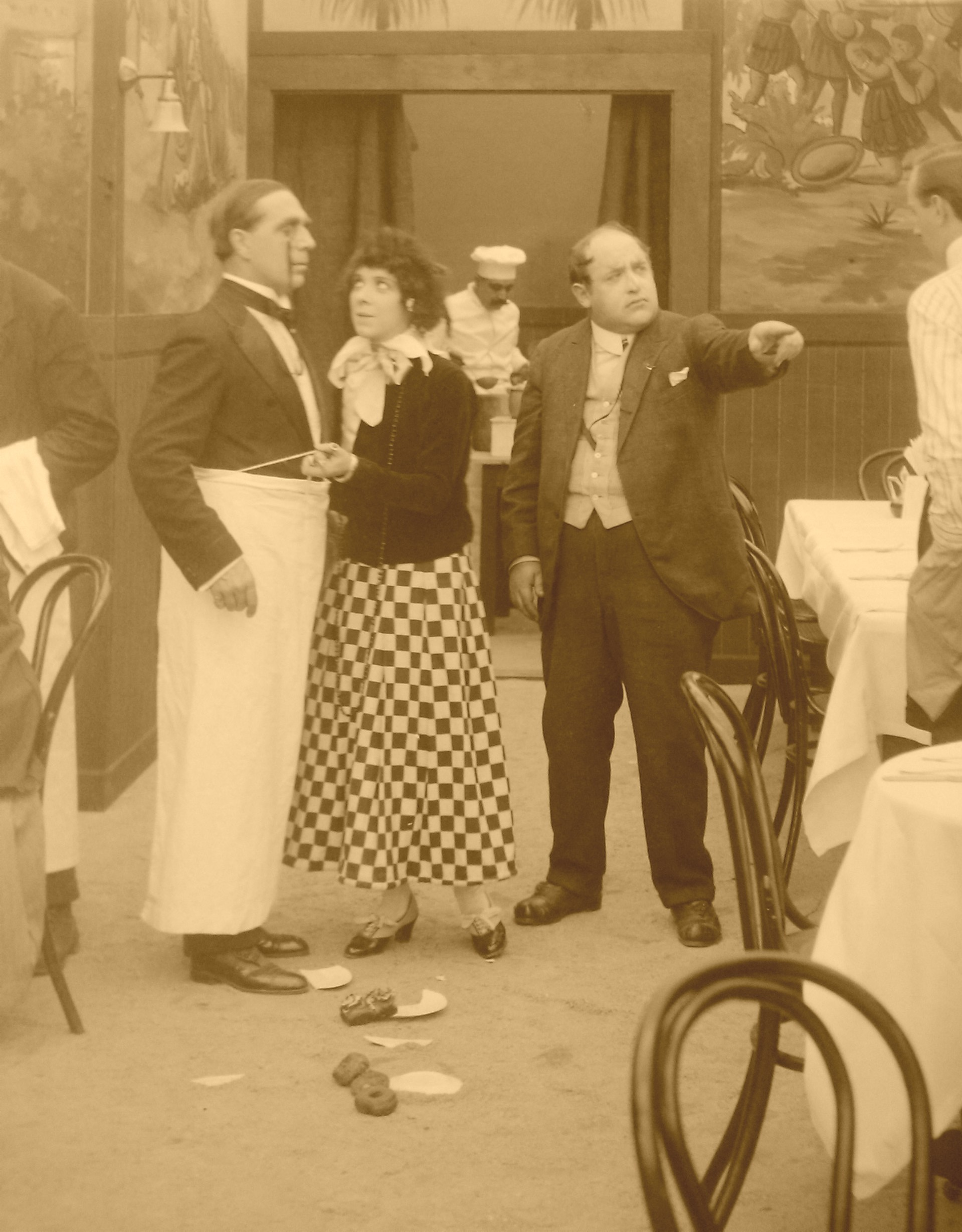
Arthur Maude, Nell Franzen and George Clancey in a scene from the 1916 silent film Lord Loveland Discovers America

Lord Loveland Discovers America is a 1916 silent movie that was made by the American Film Manufacturing Company at their Flying "A" Studios in Santa Barbara, California. The movie is based on a 1910 best-selling novel by Charles and Alice Williamson.

== Plot ==
Plagued by creditors, but with no money to pay his debts, Lord Loveland (Arthur Maude) leaves England and sails to the United States hoping to find a wealthy heiress to marry. During the voyage, he makes friends with a lady playwright named Leslie Dearmer (Constance Crawley), whom he likes, but believing her not to be the wealthy heiress he seeks, he is reluctant to develop their friendship further. Leslie likes Loveland also and tries to help him after the ship arrives in port.

Unfortunately, they part unexpectedly when Loveland joins a theater troupe and suddenly leaves town, hoping that he can make some quick money as the troupe tours across the country. But when the troupe performs one of Leslie's plays without her permission, she tracks them down, not realizing that Loveland is among them.

Finally catching up with the troupe, Leslie is surprised and overjoyed to find Loveland once again, and she gives him a job driving her car. Although Loveland still intends to marry a millionaire, he falls in love with Leslie, and after she tells him that she actually is an heiress, both their dreams come true when he asks her to marry him.

== Cast ==
- Arthur Maude
- Constance Crawley
- William A. Carroll
- George Clancey
- Nell Franzen
- William Frawley (film debut)
- Charles Newton
