= The Wraith of Haddon Towers =

- Directed by: Arthur Maude
- Starring: Arthur Maude; Constance Crawley
- Production company: American Film Company as Clipper Star Features
- Distributed by: Mutual Film (USA)
- Release date: January 1, 1916
- Running time: 3 reels
- Country: United States
- Languages: Silent; English intertitles

The Wraith of Haddon Towers is a 1916 silent movie that is considered to be one of the first in the genre of horror films.

== Plot ==
Phillip Drummond (Arthur Maude) is summoned from America to England to attend the bedside of his dying uncle, the Baron Drummond. Upon arriving at the castle where the baron lives, Phillip learns that he has a long-dead ancestor, also named Phillip Drummond, whose murder a century earlier is still a mystery. In a room of the castle that is always kept locked, he encounters the female spirit (Constance Crawley) of his dead ancestor's past lover. Phillip's interest in the paranormal leads him to seek out the haunts of this ghost, during which he finds out that he himself is actually the reincarnation of the former Phillip Drummond. His wife then arrives from America, just in time to find Phillip's body still warm after his spirit has departed to be with the "Wraith of Haddon Towers."

== Cast ==
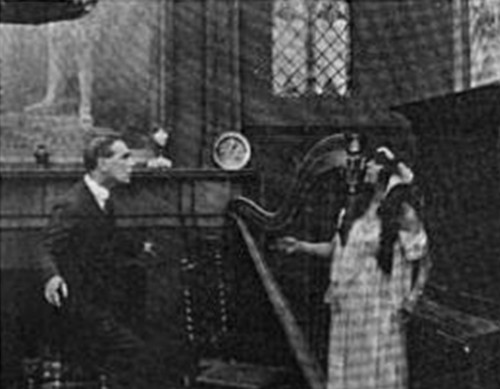
Phillip Drummond encounters the wraith of Haddon Towers

- Constance Crawley
- Arthur Maude
- Beatrice Van
- Leslie Reed
