= Embers (1916 film) =

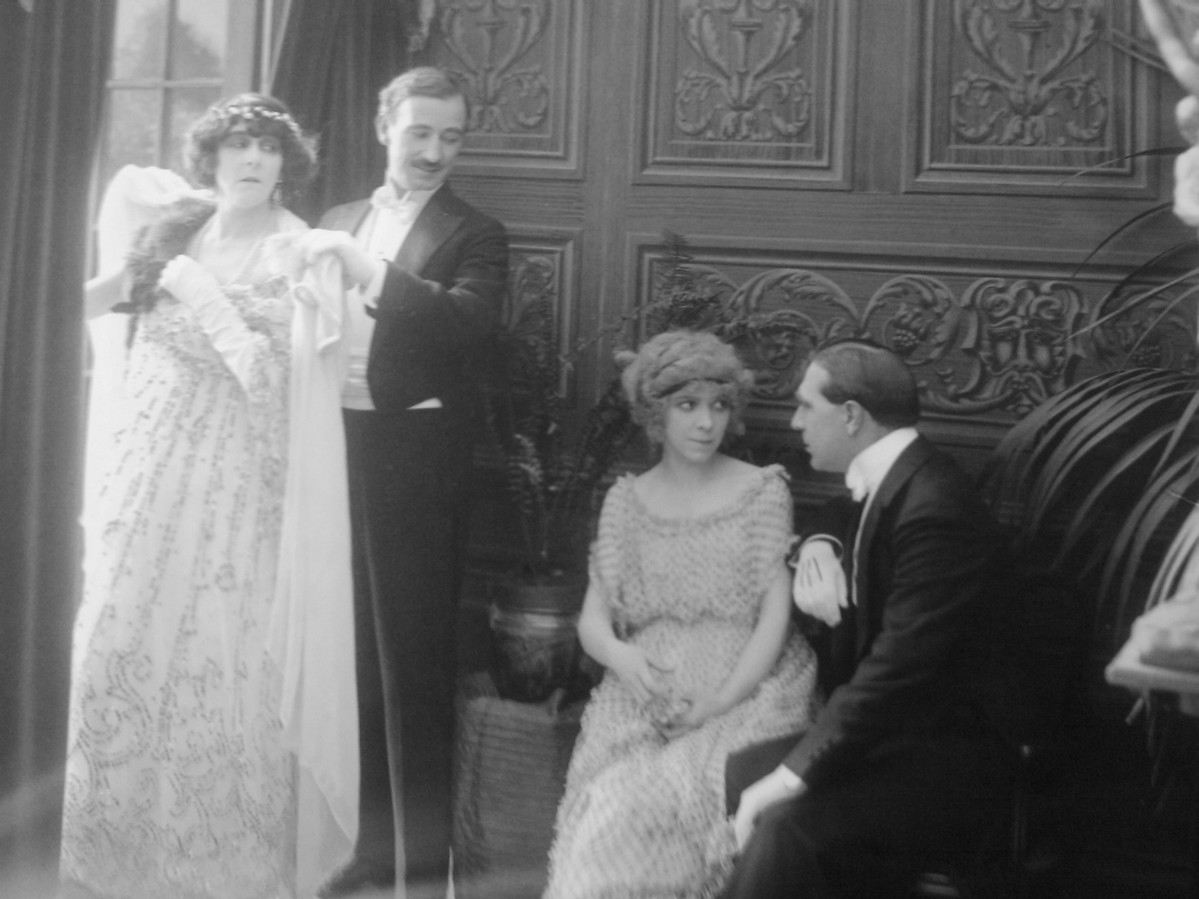
- From left to right: Constance Crawley, William Carroll, Nell Franzen and Arthur Maude in a scene from the film
- Directed by: Arthur Maude
- Starring: Arthur Maude; Constance Crawley
- Production company: America Film Company
- Distributed by: Mutual Film (USA)
- Release date: March 2, 1916
- Running time: 5 reels
- Country: United States
- Languages: Silent; English intertitles

Embers is a 1916 silent movie that was made by the American Film Manufacturing Company at their Flying "A" Studios in Santa Barbara, California.

== Plot ==
Rhea Woodley (Constance Crawley) and her husband Martin (Arthur Maude) have a baby, but the child dies soon after birth, and Rhea's doctor tells her that she cannot risk another pregnancy. Devastated, Rhea becomes withdrawn, and Martin, who is continuing to live an active life, begins to show interest in Rhea's lively cousin Maysie Stafford (Nell Franzen). Wesley Strange (William Carroll), a former suitor of Rhea's, shows up unexpectedly, and when he observes Martin and Maysie flirting, he tells Rhea about it, hoping to drive the Woodleys apart. Rhea still loves Martin, but she fears that she can now no longer meet his needs, so she offers him a divorce, hoping that he can find happiness with her cousin. However, Martin still loves Rhea and declines her offer. Desperate to make Martin happy, Rhea next arranges for him to catch her faking a fondness for Wesley. Taken in by the ruse, Martin finally agrees to a divorce. Maysie then moves in to take over Martin's household, and Rhea, instead of taking up with Wesley, moves to a sanitarium, where she falls deeper and deeper into depression. Realizing that Rhea is fast losing the will to live, her doctor finds her an orphaned infant to care for, and the baby gives Rhea new meaning to her life. Martin meanwhile stumbles across Rhea's diary at his house and learns from it that she never really cared for Wesley Strange and that when he saw them together it was all a ruse to get him to agree to a divorce. He rushes to the sanitarium to be by Rhea's side, and when he finds her with the baby, the couple reconcile when they realize that they still love each other.

== Cast ==
- Constance Crawley as Rhea Woodley
- Arthur Maude as Martin Woodley
- Nell Franzen as Maysie Stafford
- William A. Carroll as Wesley Strange
