= A Jewel in Pawn =

1917 film

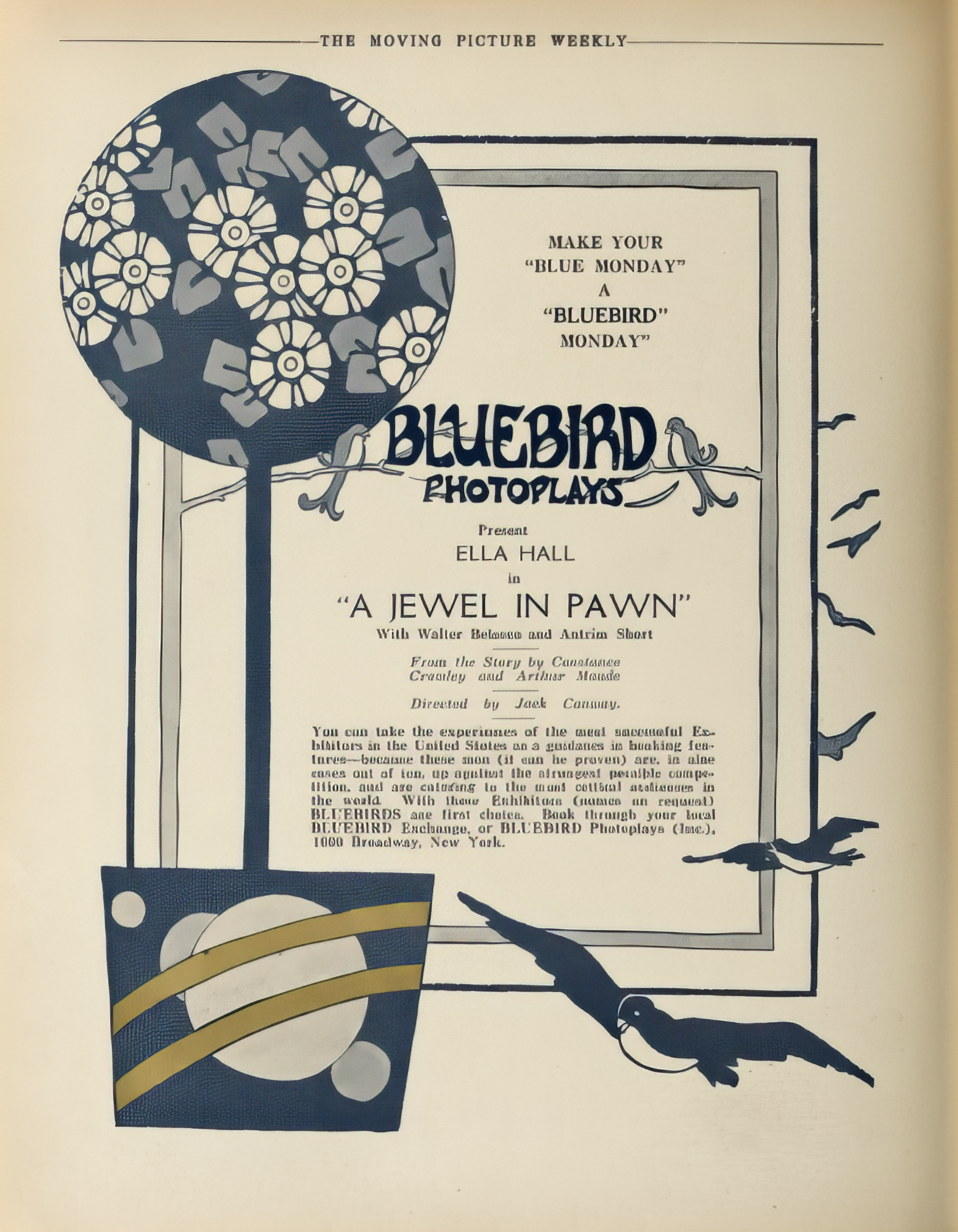
- Directed by: Jack Conway
- Written by: Constance Crawley; Arthur Maude; Maie B. Havey
- Starring: Ella Hall; Maie Hall; Antrim Short
- Cinematography: Edward A. Kull
- Production company: Universal Pictures
- Distributed by: Universal Pictures
- Release date: April 16, 1917
- Running time: 5 reels
- Country: United States
- Languages: Silent; English intertitles

A Jewel in Pawn is a 1917 American silent drama film directed by Jack Conway and starring Ella Hall, Maie Hall and Antrim Short.

== Cast ==
- Ella Hall as Nora Martin
- Maie Hall as Mrs. Martin
- Antrim Short as Jimmy
- Walter Belasco as Aaron Levovitch
- Jack Connolly as Bob Hendricks
- George C. Pearce as John Dane
- Marshall Mackaye as The Bully
- Jack Nelson as Percival Van Dyke

== Bibliography ==
- James Robert Parish & Michael R. Pitts. Film directors: a guide to their American films. Scarecrow Press, 1974.
