= Homespun Folks =

1920 film directed by John Griffith Wray

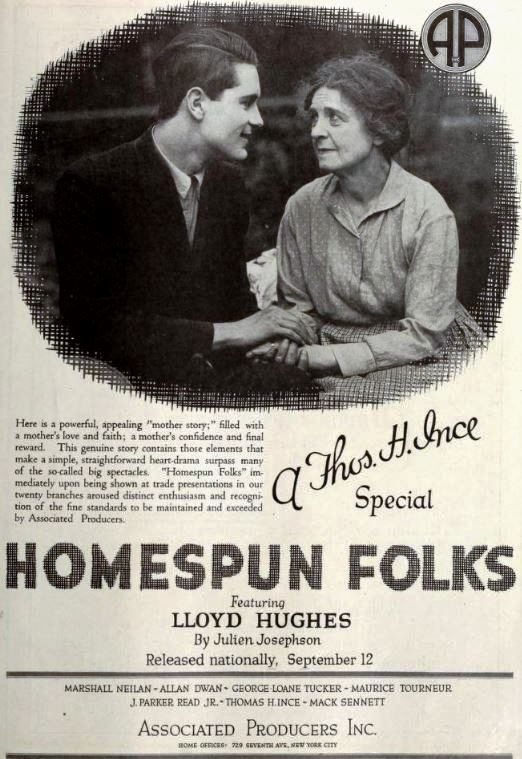
- Directed by: John Griffith Wray
- Written by: Julien Josephson
- Produced by: Thomas H. Ince
- Starring: Lloyd Hughes; Gladys George; George Webb
- Cinematography: Henry Sharp
- Production company: Thomas H. Ince Corporation
- Distributed by: Associated Producers
- Release date: September 12, 1920
- Running time: 60 minutes
- Country: United States
- Languages: Silent; English intertitles

Homespun Folks is a 1920 American silent drama film directed by John Griffith Wray and starring Lloyd Hughes, Gladys George and George Webb. It was produced on a budget of $137,000, and grossed $241,000 at the box offices.

== Plot ==
A young lawyer is appointed district attorney, but then finds himself accused of murder.

== Cast ==
- Lloyd Hughes as Joel Webster
- Gladys George as Beulah Rogers
- George Webb as Tracy Holt
- Al W. Filson as Pliny Rogers
- Fred Gamble as Gabe Howard
- Charles Hill Mailes as Caleb Webster
- Lydia Knott as Sarah Webster
- Gordon Sackville as Watt Tanner
- Willis Marks as Joseph Hargan
- James Gordon as Hilary Rose
- Edith Murgatroyd as Widow Stinson
- Jefferson Osborne as Nat Orinley

== Bibliography ==
- Lombardi, Frederic . Allan Dwan and the Rise and Decline of the Hollywood Studios. McFarland, 2013.
- Taves, Brian. Thomas Ince: Hollywood's Independent Pioneer. University Press of Kentucky, 2012.
