= Jefferson Osborne =

American actor

- Born: 25 September 1872; Bay City, Michigan
- Died: 11 June 1932 (aged 69); Hondo, California
- Occupation: Actor
- Years active: 1912 - 1920

Jefferson Osborne (25 September 1872 - 11 June 1932) was an American actor, who between 1912 and 1920 appeared in at least 60 silent films.

== Biography ==
Osborne was born J.W. Schroeder on 25 September 1872 in Bay City, Michigan. He acted as a supporting actor in several short comedy films known as the "Cub Comedies" that were produced by Mutual Films and featured comedian George Ovey as "merry Jerry". Osborne's last three films, which were produced in 1919 and 1920, were 5- to 6-reel dramas and adventure films of a more serious nature that ran an hour or more. Osborne died of a cerebral hemorrhage on 11 June 1932 in Hondo, California.

== Selected filmography ==
- Mary Magdalene (1914)
- Jerry in the Movies (1916)
- The Great Radium Mystery (1919)
- Homespun Folks (1920)
- Once a Plumber (1920)
