= Garden Theatre =

Former theater in Manhattan, New York

- Gilmore's Garden (~1870); Madison Square Garden (1880); Garden Theatre (1890)
- Interactive map of Garden Theatre
- Address: 55–61 Madison Avenue. and 22–32 E. 27th Street; New York City, New York; United States
- Coordinates: 40.743°N 73.986°W
- Owner: Madison Square Garden Company
- Operator: T. Henry French, A.M. Palmer; Charles Frohman, Gustav Amberg, William R. Coleman, Emanuel Reicher, Maurice Schwartz, others
- Capacity: 1,200, +400 standees
- Type: Broadway (until ~1910)

Construction
- Opened: September 27, 1890
- Closed: 1925
- Demolished: 1925
- Years active: 1890–1925
- Architect: McKim, Mead & White

The Garden Theatre was a major theater on Madison Avenue and 27th Street in Manhattan, New York City. The theatre opened on September 27, 1890, and closed in 1925. Part of the second Madison Square Garden complex, the theatre presented Broadway plays for two decades and then, as high-end theatres moved uptown to the Times Square area, became a facility for German and Yiddish theatre, motion pictures, lectures, and meetings of trade and political groups.

The Garden Theatre has been erroneously referred to as the Madison Square Garden Theatre. It was not related to a theater three blocks south (at Madison Avenue and 24th Street) that was called the Madison Square Theatre from 1879 to 1891 and later called Hoyt's Theatre.

== Building ==
The Garden Theatre was architecturally and structurally part of, but managed separately from, the Madison Square Garden (1890) complex designed by Stanford White of McKim, Mead & White, that replaced the original Madison Square Garden (1879) at the same site. Unlike most theatres of the day, patrons entered from street level and it was described as "fireproof", in an era when theatre fires were not uncommon. The auditorium had eight boxes, a gallery and a balcony, with 1,200 seats plus room for 400 standees. The building was 117 feet long and 70 feet wide, and the stage was 39 feet deep and 70 feet wide.

The Garden was the only New York theatre McKim, Mead & White designed, but they "provided an elegant interior...They introduced Beaux Arts classicism to playhouse design, inaugurating a new formalism and standard of decor that would influence theatre architecture for the next four decades. The coffered sounding board, the swag and lattice box fronts and proscenium are especially noteworthy." The interior was decorated "in the style of Louis XVI", with views of Versailles on the main curtain.

Besides the large arena itself, the Garden Theatre was one of three separately operated attractions in the Madison Square Garden complex, and the only one that met with any business success. The others were a concert hall and a restaurant. The theatre and the rest of the complex were razed in May 1925, and were replaced on the site by the New York Life Building.

== Broadway theatre ==
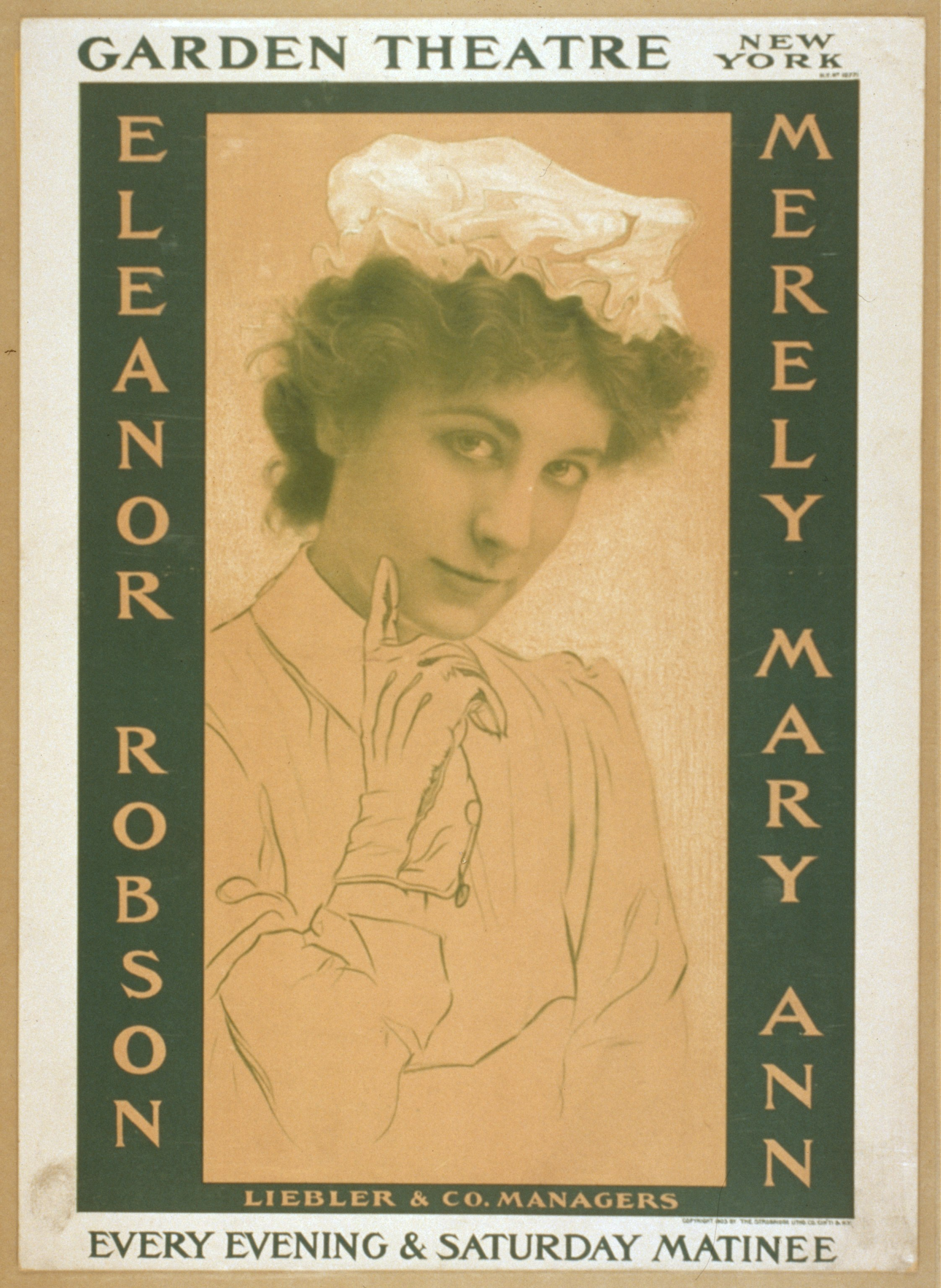
Poster for Israel Zangwill's Merely Mary Ann starring Eleanor Robson (1903)

The Garden Theatre presented a wide variety of dramas, musical comedies, and operas, both new plays and revivals, from 1890 to the approximately 1910, by which time it was increasingly used for extended, often lower-cost runs of plays first presented at other theatres.

The theatre was managed by T. Henry French from its opening until October 1893 when A.M. Palmer took over. Three years later Charles Frohman became manager.

In addition to productions ranging from one to over 100 performances, examples of which are below, in its heyday the theatre presented many repertory companies, with consistent casts offering rotating menus of plays, frequently for four-week engagements. Notable "rep companies" that appeared at the Garden:

- Richard Mansfield (1891 and 1896): George Bernard Shaw's Arms and the Man, Clyde Fitch's Beau Brummel, H. Greenough Smith's Castle Sombras, Mansfield's own Don Juan, or the Sad Adventures of Youth, T.R. Sullivan's Nero, Octave Feuillet's A Parisian Romance, A.C. Gunter's Prince Karl, Shakespeare's The Merchant of Venice and Richard III, and Mansfield's signature role(s) in T.R. Sullivan's Dr. Jekyll and Mr. Hyde.
- Mrs. Fiske (1896 ): her husband's Marie Deloche, Henrik Ibsen's A Doll's House, Dumas's Cesarine, and her own A Light from St. Agnes.
- Sarah Bernhardt and Coquelin (1900): Dumas's L Dame aux Camelias, Sardou's La Tosca, and Edmond Rostand's Cyrano de Bergerac and L'Aiglon. The five-week engagement featured Bernhardt's famous portrayal of the title role in Shakespeare's Hamlet, which was wildly popular, with speculators getting five times face value for tickets.
- E.S. Willard Repertory (1900–01 and 1902–03, four weeks each): T.W. Robertson's David Garrick, J.M. Barrie's The Professor's Love Story, J.J. Dilley and L. Clifton's Tom Pinch (adapted from Dickens's Martin Chuzzlewit, Henry Arthur Jones's The Middleman, Louis N. Parker's The Cardinal, and Herman Merivale and Palgrave Simpson's All For Her.
- Mrs. Patrick Campbell (1902): E.F. Benson's Aunt Jeannie, A. W. Pinero's The Second Mrs. Tanqueray, and Hermann Sudermann's The Joy of Living (translated by Edith Wharton). (1908): The Flower of Yamato translated by Vicomte Robert D'Humiere, and Elektra by Hugo von Hofmannsthal after Sophocles, translated by Arthur Symons.
- Robert B. Mantell (1905): Shakespeare's King Lear, Macbeth, Othello, and Hamlet; Brownlow Hill's The Dagger and the Cross, and Edward Bulwer-Lytton's Richelieu.
- Ben Greet Players (1907 and 1910): Shakespeare's As You Like It, Julius Caesar, Macbeth, The Merchant of Venice, A Midsummer Night's Dream, Much Ado About Nothing, The Tempest, and Twelfth Night; Christopher Marlowe's Doctor Faustus, Peter Dorland's Everyman, Charles Reade and Tom Taylor's Masks and Faces, Richard Brinsley Sheridan's The Rivals, Oliver Goldsmith's She Stoops to Conquer, and others. The 1907 tour included future stars Russell and Sybil Thorndike, and Sydney Greenstreet.

Examples of prominent actors and plays from this period are listed below.

== Later years: German and Yiddish theatre and other notable events ==
By 1910 the Garden's location and its relative paucity of hit productions led it to be considered marginal in comparison to the rising "Broadway" theatres in the Times Square area. For the theatre's last 15 years it was used for many purposes in addition to plays and operas, including motion picture exhibition, lectures, trade shows, political rallies and other civic meetings, and even church services. Most notably, a succession of German and Yiddish theatre groups presented plays at the theatre.

German theatrical manager and impresario Gustav Amberg took possession of the theatre early in 1911, moving his stock theatre company from the Irving Place Theatre. Amberg's "Neues Deutsches Theatre" presented Ernst Von Possart in Erekmann Chatrian's Freund (Friend) Fritz and Gotthold Ephraim Lessing's Nathan the Wise, and also presented plays such as By the King's Command, Moliere's The Learned Women, Bjornstjerne Bjornson's Das Fallissement (The Failure), Adolf Wilbrandt's The Daughter of Fabricus, and Shakespeare's The Merchant of Venice.

John E. Kellerd played Hamlet for 102 performances in 1912–13, arguably breaking the New York theatre record set by Edwin Booth's "100 Nights of Hamlet" at the Winter Garden in 1864–65. John Barrymore overlooked Kellerd's achievement and thought he had set a record with 101 consecutive performances in 1922–23 at the Booth Theatre; John Gielgud set (and still holds) the record in 1937 with 132 at the St. James Theatre.

Later in 1913, new manager William R. Coleman bowed to the pressure of the new theatre economy by lowering prices in order to fight competition from movies, intensifying the Garden's fall from the top echelon of New York theatres.

German actor-manager Emanuel Reicher leased the theatre in 1915 to run plays in the style of his Modern Stage group, along with a new group called the "American People's Theatre" that provided reduced-price tickets to working-class people who could not otherwise afford them. His daughter Hedwiga Reicher was part of his stock company. Reicher's production of Gerhart Hauptmann's The Weavers ran for 87 performances beginning in December 1915.

Lina Coen conducted Carmen at the Garden Theatre in February 1917, reportedly becoming the first woman to conduct an opera in New York City.

In April 1917, the Garden was the first major theatre to present an all-African American cast in a performance that "portrayed African American life seriously and sympathetically." The three one-act plays, presented under the general title Plays for a Negro Theater, were Simon the Cyrenian, The Rider of Dreams, and Granny Maumee. They were written by Ridgely Torrence and directed ("staged", in the parlance of the day) by Robert E. Jones.

In 1919 the Yiddish Art Theatre came to the Garden Theatre, first featuring and managed by Reicher and then by Maurice Schwartz, performing works by playwrights including Leonid Andreyev, S. Ansky, Sholem Aleichem, Maxim Gorky, Gerhart Hauptmann, Peretz Hirschbein, David Pinski, Arthur Schnitzler, George Bernard Shaw and Oscar Wilde. The Yiddish Art Theatre remained, on and off, for six years, frequently dropping the name "Garden" entirely from newspaper ads. In 1925, in the face of plans to tear down the Madison Square Garden complex, the Yiddish Art Theatre moved temporarily to the Nora Bayes Theatre and then to their own newly constructed theatre at Second Ave. and 12th St.

When the 1924 Democratic National Convention was held at Madison Square Garden, the Garden Theatre became a delegate's lounge area. Seats were covered with a false floor and Macy's department store donated oriental rugs, stuffed chairs and couches. And ashtrays—smoking was banned in the big arena but allowed in "Macy's Convention Club", so the theatre became the "smoke-filled room" for the record 103-ballot convention.

== Actors ==
These are among the actors who performed in three or more plays at the Garden Theatre (mainly in the theatre's top years, 1890–1910) and were, or later became, widely known for their work in theatre or in motion pictures. (List excludes those named above.)

- Anna Barton
- Rowland Buckstone
- Sayre Crawley
- William Courtenay
- Cecil B. De Mille
- Elwyn Eaton
- W.J. Florence
- Amelia Gardner
- Virginia Harned
- Mildred Holland
- Joseph Jefferson
- Nicholas Joy
- Lillie Langtry
- Cecilia Loftus
- Tully Marshall
- Henry Miller
- Helena Modjeska
- James Neil
- Franklin Pangborn
- Ernest Rowan
- Lillian Russell
- Marie Booth Russell
- E.H. Sothern
- Jack Standing
- George Vivian
- Ruth Vivian
- Violet Vivian
- Keith Wakeman
- John Wray

== Plays, playwrights, opening nights ==
Following are examples of plays that appeared at the Garden Theatre for at least 48 performances, or six weeks, between 1890 and the mid-1910s. Does not include dozens of benefits, concerts, lectures, amateur and student productions, short-stay touring performances, and revivals of these plays in subsequent months. (WP=World premiere, AP=American premiere.)

- Dr. Bill, Hamilton Aide, September 27, 1890. AP, 103 performances.
- Sunset, September 30, 1890. 100 performances.
- Betrothed, Alphonse Daudet, March 30, 1891. WP.
- La Cigale, Edmond Audran, October 26, 1891. AP (English language), 113 perfs.
- Ten Thousand a Year, Samuel Warren (novel), February 23, 1892. WP.
- As You Like It and Cymbeline, William Shakespeare, October 17, 1892.
- Mary Stuart, Friedrich Schiller, October 17, 1892.
- The Mountebanks, W.S. Gilbert and Alfred Cellier, October 1, 1893.
- The Poet and the Puppets, Charles Brookfield, March 4, 1893.
- The Professor's Love Story, James M. Barrie, October 27, 1893.
- 1492, R.A. Barnett, music by Carl Pflueger, May 2, 1894.
- Little Christopher Columbus (called Little Christopher after March 12, 1894), George R. Sims and Cecil Raleigh, music by Ivan Caryll and Gustave Kerker, October 15, 1894. 208 perfs.
- Trilby, Paul M. Potter, April 15, 1895. 208 perfs.
- Chimmie Fadden, Edward W. Townsend, January 13, 1896.
- His Absent Boy, Al. Neumann, June 4, 1896.
- Heartsease, J.I.C. Clarke, Charles Klein, November 1, 1897.
- A Bachelor's Romance, Martha Morton, September 20, 1897.
- The Master, Stuart Ogilvie, February 15, 1898.
- Cyrano de Bergerac, Edmond Rostand, March 10, 1898. NY premiere.
- The Christian, Hall Caine, November 28, 1898. 112 perfs.
- Hearts Are Trumps, Cecil Raleigh, February 21, 1900.
- Henry V, William Shakespeare, March 10, 1900.
- Under Two Flags, Paul M. Potter, May 2, 1901. 135 perfs.
- If I Were King, Justin Huntly McCarthy, October 14, 1901.
- Alice of Old Vincennes, Edward E. Rose, February 12, 1901.
- Maid Marian, Harry B. Smith, music by Reginald De Koven, January 27, 1902.
- Everyman, Peter Dorland, March 30, 1903.
- Ulysses, Stephen Phillips, September 14, 1903.
- Merely Mary Ann, Israel Zangwill, December 28, 1903. 148 perfs.
- The Secret of Polichinelle, Pierre Wolff, February 15, 1904.
- The College Widow, George Ade, September 30, 1904. 278 perfs.-longest of any production at this theatre.
- The Galloper, Richard Harding Davis, January 22, 1906.
- The Rejuvenation of Aunt Mary, Anne Warner, December 11, 1907.
- The Devil, Ferenc Molnar, August 18, 1908.
- Mary Jane's Pa, Edith Ellis, March 12, 1908.
- Hamlet, William Shakespeare, November 18, 1912. 102 perfs.
- The Weavers, Gerhart Hauptmann, December 14, 1915.

== Bibliography ==
- "Amberg Has Garden Theatre", New York Times, January 7, 1911, p. 9.
- Brown, Thomas Allston, A History of the New York Stage from the First Performance in 1732 to 1901, Volume III, (New York: Dodd, Mead and Company), 1903.
- Chapman, John, and Garrison P. Sherwood, eds., The Best Plays of 1894–1899, (New York: Dodd, Mead, & Company), 1955.
- "Concert in Garden Theatre", New York Times; January 16, 1911, p. 11.
- Crowther, Bosley, "Checking on the Bard: John Gielgud's Record-Breaking Run in Hamlet", New York Times, January 10, 1937, p. 155.
- Curtis, Susan, The First Black Actors on the Great White Way, (Columbia: University of Missouri Press), 2001, ISBN 0-8262-1330-8, ISBN 978-0-8262-1330-3
- "Emanuel Reicher Is Dead In Berlin", New York Times, May 17, 1924, p. 15.
- Garden Theatre, Internet Broadway Database (IBDB), www.ibdb.com. (lists productions 1894–1917.)
- "The Garden Theatre: Private Inspection of a Handsome New Playhouse", New York Times, September 21, 1890, p. 2.
- "The Garden Theatre", New York Times, September 28, 1890, p. 5.
- "Gielgud is Cheered as Hamlet Run Ends", New York Times, January 31, 1937, p. 48.
- Heine, Barbara, "The First Smoke-Filled Room", New York Magazine, July 19, 1976, p. 68.
- "Jewish Art Theatre to Have New Home" New York Times, August 19, 1925, p. 14.
- King, Moses, ed., King's Handbook of New York City: An Outline History and Description of the American Metropolis, (New York: Moses King), 1892.
- "Madison Square Garden Sold", New York Times, April 9, 1911, p. 1.
- Mantle, Burns, and Garrison P. Sherwood, eds., The Best Plays of 1899–1909, (Philadelphia: The Blakiston Company), 1944.
- Mantle, Burns, and Garrison P. Sherwood, eds., The Best Plays of 1909–1919, (New York: Dodd, Mead, & Company), 1933.
- Morrison, William, Broadway Theatres: History and Architecture, (New York: Dover Publications, Inc.), 1999. ISBN 0-486-40244-4 (pbk.)
- "News Of The Stage", New York Times, January 4, 1937, p. 21.
- "Plan to Give Dollar Plays on Broadway", New York Times, October 6, 1913, p. 7.
- "Sex Plays at 10, 20, 30 cents. Power of Money to be Shown by Stock Company at Garden Theatre", New York Times, October 17, 1913, p. 11.
- "600 Phone Lines Link Convention", New York Times, June 22, 1924, p. 7.
- "Three Negro Plays Played By Negroes: Interesting and Sympathetic Dramas by Ridgely Torrance are Inadequately Acted", New York Times, April 6, 1917, p. 11.
- "Transfigured Hall Awaits Convention", New York Times, June 20, 1924, p. 3.
- "Woman Wields The Baton: Lina Coen Conducts a Performance of Carmen in Garden", New York Times, February 8, 1917, p. 10.
- Woollcott, Alexander, "The Play: Hauptmann in Madison Square", New York Times, October 17, 1919, p. 15.
