= The Flag: A Story Inspired by the Tradition of Betsy Ross =

1927 film

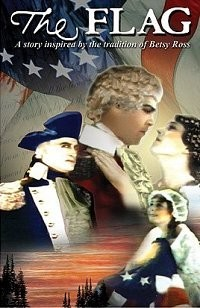
- Directed by: Arthur Maude
- Written by: Arthur Maude; L. V. Jefferson
- Starring: Francis X. Bushman; Enid Bennett; Johnnie Walker; Alice Calhoun
- Cinematography: Ray Rennahan
- Music by: Vivek Maddala
- Production companies: Metro-Goldwyn-Mayer; Technicolor Corporation
- Distributed by: Metro-Goldwyn-Mayer
- Release date: October 1, 1927
- Running time: 20 minutes
- Country: United States
- Languages: Silent; English intertitles
- Budget: $17,773.94

The Flag: A Story Inspired by the Tradition of Betsy Ross is a 1927 American silent fictionalized film short in two-color Technicolor, about the making of the U.S. flag by Betsy Ross. It was the first of the "Great Events" series co-produced by Technicolor and Colorcraft Pictures Inc., and distributed by Metro-Goldwyn-Mayer. The basically true story is combined with a completely fictional subplot in which a British soldier crosses enemy lines to visit his wife, a friend of Betsy Ross. This films survives.

== Plot ==
In Philadelphia, George Washington is having a meeting with many of his higher ups to discuss the new flag of the United States. Each delegate suggests using the flag of his state when Betsy Ross suggests creating an entirely new flag representing all thirteen of the states that will be personally designed by her. Washington likes this idea. The meeting ends with the members receiving word that more British troops have landed at Staten Island.

Meanwhile, across the British lines officer Charles Brandon rushes to Philadelphia to be with his wife Edith who is staying with Betsy Ross. Edith hides Charles but word soon spreads that a spy is hiding in the town. Betsy Ross completes the flag which pleases George Washington. After hearing of the spy, he orders his troops to search each house in the town but vouches for the house of Edith and Betsy. He goes up to their parlor room and notices someone is hiding behind the flag. It is Charles Brandon. Edith is distraught he is going to be executed.

Betsy tells Washington that the flag serves as protection for all under it and that executing him would violate the ethical standards they are fighting for. Washington says all spies should be executed but Charles explains he only came to see his wife behind enemy lines. Washington relents and says that when he is done he will be escorted back to his lines. Charles is exuberant and tells Washington that though America and Britain are enemies today they will be allies in the future. The movie closes with a British, American and French soldier of the WWI era marching side by side with their flags as allies.

== Cast ==
- Francis X. Bushman as George Washington
- Enid Bennett as Betsy Ross
- Johnnie Walker as Charles Brandon
- Alice Calhoun as Edith Brandon

== Production ==
The Flag was filmed at the Tec-Art Studios in Hollywood.
