= Constance Crawley =

English actress (1870–1919)

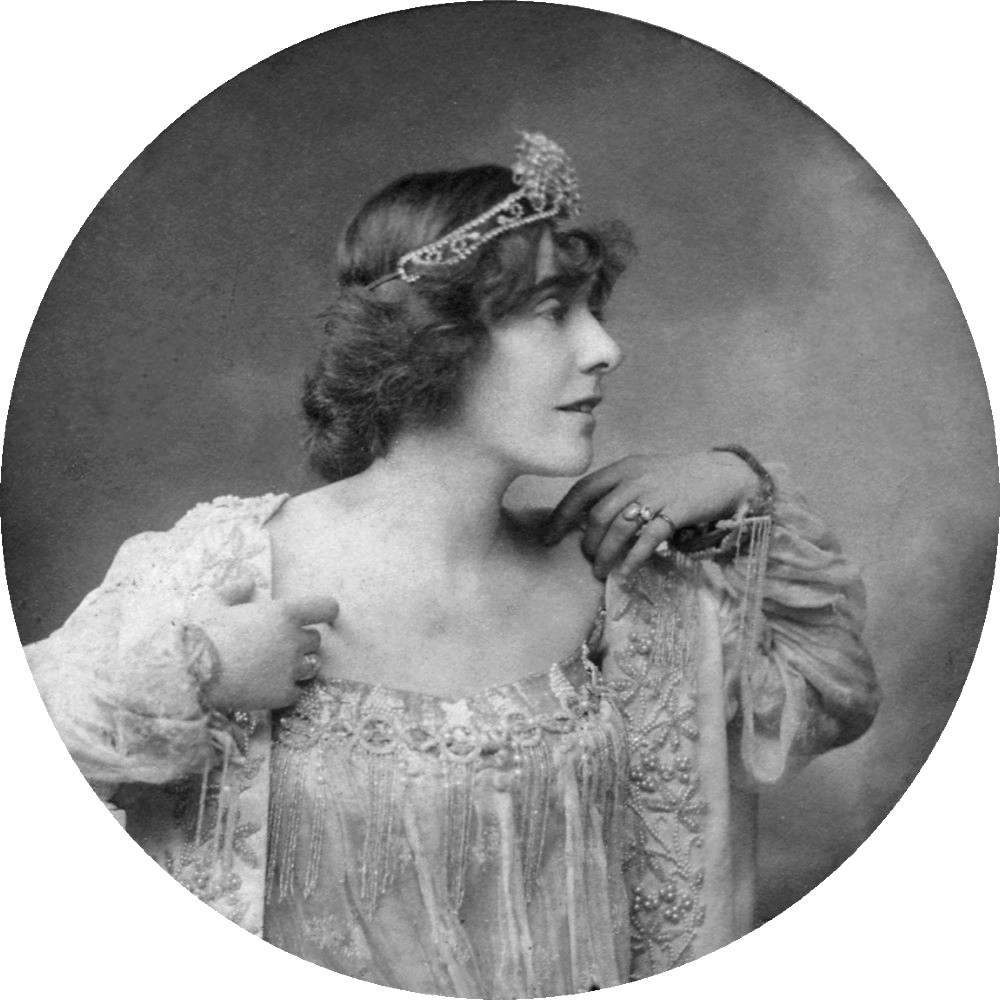
- Crawley, c. 1904, touring with the Ben Greet Players
- Born: Constance Emily Thompson; 30 March 1870; London, England,
- Died: 17 March 1919 (aged 48); Los Angeles, California, U.S.
- Occupation: Actress
- Years active: 1897–1919

Constance Crawley (30 March 1870 – 17 March 1919) was an English actress best known for leading roles in Shakespeare tragedies. She gained notice on the American stage at the start of the 20th century, and later starred in and wrote several silent films.

== Biography ==
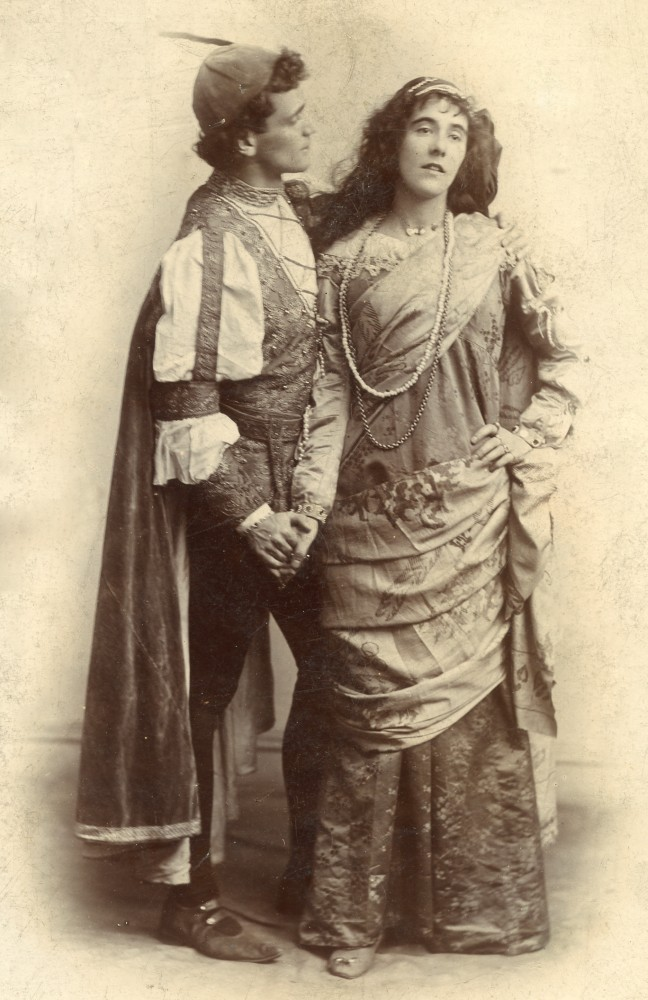
Constance Crawley and husband John Sayer Crawley, c. 1899, in South Africa with Henry Irving's stage company

=== Early life and career ===
Crawley was born Constance Ione "Emily" Thompson in Sunnycroft, Wandsworth, Surrey. She was the daughter of Theophilus Wathen Thompson, a wealthy London solicitor, and his wife Maria Elizabeth Abbott, as well as the granddaughter of Theophilus Thompson, M.D., a Fellow of the Royal Society. She became Constance Crawley in 1892 when she married John Sayer Crawley, an aspiring actor who encouraged her to seek stage roles. This resulted in her discovery in a London salon in 1897 by Sir Herbert Beerbohm Tree, who gave her the part of Faith Ives in the Henry Arthur Jones play The Dancing Girl. Later she and her husband became members of the stage company of Sir Henry Irving that toured South Africa during the Boer Wars. Upon her return to England, she created the role of Roma in a dramatisation of The Eternal City.

Crawley and her husband came with the Ben Greet players in 1902 to the United States, where she was understudy to Greet's leading lady Edith Wynne Matthison. Crawley returned with Greet the following season and gained wide notice playing the female lead in Shakespeare roles opposite Greet, and as the female lead in Greet's Chicago and west coast production of the medieval morality play Everyman, whereas Matthison continued the lead roles in the company's east coast productions. Crawley then returned as the sole female lead on Greet's third tour of the States in 1904, with a young Sybil Thorndike as her understudy.

She returned to the British stage for two years, but was back in the United States in 1906 with her own stage company. Elsa Maxwell, who had joined Crawley's company, writes that they opened their tour of North America in Pasadena on the night of the Great San Francisco earthquake, which levelled every theatre on their California itinerary, after which the tour continued with a succession of performances in Texas, Louisiana, Missouri and New York. Although Crawley's Broadway appearances with her company were few, she had success elsewhere, particularly in the midwest and California. She spent several months recuperating in the resort town of Sierra Madre, California after contracting tuberculosis during a 1912 tour of Canada, and then settled in Los Angeles from 1913 on to focus her career on silent films.

Crawley became closely associated with Arthur Maude, a British actor and director ten years her junior, who in 1906 had become the manager of her stage company. He ultimately took over managing her career as well, and from at least 1914 on they lived together at the same Los Angeles address. The two played opposite each other on stage and then in films, including four movies with their own production company, Crawley-Maude Features. One of their film projects was a 1914 screen adaptation of the Everyman play that had brought Crawley to the attention of U.S. audiences. However, their version of the film came out only a few months after the release of a colour version starring Linda Arvidson, and neither film received much notice. Crawley and Maude also starred in six films with the short-lived American Film Manufacturing Company (Flying "A" Studios) of Santa Barbara, California, which at the time was one of the largest motion picture studios in the United States. Their 1916 film, The Wraith of Haddon Towers, is considered one of the first movies in the then emerging genre of horror films. Crawley's husband remained in New York during these years, where, under the stage name Sayre Crawley, he enjoyed a long career on Broadway. Though they never divorced, the Crawleys remained separated.

=== Later years and death ===
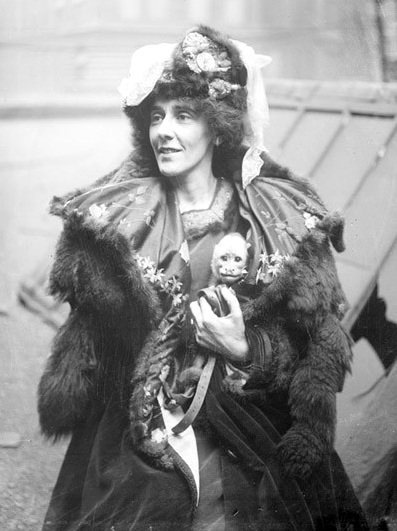
Crawley at a Chicago train station in 1908 with her pet monkey "Dooley".

Crawley's last major stage role was on 19 May 1916 when the Hollywood Businessmen's Club for the 300th anniversary of Shakespeare's death staged an outdoor production of Julius Caesar that was performed by a cast of 5,000 to an audience of 40,000 in the Hollywood Hills. Crawley played the role of Calpurnia opposite Tyrone Power Sr. as Marcus Brutus and Douglas Fairbanks, Sr. as Cato. Her later stage appearances were largely one-woman shows where, as part of the entertainment, members of the audience engaged her in conversation on topics of their choosing, with proceeds from the show going to charity.

Crawley never fully recovered from her 1912 episode with tuberculosis. In declining health, she took on no more film acting roles after the March 1916 release of her film Revelations, but she remained active in the film industry as a scenario writer, and she co-wrote three screenplays with Arthur Maude. Despite being in poor health in her final years, she was still part of the Los Angeles social scene, entertaining artists and entertainers at her home at 1203 Shatto place, which after her death was set aside in her memory as an art center.

She died on 17 March 1919 in Los Angeles, and her estranged husband John Sawyer Crawley handled the final affairs of her estate, even though Arthur Maude had been her companion for the previous six years. Although her age at the time of her death was reported in the newspapers as 39, she was actually a few days shy of 49, having been less than truthful as to her birth date.

=== Personal life ===
Crawley and her husband had one child, a daughter named Vere Crawley, who was born in 1893 in England. Vere later lived near her mother in Los Angeles, before dying of tuberculosis in 1918 aged 25. Crawley's wit and humour made her popular with the press, who interviewed her regularly. She kept one or more monkeys as pets during most of her adult life, and her adventures smuggling them into train stations and hotel rooms in hat boxes made for popular reading in the newspapers.

== Filmography ==
Actress

- The Midianitish Woman (1913)
- Pelleas and Melisande (1913)
- Francesca da Rimini (1913)
- Jephtah's Daughter (1913)
- The Shadow of Nazareth (1913)
- Pagliacci (1913)
- The Florentine Tragedy (1913)
- The Second Mrs. Tanqueray (1914)
- The Volunteer Parson (1914)
- The Bride of Lammermoor (1914)
- Mary Magdalene (1914)
- Jess (1914)
- Elsie Venner (1914)
- Charlotte Corday (1914)
- Everyman (1914)
- The Fatal Night (1914)
- Thais (1914; Crawley also co-directed the film with Arthur Maude)
- The Virgin of the Rocks (1914)
- The Alternative (1915) – also released as The Winning Hand
- The Wraith of Haddon Towers (1916)
- Lord Loveland Discovers America (1916)
- Powder (1916)
- Embers (1916)
- Revelations (1916)

Writer

- The Moving Finger (1916)
- In the Lap of the Gods (1916)
- The Shadows of Suspicion (1916)
- Her Chance (1916)
- The Last of the Morgans (1916)
- Just Her Luck (1916)
- An Old Soldier's Romance (1917)
- A Jewel in Pawn (1917)
- The Rogue's Nest (1917)
- Flames of Treachery (1917)
- Hatton of Headquarters (1917)
