= The Shadow of Nazareth =

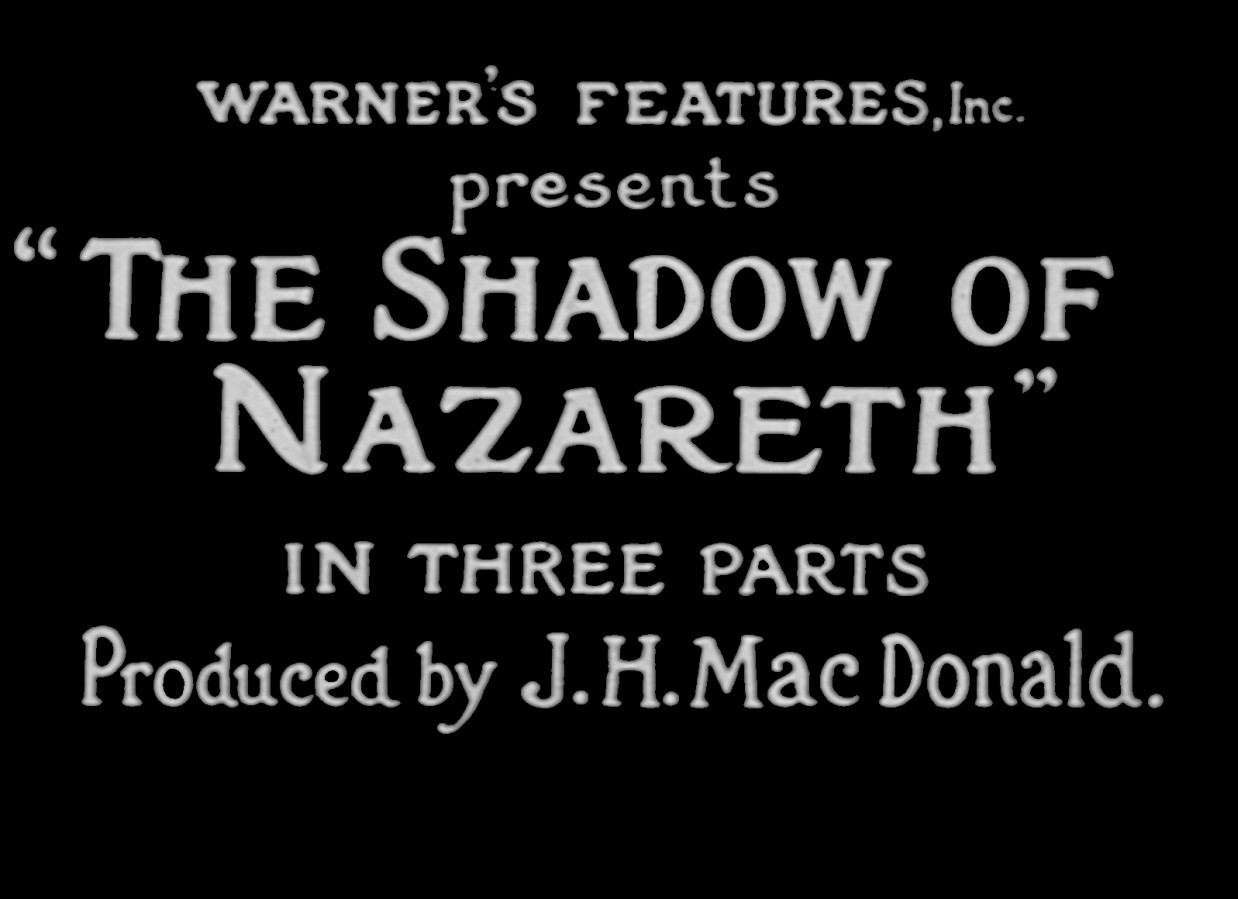
- Directed by: Arthur Maude
- Produced by: J. Farrell MacDonald (and Pat Powers)
- Starring: Arthur Maude; Constance Crawley
- Production company: Venus Features
- Distributed by: Warner Features (USA)
- Release date: November 1913
- Running time: Three reels (about 12 minutes per reel)
- Country: United States
- Languages: Silent; English intertitles

The Shadow of Nazareth is a 1913 silent movie set in Jerusalem at the time of the crucifixion of Jesus. Starring Arthur Maude and Constance Crawley, it depicts the story of a vain woman named Judith, her brother Judas Iscariot, and her two admirers: Barabbas, who is a thief, and Caiaphas, the high priest of Jerusalem.

== Plot ==
The story opens with Barabbas (Arthur Maude) stealing a headdress of precious stones to impress Judith (Constance Crawley), but her love is actually for Caiaphas (Joe Harris), the high priest of the city, who is devising a plot to kill Jesus Christ. When Barabbas stabs an associate of Caiaphas during an argument over Judith, Caiaphas has Barabbas arrested by Roman soldiers. Then as Barabbas is led away, Caiaphas kills the injured man to prevent him from revealing the plot, and Barrabas is blamed for the crime. Sometime later, Judith at the urging of Caiaphas convinces Judas Iscariot, who is her brother, to betray Jesus, which allows Caiaphas to have Jesus arrested. Barrabas in the meantime has been freed, but is arrested a second time when he makes an attempt on the life of Caiaphas, and Barrabas ends up being held in the same prison as Jesus.

Both Barrabas and Jesus are sentenced to die by crucifixion, but Jewish custom allows the release of a prisoner on the day of the Passover feast. Pontius Pilate, the Prefect of the Roman province of Judaea, has the authority to decide whether to free Barabbas or Jesus in honor of the Passover. However, Pilate is unwilling to make the decision himself, so he lets a crowd that has gathered before him choose who is to live. The crowd chooses Barabbas, who is set free, and Jesus, who is innocent of any wrongdoing, dies on the cross. Following the crucifixion, Judas in remorse hangs himself, and Judith, driven mad by the death of her brother, stabs Caiaphas, and then commits suicide.

== Production and distribution ==
As with many silent films of the day, The Shadow of Nazareth resulted from co-operation of several companies. Filming took place at the Hollywood studio of Venus Features with J. Farrell MacDonald as director, and despite the fact that MacDonald is listed in the opening credits as producer, financing for the project actually came from Powers Photo Plays, Inc., a New York concern owned by Pat Powers, the treasurer of Universal Pictures. Despite this connection, Warner Features (the Warner Brothers' predecessor), not Universal, had distribution rights. Warner billed the feature, which was shown in three parts (about 35 minutes total running time), as a "big biblical production", a successful marketing strategy as the film is said to have been very popular in the "bible belt" of the south.

== Cast ==
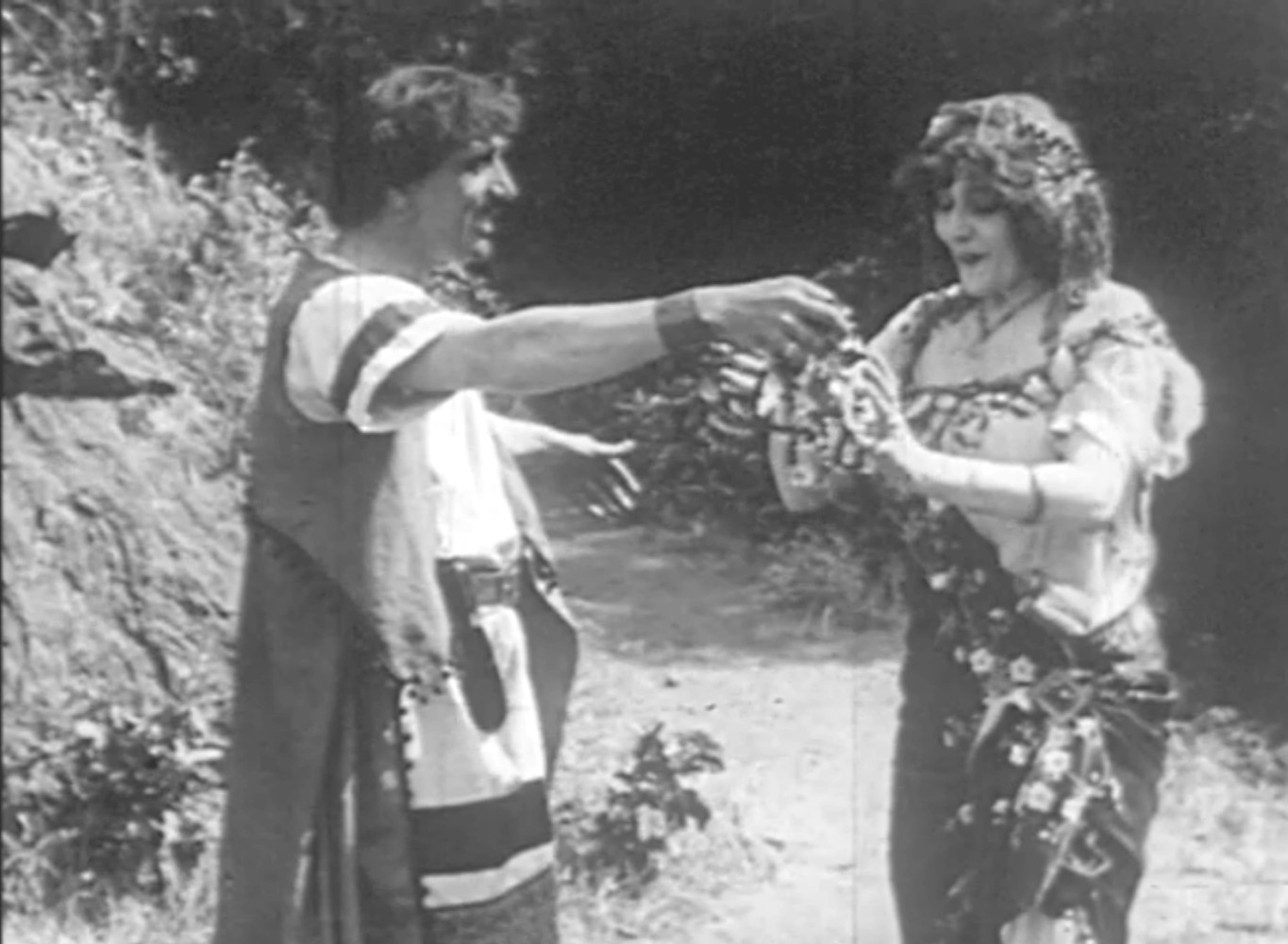
Barrabas gives Judith a gift in a scene from The Shadow of Nazareth.

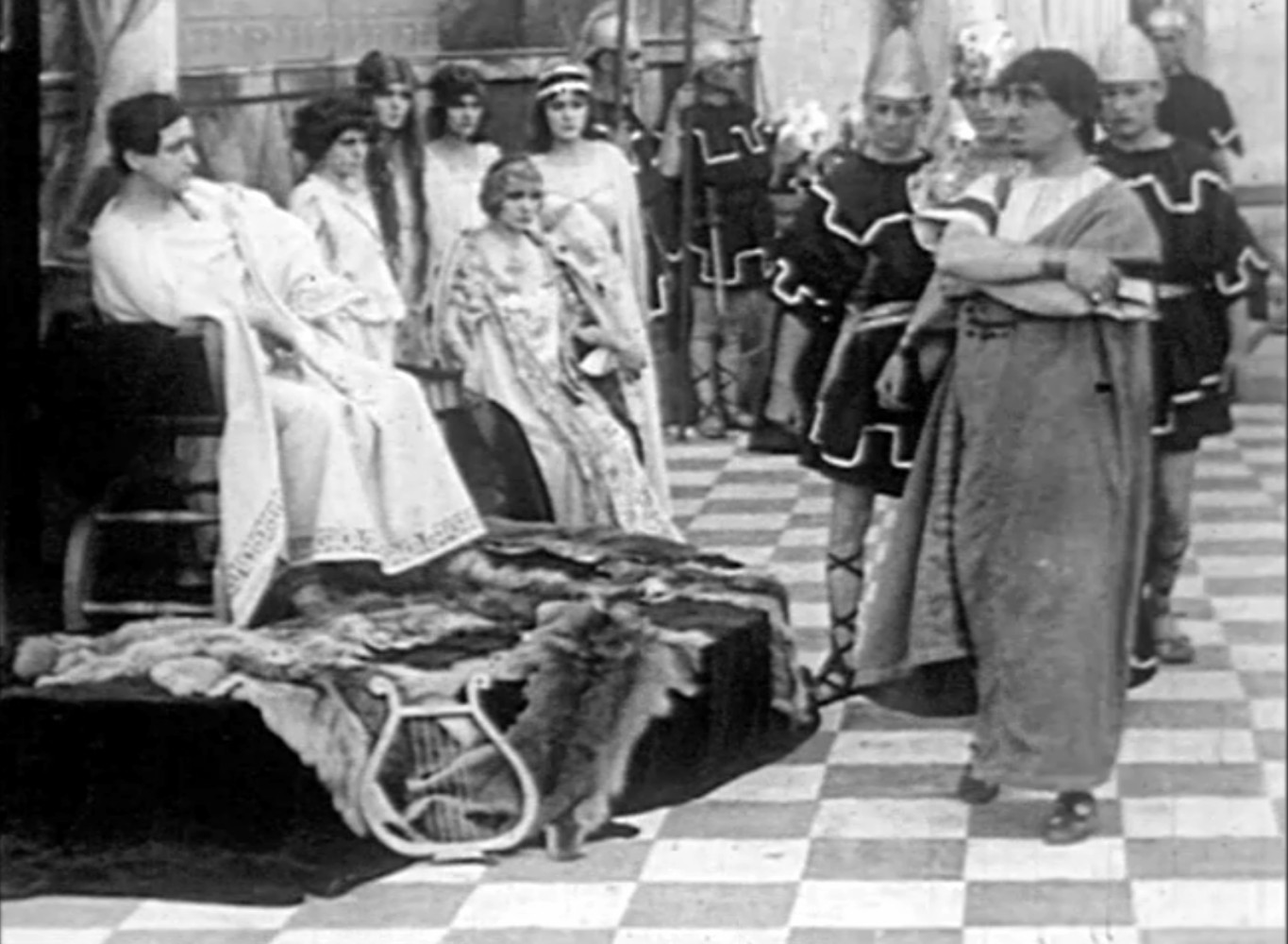
Barrabas stands before Pontius Pilate in another scene

- Constance Crawley as Judith
- Arthur Maude as Barabbas
- Joe Harris as Caiaphas
