= The Microbe =

1919 silent film directed by Henry Otto

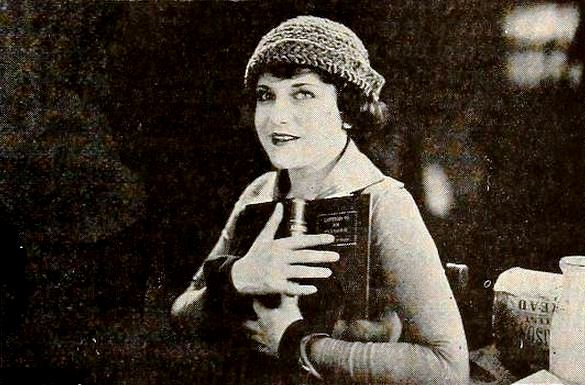
- Viola Dana in the film
- Directed by: Henry Otto
- Written by: June Mathis (Scenario)
- Based on: the short story, "The Microbe" by Henry Altimus
- Produced by: Maxwell Karger
- Starring: Viola Dana; Kenneth Harlan; Arthur Maude
- Cinematography: John Arnold
- Production company: Metro Pictures
- Release date: July 21, 1919 (US)
- Running time: 5 reels
- Country: United States
- Language: English

The Microbe is a 1919 American silent comedy-drama film, directed by Henry Otto. It stars Viola Dana, Kenneth Harlan, and Arthur Maude, and was released on July 21, 1919.

== Cast list ==
- Viola Dana as Happy O'Brien, aka "The Microbe"
- Kenneth Harlan as DeWitt Spense
- Arthur Maude as Robert Breton
- Bonnie Hill as Judith Winthrope
- Ned Norworth as Norman Slade
- Lucy Donahue as Mrs. Risden
