= Mary Magdalene (1914 film) =

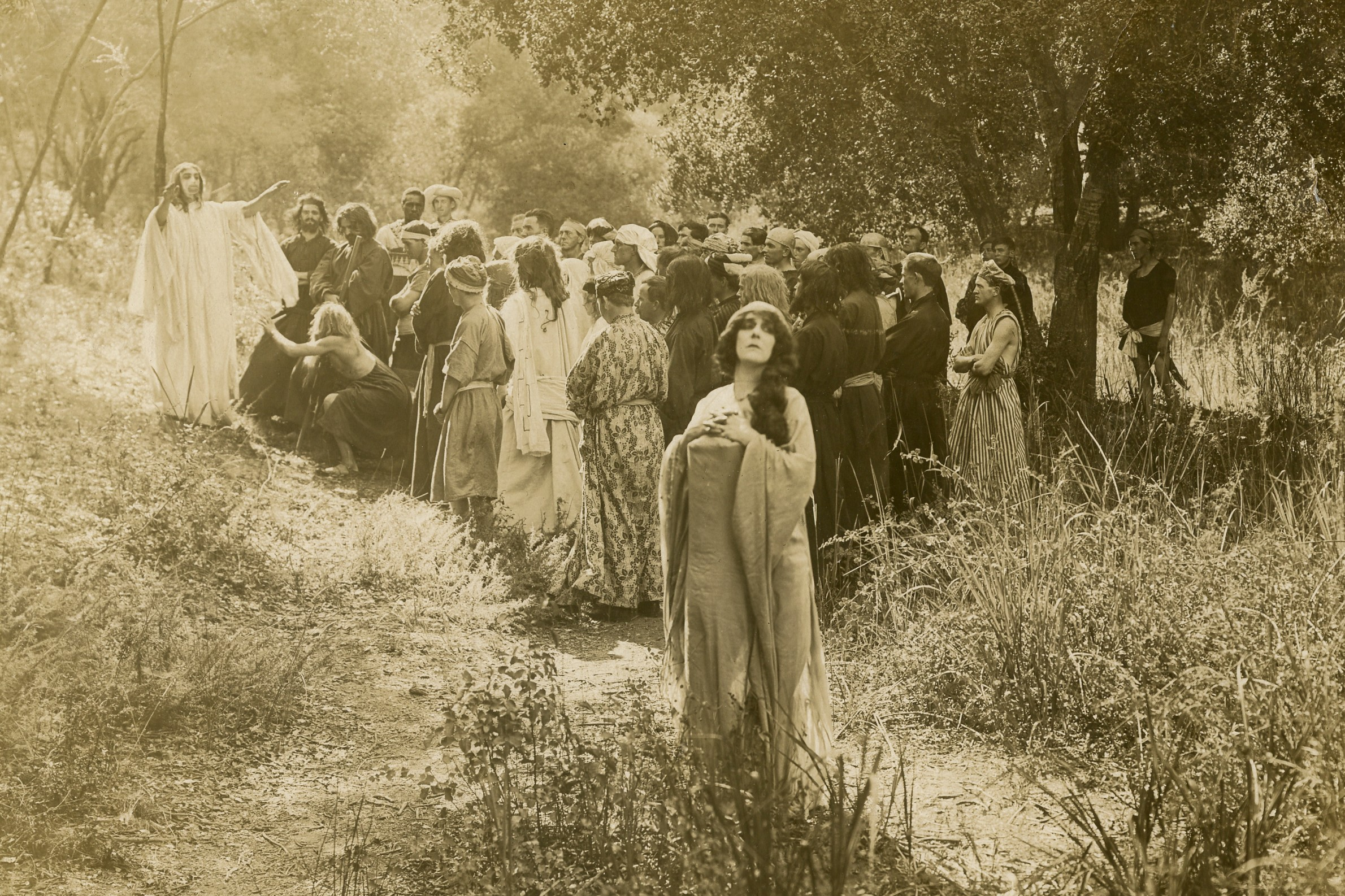
- Crawley (center) as Mary
- Directed by: Arthur Maude
- Starring: Arthur Maude; Constance Crawley
- Production company: Kennedy Features
- Distributed by: Warner Features (USA)
- Release date: February 4, 1914
- Running time: Three reels (about 12 minutes per reel)
- Country: United States
- Languages: Silent; English intertitles

Mary Magdalene is a 1914 silent film that costars Arthur Maude and Constance Crawley and is loosely based on the 1910 play of the same name by Belgian playwright Maurice Maeterlinck.

== Plot ==
The story takes place in Capernaum and Jerusalem during the two years leading up to the crucifixion of Jesus Christ, and follows the lives of Judas Iscariot (Arthur Maude) and Mary Magdalene (Constance Crawley), who indulge in their own selfish pursuits and care little about the plights of others. But when Mary hears Jesus preach an outdoor sermon, she learns the power of Christ's love and abandons her reckless ways to become one of his most ardent followers.

== Production ==
Charles Urban, the Anglo-British promoter of the Kinemacolor process of making color motion pictures, acquired worldwide rights to Maurice Maeterlinck's play Mary Magdalene with plans to produce a color film. Maeterlinck's mistress Georgette Leblanc, who had appeared in the title role of the original production of play, was retained to star in the movie. Although Urban planned an Autumn 1913 release in London, and actual filming did take place in Europe, a final product never reached the screen. Instead, Aubrey Kennedy of Kennedy Features in Los Angeles, California, released his own version of Mary Magdalene in February 1914 that was filmed at cameraman James Crosby's J.A.C. Studio near downtown Los Angeles.

Kennedy Features sought investors (state-right buyers) for the film by advertising that Mary Magdalene was "a stupendous production that will create a sensation wherever shown." One theater ad that appeared after the 4 February 1914 release of the film even billed it as "the most magnificent melodramatic feature America has ever seen." Although reviews of the film were generally positive, and it was still being shown in theaters as late as November 1915, little mention of Mary Magdalene appears in motion picture trade journals such as The Moving Picture World and Motography in the months after the film was released.

== Cast ==
- Constance Crawley as Mary Magdalene
- Arthur Maude as Canis Proculas
- William Nigh as Syrius Superbus
- Joe Harris as Judas Iscariot
- Jefferson Osborne
