= Arthur Maude =

English actor, screenwriter and director (1880–1950)

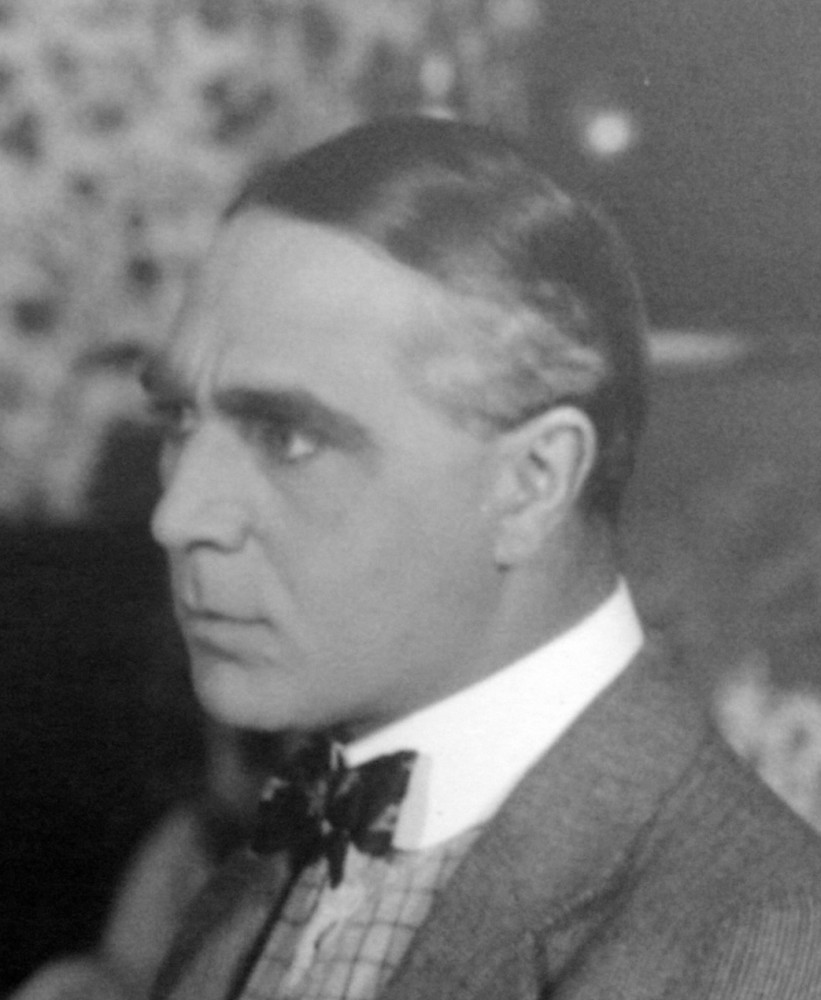
- On set at Flying "A" Studios, 1916
- Born: 23 July 1880; Pontefract, West Yorkshire
- Died: 9 January 1950 (aged 69); Paddington, London
- Occupation: Actor
- Years active: 1900–1950

Arthur John Maude (23 July 1880 – 9 January 1950) was an English actor, screenwriter, and film director.

== Biography ==
Maude was born Arthur John Maud on 23 July 1880 in Pontefract, West Riding, Yorkshire, to William Robert Maud (1849–1919) and his wife Lucy Monkman (1853–1929). He would make the claim in later years that he was also the nephew of British general Sir Frederick Stanley Maude, the World War I hero of the Mesopotamia campaign, but this is not supported by British census returns and vital records.

Maude began his career as a stage actor. He played for six years with John Martin Harvey's stage company and then became the manager and leading man in Constance Crawley's company in America, including the male lead in the 1910 Broadway production of Mr. and Mrs. Daventry. He and Crawley, who was separated from her husband, began living together, and he took over managing her career. The two continued to play opposite each other in, and to co-write, films during World War I, including six with the short-lived American Film Manufacturing Company (Flying "A" Studios) of Santa Barbara, California, which at the time was one of the largest motion picture studios in the United States.

After Crawley's death in 1919, Maude continued to act, write screenplays and direct films. He is probably best known for his role as Dr. Gilbert Trent in the 1922 Harry Houdini film The Man from Beyond, which was his last major acting role in a film. However, Maude continued to direct, and he acted in bit parts as well. His last major film project in the United States was the 1927, patriotic-themed silent movie The Flag: A Story Inspired by the Tradition of Betsy Ross, for which he was both writer and director. Although the film was short, a two-reeler that ran about 20 minutes, it was produced in colour using the Technicolor process.

Sometime between 1927 and 1928 Maude returned to Britain after living for more than 25 years in the United States. He continued to direct films, including the 1929 drama The Clue of the New Pin, which was filmed using Phonofilm and is usually considered the first feature-length "talking picture" released in Britain. Although he had lived from 1913 to 1919 with Constance Crawley, there is no evidence that Maude ever married, nor became involved with another woman. He did continue to stay involved in the film industry and died of a heart attack at the age of 69 on 9 January 1950 in Paddington, London, more than a year before the release of his final film, a short titled One Good Turn (1951).

== Selected filmography ==
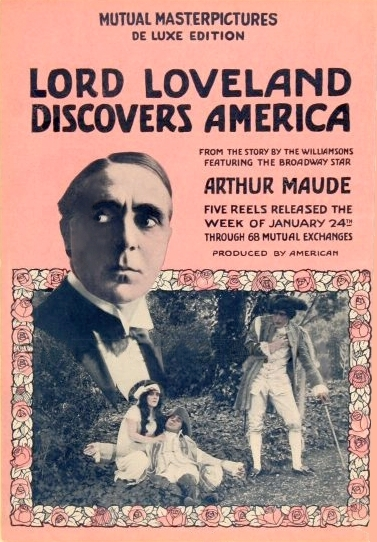
Poster from 1916 silent film starring Arthur Maude

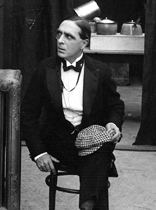
Maude in Lord Loveland Discovers America (1916)

=== Actor ===
- The Shadow of Nazareth (1913)
- Mary Magdalene, (1914)
- The Old Fisherman's Story (1914)
- The Devil (1915)
- The Reward (1915)
- The Wraith of Haddon Towers (1916)
- Lord Loveland Discovers America (1916)
- Embers (1916)
- Borrowed Plumage (1917)
- Common Property (1919)
- The Microbe (1919)
- The Thirteenth Commandment (1920)
- The Man from Beyond (1922)
- Call Me Mame (1933)
- Head of the Family (1933)
- Sabotage at Sea (1942)

=== Director ===
- The Flag: A Story Inspired by the Tradition of Betsy Ross (1927)
- Toni (1928)
- The Ringer (1928)
- The Clue of the New Pin (1929)
- The Flying Squad (1929)
- The Lyons Mail (1931)
- Watch Beverly (1932)
- She Was Only a Village Maiden (1933)
- The Wishbone (1933)
- The Lure (1933) from the play The Lure, by J. W. Sabben-Clare
- Borrowed Clothes (1934)
- Boomerang (1934)
- I Live Again (1936)
- One Good Turn (1951; Maude was also producer)
