= Ben Greet =

English actor-manager (1857–1936)

Sir Ben Greet
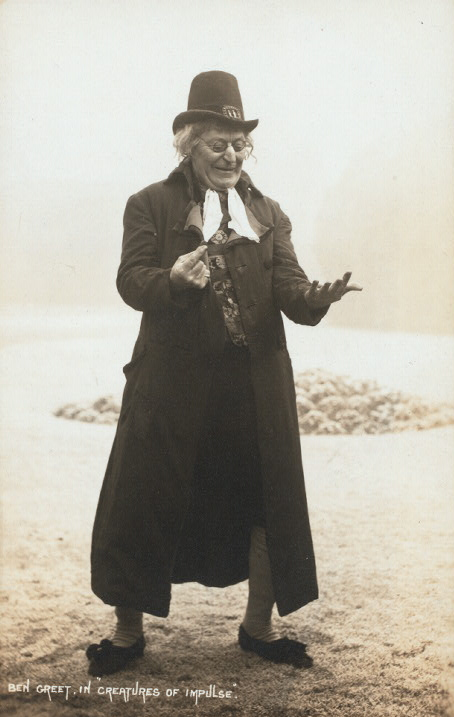
- Ben Greet as "Boomblehart", from W. S. Gilbert's Creatures of Impulse, circa 1910
- Born: Philip Barling Greet; 24 September 1857; London, England
- Died: 17 May 1936 (aged 78); London, England
- Occupation: Actor-manager
- Years active: 1883–1936
- Relatives: William Greet (brother)

Sir Philip Barling Greet (24 September 1857 – 17 May 1936), known professionally as Ben Greet, was a British Shakespearean actor, director, impresario and actor-manager.

== Early life ==
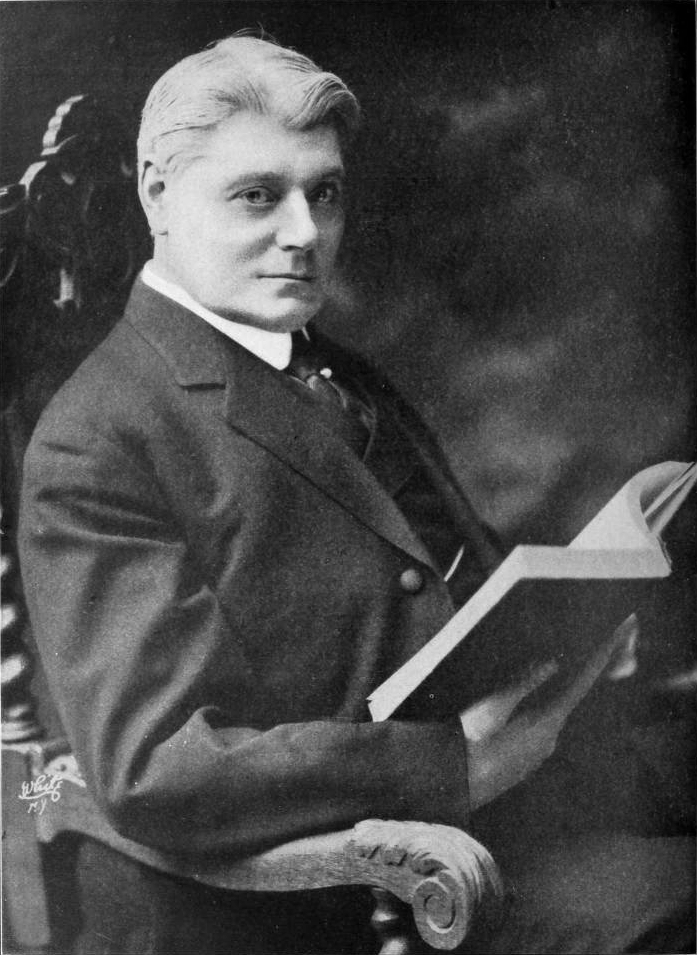

The younger son of Captain William Greet RN and his wife, Sarah Barling, Greet was born on board HMS Crocodile, a Royal Navy recruiting ship tied up at the Tower of London. He was the youngest of five sisters and two brothers. He was educated at the Royal Naval School, New Cross. His parents planned to for him to be a naval officer or a clergyman, but instead he became a schoolmaster at a private school at Worthing. His brother, William Greet, was a theatre manager while his other brother Thomas was the only sibling to go on to have a career in the Royal Navy.

Ben Greet would visit the Greenwich and Woolwich theatres frequently to watch the exciting productions of Victorian melodrama, Shakespearean plays, farces and pantomimes. Some of the productions he might have seen as a young child were Light in the Dark, Mariner's Compass and Shakespeare's Othello around the year 1867. Greet was exposed to many dramas as a child, and he performed in plays at school. According to Isaac, Greet would "have tested his histrionic powers, giving his family and friends a taste of his quality, interpreting [characters] of Shakespeare's plays…". Yet, Greet did not perform on the professional stage until four years after his father's death in 1879.

== Acting career ==
Greet performed in his first appearance as a professional actor in J. W. Gordon's Stock Company at the Theatre Royal in Southampton. He performed in an Irish melodrama and within the next day, he was assigned to play over twenty Shakespearean parts for an additional season. Then, for the next three years, Greet performed at the Theatre Royal in Margate where he was given the opportunity to work with the best artists of that time. After his three years performing in Margate, he went back to London to join Miss Wallis's Company at The Gaiety Theatre where they performed Cymbeline. Ben Greet played, as 'Caius Lucius' in the show, and it was this role that claimed to be Greet's first real debut in 1883. Later that year, Greet became a member of Minnie Palmer's Company at the Grand Theatre in Islington, where he played 'Dudley Harcourt' in My Sweetheart. His first major breakthrough role was the 'Apothecary' in Mary Anderson's production of Romeo and Juliet at the Lyceum Theatre, which opened in 1884. The play ran for over one hundred nights, and the production was remembered as one of the most stunning performances of that time. From 1884 to 1897, Greet played numerous roles with many different companies and theatres. In just five years, he performed more than 300 theatrical roles.

== Actor-manager career ==
In 1883 Greet launched his career by first creating The Ben Greet Players, his own company. They performed open-air productions of the classic English stage repertory. They first produced tours throughout England, performing in college gardens, the parks of great houses, and village greens. Their popularity increased, and after twenty years of touring with outdoor productions of Shakespeare in England, Greet and his troupe toured in America.

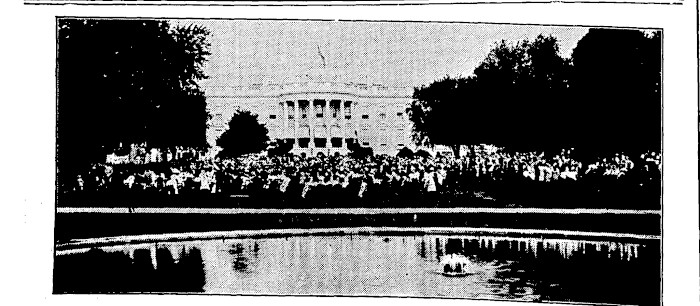
The Ben Greet Players at the White House (1911)

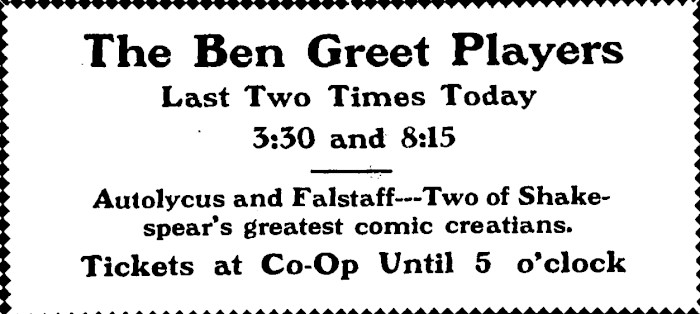
Advertisement in the Daily Illini for the Ben Greet Players

In May 1914, the "Ben Greet Players" presented two Shakespearean plays on the campus of the College of Industrial Arts, a women's college in Denton, Texas. According to a letter dated 5 May 1914 by a student at the college, "...one of them will be given in the afternoon and the other at night. The "Ben Greet Players" is a traveling company that goes to the various colleges and universities of the country to play."

Greet's alfresco productions were the first tours organized to bring professional actors to college campuses in America. The American tour was even rewarding enough for The Ben Greet Players to perform for President Roosevelt on the White House front lawn.

Greet returned to England in 1903 for a short time and managed more tours before beginning another American tour in 1904. They performed plays such as Everyman, Twelfth Night, The Merchant of Venice and The Star of Bethlehem in locations including Boston and New York. By 1914, the year that Greet returned to England, before the First World War, Greet started to manage The Old Vic theatre.

== Directing career ==
In his four seasons at the Old Vic, Greet produced and directed 35 plays, including 23 by Shakespeare, and Goldsmith's She Stoops to Conquer, Sheridan's The Rivals and The School for Scandal, the Medieval mystery play The Star of Bethlehem, and Everyman among other works. During this period, he also focused on changing the perspectives of children on their views of Shakespeare; at that time, there were over 400 schools that worked in connection with the theatre. The Education Committee of Britain, in 1929, declared that theatre facilities should be renewed to allow children to experience Shakespeare performances "as a reinforcement of the school curriculum and a stimulus to literary appreciation". Over 20,000 primary school students, along with their teachers, were given the chance to see one Shakespeare show during their school term. Greet was thus able to share Shakespeare's works with over a million children. The programme continued for many years as many Education Committees in London sponsored it. Greet was knighted in 1929 by King George V for his works involving the Old Vic theatre and his overall devotion to Shakespeare.

He is commemorated by a blue plaque on the façade of 160 Lambeth Road, London, where he lived from 1920 until his death in 1936.

== Selected filmography ==
- Victory and Peace (1918)
