= American Film Manufacturing Company =

American production company

American Film Company
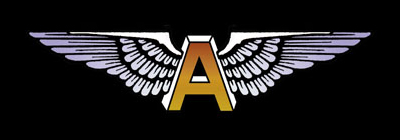
- The Flying A logo
- Formerly: American Film Manufacturing Company
- Industry: Motion picture
- Founded: 1910
- Founders: Harry Aitken; John Freuler; Charles J. Hite; Samuel S. Hutchinson
- Defunct: 1921
- Headquarters: Santa Barbara, California, US

The American Film Manufacturing Company, also known as Flying "A" Studios, was an American motion picture production company. In 1915, the formal name was changed to the American Film Company.

== History ==
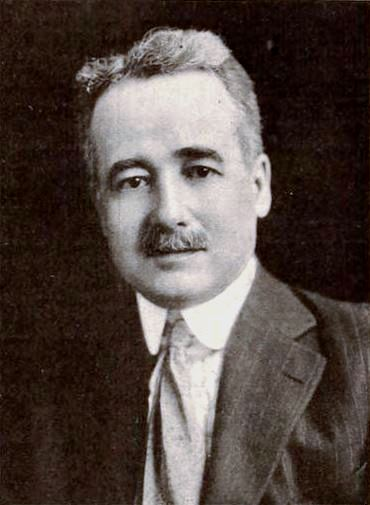
Samuel S. Hutchinson, president of the American Film Manufacturing Company

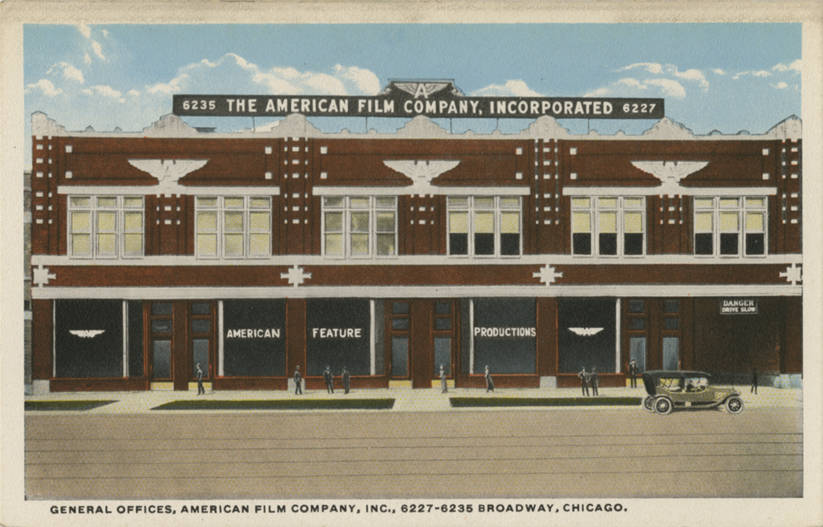
Postcard illustration of the company's building in Chicago

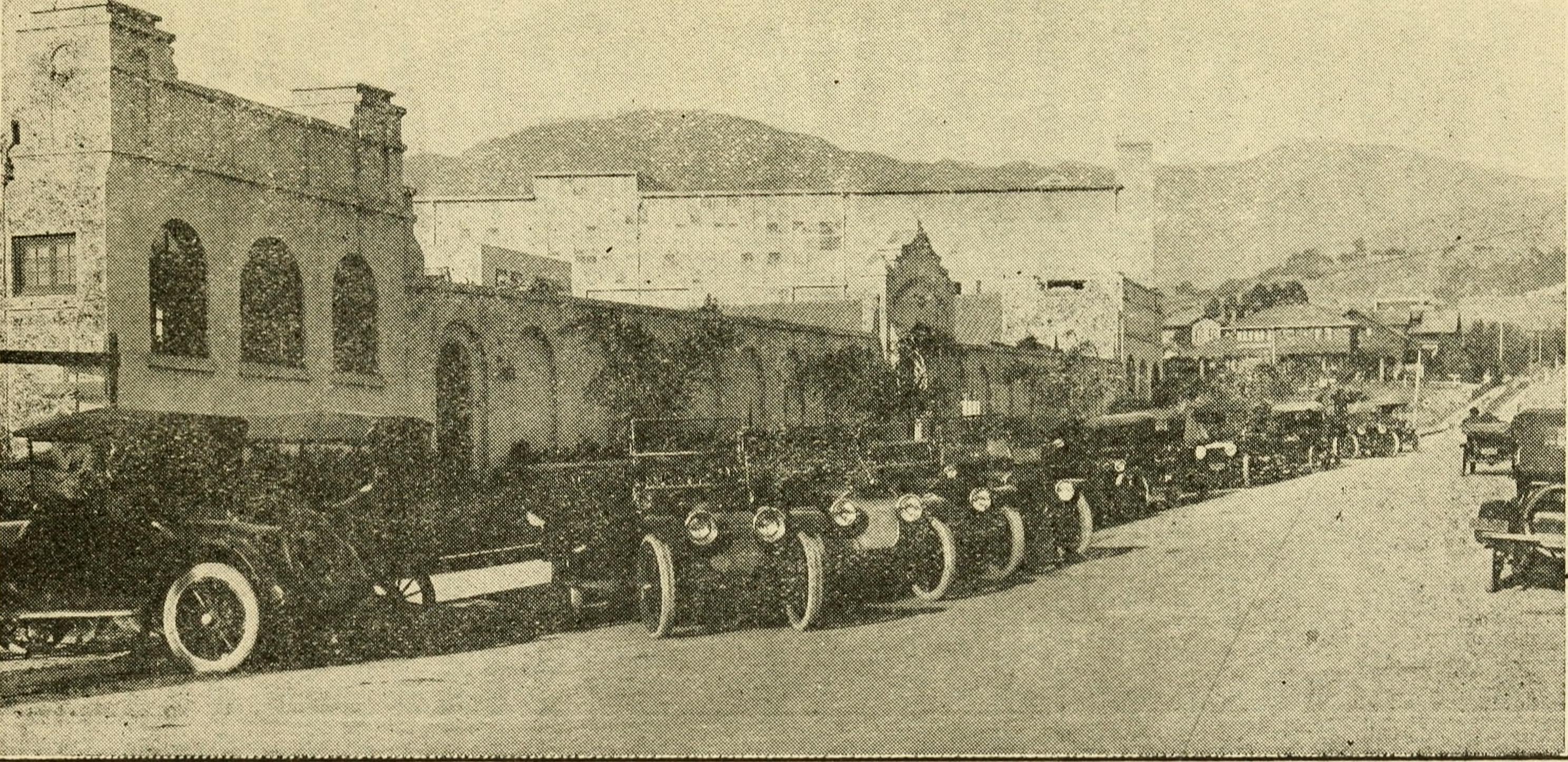
American Film Company plant in Santa Barbara, California

The American Film Manufacturing Company was founded in Chicago in the fall of 1910 by Samuel S. Hutchinson, John R. Freuler, Charles J. Hite and Harry Aitken, four Midwestern businessmen who joined forces and capital to create the company.

Three shooting companies were created. Two would work at the studio or surrounding locales of Chicago, while a third unit was sent out to concentrate on westerns. This western unit would move through the southwest with stops in New Mexico, Arizona and finally California. California was chosen as the unit's final destination for its sunny weather, and to avoid the constraints of the "Edison Trust" (i.e., The Motion Picture Patents Company or MPPC) operating in Chicago and New York.

The third unit eventually settled in the town of La Mesa, twelve miles inland from San Diego, from August 12, 1911, to July 6, 1912, using filming locations there, Lakeside, and sites around San Diego itself.

Under the leadership of Allan Dwan, Flying "A" made over 150 films in San Diego County. The films were usually western adventures, comedies or an occasional local documentary. The Flying A westerns were popular with the public and kept Dwan and his crew extremely busy. The Dwan westerns gave the Flying A the ability to mount large advertising campaigns, create additional films, and become a player in the motion picture industry. While mostly filming in the back country near La Mesa, some sets were built behind the Flying A production buildings. Dwan would occasionally film a cowboy chase scene and then build a plot around that chase.

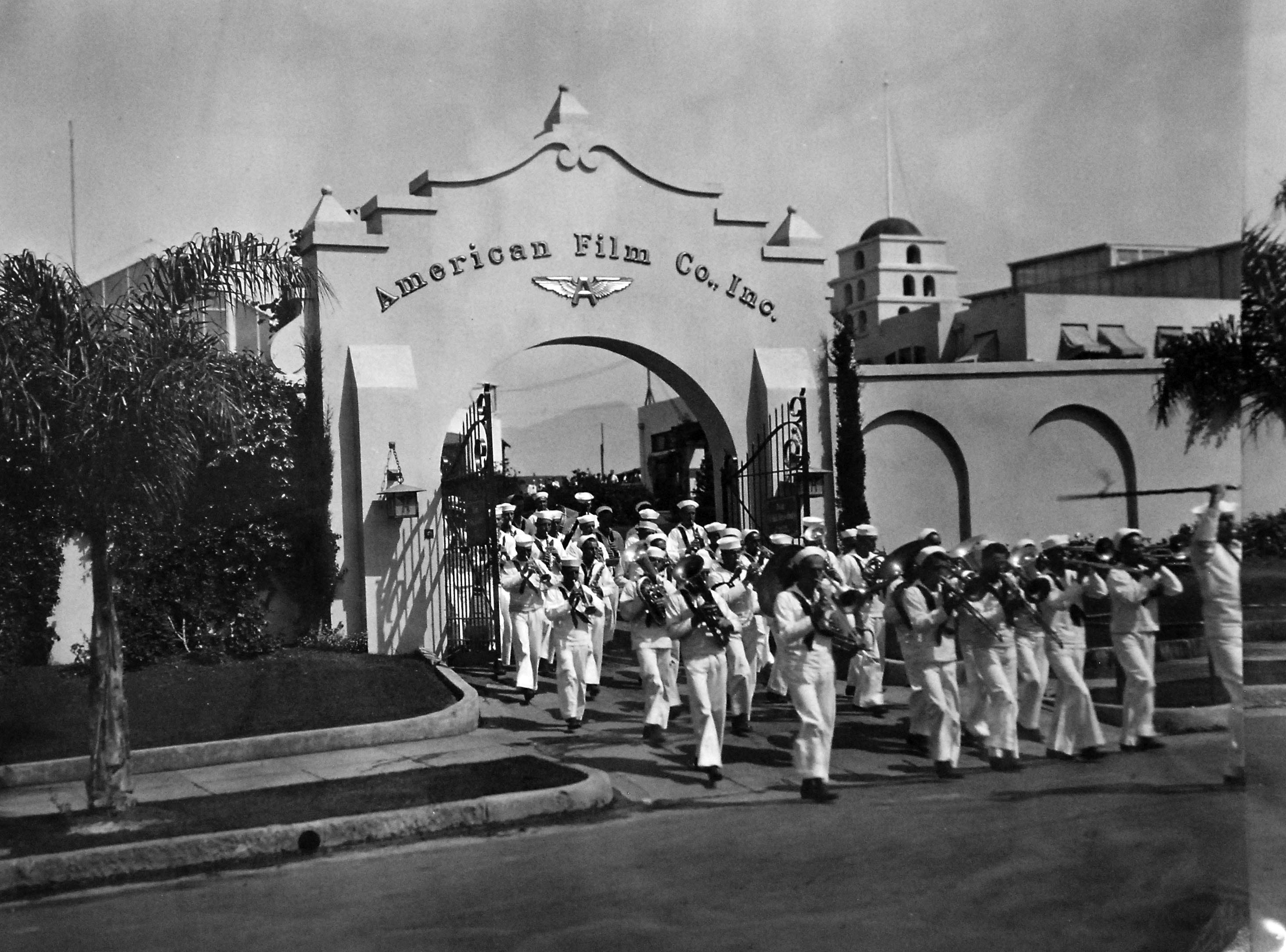
The Navy Recruiting Band at the entrance to the American Film Company in Santa Barbara, California, June 1919

American formally closed the La Mesa studio in July 1912 and moved north to Santa Barbara, beginning production there in August. The main reason for choosing Santa Barbara over La Mesa was that the American Film Company wanted to have easier access to urban locations; at the same time, the Chicago studio was closed (though the company's administrative offices remained there) and the Santa Barbara facility became American's main plant. During its principal operation between 1912 and 1917, Flying "A" Studios was one of the largest motion picture studios in the United States, which made Santa Barbara a California filmmaking center rivaled only by Hollywood.

== Contract players and directors ==
When the American Film Company was formed in 1910, it culled many performers, directors, scenario writers and crew members from Essanay Studios, which was an affiliate of the Motion Picture Patents Company. Among the directors and writers that worked for American were Frank Beal, John Francis Dillon, Allan Dwan, B. Reeves Eason, Lorimer Johnston, Arthur Maude, Harry A. Pollard, Tom Ricketts, Edward Sloman, and William Desmond Taylor. In 1913, Wallace Reid directed several society dramas for the company.

The company's roster of actors included May Allison, Constance Crawley, Dot Farley, Margarita Fischer, Neva Gerber, Winifred Greenwood, Mary Miles Minter, Vivian Rich, Art Acord, Richard Bennett, Frank Borzage (who also directed for American, including films starring himself), J. Warren Kerrigan, Harold Lockwood, George Periolat, William Russell, and William Stowell.

== Demise ==
In mid-1918, American Film Company lost its primary distributor when Mutual Film folded. The company signed with a new distributor, Pathé, and continued to produce features. Over the next three years, the company's output decreased significantly. In 1921, one of American's most prominent contract players, Margarita Fischer, left the company. American Film Company was dissolved shortly thereafter.

The "Flying A Pictures" name would later be used for actor Gene Autry's production company.

== Gallery ==
1916 advertisements

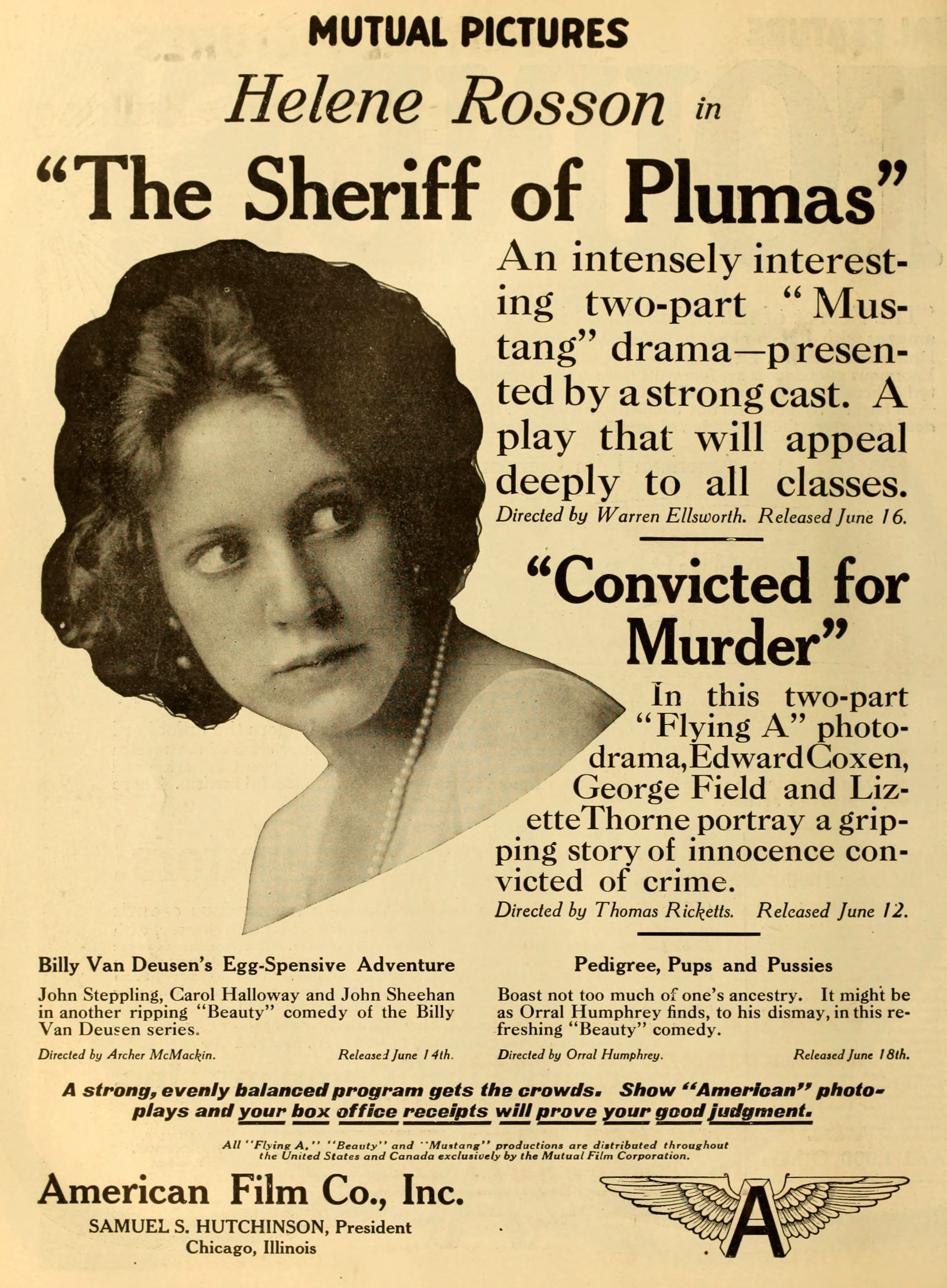

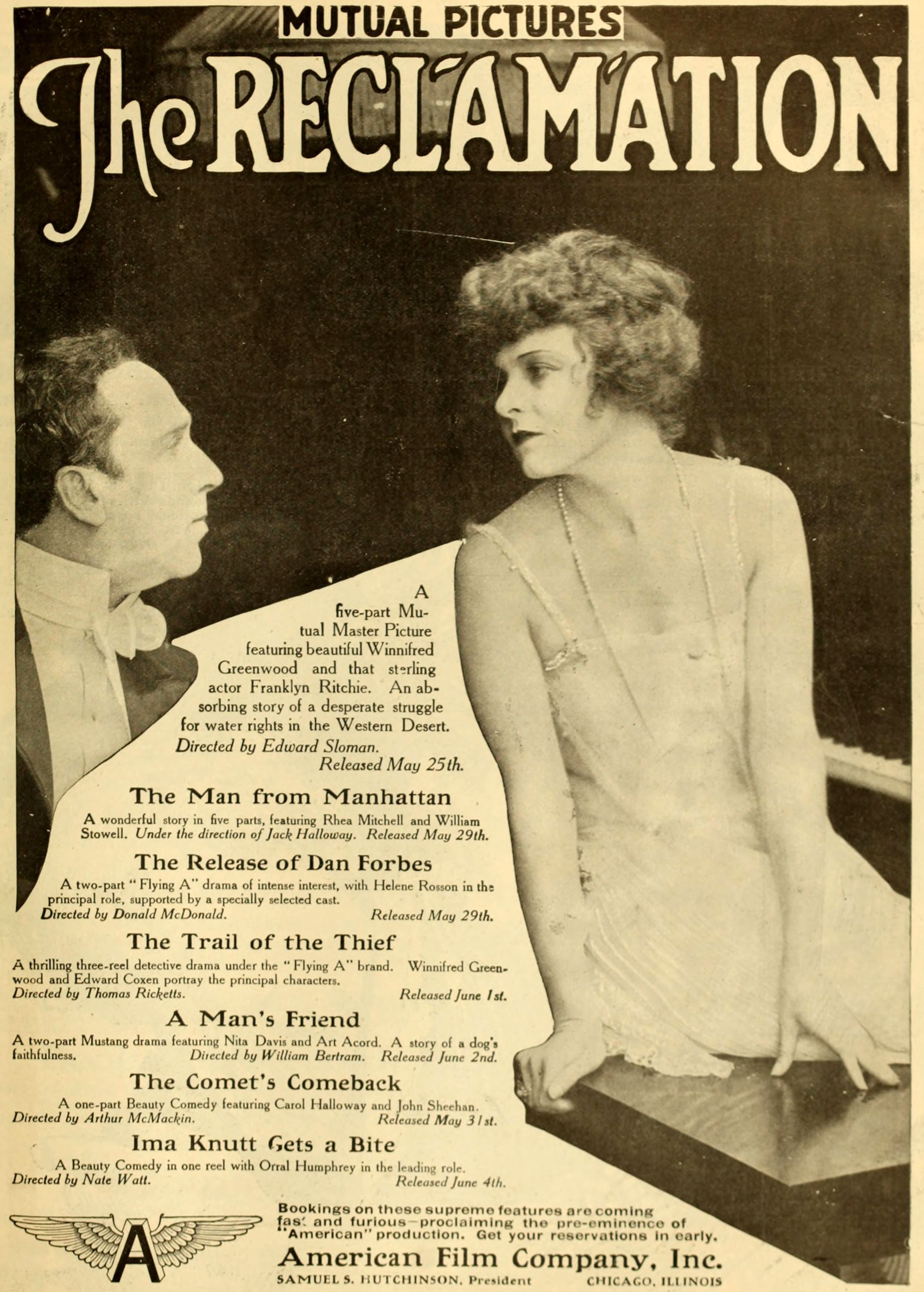

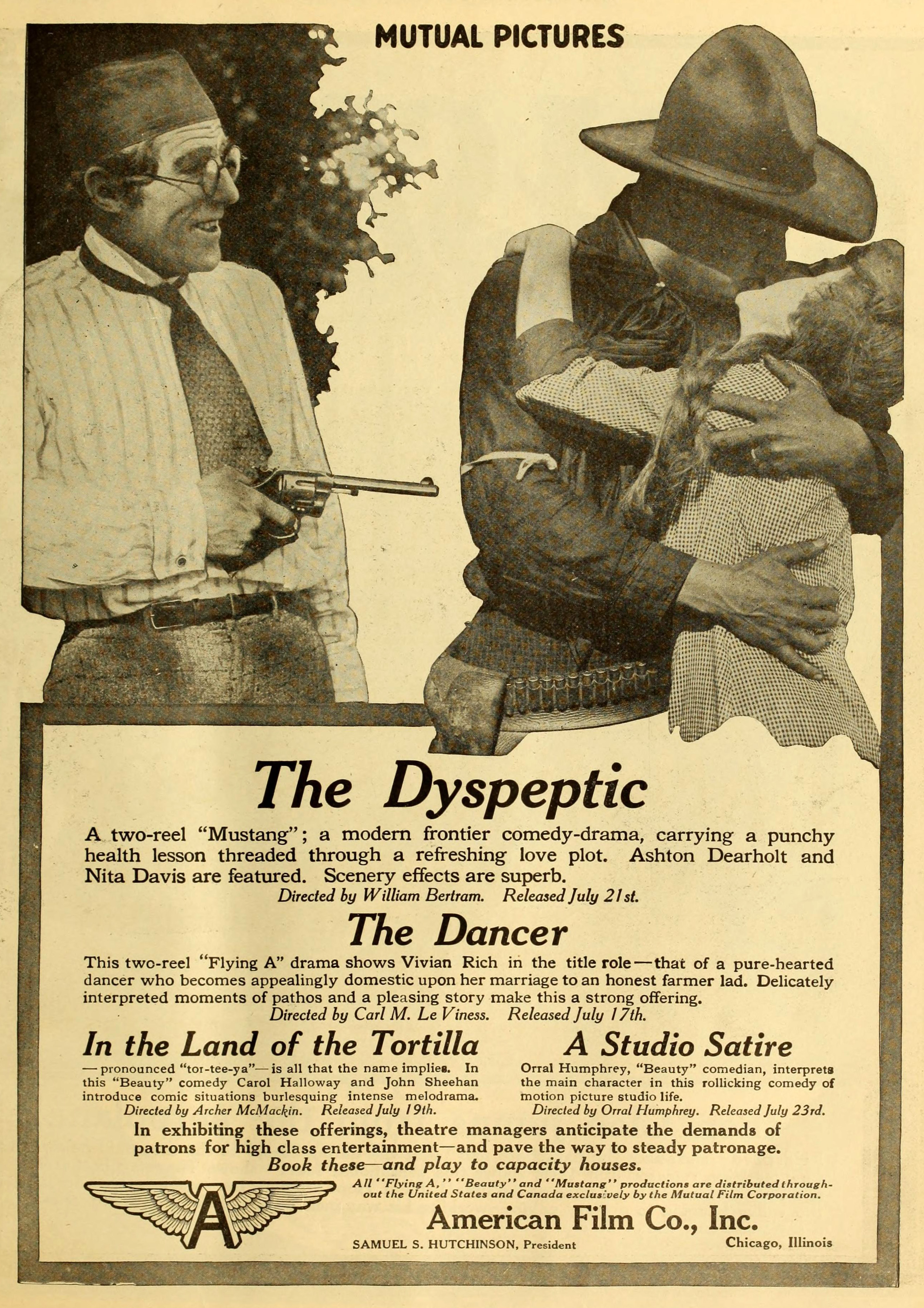

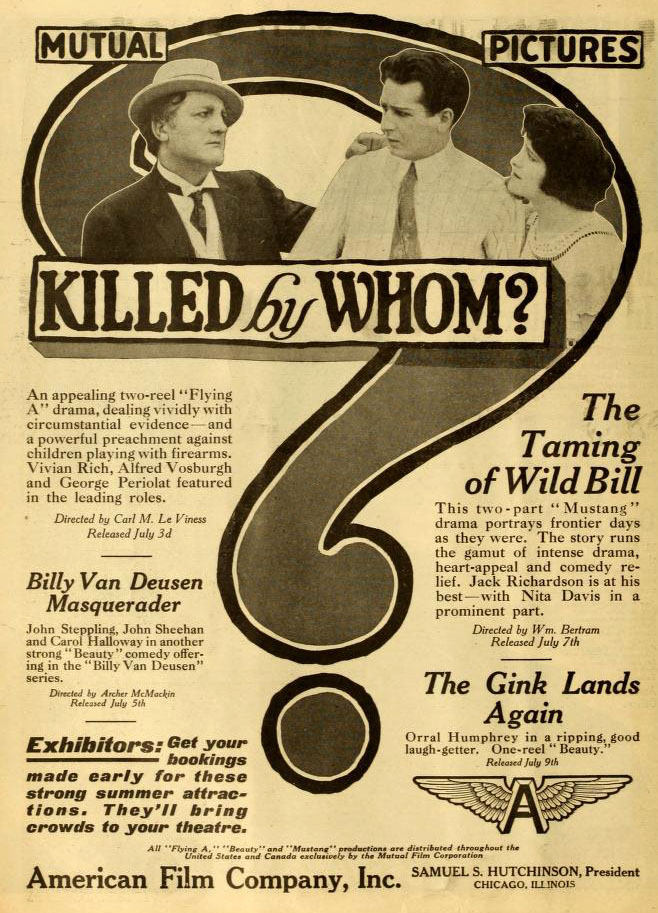

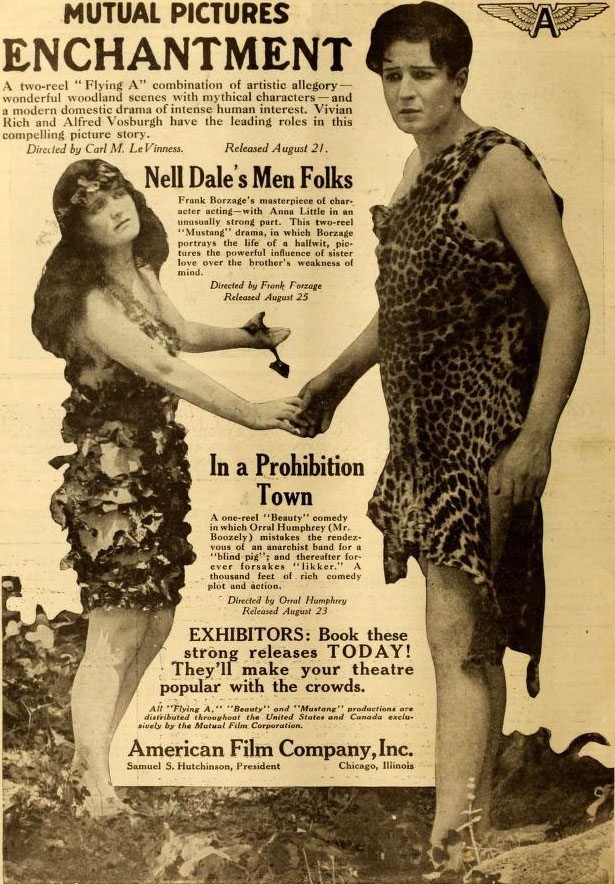

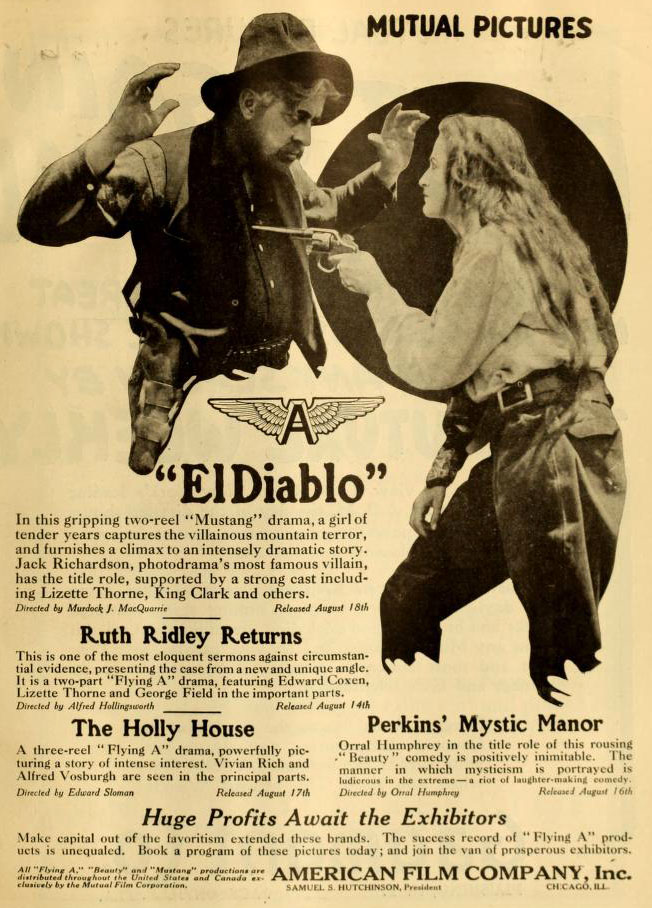

== Bibliography ==
- Birchard, Robert S. Silent-era filmmaking in Santa Barbara, Charleston, SC: Arcadia, c2007. ISBN 0-7385-4730-1.
- Lawton, Stephen (1997). Santa Barbara's Flying A studio. Santa Barbara, Calif: Fithian Press. ISBN 1-56474-210-5.
- Lyons, Timothy J. The silent partner: the history of the American Film Manufacturing Company, 1910-1921, New York: Arno Press, 1974 [c1972]. ISBN 0-405-04872-6.
- Slide, Anthony. The American Film Industry: A Historical Dictionary. New York: Limelight Editions, 1990. p. 17. ISBN 0-87910-139-3.
- Tompkins, Walker A. Santa Barbara History Makers. McNally & Loftin, Santa Barbara. 1983. ISBN 0-87461-059-1.
