= Jedermann (play) =

1911 play by Hugo von Hofmannsthal based on medieval mystery plays

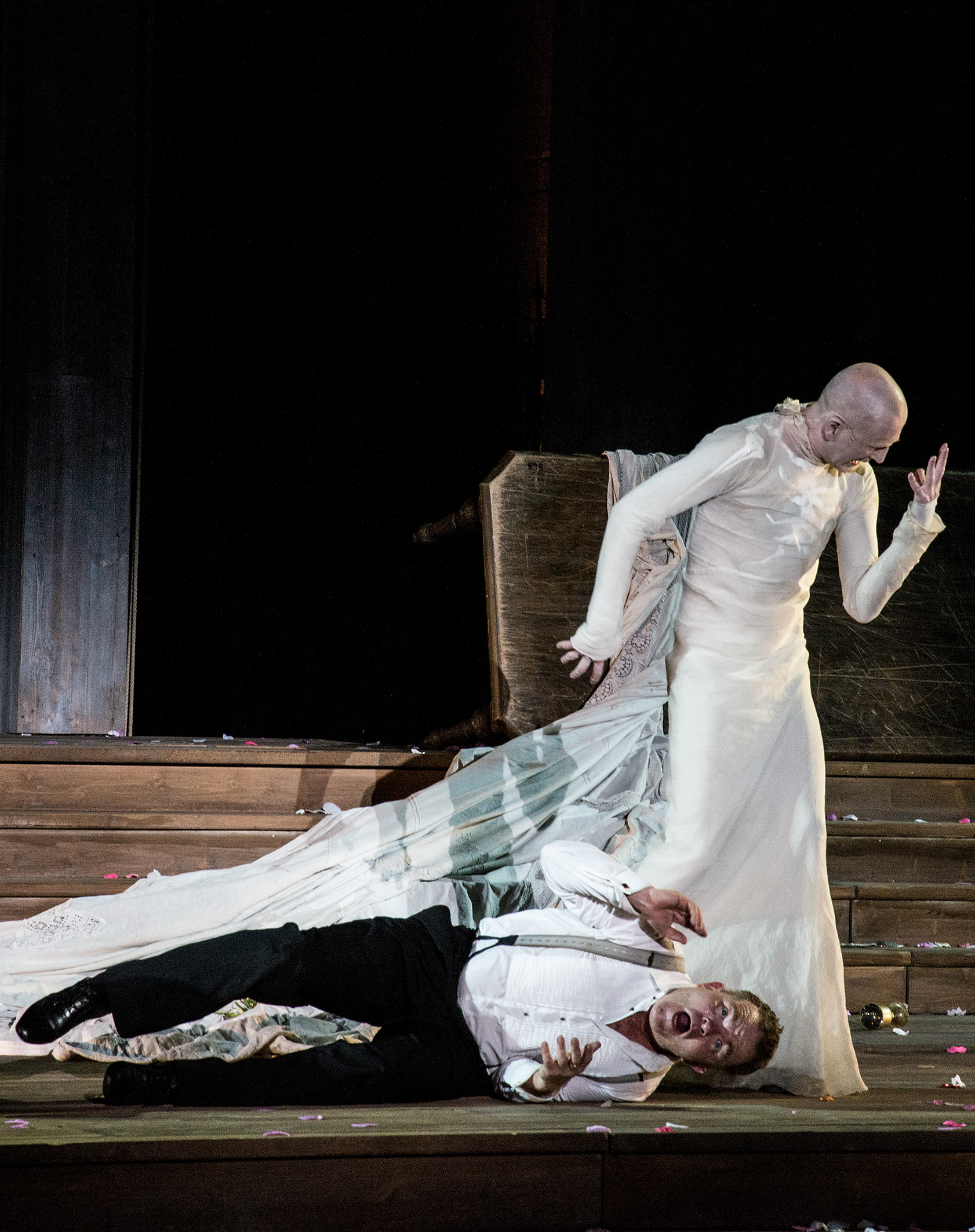
- Cornelius Obonya and Peter Lohmeyer portraying Jedermann and Tod at the Salzburg Festival in 2014
- Written by: Hugo von Hofmannsthal
- Characters: Jedermann; Tod; Buhlschaft
- Original language: German
- Genre: Drama

Premiere
- Date premiered: 1 December 1911

Jedermann. Das Spiel vom Sterben des reichen Mannes (Everyman. The play of the rich man's death) is a play by the Austrian playwright Hugo von Hofmannsthal. It is based on several medieval mystery plays, including the late 15th-century English morality play Everyman. It was first performed on 1 December 1911 in Berlin, directed by Max Reinhardt at the Circus Schumann. Since 1920, it has been performed regularly at the Salzburg Festival.

== Plot ==
God sends Death (Tod) to summon the rich bon viveur Jedermann who is then abandoned by his friends, his wealth and his lover (Buhlschaft).

== History ==
The play was conceived by Hugo von Hofmannsthal in the tradition of medieval morality plays, based on Elckerlijc (ca. 1470) by Peter van Diest, the late 15th-century English Everyman, Hecastus (1539) by Macropedius, and Hekastus (1549) by Hans Sachs. It was first performed on 1 December 1911 in Berlin under the direction of Max Reinhardt at the Circus Schumann (which later became the Großes Schauspielhaus).

1917 Jan 5 Los Angeles Evening Express ad for world premiere of The Play of Everyman, first English language adaptation of Jedermann

In 1917, an English language adaptation, The Play of Everyman, was performed at the Trinity Auditorium in Los Angeles and the Burbank Theater in Burbank, California, translated and adapted by George Sterling with "Richard" Ryszard Ordynski, music by Victor Schertzinger. The Sterling adaptation was performed again in 1936 at the Hollywood Bowl with music by Einar Nilson.

In 1920, it was performed at the Salzburg Festival, again staged by Reinhardt, and performed on the square in front of the Salzburg Cathedral. It has been performed annually there, except between 1922 and 1925 and during the years of the Nazi annexation of Austria and World War II from 1938 until 1946. Since then, the play has been performed there every year. Amongst the most famous actors performing the title role were Attila Hörbiger, Curd Jürgens, Klaus Maria Brandauer, Maximilian Schell and Gert Voss. As of 2019, Jedermann has been presented in 700 performances.

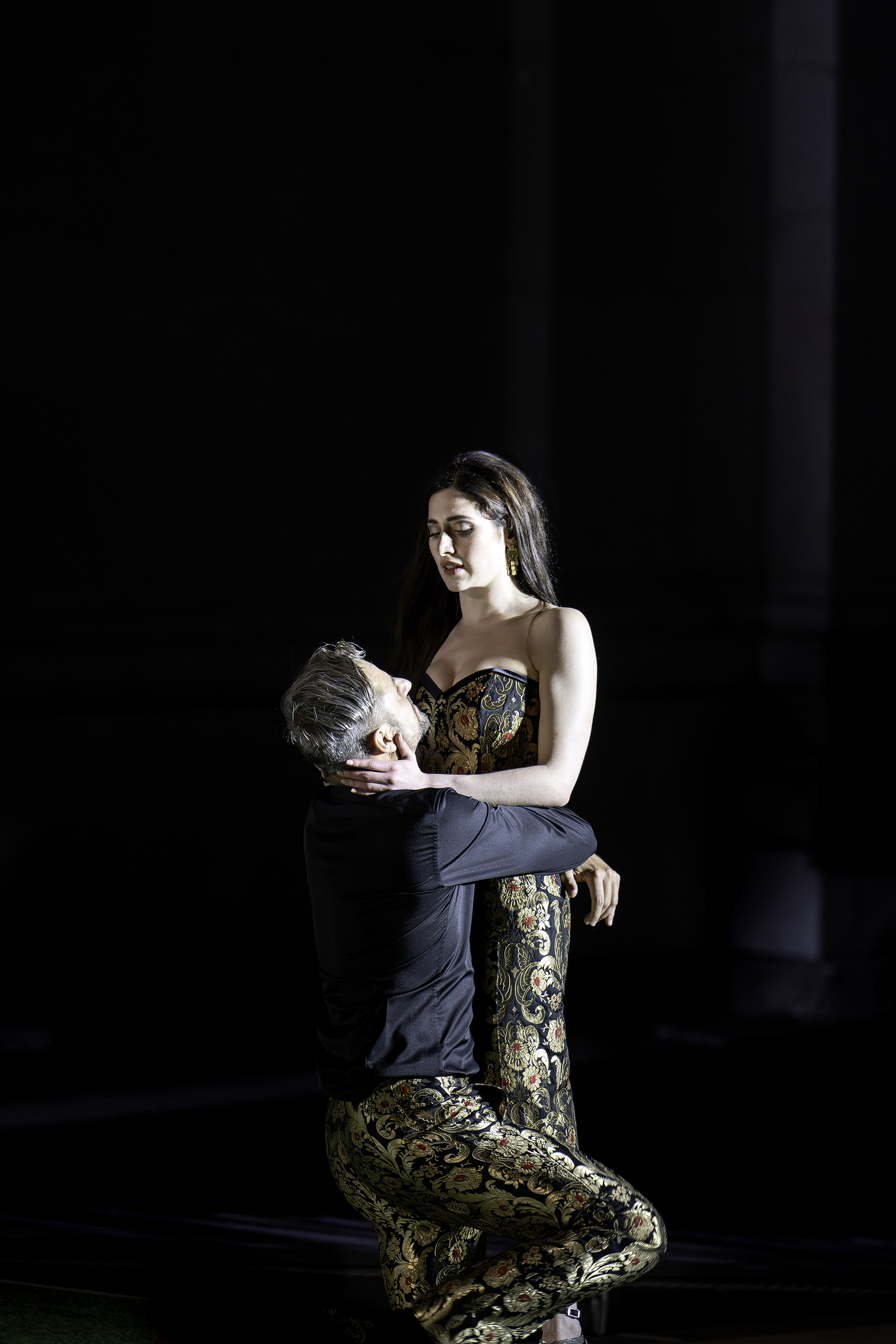
Jedermann (Philipp Hochmair) and Buhlschaft (Deleila Piasko), Salzburg Festival 2024

The play has been made into a film at least eight times, including in 1958, 1961, 1970, 1983, 2000, 2004, 2010, and 2013. The 1961 film Jedermann, directed by Max Reinhardt's son Gottfried Reinhardt and filmed at the Salzburg Festival, was submitted as the Austrian entry for the Best Foreign Language Film at the 34th Academy Awards, but it was not selected as one of the five nominees in the category.

== See also ==
- Jedermann (Sibelius), incidental music written by the composer for a production of the play in Finland in 1916.
- Sechs Monologe aus Jedermann for baritone or alto and orchestra (1943–44), by Frank Martin
