= Diest =

City and municipality in Flemish Brabant, Belgium

- City and municipality
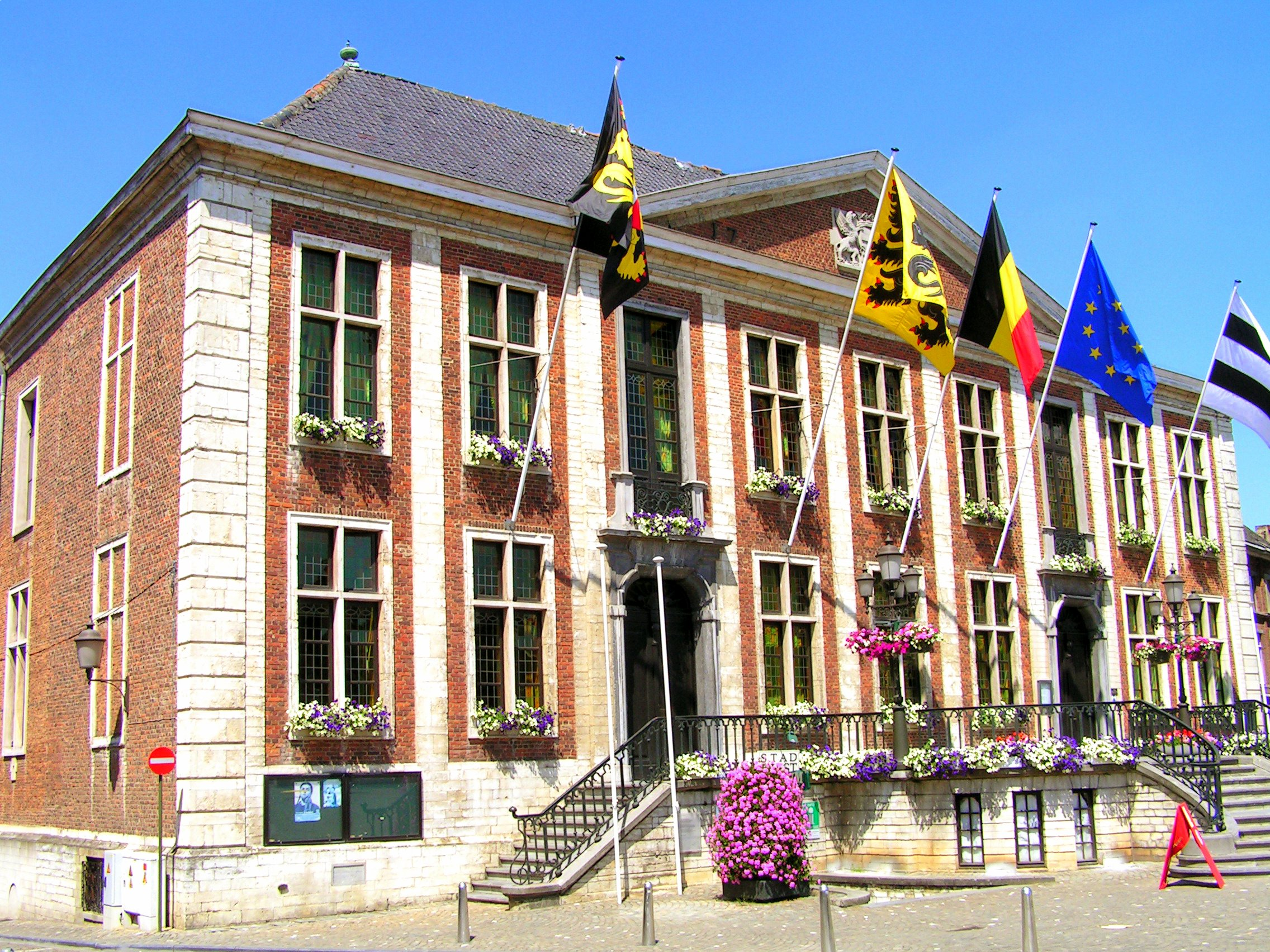
- Diest City Hall

- Flag Coat of arms

- Diest in the Province of Flemish Brabant
- Interactive map of Diest
- Location in Belgium
- Coordinates: 50°59′N 05°03′E
- Country: Belgium
- Community: Flemish Community
- Region: Flemish Region
- Province: Flemish Brabant
- Arrondissement: Leuven

Government
  - Mayor: Christophe De Graef (Open Diest)
  - Governing parties: Open Diest, Diest Solidair en Democratisch (DDS)

Area
  - Total: 58.72 km^{2} (22.67 sq mi)

Population (2018-01-01)
  - Total: 23,824
  - Density: 405.7/km^{2} (1,051/sq mi)
- Postal codes: 3290, 3293, 3294
- NIS code: 24020
- Area codes: 013 - 011
- Website: diest.be

Diest (Dutch pronunciation: [ˈdist]) is a city and municipality located in the Belgian province of Flemish Brabant. Situated in the northeast of the Hageland region, Diest neighbours the provinces of Antwerp to its North, and Limburg to the East and is situated around 60 km from Brussels. The municipality comprises the city of Diest proper and the towns of Deurne, Kaggevinne, Molenstede, Schaffen and Webbekom. As of January 1, 2006, Diest had a total population of 22,845. The total area is 58.20 km^{2} which gives a population density of 393 inhabitants per km^{2}.

== History ==
Between 1499 and 1795 the town was controlled by the House of Nassau (as were Breda in the Netherlands, Dillenburg in Germany and Orange in France) which was also the family of the Princes of Orange who at the end of the Napoleonic Wars became in 1815 the kings and queens of the Netherlands after the termination of the Dutch republic at the hands of revolutionary forces in 1795. The most famous representative of the House of Orange was William I of Orange-Nassau. Also known as William the Silent (1533-1584), who led the revolt of the United Provinces against Spain. His son Philip William - who unlike his father remained a pious Catholic throughout his life - is buried in Diest. In his will Philip William commanded that the city's parish church of Saint Sulpice should celebrate a yearly Requiem Mass for his soul.

Diest is surrounded by high ramparts, which are partially preserved.

== Attractions ==
The Grote Markt (Grand Square) is the central square of Diest and is surrounded by picturesque houses from the 16th to 18th Century. The city hall, which was designed in the 18th century by Willem Ignatius Kerricx, is also located here. In its basement is located the city museum. Exhibits in the museum include the armour of Philip of Orange and a portrait of René of Orange-Nassau and his wife Anna of Lorraine.

The church of St. Sulpitius is also located on the Grote Markt. It was built in 1417-1534 from brown sandstone, typical of this period. The grave of Philip of Orange can be found here. After the death of his father William I of Orange-Nassau, he became Lord of the city. In the turret on the church a famous carillon made by Pieter Hemony in 1671.

Town Centre: The house "Hof van Nassau" in the centre is worth a visit, along with the Gothic church of Our Lady (built 1253-1288) which has an impressive pulpit and high altar. In the Sint Jan Berchmansstraat is the "Gulden Maan", the house where St. John Berchmans was born.

=== Citadel of Diest ===
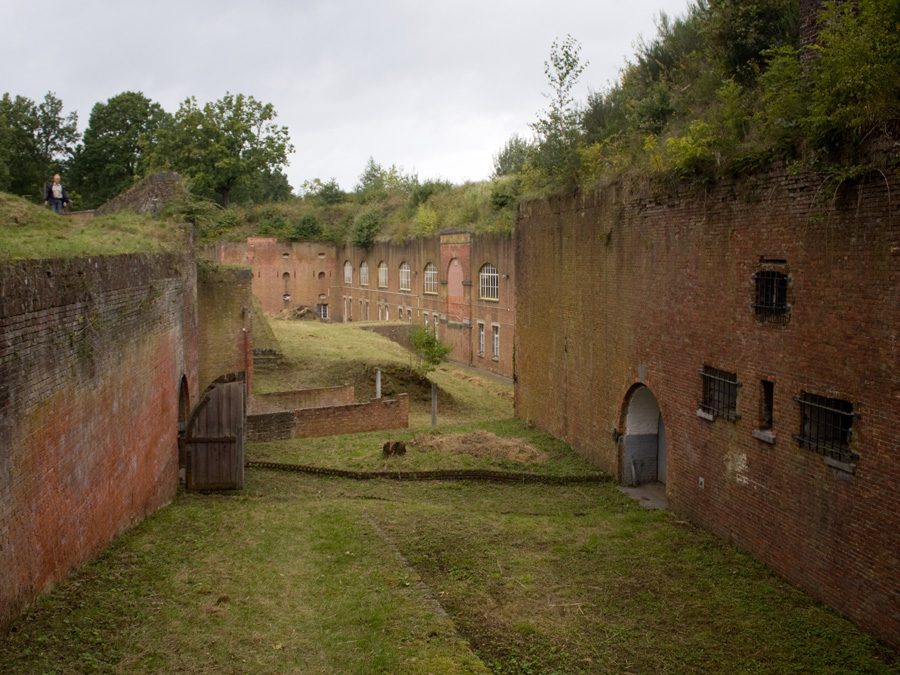
Inner moat of the citadel

The Citadel of Diest is the only brick citadel left in Flanders. The citadel was built between 1845 and 1843 on the Allerheiligenberg. The construction of the Citadel was the dominant final piece in the transformation of Diest into a fortified city, as the city walls and gates had been built prior. The whole structure is purely geared towards military functionality, with the only embellishment being the bluestone gate in neoclassical style.

The citadel is located on the hills on the Demer. Major Laurillard-Fallot (1787-1842) was responsible for its design. The structure has the shape of a bastioned pentagon with sides of about 190 meters. The whole was surrounded by a dry moat and in front of the gate was a drawbridge. The citadel is located on a site of 28ha and the buildings themselves cover an area of 10,200 m^{2}.

On August 26, 1895, the Royal Decree appeared declassifying the core fortress. The citadel served for a few more years as a barrage fortress to protect the railroad but suffered the same fate on April 20, 1906. After the declassification, a disciplinary company was stationed in the citadel. From 1930 to 1940, it housed a depot of the Third Army Corps. The Germans used the citadel during World War II, and after the surrender, the Allies used it for a short time as a prison. In 1946, National Defense Department placed the citadel at the disposal of the city, and 63 emergency houses were built there. Three years later, all kinds of renovation works to prepare the citadel as accommodation for the First Parachute Battalion began. They arrived on 2 August 1953. In 1968, the two city fronts of the citadel were partially demolished to make way for new buildings.

Since 1996 the citadel has been a protected monument. Together with the other parts of the Diestsesteenweg defence works, Fort Leopold, the Schaffensepoort, and the guard-locks of the Zichem and Leuven gates, it provides a good idea of the military architecture of the second quarter of the 19th century. In 2011, the citadel became vacant. The future of the citadel has not yet been determined. The city of Diest started looking for a new destination for the site.

In 2012, the city council of Diest decided to build a new hospital on the site. This new building were projected to be ready by 2023 in an agreement in principle between "stad Diest" and the "vzw Vereniging Diestse Ziekenhuizen". These plans were dropped in 2017 and a new destination is being sought for this listed site.

The citadel is home to various sports clubs, cultural associations, educational institutions and youth work. The municipality has made plans for better access with a new staircase and elevator. This should also make the citadel more attractive to tourists. In cooperation with private parties, the municipality will make plans for the further development of the citadel.

== Twin towns – sister cities ==
Diest is twinned with:

- Buren (Netherlands)
- Breda (Netherlands)
- Steenbergen (Netherlands)
- Dillenburg (Germany)
- Orange (France)

== Notable people from Diest ==
- Saint John Berchmans (1599–1621), Jesuit seminarian, born in Diest, canonized in 1888
- Martin Valvekens (1604–1682) Franciscan friar, historian
- Luís Cruls (1848-1908), astronomer
- Timmy Simons, footballer, played 82 times for the Belgium national team (as of 24 March 2011)
- Baron Bob Stouthuysen (b. 10 March 1929), businessman
- Omer Vanaudenhove (1913–1994), liberal politician
- Peter van Diest, writer, probable author of the play Elckerlijc
- Liliane Saint-Pierre, singer
- The Scabs, rock band of the 1980s and 1990s
- Philip William, Prince of Orange is buried in the church of Saint Sulpice
- Marleen Renders, Olympic athlete
- Marieke Vervoort, paralympic athlete
- Bruno Versavel, football player
- Kobe Pauwels, racing driver

== Images ==
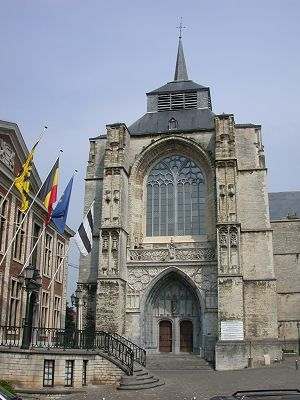
Saint Sulpitius church

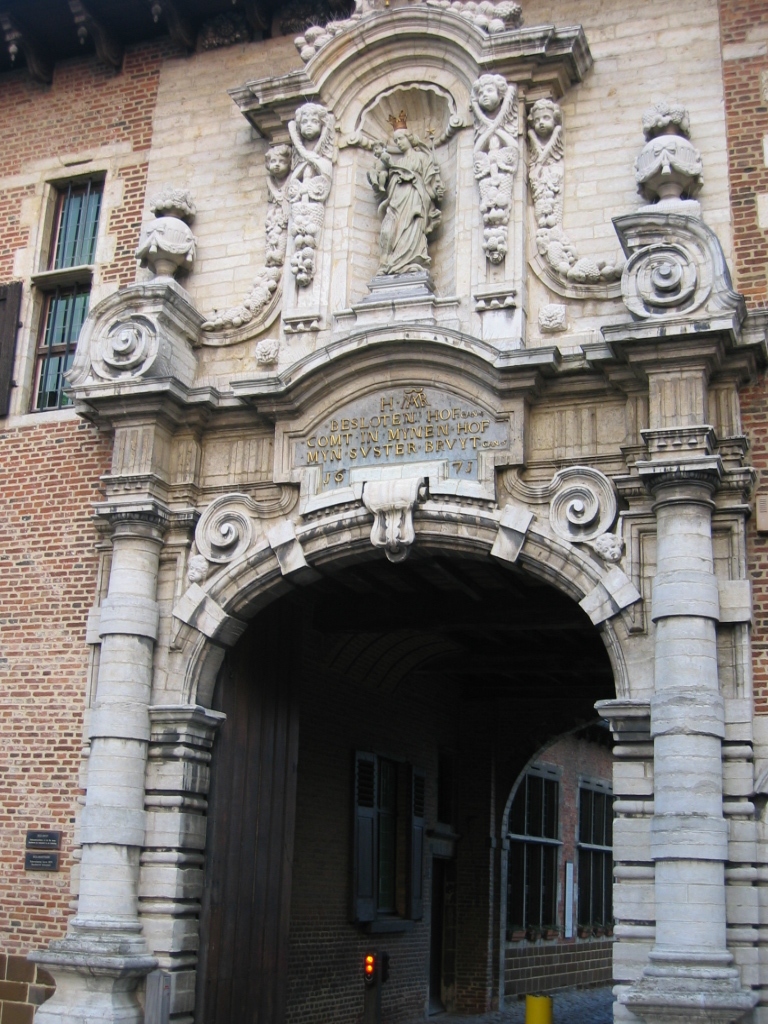
Entrance to the beguinage

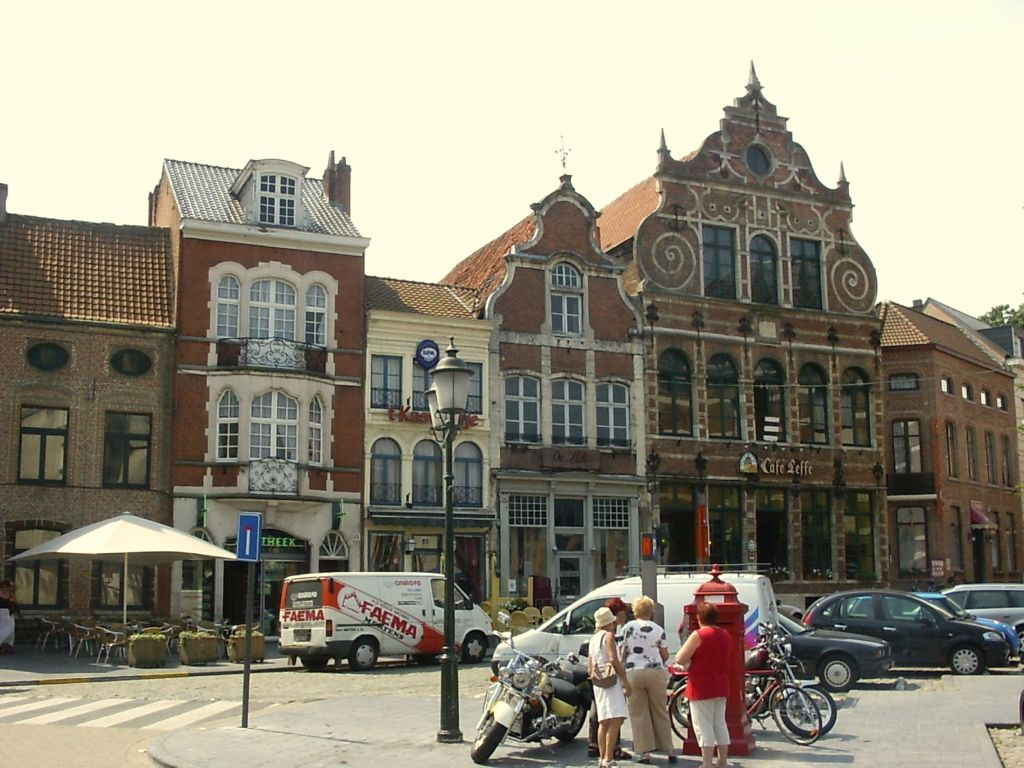
Grote Markt

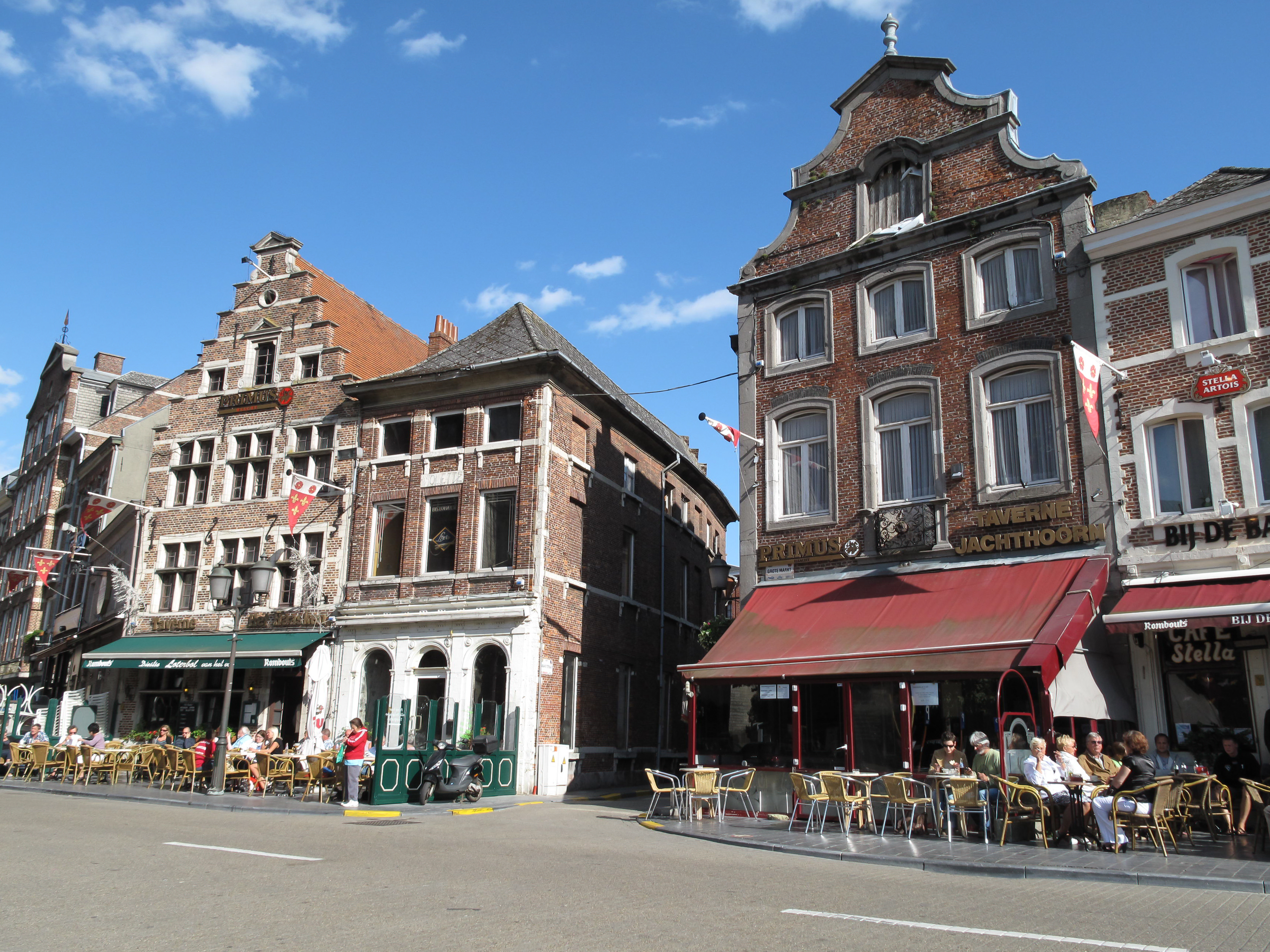
"Monumental" houses

== See also ==
- Bernardusdal Abbey
