= Sara Opal Search =

American composer (1890–1961)

Sara Opal Piontkowski Heron Search (14 July 1890 – 3 September 1961) was an American composer who wrote chamber music as well as works for orchestra, concert band, and voice under the names Opal Heron and Sara Opal Search.

Search was born in Fort Worth, Texas. Her mother was Countess Dolly von Piontkowski. Little is known about her education. She married Herbert Heron in 1905 or 1906, and they had two children, Billie and Constance. In 1923, she divorced Heron and married cellist and composer Frederick Preston Search, who was an orchestra leader at the Hotel del Monte in Carmel, California, at the time.

Search’s first composition, Symphony in c minor, was copyrighted in 1941. In a letter to Howes Norris Jr., who had requested her autograph, she noted that. . . "my Symphony in c minor is my first composition; Mr. Wallenstine [probably Alfred Wellenstein] is the first conductor to read it and conduct it; and you are the first person to ask me for my autograph!"

Search’s works are archived at the University of California, Berkeley’s Hargrove Music Library. Her compositions include:

== Band ==
- Barcarolle
- Serenade (trombone and concert band)
- Waltz

== Chamber ==
- Allegro Giocoso (flute solo)
- Quintet (woodwind quintet)
- Scherzo (string quartet)
- Solo for Cello
- Solo for Trumpet
- String Quartet in e flat minor
- String Quartet No. 2

== Orchestra ==
- Allegro Giocoso (flute and orchestra)
- Allegro Moderato (violin or cello and orchestra)
- Suite for Symphony Orchestra
- Symphony in c minor (string orchestra)
- Symphony No. 2

== Piano ==
- Go to Sleep
- Little Darling Waltz
- Nocturnes No. 1 and 2
- Pastoral
- Prelude
- Serenade
- Siesta
- Waltz
- Waltzing in the Park

== Vocal ==
- “Dirge” (voice and piano), lyrics by George Sterling from his play Lilith
- “I’m So Blue” (voice and piano)
- “Kathleen” (voice and piano)
- “Linda” (voice and piano)
- Remember, My Darling (voice, brass, and strings)
- “Song for Susie/Kitty Song” (voice and piano)
