= The Play of Everyman =

1917 play by George Sterling

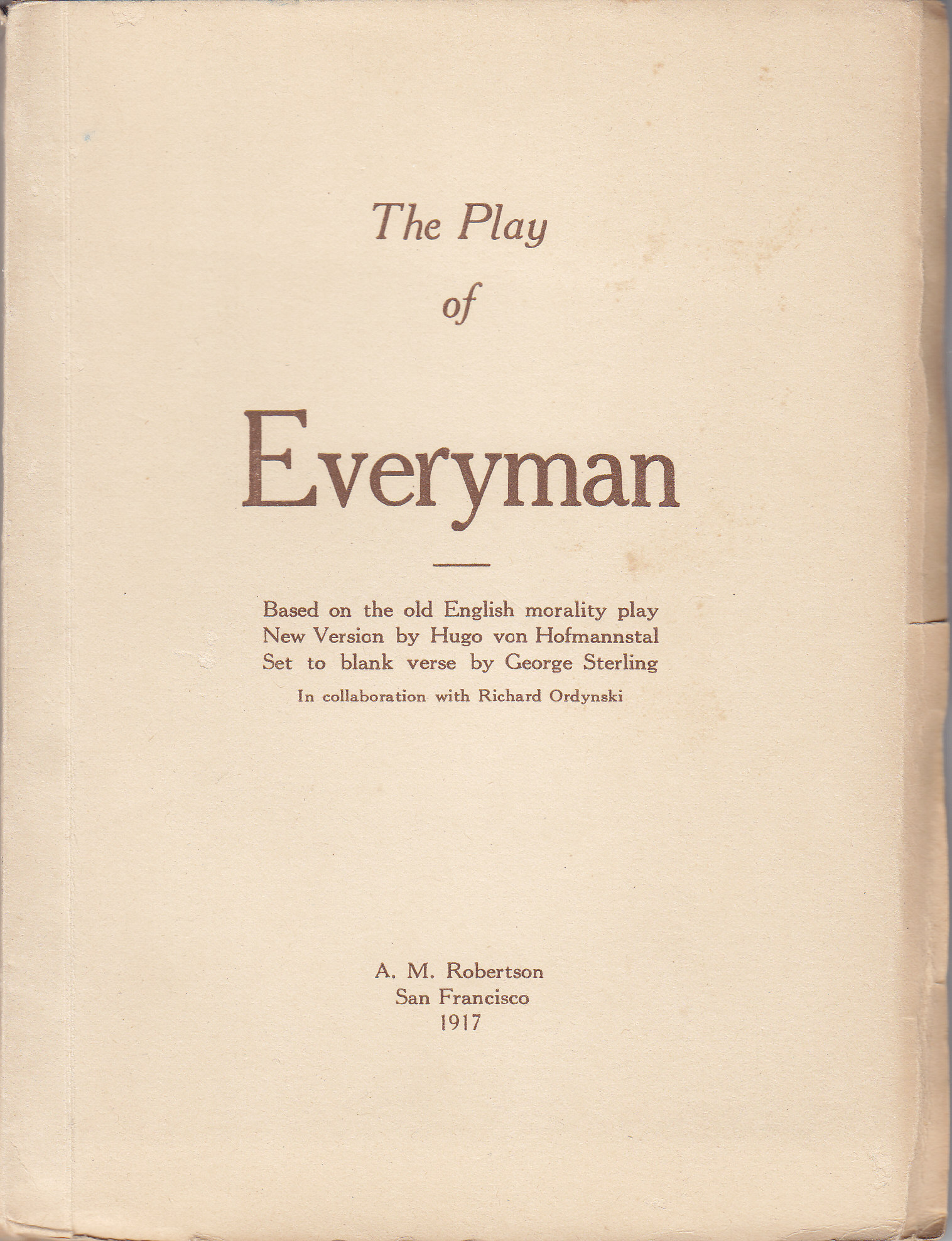
- First printing cover misspells "Hofmannsthal"
- Original language: English
- Written by: George Sterling, adapted and translated from play Jedermann by Hugo von Hofmannsthal
- Music by: Victor Schertzinger (1917), Einar Nilson and Juan Aguilar (1936)
- Lyrics by: George Sterling
- Characters: Everyman, Lord God, Death, Faith, Good Deeds, Devil, Mammon, Paramour, War, Workman
- Genre: Drama
- Setting: Everyman's mansion; a city square in front of a cathedral; a graveyard

Premiere
- Date: January 9, 1917
- Place: Trinity Auditorium, Los Angeles

The Play of Everyman is American poet and playwright George Sterling's adaptation of Austrian writer Hugo von Hofmannsthal's 1911 German play Jedermann. Lavish productions of The Play of Everyman in 1917 and 1936 were acclaimed by critics and boosted the careers of people involved. Sterling's adaptation was also staged in 1941 in New York City and 1977 in Brentwood, Los Angeles.

== Creation of The Play of Everyman ==
Austrian writer Hugo von Hofmannsthal combined the Middle English play Everyman with three other medieval plays to make one new play in German: Jedermann: Das Spiel vom Sterben des reichen Mannes. His German play was a success in Berlin in 1911. A paperback book of the German Jedermann sold well enough to require several printings. Austrian-Polish stage and film director Ryszard "Richard" Ordynski acquired the rights from Hofmannsthal to stage an English language version of Jedermann and to print it as a book.

Ordynski persuaded his lover, oil heiress Aline Barnsdall, to finance Jedermann's first English language stage production in Los Angeles. He gave the German Jedermann book to a stenographer with the German consulate in Los Angeles to translate into English. Ordynski chose poet and playwright George Sterling to turn the stenographer's rough translation into a polished play. He offered Sterling half the writer's royalties from play ticket and book sales, with the other half of the writer's royalties paid to Hofmannsthal. In late 1916, Sterling traveled from his San Francisco home to Los Angeles to work with Ordynski on the new play.

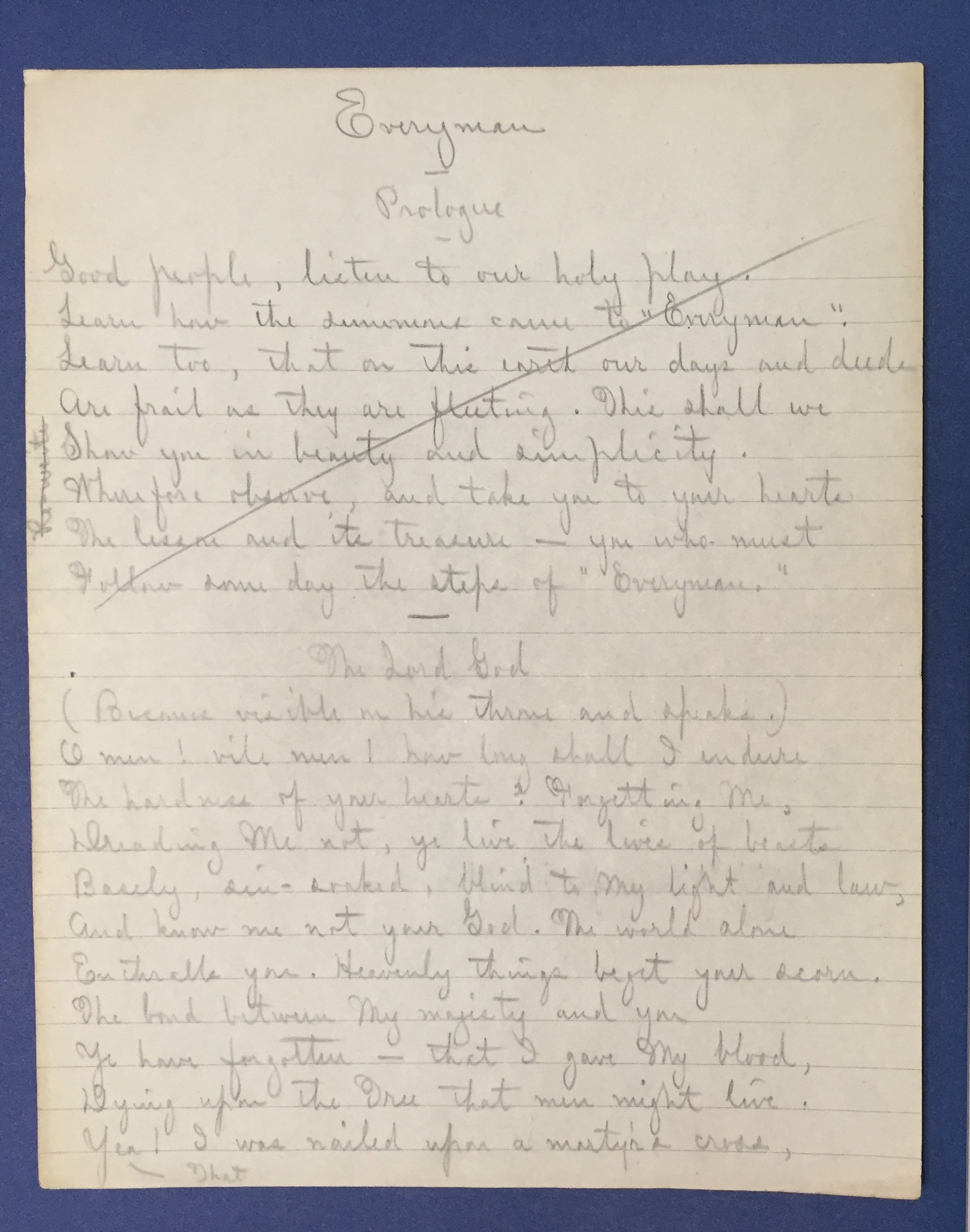
1916 first page of the pencil first draft of The Play of Everyman by George Sterling.

Sterling found the stenographer's translation "difficult material to work on." He also had a copy of Jedermann in German. Fortunately, Sterling studied German in high school, Ordynski was fluent in German and English, and Sterling probably had a German-English dictionary. Hofmannsthal used rhyming couplets for all dialog, which to Sterling sounded artificial. He transformed the characters' speech into more natural and dramatic blank verse to, he said, "lend an articulation, flexibility and suspense not readily accessible to one who would use the other (and monotonous) form." Hofmannsthal included four songs; Sterling replaced one with a completely new song and revised two others. At Ordynski's suggestion, Sterling added two new characters, War (reflecting then-current World War I), and Workman (expressing Sterling's support of socialism). Sterling also changed scenes and dialogs. Instead of writing a faithful translation, he adapted Jedermann into what he hoped would be a more emotionally compelling experience, a "re-working of the ... play rather than a translation. ... Not only does Sterling add characters but he alters our perception of the existing ones as well. He seems to attempt to update and correct the original rather than translating it." As the play's opening night drew nearer, Sterling put in longer hours. He worked on Christmas Day from 8:00 in the morning to 11:40 at night so the following morning of December 26 he could rush The Play of Everyman manuscript to a printer. The frantic printer managed to typeset, print, and bind 200 books in time to sell at the January 8 opening performance.

== Synopsis ==
The Lord God is dismayed to have been forgotten by man. He sends Death to retrieve Everyman.

At his mansion, wealthy Everyman calls for his Steward and Cook to prepare a feast for his family and friends. Everyman meets his flattering Friend. A Poor Neighbor begs Everyman for money but feels disappointed to receive just a tiny coin. Everyman meets a Debtor led by two Officers. Everyman filed a legal complaint against the Debtor, so the officers are taking him to prison. The debtor's wife and children follow, dressed in rags. Everyman tells his friend to find shelter for the Debtor's children and wife so Everyman will no longer hear "her wails." An old Workman asks Everyman for "a pittance for mine age," but Everyman angrily refuses him and sends him back to work. Everyman's Mother warns him about abandoning the church and focusing on money and worldly joys.

Everyman's Paramour brings him to his feast. A Singer sings about feasting, drinking, companions, and love, interrupted briefly by War, who asks Everyman to join him. Everyman refuses, and his companions resume singing, drinking, and feasting. Everyman speaks of his own death. His guests try to cheer him with humor, songs, and wine. Death appears and tells Everyman he must take him immediately, but Everyman persuades Death to give him one hour to find someone who will go with him to Death.

Everyman tries to find a person to accompany him but fails. Mammon says riches will not go with Everyman to Death. A frail, weak woman, the Good Deeds of Everyman, speaks from her sickbed. Good Deeds says she will go with Everyman to Death. She summons her sister, Faith. Everyman proclaims his faith in God. Everyman's Mother on her way to early mass hears angels sing and knows her son's soul is healed. The Debtor and the Workman help Good Deeds rise. A Monk takes Everyman away to sanctify him. A Devil tries to block Faith and Good Deeds. Death bells ring. The Devil fails and leaves Faith and Good Deeds. Everyman returns, transformed. Death returns. Good Deeds, Faith, and Everyman stand before his grave, then they enter the grave together. Again, angels sing.

== Richard Ordynski's 1917 production ==
Producer-director Ordynski's plan was to premiere The Play of Everyman in a one-week engagement at a large theater in Los Angeles, then move the production for limited engagements first to San Francisco, then to Oakland, and finally, if all went well, to New York City.

To match Sterling's new lyrics for the play's songs, Ordynski hired composer Victor Schertzinger to write new song music, plus an overture and incidental music for the play. Ordynski booked the huge Trinity Auditorium, which seated 2,500 spectators and claimed to feature the largest pipe organ in the western United States. Schertzinger's music score incorporated the organ plus a twenty-piece orchestra and a choir.

Ordynski hired a cast of 46 actors, including some familiar to audiences from theatre and silent film appearances. All were cast locally, except one: To play the title role of Everyman, who appears in almost every scene, Ordynski brought leading man Gareth Hughes from New York. Ordynski and Hughes had worked together before.

1917 Jan 5 Los Angeles Evening Express ad for world premiere of The Play of Everyman by George Sterling

For weeks before the show's opening, publicists for The Play of Everyman saturated southern Californians with stories about the drama. Publicity about its music, actors, costume designer, and producer-director Ordynski appeared in newspapers from large to tiny. The cast and crew appeared on radio shows, club meetings, schools, and churches. Even Sterling did his part: "I'm helping out all I can to advertise the play. I spoke on it yesterday at the Friday Morning Club, am to address some men's uplift club this noon, and talk to a high-school bunch on Tuesday. New job for me! I hate it, but it seems to be the square thing to do. Ordynski and the others aren't sparing themselves."

Ordynski scheduled opening night for Monday, January 8, 1917, but his complicated production was not ready. He pushed opening night back to Tuesday, January 9. His team's unceasing publicity work paid off. Pastors and even a bishop told their congregations to see the play. Advance ticket sales were brisk. Excited audiences applauded, and all critics' reviews were enthusiastic. Ordynski's production seemed to be a hit.

The Play of Everyman had only one week at the Trinity Auditorium because Nobel Prize winner Rabindranath Tagore was booked to lecture there. After Everyman's successful one-week stay at Trinity, Ordynski relocated the drama to the large Burbank Theater for another one-week run. The Burbank run was not supported by another wave of publicity. Ticket sales were weak. The Play of Everyman lost money in Burbank. After Burbank, Ordynski canceled planned San Francisco performances and returned to New York, where he directed operas for the New York Metropolitan Opera. He hoped to use costumes and sets from his California production to stage The Play of Everyman in New York. Near the end of 1917, Ordynski asked Gareth Hughes to star again in the title role, this time in New York. Hughes agreed, but Ordynski could not find backers. His lavish production was never restaged.

=== 1917 critical reception ===
Reviews were enthusiastic. No unfavorable reviews appeared. National showbusiness news magazine Variety said: "The production is elaborate and the presentation is an artistic triumph."

Los Angeles Times reviewer Henry Christeen Warnack: "... the beautiful Von Hofmannst[ha]l version[ ]has been translated from the German into blank verse of a joyous stride by California's premier poet, George Sterling. ... Special music had been composed for the production by Victor Schertzinger and the orchestra was conducted by Herr Adolph Tandler, with Prof. Charles H. Demorest serving the occasion as organist. All of this was quite important for without significant music the spiritual suggestion of the story would be lost. ... Gareth Hughes, as Everyman, reminds one of the old school of actors at the best of their youth in Hamlet."

Los Angeles Evening Express drama critic George St. George: "There is something very beautiful and very impressive about Everyman as presented by Richard Ordynski and Aline Barnsdall at Trinity Auditorium this week. From the standpoint of dramatic value and human interest it is[ ]much ahead of the old English version ... the new Everyman, in the beautiful, simple English of George Sterling, should prove a success from a popular as well as an artistic standpoint. ... Ordynski is the first man to introduce Los Angeles to the real possibilities of stage lighting, and last night, in a hall utterly devoid of the most simple requirements in this field, he played upon the emotions as effectively with his lights as did either Mr. Schertzinger's music or Mr. Sterling's book. ... Everyman ... is not gruesome nor depressing and, as presented last night in the midst of wonderfully effective settings, glowingly beautiful costumes and symbolic music, it is far removed from the tiresome palaver that is frequently set forth. ... Victor Schertzinger has written a musical setting that is impressively beautiful. He has "moded" his music admirably to Mr. Sterling's text and it had no small part in lifting last night's performance to a thing above ordinary."

Los Angeles Record: "From the viewpoint of modern stage productions, the presentation of Everyman, given at Trinity Auditorium Tuesday night, was most important. It ranks with the best that America has produced for several years..."

=== 1917 book of the play ===
The book printers rushing to meet their opening night deadline misspelled the name "Hofmannsthal" on The Play of Everyman's front cover and title page. Only 200 copies of the erroneous book were printed in time for the show's first performance.

More than 2,000 copies of a second printing of The Play of Everyman—with a cast list and corrected front cover and title page—were delivered in time to sell at a few of the final Burbank shows. With no more performances, second printing sales were dismal. Sterling's hopes of royalty payments from book sales were dashed.

Review galleys went to only a few book reviewers in California. The first opinion printed was in the Los Angeles Evening Express: "George Sterling has done a masterly piece of work in his English adaptation of von Hoffmanstahl's version of this play. Always pleasing in his writings, this California poet has outdone himself in Everyman." Two days later, George St. George of the same paper stated: "It will be found that the new Everyman is really new. Not only has it been made to fit modern conditions, but new characters have been introduced and the various themes have been treated in a different manner. A reading of this new version impresses one with its simplicity, its greatly increased dramatic value, the skill with which the new characters have been introduced, and the general broadening of scope and virility of ideas. It is really a very fine work and one which cannot well fail to make an impression." William Randolph Hearst's San Francisco Examiner summarized: "George Sterling's verse is clear and strong, and throughout the play it appears natural and spontaneous." The San Francisco Chronicle began: "George Sterling reaches for and firmly grasps dramatic laurels in his metrical version of The Play of Everyman. ... Where von Hofmannstal ends and Sterling begins is not to be told in the absence of the original text, but it is enough to say that the American poet begins and ends well."

=== 1917 characters and cast ===
Prologue – Marjorie Day
Lord God – Irving Pichel
Death – Clyde McCoy
Faith – Veda McEvers
Good Deeds – Violette Wilson
Devil – Percival Vivian
Mammon – James H. Finlayson
War – Harold S. Skinner
Everyman – Gareth Hughes
Everyman's Mother – Kirah Markham
Friend – Irving Pichel
Paramour – Ann Andrews
Thin Cousin – Margaret T. Allen
Fat Cousin – Athol Hayes
Steward – Bruno Schuman
Cook – Miriam Meredith
Poor Neighbor – George Warren
Debtor – Ford Tarpley
Debtor's Wife – Irene Bevans
Workman – Philip Gastrock
A Servant – George Hackathorne
Monk – Gordon Thomas
Guests – Misses Vernon, Boike, Burgner, Collier, Davis, Holmes, Ingham, Moore, Rottman; Messrs. McCullough, Nieto, Sleeper, Vickers
Servants – Miss LeClerq, Miss Lee, Mr. Williams
Officers – Mr. Curran, Mr. James
Pages – Miss Riley, Miss Dunaway
Musicians – Miss Margrage, Miss Barnes
Angels – Miss Goodall, Miss Hopkins, Miss Michaels, Miss Price

== Irving Thalberg's 1936 production ==
In September 1936 (ten years after Sterling's death), The Play of Everyman was staged at the Hollywood Bowl, which seats 26,000 spectators. Top Hollywood, Broadway, and European talents produced, promoted, staged, and performed the Bowl production, an artistic triumph but a financial loss.

The Play of Everyman's Hollywood Bowl production had its origin two years before, in an extravagant 1934 presentation of William Shakespeare's A Midsummer Night's Dream. The California Festival Association presented Shakespeare's comedy outdoors at the Bowl with grand sets and a large cast. Swedish composer Einar Nilson wrote and conducted original music. The production generated enthusiastic reviews and sold 129,000 tickets in one week, an enormous success.

=== Selection of the director, producer, and play ===
Two years later, the California Festival Association wanted to repeat that success. The managing director of the Association paid Johannes Poulsen, director of the Royal Theatre of Denmark, to travel to Los Angeles to discuss presenting a play in California. Poulsen arrived June 6, 1936, and agreed to direct a spectacular play in the Hollywood Bowl. Next, the Association needed the money to book the Bowl and to promote and stage a play. Millenium Biltmore Hotel owner Barron Long told his friend the movie producer and M-G-M cofounder Irving Thalberg that the Association wanted to produce a spectacular outdoor play but lacked the money to stage one. In late June or early July Thalberg asked the Festival Association to donate a big portion of any profits to benefit Jewish refugees fleeing Nazi Germany. In exchange, he agreed to take the production under his wing.

Einar Nilson (the Association's artistic director) suggested a play for the Association to consider: Hofmannsthal's Jedermann. Nilson had already written music for an early performance of Jedermann. In addition, in 1917 Poulsen had staged the first performance in Denmark of Jedermann. If the Association wished to present a big outdoor production of Jedermann, one tested English-language adaptation was available: George Sterling's The Play of Everyman. The Festival Association chose Sterling's adaptation for its next spectacle.

=== Financing, promotion, and production ===
Thalberg's first priority was financing the large production. He approached Attilio Henry "Doc" Giannini, M.D., brother of Bank of America founder A. P. Giannini. Doc Giannini was the bank's Chairman of the Executive Committee and its senior executive in southern California. He was one of the world's top experts in entertainment financing. Thalberg persuaded Doc Giannini to approve The Play of Everyman's financing from the Bank of America. Once Thalberg arranged funding, the California Festival Association booked dates for Sterling's The Play of Everyman in the Hollywood Bowl that September.

Thalberg arranged star-studded events to publicize The Play of Everyman. The first was a reception honoring Johannes Poulson. The event was held by actor-producer Mary Pickford July 22 on the 18-acre grounds of the famous estate Pickfair, built in the 1920s by Pickford and her then-husband, actor-producer Douglas Fairbanks. In 1924, Mary Pickford had enjoyed lunches with Sterling (who by all accounts was a dazzling conversationalist) every day for two weeks while Sterling wrote screen titles for Fairbanks' silent movie The Thief of Bagdad.

Nine nights after Pickford's reception, Doc Giannini announced he had placed Einar Nilson in charge of Everyman's "artistic direction, musical score creation, and casting." Nilson announced that famed artist Kay Nielsen was coming from Denmark to design sets and costumes. The California Festival Association announced the eight performance nights for Everyman: Opening night would be Thursday, September 10, and the play's last performance Thursday, September 17. Tickets went on sale August 7. The first person to buy box seats was Mary Pickford.

Charlie Chaplin met George Sterling in 1924 and enjoyed his company, later asking the poet to return from San Francisco to Hollywood to "go on a tear with him." The Bowl production required a place to build its huge sets, rehearse its projected cast of 500, make hundreds of costumes, and manage everything. Chaplin donated use of his Chaplin Studios for The Play of Everyman. On Monday, August 10, just one month from opening night, the production moved in: "The facilities of Charles Chaplin's studio will be taken over today by the Everyman company ... Noted film producer and patron of the arts, Chaplin has given to Everyman's [director], Johannes Poulsen, free range of his studio including stage, mill, wardrobe, telephone switchboard, and several offices."

On August 25, actor and opera singer George Houston was cast as Everyman. His wife, actress Leone Sousa, had been named the most beautiful woman in the Ziegfeld Follies. She was cast as Everyman's lover. The Houstons had only sixteen days to learn their parts before opening night.

The night of August 28, the last show of the Hollywood Bowl's summer season ended. As soon as the audience left, a work crew started taking down the Bowl stage's gigantic shell to make room for Everyman's even more gigantic sets: Everyman's mansion, another building, and a wide, 30-foot-tall stairway topped off with an 80-foot-tall gold cathedral, whose large doors would "open to disclose a magnificent heaven in the final scenes of the play." In the Chaplin Studios, while Poulsen rehearsed actors and dancers, carpenters built sets, seamstresses sewed hundreds of costumes, and Nilson rehearsed Los Angeles Philharmonic musicians and singers, including a chorus of 150 voices. Nilson made many changes to his earlier score for Jedermann. He hired composer Juan Aguilar to arrange several parts of his score. Aguilar also wrote a new ballet number. Nilson planned to install in the Bowl a new, large organ, which Aguilar would play.

On Wednesday evening, September 2, Irving Thalberg and his wife, Academy Award-winning actress Norma Shearer, hosted a reception and banquet at the Biltmore Hotel in honor of Johannes Poulsen. Attendance was estimated at 300 to 350 people by the Los Angeles Times, as many as 700 people by other newspapers. The celebrity-filled event was covered by all major local papers and was broadcast live on radio. The caliber and quantity of show business celebrities in attendance gave testimony to Thalberg's power in the entertainment world: movie stars, producers, directors, screenwriters, studio heads. Los Angeles Times publishers Harry Chandler (who founded the Biltmore Hotel and the Hollywood Bowl) and his son Norman Chandler were also present. Toastmaster Rupert Hughes, a top writer of the day, joined Eddie Cantor to crack jokes, then became serious and said: "Of all the plays I have ever seen in my life, not one held the audience so enthralled as Everyman. [It] is as full of suspense and as modern as tomorrow." The two men then introduced the banquet's general chairman Irving Thalberg, who spoke briefly. Then Doc Giannini was introduced as principal speaker. He said Everyman had been selected "because it is generally conceded to be the most stirring drama of human life ever written. ... It is with pride that I remind you this version of Everyman was translated into English by none other than our beloved California poet, the late George Sterling." Giannini then introduced director Poulsen, who thanked Thalberg for his work promoting the play.

Meanwhile, work on the Bowl production had accelerated: "Eleventh hour preparations are at top speed to have all in readiness for the star-studded opening. ... Everyman will be given in its most modern version with full symphony orchestra, mammoth ballet, titanic choruses and ensembles of atmospheric supernumeraries totaling 500. ...intensive day and night rehearsals are in order." "While a crew of workmen continued construction of the gigantic stage in twenty-four-hour shifts ... Johannes Poulsen moved his cast of about 500 from temporary headquarters at Chaplin studio to the Bowl for the first informal rehearsal today. Completion of the stage, specially enlarged to cover the orchestra pit and first row of boxes to accommodate the supporting choruses, ballets and ensembles, is expected by Monday." That Monday was the Labor Day holiday, but workers never stopped. Formal dress rehearsals at the Bowl began that day. From three cathedrals in Europe, five giant bells, centuries old, each weighing more than a ton, were moved into place at the Bowl.

Tuesday, September 8, Irving Thalberg was stuck at home in bed with a cold. It had been a warm, 86-degree day, but in late afternoon the temperature dropped and wind brought in chilly sea-fog. Undeterred by the cold weather, Thalberg rose from his sickbed to go to the Bowl to help Poulsen with a dress rehearsal. The next night, Wednesday, September 9, Thalberg and Shearer went to the Bowl again to attend the final dress rehearsal.

=== 1936 opening night ===
On Thursday, September 10, thousands of spectators entered the Hollywood Bowl, wending their way through rows of huge Klieg lights shooting columns of white light into the darkening sky. It was opening night, the first performance of Thalberg and Poulsen's spectacular production. Reporters and photographers swarmed the Bowl. Attending celebrities generated as much news coverage as the play itself. Mary Pickford drew the most photographs, making her first appearance in public with her new lover Charles "Buddy" Rogers. Of course, Irving Thalberg and his wife Norma Shearer were photographed, and Doc Giannini with his wife, as well as other famous couples: Charlie Chaplin and Paulette Goddard, Clark Gable and Carole Lombard, Jack Benny and Mary Livingstone, Benny's best friend George Burns and Gracie Allen, Merle Oberon and David Niven. Reporters wrote lists of celebrities that seemed endless. Before the play, handsome, deep-voiced movie and radio star Conrad Nagel introduced Thalberg. 12,000 people applauded him. It was Thalberg's last public appearance.

Director Johannes Poulsen described the opening performance's beginning: "Finally we could start playing for around 20,000 spectators—a vast, undulating sea of people. ... Now five enormous church bells started to ring. This detail was in itself a sensation because in Hollywood you never hear a church bell. And now the composer Einar Nilsson's [sic] lovely heavenly chorus commenced."

The Los Angeles Times reported the play's climax: "When the curved golden door[s] of the cathedral opened, the audience gasped and applauded. Revealed were depths of blue heavens with tiny clouds such as only Fran Angelic[o] has dreamed. Amid the clouds the Virgin was enthroned in pink robes, adored by kneeling saints—behind her a choir of praying angels—the whole a vision of inestimable beauty."

=== 1936 subsequent performances ===
Friday and Saturday performances of The Play of Everyman also drew large crowds. But before dawn the morning of Sunday, a backstage fire of unknown origin burned 120 women's costumes. Producers cancelled Sunday's show. "Early Sunday morning, the management was confronted with the overwhelming fact that 120 of the beautiful costumes had been destroyed by fire in the night. These costumes had been created at great expense by thirty to forty seamstresses after many days of hard work. Without pausing to complain everyone went to work and by ten o'clock Sunday morning forty sewing women had rallied to the cause and were at work on many yards of material which had been obtained after getting several merchants of Los Angeles to open their stores [normally closed on Sunday]. This loyal group, by working day and night, have accomplished the impossible and the show goes on tonight after a complete replacement of the costumes destroyed."

On Monday, September 14, at 10:16 a.m., Irving Thalberg died of pneumonia. Fred Niblo, one of the top movie directors in the world, had known Thalberg well. Before Monday night's Everyman began, Niblo stepped before the Bowl audience of 18,000 "with a tribute to Irving Thalberg and asked the audience to bow their heads for ten seconds. After that reverent pause the production began," with the somber cathedral bells tolling forth.

At Thalberg's Wednesday morning funeral, Rabbi Edgar F. Magnin delivered Thalberg's eulogy. Magnin began with The Play of Everyman: "It is strange that Irving, who dedicated his life to inspiring entertainment, should have attended Everyman, the last vehicle of entertainment he was to see. There is a lesson there for many, but when the Grim Reaper came to Irving, he came to one who was not vain, not drunk with power or lusting for wealth, but to a man, as I knew him, who was sweet and kind and charming."

Thursday, September 17 was scheduled to be The Play of Everyman's final show, but the unexpected happened: "Approximately 20,000 persons visited Hollywood Bowl last night to comprise the largest audience to see Everyman since the start of its run a week ago. A last-minute rush for seats found 5,000 waiting outside the amphitheater at curtain time and delayed the pageant's start half an hour. That, together with the mounting demand for reservations promising audience totaling over 100,000, led officials of the California Festival Association to extend the play's engagement for another evening." The day after adding the Friday performance, Doc Giannini announced Everyman would be extended one more day to Saturday, September 19.

Even with the two extra performances, the elaborate Bowl production lost money. "It failed to click financially," wrote Everyman's publicity manager Henry Hammond "Hamm" Beall, "and the variance between receipts and contracted expenses was sizable. The result: at this writing mutterings [of] unpaid creditors, and indirectly Hollywood's credit a little lower." Estimates of losses ranged from $37,000 to $80,000.

=== 1936 critical reception ===
Eleanor Barnes evaluated the Bowl production in the Daily News in a detailed, even-handed review: "Of course spectacle dominates. It is really Designer Kay Niels[e]n's victory rather than Poulsen's. Pageantry is paramount and all important. In the individual episodes between one, two, or three characters, Poulsen's direction is admirable and strong. But it is weak where the mass scenes hold sway, the orgy sequence being a bit tame and needing an injection of robustness. ... The direction seems too closed in, Poulsen having kept Everyman's activities confined to an area stage center so that instead of realizing drama in Everyman seeking comradeship, much of the effectiveness is lost by not having him move from the spot. Instead everyone comes to him and the results are static. However, the general effect of Everyman is exciting and Poulsen deserves credit for its smooth performance and soul searching drama. Where pageantry is concerned, Everyman is thrilling. ... Everyman is Designer Kay Niels[e]n's triumph. This brilliant Nordic artist, whose illustrations of the Hans Andersen fairy books have made him world famous, has created magnificent costumes in rich settings, lavish, theatric, vivid, yet simple withal in conception and detail. His knowledge of color and its blending is amazing." Barnes went on to detail the music, dancing, and individual actors' performances.

Almost all other reviews were enthusiastic, as three samples demonstrate. In the Los Angeles Times, James Warnack wrote: "Portraying the clashing emotions of the soul as perhaps does no other play, Everyman ... thrills the spectator [of] ... this brilliant production with its wondrous scenic and lighting effects, its gorgeous costumes and, above all, its clarion call of hope and trust to a cynical generation."

John Steven McGroarty in the Times: "I saw with my own eyes the appeal of Everyman ... It was so vast that it held that audience hushed and awed, an audience that left the theater silent and voiceless when the play was done, ten thousand people of the world's age of jazz with no words to put chatter in their thoughts when the Gates of God closed upon them in the dome of the blue night sky. That is why I say I would be sorry for anyone who fails to witness it. ... Everyman takes us back to the path from which we have strayed, and, finding that lost path again, it appears more beautiful than any we have since found. And so we come away from the play with a strange new happiness in our hearts. ... That such magic of stage craft were possible no one would ever dream."

Elizabeth Yeaman in the Hollywood Citizen-News: "The symbolical tableau is offered with extraordinary beauty of setting, lighting and costuming, and in its directorial treatment it has been brought to the audiences with extreme simplicity and sincerity. ... George Houston, a minor luminary of Hollywood, gives a portrayal of Everyman that should kindle a keen interest in him in the future. ... He gives a beautiful and dignified performance, shading from the greed and arrogance of a wealthy man, with his feasts and Paramour, to the humility and chastened spirit of a man who has been called by death. His scene in which he reads the Lord's Prayer is outstanding, for such a scene requires great skill if it is to escape accusations of mawkishness. ... Everyman is not a breath-taking spectacle, but it has a powerful cumulative effect."

=== 1936 book of the play ===
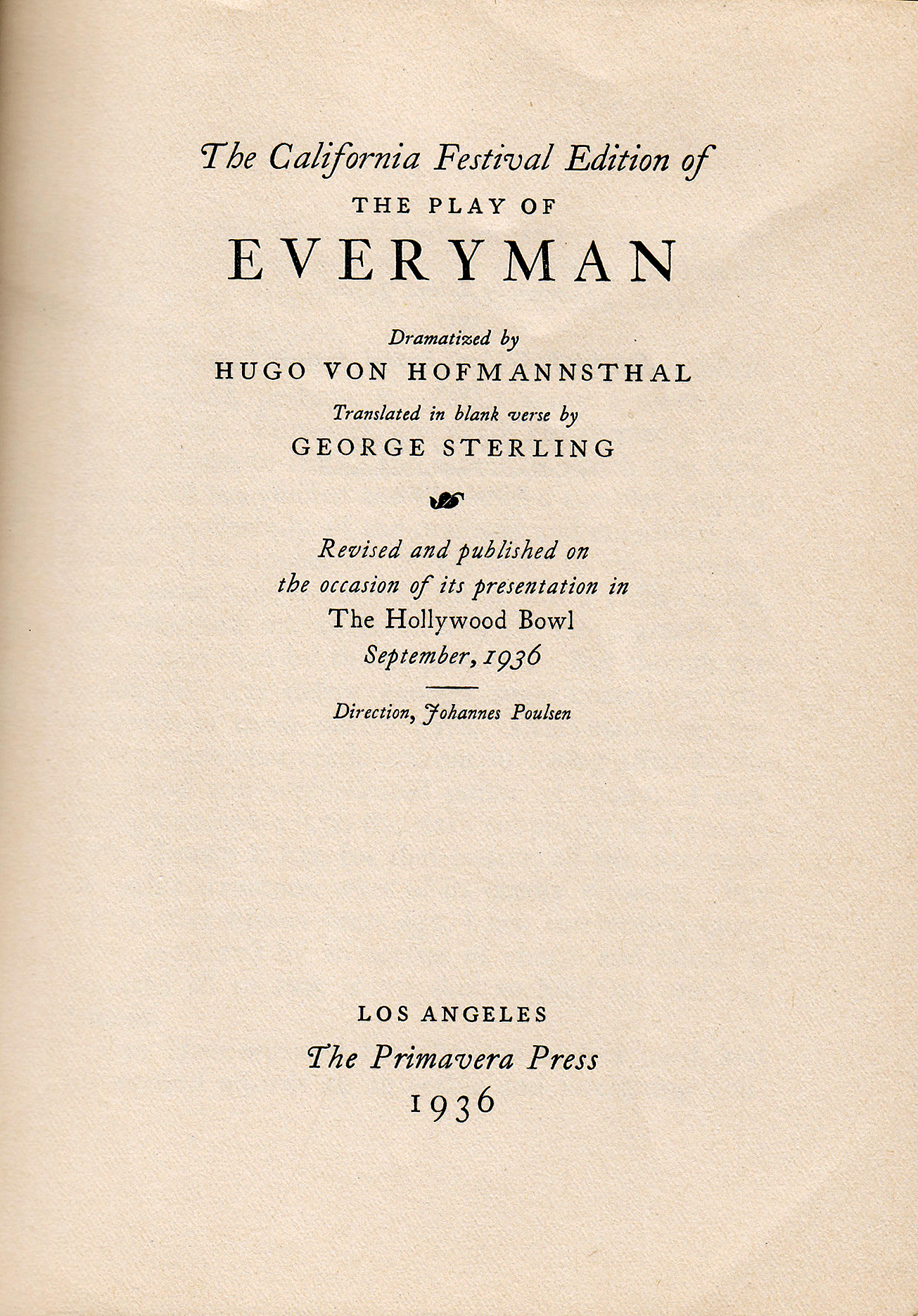
1936 title page of book The Play of Everyman by George Sterling, adapted and translated from Jedermann by Hugo von Hofmannsthal

5,000 copies were printed of a second edition of Sterling's play, making it one of the two best-selling editions of Sterling's writing ever published. (Sterling's other 5,000-copy seller was The Evanescent City.)

Because the publisher, the California Festival Association, wanted to sell copies only during performances at the Hollywood Bowl, it did not send review copies to book reviewers. Still, one syndicated review appeared in several smaller newspapers, showing reviewer Jane Archer's displeasure: "Certainly George Sterling was too good a poet to waste his talents on a work for which he was so obviously unsuited. In spite of the fact that we must read some version or another of Everyman at some time or another during our school career, it always was, and always will be[,] a dull affair. Though Shakespeare himself were to return from the grave, along with Keats and Shelley, and they all got together to do their version of it, Everyman would still be a bore."

=== 1936 characters and cast ===
Prologue – Moroni Olsen/Pedro de Cordoba
Lord God – unknown; possibly Harry Stafford
Death – Fritz Leiber
Faith – Peggy Wood
Good Deeds – Charlotte Evans
Devil – Vince Barnett
Mammon – Lionel Braham
Everyman – George Houston (originally Ian Keith)
Everyman's Mother – Mrs. Leslie Carter
Steward – Harry Hollingsworth
Cook – Scotty Mattraw
Friend – John Davidson
Poor Neighbor – Nigel De Brulier
Debtor – Lionel Braham
Debtor's Wife – Hedwiga Reicher
Paramour – Leone Sousa (Mrs. George Houston)
Thin Cousin [also called Little Fat Cousin] – Otis Harlan
Fat Cousin [also called Big Fat Cousin] – Lionel Belmore
Mother's Servant – Nigel de Brulier
First Servant- Remington "Remy" Olmstead
Premiere Danseuse – Ulla Poulsen
Premiere Danseur – Dimitri Romanoff
Buffoon – Arnold Tamon
First Maiden – Carroll Borland
Second Maiden – Muriel Goodspeed
Third Maiden – Mary Dean
Fourth Maiden – Zoe Mayo
Fifth Maiden – Faith Noble
Sixth Maiden – Lois Clements
Seventh Maiden – Travis Thames
Eighth Maiden – Anne Brooks
First Guest – Val Larson
Second Guest – Jack Anders
Third Guest – Daniel Lundberg
Fourth Guest – Joe Sullivan
Fifth Guest – Bob Grandin
Virgin Mary – unknown
Four Evangelists – unknown
Corps de Ballet – Wanda Allen, Iris Kuhnle, Helen McGowan, Barbara Perry, Maclovia Ruiz, and 44 others
Angels – June Eberle, Josephine Kamm, Beverly Knappen, Katrina Nies, Virginia Parenti, Dorma Parter, Rosalie Smith, Jean Wilcox, and 60 others
Archangels, Additional Servants, Additional Guests, Onstage Musicians, Soldiers, Saints – unknown

== Walter Firner's 1941 production ==
On April 12, 1941, the New York Daily News reported that Broadway and radio actors Walter Slezak, Stefan Schnabel, and possibly Frederick Tozere were joining to produce benefit performances of The Play of Everyman in the Friendship House Church at 1010 Park Avenue in New York City (today called the Park Avenue Christian Church). "The show will use refugee actors and be a refugee benefit," reported the Daily News. The cast would be a blend of professional American and Austrian actors—Austria have been taken over by Nazi Germany three years earlier. The production, the Daily News commented, would be "modeled after the annual Jedermann production always done at Salzburg, when there was a Salzburg."

A follow-up story announced that the "new refugee theatre group, the Theatre of Friendship House" would present the play Sunday, May 4. Additional performances were scheduled for Thursday, May 8, and Sunday, May 11, 1941.

The group recruited Walter Firner, former director of the Austrian Peoples' Theater in Vienna, to direct The Play of Everyman. In title role of Everyman, Firner cast Maurice Burke, an actor, singer, and dancer who had appeared in Broadway productions since the 1920s. The roles of the Lord God and Mammon were played by Stefan Schnabel, who although born in Germany, had been a member of The Old Vic repertory theater in England alongside Laurence Olivier for four years, and since 1937 in New York was one of the original members of Orson Welles and John Houseman's Mercury Theatre on Broadway and radio, including Welles' famous radio broadcast "The War of the Worlds". One of two angels in the play was performed by internationally famous Austrian soprano Judith Hellwig.

=== 1941 critical reception ===
Brooks Atkinson, the most influential drama critic of the time, reviewed the production in the New York Times. He was not impressed with Sterling's adaptation, nor with Firner's direction: "Like all European stage directors, he must have seen Reinhardt's celebrated Salzburg production more than once. What Mr. Firner has managed to do with lights, organ music, a beautiful chancel and a wide assortment of actors, may be amusingly naïve, but it conveys none of the wondrous faith of the original play. The words of the text are fearfully cultivated. The acting is modern and superficial. In spite of Maurice Burke's handsome and manly acting of Everyman, no one is likely to be frightened into piety by Mr. Firner's artful production. ... If Everyman is to stir theatre-going imagination today, it must be spoken in rude language full of Anglo-Saxon words and it must be acted in primitive style. It must smack more of the church than of the theatre. For it is not enough to act a religious play inside a church building. It is necessary to act with some of the reverence and humility that the church represents."

=== 1941 characters and cast ===
Lord God – Stefan Schnabel
Angels – Judith Hellwig and Clara Kwartin
Death – Theodore Goetz
Faith – Margrit Wyler
Good Deeds – Elizabeth Charney
Devil – Richard Odlin
Mammon – Stefan Schnabel
Everyman – Maurice Burke
Everyman's Mother – Eda von Buelow
Friend – Edwin Clay
Paramour – Cyrilla Dorne
Thin Cousin – Bert Bernd
Fat Cousin – Ludwig Roth
Steward – James Kent
Cook – Charles Kelley
Poor Neighbor – Paul Marx
Debtor – Marshal Reid
Debtor's Wife – Carol Johnsen
Guest – John Salter
Dancers – Anne Greenfield, Lavina Nehaus, Simone Moser, Ann Hutchinson

== University of California, Berkeley 1943 production ==
The University of California Little Theater presented The Play of Everyman on September 23, 24, and 25 in the 700-seat auditorium of Wheeler Hall at the University of California, Berkeley.

== Arthur Henry's 1977 production ==
The Village Church of Westwood Lutheran sits in the Los Angeles suburb of Brentwood, home to many people in the motion picture and television industries. For church activities, entertainment workers often create sets and costumes, and experienced actors, some famous, participate in church benefits. On March 16 and 23, 1977, Arthur Henry, pastor of the Village Church, joined with local theater group Theatre Palisades to produce two performances of The Play of Everyman at the church. Actor Fritz Feld had played a small role in Max Reinhardt's 1920 Salzburg production of von Hofmannsthal's Jedermann, and now served "as a consultant" to producer Henry and possibly played a role in Henry's production of the play.

== Impacts on participants' careers ==
- Before he wrote The Play of Everyman, George Sterling had little experience writing full-length plays, and not much practice using blank verse for poetic dramas. Writing The Play of Everyman helped contribute experience and confidence for Sterling to finish his long-stalled poetic drama Lilith—often called Sterling's masterpiece—and write his plays Rosamund and Truth. The Play of Everyman in 1917 brought Sterling in contact with the film community in Hollywood. Those meetings may have been a reason Douglas Fairbanks hired Sterling in 1924 to write screen titles for Fairbanks' fantasy film The Thief of Bagdad.
- Richard Ordynski wanted to direct operas for the New York Metropolitan Opera. Favorable reviews of The Play of Everyman helped him secure an agreement to direct the Met's March 8, 1917 world premiere of Reginald De Koven's The Canterbury Pilgrims, the first of more than 100 operas Ordynski would direct for the Met.
- Praise for twenty-year-old George James Hopkins' costumes and sets for the 1917 The Play of Everyman resulted in movie producers quickly hiring Hopkins to design motion picture sets, for which he eventually won four Academy Awards.
- Young Edward Weston photographed actresses from the 1917 production wearing Hopkins' costumes.
- Violinist and songwriter Victor Schertzinger had worked on only two films before his music for the 1917 The Play of Everyman gave him the visibility in Hollywood to begin an Academy Award-winning career as a movie director.
- Twenty-two-year-old Welsh actor Gareth Hughes came from New York to Hollywood to star as the main character Everyman in 1917. He made show business connections who helped him establish a film career two years later. After the Wall Street Crash of 1929 wiped Hughes out financially, the government's Works Progress Administration unemployment relief organization paid Hughes a tiny salary to work for its Federal Theatre Project, which put him in charge of producing and directing religious plays. The Federal Theatre acquired Father Clarus Graves' English translation of Peter Dorland's sixteenth-century Dutch play Everyman. In 1938 Hughes produced, directed, and starred in small 16-actor productions of Graves' Everyman throughout Southern California. Hughes left the Federal Theatre in 1939, was ordained as an Episcopal monk, and served for years as a missionary to Native Americans in a remote part of Nevada. While there, every year at Lent Hughes produced and starred in one performance of Graves' Everyman for his parishioners.
- Actor George Houston had appeared in only three minor movies before playing the title role in The Play of Everyman in 1936. Afterwards, a movie magazine captioned a photo of him: "George Houston's fine performance in stage play Everyman makes him a first line threat for stardom." More prominent in Hollywood, Houston was cast in films with Greta Garbo and Cary Grant and starred in eleven "Lone Rider" westerns.
- Kay Nielsen's designs of sets and costumes impressed Walt Disney when Disney attended the premiere of Thalberg's 1936 production. When animator and story artist Joe Grant asked Disney to hire Nielsen to work on Fantasia, Disney agreed. Nielsen worked for Disney from 1937 to 1941. He designed Fantasia's "Night on Bald Mountain" and "Ave Maria" sequences. Nielsen also contributed visual designs and story ideas for The Little Mermaid, a film project the Disney company did not complete until 1989. The 1989 animated film credits Nielsen as its "visual development artist".
