= Bernardusdal Abbey =

Bernardusdal Abbey was a house of Cistercian nuns originally established just outside Diest in the Duchy of Brabant, and later within the walls of the town itself.

== History ==
Arnold IV, Lord of Diest, and his wife Oda granted lands to the religious community in Webbekom on 22 June 1235, and later sold the abbey further local lands and rights. In 1238, Pope Gregory IX placed the community under his protection, in a papal brief that indicates the monastery's property to have been concentrated in Diest, Hélécine, Webbekom and Lubbeek. In 1246, Pope Alexander IV granted the nuns the right to bury outsiders in their church.

In 1266 Adelaide of Burgundy, Duchess of Brabant, confirmed a gift of lands to the abbey by Willem van Rikele, Abbot of Sint-Truiden Abbey. A further gift from Goswyn, Lord of Goetsenhoven, was ratified by the aldermen of Tienen on 19 March 1307.

The monastery was subject to canonical visitation by the abbot of St. Bernard's Abbey, Hemiksem, but on 24 August 1445 the Abbot of Cîteaux, Jean Vion de Gevrey, visited the community in person and decreed its membership be limited to 24 nuns.

In September 1507, during the Guelders Wars, the monastery was destroyed by troops from France and Guelders. Recovery was slow, with alms still being collected for rebuilding in 1533.

On 21 February 1578 the monastery was destroyed again, by soldiers in the service of William of Orange before their retreat from Diest. For thirty years the community had to find lodgings and financial support elsewhere, spending some time in Jean-Baptiste Gramaye's house in Leuven around 1601.

In 1607 Barbara Verwuest gifted her property within the walls of Diest to the community, and a new monastery was gradually established there. On 18 October 1663 they acquired land for a church, and the foundation stone was laid by Abbess Anna Rochelles on 3 October 1673. The church was consecrated on 14 October 1679 by Antonius Spanoghe, Abbot of Hemiksem. On 10 May 1686 the Abbess of Roosendael Abbey gifted two new altars for the church.

A little over a century later, on 16 Vendémiaire in Year V of the Republic (7 October 1796), the 20 nuns then living in the community were ordered off the premises by a government commissioner. The abbey was subsequently sold at public auction and the church demolished. The last abbess, Theresia Verbiest, died in 1802. The abbey buildings were later bought by the state and converted into an arsenal. What is left of the monastery's archive is held by the National Archives of Belgium.

== Abbesses ==
1. Clara Joden
2. Gertrud Bruyns
3. Margareta
4. Catharina Paul
5. Maria van Goetsenhoven
6. Anna Waffelaerts
7. Elisabeth Bruynen
8. Aleidis van Meerhout
9. Apolonia van Houthem
10. Odilia Molenpas
11. Margarita van Wemelinghen (was abbess for four years and then transferred to 's-Hertogendaal monastery, where she died in 1554)
12. Anna Schutkens (died 1548)
13. Margareta Coppaerts (died 23 August 1572)
14. Margareta vander Stockt (died 25 December 1580)
15. Catharina van Bree (appointed 1589; died 29 November 1606)
16. Gertrud Muyskens (died 8 February 1637)
17. Anna Rochelles (died 21 March 1676)
18. Maria van Croonenborch (died 24 April 1694)
19. Barbara Lelongue (died 6 September 1699)
20. Bernardina Heytmeyers (died 6 April 1705)
21. Gertrudis Reners (died 31 May 1706)
22. Anna Catharina Dierna (appointed abbess 21 June 1711)
23. Josepha Bertrand (abbess in 1730; died 7 October 1741)
24. Maria van Essen (appointed 1742; still abbess in 1785)
25. Theresia Verbiest (died 1802)
