= Anna M. Morrison Reed =

American poet and suffragist

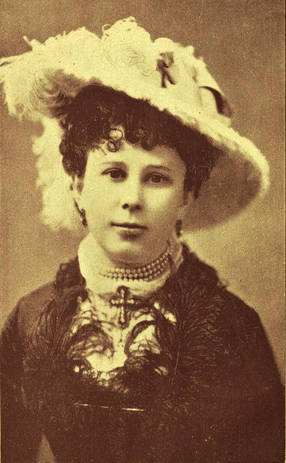
- Anna Morrison Reed (1896)
- Born: Anna Medora Morrison; 1849/50 Dubuque, Iowa, U.S.
- Died: May 23, 1921 San Francisco, California, U.S.
- Resting place: Laytonville, California
- Occupation: poet; lecturer; suffragist; newspaper editor & publisher; magazine editor & publisher
- Spouse: John S. Reed (m. 1872; died 1900)

Anna Medora Morrison Reed (1849/50-1921) was an American poet, lecturer, and suffragist, who for many years, was also the editor and publisher of a newspaper and a magazine. She was one of the most prominent literary women of the West in her day and was one of the best-known residents of Mendocino County, California, where she had resided for a great part of the time since 1872. Her associates included Gertrude Atherton, Bret Harte, Joaquin Miller, and George Sterling.

== Early life ==
Anna Medora Morrison was born in Dubuque, Iowa, in 1849/50. Her father was Guy E. Morrison, who mined near Oroville, California in 1850, after an ox-team journey across the Great Plains. A native of Missouri, he died in 1910 in Petaluma, California where he had resided for many years.

She came to California, in 1864, at the age of 15. She then started on a lecturing tour, traveling on horseback with her youngest brother through woods where trails were a matter of conjecture, and frequented by Native Americans, she visited practically all of Northern California.

Since the age of 15 years, she was a suffragist. When not engaged in writing, she was out on a lecture tour or campaign.

== Career ==
While still a very young woman, she engaged in writing and lecturing. She was married in 1872 at Marysville, California to John S. Reed (d. 1900), a part owner of the Black Bear mine, an important quartz gold mine in Siskiyou County, California. They had five children: Mrs. Edward Keller, Mrs. C. Stoner, Mrs. W. E. Travis, Mrs. W. E. Shattuck, and John S. Reed.

Shortly after their marriage, the couple came to Ukiah, California where John Reed engaged in business for several years, later buying what became known as the Reed ranch near Laytonville, California. Anna was very prominent in the civic and social life of the county and was identified with works that made for the county's progress.

For many years, she edited and published the Sonoma County Morning Independent, a daily newspaper. She sold the newspaper and removed the plant of the Northern Crown, a monthly magazine, to Ukiah, where she continued to publish the magazine up to the time that she was taken ill, six months before her death. She was a life member of the Pacific Coast Women's Press Association.

Besides writing for the press, she published between 1880 and 1896 various editions of her poems.

Among her accomplishments, Reed was noted as being the only woman to have delivered the state agricultural address, which she did at the state fair in Sacramento in 1893. She was called on to lecture before the Agricultural Association of Northern California; and was appointed one of the commissioners on the state board for the Columbian Exposition in 1892. Her organizing talents gave her the distinction of again being solicited to aid in raising funds for the Midwinter Fair of San Francisco the following year.

== Death and legacy ==
In her later years, Reed made her home in Ukiah, California until her illness necessitated her removal to San Francisco several months before her death. She died in that city, on May 23, 1921, after a lingering illness. Interment was in Laytonville.

Her grandson, John E. Keller, was her biographer; he published Anna M Reed: 1849-1921 in 1978.

Much of her literary output was preserved in the state library in Sacramento, California. Her poems were probably the better-known of her works.

== Selected works ==
- The Earlier Poems of Anna M. Morrison (1880) (text)
- The Later Poems of Anna Morrison Reed: In One Volume (1891) (text)
- The Latest and Later Poems of Anna Morrison Reed (1896) (text)
- Gethsemane: And Other Writings (1915) (text)
The earlier poems of Anna M. Morrison (1880)

The later poems of Anna Morrison Reed (1891)

The latest and later poems of Anna Morrison Reed (1896)

Gethsemane - and other writings (1915)

== See also ==
- Lilith (play): 1919 self-published paperback first edition
