= Leone Sousa =

American model and actress

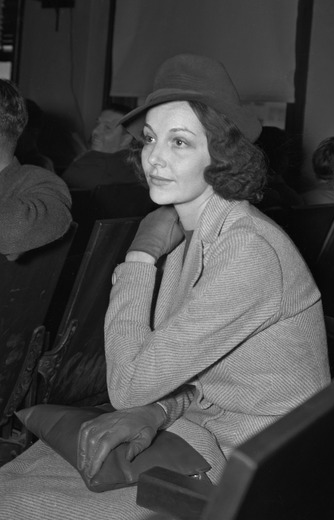
- Leone Sousa in 1940
- Born: 1909; Lake Elsinore, California, US
- Died: January 9, 2001 (aged 91)
- Occupations: Model and actress
- Spouses: George Houston (m. 1933; div. 1940) Walter Avellar (died 1964)

Leone Sousa (1909 – January 9, 2001) was an American model and actress.

== Life and career ==
Sousa was born in 1909 in Lake Elsinore, California to Mr. and Mrs. Arthur R. Sousa. She attended elementary and high school at San Bernardino, California. When she attended high school, her teachers failed her because they said she wasn't proficient in her sewing work, which came as quite a blow to her because she was making her own tailored suits at the time.

Sousa had an interest in amateur dramatics from a young age, and when she was 17 years old she left high school and went to Hollywood, California. She started singing in clubs in Hollywood and elsewhere in Los Angeles, and obtained extra parts in movies. Encouraged by her success, she went to New York, where she obtained work as a model while continuing her career as an entertainer. Sousa quickly became popular, appearing on the cover of several fashion magazines and in commercials. In 1931, Sousa was chosen by a committee of stylists as "Miss Fifth Avenue" out of the leading models from shops along Fifth Avenue. Later in 1931, she was chosen from a group of 60 models by French designer Gabrielle Chanel as one of 12 American girls to model her gowns in Paris salons. This event brought Sousa international publicity and led directly into her Ziegfeld Follies contract. In 1934, after returning to the United States, Sousa became a Ziegfeld Follies girl, and later in 1934, she was chosen by a group of New York artists as the most beautiful Ziegfeld girl.

Later in 1934, Sousa went to Hollywood, California again in hopes of becoming a movie star, but only ever got small roles and never had major success. As such, she soon returned to theatre. Sousa continued successfully with her career in the second half of the 1930s, but in the 1940s things didn't go as well for her. After, among other things, having performed for American troops in Europe during World War II, she left the entertainment industry.

Sousa had three husbands over the course of her life. Her first husband was actor George Houston, whom she married on September 8, 1933. Houston and Sousa performed together in multiple plays including the 1936 play Everyman. On February 21, 1940, Sousa divorced Houston, after they parted on November 1, 1939. On the day of the divorce, Sousa said in court that "He paid practically no attention to me. He'd go out socially without me and he wouldn't return until some time between 2 and 5 o'clock in the morning. [...] He was always having bills for champagne sent to our home. But I never saw the champagne." Sousa was awarded the divorce decree and Houston was made to pay her $200 a month in alimony until one of them died or Sousa remarried. In 1944, after their divorce, Sousa and Houston performed together in The Pilgrimage Play.

Sousa's second husband was a naval officer. Her third husband was Walter Avellar. In Avellar's later years, him and Sousa raised poodles and worked in real estate together, and they toured the country presenting their dogs at shows and participating in competitions until Avellar died in 1964. In Sousa's later years, she was asked if she was interested in making a comeback. At first, she was flattered, but declined when she found out that she was going to perform in a Las Vegas musical with and about other former showgirls, thinking it would be unsuccessful. However, the musical was still running when Sousa died on January 9, 2001.

== Stage work ==
Theatre performances
Year	Title	Role	Ref.
1932	A Little Racketeer	Show Girl	
1932	Cyrano De Bergerac	—	
1934	Ziegfeld Follies of 1934	"That's Where We Come In" Singer, Model's Guild Girl	
1936	Everyman	Paramour	
1938	Who's Who	—	
1938	Miner's Gold	Rory	
1944	The Pilgrimage Play	Mary Magdalene	
