= Lilith (play) =

1919 medieval fantasy play by George Sterling

Lilith: A Dramatic Poem
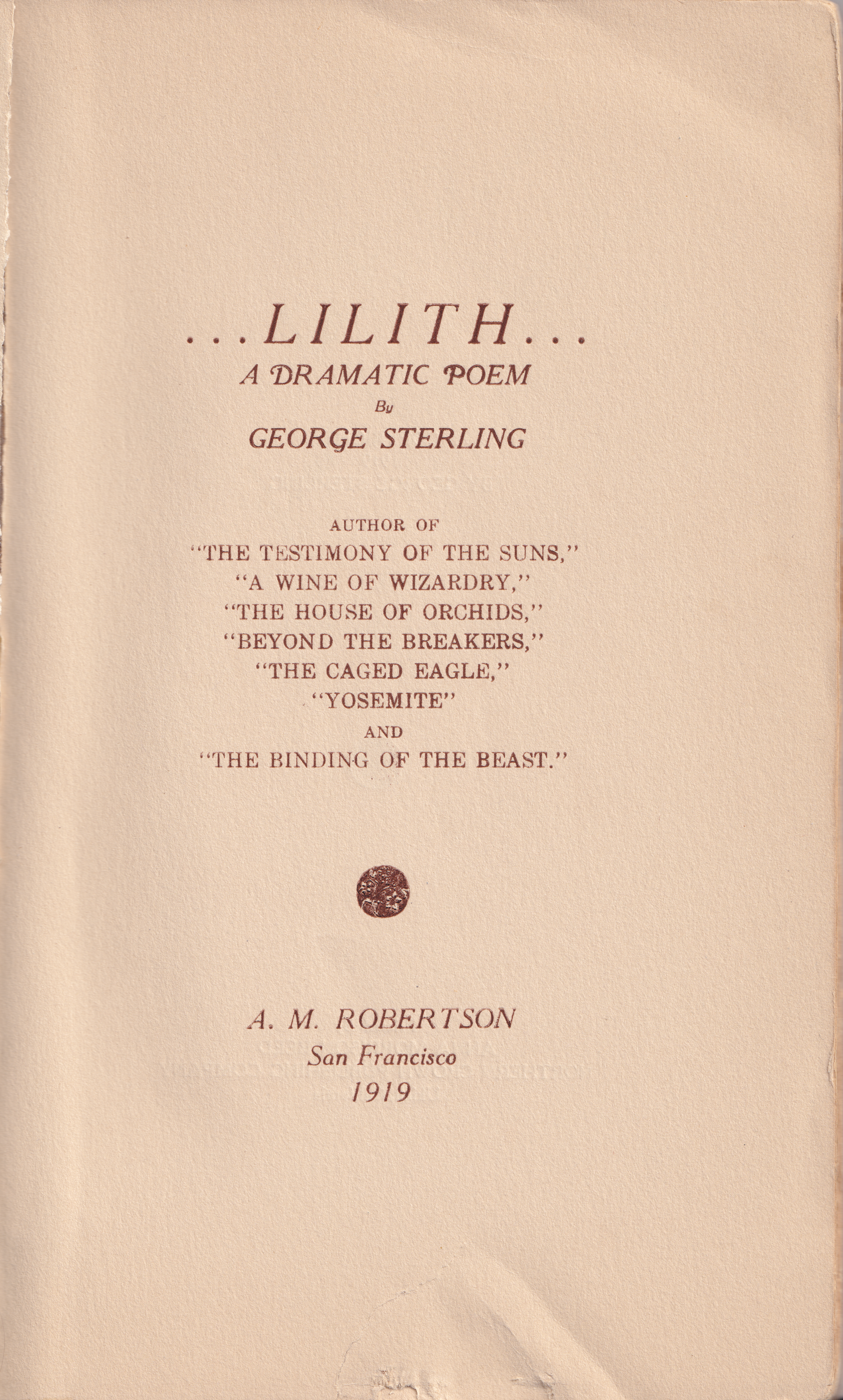
- Title page of 300-copy 1919 first edition of Lilith
- Written by: George Sterling
- Music by: Lawrence Zenda (pseudonym of Mrs. Rosaliene Reed Travis), Sara Opal Heron Search, John H. Densmore
- Lyrics by: George Sterling
- Characters: Men-at-arms, man-at-arms Leal, serving woman Berthe, troubadour, King Urlan, Prince Tancred, Lilith, Gavain, knight, wizard, Count Lurion, boy Ulf, shepherd Geoffrey, Amara, maidens, youths, cook, Odo the fool, Raoul the troubadour, Jehanne, King Gerbert, harpers, Archbishop Arnulph, Chancellor Foulques, lords, ladies
- Original language: English
- Genre: Drama, fantasy
- Setting: courtyard of a medieval castle in France; a garden-close of the castle; burial crypt of the castle; a white winding road ascending grassy hills; a mountain lake with a huge castle; a road leading to snow-capped mountains; a mountain stream and woods near a home; battlements of a castle; a banquet hall; a locked tower room; a fountain near a castle’s garden-close

Lilith: A Dramatic Poem is an acclaimed four-act fantasy verse drama written in blank verse by American poet and playwright George Sterling from 1904 to 1918, and first published in 1919. The New York Times declared Lilith “the finest thing in poetic drama yet done in America and one of the finest poetic dramas yet written in English.”

Author Theodore Dreiser said of Lilith: “It rings richer in thought than any American dramatic poem with which I am familiar.” Poet Clark Ashton Smith wrote: “Lilith is certainly the best dramatic poem in English since the days of Swinburne and Browning. … The lyrics interspersed throughout the drama are as beautiful as any by the Elizabethans.” Influential critic H. L. Mencken said of Sterling: “I think his dramatic poem Lilith was the greatest thing he ever wrote.” Thirty-four years later, in his book George Sterling, Thomas E. Benediktsson, agreed: “The allegorical Lilith is undoubtedly Sterling’s best poem.”

== Creation of the play ==
Lilith was the longest in gestation of all Sterling’s works. Sterling began Lilith on the fifth of September 1904, when he and his wife Carrie lived in Piedmont, California. In two afternoons he wrote the play’s entire first act. He didn’t have his first act polished enough to show his mentor Ambrose Bierce until six years later, in 1910.

At that point, Sterling doubted he could finish Lilith, so he put his draft away for seven years. Credit for reviving Lilith goes to Nebraska poet John Neihardt, best known for Black Elk Speaks. After Carrie divorced Sterling in 1914, he visited Neihardt’s home in Bancroft, Nebraska. Sterling told Neihardt about his unfinished Lilith, and Neihardt urged Sterling to work on it again. Sterling did not, so for three years Neihardt badgered him by mail, mentioning Lilith again and again until Sterling picked his play up again in 1917. Neihardt responded: “So at last it has come to pass that my Scipionic cry—Hodie, hodie, Lilith scribenda est! [Latin for “Today, today, Lilith must be written!”]—has had some effect? Hooray! It's the very best kind of news. If you had told me that your rich Uncle had just given you a check for a hundred thousand, I would have been but little moved. But I know now that you are most probably writing your masterpiece, and that it is a matter for rejoicing.”

Neihardt visited Sterling in San Francisco from late February through early March 1918. Sterling showed Neihardt his unfinished draft play. By this point, Sterling had acquired more experience writing plays in blank verse, including his well-reviewed The Play of Everyman. He completed a “rough” first draft of Lilith on April 3, 1918. “I have followed the main poetic (dramatic) tradition as to the form of the poem,” he later explained, “but have put more sheer beauty (I hope) into it than has gone into other American dramatic poems, for the reason that I was after more than drama. I made the poem moon-haunted, as a symbol of the illusory quality of love and idealism generally, and I ended it with a contrast between pleasure and pain as indicative of that strangest and most awful of human faculties, our ability to be happy when we know others are in agony. I can never forgive myself nor humanity for that. … I think that the poem, in its modernity as to astronomical truth, and its conception of pleasure and pain as the two realities goes deeper in thought than other American dramatic poems, for it does not take life as a bad joke, for pain demands more pity than that.”

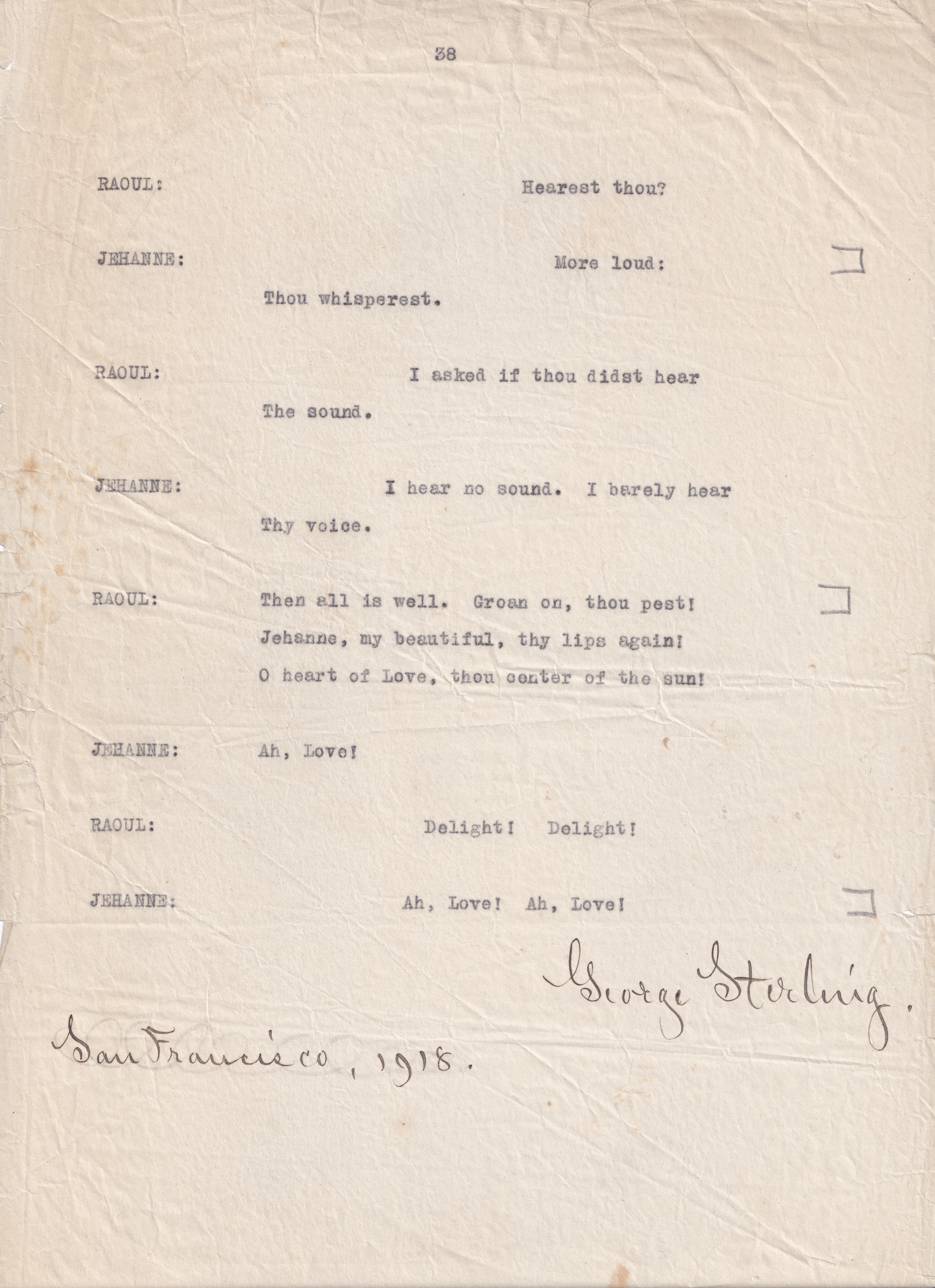
Last page of printers typescript of fantasy play Lilith, signed by George Sterling and dated San Francisco 1918.

Sterling completed a finished draft titled Lilith: A Dramatic Poem later in 1918 and sent it to potential publishers. He gave his original manuscript in gratitude to Neihardt, who responded: “I have read Lilith at a single sitting, and it was certainly a fine experience. Apart from the mood of the whole (which is of supreme importance) there must be no less than one hundred lines that are as bewitching as any in the Language.”

== Synopsis ==
Act One: In the garden-close of a medieval castle in France, King Urlan walks with his twenty-year-old son, Prince Tancred, speaking fondly of the king’s dead queen, Tancred’s mother. They come upon Lilith in a diaphanous green robe. Powerful lust overcomes both men. When asked her name, Lilith refuses to identify herself but says her sisters are Joy and Death. The king sends Tancred away and asks Lilith to become his queen. He promises to give her three chests of gems. She wants only one specific ruby. His dead queen wears that ruby. The king refuses and offers: “Take all else, and rule.” She refuses his offer. He threatens her with fire and torture. She says she cannot be restrained by manacles nor burned by fire and tells him to show his sword. The king unsheathes his sword, which Lilith touches, and his blade falls in fragments. He says he might give her the ruby. She says she will return tomorrow, turns, and disappears.

The next morning finds Prince Tancred and Lilith in the garden-close. He lusts for her, and she says her price is the ruby on his mother’s corpse. Tancred refuses. Lilith embraces him and he gives in. In the castle’s vast, dark, vaulted crypt, Tancred holds a torch and with Lilith searches for his mother’s tomb. They find it. Tancred lifts the silver lid and sees his mother’s corpse. He hesitates, but Lilith goads him and he takes the ruby. King Urlan appears and calls Tancred “traitor.” The two men and Lilith quarrel over the ruby. The men draw swords and fight. Lilith thrusts the torch in the King’s eyes, blinding him, and he is wounded by Tancred’s sword. King Urlan dies. Lilith takes the ruby and tells Tancred she will return in seven years.

Act Two: Seven years later, Tancred and his friend Gavain ride horses to a wizard’s cavern seeking forecasts of their futures. They do not like and cannot understand the wizard’s prophecies. Tancred and Gavain ride next to a lake. Tancred sings “A Song of Friendship.” They stop at the lake and strip to swim. Tancred swims to an islet with marble ruins where Lilth rises up from the water. They embrace, kneeling. Gavain shouts from the far shore. Tancred rises to go to him, but Lilith persuades him to stay. They hear Gavain twice more, but Tancred stays to embrace and kiss Lilith. Then she slips from Tancred’s arms, tells him his friend is dead, and sinks into the lake.

Act Three: Three years later, Tancred rides a horse up hills toward snow-capped mountains. He meets a shepherd, Geoffrey, who offers the traveler a place to sleep in his home. Tancred and Geoffrey’s daughter Amara fall in love. In the autumn of the next year, Lilith appears to Tancred. She persuades him to leave the shepherd’s home to find adventure. A week later in a wood they hear young women sing a dirge. The women are part of a funeral procession, with young men bearing Amara’s body. Tancred stops the procession and speaks of his regret. The funeral cortege resumes. “Tancred turns alone to the mountains.”

Act Four: Twenty years later on the wall of a castle in snow-covered mountains, a cook, Odo the fool, and Raoul the troubadour talk. Their King Gerbert has a new young woman, Jehanne, who might be a witch. They also distrust fifty-year-old Tancred, who has lived in the castle in “his narrow cell” for seven years, searching for wisdom. In the throne room, Jehanne—who is Lilith—persuades King Gerbert to invite Tancred to a banquet to interrogate him and see if he is a threat. Three days later, at a banquet, the king, Lilith, the archbishop, and the chancellor decide Tancred’s ideas are heretical and dangerous. He will be tortured and executed. The king’s men-at-arms take Tancred away.

Two days later, at midnight, Tancred is locked in a tower room. Lilith appears. She makes the tower walls and roof disappear, and debates with Tancred over what they see. She fails to persuade Tancred to change his views to save his own life.

The next midnight, next to a fountain in a castle garden, Jehanne-Lilith seduces Raoul. They hear Tancred’s groans of pain coming from a small, low dungeon window; he is being tortured to death. Raoul stuffs Lilith’s ears with rose petals so she cannot hear Tancred’s groans and the two have sex on the grass.

== Book publications ==
During Sterling’s lifetime, three editions of Lilith: A Dramatic Poem were published.

=== 1919 self-published paperback first edition ===
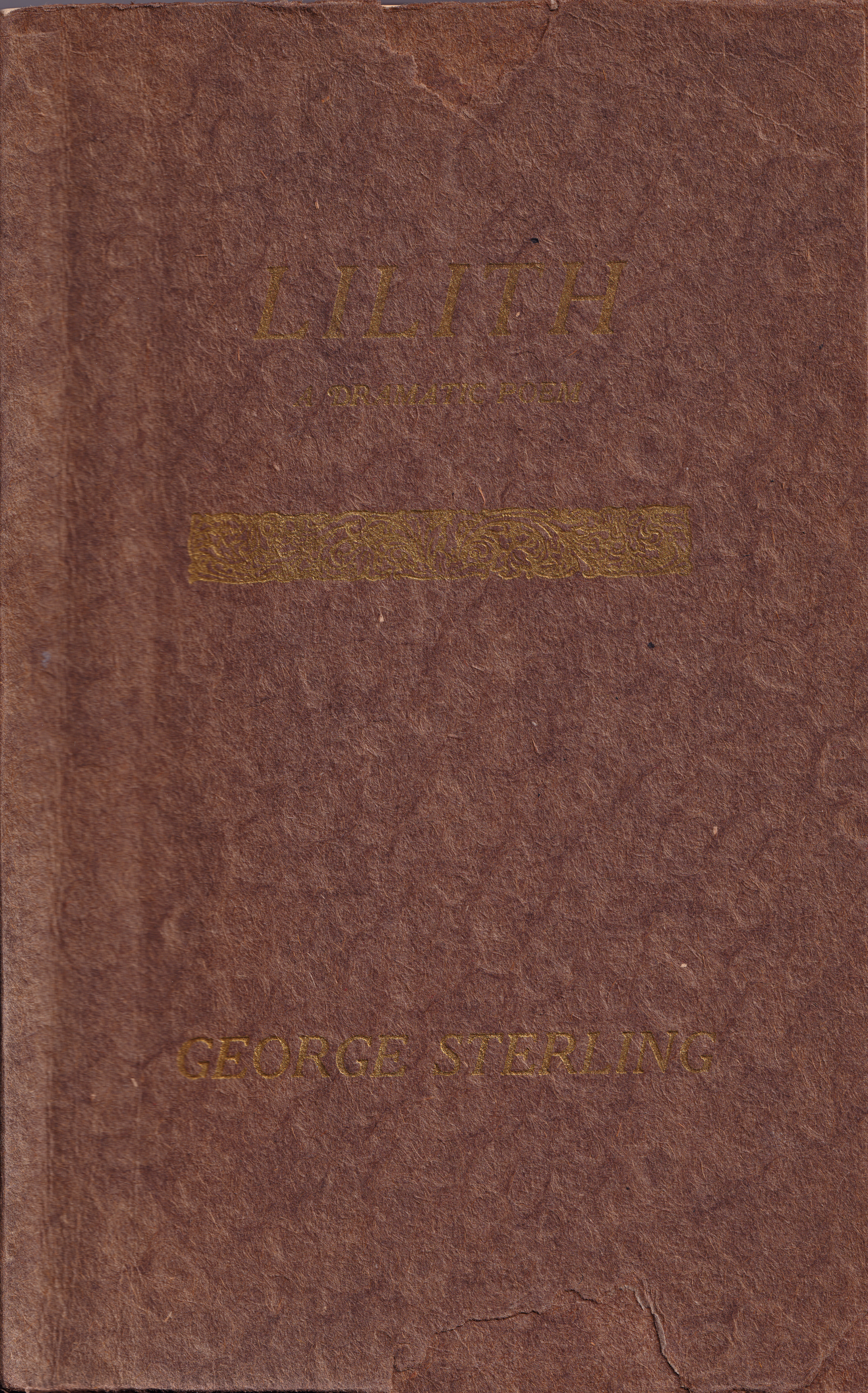
Hard-to-read 1919 first edition front cover of Lilith: A Dramatic Poem by George Sterling.

By April 1919, Sterling’s play Lilith was turned down by at least four publishers. He decided he would pay to print it. His lover and songwriting partner Mrs. Rosaliene Reed Travis suggested an inexpensive printer: her mother, Anna Morrison Reed. Sterling hired Anna Reed to print and bind his play. She regarded Lilith as “the most wonderful dramatic poem that has yet been written. I am proud to think that I have had something to do with presenting it to the world.” Sterling received his copies of Lilith: A Dramatic Poem in early December 1919. The first edition was limited to 300 softcover books. Sterling signed and numbered each one, and also hand-corrected twenty typographical errors in each book. Sterling gave away 150 copies of Lilith and turned over the other 150 to San Francisco bookseller-publisher Alexander Robertson to sell for him. They sold out in a week.

=== 1920 Book Club of California first hardcover edition ===
The directors of the prestigious Book Club of California were impressed by the play Lilith, but not by its first edition, deciding “the printing job was wretched and so full of errors that the Club’s edition was issued to give the dramatic poem a corrected text and a handsome and lasting format.” In 1920, the Club published the first hardcover edition of Lilith in a beautifully-designed 350-copy limited edition.

=== 1926 Macmillan hardcover edition ===
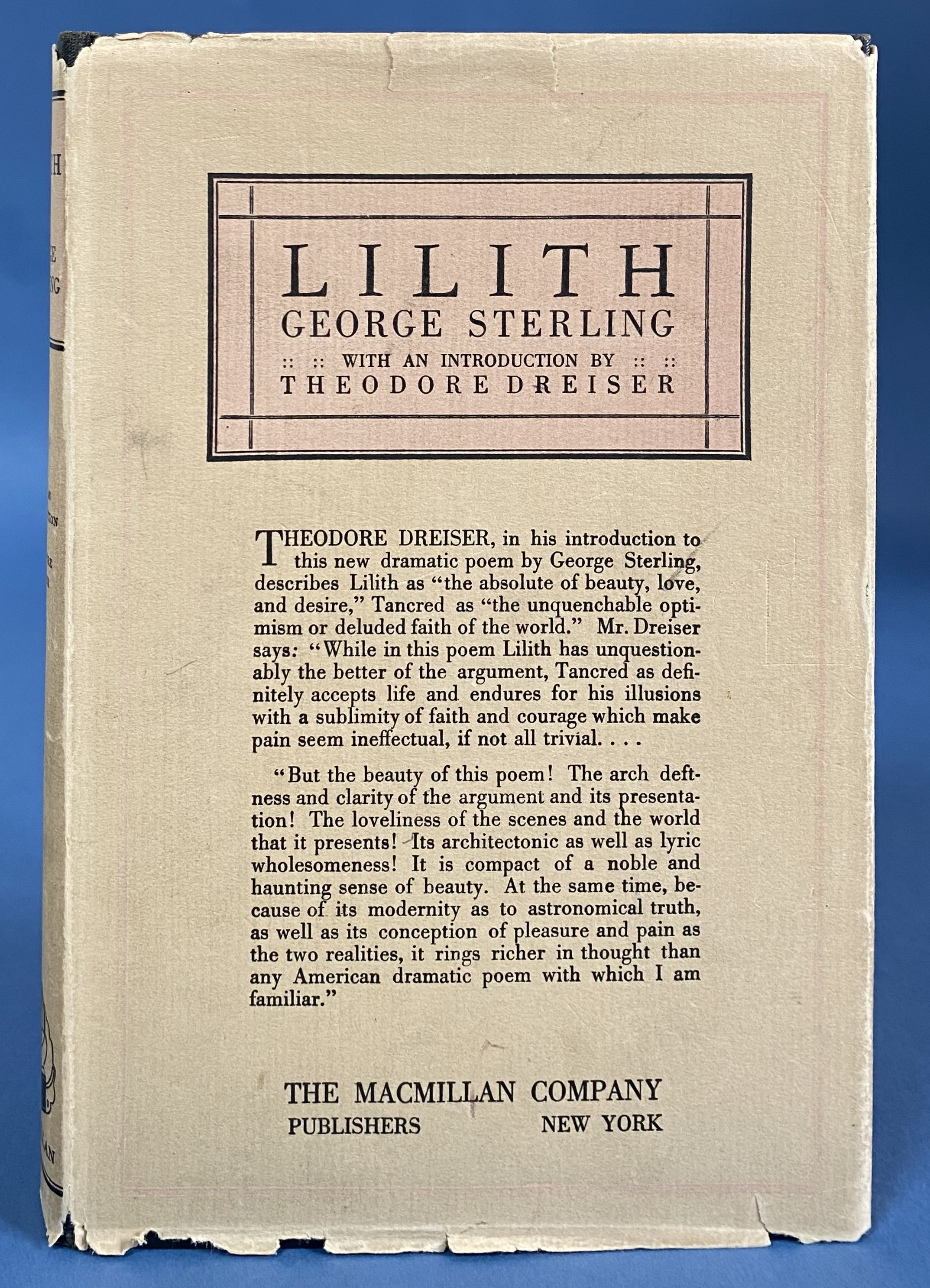
Dust jacket of 1926 edition of Lilith: A Dramatic Poem with quotation from Theodore Dreiser.

Six years later, New York publisher Macmillan Inc. published Lilith in hardcover with an introduction by best-selling author Theodore Dreiser, who wrote: “more definitely than in any play or poem I have ever read is presented the ensorcelling power of sex or passion which so persistently betrays men and women to their ruin. … It is compact of a noble and haunting sense of beauty. … It rings richer in thought than any American dramatic poem with which I am familiar.” Sterling believed using favorable quotations to sell books was undignified, but he did allow Macmillan to use a quotation from Dreiser’s introduction on the front cover of his book’s dust jacket—the only time in his life he ever allowed a quotation on the front of a book.

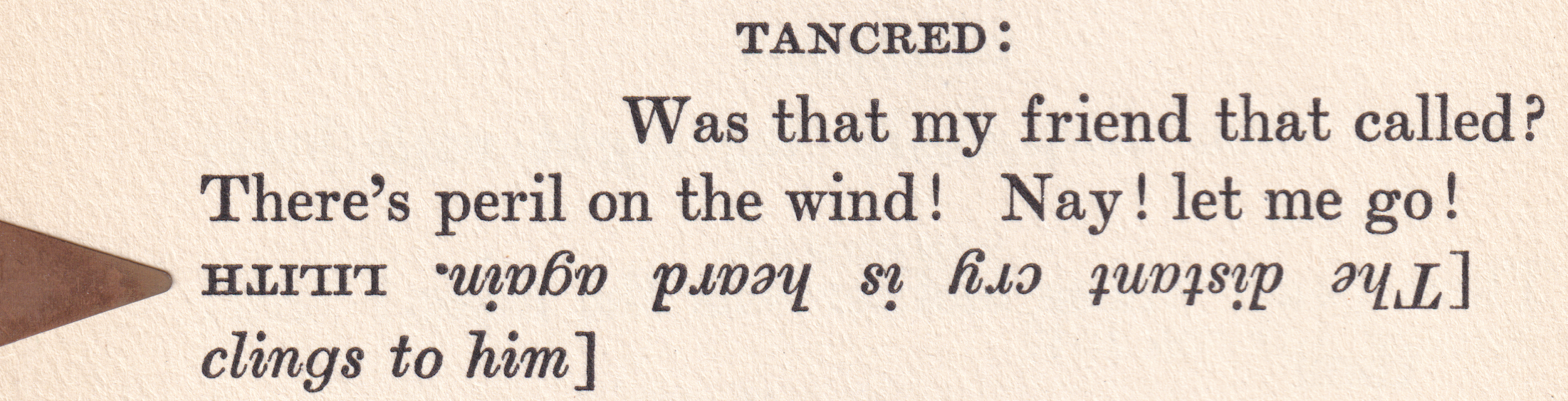
Upside-down stage direction on page 44 of 1926 edition of Lilith.

Only after the Macmillan edition was issued did someone notice that on page 44 a line of stage direction was printed upside-down. The publisher recalled all undistributed copies and cut out page 44 and page 43 (its reverse side). Macmillan then printed new pages 43 and 44 and hand-glued them into each remaining copy of Lilith. Approximately half of Macmillan copies are the uncorrected first state and half the fixed second state.

== Critical reception ==
In The New Republic, poet Léonie Adams hated the play: “Mr. Sterling is a veteran poet … but this grandiose effort betrays him to his worst side, to an almost wholly derivative verse, to all manner of rhetoric, the tawdrily pretty, the grotesque, the pompous.” Poetry journal Voices said Lilith "is of that most heinous of all possible things; it is—Shakespearean. Unashamedly a closet-drama, it gives vent to some of the most stilted and most inane outbursts of Elizabethan grandiloquence that we have witnessed for quite a long time. It is neither poetic nor is it modern." No other reviewer disliked the play so strongly.

The New York Times reviewer called Lilith “the finest thing in poetic drama yet done in America and one of the finest poetic dramas yet written in English.” Booklist, the journal of the American Library Association, wrote: “There are few recent dramatic poems which are so rich in substance as this one. Beyond the beauty of the scenes is the richness of the thought. The form of the poem is also a thing of beauty.” Saturday Review of Literature said: “Mr. George Sterling and the publishers are to be thanked for giving to the general public this deeply moving philosophic poem.” In Outlook, poet Arthur Guiterman pointed out that Theodore Dreiser’s glowing “Introduction” to Lilith might not be unbiased: “If you ask me, I think that Mr. Dreiser is a friend of Mr. Sterling, and that Lilith is an interesting dramatic poem or poetic play, containing passages worthy of Mr. Sterling’s deservedly high reputation.”

After Sterling's death, Australian poet Sydney Elliott Napier reviewed Lilith and concluded: "A perusal of it satisfies me that the great opinion of his work which is held by his contemporaries in the United States is justifiable. … In an appreciatory introduction by Theodore Drieser[,] he claims for Lilith that it 'rings richer in thought than any American dramatic poem with which I am familiar. … It is compact of a noble and haunting sense of beauty.' It is a great claim, but I believe it is a sound one."

== Not intended for stage production ==
No production of Lilith has been known to be staged. Even before Lilith was published, Sterling had interest from theatrical producers, but he talked them out of it. Sterling felt his play had too many sets and too large a cast to be produced profitably. Dancer Ruth St. Denis wanted to perform the play, but she asked Sterling to make major revisions. Her production never happened.

Author Upton Sinclair told Sterling Lilith was too long, and Sterling replied: “In the first place, it’s not too long: you must remember that it’s not an acting but a reading play; and it can all be read aloud in an hour and a half! … However, if the thing were to be acted, I should of course do some cutting, especially of the longer speeches. My friend Earnest Wilkes, who writes plays and has four theatres, wanted to produce Lilith, but I have refused to let him lose money on over-shooting the tastes of the public pig.”

The many settings in Lilith, its large cast, its special effects, and the musicians for its songs—factors which would make a stage production costly—seem appropriate for a filmed production, but to date no motion picture nor television version has been created.

== Songs from Lilith ==
Sterling included five songs in Lilith.

1. Act One, Scene 1: “Love Song,” also called “Troubadour’s Song.”
2. Act Two, Scene 3: “A Song of Friendship.”
3. Act Three, Scene 5: “Dirge.”
4. Act Four, Scene 2: “Harp-Song.”
5. Act Four, Scene 3: “Raoul’s Song.”

In addition to the songs’ publication as part of Lilith, the lyrics to all five were printed separately as poems by magazines and newspapers. Sterling selected all five to include in his 1921 book Sails and Mirage and Other Poems. Three composers set two of the poems to music.

=== Love Song/Troubadour’s Song ===
Sterling titled this song “Love Song” when printed in the body of his play Lilith, but often retitled it “Troubadour’s Song” when it was printed by itself as a poem. A year before the first book printing of Lilith, Ainslee's Magazine (one of the country’s leading literary magazines) published “Troubadour’s Song” as a poem. The Oakland Tribune reprinted it. 1926 “Love Song” sheet music combined Sterling’s lyrics with music by Tin Pan Alley composer John Hopkins Densmore, who had composed popular songs, Broadway shows, and the Harvard Band’s famous “Veritas March.” The Scranton Republican reviewed “Love Song,” saying: “A most expressive melody is Mr. Densmore’s vehicle for this lovely verse with a pungent and telling accompaniment. It is one of those service-wholesome songs that may be used on any occasion.”

=== A Song of Friendship ===
The lyrics to “A Song of Friendship” (one of two different Sterling songs with the same title) first appeared as a poem in Bellman Magazine a year before the book of Lilith was published. The poem was reprinted in the book The Bellman Book of Verse.

=== Dirge ===
The song from Lilith that generated the most attention was its funeral “Dirge.” Like all but one of the Lilith songs, “Dirge” was published before the Lilith book—in this case, a full year before, when the song first appeared in H. L. Mencken’s prestigious, rebellious Smart Set. Singer Mrs. William Elgin Travis (one of Sterling’s lovers, who composed music under the pen name Lawrence Zenda), quickly set “Dirge” to music. When Lilith was published as a book, “Dirge” was singled out in some reviews. One critic wrote: “The dirge of the maidens is one of the finest lyrics George Sterling has ever written. I have been privileged to hear it sung to the mournfully tender music written for it by Lawrence Zenda of this city; there are unshed tears in every line of it.”

In 1921, when Sterling included “Dirge” in his 65-poem collection Sails and Mirage and Other Poems, one reviewer named it one of the four best poems in the book. Two years later, Sterling again selected "Dirge" when New York publishing firm Henry Holt and Company asked him to choose from all the poems he’d written in his first 25 years as a poet to form a collection of his Selected Poems. Reviewing that book in the New York Post, poet and critic William Rose Benét said: “The dirge from Lilith is Greek in its delicate beauty.”

Two years after Sterling’s death, “Dirge” was placed as the first song in the 1928 edition of the sheet music collection Songs by Sterling and Zenda. Later, another former lover of Sterling, orchestral composer Sara Opal Heron Search, also set “Dirge” to music.

In 1933, when “Dirge” was reprinted in Wings: A Quarterly of Verse, critic and poet Stanton A. Coblentz cited “the consummate delicacy of utterance and the retrained feeling of the ‘Dirge’ from Lilith—a lyric so perfect that, if quoted at all, it must be quoted entire." In 1969, Charles Angoff, president of the Poetry Society of America, included “Dirge” in the Society’s book George Sterling: A Centenary Memoir-Anthology to celebrate the hundredth anniversary of Sterling’s birth.

=== Harp-Song ===
Outside of Lilith, the earliest known appearance of “Harp-Song” wasn’t until May, 1921, when it appeared as a poem in Pictorial Review, one of the leading women’s magazines, with a circulation of more than a million readers. “Harp-Song” was reprinted in the Sunday Boston Globe Magazine, in Alabama in the Anniston Star, and in England in Novel Magazine.

=== Raoul’s Song ===
The lyrics to “Raoul’s Song” were published in Ainslee’s Magazine as a poem seven months before the book Lilith was published. Except for Sterling’s 1921 Sails and Mirage and Other Poems (page 51), no other stand-alone reprints as a poem are known.
