= Everyman (15th-century play) =

15th-century morality play

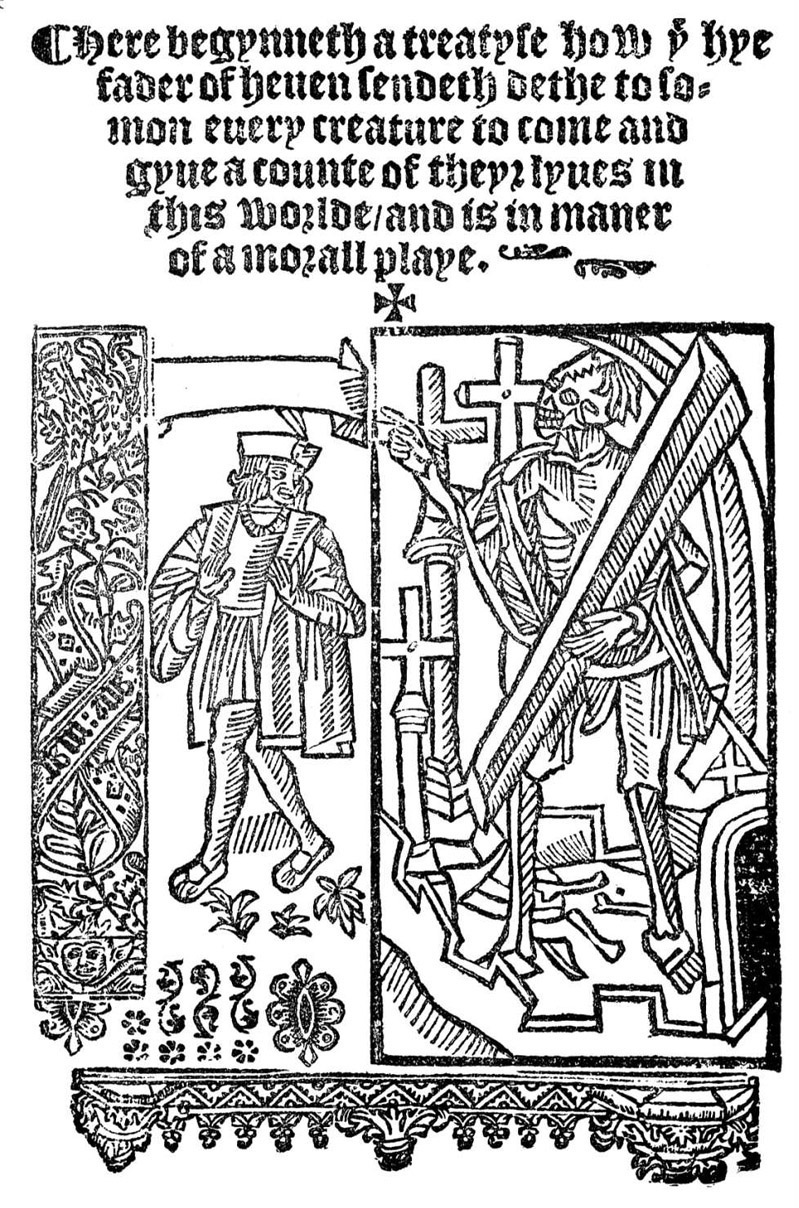
- Frontispiece from edition of Everyman published by John Skot c. 1530.
- Original language: Middle English
- Written by: unknown; anonymous translation of Elckerlijc, by Petrus Dorlandus
- Characters: Everyman; Messenger; God; Death; Fellowship; Kindred; Cousin; Goods; Good Deeds; Wisdom; Confession; Beauty; Strength; Discretion; Five Wits; Angel; Doctor
- Subject: Reckoning, Salvation
- Genre: Morality play

Premiere
- Date: c. 1510

The Somonyng of Everyman (The Summoning of Everyman), usually referred to simply as Everyman, is a late 15th-century or early 16th-century morality play by an anonymous English author, printed circa 1530. It is possibly a translation of the Dutch play Elckerlijc (Everyman), written about 1495.

Like John Bunyan's 1678 Christian novel The Pilgrim's Progress, Everyman uses allegorical characters to examine the question of Christian salvation and explain that Man must have a relationship with God to attain it. To develop that relationship, his strength, wisdom, senses, beauty and discretion are not helpful. The relationship with God is strengthened through his adherence to rules established by the Church – the partaking of the Eucharist, confession, penance, and participation in last rites, thus redeeming him and preparing him for eternal salvation.

== Summary ==
The play is the allegorical accounting of the life of Everyman, who represents all mankind. In the course of the action, God summons Death and directs him to take Everyman, who begs to be allowed to have help from his friends. Everyman tries to convince other characters (Fellowship, Kindred, Cousin, Goods) to accompany him on his pilgrimage to the hereafter, but all object to doing so and callously abandon him. Everyman at first is despondent at being abandoned, despite all the personified characters that were supposed necessities and friends to him, which ultimately do not lead him closer to Christ. His own personal attributes, including Knowledge, Beauty, and Strength, are kinder but also ultimately decline to accompany him, but Everyman learns that when he is brought to death and placed before God, his Good Deeds (which in the play include following Church practices of Eucharist, confession, penance and last rites) draw him into salvation with Christ.

== Sources ==
The play was written in late Middle English during the Tudor period, but the identity of the author is unknown. Although the play was apparently produced with some frequency in the seventy-five years following its composition, no production records survive. The play survives in four printed copies published around 1530.

There is a similar Dutch-language morality play of the same period called Elckerlijc, written around 1495 by Petrus Dorlandus, possibly a Latinized version of Peter van Diest. In the early 20th century, scholars did not agree on which of these plays was the original, or even on their relation to a later Latin work named Homulus. By the 1980s, Arthur Cawley went so far as to say that the "evidence for … Elckerlijk is certainly very strong", and now Davidson, Walsh, and Broos hold that "more than a century of scholarly discussion has ... convincingly shown that Everyman is a translation and adaptation from the Dutch Elckerlijc".

== Setting ==
The cultural setting is based on the Roman Catholicism of the era. Everyman attains afterlife in heaven by means of receiving the Catholic Sacraments, in particular Confession, Penance, Anointing of the Sick (Unction), and receiving the Eucharist.

== Synopsis ==
The oldest surviving example of the script begins with this paragraph on the frontispiece:

Here begynneth a treatyſe how þ^{e} hye Fader of Heuen ſendeth Dethe to ſomon euery creature to come and gyue a counte of theyr lyues in this worlde, and is in maner of a morall playe.	Here begins a treatise how the high Father of Heaven sends Death to summon every creature to come and give account of their lives in this world, and is in the manner of a moral play.

After a brief prologue asking the audience to listen, God speaks, lamenting that humans have become too absorbed in material wealth and riches to follow Him, so He commands Death to go to Everyman and summon him to heaven to make his reckoning. Death arrives at Everyman's side to tell him it is time to die and face judgment. Upon hearing this, Everyman is distressed, so begs for more time. Death denies this, but will allow Everyman to find a companion for his journey.

Everyman's friend Fellowship promises to go anywhere with him, but when he hears of the true nature of Everyman's journey, he refuses to go. Everyman then calls on Kindred and Cousin and asks them to go with him, but they both refuse. In particular, Cousin explains a fundamental reason why no people will accompany Everyman: they have their own accounts to write as well. Afterwards, Everyman asks Goods, who will not come: God's judgment will be severe because of the selfishness implied in the presence of Goods.

Everyman then turns to Good Deeds, who says she would go with him, but she is too weak as Everyman has not loved her in his life. Good Deeds summons her sister Knowledge to accompany them, and together they go to see Confession. In the presence of Confession, Everyman begs God for forgiveness and repents his sins, punishing himself with a scourge. After his scourging, Everyman is absolved of his sins, and as a result, Good Deeds becomes strong enough to accompany Everyman on his journey with Death.

Good Deeds then summons Beauty, Strength, Discretion and Five Wits to join them, and they agree to accompany Everyman as he goes to a priest to take sacrament. After the sacrament, Everyman tells them where his journey ends, and again they all abandon him – except for Good Deeds. Even Knowledge cannot accompany him after he leaves his physical body, but will stay with him until the time of death.

Content at last, Everyman climbs into his grave with Good Deeds at his side and dies, after which they ascend together into heaven, where they are welcomed by an Angel. The play closes as the Doctor enters and explains that in the end, a man will only have his Good Deeds to accompany him beyond the grave.

== Adaptations ==
A modern stage production of Everyman did not appear until July 1901 when The Elizabethan Stage Society of William Poel gave three outdoor performances at the Charterhouse in London. Poel then partnered with British actor Ben Greet to produce the play throughout Britain, with runs on the American Broadway stage from 1902 to 1918, and concurrent tours throughout North America. These productions differed from past performances in that women were cast in the title role, rather than men. Film adaptations of the 1901 version of the play appeared in 1913 and 1914, with the 1913 film being made with an early color two-process, Kinemacolor.

A version was filmed for Australian TV in 1964.

1917 Jan 5 Los Angeles Evening Express ad for world premiere of The Play of Everyman by Sterling

Another well-known version of the play is Jedermann by the Austrian playwright Hugo von Hofmannsthal, which has been performed annually at the Salzburg Festival since 1920, and adapted into film several times. Jedermann received an English language adaptation in 1917, The Play of Everyman. The 1917 adaptation was performed at the Trinity Auditorium in Los Angeles, followed by a run at the Burbank Theater in Burbank, California, and was translated and adapted by George Sterling with "Richard" Ryszard Ordynski and music by Victor Schertzinger. The Sterling adaptation was performed again in 1936 at the Hollywood Bowl with music by Einar Nelson.

Frederick Franck published a modernised version of the tale entitled "Everyone", drawing on Buddhist influence.

A direct-to-video film of Everyman was made in 2002, directed by John Farrell, which updated the setting to the early 21st century, including Death as a businessman in dark glasses with a briefcase, and Goods being played by a talking personal computer.

Jo Clifford's play Every One, a modern version of Everyman, premiered at the Royal Lyceum Theatre in Edinburgh in 2010.

In 2014, London theatre company Scena Mundi Theatre (then Little Spaniel Theatre) staged a production of Everyman at St Bartholomew the Great, a Church in the City of London. The play, directed by Cecilia Dorland, played on the church's medieval setting and kept the Middle English text intact. A strong ensemble piece using music and singing, it was very well received by critics.

A modernized adaptation by Carol Ann Duffy, the Poet Laureate of the United Kingdom, with Chiwetel Ejiofor in the title role, was performed at the National Theatre from April to July 2015.

In December 2016, Moravian University in Bethlehem, Pennsylvania presented Everyman on Trial, a contemporary adaptation written and directed by Christopher Shorr.

Branden Jacobs-Jenkins' adaptation, titled Everybody, premiered in 2017 at the Pershing Square Signature Center in New York City.
