= Martin Valvekens =

Personal life
- Born: 1604
- Died: 2 May 1682 (aged 77–78) Diest
- Notable work(s): Ortus, progressus et modernus status conventus Fratrum Minorum Diestensis

Religious life
- Religion: Roman Catholic
- Order: Franciscan
- Profession: 1628

Martin Valvekens (1604 – 2 May 1682) was a Franciscan friar and historian.

Valvekens was professed as a Franciscan friar in 1628, celebrating his jubilee of fifty years on 12 June 1678.

On the basis of papers left by Jean Verdonck at his death in 1672, Valvekens edited a history of the foundation of the Franciscan house in Diest, Ortus, progressus et modernus status conventus Fratrum Minorum Diestensis. This manuscript survived the suppression of the house, and was a source for F. J. E. Raymaekers's ecclesiastical history of the town, Het kerkelijk en liefdadig Diest (1870).

Valvekens died at the age of 78, having been a Franciscan for 53 years.

== Sources ==
- Jérôme Goyens, "Valvekens, Martin", in Biographie Nationale, vol. 26 (Brussels, 1936-1938), 108-109.
