= Peter van Diest =

Dutch writer

Peter van Diest (Latinised as Petrus Diesthemius) was a medieval writer from the Low Countries. The late-15th-century morality play Elckerlijc is attributed to him.

Elckerlijc, which was translated into English to become the famous Everyman, has come down to us in manuscripts that fail to mention the play's author. A 1539 Latin translation by Georgius Macropedius, however, states that its original author is one Petrus Diesthemius ('Peter of Diest'). Little else is known of this writer; he has been identified with the Carthusian monk Petrus Dorlandus (1454–1507), who lived in Diest (in present-day Belgium) and wrote lives of the saints. This identification and the writer's existence, however, is controversial among philologists.
