= Elckerlijc =

15th century morality play from the Low Countries

Elckerlijc (also known as Elckerlyc) is a morality play from the Low Countries which was written in Dutch somewhere around the year 1470. It was first printed in 1495. The play was extremely successful and may have been the original source for the English play Everyman, as well as many other translations for other countries. The authorship of Elckerlijc is attributed to Peter van Diest, a medieval writer from the Low Countries.

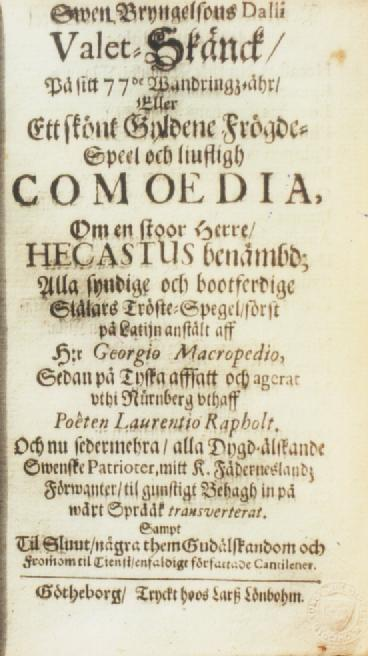
Swedish edition of Macropedius' Hecastus. Göteborg 1681. Courtesy of the Royal Library, Stockholm

The play won the first prize in a theater contest in Brabant; it is uncertain whether it won at the Antwerp Landjuweel in 1496. As a morality play, it stresses the didactic message. It uses allegory of the hero as an "everyman" (a typical human person) and is written in moderately elevated Rederijker style.

Dutch and English historians argued for decades over whether the English play Everyman was based on Elckerlijc (or vice versa). The most convincing evidence that Elckerlijc was the original was provided by the English historian E. R. Tigg, who showed how many rhymes and literal translations were copied from the Dutch language play into the English Everyman. On the other hand, an English translator should have added a rhyming tag to each of a pair of words that rhyme in Dutch but not in English. The prevalent view is that the Dutch-language version was the original.

== Translations and adaptations ==
- Everyman, in English (16th century)
- Homulus, translation in Latin (1536) by Christianus Ischyrius
- Heastus, adaptation in Latin (1536c) by Macropedius
- De düdesche Schlömer, adaptation in Low German (1587) by Johannes Stricker
- Jedermann (1911), Hugo von Hofmannsthal's German adaptation of Everyman
- Elckerlyc, 1975 film directed by Jos Stelling

== Sources ==
- Meijer, Reinder (1971). Literature of the Low Countries: A Short History of Dutch Literature in the Netherlands and Belgium. New York: Twayne Publishers. pp. 55–57, 62.
