= Alliot =

Alliot is a given name and surname. Notable people with the name include:

- Colette Alliot-Lugaz (born 1947), French soprano
- Lucien Alliot (1877–1967), French sculptor
- Maurice Alliot (1903–1960), French Egyptologist
- Michèle Alliot-Marie (born 1946), French politician
- Philippe Alliot (born 1954), French racing driver
- Alliot Verdon Roe (1877–1958), pioneer English pilot, founder of the Avro company

== See also ==
- Aleotti
- Alioto
- Aliotta
- Aliotti
