= July 1901 =

Month in 1901

<<	July 1901					>>
Su	Mo	Tu	We	Th	Fr	Sa
	1	2	3	4	5	6
7	8	9	10	11	12	13
14	15	16	17	18	19	20
21	22	23	24	25	26	27
28	29	30	31

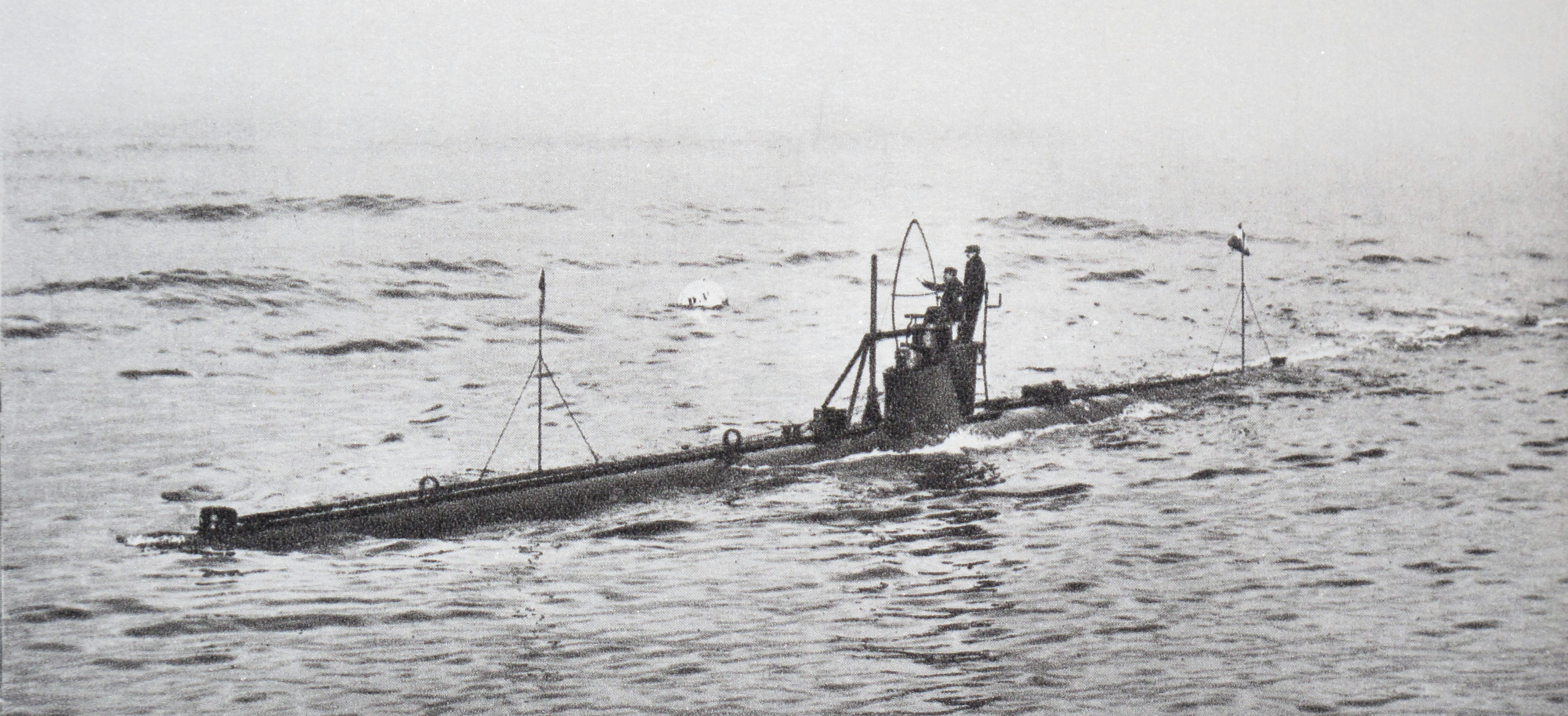
July 5, 1901: French submarine Gustave Zédé sneaks up on warship, stuns the world

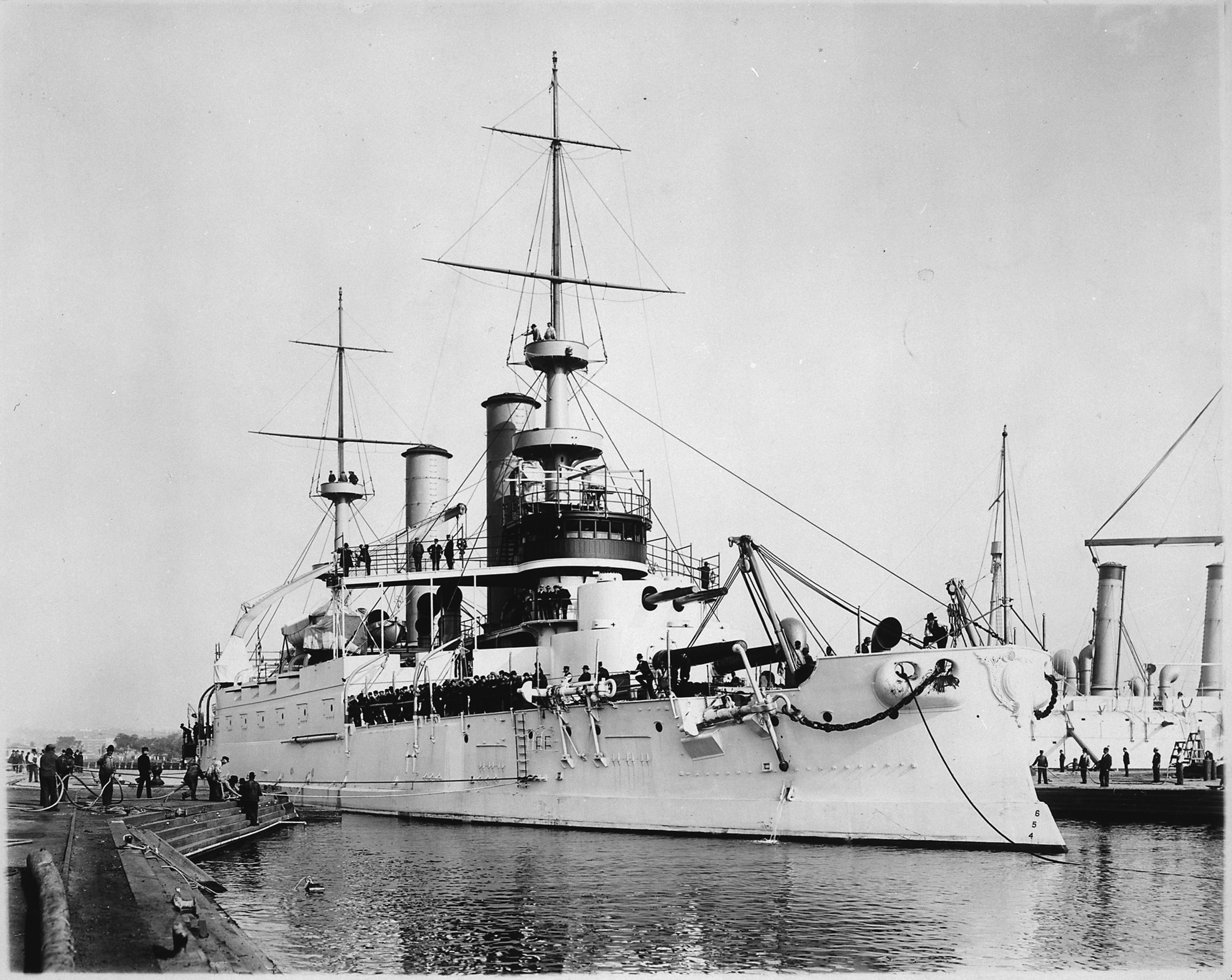
July 24, 1901: USS Kearsarge bombs Newport City Hall

The following events occurred in July 1901:

== July 1, 1901 (Monday) ==
- The British and Japanese sections of Beijing were formally restored to the control of Imperial China.
- In Germany, the Versicherungsaufichtsgesetz (the Act on Supervision of Insurance Companies) went into effect, regulating private insurance companies for the first time. The Act, passed on May 12, was modeled on similar provisions in Austria-Hungary, Switzerland, and several individual states in the United States.
- France's "Law on Associations" took effect, requiring that any associations in France had to be "composed of French citizens without foreign obligations". Championed by Prime Minister Pierre Waldeck-Rousseau, the 1901 law had its strongest effect on French members of the Catholic Church, since it had obligations to the Vatican in Rome. "Ultimately," a historian would write, "12,000 Catholic schools were closed, and 50,000 members of religious orders were dispersed."
- The last issue of Le Moniteur Universel, which had been the official newspaper of the French government from 1789 until 1871, was published. In the thirty years since becoming a private publication, its circulation had gradually declined.
- In the Lake View section on Chicago's north side, a bolt of lightning killed four men and seven boys who had taken refuge from the rain in a zinc-covered shed near the Robbins Pier. The youngest victim was an 11-year-old boy, while two others were 12 years old.

== July 2, 1901 (Tuesday) ==
- Coroners' offices reported 225 heat-related deaths in a single day in New York City and its suburbs as temperatures of 98° continued, the day after 96 people there had died from the "hot wave". Fifty deaths each were reported in Philadelphia and Pittsburgh. The death toll the day before in New York had been 96, and, in the days before air-conditioning, thousands of tenement dwellers "brought their mattresses from inside the houses and camped in the street" and 250 horses died. On July 3, New York lost 188 people, and Philadelphia another 59, even as temperatures began to drop.

== July 3, 1901 (Wednesday) ==
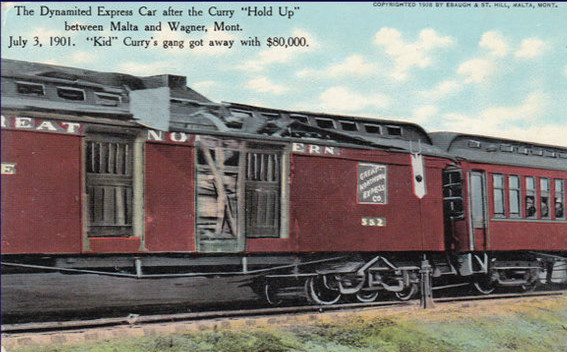
The Wild Bunch's last train robbery

- American outlaw Kid Curry (Harvey Logan) and the remaining members of The Wild Bunch pulled off a train robbery of the Great Northern Flyer. Curry and Ben Kilpatrick boarded the train at Malta, Montana, as passengers, rode for seven miles, and as the train approached Exeter Switch near the town of Wagner, Logan left his seat, walked to the front of the train, climbed over into the engineer's cab, pulled out his two six-guns, and ordered the men to stop. After it halted, the train was boarded by O. C. "Deaf Charley" Hanks and Laura Bullion, who had been waiting at the switch. Breaking into the express car, they dynamited a safe that was carrying $40,000 worth of bank notes (the equivalent of almost $1.1 million in 2016) that was being transported to the Montana National Bank in Montana. Some accounts place Butch Cassidy at the scene, while other historians conclude that Cassidy had already departed the United States on a ship bound for Argentina.
- A district judge in Omaha declined to continue an injunction and cleared the way for the first ever exhibition of the sport of bullfighting in Nebraska, to take place on July 4. Although the filers of the suit cited the state law against animal cruelty, the organizers noted that "the picadores are to be without real lances, the chulos without real banderillos and the matador without a real sword", since the instruments "are to be imitated in soft pine and papier mache." Judge Jacob Fawcett commented that "he was satisfied that the bull fights will not present one-tenth of the brutality that is to be witnessed on a football field."
- Born:
  - Ruth Crawford Seeger, American composer, in East Liverpool, Ohio (d. 1953)
  - Thelma Wood, American sculptor, in Kansas (d. 1970)

== July 4, 1901 (Thursday) ==
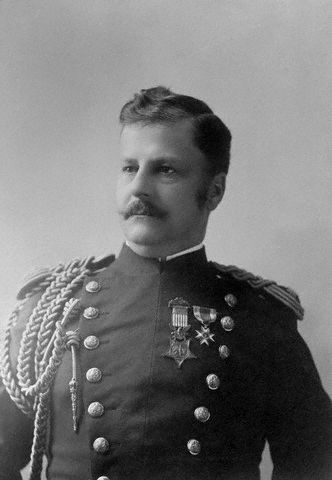
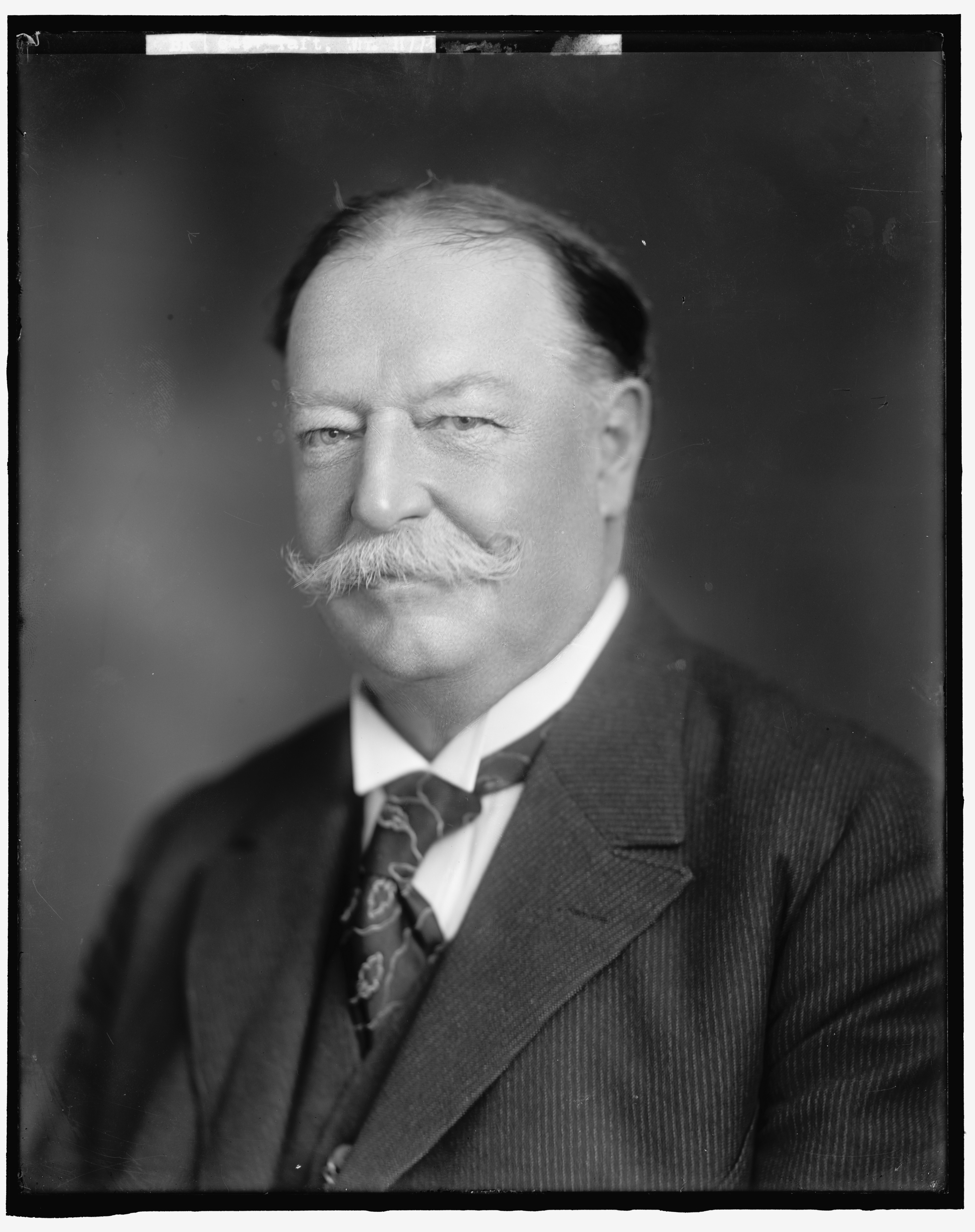
General MacArthur turns control over to Taft
- Future U.S. President William Howard Taft was sworn in as the Governor-General of the Philippines in a ceremony at Cathedral Plaza in Manila coincided with 125th anniversary of the independence of the U.S., where General Arthur MacArthur formally transferred his authority as Military Governor to Taft's civilian government. MacArthur transferred his command of American troops in the Philippines to Major General Adna Chaffee. In his address, Governor-General Taft announced that the Philippine Commission that served as legislature would include three new Filipino members on September 1. As Taft took office, 22 of the 27 organized Philippine provinces were at peace, while the insurrection continued in five and 16 had not yet been organized.
- The longest covered bridge in the world, the 1,282-foot (390 m) span over the Saint John River at Hartland, New Brunswick, was opened.
- Died:
  - John Fiske, 59, American philosopher (b. 1842)
  - Johannes Schmidt, 58, German linguist (b. 1843)
  - Peter Tait, 70, Scottish physicist and pioneer in the study of thermodynamics (b. 1831)

== July 5, 1901 (Friday) ==
- The French Navy submarine Gustave Zédé stunned the naval world by demonstrating its potential to sneak up upon and sink even the most powerful of surface ships. The occasion was exercises of the French Mediterranean Fleet; the Gustave Zédé traveled 160 miles under its own power, moved undersea into Ajaccio harbor on the island of Corsica, and struck the Fleet's flagship, the Charles Martel, with a dummy torpedo. "The successful 'sinking' of a fully protected battleship by a tiny submarine which could approach its target, deliver a lethal blow and escape without being detected," a historian would write later, "was a watershed in the history of submarines and was an object lesson to the naval planners of all major countries in the changes that were going to be wrought into the future shape of sea power."
- The Metropolitan Museum of Art in New York City received its largest contribution up to that time, as the beneficiary of $5,750,000 or more, representing nearly all of the estate of the late Jacob S. Rogers, a locomotive manufacturer and philanthropist. Only $250,000 total was left to eight relatives.
- Born: Len Lye, New Zealand-American kinetic sculpture artist and filmmaker, in Christchurch (d. 1980)

== July 6, 1901 (Saturday) ==
- Canadian sportsman John Voss and freelance journalist Norman Luxton departed from Vancouver to begin a cruise around the world on the Tilikum, a 38-foot long dugout canoe that had been carved by Nuu-chah-nulth tribesmen from the trunk of a cedar tree. Voss and Luxton modified the canoe by raising its sides, installing a deck, adding support, and installing a keel, a rudder, a cabin, a cockpit, and sails. Luxton would depart after sustaining an injury on a reef in the South Pacific. After the boat reached South Africa in 1902, Voss would abandon the circumnavigation attempt, sailing along the Atlantic coast of South America for refitting in Brazil, rather than attempting to reach the Pacific Ocean. He would end his adventure in October, 1904, sailing the Tilikum up the River Thames into London.
- Born:
  - Marshal Pavel Rotmistrov, Soviet commander of armored troops during World War II (d. 1982)
  - Syama Prasad Mukherjee, Indian politician, founder of the right wing nationalist party Bharatiya Jana Sangh in 1951, in Calcutta (d. 1953)
  - Philip Wheelwright, American philosopher, in Elizabeth, New Jersey (d. 1970)
- Died:
  - Prince Chlodwig, Prince of Hohenlohe, 82, Chancellor of Germany from 1894 to 1900 (b. 1819)
  - William J. Stillman, 73, American war correspondent and former U.S. Ambassador to Italy (b. 1828)
  - Joseph LeConte, 78, American geologist and physician who co-founded the Sierra Club conservation society (b. 1823)

== July 7, 1901 (Sunday) ==
- U.S. President William McKinley proclaimed the opening to settlers of particular Indian territories in the Oklahoma Territory, including the Creek Nation, effective August 6.
- Born:
  - Vittorio De Sica, Italian film director and actor, three-time recipient of the Academy Award for Best Foreign Language Film, in Lazio, Italy (d. 1974)
  - Sam Katzman, American B-movie film director and producer, best known for Earth vs. the Flying Saucers and the Jungle Jim series, in New York City (d. 1973)
- Died:
  - Pierre Lorillard IV, 67, American tobacco manufacturer and millionaire (b. 1833)
  - Johanna Spyri, 74, Swiss writer best known for creating the 1880 children's book Heidi (b. 1827)

== July 8, 1901 (Monday) ==
- The House of Lords ruled that the United Kingdom had no jurisdiction in overturning a decision by a foreign court that had acted in accordance with the foreign nation's laws. The case in question involved the 1897 seizure of the British freighter S.S. Baluchistan by the Sultanate of Muscat and Oman, and the confiscation of its cargo of 280 cases of rifles and 306 cases of cartridges, being shipped to Persia. Exercising their judiciary power, the Lords concluded that the seizure was legal under the laws of Muscat, which had outlawed the supply of arms to Islamic rebels.
- An attempt was made to assassinate Reginald Wingate, the British Governor-General of the Sudan, when his train was derailed in Egypt at Damanhur as he approached Alexandria. Wingate was able to escape unharmed, and the saboteurs of the rail line were never found.
- The Texas Legislature voted an extensive reorganization and reduction of the Texas Rangers state police force, eliminating the "Frontier Battalion" and consolidated the organization into four companies of no more than 21 members. However, the initial budgeting allowed for only eight rangers and a sergeant for each division.
- My Brilliant Career, the first novel by Australian author Miles Franklin, was first published. In 1979, 25 years after her death, her book would be adapted to a film of the same name.
- Texas entrepreneur John Henry Kirby chartered the largest lumber manufacturer in the world, Kirby Lumber Company, and one of the largest oil producers in the world at that time, the Houston Oil Company, on the same day.
- Born: Paul David Devanandan, Indian Christian theologist and pioneer in comparative religion dialogues, in Madras (d. 1962)

== July 9, 1901 (Tuesday) ==
- Pope Leo gave formal approval from the Catholic Church on the Institutum Iosephitarum Gerardimonensium, an institution that had been founded in 1817 and that is commonly referred to as the "Sons of Saint Joseph" or "Josephites of Belgium".
- Born:
  - Barbara Cartland, best-selling English romance novelist, as Mary Barbara Hamilton, in Edgbaston, England (d. 2000)
  - Jester Hairston, African-American songwriter, in Belews Creek, North Carolina (d. 2000)

== July 10, 1901 (Wednesday) ==
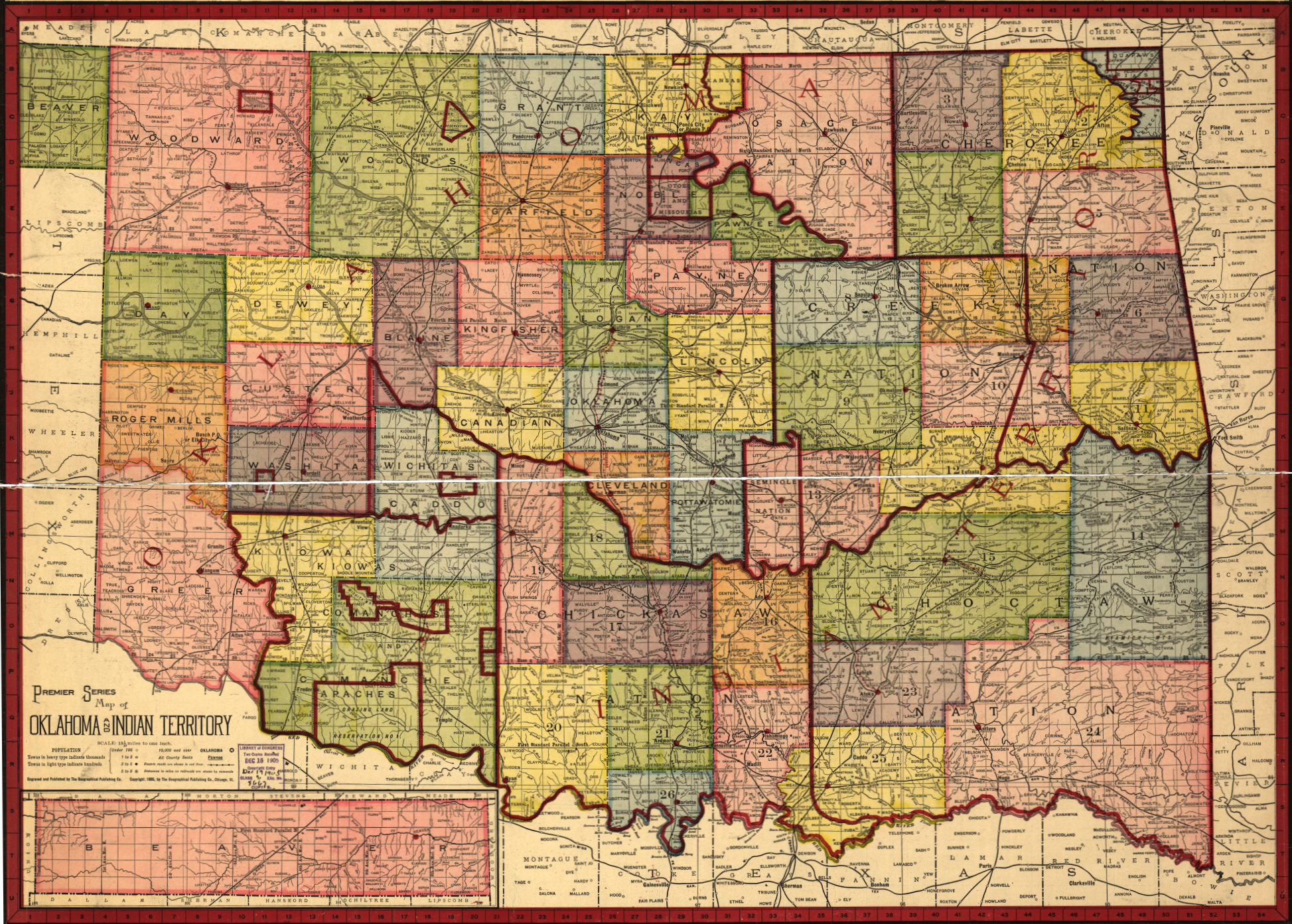
Oklahoma for sale

- Registration opened for the Oklahoma Territory land lottery at 9:00 in the morning at two United States Department of the Interior offices, located at El Reno and at Lawton. When the registration closed at 6:00 p.m. on Friday, July 26, there were 167,000 people who had spent the $25 registration fee to be eligible for one of 13,000 tracts of land of 160 acres each, with drawing to begin on July 29. Each of the 13,000 winners whose ticket was drawn would have the opportunity to buy their tract from the government for two hundred dollars ($1.25 per acre) or to agree to pay $2.50 an acre over a 14-month period.
- Cole Younger and his younger brother, Jim Younger, were granted parole after almost 25 years in the Minnesota State Prison in Stillwater, Minnesota. On September 7, 1876, the brothers, along with Jesse James and Frank James, had attempted to rob a bank in Northfield, and while the James brothers were able to escape, Cole and Jim and Bob Younger had ended up in prison (where Bob died in 1889). On July 24, it was reported that the first post-incarceration job for the two men would be in Saint Paul selling tombstones.
- London's first electric streetcar service was inaugurated. A 15 mile long section of the electric tramway line, operated by London United Tramways and located in West London, was dedicated by Lord Rothschild.
- Nineteen people were killed in the collision of two trains in Missouri, on the Chicago & Alton Railroad line. The southbound Chicago and Alton No. 7 train collided head on with a livestock train, setting both ablaze, and scalding many of the riders with steam.
- A brigade of 3,000 Imperial Chinese troops was defeated at Chichou, 40 miles southeast of Paotingfu, by the fighters for the Allied Villagers' Society.
- Born: Eiji Tsuburaya, Japanese science fiction film director and co-creator of the Godzilla film series, in Sukagawa, Fukushima, Japan (d. 1970)
- Died: Martha Johnson Patterson, 72, daughter of former U.S. President Andrew Johnson, and acting First Lady of the United States from 1865 to 1869 because of the chronic illness of her mother.

== July 11, 1901 (Thursday) ==
- Léon Gaumont applied for a patent for the Chronophone, his invention for presenting motion pictures with sound, with a projector (a Chrono-Bioscope or cinematograph) and a phonograph (the Cyclophone) being synchronized "by two coupled electrical motors, with the phonograph determining the speed". The system would be demonstrated on November 7, 1902, using three films but was not reliable because vibrations from the cinematograph made the picture move more slowly than the sound.
- The government of Bolivia entered an agreement with a jointly owned American and British company called the "Bolivian Syndicate", granting tax exemptions, free navigation of rivers (including the Amazon River), and the right to maintain railroads, electric power plants and a police force in a disputed border area, the Acre territory. The boundaries of the land leased to the Syndicate were its border with Brazil (which also claimed the Acre territory), its border with Peru, and the Abuna River. The agreement would reopen the "Acre War" between Brazil and Bolivia, and on August 8, 1902, the Brazilian Navy would begin turning back any boats on the Amazon River that were traveling to or from Bolivia; the dispute would finally be settled by a treaty on November 17, 1903, with Bolivia relinquishing most of the Acre Territory to Brazil.
- Seven construction workers and two railroad employees were killed near Conneaut, Pennsylvania when a locomotive and freight cars plunged through a bridge that was under repair. The construction men were reportedly "crushed into shapeless masses".
- Temperatures across the Midwest and the Deep South went into triple digits in the United States even as the heat wave in the East abated. Columbia, Missouri, the location of the University of Missouri, was at 112°, St. Louis was at 104°, Cincinnati and Louisville at 103°, Wichita, Kansas at 102° and Kansas City and Little Rock, Arkansas were at 101°. Reportedly, grain crops in half of the counties of Kansas were ruined by the heat and drought.

== July 12, 1901 (Friday) ==
- The Acts Interpretation Act 1901 of Australia, referred to as "An Act for the Interpretation of Acts of Parliament and for Shortening their Language", took effect after receiving royal assent.
- Born: Benjamin Sonnenberg, Russian-born American press agent and public relations consultant, in Brest-Litovsk (now Belarus) (b. 1978)
- Died: Federico Errázuriz Echaurren, 51, President of Chile since 1896, died suddenly of a cerebral thrombosis while visiting Valparaíso. His Vice-President, Aníbal Zañartu, served as Acting President until the recently elected Germán Riesco could be inaugurated.

== July 13, 1901 (Saturday) ==
- Brazilian aviator Alberto Santos-Dumont became the first person to fly around the Eiffel Tower three times, one of the requirements of winning the prize of 100,000 French francs sponsored by wealthy oilman Henri Deutsch de la Meurthe, but missed— by nine minutes— the other condition that he complete a round trip between the Longchamp Racecourse and the Tower within less than half an hour. Dumont's maneuverable dirigible had departed the horse racing grounds at 6:41 in the morning and he had completed steering around the tower by 6:54, but encountered strong winds on his way back and arrived at 7:20. Santos-Dumont would win the Deutsch Prize (equivalent to about $20,000 in 1901 and more than half a million dollars in 2016) three months later, on October 19.
- Everyman, a revival of a late 15th-century English morality play, The Somonyng of Everyman, was staged for the first time in more than 300 years. William Poel and the Elizabethan Stage Society presented the updated version of the 1470 script of Petrus Dorlandus in a courtyard at London's Charterhouse Square, marking "the first production of a medieval play by a professional company". On the same playbill, the Society presented The Sacrifice of Isaac, "the first performance of a Chester mystery play since the 1570s."
- William McKinley became the first President of the United States to ride in an automobile. McKinley was spending the summer in his hometown of Canton, Ohio when a friend and Cleveland auto manufacturer, Zeb Davis, offered to drive the President around the town. "The President seemed to enjoy the straightaway part of the ride," a reporter would note, "but when the corners were turned short his backbone stiffened perceptibly, and it was noted that he took a firmer hold of the arms of the seat. It was the President's first experience in a horseless carriage on the public highway."
- Born:
  - Franz Anton Basch, Swiss-Hungarian Nazi "Racial Group Leader", in Zürich (d. 1946, executed)
  - Eliseo Vivas, Colombian-American philosopher, in Pamplona, Colombia (d. 1991)
  - Henry Billings, American mural artist and painter, in New York City (d. 1985)
  - Alfred Newman Gilbey, British Roman Catholic priest, in Harlow, England (d. 1998)
  - Julian Pemartín, Spanish animator, in Jerez de la Frontera, Spain (d. 1966)
- Died:
  - Peter Jackson, 40, black boxer from Saint Croix who reigned as the heavyweight champion of Australia from 1886 to 1888, and holder of the British Commonwealth title from 1890 to 1898, of tuberculosis (b. 1861)
  - Robert Carpenter, 70, English cricket batsman and umpire during the 19th century (b. 1830)

== July 14, 1901 (Sunday) ==
- On the 48th anniversary of the arrival of Commodore Matthew C. Perry and the crew of the USS Susquehanna at Japan's Edo Bay, a monument was dedicated by the Japanese at the city of Kurihama, where Perry first landed. The polished granite monolith was inscribed in letters of gold written by the recently resigned Prime Minister, the Marquis Itō Hirobumi, and was paid for by contributions from Japan's citizens, including the Emperor Meiji, who provided 1,000 yen toward the project. At the ceremony three U.S. Navy ships steamed into Edo Bay under the command of Commodore Frederick Rodgers, Perry's grandson, and joined a fleet of Japanese warships in firing a salute to the man who opened relations between the United States and Japan. The monument survived World War II and stands in Kurihama's Perry Park.
- Born: Gerald Finzi, British composer, in London (d. 1956)
- Died: Charles Nordhoff, 70, German-born American journalist (b. 1830)

== July 15, 1901 (Monday) ==
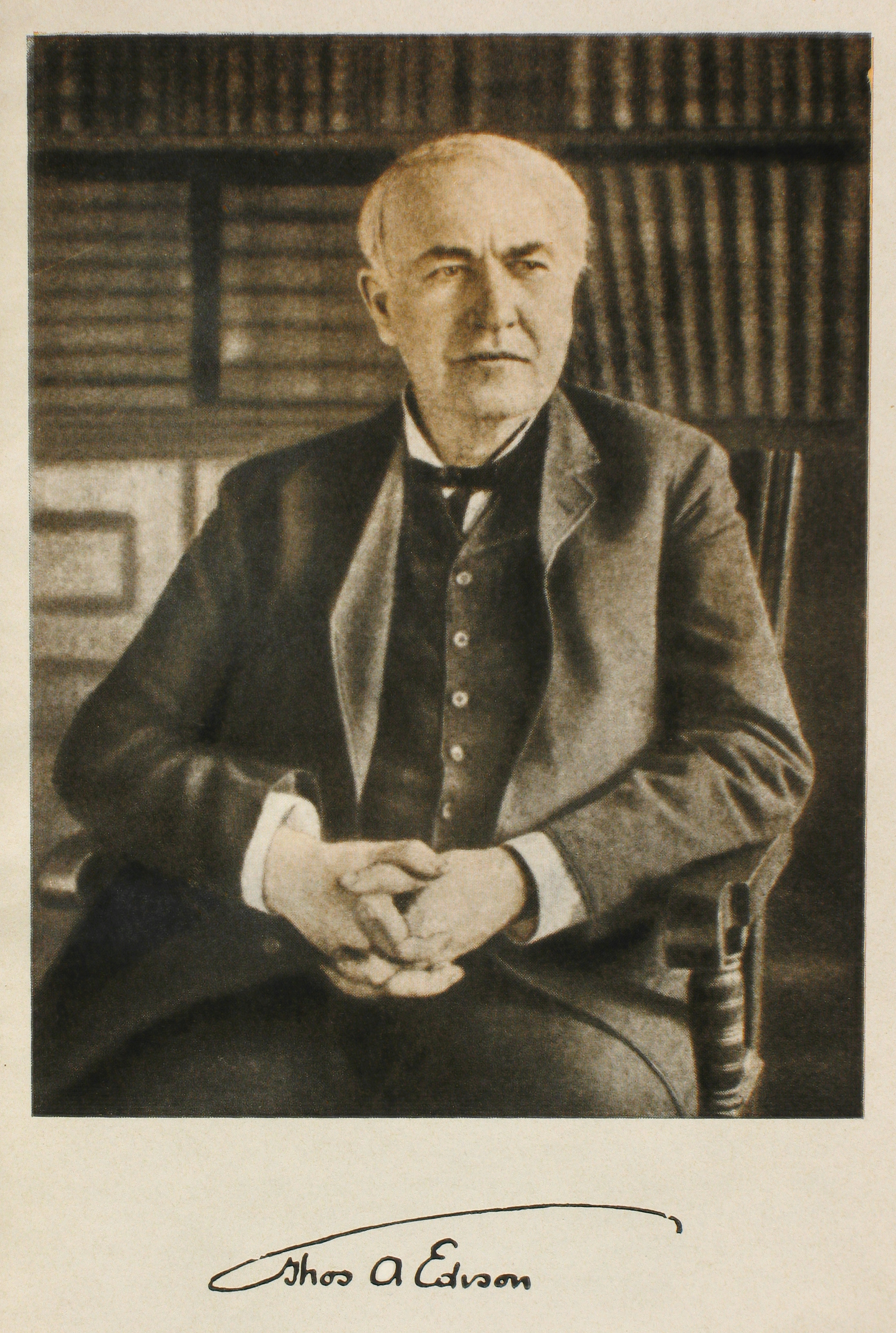
Thomas Edison

- The Edison Manufacturing Company, organized in 1900 by inventor Thomas Edison, attained a monopoly over the production of American motion pictures after a federal court in New York City ruled in its favor in a suit against the American Mutoscope & Biograph Company for patent infringement on Edison's kinetoscope. In advertisements after the decision, the Edison Company bragged "We have won." and noted that the decision "grants Mr. Edison the only right to manufacture motion picture machines and films." Until the decision's reversal on March 2, 1902, films could not be produced or exhibited without approval from Edison.
- The Amalgamated Association of Iron, Steel, and Tin Workers went on a nationwide strike.
- Albert Sears was arrested for murder after seven years posing as a Miss Annie Eberly and working as a schoolteacher in northwestern Arkansas.
- Born: Nicola Abbagnano, Italian philosopher (d. 1990)

== July 16, 1901 (Tuesday) ==
- French colonial official Louis-Guillaume Mouttet accepted the appointment to be the new Governor of Martinique, a decision that would ultimately cost him his life. As with nearly every other resident of Martinique's capital, Saint-Pierre, Martinique, Governor Mouttet would be killed in the eruption of Mount Pelée.
- Born: Albert Forster, Nazi German Governor of German-annexed Poland (Reichsgau Danzig-West Prussia) from 1939 to 1956, in Fürth, Germany (d. 1952, executed)

== July 17, 1901 (Wednesday) ==
- Hannibal Sehested, the Prime Minister of Denmark, resigned along with his entire cabinet.
- Japan relented on its June 24 request for an increase of the indemnity sought from China for damages from the Boxer Rebellion.
- The Baldwin-Ziegler expedition to the North Pole began, on the ships America and Belgica, with 42 men, captained by Evelyn Briggs Baldwin departing Norway from Tromsø, to set up stations in Franz Josef Land.
- Born:
  - Luigi Chinetti, Italian race car driver and three-time winner of 24 Hours of Le Mans, in Milan (d. 1994)
  - G. P. Wells, British zoologist, author and son of H. G. Wells (d. 1985)
  - Bruno Jasieński, Polish poet, as Wiktor Zysman in Klimontów, Poland (d. 1938, executed)
- Died:
  - Major General Daniel Butterfield, 69, American Civil War hero, Medal of Honor winner, and composer of the bugle call "Taps" (b. 1831)
  - John Farmer, 65, British composer (b. 1835)

== July 18, 1901 (Thursday) ==
- The Philippine Constabulary, a paramilitary law enforcement unit with American officers and Filipino troops, was established as the "Insular Constabulary" by the Philippine Commission's Act Number 175, for the purpose of having local soldiers take over from the U.S. Army in fighting the remaining insurgents. Most of the Constabulary's members would be recruited from young men who were members of rural peasant tribes The 70 American officers picked for the job began recruiting members of the force (including Filipinos who were commissioned as lieutenants) on August 8, under the overall command of Brigadier General Henry T. Allen. The force would eventually consist of 6,000 native troops, who would often employ brutal tactics under the direction of the Americans.
- Earl Russell, a member of the House of Lords, was arraigned before his fellow members and pleaded guilty to charges of bigamy. Though not removed from the Lords, he was sentenced to three months imprisonment at the Hollowell jail. "During his imprisonment," the New-York Tribune noted, "Lord Russell will be allowed his own servants, cook, and other comforts not ordinarily accorded prisoners," though smoking a cigar was not one of the privileges. He would serve his sentence and be released in October.
- Tom Horn murdered Willie Nickell, the 14-year-old son of sheep ranchers Kels and Mary Nickell.
- Born: Celesta Geyer, American circus performer billed as the 555-pound (252 kg) "Dolly Dimples, the World's Most Beautiful Fat Lady", at the Ringling Brothers circus in the 1930s; as Celesta Hermann in Cincinnati. In the early 1950s, Geyer would go on an extreme diet for 14 months after suffering a near-fatal heart attack, and drop to a weight of 112 pounds (51 kg), recognized by the Guinness Book of World Records as the greatest weight loss. She would operate an art gallery until her death in 1982.
- Died: Jan ten Brink, Dutch writer (b. 1834)

== July 19, 1901 (Friday) ==
- The Government of Newfoundland took control of all railroad tracks (including bridges), lands and telegraph lines owned privately by railway contractor Sir Robert Gillespie Reid In return for $850,000 Reid sold 3,135,000 acres of land.
- Died: Eleanor Anne Ormerod, 73, English entomologist (b. 1828)

== July 20, 1901 (Saturday) ==
- Representatives of Sultan Abdelaziz of Morocco and France's Governor-General of Algeria, Paul Révoil, signed the Protocol of Paris, agreeing upon a border between Algeria and Morocco.
- Charles Dow, publisher of The Wall Street Journal, wrote an editorial in the Journal titled "Methods of Reading the Market" and proposed what would become known as the "theory of double tops", observing that "Records of trading show that in many cases when a stock reaches top it will have a moderate decline and then go back again to the near highest figures."
- Born: Heinie Manush, American baseball outfielder and member of the Baseball Hall of Fame, in Tuscumbia, Alabama (d. 1971)

== July 21, 1901 (Sunday) ==
- American astronomer Edward Charles Pickering photographed the spectrum of a streak of lightning and announced a discovery that proved to be an incorrect conclusion. Pickering, who made many valuable contributions to the field, concluded "that not only are the chemical elements so-called compounds, but that hydrogen itself, instead of being a single element, seemed to be a composite."
- The New York Times published a front-page story, "Mosquitoes as Firebugs", that warned that attempts to eradicate the mosquito population in South Orange, New Jersey, had resulted in new dangers. Starting in 1892, Leland Howard of the United States Department of Agriculture had launched a campaign to kill mosquito larvae by putting crude oil on bodies of water. In addition to polluting the water, killing fish and injuring domestic and wild animals, the oil stopped larvae, but caused some of the existing mosquitoes to thrive, and some of the "Jersey Skeeters" that had built a resistance had enough oil on and in their bodies to become flammable. The Times reported that "blazing mosquitoes" that had somehow continued to fly after encountering an ignition source "have set fire to curtains and draperies before the insects were consumed."
- Born: Albert H. Gordon, American businessman and philanthropist who lived to the age of 107, in North Scituate, Massachusetts (d. 2009)

== July 22, 1901 (Monday) ==
- China and the Eight-Nation Alliance formally agreed on an indemnity plan for China to pay 450,000,000 taels ($332,000,000), along with four percent annual interest, to the nations over the course of the next 40 years for reparations arising from the Boxer Rebellion. The payment was arranged through a bond issue with China paying 23 million taels ($17,000,000) each year toward the interest and the liquidation of the principal.
- The first section of the Addis Ababa-Djibouti railroad opened with the first train service in French Somalia, on a 67-mile (108 km) section from the Port of Djibouti to Douanlé, located on the border with Ethiopia. The line would not reach Addis Ababa until 1917.
- New York City's 50,000 tailors went on strike.
- Born: Charles Weidman, American choreographer and pioneer of modern dance, in Lincoln, Nebraska (d. 1975)
- Died:
  - Albert Jenks, 75, American portrait painter (b. 1869)
  - Henri de Lacaze-Duthiers, 80, German zoologist (b. 1821)

== July 23, 1901 (Tuesday) ==
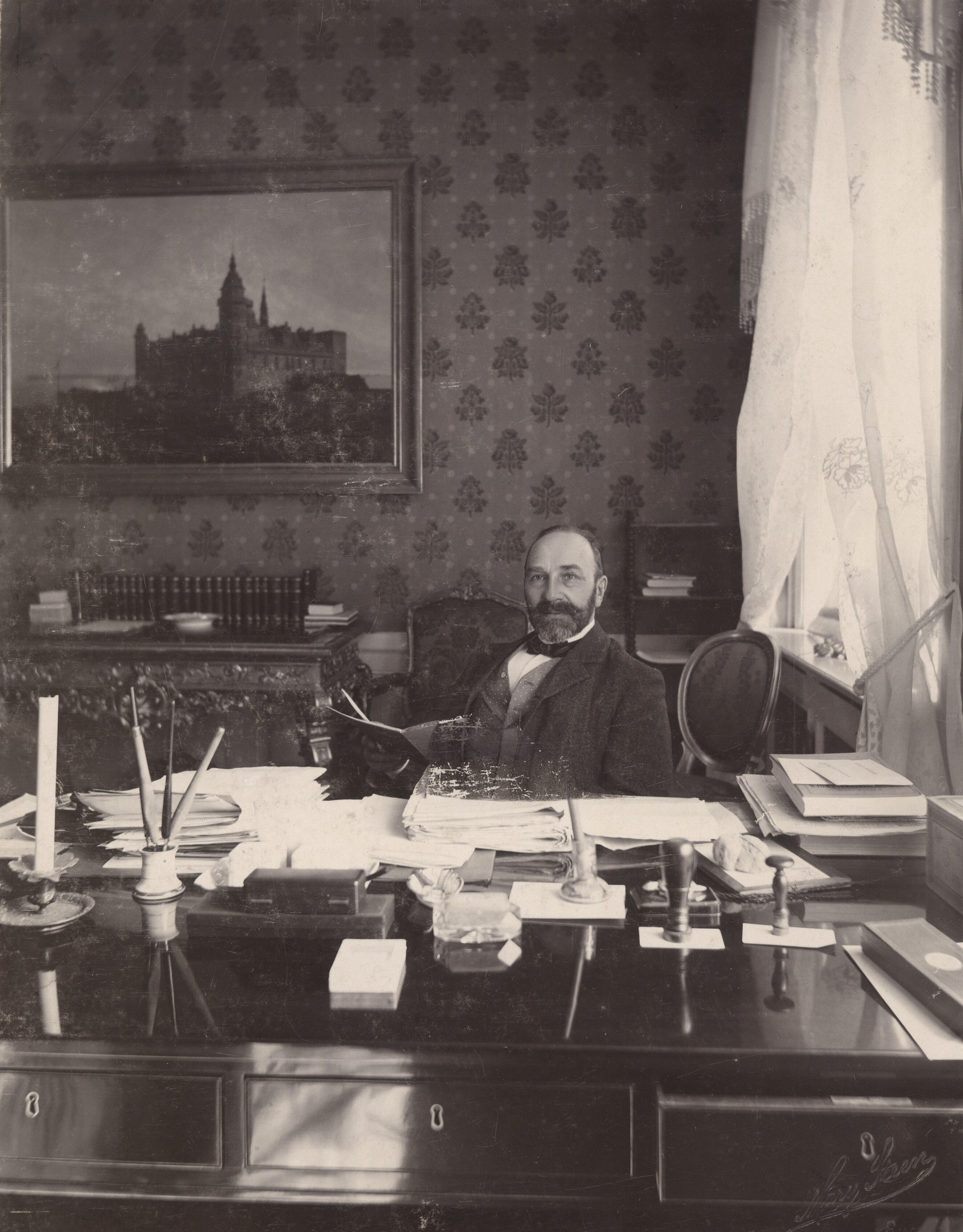
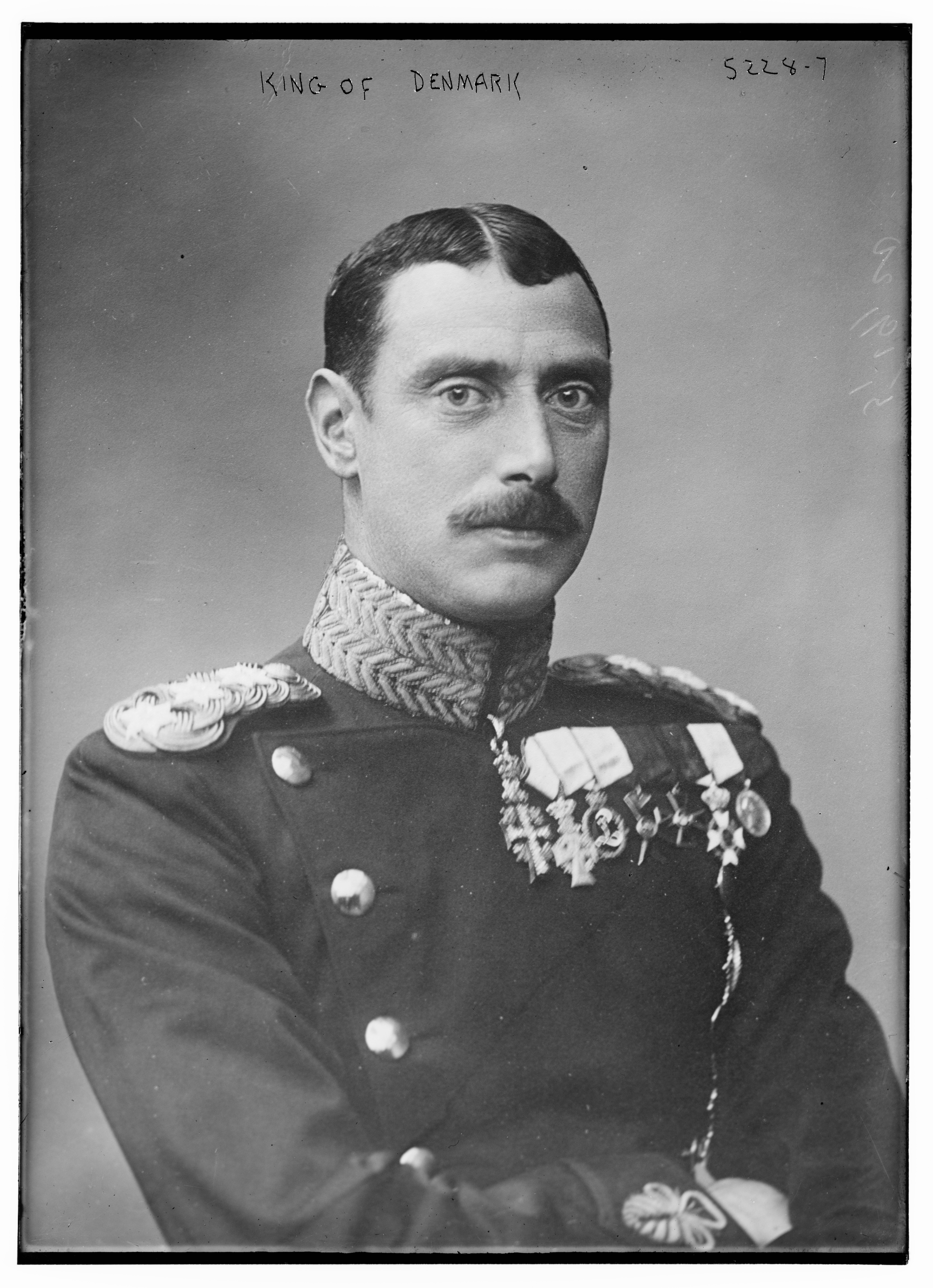
Premier Deuntzer and King Christian X
- Johan Henrik Deuntzer was appointed by King Christian as the new Prime Minister of Denmark, as the King "finally consented to follow normal parliamentary rule by calling on the majority of the Lower Chamber to form the government"
- Prolific American inventor John J. Montgomery was awarded U.S. Patent Number 679,155 for his invention, the "gold concentrator", that used a combination of strong magnets and mechanical separating devices to isolate gold from deposits of magnetite. The device would be successfully tested at Manresa Beach in Santa Cruz County, California and allow a ranching family to obtain sufficient gold to construct some commercial buildings in the town of Aptos.
- President William McKinley proclaimed the organization of a new civil government in Puerto Rico, with William H. Hunt as the new Governor, succeeding Charles Herbert Allen.

== July 24, 1901 (Wednesday) ==
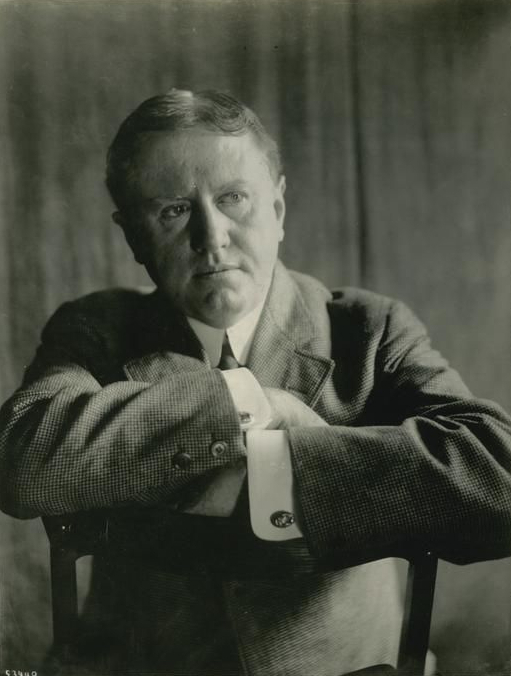
"O. Henry"

- American author William Sidney Porter, who would write under the pen name of O. Henry was released from the Ohio Penitentiary in Columbus, Ohio after serving three years of a five-year sentence for embezzlement from the First National Bank in Austin, Texas. In 1902, he would move to New York City and begin the most prolific phase of his writing career, including a new short story every week for the New York World Sunday Magazine supplement. Literary critic Guy Davenport offers the theory of Porter that "The pseudonym that he began to write under in prison is constructed from the Oh of Ohio and the en and ry in penitentiary (he gives the code for this in the story "The Man Higher Up," in which a con man named Alfred E. Ricks is caught but returns to the game as A. L. Fredericks)."
- The American battleship USS Kearsarge inadvertently fired an armed shell at the city of Newport, Rhode Island and struck the Newport City Hall. The ship had been performing a routine gunnery drill and was firing toward the shore, when the officers realized that a live shell had been inadvertently loaded in with the dummy ammunition used for such tests. "The shell hit one of the great, granite blocks of the second story" of the Hall, a report noted the next day, "within fifteen inches of an open window where people were standing, making a hole an inch deep, glanced against the stone balcony, then took another direction, passing up Bull Street until it struck a tree, where it tore off a branch several inches in diameter and burst into fragments." Half an hour after the shot was fired, two officers arrived and determined that the fragments were those of a one-pound shell. Remarkably, nobody was injured even though the streets had been filled with people when the shot hit shortly after 5:00 in the afternoon.
- General Zurbano, a holdout in the Philippine resistance to American rule, surrendered to the United States Army in Tayabas Province on Luzon, along with 518 troops and 29 of his officers.
- Born: Mabel Albertson, American actress (d. 1982)

== July 25, 1901 (Thursday) ==
- Thirty Russian soldiers were killed and 60 injured in an explosion of artillery in the city of Batum, now part of the Republic of Georgia.
- Germán Riesco was selected as the new President of Chile.
- South Carolina's Democratic Party committee voted to revoke the membership of U.S. Senator John L. McLaurin, based on his attempted resignation the previous month.
- The Russian Empire banished American explorer and journalist George Kennan, after the Minister of the Interior concluded that he was "politically untrustworthy". Kennan had attained worldwide fame in 1883 after reporting about his experiences in Siberia, and was in his hotel room in Saint Petersburg when a police officer placed him under house arrest and informed him that he had 24 hours to leave the country.

== July 26, 1901 (Friday) ==
- Former Senator Carlos Rangel Garbiras led an invasion from Colombia into Venezuela with 4,000 fellow Venezuelan exiles supplemented by Colombian troops, in an attempt to overthrow the government of Venezuelan President Cipriano Castro. Diplomatic relations between Colombia and Venezuela would be severed on December 16.
- The Duke of York, who was nine years away from becoming King George V of the United Kingdom, finished his tour of the newly independent nation of Australia, departing from Fremantle with the Duchess of York and the royal entourage to return to Britain. "It was a spectacular visit," an author would note later, "setting the seal of royal approval on the fledgling nation. It also gave Australians, on the other side of the world from mother England, powerful assurance of their valued place in the Empire."
- RMS Celtic, the largest ship in the world, departed Liverpool on its maiden voyage. The first of a new generation of ocean liners operated by the White Star Line, the Celtic was the first ship that could carry a tonnage of more than 20,000 tons, and was the first ship to exceed 700 feet (210 m) in length.
- At 6:00 p.m., registration closed for the drawing for lots in Oklahoma Territory. At El Reno, 3,850 appeared on the final day, and the final total of registrants ended at 136,315. At Lawton, the total number was 30,691 as 532 people showed up. Drawing would begin on July 29.
- The town of Simpsonville, South Carolina, which had had a population of 195 people in the 1900 U.S. Census, was incorporated. Within 100 years, it would have more than 14,000 residents and by 2016, its population would be 100 times larger than what it had been at the time of its founding.
- United States Secretary of the Navy John Davis Long ordered a court of inquiry to examine the conduct of Rear Admiral Winfield Scott Schley during the Spanish–American War, after Schley had requested the investigation in order to be cleared of rumors of wrongdoing.

== July 27, 1901 (Saturday) ==
- Abraham Kuyper took office as the new Prime Minister of the Netherlands.
- A new USS Maine battleship was launched from Philadelphia, three years after the explosion of the previous USS Maine in Havana Harbor.
- The borough of Bridgeville, Pennsylvania was incorporated as its own self-governing municipality.
- At Kill Devil Hills, four miles south of Kitty Hawk, North Carolina, Wilbur and Orville Wright completed construction of the improved version of the wing design of their planned flying machine. On that day, Wilbur made seventeen glides into headwinds of 13 miles per hour (21 km/h), and on one of the last attempts of the day, covered a distance of 300 feet (91 m) in 19 seconds aloft.
- Died: Brooke Foss Westcott, 76, British Anglican bishop and Biblical translator (b. 1825)

== July 28, 1901 (Sunday) ==
- The Port of San Francisco was shut down as the 13,000 waterfront workers in the City Front Federation walked out on strike after midnight. For three months, passage into and out of the harbor was halted, and 300 assaults (five of them fatal) were reported during the violence between labor and management.
- Born:
  - Rudy Vallée, American bandleader and popular singer, as Hubert Prior Vallée, in Island Pond, Vermont (d. 1986)
  - Harry Bridges, Australian-American union leader, who co-founded the International Longshore and Warehouse Union (ILWU) and one-time member of the Communist Party USA (d. 1990)
  - Freddie Fitzsimmons, American baseball player and manager, in Mishawaka, Indiana (d. 1979)

== July 29, 1901 (Monday) ==
- The Socialist Party of America was created by the merger of the Social Democratic Party and members of the Socialist Labor Party.
- The United States Department of the Interior began the process of drawing for allotment of land applications in the former Kiowa and Comanche Indian nations in Oklahoma. At 9:30 in the morning, 30,000 people gathered at El Reno and in Lawton to be witnesses. The first name drawn in El Reno was Stephen A. Holcomb of Pauls Valley, who won the right to pick a tract before anyone else, while James R. Wood of Weatherford was the first in Lawton, where the most valuable of the lands were located. The saddest story was that of Minerva McClintock, who had gotten married the day before; after her name was drawn ninth in Lawton, she learned that she had forfeited her right because the drawing was limited to unmarried people.
- Died: Paul Alexis, 54, French novelist, at Aix-en-Provence, France (b. 1847)

== July 30, 1901 (Tuesday) ==
- The last German troops were withdrawn from China, with the exception of 25 people assigned to govern the German Embassy in Beijing.
- By a vote of 109 to 23, the Alabama constitutional convention began the first of its measures to disenfranchise African Americans from voting. The "grandfather clause" limited the right to register to vote to those persons whose ancestors were war veterans.

== July 31, 1901 (Wednesday) ==
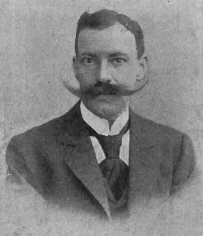
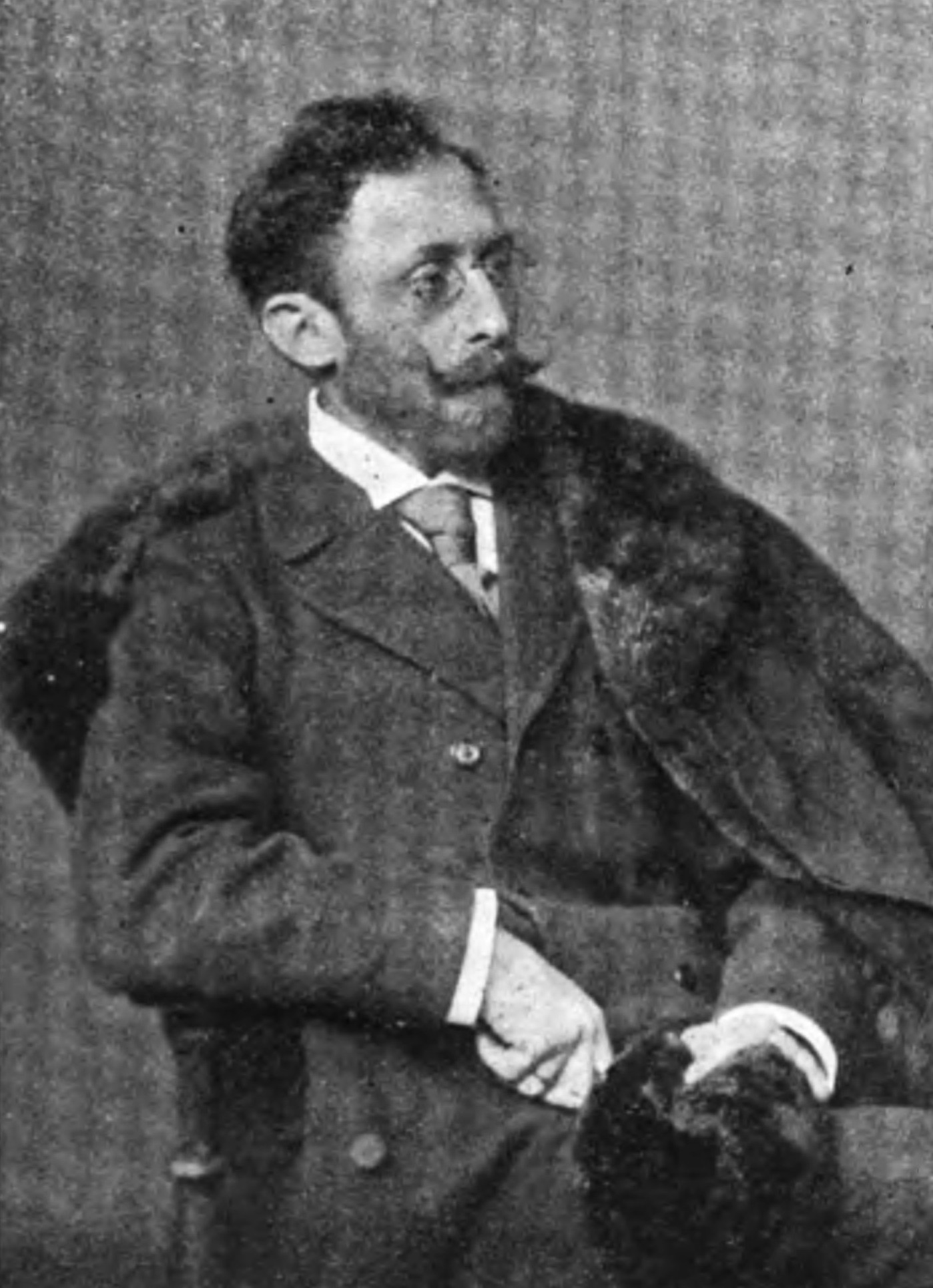
Aeronauts Süring and Berson
- Reinhard Süring and Arthur Berson of Germany ascended in a hot air balloon to a height of 10,820 metres (35,500 ft), breaking the official record for the highest distance away from the Earth. Departing from Tempelhof on the Preussen, they conducted meteorological observations and landed at Cottbus. Unofficially, Britons Henry Tracey Coxwell and James Glaisher were claimed to have reached as high as 11,300 metres (37,100 ft) on September 5, 1862, after losing consciousness after recording a barometer reading at 8,800 metres (28,900 ft).
- RRS Discovery, commanded by Robert Falcon Scott, departed London from the East India Docks at noon to the port of Cowes on the Isle of Wight to take on supplies and to await the visit of King Edward and Queen Alexandra before its departure on the British National Antarctic Expedition.
- The British House of Commons voted a grant of 100,000 pounds to Lord Roberts in appreciation of his service in the Second Boer War.
- Born:
  - Rudolf Slánský, General Secretary of the Communist Party of Czechoslovakia and de facto leader of Czechoslovakia from 1946 until his arrest and trial in 1952, in Nezvěstice, Austria-Hungary (d. 1952, executed)
  - Jean Dubuffet, French painter, in Le Havre (d. 1985)
  - Alexander Schreiner, German-American organist for the Salt Lake Tabernacle organ, in Nuremberg (d. 1987)
