= Aliotta =

Aliotta is a surname. Notable people with the surname include:

- Antonio Aliotta (1881–1964), Italian philosopher
- Marialuisa Aliotta, Italian astrophysicist
- Mitch Aliotta (1944–2015), American vocalist and bassist

== See also ==
- Aliotti
