= Alioto =

Alioto is a surname. Notable people with the surname include:

- Angela Alioto (born 1949), American politician
- Dario Alioto (born 1984), American poker player
- Joseph Alioto (1916–1998), American politician
- Kathleen Sullivan Alioto (born 1944), American editor and politician
- Massimo Alioto, American engineer
- Michela Alioto-Pier (born 1968), American politician
- Tim Alioto (born 1958), American soccer player
- Tom Alioto (born 1958), American soccer player

== See also ==
- Alioto's
