= June 1901 =

Month in 1901

<<	June 1901					>>
Su	Mo	Tu	We	Th	Fr	Sa
						1
2	3	4	5	6	7	8
9	10	11	12	13	14	15
16	17	18	19	20	21	22
23	24	25	26	27	28	29
30

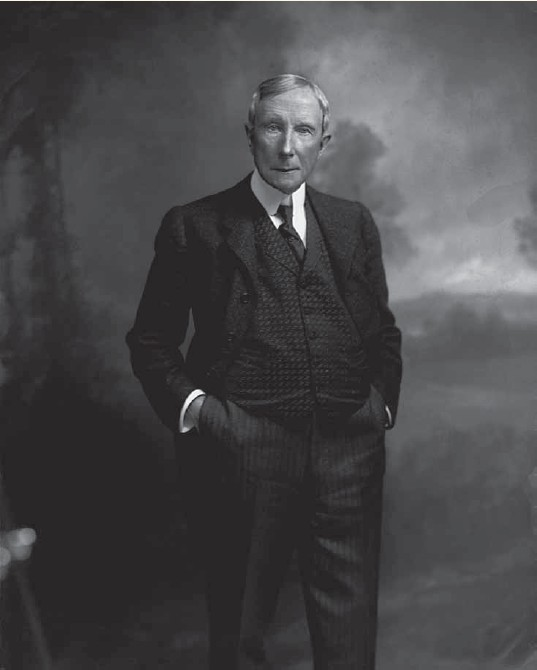
June 1, 1901: Rockefeller establishes research institute

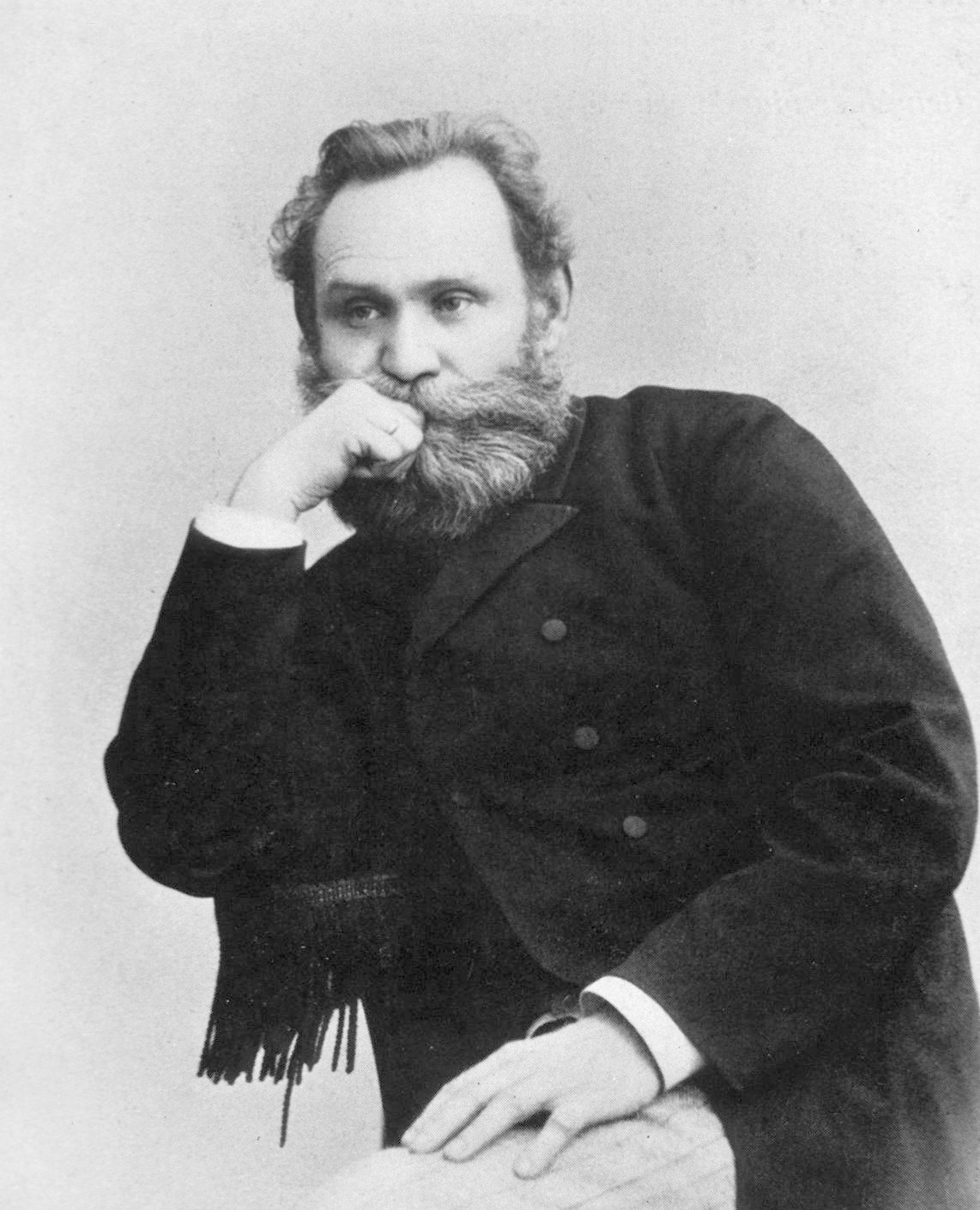
June 8, 1901: Ivan Pavlov demonstrates conditioning experiments

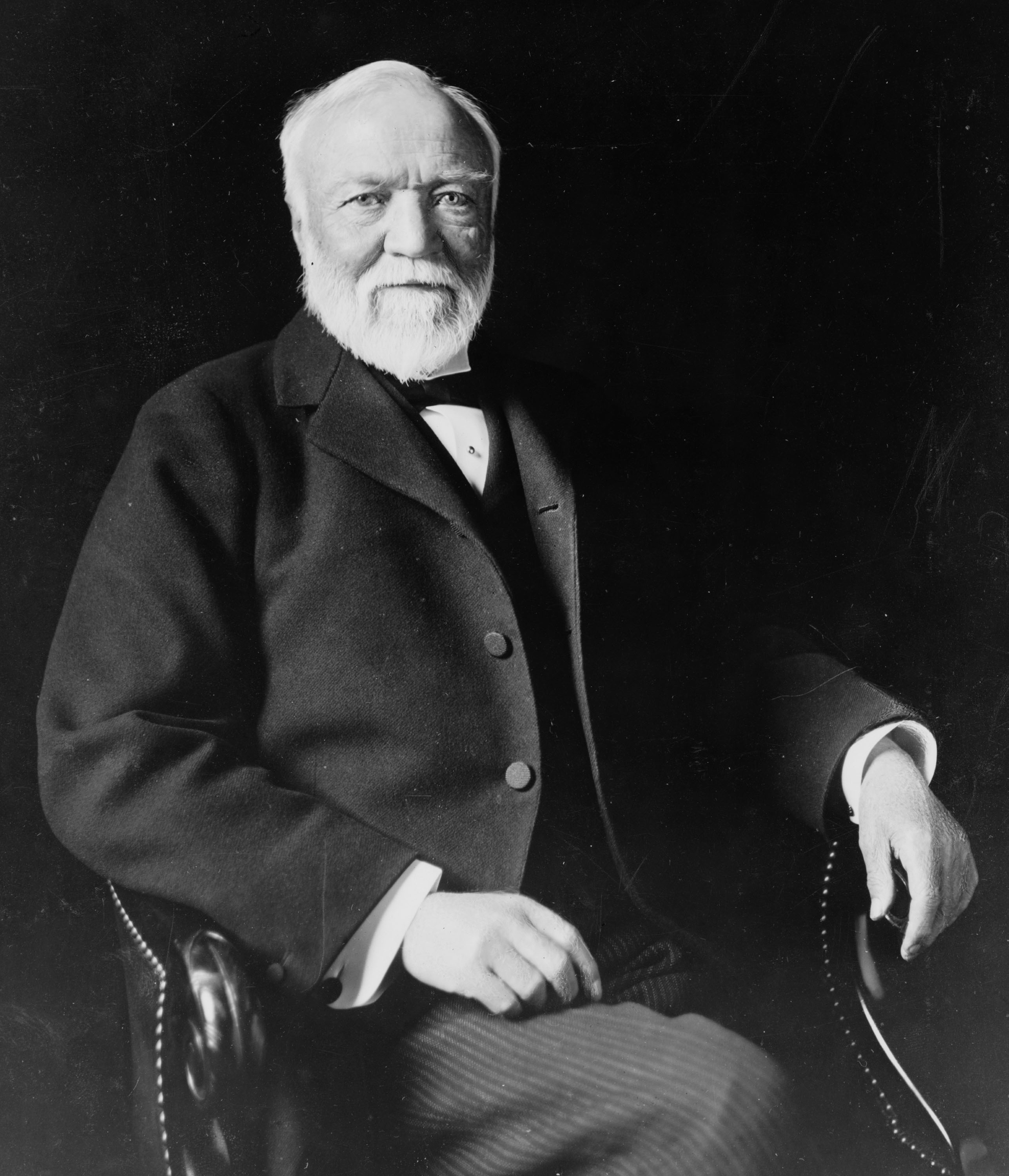
June 7, 1901: Carnegie donates millions to universities

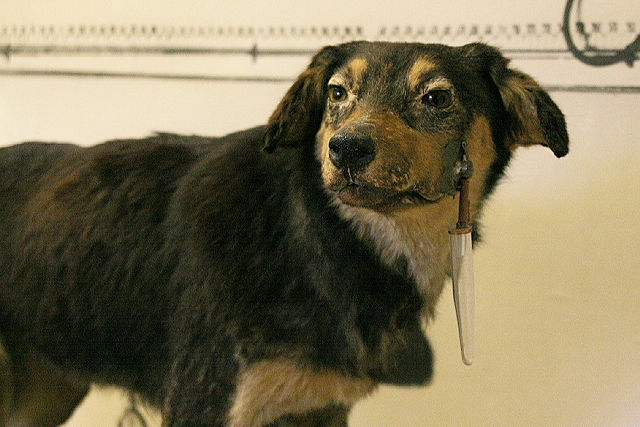
Baikal, a Pavlov dog

The following events occurred in June 1901:

== June 1, 1901 (Saturday) ==
- Oil multimillionaire John D. Rockefeller announced the establishment of the Rockefeller Institute for Medical Research.
- The first Indian Motorcycle prototype was demonstrated in Springfield, Massachusetts at 12:00 noon.
- Born: John Van Druten, English playwright; in London (d. 1957)

== June 2, 1901 (Sunday) ==
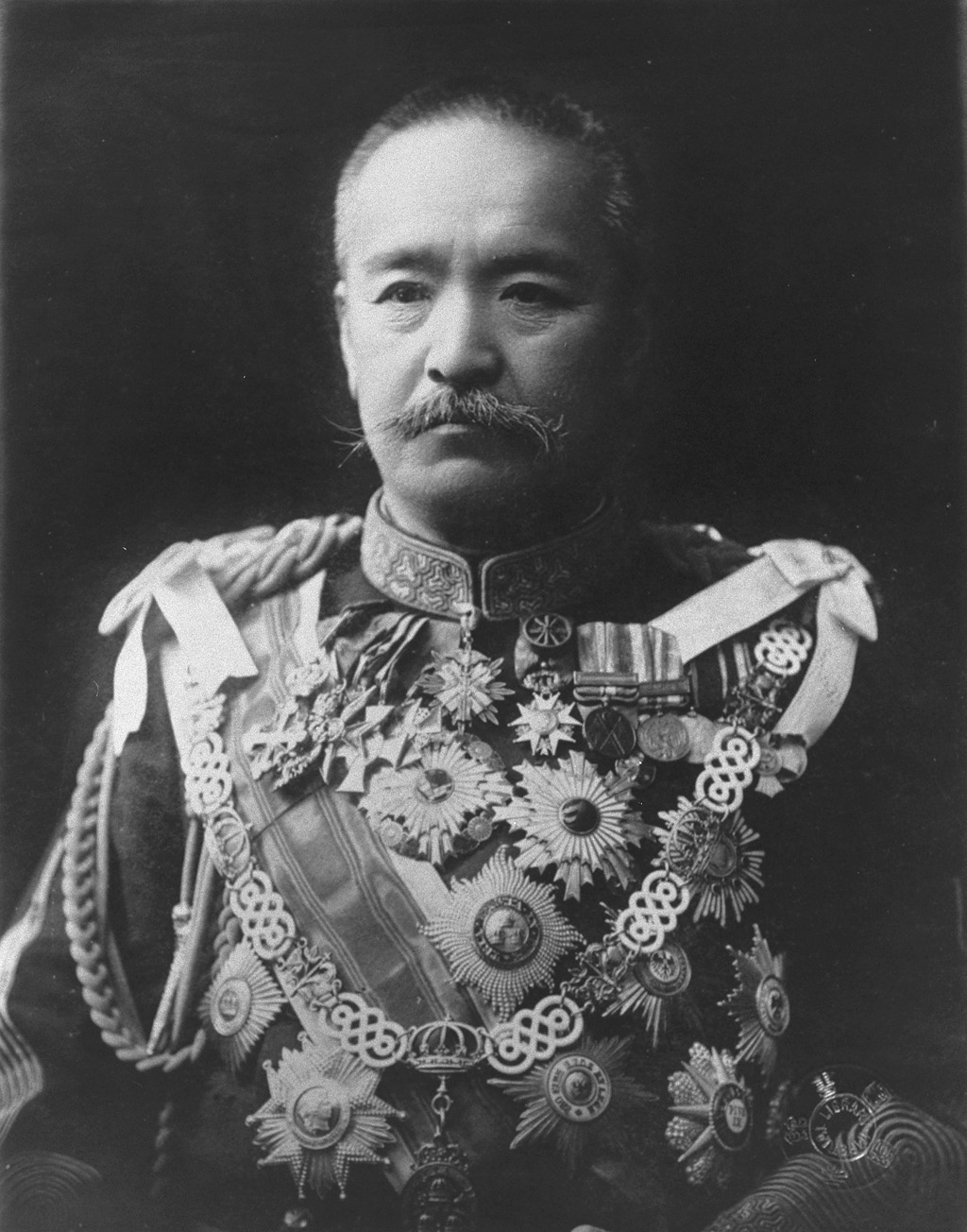
Katsura

- General Katsura Tarō became the new Prime Minister of Japan, succeeding Itō Hirobumi. The protege and former Minister of the Army during the administration of Premier for Yamagata Aritomo had been selected after Ito and his cabinet had resigned.

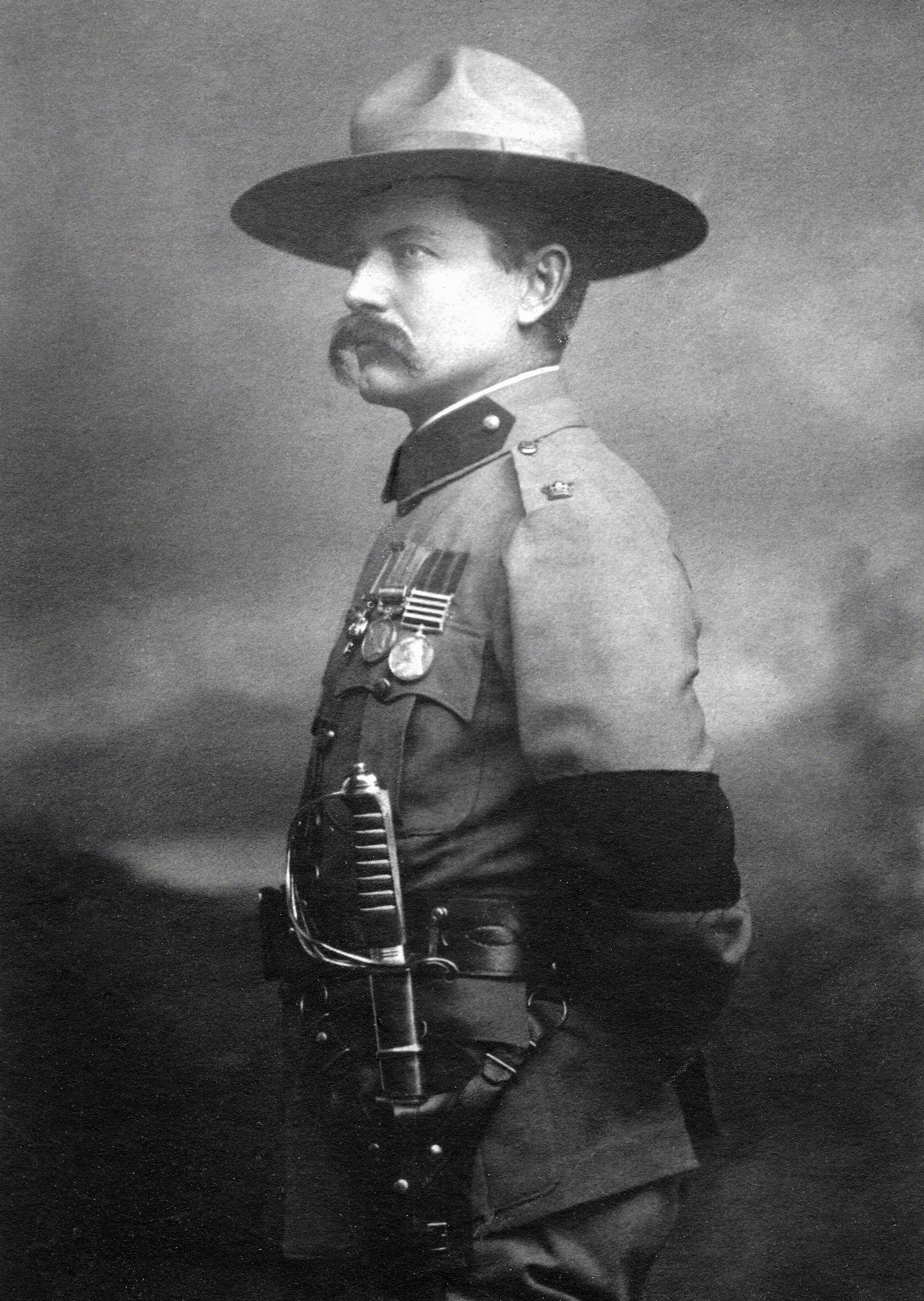
Burnham

- Captain Frederick Russell Burnham, an American soldier of fortune who had joined the Second Boer War to fight with the British Army, found himself surrounded by enemy soldiers while attempting to dynamite the Boer railroad line connecting Pretoria to Delagoa Bay, fled on horseback, and was presumed dead after his horse was hit by a bullet and fell on top of him. The next day, "when he came to, both his friends and foes had departed", but Burnham returned to the tracks and set off the dynamite charges to destroy the tracks, then took refuge in an empty kraal for another two days. When he heard the sound of distant gunfire, he managed to locate a patrol of men under Major-General John Baillie Dickson's brigade, and survived. For his heroism, Burnham would be awarded the Distinguished Service Order.
- Boer General P. H. Kritzinger captured the small city of Jamestown in Britain's Cape Colony. Pete Bester, a deserter from the British Army who had gone over to fight with the Boers, rode in to town and looted shops, the local hotel, and the city armory, then kept supplies from being delivered to the area for four months. Bester would eventually be captured and executed by the British for treason on November 24.
- Following up on the May 19 elections for the lower house of the Cortes, voters in Spain cast their votes for half of the seats in the Senate, with the Liberal Party winning 117 seats, the Conservatives 56, and the other 24 members being drawn from other parties.
- One of the first arrests in America for driving a car too fast was made on 35th Street in Chicago. A lawyer for American Steel and Wire was charged with driving 20 miles per hour (32 km/h) in an 8-mile-per-hour (13 km/h) zone. After initially being fined ten dollars, Grant protested that he would appeal, and the fine was increased to forty dollars.
- Born:
  - Bert Andrews, American Pulitzer Prize-winning investigative reporter; in Colorado Springs, Colorado (d. 1953)
- Died:
  - James A. Herne, 60, American actor and playwright (b. 1839)
  - George Leslie Mackay, 56, Canadian Presbyterian missionary to Taiwan who established a clinic, a hospital and numerous schools (b. 1844)

== June 3, 1901 (Monday) ==
- Nine companies of the 9th U.S. Infantry Regiment arrived in Manila after being withdrawn from China. General Chaffee arrived in Manila two days later.
- Count Alfred von Waldersee, the commanding general of Germany's occupation troops in China, departed Beijing in an elaborate ceremony.
- The British Cape Colony was invaded by 700 Boer troops under the command of Commandant Scheeper, in attack on Willowmore. British forces drove the Boers away after a nine-hour battle.
- Born:
  - Marshal Zhang Xueliang, Chinese military leader, kept under house arrest from 1937 to 1990; in Tai'an, Liaoning (d. 2001)
  - Verner W. Clapp, South African-American librarian and writer; in Johannesburg (d. 1972)
  - José Lins do Rego, Brazilian novelist; in Pilar, Paraíba (d. 1957)
- Died: Joseph H. Jordan, 59, former slave who founded the first African-American Universalist Church

== June 4, 1901 (Tuesday) ==
- The United States Department of the Treasury issued an order prohibiting the entry of any immigrants who were afflicted with pulmonary tuberculosis, with directions to turn them back at Ellis Island.
- Russia's State Council approved a proposal by Interior Minister Dmitry Sipyagin to ease censorship restrictions on periodicals. Although a newspaper or magazine could be shut down if it got three warnings, a first warning would expire if a second did not follow within a year; and two warnings in a year meant probation for a two-year period, after which the record would be clear. "No longer would the threat of preliminary censorship ... hover indefinitely over a twice-warned periodical," an author would later note.
- Eight iron miners were killed in an explosion at the Chapin mine at Iron Mountain, Michigan.
- Died: Georg Vierling, 81, German composer (b. 1820)

== June 5, 1901 (Wednesday) ==
- The Epsom Derby, England's premier horse racing event, was won by Volodyovski, an American-trained horse leased by William Collins Whitney.
- A bolt of lightning struck the local schoolhouse in Littleton, Iowa, reportedly "injuring all of the school children, many of them seriously".
- Born:
  - Carl Joachim Friedrich, German-American political scientist; in Leipzig (d. 1984)
  - B. R. Lakin, American Baptist preacher and evangelist, and mentor of Jerry Falwell; in Wayne County, West Virginia (d. 1984)
- Died: Dagny Juel, 33, Norwegian writer, shot in the back of the head by an admirer, Wladyslaw Emeryk, in a murder-suicide (b. 1867)

== June 6, 1901 (Thursday) ==
- Despite being outnumbered, 240 British troops under the command of Colonel Wilson surprised and routed a 400-man force led by General Beyer, in a battle 34 miles (55 km) west of Warm Baths, South Africa. The British casualties were limited to three deaths and 15 wounded. On the same day, Britain's General Elliot fought with the Boer forces of General Christiaan de Wet at Reitz, with high casualties on both sides.
- During a hunting trip in what would later become Coconino National Forest to collect specimens for the Smithsonian Institution, John McCarty, Commissioner of the Arizona Game and Fish Department, was killed when a shotgun shell accidentally exploded in the barrel, fatally wounding him in the face. McCarty's body would not be located until August 19.
- Born: Sukarno, Indonesian state leader, first President of Indonesia; in Surabaya, Dutch East Indies (d. 1970)
- Died: Dr. Thomas Bond, 59, British surgeon, pioneer in offender profiling during the investigation of the Jack the Ripper murders; suicide by jumping (b. 1841)

== June 7, 1901 (Friday) ==
- Philanthropist and multimillionaire Andrew Carnegie transferred $10,000,000 worth of his bonds from U.S. Steel to improve universities in his native Scotland, with half of the money going to a scholarship fund.
- The British Governor of the Gambia, Sir George Denton, signed a lease with King Musa Molloh of Fuladu, whose territory lay in both British Gambia and French Senegal. In return for £500 per year, Musa Molloh agreed to a British protectorate.
- Pennsylvania Governor William A. Stone signed a new law paving the way for a rapid transit system.
- Born: Joseph Wenger, American naval officer and cryptanalyst; in Patterson, Louisiana (d. 1970)

== June 8, 1901 (Saturday) ==
- Russian physiologist Ivan Pavlov began demonstrating his experiments in classical conditioning to two physiologists sent by the Nobel Committee, Professor J.E. Johansson of Sweden's Karolinska Institute, and Johansson's assistant, fellow physiology professor Robert Tigerstedt. Over the next ten days, Dr. Pavlov showed the two men his results in using a buzzer (rather than a bell) to trigger a salivation response with dogs. The two Swedish delegates were favorably impressed, and Pavlov would become the first Russian to win the Nobel Prize, being awarded the Nobel Prize in Physiology or Medicine in 1904.
- Lorenzo Snow, the President of the Church of Jesus Christ of Latter-day Saints, directed a second drive to send missionaries to Mexico, appointing Ammon M. Tenney for that purpose.

== June 9, 1901 (Sunday) ==
- Charles de Foucauld, who would be declared a martyr of the Roman Catholic Church after his assassination in 1916, was ordained as a priest at the age of 43, and set about to become the first priest to serve the Sahara. He would write later, "In Morocco, as big as France, with 10,000,000 inhabitants, not a single priest in the interior; in the Sahara, seven or eight times as big as France, and much more inhabited than was thought earlier, a mere dozen missionaries. No people seemed to be more abandoned than these."
- The New York Giants baseball team set a modern-day record of 31 hits and 25 runs in a nine-inning game against the Cincinnati Reds. A crowd of 17,000 fans came to the game in Cincinnati's League Park, which only had seating for 3,000 people. As a result, "the overflow crowd ringed the outfield and crowded close behind the infield". The final score would have been New York 25, Cincinnati 13, in front of a crowd of 17,000, but umpire Bob Emslie finally declared the game a 9–0 forfeit because so many of the baseballs were lost in the crowd, leading to a record for the number of automatic doubles in a game (14 for both teams), something that would normally "occur only once in 700,000 non-extra-inning games". The Giants' record of 31 hits remains a record in nine-inning game, and would be tied on August 29, 1992, by the Milwaukee Brewers in a 22–2 win over the Toronto Blue Jays. On July 10, 1932, the Cleveland Indians would get 32 hits in 18 innings, in an 18–17 loss to the Philadelphia Athletics. The event proved to be the final game for Cincinnati pitcher Amos Rusie, who would later be inducted into the Baseball Hall of Fame.
- Born: Marion Gering, Russian-born American film director, producer and actor; in Rostov-on-Don, Russian Empire (d. 1977)
- Died:
  - Walter Besant, 63, English novelist (b. 1836)
  - Adolf Bötticher, 58, German art historian (b. 1842)
  - Edward Moran, 72, English painter (b. 1829)

== June 10, 1901 (Monday) ==
- Sixteen men were killed in an explosion of the Pittsburgh Coal Company coal mine at Port Royal, Pennsylvania. The dead included an assistant mine superintendent identified as a second cousin of President William McKinley, and a mine superintendent. A party of safety inspectors entered the mine the next morning and was injured in a second explosion.
- Despite the surrender of most of the Filipino insurgents, American occupation troops were attacked on the island of Luzon, near Lipa. Three officers were killed.
- Born: Frederick Loewe, German-born American composer who collaborated with lyricist Alan Jay Lerner in writing numerous musicals, including My Fair Lady and Camelot; in Berlin (d. 1988)
- Died:
  - Robert Williams Buchanan, 60, English poet, critic and novelist. (b. 1841) A biographer would write later that "Although his literary and dramatic profits were substantial, Buchanan, who was generous in his gifts to less successful writers, was always improvident, and he lost late in life all his fortune in disastrous speculation. In 1900 he was made bankrupt. An attack of paralysis disabled him late in that year, and he died in poverty at Streatham ..."
  - Robert Loyd-Lindsay, 69, British general, philanthropist, and one of the wealthiest landowners within the United Kingdom (b. 1832)

== June 11, 1901 (Tuesday) ==
- The Cook Islands were formally annexed to New Zealand, following a petition signed by the ariki (the chiefs of the Māori people) on Rarotonga and the other inhabited islands. Lieutenant Colonel Walter Gudgeon would become the first resident commissioner of the Islands, which ranged from Penrhyn in the north to Mangaia, 890 miles to the south.
- The Supreme Court of the Philippines was officially established by the passage of Act 136 of the Philippine Commission administered by the United States, creating the organizational structure that exists there today. Governor William Howard Taft administered the oath of office to Chief Justice Cayetano Arellano and the other justices on June 17.
- The British House of Commons voted, 370 to 60, to approve a bill to provide an annual grant of £470,000 to King Edward and his family for salary and expenses; the sum was £85,000 more than had been paid the year before to Queen Victoria.
- U.S. President William McKinley issued a statement that he would not run for a third term in 1904, putting an end to rumors that had started soon after his election to a second term seven months earlier. "I regret that the suggestion of a third term has been made," he wrote. "I doubt whether I am called upon to give it notice. But there are questions of the gravest importance before the administration of the country, and their just consideration should not be prejudiced in the public mind by even the suspicion of the thought of a third term." Speculation about a Republican candidate in 1904 included Vice-President Theodore Roosevelt, Governor Benjamin Odell of New York, Governor Shelby Moore Cullom of Illinois, and Senator Charles W. Fairbanks of Indiana.
- Born: Norman Evans, English pantomime artist and radio performer; in Rochdale, Lancashire (d. 1962)
- Died: William J. Samford, 56, who had been inaugurated only six months earlier as Governor of Alabama (b. 1844)

== June 12, 1901 (Wednesday) ==
- Eighteen Australian soldiers were killed, and 42 wounded, in the Commonwealth's biggest loss of life during the Second Boer War. The members of the 5th Victorian Mounted Rifles were encamped at Steenkoolspruit, near Wilmansrust, when they became victims of an attack by 140 men.
- Cuba became a United States protectorate as the Cuban Constitutional Convention voted, 16–11, to accept the Platt Amendment without any changes. Earlier, the convention had voted 16–15 for the American-imposed legislation with qualifications, which was unacceptable to the United States.
- The Fulton, a prototype for the Holland-class submarine created by the American Electric Boat Company, was launched from the Crescent Shipyard in Elizabeth, New Jersey, in preparation for trials for observers from various nations. The experimental submarine was 63 feet (19 m) long and displaced 103 tons.
- Gregorio Cortez, a Mexican-American tenant farmer living in Karnes County, Texas, shot and killed County Sheriff W. T. "Brack" Morris, after a gunfight erupted from a mistranslation of an interrogation between the two men over a missing horse. Cortez was able to flee on foot, and eluded pursuit from two deputies. Two days later, Cortez killed Gonzales County Sheriff Robert M. Glover and Posseman Henry J. Schnabel when a posse tracked him down to another ranch, then escaped again through the desert, prompting the largest manhunt in Texas history up to that time. Cortez would become a folk hero among his fellow tejanos of Mexican descent. After his capture, he would be sentenced to life imprisonment, with some of the convictions reversed on appeal. He would eventually be pardoned in 1913. In 1983, his story would be dramatized in a film, The Ballad of Gregorio Cortez.
- Born: Arnold Kirkeby, American hotelier, art collector, and real estate investor who owned Chartwell Mansion; in Chicago (d. 1962)

== June 13, 1901 (Thursday) ==
- The London School of Economics, one of the top universities in the United Kingdom, was formally incorporated.
- As his occupation of the British Cape Colony continued, Boer General P. H. Kritzinger issued a proclamation at Stormberg, authorizing his troops to shoot any black South Africans who were riding a horse without permission from an employer, regardless of whether the rider was armed or unarmed. General Kritzinger's reasoning was that such persons could be presumed to be British spies and that they were not entitled to a trial during wartime.
- The 1901 Redpath Mansion murders occurred in Montreal as Ada Maria Mills Redpath, a 59-year old widow and her 24 year-old son Jocelyn Clifford Redpath, members of the prominent Redpath family were found shot to death in their mansion on Sherbrooke Street in Montreal's Golden Square Mile neighbourhood. The police were not called and the family hastily convened a coroner's inquest and buried the dead within 48 hours.
- Born: Tage Erlander, Prime Minister of Sweden from 1946 to 1969; in Ransäter (d. 1985)
- Died:
  - Leopoldo Alas, 49, Spanish novelist who wrote under the pen name "Clarín" (b. 1852)
  - Truman Henry Safford, 65, American mathematician and astronomer (b. 1836)

== June 14, 1901 (Friday) ==
- Elections were held in the Netherlands for the 100-seat Second Chamber of the States General (Tweede Kamer der Staten-Generaal). The Liberal Union Party and League of Free Liberals coalition, which had 48 seats before the vote, lost heavily, retaining only 22 seats. Prime Minister Nicolaas Pierson, unable to form a new government, would resign and be replaced by Abraham Kuyper of the Anti-Revolutionary Party, which had finished a close second (27.4% versus 27.6%) in the election.
- The Rockefeller Institute of Medical Research was formally incorporated in New York City; in 1965, it would adopt its present name of Rockefeller University.
- The Staten Island ferryboat Northfield, with 995 people on board, was rammed by another ferry, the Mauch Chunk. Although its hull was badly damaged, the ship made it to a pier under its own power, where the people on board were evacuated. By 6:30 p.m., only twenty minutes after it had been struck, the Northfield sank in 30-foot (9.1 m) deep water.
- Sweden reformed its system of conscription for military service, as the Parliament enacted new laws abolishing the "allotment system" that had been in place since 1683.

== June 15, 1901 (Saturday) ==
- RMS Lucania became the first ocean liner in the Cunard Line, and only the second overall, to be equipped with wireless radio.
- The city of Norwalk, Iowa, was incorporated. Although it would have a population of only 315 people in 1910, it would triple in size during the 1950s, and double again in the 1980s. One hundred years after its founding, it would have almost 7,000 people, and over 10,000 by 2015.

== June 16, 1901 (Sunday) ==
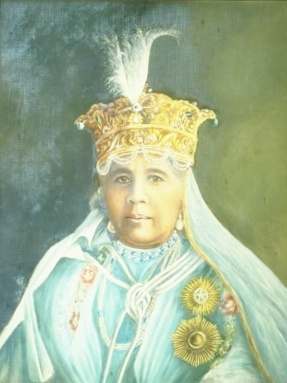
The Begum of Bhopal

- Sultan Kaikhusrau Jahan became the fourth consecutive female monarch of the Muslim princely state of Bhopal in British India, attaining the title of Begum of Bhopal upon the death of her mother, Shah Djihan, who had been crowned 33 years earlier upon the death of her mother, Sikander. The dynasty had been founded in 1819 by Sikander's mother, Qudsia. Sultan Kaikhursrau Jahan would abdicate in favor of her son, Hamidullah Khan, in 1926, bringing an end to more than a century of women rulers in the Islamic principality.
- Born: Henri Lefebvre, French Marxist philosopher and sociologist; in Hagetmau (d. 1991)
- Died: Herman Grimm, 73, German historian (b. 1828)

== June 17, 1901 (Monday) ==
- A motion in the House of Commons of the United Kingdom, condemning the British Army's incarceration of Boer civilians in concentration camps in South Africa, failed to pass by a margin of 154 to 253. The resolution had been made by MP (and future Prime Minister) David Lloyd George; almost 50 of Lloyd George's fellow Liberal Party members abstained from the vote.
- Frank Russell, a member of the House of Lords, was arrested for bigamy in London on charges that he had married an American woman while still undivorced from his English wife, Countess Russell.
- Students and teachers at the Forrestville Junior High School in Chicago reported seeing the mirage in Lake Michigan of Michigan City, Indiana, some 25 miles (40 km) distant across the water. Despite the distance, the skyline of the Indiana city "was upside down in the lake but it was recognized by several teachers familiar with the buildings of the town", and students watched the unusual image for 90 minutes from 1:00 until it faded by 2:30.
- The Klamath Indians deeded 621,824 acres of land in Oregon (or 971.6 square miles (2,516 km^{2})) to the United States in exchange for $537,007.20 payment.
- Well-known American stagecoach robber Bill Miner was released from prison in California after nearly 20 years behind bars. Although he discovered upon his release that "stagecoaches rarely carried great treasure anymore", Miner had learned techniques from new prisoners about how to rob trains. A little more than two years later, Miner would begin a new criminal career, partnering with two fellow convicts in holding up a train in Oregon. The "elder statesman of crime" would finally be put back in prison, at the age of 64, in 1911.
- Born: F. F. E. Yeo-Thomas, English World War II hero and intelligence agent; in London (d. 1964)
- Died:
  - Louis Aldrich, 58, American stage actor (b. 1843)
  - Bill Craver, 57, American baseball player who was banned for life from the National League, in 1878, for participating in the Louisville Grays scandal (b. 1844)

== June 18, 1901 (Tuesday) ==
- The ambassadors to China from the Eight-Nation Alliance voted against allowing Chinese Army soldiers to return to Beijing.
- Born:
  - Anastasia of the Romanov dynasty, daughter of Tsar Nicholas and Grand Duchess of Russia, in Saint Petersburg. Anastasia, who would be killed with her family in 1918, was the fourth daughter born to the royal family, which still did not have a son at the time. Because of a law passed in 1797, after the reign of Catherine the Great, a female could not inherit the throne and the Tsar's only living brother, Grand Duke Michael, was the next in line for succession.
  - Denis Johnston, Irish playwright; in Dublin (d. 1984)
- Died:
  - John Basil Turchin, 79, Russian-born Army officer who immigrated to the United States in 1856 as Colonel Ivan Vasilyevich Turchaninov, then joined the Union Army during the American Civil War as colonel of the 19th Illinois Infantry Regiment and retired as a brigadier general (b. 1822)
  - Hazen S. Pingree, American politician, 60, former Governor of Michigan (1897–1901) and four-term Mayor of Detroit (1889–1897), after contracting peritonitis while on an overseas vacation (b. 1840)

== June 19, 1901 (Wednesday) ==
- In celebration of the birth of his new daughter, Tsar Nicholas issued a general pardon to all students arrested during the student riots earlier in the year in Russia.
- Germany enacted its first copyright law.
- In Switzerland, it was announced that most of the original signatories to the Geneva Convention, including the United States, had accepted an invitation to confer on revisions to the international agreement on conduct of war.
- Samuel Langley and Charles M. Manly made a successful test of an unmanned one-quarter scale model of Langley's flying machine, the "Langley Aerodrome", keeping it balanced in several straight-line flights of up to 350 feet (110 m) along a remote stretch by the Potomac River. However, the aircraft's engine overheated on each occasion and could not keep a sustained flight.
- The government of Nicaragua closed all three of its national universities and accepted the resignations of their directors.
- Born: Piero Gobetti, Italian journalist and publisher who campaigned against the Fascist regime of Benito Mussolini and was forced to flee the country; in Turin (d. of a heart attack 1926)

== June 20, 1901 (Thursday) ==
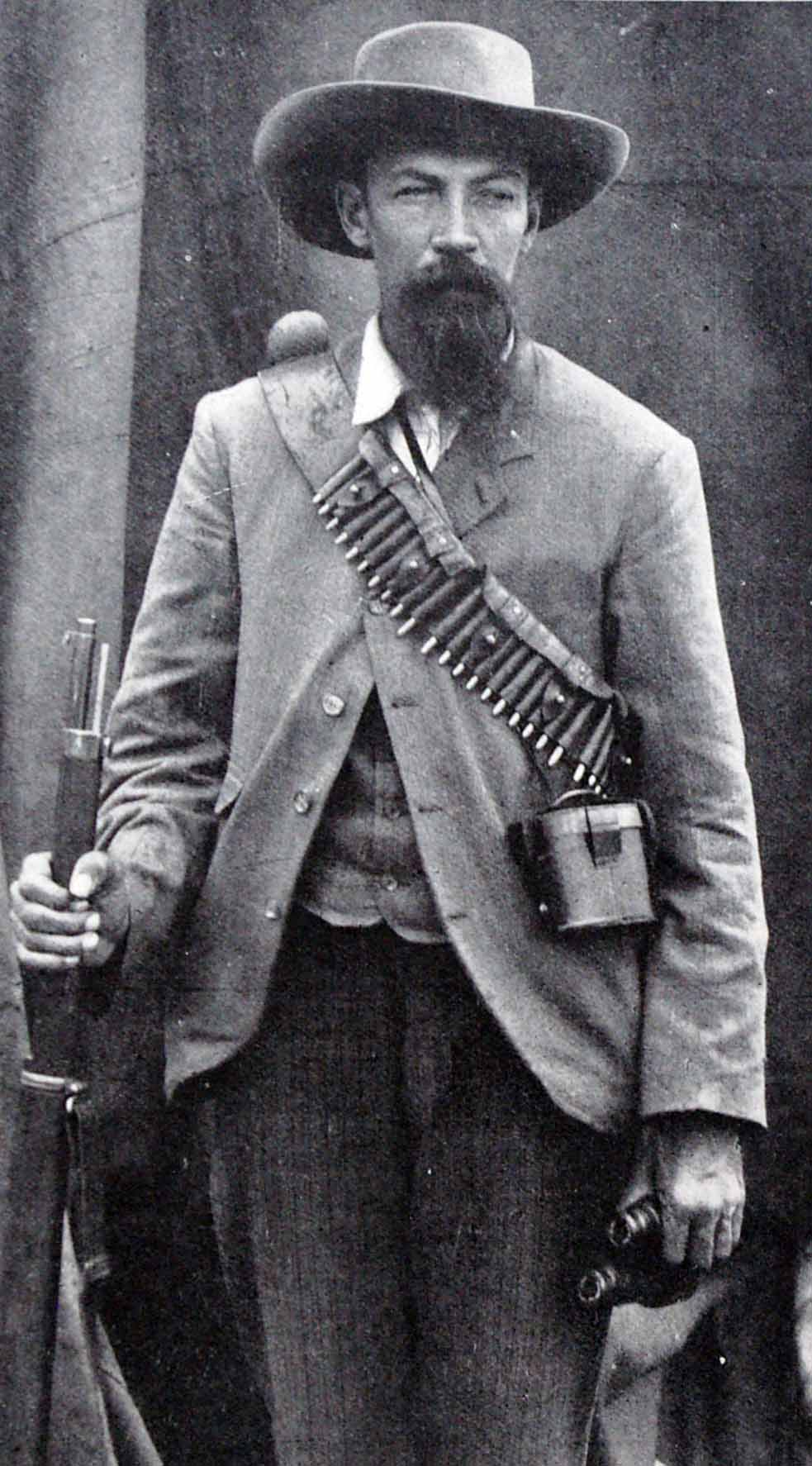
President Burger

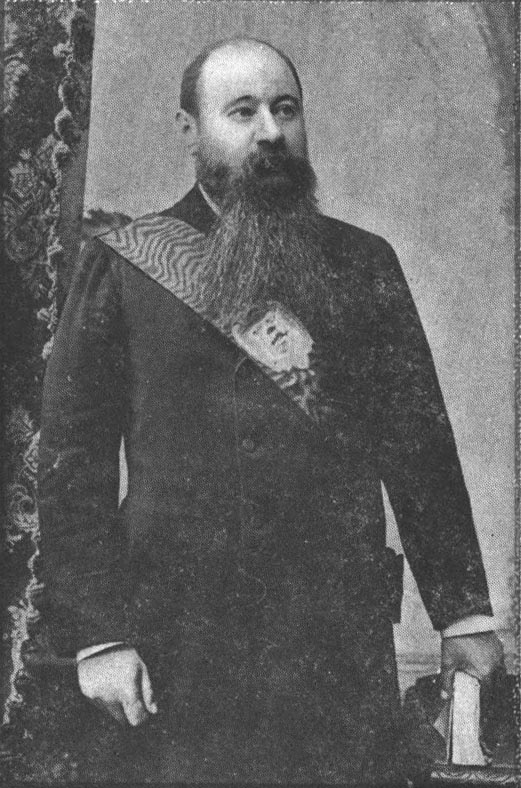
President Steyn

- The Philippine Commission voted to make English and Spanish the official languages of the Philippines for court proceedings, with the use of either being permitted. The regulation required that court records and briefs be printed in both languages. However, none of the indigenous languages (including the two with the most speakers, Tagalog and Cebuano) were official.
- President Schalk Burger of the South African Republic and President Martinus Theunis Steyn of the Orange Free State issued a joint proclamation that neither of the two nations would accept a settlement to the Second Boer War with the United Kingdom if it meant a sacrifice of the independence of their two nations.
- Honus Wagner, best known for being the subject of the most expensive baseball card in history, became the first major league baseball player to "steal home" twice during the same game. The Pittsburgh Pirates shortstop, who accomplished the feat in a game against the New York Giants, would finish as the leader in stolen bases for the National League with 49, and be the leader in 1902, 1904, 1907 and 1908 as well.
- Charlotte Maxeke became the first black South African woman to receive a university degree, albeit not in her native land, where she was denied the chance at higher education. Advocates for women's education upon their return home, she and her husband, Marshall Maxeke, were both granted Bachelor of Science degrees by Wilberforce University in Wilberforce, Ohio.
- In the world of fiction, June 20, 1901, is the birthdate of Edward Cullen, a perpetually 17-year-old vampire who is a primary character in the bestselling Twilight Saga of novels and films by Stephenie Meyer. Cullen has been portrayed on film by Robert Pattinson, who was born in 1986.

== June 21, 1901 (Friday) ==
- Seventeen people were killed in Paterson, New Jersey, after fireworks and dynamite exploded in a cellar beneath the Walker Building at 440 Main Street. The blast, which happened at 12:30 in the afternoon, blew out the front of the A. M. Rittenberg store and set fire to the building, which included apartments for 12 families. The disaster might have been even worse, because Paterson's Public School Number 3 was adjacent to the apartment building, and wreckage was hurled into the school, but most of the several hundred students had gone home for lunch.
- President McKinley issued an Executive Order establishing a civil government in the Philippines to succeed the American military government, and appointed future U.S. President William Howard Taft as the first civilian governor.
- Japanese statesman Hoshi Tōru, formerly the Speaker of Japan's House of Representatives and the Japanese Minister to the United States in the late 19th century, was stabbed to death by Iba Shotaro, a bank manager and former college dean. Hoshi was sitting at a meeting of the Tokyo Municipal Council when Shotaro entered the chamber, armed with a sword, and stabbed him twice. Shotaro wrote a letter afterward and said that Hoshi's "arbitrary and dishonest dealing and behavior" as chairman of the Tokyo City Educational Society had dishonored the office and had led him to resign from the organization; a historian would write later that "In this case, as in others which were to follow, much of the press and public sentiment was more generous to the assassin than to his victim."
- The first waters from the Colorado River arrived in the Imperial Valley in the southern California desert, 38 days after the diversion project had started on May 14, in what seemed at first to be a triumph for Canadian-born engineer George Chaffey and investor Charles R. Rockwood. who had invested in the construction of irrigation canals. Thousands of settlers would pour into the area to work on the farms that were created, and soon, "where open desert once stood, the new towns of Heber, Holtville, El Centro, Brawley, and Westmorland took root." However, Chaffey and Rockwood "had not reckoned with the inexorable tendency of a river to keep on doing what it has always done" and within three years, the canals were clogged with silt and many of the original farms were destroyed. Rockwood's California Development Company would go bankrupt, and the problem of converting the desert would not be solved until the damming of the Colorado River more than 30 years later.
- Died: Admiral Anthony Hoskins, 72, three time First Naval Lord in the United Kingdom (1880–1882, 1885–1890, and 1891–1893) (b. 1828)

== June 22, 1901 (Saturday) ==
- Laura Secord became the first woman in Canada to be honored by a public monument, when a statue of her likeness was unveiled in Niagara Falls, Ontario. During the War of 1812, Secord (a native of the United States) traveled 20 miles to alert British forces of an impending American attack that would be thwarted at the Battle of Beaver Dams; her heroism went unpublicized until after her death in 1868.
- Ten days after a manhunt had begun for Gregorio Cortez, who had killed two county sheriffs in Texas, Cortez was captured without incident, near Laredo, when his friend, Jesus Gonzalez, led lawmen to his hiding place. During the period when Cortez was on the run, at least nine Mexicans in Texas were killed in reprisals. Gonzalez received a $1,000 reward for the capture of Cortez.
- Born:
  - Charles Agnew, American dance band leader (d. 1978)
  - Hans Hinkel, film commissioner for Nazi Germany's Ministry of Propaganda as assistant to Joseph Goebbels, in Worms (d. 1960)
  - Muhammad Subuh Sumohadiwidjojo, Indonesian spiritual leader and founder of the Subud religious movement, in Kedungjati; near Semarang, Java (d. 1987)
  - Rudolf Wittkower, German-born American archaeology and art historian, in Berlin (d. 1971)

== June 23, 1901 (Sunday) ==
- Flooding in McDowell County, West Virginia, killed 36 people, primarily in the communities of Keystone and Vivian. Initial reports placed the death toll from a Sunday morning downpour at "from 300 to 400 persons".
- Born: Chuck Taylor, American basketball player and salesman; in Brown County, Indiana (d. 1969); his name continues to be immortalized on Converse tennis shoes.
- Died:
  - Adelbert Hay, 26, American consul to the South African Republic and the son of U.S. Secretary of State John Hay, was killed when he fell 60 feet (18 m) from a window of the New Haven House, a hotel in New Haven, Connecticut. The younger Hay had returned to the United States to become the private secretary to President McKinley. A graduate of Yale University, he died on the eve of the 1901 graduation ceremony.
  - Charles Kensington Salaman, 87, British composer (b. 1814)

== June 24, 1901 (Monday) ==
- Shortly before midnight, drillers struck oil in the Oklahoma Territory, at Red Fork within the Creek Indian nation, only 30 days after the Creek National Council had ratified an agreement to cede its lands to the federal government. The Sue A. Bland Number 1 well was a gusher, and transformed Tulsa, Oklahoma, from a rural frontier community into a center for oil production in the United States.
- General Juan Cailles, who had continued the Philippine resistance after the capture of Emilio Aguinaldo, surrendered to the United States along with 650 of his men. General Cailles and his army appeared at Santa Cruz in Laguna Province and, at 9:00 a.m., surrendered to U.S. Army General Samuel S. Sumner. General Cailles then led the group in taking the oath of allegiance to the United States.
- The Brighton & Hove professional soccer football team was founded by athletes meeting at the Seven Stars Pub in Brighton, England.
- Clara Maass, an American nurse at the Las Animas Hospital in Havana, Cuba, volunteered to be bitten by a mosquito infected with yellow fever in order to further the search for a vaccine to prevent the fatal disease. "Having nursed hundreds of men successfully," a biographer would note, "she appears to have believed that she was immune," but would eventually die of the disease at only 25 years old. The hospital would be renamed for her, and she would be honored decades later as a martyr to the cause of medicine, on postage stamps issued in Cuba in 1951, and in the United States in 1979.
- Born:
  - Marcel Mule, French saxophonist; in Aube, Orne département; (d. 2001)
  - Harry Partch, American composer (d. 1974)

== June 25, 1901 (Tuesday) ==
- Germán Riesco, a Liberal Party member, was elected as the new President of Chile, defeating Conservative Party challenger Pedro Monet.
- Boer armies invaded the Cape Colony and attacked the British settlement of Richmond for a day, then retreated as British forces approached.

== June 26, 1901 (Wednesday) ==
- After a two-day trial by the French Senate, Count Eugène de Lur-Saluces was found guilty of high treason and sentenced to five years' banishment from France. The next day, two of the Senators, Louis Aucoin and Louis Le Prevost du Launay, faced off in a duel over de Launay's remark to a friend that Aucoin "c'est un grotesque". The two men met for the duel, which featured gunshots "being exchanged without result", and a declaration "that the honor of the participants had been satisfied."
- The Inheritors, a "quasi-science fiction novel" by Joseph Conrad and Ford Madox Ford (under his real name as Ford M. Hueffer), was published. Despite the fame of both authors, their first collaborative effort was a critical and commercial failure.
- Born:
  - Jean Boyer, French film director; in Paris (d. 1965)
  - Stuart Symington, American businessman and U.S. Senator for Missouri, 1953–1976; in Amherst, Massachusetts (d. 1988)

== June 27, 1901 (Thursday) ==
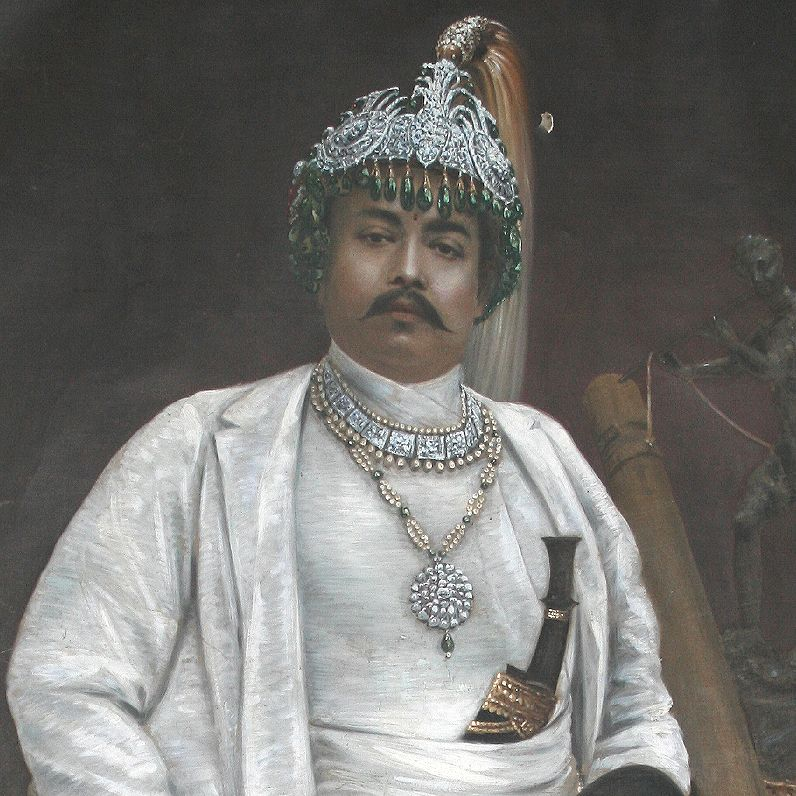
Deposed with astrology

- Dev Shumsher was deposed after only 144 days as Prime Minister of Nepal, in a plot led by his brothers, who consulted with astrologers to arrange for the best time to carry out the coup. When Dev Shumsher arrived at the palace, an army contingent was waiting below, and the brothers asked King Prithvi Bir Bikram Shah to announce that Chandra Shumsher was to become the new Prime Minister. The King declined, so another brother, Fatte Shumsher, shouted to the troops "We are deposing Dev Shumsher. Chandra Shumsher has become the prime minister and Maharaja from today. Offer him the salute." When the commanders refused to obey the order, a fourth brother, Bhim Shumsher, pulled out his revolver, pointed it at the King, and reportedly said, "Tell the army officers, and fast. Otherwise, we will be forced to shoot you." The King of Nepal complied, and told the commanders to salute the new Prime Minister. Chandra also forced the King, at gunpoint, to affix the royal handprint on the official document making him prime minister. Dev was exiled the next day, and Chandra Shumsher would serve as Prime Minister until his death in 1929.
- The Seventh National Bank in New York City failed, closing its doors only 40 minutes after it had opened. The order of closure was made by Charles G. Dawes, the Comptroller of the Currency, after the bank officials were unable to give assurances that they would have $1,000,000 in cash by June 29 in order to make good on a loan to the Henry Marquand & Co. firm.
- Born: Merle Tuve, American physicist whose application of radio waves provided the theoretical foundation for the development of radar; in Canton, South Dakota (d. 1982)

== June 28, 1901 (Friday) ==
- Prime Minister Nicolaas Pierson of the Netherlands and his entire cabinet resigned following the Liberal Union party's loss of seats in the June 14 elections.
- The proclamation of King Edward, declaring that his coronation would take place in June, 1902 was read aloud to crowds in a traditional ceremony to crowds, starting with the Norroy and Ulster King of Arms, William Weldon, who read the announcement from the balcony at St James's Palace after four state trumpeters sounded "a protracted fanfare". Weldon and a group of royal ceremonial mace bearers, heralds, noblemen, and others marched to the Temple Bar and then the Royal Exchange, where the readings were performed again.
- At the British Museum, a group of 25 distinguished scholars (Museum Director Edward Maunde Thompson and eight professors each from London, Oxford and Cambridge) met and resolved to form a society for historical, philosophical and philological studies, which would eventually be charted in 1902 as the British Academy.
- Lightning strikes across the Midwestern United States killed four farm workers near Brazil, Indiana, who were struck by a bolt after taking refuge inside a barn and "Ella", a performing elephant for the Wallace Circus, during a stop in Eau Claire, Wisconsin. The previous afternoon, semi-pro baseball player Morris Carlson was struck and killed by a bolt while he was standing at first base during a game in Monroe Center, Illinois. Carlson, a first baseman for the visiting Rockford team, had just retired the first Monroe Center batter and was struck while awaiting the next player.
- Born: Alfred Müller-Armack, German economist; in Essen (d. 1978)

== June 29, 1901 (Saturday) ==
- The world's first six-masted schooner, the George W. Wells, and the only other six-master in the world, the Eleanor Percy, collided off the coast of Cape Cod in the Atlantic Ocean during fair weather. Describing the event as "an astonishing coincidence", author Ingrid Grenon would later write, "One wonders what forces of nature contributed to this chance meeting. Whether it was the temperament of the evening wind, the alignment of the moon and stars or just plain happenstance, the two wooden ships crashed into each other." Both had to be repaired in the Boston Harbor.
- HMS Maine was presented by the Atlantic Transport Line to the Royal Navy to become Britain's first permanent hospital ship. Before that time, such ships were outfitted solely for wartime use.
- Henri Fournier won the three day automobile race from Paris to Berlin, covering 743 miles in 17 hours.
- Tsar Nicholas followed the suggestion of his minister of war, Aleksey Kuropatkin, and confirmed a law incorporating residents of the Grand Duchy of Finland into the Russian Army.
- Horniman Museum in Forest Hill, south London, was opened to the public by founder and tea trader Frederick Horniman, as a gift 'to the people in perpetuity'
- Born: Nelson Eddy, American singer and actor; in Olneyville, Rhode Island (d. 1967)
- Died:
  - Albery Allson Whitman, 50, African-American poet acclaimed as "The Poet Laureate of the Negro Race", of pneumonia (b. 1851)
  - Francis J. Birtwell, a 20-year-old ornithologist and an author of numerous articles about species of birds, was killed in a freak accident while working on writing a book titled The Ornithology of New Mexico. Birtwell was on his honeymoon at the Rio Pecos Forest Reserve near Glorieta, New Mexico, and had used lineman's spurs and a rope to climb 75 up a tree to observe a bird's nest. As he descended, he got caught in a loop from the rope and was strangled to death in front of his wife and two witnesses.

== June 30, 1901 (Sunday) ==
- With the Spanish–American War and the Philippine insurgency at an end, the last volunteer troops in the United States Army were mustered out of the service. During the war, as many as 35,000 officers and men had participated in "volunteer units" in each of the states, and most of them had "returned to civil life". The Executive Order of disbandment was made under the Army Reorganization Law that had taken effect in February. At the Presidio of San Francisco, four regiments totaling 4,000 troops were retired from the United States Army in an afternoon ceremony.
- Born: Will Herberg, Russian-born American political activist who broke with the Communist Party USA in the late 1920s and founded the leftist Independent Labor League of America; in Lyakhavichy, Russian Empire (d. 1977)
