= Aleotti =

Aleotti is an Italian surname. Notable people with the surname include:

- Alessandro Aleotti (born 1972), Italian singer
- Antonio Aleotti (died 1527), Italian painter
- Giovan Battista Aleotti (1546–1636), Italian architect
- Giovanni Aleotti (born 1999), Italian cyclist
- Massimiliana Landini Aleotti (born 1942), Italian co-owner of pharmaceutical company Menarini
- Raffaella Aleotti, thought to be the same person as Vittoria Aleotti, below
- Vittoria Aleotti (c. 1575–1620), Italian nun, composer and organist

== See also ==
- Aliotti
