= Nicola Abbagnano =

Italian existential philosopher (1901-1990)

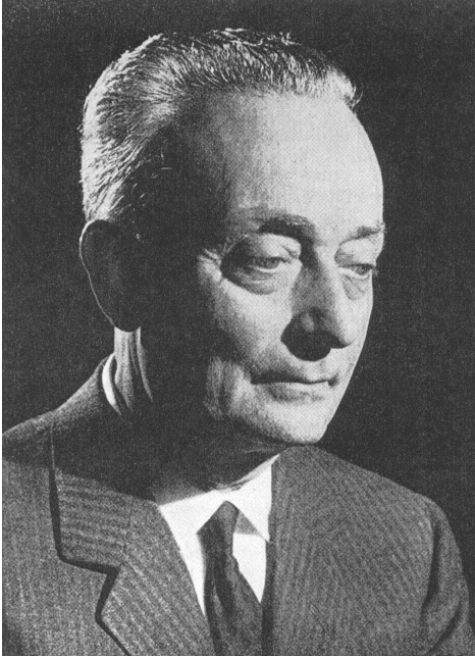
- Born: 15 July 1901; Salerno, Kingdom of Italy
- Died: 9 September 1990 (aged 89); Milan, Italy

Education
- Academic advisor: Antonio Aliotta

Philosophical work
- Era: 20th-century philosophy
- Region: Western philosophy
- School: Existentialism
- Main interests: Existentialism; philosophy of science; history of philosophy; sociology
- Notable ideas: Positive existentialism

Nicola Abbagnano (Italian: [niˈkɔːla abbaɲˈɲaːno]; 15 July 1901 – 9 September 1990) was an Italian existential philosopher.

== Life ==
Nicola Abbagnano was born in Salerno on 15 July 1901. He was the first-born son of a middle-class professional family. His father was a practicing lawyer in the area. He studied in Naples, and in November 1922 obtained a degree in philosophy, his thesis became the subject of his first book, Le sorgenti irrazionali del pensiero (1923). His mentor was Antonio Aliotta. In the following years, he taught philosophy and history at the Liceo Umberto I°, in Naples, and from 1917 to 1936 he was the professor of philosophy and pedagogy in the Istituto di Magistero Suor Orsola Benincasa. At the same time, he actively contributed as secretary of the editorial staff to the review of Logos, edited by his mentor Aliotta. From 1936 to 1976, he was a full professor of history of philosophy, and then in 1939 he was appointed to a full-time professorship at the Faculty of Letters and Philosophy at the University of Turin.

Immediately after World War II, he helped found the Centro di studi metodologici in Turin. With his student, Franco Ferrarotti, Abbagnano founded in 1950 the Quaderni di sociologia, and in 1952 he was joint editor with Norberto Bobbio of the Rivista di filosofia. Then from 1952 to 1960 he inspired a group of scholars for a "New Enlightenment," and organized a series of conventions attended by the philosophers who were engaged in the construction of a "lay" philosophy and who were interested in the main trends of the foreign philosophical thought. In 1964, he began his contributions to the Turin newspaper La Stampa. In 1972, he moved to Milan and discontinued his contributions to La Stampa, but began writing for Indro Montanelli's Giornale. In Milan, he held the office of Town Councillor, elected from the lists of the Liberal Party, and was also the Councillor of Culture. He died on 9 September 1990, and was buried in the cemetery of Santa Margherita Ligure, the Riviera town where he had spent his vacations for many years.

== Works ==
During the Neapolitan period, Abbagnano's theoretical work is represented by Le sorgenti irrazionali del pensiero (1923), as well as Il problema dell'arte (1925), La fisica nuova (1934) e Il principio della metafisica (1936). These works are all influenced by the teaching of Aliotta, who encouraged Abbagnano's interest in the methodological problems of science. Equally influential was the anti-idealist controversy that is particularly evident in his volume on art. After moving to Turin, Abbagnano turned to the study of existentialism, which by this time was also the interest of the general Italian philosophical culture. He formulated an original version of existentialism in his widely recognized book, La struttura dell'esistenza (1939), which was followed by his Introduzione all'esistenzialismo (1942) and a set of essays collected in Filosofia religione scienza (1947) and by Esistenzialismo positivo (1948). In 1943, he played a very important part in the debate on existentialism that appeared in Primato, the review of the fascist opposition led by Giuseppe Bottai.

In the first years after the war, Abbagnano's interest turned to American pragmatism. Above all is the version offered by John Dewey to the philosophy of science and to neopositivism. In existentialism, having freed himself from the negative implications he found in Heidegger, in Jaspers, in Sartre, in Dewey's pragmatism and in neopositivism, Abagnano saw the signs of a new philosophical trend, that he called a "New Enlightenment" in an article written in 1948. The development of this idea in the fifties was precisely characterized both by his interest in science, in particular, sociology, and by an attempt to define the program of a philosophy, that he first called a "New Enlightenment" and later a "methodological empirism". During this period essays were collected in Possibilità e libertà (1956) and in Problemi di sociologia (1959) but, one of his most important works is the Dizionario di filosofia (1961), a true "summa" meant to clarify the principal concepts of philosophy.

Besides his volumes and essays of theoretical character, Nicola Abbagnano published many historical monographs since youth, including Il nuovo idealismo inglese e americano (1927), La filosofia di E. Meyerson e la logica dell'identità (1929), Guglielmo d'Ockham (1933), La nozione del tempo secondo Aristotele (1933), Bernardino Telesio (1941). His major historiographic work is found in the Storia della filosofia published by UTET (1946–1950), which was preceded by the Compendio di storia della filosofia (1945–1947), which was closer to a textbook. A few years later, the latter was followed by a collection entitled Storia delle scienze, which he coordinated for UTET (1962). Abbagnano defined his philosophy as "positive existentialism". His "philosophy of possible" condemned other existentialists for either denying human possibility or exaggerating it. In his later work, he tended to adopt a more naturalistic and scientific approach to philosophy. Some of his writings were translated into English in Critical Existentialism (ed. by Nino Langiulli, 1969).

His work in the last decades, starting from 1965 on, mainly consists of articles appearing in La Stampa and in Giornale that were later assembled in different collections, Per o contro l'uomo (1968), Fra il tutto e il nulla (1973), Questa pazza filosofia (1979), L'uomo progetto Duemila (1980), La saggezza della vita (1985), La saggezza della filosofia (1987). His last book, written a few months before his death, is the autobiographical text Ricordi di un filosofo (1990).

== Selected bibliography ==
- Le sorgenti irrazionali del pensiero, Napoli, 1923
- Il problema dell'arte, Napoli, 1925
- Il nuovo idealismo inglese e americano, Napoli, 1927
- La filosofia di E. Meyerson e la logica dell'identità, Napoli-Città di Castello, 1929
- Guglielmo di Ockham, Lanciano, 1931
- La nozione del tempo secondo Aristotele, Lanciano, 1933
- La fisica nuova. Fondamenti di una nuova teoria della scienza, Napoli, 1934
- Il principio della metafisica, Napoli, 1936
- La struttura dell'esistenza, Torino, 1939
- Bernardino Telesio e la filosofia del Rinascimento, Milano, 1941
- Introduzione all'esistenzialismo, Milano, 1942
- Filosofia religione scienza, Torino, 1947
- L'esistenzialismo positivo, Torino, 1948
- Possibilità e libertà, Torino, 1956
- Storia della filosofia, Torino, 1966
- Per o contro l'uomo, Milano, 1968
- Fra il tutto e il nulla, Milano, 1973
- Questa pazza filosofia ovvero l'Io prigioniero, Milano, 1979
- La saggezza della filosofia. I problemi della nostra vita, Milano, 1987
- Dizionario di filosofia, Torino, 1987
- Ricordi di un filosofo, Milano, 1990
- Scritti neoilluministici, Torino, 2001
