= Tim Alioto =

American soccer player (born 1958)

Personal information
- Date of birth: May 20, 1958 (age 68)
- Place of birth: Milwaukee, Wisconsin, United States
- Height: 5 ft 10 in (1.78 m)
- Position: Defender

Youth career
- 1974–1978: Milwaukee Bavarians

Senior career*
Years	Team	Apps	(Gls)
1978–1986	Milwaukee Bavarians		
1986–1987	Milwaukee Serbians		
1986–1990	Milwaukee Wave (indoor)	111	(19)
1990–1993	Milwaukee Bavarians		
- * Club domestic league appearances and goals

Tim Alioto (born May 20, 1958) is an American retired soccer defender who spent most of his career with the amateur Milwaukee Bavarians. He played professionally for four years in the American Indoor Soccer Association.

In 1968, Alioto began his youth career with a Salvation Army team. In 1974, he joined the Milwaukee Bavarians. In 1976, Alioto graduated from Madison High School. He had played high school soccer as a sophomore, but stopped playing for his high school team after joining the Bavarians. In 1977, the Bavarians went to the final of the McGuire Cup where they fell to the Santa Ana Broncos. Alioto did not attend college and remained played for the Bavarians senior team with short stints with the Milwaukee Sports Club and Milwaukee Serbians (1986–1987). In 1986, Alioto turned professional with the Milwaukee Wave of the American Indoor Soccer Association. The team released him at during the 1990 off-season and Alioto once again returned to the Bavarians. In 1993, Alioto and his teammates lost in the semifinals of the 1993 U.S. Open Cup.

In 2007, the Wisconsin Soccer Association inducted Alioto into its Hall of Fame.
