= Eliseo Vivas =

American philosopher (1901–1991)

- Born: July 13, 1901; Pamplona, Colombia
- Died: August 28, 1991 (aged 90)

Philosophical work
- Era: 20th-century philosophy
- Region: Western philosophy, literary criticism

Eliseo Vivas (July 13, 1901 – August 28, 1991) was a 20th-century philosopher and literary theorist.

As a child, his family fled Colombia in response to the presidency of Cipriano Castro. They went to Curacao, then Paris, then, in 1915, to New York City. Vivas served as the Venezuelan consul in Philadelphia, then turned to academia studying or teaching at, among other schools, the University of Wisconsin, the University of Chicago, Ohio State University, Northwestern University, Rockford College, and the University of Iowa.

Vivas's philosophy was essentially conservative, and he relied on poetry as metaphysics while abandoning naturalism. He arrived at his conclusions after trying on many schools, "from Marxism to conservatism, and from naturalism to value realism."

His papers are collected by Northwestern University.

== Books ==
- 1950 The Moral and the Ethical Life
- 1955 Creation and Discovery
- 1960 D. H. Lawrence, the Failure and the Triumph of Art
- 1963 The Artistic Transaction and Essays on Theory of Literature
- 1971 Contra Marcuse
- 1979 Two Roads to Ignorance
