= Maurice Alliot =

French Egyptologist

Maurice Alliot (24 September 1903 – 22 October 1960) was a French Egyptologist. He was a professor of Egyptology at Lyons (from 1937) and Paris (from 1953).

Under the French Institute of Oriental Archaeology from 1930, he participated in excavations of Deir el-Medina and Edfu, the latter of which he wrote two volumes about.

== Biography ==
He studied at the Charlemagne and Louis-le-Grand high schools and in 1923 became a student at the École Normale Supérieure.A resident of the French Institut Français d'Archéologie Orientale from 1930, he took part in excavations at Deir el-Medina and Edfu (1931-1933), where he discovered a Pharaonic settlement and an Old Kingdom of Egypt necropolis beneath the Roman and Greek cities.

He then studied the texts on the walls of the Temple of Edfu and devoted his doctoral thesis, which he defended in Paris in 1945, to the cult of Horus.
