= Marialuisa Aliotta =

Italian astrophysicist

Marialuisa Aliotta FRSE is an Italian experimental nuclear astrophysicist whose research uses particle accelerators located deep underground to investigate the nuclear reactions within stars, nucleosynthesis, and the connections between these reactions and the lifetime and evolution of stars. She is a professor at the University of Edinburgh, where she holds a personal chair in experimental nuclear astrophysics.

== Education and career ==
As an undergraduate at the University of Catania, Aliotta spent a year as an Erasmus scholar at the University of Oxford. She earned a laurea, summa cum laude, from the University of Catania in 1993. Continuing at the University of Catania, with another year abroad at Ruhr University Bochum, she completed her PhD in 1999.

She returned to Ruhr University Bochum as an Alexander von Humboldt Post-Doctoral Fellow, and then in 2001 took a position as a lecturer at the University of Edinburgh. She was promoted to senior lecturer in 2008 and reader in 2013, and given a personal chair as full professor in 2016.

== Book ==
Beyond astrophysics, Aliotta is the author of the textbook Mastering Academic Writing in the Sciences: A Step-by-Step Guide (CRC Press, 2018).

== Recognition ==
Aliotta was the 2021 winner of the Giuseppe Occhialini Medal and Prize, given jointly by the Institute of Physics and by the Italian Physical Society to researchers based in the UK and Italy. She was elected to the Fellowship of the Royal Society of Edinburgh in 2022.
