= 1901 Redpath Mansion murders =

Event in Montreal, Quebec, Canada

On June 13, 1901, two members of the prominent Redpath family were found shot to death in their mansion on Sherbrooke Street in Montreal's Golden Square Mile neighbourhood. Among the dead were Ada Maria Mills Redpath, a 59-year old widow and her 24-year-old son Jocelyn Clifford Redpath. It is not known who committed the murder as the police were not called and the family hastily convened a coroner's inquest. The two were buried within 48 hours. Speculation has persisted into the 2020s about the events.

The "Great Unsolved Mysteries in Canadian History" project included the event in their interactive history series. Numerous podcasts have covered the events, including Stuff You Missed in History Class.

== Victims ==
The 59-year-old Ada Maria Mills Redpath was the daughter of the former Montreal Mayor John Easton Mills and his wife Hannah Lyman. In 1867, Ada married John James Redpath, who worked at his family's sugar refinery, but later left the refinery to join the Victoria Rifles of Canada. John James would die in 1884, leaving Ada a widow for 17 years until the time of her murder.

Jocelyn Clifford Redpath was the son of John James and Ada. At the time of the murder, Clifford was 24 years old.
