= Bonaventura Aliotti =

Italian Franciscan friar, organist, and composer

Bonaventura Aliott
- Born: 1640; Palermo, Sicily, Crown of Aragon
- Died: 1690 (aged 49–50)
- Occupation: Franciscan friar Organist Composer.

Bonaventura Aliotti, O.F.M., (1640 in Palermo – 1690), was an Italian Franciscan friar, organist and composer.

Aliotti, also known as Padre Palermino, worked in Palermo and like his teacher Giovanni Battista Fasolo belonged to the Franciscan Order. In 1671 he moved to Padua and then in 1674 to Ferrara as organist of the lay confraternity Confraternita della Morte. Four of his eleven oratorios survive.

== Works ==
- Il Sansone (1686)
- Il Trionfo della morte per il peccato d’Adamo (1685)
- Santa Rosalia (1687)
