= Massimo Alioto =

Italian academic

Massimo Alioto (born in Brescia, Italy, in 1972) is a professor in the Department of Electrical and Computer Engineering at the National University of Singapore. He was named Fellow of the Institute of Electrical and Electronics Engineers (IEEE) in 2016, for contributions to energy-efficient VLSI circuits.

== Education ==
Alioto received the Laurea (MSc) degree in Electronics Engineering and the Ph.D. degree in Electrical Engineering from the University of Catania (Italy) in 1997 and 2001, respectively.
