= Aliotti =

Aliotti is an Italian surname. Notable people with the surname include:

- Bonaventura Aliotti (1640–1690), Italian Franciscan friar, organist and composer
- Gina Aliotti (born 1984), American figure competitor
- Nick Aliotti (born 1954), American football coach
- Pietro Giovanni Aliotti (died 1563), Italian Roman Catholic bishop

== See also ==
- Aliotta
