= Antonio Aliotta =

Italian philosopher (1881-1964)

Antonio Aliotta (18 January 1881 – 1 February 1964) was an Italian philosopher.

== Biography ==
He was born in Palermo and studied philosophy at the University of Florence, graduating in 1903. His initial work was in experimental psychology. In 1912 he won the Paladin prize for his work, La reazione idealistica contro la scienza. He became professor of theoretical philosophy at the University of Padua from 1913 to 1919, then served as a professor at the University of Naples until 1951. Aliotta supervised Nicola Abbagnano's laurea thesis.

Aliotta died in Naples.
