= Luxton =

Surname

== Surname ==
Arts and entertainment
- Bill Luxton (actor), (1927–2019), Canadian actor and broadcaster
- Charlie Luxton (born 1974), architectural designer and television presenter
- J. Luxton, composer of "Battle in the Sky" (1915) and "The Battle of the Marne" (1916), published by Church, Paxson & Co.
- Phillip Luxton (born 1959), New Zealand ceramicist
- Steve Luxton, (born 1946), is a Canadian-based poet of Ayer's Cliff, Quebec
History
- Frances, Robbie, and Alan Luxton (died 1975), English siblings whose deaths were ruled at inquest to be murder and suicides, a finding that has remained disputed (see West Chapple Farm tragedy)
Military
- Daniel Aston Luxton (1891–1960), Australian Army brigadier general
- Mat Luxton (1844–1924), Confederate-American raider
Public service and community
- Bill Luxton (1940–1924), Falkland Islands politician
- Cameron Luxton (born 1988 or 1989), New Zealand politician
- Sir Harold Luxton (1888–1957), Australian politician
- Jack Luxton (1923–2005), dairy farmer and New Zealand politician
- Jo Luxton (born 1973), New Zealand politician
- John Luxton (1946–2021), former New Zealand National Party politician
- Norman Luxton (1876–1962), Canadian Rockies pioneer and Banff civic leader
- William Fisher Luxton (1844–1907), Canadian newspaper publisher and politician
Religion
- George Nasmith Luxton (1901–1970), Canadian Anglican bishop of Huron
Sports
- Charles Luxton (1861–1918), English clergyman and cricketer
- Lewis Luxton CBE (1910–1985), Australian sports administrator
- Stefi Luxton (born 1991), snowboarder from New Zealand
- Will Luxton (born 2003), English cricketer

== Given name ==
- Sir Percy John Luxton Kelland (1878–1958), British veterinarian and Chief Veterinary Officer

== Places ==
Canada
- Buffalo Nations Luxton Museum, an Indigenous history and cultural museum in Banff, Alberta
- Luxton, a historic neighbourhood and community in Langford, Greater Victoria, British Columbia, centered around the intersection of Happy Valley Road and Luxton Road (see Langford, British Columbia § Neighbourhoods)
- Luxton, Saskatchewan, a ghost town and railway point in Saskatchewan (see List of communities in Saskatchewan § Ghost towns)
- Luxton Lake (Nova Scotia), a lake in Kejimkujik National Park, Annapolis County, Nova Scotia
- Luxton School, a public elementary school in Winnipeg
United Kingdom
- Luxton, a fictional town in Essex, England, the setting of the British television sitcom On the Buses (1969–1973)
United States
- Luxton Lake, formerly known as Lucky Lake, in Narrowsburg, New York

== See also ==
- Laxton
- Lexton
- Loxton
- Luxon (surname)
- Luxton at Wiktionary
