= Laxton (surname) =

Laxton is a surname that was prominent in the Anglo-Saxon period of English history. During this era many in the populace would take their surname from the region in which they resided. Laxton, the surname, is associated with the location of Laxton, which is in the Yorkshire area of North East England, and has an equal historical association in Nottinghamshire, pre-dating the 1066 invasion of William the Conqueror and subsequent full country census. There is a village called Laxton in Nottinghamshire.

== List of persons with the surname ==
- Brett Laxton – Major League Baseball pitcher
- Charlie Laxton – Australian rules footballer
- Gordon Laxton – Canadian ice hockey goaltender
- Harry Laxton – Australian rules footballer
- James Laxton – American cinematographer
- Richard Laxton – British film director
- Robert Laxton – Former Labour MP for Derby North
- Reg and Cyril Laxton – British swimming and diving coaches
- William Laxton – British surveyor and author
- William Laxton – Lord Mayor of London during the reign of Henry VIII
- Edward and William Laxton - English horticulturists
