= See Magazine =

Canadian magazine

- Categories: alternative weekly
- Frequency: weekly
- Circulation: average of 20,849 copies each week (Audit Bureau of Circulations)
- First issue: July 1, 1992; 33 years ago
- Final issue: May 26, 2011; 14 years ago
- Country: Canada
- Based in: Edmonton
- Language: English
- ISSN: 1196-5347

SEE Magazine was a free alternative weekly published in Edmonton, Alberta, Canada from 1992 to 2011 first by Ron Garth, then by Great West Newspaper. It was published every Thursday, distributing an average of 20,849 copies each week at more than 1,250 locations including street boxes, libraries, and local retail stores. It covered a range of topics not typically represented through mainstream media, highlighting underrepresented artists and events.

In 2011, it was acquired by Bob Doull of Aberdeen Publishing and merged with rival alt-weekly, Vue Weekly. The last issue, issue 913, was published on May 26, 2011.

== History ==
=== Founding, 1992-1995 ===
SEE, originally known as Something's Entertaining Edmonton, was first published in the 1980s as a ponytab format (small-sized) monthly by Ron Garth. It was later merged with Edmonton Bullet, a ten-year-old biweekly run by Ron Sylvester, becoming SEE Magazine. The first issue came out on July 1, 1992. The merger led to changes in the publication schedule, increasing distribution from monthly, to biweekly to weekly.

Soon after its release, Jamison's Gazette Press began to print SEE Magazine. Gazette Press was later acquired by Great West Newspapers, LP, a St. Albert-based community newspaper group that also includes the St. Albert Gazette and Calgary’s alternative weekly Fast Forward. In 1994, SEE Magazine started accumulating massive amounts of printing debt, eventually reaching the $240,000 mark.

=== Acquisition by Great West, 1995-2011 ===
In 1995, due to its outstanding printing debts SEE was acquired by its Great West Newspapers. Garth was given a letter from Jamison, outlining the specifics of the handoff as a means to handle the debt. SEE would go into voluntary receivership and Garth would be an employee of Great West. Garth signed off on the agreement. However, instead of staying on with SEE, Garth, along with many of the original staff, jumped ship to found the rival, alternative newspaper, Vue Weekly.

On September 25, 1995, after the first issue of Vue was published, SEE filed claims against Ron Garth for damages amounting to $400,000 due to the publishing of a magazine similar in layout, design and content. The claim was adjourned and SEE was instead ordered to issue a full-page apology advertisement in their next issue.

Cover of the last SEE magazine issue from May 26, 2011. Cover assembled by Craig Janzen.

In 2005, a lawsuit was filed against SEE Magazine, along with the Canadian Revenue Agency by Ron Garth. Garth argued that SEE did not meet the requirement for the tax-breaks they were given as those were designated for Canadian-owned newspaper. As SEE was ultimately owned by Hollinger Publishing, a US-based company, they did not qualify. The claim was dismissed in 2007, as was Garth's appeal in 2009. His final appeal in 2011 was followed by a discontinuance of claim.

In 2009, the magazine became a member of the Association of Alternative Newsweeklies.

=== Merger with VUE, 2011 ===
In 2011, SEE, was acquired by Doull of Aberdeen Publishing who also acquired Vue Weekly and merged under the Vue Weekly Banner. The last issue of SEE, issue 913, was published on May 26, 2011.

The magazine's staff, upon final print, included: Jeff Holubitsky, publisher and editor; Kerry Duperron, sales manager; Craig Janzen, art director; Angela Brunschot, news and features editor; Maurice Tougas, senior writer; Curtis Wright, arts and entertainment editor; Kurt Gallop, designer; Erin Campbell, sales consultant; Andy Cookson, sales consultant; Megan Hall, sales consultant, promotions, listings; Fred Curatolo, cartoonist and distribution. The magazine's columnists included: Fish Griwkowsky, Scott Lingley, Darren Zenko, Trent Wilkie, Maurice Tougas, and Angela Brunschot.

== Content ==
Throughout its run, SEE provided regular coverage of local artists, shows and events, including previews and reviews for performances, films, CDs and artists. It also featured a number of special sections, pullouts, guides and issues. These special features often covered festivals, the latest in fashion, education, books, music, and gifts, and special themes. Some of these features included:

- The Best of Edmonton
- Fringe Festival coverage
- Great West Newspaper's Guide to Education
- Gift Guides
- Special theme issues
- Seasonal Fashion sections
- Seasonal Reading section

SEE was a regular sponsor of local arts events in Edmonton, including Edmonton Opera, local theatre groups and others.

== Awards ==
SEE Magazine awards include:

- Cover Design, circulation under 50,000 — 2010 Alt Weekly Awards;
- Best Coverage of the Arts — 2010 Better Newspapers Competition, Canadian Community Newspapers Association;
- Certificate of Excellence, second place, best environmental writing — 2010 Better Newspapers Competition, Canadian Community Newspapers Association;
- Certificate of Excellence, second place, best photo essay — 2010 Better Newspapers Competition, Canadian Community Newspapers Association;
- Mayor's Award For Sustained Support of the Arts — 2009 Mayor's Celebration of the Arts.

== See also ==
- List of Canadian magazines
