= Rocky Mountain Outlook =

Canadian local newspaper in Alberta

- Type: Weekly newspaper
- Format: Tabloid
- Owner: Great West Newspapers
- Publisher: Cheryl Fraser
- Editor: Jordan Small
- Founded: September 20, 2001; 24 years ago
- Language: English
- Headquarters: 201, 1001 6 Ave. Canmore, Alberta, T1W 2V3
- Circulation: 9,000
- Website: www.rmoutlook.com

The Rocky Mountain Outlook is a weekly local newspaper based in Canmore, Alberta, Canada. The Rocky Mountain Outlook is delivered across the Bow Valley in Banff, Canmore, Lake Louise, the Municipal District of Bighorn and the Stoney Nakoda First Nation. The paper covers news in and around the Bow Valley region, which spans from Lake Louise in the west to the Îyârhe (Stoney) Nakoda First Nation and Kananaskis Country in the east. The paper does not charge readers and relies on advertising for income.

== History ==
The Rocky Mountain Outlook was officially launched on September 20, 2001. It was created and financed by longtime residents Larry Marshall, Bob Schott and Carol Picard and joined the Canmore Leader and the Banff Crag and Canyon as newspapers in the Bow Valley. Schott became the sales manager, Picard – a former editor of the Canmore Leader – was named the editor and Marshall, who was a former managing editor of both the Canmore Leader and Banff Crag and Canyon, was the publisher.

The newspaper joined the Canadian Community Newspaper Association and Alberta Weekly Newspaper Association in 2004 and the paper was sold to Black Press Media in 2005. The newspaper was purchased by Great West Newspapers from Black Press Media in 2010.

== Readership ==
The Rocky Mountain Outlook is available throughout the Bow Valley region of Alberta. It is available for pick-up in Canmore, Banff, Exshaw, Mînî Thnî (Morley) and Lake Louise at more than 200 locations. The readership is primarily in southern Alberta. The newspaper is released every Thursday and there is also a Monday to Friday newsletter delivered via email each evening.

== Newsroom ==
The Rocky Mountain Outlook is based in Canmore at 1001 6 Avenue and the newsroom is in the building's second floor. The newspaper has editorial and advertising staff. The editor is Jordan Small and the publisher is Cheryl Fraser.

The newspaper has been recognized both provincially and nationally at the Alberta Weekly Newspaper Association awards, the Canadian Association of Journalists awards, the News Photographers Association of Canada, the Canadian Community Newspaper Association awards, the Canadian Journalism Foundation awards and the National Newspaper Awards. Staff has been recognized for news, sports, Indigenous and political coverage and photography work. The newspaper received the best all-round newspaper award from the Canadian Community Newspaper Association for circulation between 6,500–12,499 in 2019.

== See also ==
- List of newspapers in Canada
- List of newspapers in Alberta
- Media in Alberta
- Media in Banff, Alberta
