= News Leader =

News Leader may refer to:

- The News Leader, a daily newspaper in Staunton, Virginia
- The News-Leader (Fernandina Beach, Florida), a twice weekly newspaper in Fernandina Beach, Florida
- Burnaby News Leader, a weekly newspaper in Burnaby, British Columbia
- The Cleveland News Leader, a former newspaper in Cleveland, Mississippi
- The Richmond News Leader, a former daily newspaper in Richmond, Virginia
- Similkameen News Leader, a weekly newspaper for the Similkameen Valley
- Springfield News-Leader, a daily newspaper in Springfield, Missouri
- Terrell County News-Leader, a former newspaper in Sanderson, Texas
