= Horace Edgar Buckridge =

Australian explorer (1877–1903)

Buckridge holding puppies during the Discovery Expedition in Antarctica.

Horace Edgar Buckridge (1877 – 7 December 1903) was an English-born Australian soldier and explorer. A veteran of the Second Boer War and former laboratory assistant with the Discovery Expedition, Buckridge died at sea while attempting to sail from New Zealand to London.

After emigrating to Australia from England, Buckridge served for a year in the Second Boer War with the New South Wales Imperial Bushmen, attaining the rank of Sergeant-Major. He then joined the Discovery Expedition at Simons Bay, Cape Town, South Africa. While in Antarctica, Buckridge played the role of Mrs Quiver in Ticket of Leave, an adaptation of a Victorian farce by Watts Phillips believed to be the first play ever performed in Antarctica. Buckridge received a commendation from Robert Falcon Scott for saving another person's life.

Buckridge took part in several sledging journeys with the expedition, including a journey of over seven weeks led by Lt. Albert Armitage. He was then assigned laboratory duty, which kept him aboard ship for 11 hours a day. He began to find the experience monotonous. In March 1903 he left the Expedition, sailing to Lyttelton, New Zealand aboard the Morning. He then joined the crew of the Tilikum, a so-called "Indian war canoe" that was attempting a circumnavigation of the Earth under Captain John Voss.

Buckridge soon commissioned the construction of his own yacht, the Kia Ora, with the intent of sailing around the world. After the launching of the Kia Ora on 14 October 1903, Buckridge set sail from New Zealand for London with a companion named Sowden, who had no prior sailing experience. While at sea, Buckridge was injured aboard the yacht near the Chatham Islands. Sowden failed to help him, and Buckridge died at sea on 7 December 1903. Sowden returned to New Zealand alone. The court which held an inquiry into Buckridge's death concluded "that the account by Sowden, the survivor, of the circumstances attending Buckridge's death, was extraordinary and unsatisfactory." Buckridge was buried at sea.
