= Vue Weekly =

Alternative weekly newspaper (1995–2018)

- First issue cover, 1995
- Categories: Alternative weekly
- Frequency: Weekly
- Circulation: Average of 23,280 copies each week (Alliance for Audited Media)
- First issue: September 15, 1995
- Final issue: November 29, 2018
- Company: Postvue Publishing Inc.
- Country: Canada
- Based in: Edmonton
- Language: English

Vue Weekly was an alternative weekly newspaper published in Edmonton, Alberta, Canada, with issues released every Thursday. It covered topics on artists and events that are often ignored, marginalized, or misrepresented by the mainstream media and aimed to bring balance to Edmonton's media mosaic.

== History ==
Vue was founded in 1995 by former employees and owners of See Magazine, who were upset over losing control of See to its publisher, Great West Newspaper. Vue was partly owned by The Georgia Straight for a brief time, then was 100% independently owned by Ronald Garth for several years. Vue had a long-standing rivalry with its competitor See Magazine. In 2005 Vue Weekly publisher, Ron Garth filed a lawsuit against the Canadian Revenue Agency for giving tax breaks, which were designed for Canadian-owned newspapers, to its rival See because See's parent company was ultimately owned by US-based Hollinger Publishing.

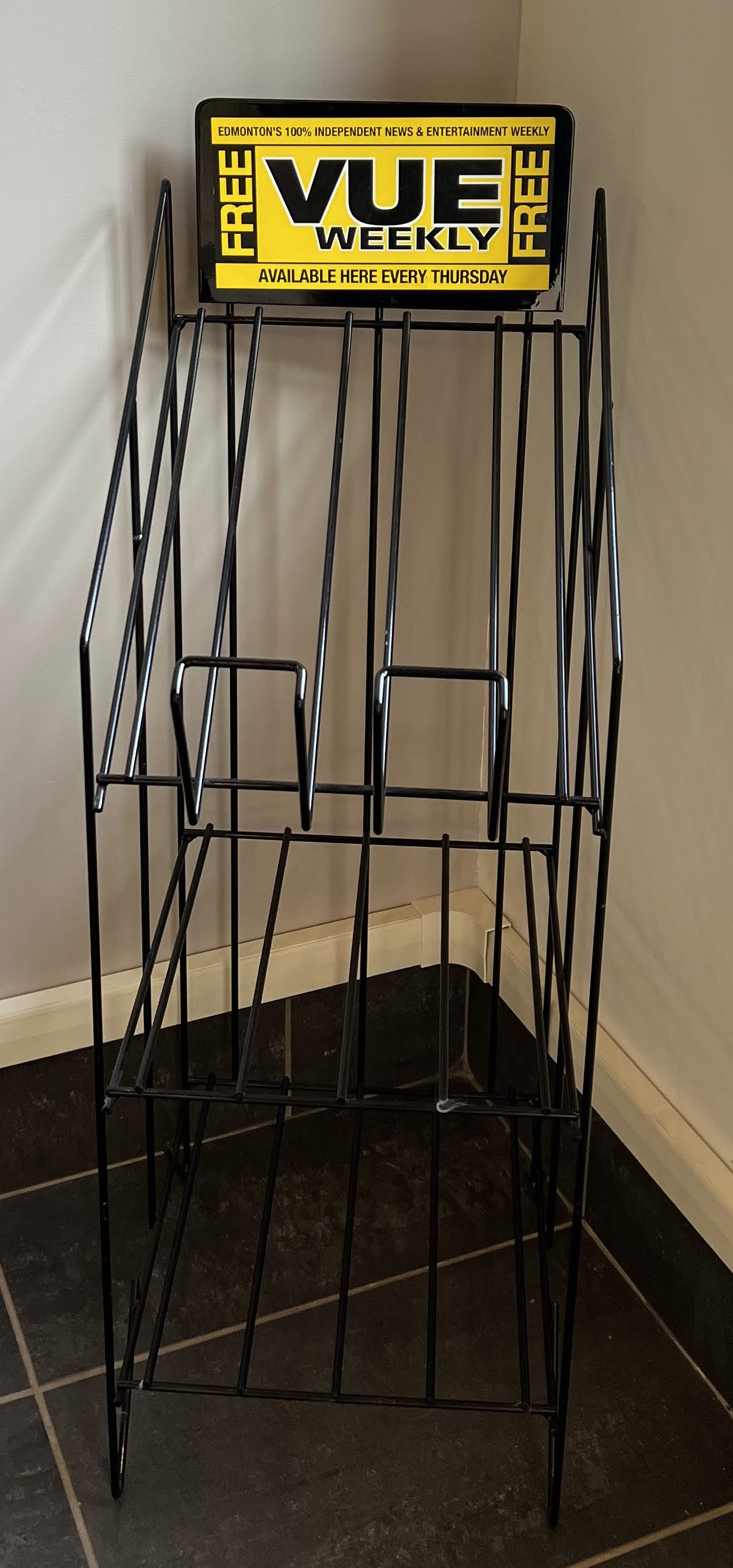

In 2011, Vue was purchased by Bob Doull and merged with See Magazine and consolidated under Postvue Publishing Inc. The new publication continued as Vue Weekly.

Vue Weekly ceased publishing at the end of November 2018, with Postvue Publishing stating that the demand for an alternative weekly in the Edmonton market had been declining for several years.

As of October 2019, the vueweekly.com website was no longer active but archived versions dating back to 2002 can be viewed on the Internet Archive Wayback Machine at https://web.archive.org/web/*/vueweekly.com.

Vue was a member of the Association of Alternative Newsweeklies.

== See also ==
- List of newspapers in Canada
