= Fast Forward Weekly =

Canadian weekly newspaper

- Type: Alternative weekly
- Owner: Great West Newspapers (Glacier Media)
- Publisher: Ian Chiclo
- Editor: Maureen McNamee
- Founded: December 1995; 30 years ago
- Ceased publication: March 2015; 11 years ago
- Language: English
- Headquarters: Calgary, Alberta, Canada
- Circulation: 30,000
- Website: ffwdweekly.com

Fast Forward Weekly (FFWD) was a news and entertainment weekly which provided news, alternative viewpoints, entertainment information, review articles and specialized advertising. It was distributed throughout Calgary, Banff and Canmore. It is owned by Great West Newspapers. With an assessed readership of 70,000 upon a distributed circulation of 30,000, the paper was one of the most widely circulated and well-respected alternative newspapers in Canada.

The paper originated in December 1995 as Calgary's first alternative weekly publication. As of 2007, it was the only freely-distributed weekly newspaper of its type in the city, having outlasted a number of competitors including a short-lived Calgary edition of The Georgia Straight, which had originally been called VOX, the long-running Calgary Mirror (which folded in 2001), and the Mirror's successor, FYI Calgary In-Print, which ran for only five months in 2001.

While the paper was initially arts-focused, in it later began covering more news stories and social issues.

In 2008, the paper was criticized over publishing a controversial article quoting Calgary Conservative MP Lee Richardson on comments regarding immigrants and crime which he later stated he regretted; clarifying he was referring only to youth gangs in the city. Canada's Prime Minister Stephen Harper called the reporting "gotcha journalism" for taking his comments out of their intended context, while other party leaders called for his resignation.

One of Fast Forward's most popular editions was its annual Best of Calgary readers' poll. For this, readers voluntarily submitted their responses to a large variety of questions, indicating their favourite (or least favourite) aspects of Calgary, including its food, people, culture, infrastructure, political leadership and more.

After 19 years, Fast Forward Weekly shut down. Great West Newspapers announced February 21, 2015, that the last issue would be March 5, 2015. "Ad revenue was not enough to support the continuance of a free weekly newspaper" was cited as the main reason for the publications demise.

The website, ffwdweekly.com, is offline but the snapshots of certain pages were saved 815 times between February 20, 2002, and January 5, 2022 and are viewable on the Internet Archive Wayback machine.

== See also ==
- List of newspapers in Canada
