= Pique Newsmagazine =

Newspaper in Whistler, British Columbia

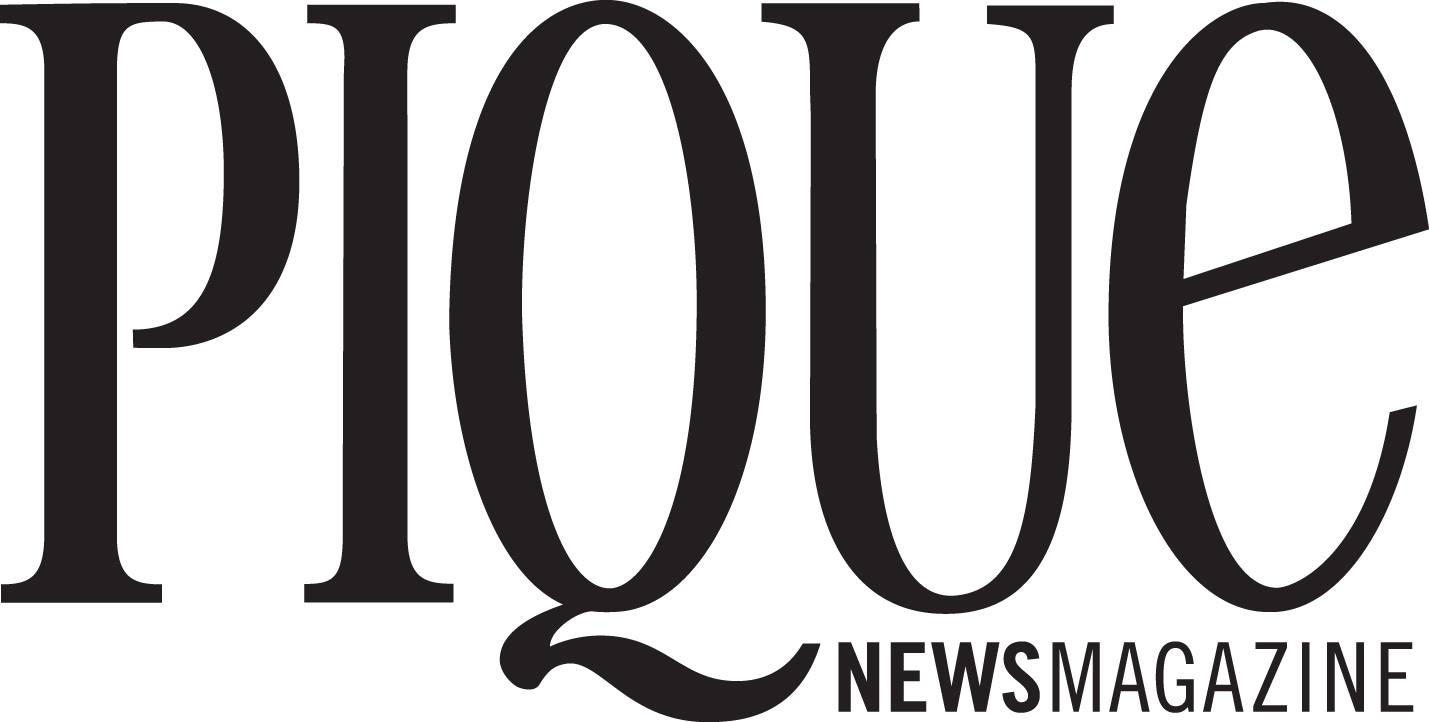
- Type: Weekly newspaper
- Format: Tabloid
- Publisher: Sarah Strother
- Editor: Braden Dupuis
- Founded: November 25, 1994
- Headquarters: 103-1390 Alpha Lake Road, Whistler, British Columbia, Canada
- Circulation: 16,140 in 2011
- Website: piquenewsmagazine.com

Pique Newsmagazine is the only newspaper serving the resort community of Whistler, British Columbia. It was founded in 1994 and operated as an independent, locally owned weekly newspaper until July 2013, when it was purchased by Glacier Media, who continues to own and operate the paper with locally produced content and editorial staff.

About 15,000 copies of the newsmagazine are distributed free each Thursday at over 200 distribution points from Vancouver to Mount Currie, including 130 distribution points in Whistler. It was started by Kathy Barnett, Bob Barnett, Kevin Damaskie and David Rigler.

Pique Newsmagazine also publishes the winter and summer FAQ - The Insiders Guide to Whistler, the winter and summer Whistler Magazine, Annual Crankd Bike Magazine and other publications.

== See also ==
- Squamish Chief
- Similkameen News Leader
- Canmore Leader
- Bow Valley Crag and Canyon
