= William Laxton =

William Laxton may refer to:

- William Laxton (surveyor) (1802–1854), British surveyor and author
- William Laxton (Lord Mayor of London) (1500s–1556), Lord Mayor of London during the reign of Henry VIII
- Bill Laxton (William Harry Laxton, born 1948), former Major League Baseball pitcher
