= Betty Slade =

Betty Slade may refer to:

- Betty Pariso (born 1956), née Slade, American bodybuilder
- Betty Slade (diver) (1921–2000), British diver
