= Coast Reporter =

Coast Reporter may refer to:

- Coast Reporter (British Columbia), a Canadian newspaper owned by Glacier Media, based in Sechelt, British Columbia
- Coast Reporter (California), a former American newspaper based in Whittier, California
