= Burnaby News Leader =

- Type: Weekly newspaper
- Owner(s): Glacier Media; Black Press
- Publisher: Jean Hincks
- Editor: Chris Bryan
- Founded: 1989
- Ceased publication: 2015
- Language: English
- Headquarters: Burnaby, British Columbia
- Website: Burnaby News Leader

Burnaby News Leader was a community newspaper in Burnaby, British Columbia founded in 1989. It closed operations in 2015.

== Background ==
In 2009, it was awarded Newspaper of the Year by Suburban Newspapers of America.

In 2015, Black Press sold the News Leader to Glacier Media. In September 2015, Glacier announced the closure of the News Leader, New Westminster News Leader, and Tri-Cities Now as of October 1.

== See also ==
- List of newspapers in Canada
- Burnaby Now
