= Laxton =

Laxton may refer to:

- Laxton, East Riding of Yorkshire
- Laxton, Northamptonshire
- Laxton, Nottinghamshire

Persons with the surname Laxton:

- Laxton (surname)
