= Jack Roberts (footballer, born 1867) =

Australian rules footballer

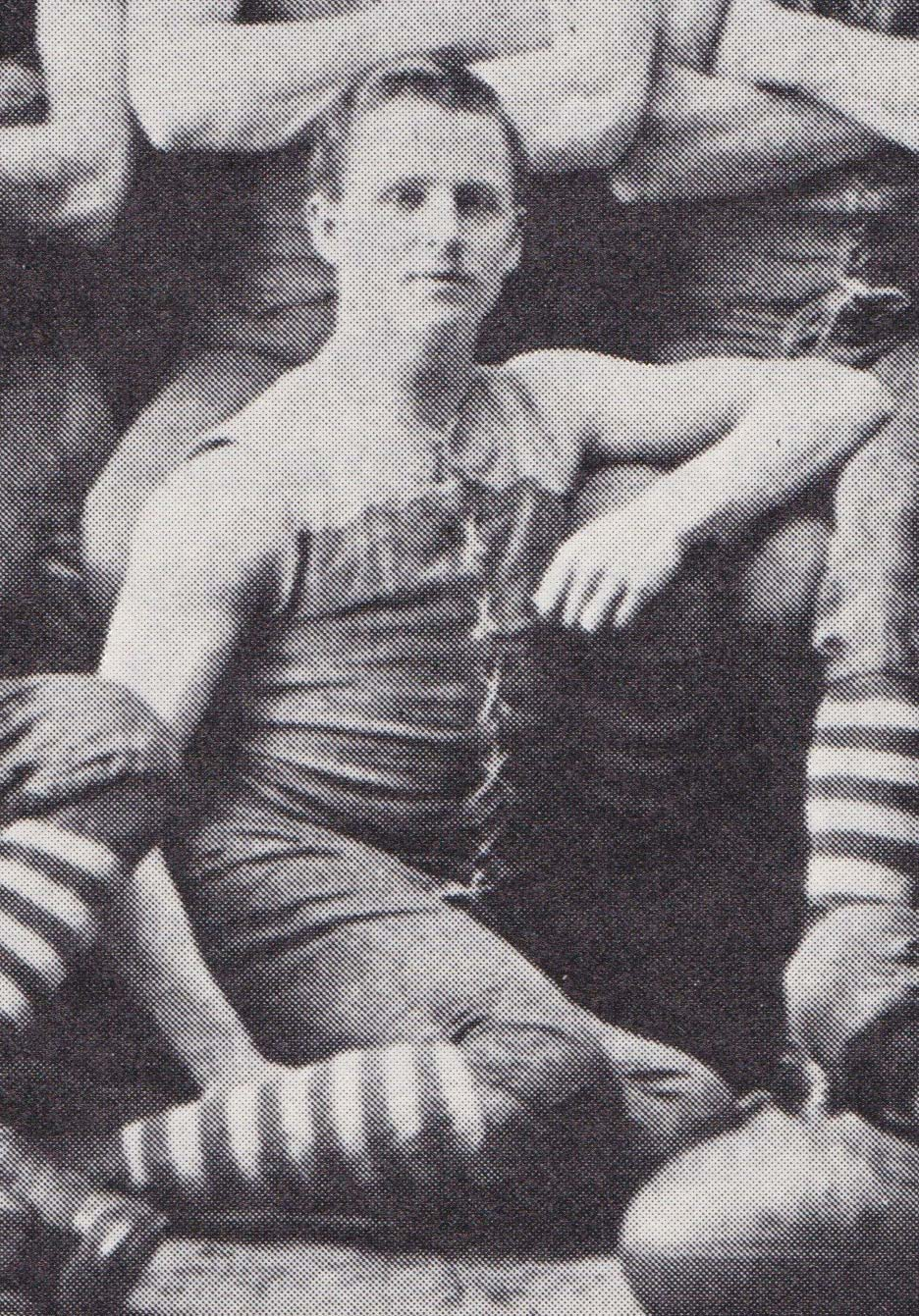
- Roberts during his Carlton career

Personal information
- Full name: John Alexander Roberts
- Born: 2 January 1867; Scarsdale, Victoria
- Died: 5 August 1921 (aged 54); Abbotsford, Victoria
- Positions: Wingman, defender

Playing career^{1}
Years	Club	Games (Goals)
1889–96	Carlton (VFA)	108 (17)
1897–99	Carlton	24 (2)
- ^{1} Playing statistics correct to the end of 1899.

John Alexander Roberts (2 January 1867 – 5 August 1921) was an Australian rules footballer who played with Carlton in the Victorian Football League (VFL).

== Family ==
The son of William Roberts (1835-1924), and Jenefer Roberts (-1903), née Trahair, John Alexander Roberts was born at Scarsdale, near Ballarat, Victoria on 2 January 1867.

He married Annie Beatrice Knoll (1873-1956) in 1893. They had four children, Lillian Beatrice Laxton, née Roberts (1894-1980), Archibald John Roberts (1897-1967), Vivian Ernest Roberts (1902-1968), and Dorothy Emily Power, née Roberts (1899-). He was the father-in-law of Charlie Laxton, who married Lily in 1917.

== Death ==
He died on 5 August 1921. He had "caught a chill" when attending the match between Collingwood and Essendon at Victoria Park on 30 July 1921. The "chill" developed into the double pneumonia from which he died.

An "In Memoriam" service was held at St Philips Church of England, in Collingwood, on 21 August 1921.
