= Media in Alberta =

Media in Alberta includes published, broadcast, and digital media originating in the Canadian province of Alberta.

== Print media ==
=== Daily newspapers ===
In 2010, daily paid circulation for the largest Alberta-based newspapers were:

- Calgary Herald (Postmedia) – 914,165
- Edmonton Journal (Postmedia) – 756,148
- Edmonton Sun (Postmedia) – 323,410
- Calgary Sun (Postmedia) – 279,724
- Lethbridge Herald (Glacier/Alta) – 112,622
- Red Deer Advocate (Black Press) – 83,987
- Medicine Hat News (Glacier/Alta) – 70,452
- Grande Prairie Daily Herald-Tribune (Postmedia) – 28,155
- Fort McMurray Today (Postmedia) – 10,305

== Concentration and political leanings ==
=== Concentration of ownership ===
The Foundation for Democratic Advancement did an overview of media ownership in the course of a paper on media coverage of elections in 2012; this found that the majority of the daily newspaper market in Alberta in controlled by two companies Postmedia (64.8%) and Quebecor/Sun Media (24.9%). A different measure of media concentration was used for broadcasting in the same study, that of ownership of stations (including stations with no news content), rather than by ratings. The largest radio company was Newcap Broadcasting which owned 32 of 92 total stations, Rogers Media owned 14, and James A. Pattison owned nine. In television, the largest companies were Bell Media with four stations, Rogers with four, Shaw Media with three, and the CBC with three (two English-language, one French).

=== Political bias ===
In 1937, the Social Credit government of William Aberhart passed the Accurate News and Information Act which forced newspapers to print "corrections" to stories the government objected to, and would require the papers to reveal their sources in the case of statements against the government. This bill became part of a constitutional crisis between the lieutenant governor and the federal government on one side, and the Social Credit government (especially its radical wing represented by the Social Credit Board) on the other. This led to the Reference re Alberta Statutes case in the Supreme Court which ruled the act to be ultra vires (unconstitutional). As well the Edmonton Journal won a special Pulitzer Prize for Press Freedom for fighting against the law, the only non-American newspaper ever to have done so.

The Foundation for Democratic Advancement’s study stated that the media coverage of the political parties in the 2012 election was biased, in their opinion, in that it focused overwhelmingly on the two supposed front-runner parties, the Progressive Conservatives and the Wildrose Party, as these parties received 62% of media coverage although seven other political parties fielded candidates, including two (the Alberta Liberals and the Alberta New Democrats) that fielded candidates in every constituency. The two front-running parties went on to capture 77.3% of the popular vote.

== See also ==
By medium

- List of newspapers in Alberta
- List of radio stations in Alberta
- List of television stations in Alberta

By city

- Media in Banff, Alberta
- Media in Calgary
- Media in Edmonton
- Media in Fort McMurray
- Media in Grande Prairie
- Media in Lethbridge
- Media in Medicine Hat
- Media in Red Deer, Alberta
