= Prince George Citizen =

Canadian newspaper in British Columbia

- Type: Weekly newspaper
- Format: Tabloid
- Owner(s): Cameron Stolz; Terresa Randall-Stolz
- Publisher: Cameron Stolz
- Managing editor: Kennedy Gordon
- Founded: 1916
- Language: English
- Headquarters: #505 4th Avenue; Prince George, British Columbia; V2L 3H2
- Circulation: The Prince George Citizen publishes 23,000 newspapers which are distributed free through a pull box system available at 400 locations around Prince George.
- ISSN: 0832-4247
- Website: PrinceGeorgeCitizen.com

The Prince George Citizen is a weekly newspaper located in Prince George, British Columbia, Canada. It is owned by Cameron Stolz, a former city counciller, and his wife Terresa Randall-Stolz.

In addition to Prince George, the Citizen also covers the outlying communities of Fort St. James, Fraser Lake, Mackenzie, McBride, Quesnel, and Vanderhoof, British Columbia.

The Citizen was established in 1916 as a weekly newspaper and converted to daily publication in 1957.

Issues from 1916–present (with a 12-month embargo) are now available online in the Prince George Newspapers database, an ongoing collaborative library project.

Along with several other small British Columbia dailies, the Prince George Citizen was one of the last Canadian properties to be held by Hollinger Inc., the media conglomerate owned by Conrad Black. Hollinger sold its remaining Canadian holdings to Vancouver-based Glacier Ventures International, later called Glacier Media, in 2006.

In 2024, former Prince George City Councillor Cameron Stolz acquired the newspaper from Glacier Media to prevent its shutdown after it incurred a loss of $56,000 in 2023.

== Prince George Newspapers ==
The Prince George Newspapers database is a partnering initiative with key information service providers in Northern British Columbia, Canada. In this collaborative venture, three libraries – the Prince George Public Library, the College of New Caledonia Library, and the Geoffrey R. Weller Library at the University of Northern British Columbia – are working together to provide free online access to the historical newspapers of the city of Prince George, British Columbia. As BC's “northern capital,” Prince George has played a vital role in developing the province's northern region. The newspapers, which began to be published before the city's incorporation in 1915, are an important source of information on the region's growth and continuing development. This project is being undertaken with the consent and support of the Prince George Citizen. Financial assistance has also been provided by the BC History Digitization Program of the Irving K. Barber Learning Centre at the University of British Columbia, the Prince George Community Foundation, the Friends of the Prince George Public Library, and BC 150.

=== Newspapers ===
Over 100 years of full-text newspapers are available for searching, and more content is being added each year. The database currently includes the following newspapers:

- Fort George Tribune: 1909 – 1915
- Fort George Herald: 1910 – 1915
- Prince George Herald: 1915 – 1916
- Prince George Post: 1914 – 1915
- Prince George Star: 1916 – 1917
- Prince George Leader: 1921 – 1923
- Prince George Citizen: 1916 – present (with 12 month embargo)
- College of New Caledonia Student Newspapers: 1970 – onward

== See also ==
- List of newspapers in Canada
