= St. Albert Gazette =

Newspaper published in St. Albert, Alberta, Canada

- Type: Weekly newspaper
- Format: Tabloid
- Owner: Great West Newspapers
- Founder: Wim Netelenbos Sr
- Publisher: Tim Shoults
- Editor: Jen Henderson
- Founded: 1961; 64 years ago
- Language: English
- Headquarters: St. Albert, Alberta
- Circulation: 21,273
- Website: www.stalbertgazette.com

The St. Albert Gazette is a weekly newspaper distributed throughout St. Albert, Alberta and published every Thursday.

The newspaper was founded on June 17, 1961 by Wim Netelenbos Sr. who originally operated the paper out of his home. It was usually 28 black-and-white pages and the first writers were originally volunteers with the paper published every Saturday.

In 1980, the Gazette bought a used printing press, which allowed the paper to do its own printing. They also formed a new printing operation at the same time.

In 1980, the paper was owned by Southam Inc., which at the time owned newspapers across Canada, including the nearby Edmonton Journal. In 1995, the Gazette and Southam Inc. formed Great West Newspapers which began acquiring community newspapers throughout the province. In 1997, Southam Inc. was bought out by Hollinger Inc. In 2005, the Gazette bought out Hollinger and entered a partnership with Vancouver-based Glacier Media. Today, Great West Newspapers and the Gazette are owned by Glacier Media and Jamison Newspapers Inc.

== Earlier newspaper ==
In 1949, a different newspaper also named the St. Albert Gazette began publication. It was published out of nearby Edmonton and reported news from around Sturgeon County. The newspaper stopped publication in 1953, when it merged with the Morinville Journal.
