= Tri-City News =

- Type: Online newspaper
- Format: Tabloid (until 2023)
- Owner: Glacier Media
- Publisher: Lara Graham
- Founded: 1985
- Ceased publication: April 21, 2025
- Language: English
- Headquarters: Port Coquitlam, British Columbia
- Circulation: 52,962
- Website: www.tricitynews.com

The Tri-City News was a Canadian online community based in Port Coquitlam and published by Glacier Media, and serving the Tri-Cities region of British Columbia's Lower Mainland. It was established in 1985 as a weekly printed newspaper.

In the 2008 Better Newspapers Competition from the Canadian Community Newspapers Association, the Tri-City News took second place in "Best All-Round Newspaper" for large circulation newspapers, and won the "Best Front Page" category.

In 2015, Black Press sold the News to Glacier Media. The printed edition ceased publication August 10, 2023, thereby discontinuing the jobs of all current newspaper deliverers. In February 2025, Glacier Media announced Tri-City News would close no later than April 21.

== See also ==
- List of newspapers in Canada
