= Canmore Leader =

Weekly newspaper in Alberta, Canada

- Type: Weekly newspaper
- Format: Tabloid
- Owner: Sun Media
- Publisher: Shawn Cornell
- Editor: Russ Ullyot
- Founded: 1983
- Headquarters: Canmore, Alberta
- Circulation: 7,169
- Website: www.canmoreleader.com

The Canmore Leader was a weekly newspaper based in Canmore, Alberta, Canada. Its final issue was published on June 26, 2013. The final editor was Russ Ullyot and the final publisher was Shawn Cornell. The paper was closed and staff were amalgamated with staff from the Banff Crag & Canyon newspaper to create a regional paper, the Bow Valley Crag & Canyon.

== See also ==
- Pique Newsmagazine
- Similkameen News Leader
- Banff Crag & Canyon
