= William Luxton =

Canadian politician

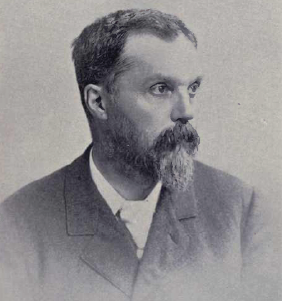

Member of the Legislative Assembly of Manitoba for Rockwood
- In office 1874–1878

Personal details
- Born: William Fisher Luxton; 12 December 1844 Bampton, Devon, England
- Died: 20 May 1907 (aged 62) Winnipeg, Manitoba, Canada
- Spouse: Sarah Jane Edwards (married 1866, died 1927)
- Children: 8 including Norman Luxton

William Fisher Luxton (12 December 1844 – 20 May 1907) was a Canadian teacher, newspaper editor and publisher, politician, and office holder. He is most well known for founding the Manitoba Free Press.

== Life ==
Born in Bampton, Devon, England, his mother was Jane Palmer Luxton (1819–1859), daughter of Thomas Luxton (1773-1840) and Jenny Palmer (1791–1860), of Hutchings Farm, Bampton, Petton, Devonshire. William was baptized on December 26, 1843 at St. John the Baptist Church, Skilgate, Somerset, where his mother was visiting with other members of the Luxton family for the Christmas holiday. In the 1851 English census William, age 7, was recorded residing at "Hutchings" with his uncle Thomas Luxton (1825–1849) and his grandmother Jenny.

Luxton migrated to British North America in about 1855, and moved to Winnipeg, Manitoba, Canada in 1871. In 1871, he moved to Winnipeg to teach in the first school established under the provisions of the Manitoba Schools Act of 1871. In 1866, he married Sarah Jane Edwards of Lobo Township, Canada West, and had six sons and two daughters. One of his sons, Norman Luxton, was later known as "Mr. Banff" and founded the Crag and Canyon newspaper.

In November 1872, he along with John A. Kenny, a retired farmer from Ontario, Luxton started a pro-Liberal weekly newspaper, the Manitoba Free Press. The paper grew with the incorporation of the city of Winnipeg in 1874. It became a daily newspapers with over 1,000 subscribers. Employment jumped from five to 60 people and construction began on a two-story building.

Luxton became a leading citizen of Winnipeg and in 1872 he helped establish the Winnipeg General Hospital (later the Winnipeg Health Sciences Centre). He ran and lost for mayor in 1874 (the first civic election in Winnipeg) but went to serve as a school trustee, a Member of the Legislative Assembly for the Rockwood area from 1874–1878, and sat again in the Legislative Assembly for South Winnipeg from 1886-1888. He also served on the council of the Winnipeg Board of Trade.

Luxton was a founder of the Winnipeg Humane Society. He served as chairman of the Winnipeg School Board from 1885-87.

As a politician, Luxton's main goals in 1876 were prohibition, the establishment of a secular school system and the abolition of French as an official language in Manitoba. He was strongly opposed to the Canadian Pacific Railway (CPR) and was critic of the Conservative government of Manitoba.

Luxton made enemies of both Liberals and Conservatives over the years. It led to him being deposed as owner and editor of the Free Press in 1893 when he missed the repayment deadline of a loan he had taken in 1888 from Sir Donald Alexander Smith. Luxton started another newspaper shortly after being replaced at the Free Press. He started the Daily Nor'Wester which he sold in 1896. He finished his journalistic career working for the St. Paul Globe in Minnesota. Another son, George, joined his father at the Globe as a photographer, and went on to be a prominent garden columnist in the local media with a park named after him.

In 1901, Luxton returned to Winnipeg and served as inspector of public buildings for the Government of Manitoba until his death. His funeral procession was one of the longest in Winnipeg's history, with the Typographical Union providing a guard of honour.

In the fall of 1907, in recognition of one of the city's earliest teachers, Luxton School which backs on to the street that also bears his name in Winnipeg's North End was named after him.
