= Luxon =

Luxon may refer to:

- An obsolete synonym for the troland, a unit of conventional retinal illuminance

== People with the surname ==
- Benjamin Luxon (1937–2024), British baritone
- Christopher Luxon (born 1970), 42nd Prime Minister of New Zealand
