= Media in Banff, Alberta =

This is a list of media in Banff, Alberta.

== Radio ==
Call sign	Frequency	Owner	Format	Notes
CKRY-FM-2	93.3 FM	Corus Entertainment	country	Rebroadcaster of CKRY-FM Calgary
CJAQ-FM-1	94.1 FM	Rogers Radio	adult hits	Rebroadcaster of CJAQ-FM Calgary
CJAY-FM-1	95.1 FM	Bell Media	active rock	Rebroadcaster of CJAY-FM Calgary
CBRB-FM	96.3 FM	CBC Radio One	public news/talk (English)	Rebroadcaster of CBR (AM) Calgary
CHFM-FM-1	99.3 FM	Rogers Radio	adult contemporary	Rebroadcaster of CHFM-FM Calgary
CFGQ-FM-2	100.1 FM	Corus Entertainment	classic alternative	Rebroadcaster of CFGQ-FM Calgary
CFPE-FM	101.1 FM	Banff Centre for Arts and Creativity	tourist/park information (English)	
CFPF-FM	103.3 FM	Banff Centre for Arts and Creativity	tourist/park information (French)	
CKUA-FM-14	104.3 FM	CKUA Radio Foundation	public broadcasting	Rebroadcaster of CKUA Edmonton
CHFA-12-FM	105.7 FM	Ici Radio-Canada Première	public news/talk (French)	Rebroadcaster of CHFA-FM Edmonton
CHMN-FM-1	106.5 FM	Rogers Radio	adult contemporary	Rebroadcaster of CHMN-FM Canmore
CJXB-FM	107.9 FM	Banff Centre for Arts and Creativity	adult album alternative/Banff Centre artists	

CFPE-FM, CFPF-FM, and CJXB-FM are Banff's only local radio stations. The rest of the stations are rebroadcasters from Calgary, one out of Canmore, and another two out of Edmonton. All serve the population of Banff.

Although all other radio stations originating from Calgary do not rebroadcast their signals into Banff, they can be heard in Banff as well, depending on elevation. For example, CBR-FM, a CBC Music affiliate that broadcasts at 102.1 FM and CIBK-FM 98.5 FM. Some of Red Deer's originating FM signals, like CIZZ-FM, can also be heard in Banff.

To see a complete list of media in Calgary go to: Media in Calgary.

== Television ==
All terrestrial television stations in the Banff area are repeaters of stations and networks that originate from Calgary.

The region is not designated as, nor part of, a mandatory market for digital television conversion. Only CICT-TV announced its intention to convert its transmitters to digital.

Analog channel	Digital channel	Callsign	Network	Notes
7		CFCN-TV-2	CTV	Repeater of CFCN-DT Calgary
13		CICT-TV-2	Global	Repeater of CICT-DT Calgary

== Print ==
- Bow Valley Crag and Canyon - Banff's community newspaper, now digital only.
- Rocky Mountain Outlook - Bow Valley's weekly community newspaper.
