= Lexton =

Lexton may refer to:

- Lexton Moy (born 1985), footballer
- Lexton, Victoria, town
- Shire of Lexton, former municipality
