= Harry Laxton =

Australian rules footballer

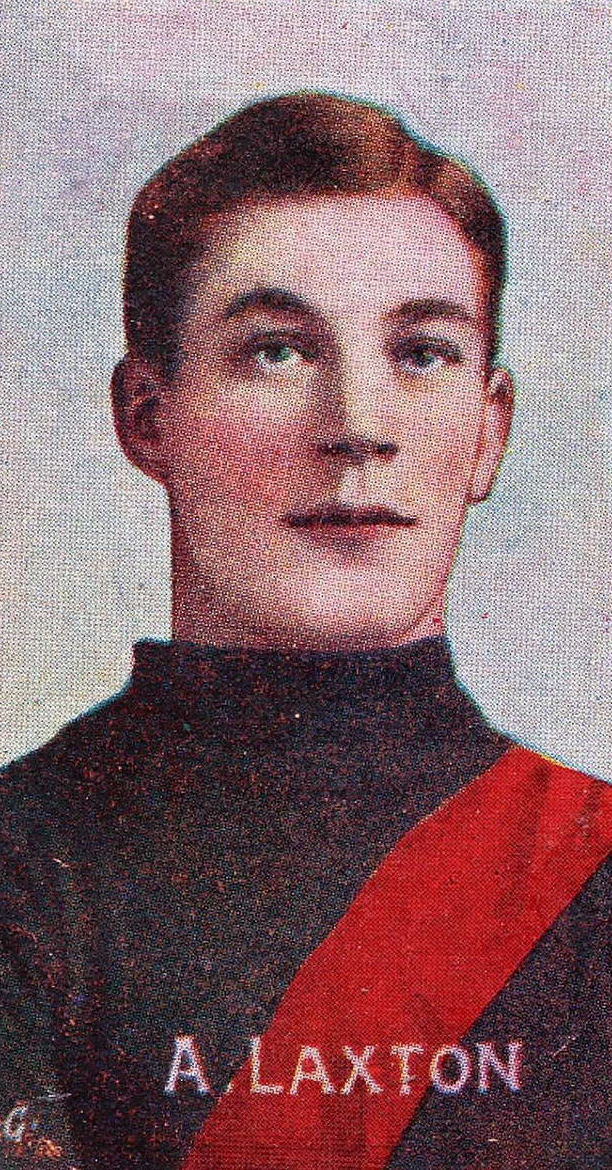
- Cigaretter card of Laxton in 1908

Personal information
- Full name: Herbert Jackson Laxton
- Born: 22 August 1879; Aldgate, South Australia
- Died: 16 January 1947 (aged 67); Parkville, Victoria
- Original team: West Melbourne

Playing career^{1}
Years	Club	Games (Goals)
1904–07	Essendon	44 (3)
- ^{1} Playing statistics correct to the end of 1907.

Herbert Jackson 'Harry' Laxton (22 August 1879 – 16 January 1947) was an Australian rules footballer who played with Essendon in the Victorian Football League (VFL).

His younger brother, Charlie Laxton, played for Collingwood.
