= Charles Luxton =

English clergyman and cricketer

Charles Henry Luxton (19 January 1861 – 17 October 1918) was an English clergyman and a cricketer who played in two first-class cricket matches for Cambridge University in 1881 and 1882. He was born at Bondleigh, Devon and died at St Pancras, London.

Luxton was educated at Devon County School, West Buckland and at Peterhouse, Cambridge. In his two first-class cricket games, he was a tail-end batsman and a bowler, and neither his batting nor his bowling style are known; he made little impression in either game. In minor cricket, he played for Devon and other amateur sides through to the mid-1880s.

Luxton graduated from Cambridge University in 1883 and was ordained as a priest in the Church of England. He was curate at Lifton, Devon and Milverton in Somerset before becoming the vicar of Langford Budville, Somerset in 1894, where he remained until his death.
