= Steve Luxton =

Canadian-based poet

- Born: 1946 (age 79–80); Coventry, England
- Occupations: Poet and educator

Steve Luxton (born in Coventry, England, in 1946) is a Canadian-based poet living near Ayer's Cliff, Quebec in the Eastern Townships. He taught at English Literature at John Abbott College and Creative Writing at Concordia University. He was an original editor of Matrix and The Moosehead Review and co-owner and editor of the Montreal publishing company started by Louis Dudek, DC Books, from 1987 to 2012. He left to focus on producing his own work. He was also a founding member of the now defunct Montreal Storytellers, an oral storytelling group which performed in both Canada and the U.S.

He participated in Dial-A-Poem Montreal 1985–1987.

== Publications ==
=== Poetry ===
- The Dying Meteorologist. Montreal, QC: DC Books, 2019.
- Iridium. Montreal, QC: DC Books, 2013.
- In the Vision of Birds: New and Selected Poems. Montreal, QC: DC Books, 2012.
- Luna Moth and Other Poems. Montreal, QC: DC Books, 2004.
- The Hills that Pass By. Montreal, QC: DC Books, 1987.
