= Norman Luxton =

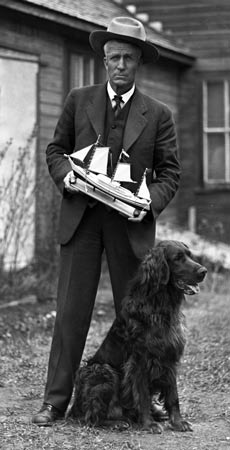
- Norman Luxton holding a model of the Tilikum, 1923
- Born: Norman Kenny Luxton; November 2, 1876; Fort Garry, Manitoba
- Died: October 26, 1962 (aged 85); Calgary, Alberta
- Other names: Mr. Banff
- Known for: Tilikum
- Children: Eleanor Georgina Luxton (1908-1995)
- Parent: William Luxton

Norman Kenny Luxton (November 2, 1876 – October 26, 1962) was a pioneer in the Canadian Rockies known as "Mr. Banff". With John Voss, he attempted to sail around the world in an old red cedar Indian dug-out canoe. On his return to Canada, he worked on improving the community of Banff, Alberta and the relationship between its residents and the aboriginal community.

== Personal life ==
Norman Luxton was the son of Winnipeg Free Press co-founder, William Luxton in Fort Garry, Manitoba (now Winnipeg). He first worked with his father at the Free Press in Manitoba. In 1892 he worked for the Indian Agency at Rat Portage (now, Kenora, Ontario). In 1893, Norman decided to head to the Cariboo Gold Fields to make his fortune. It is hard to know if he did make it to the gold fields, but he did make it to Calgary and worked for the Calgary Herald for the next eight years before moving to Vancouver in 1901. In 1904, Norman Luxton married Georgina (Georgie) Elizabeth McDougall (1870-1965) of the pioneer missionary McDougall family of Morley, Alberta. Norman and Georgie Luxton had one child, Eleanor Georgina, born in Banff in 1908. Norman F. Luxton died on October 22, 1962, at the age of 89, in the Holy Cross Hospital in Calgary.

== Pacific crossing ==
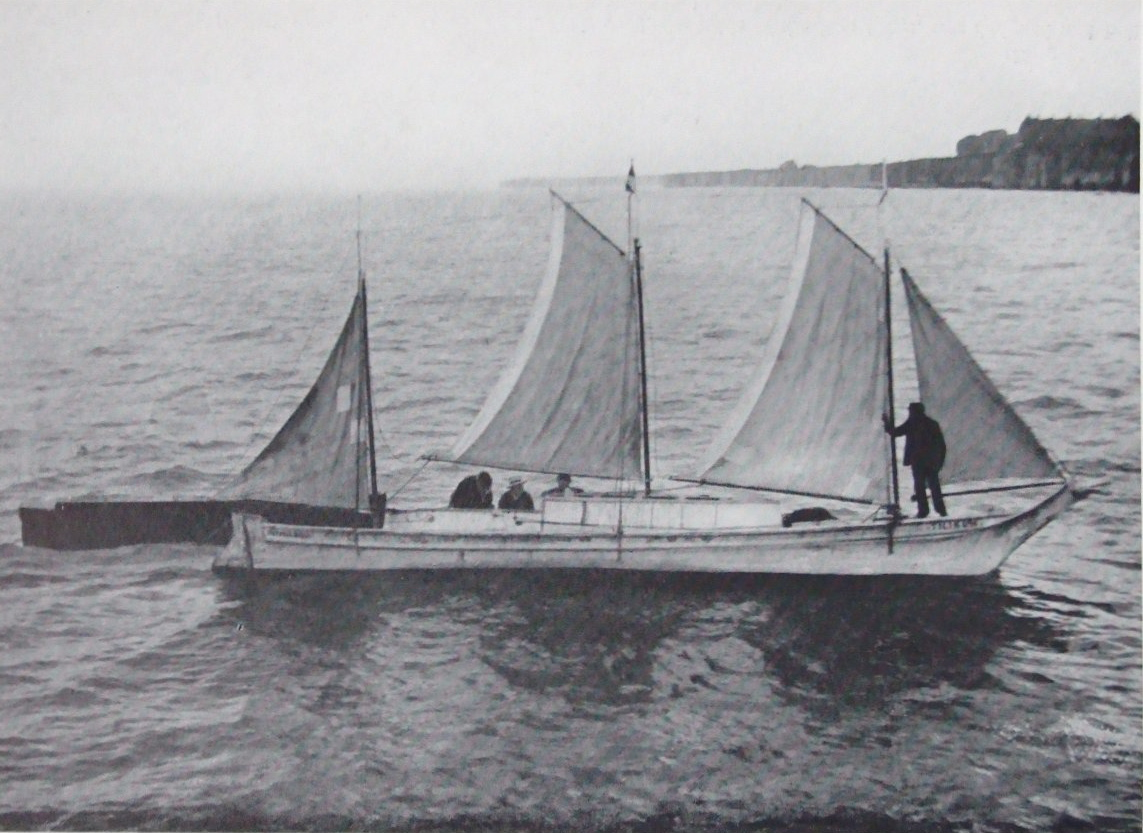
The Tilikum at Margate with Captain John Voss standing at the bows.

In 1901, Norman moved west to Vancouver where he briefly worked for a weekly called Town Topics. While in Victoria, Norman met Captain John Voss, an eccentric sea captain. The two planned an adventurous voyage. They would purchase a 100-year-old Nootka dugout canoe and sail it around the world, leaving from Victoria, British Columbia and heading west to London. The dugout canoe was named the Tilikum, meaning friend in Chinook Jargon. Luxton journeyed 10,000 miles (about 16,000 km) on the Pacific Ocean with Voss, and endured five months of travel, before the Tilikum struck a reef and Luxton was thrown from the boat. His whole body was badly cut by coral, and he had to abandon the trip in Fiji, and was immediately taken to a hospital in Australia. Following this, Luxton came to Banff to recuperate. He kept notes of the voyage; his Tilikum Journal, edited by his daughter Eleanor was published in 1971. Captain John Voss finished his journey around the world and published his sailing memoir as The Venturesome Voyages of Captain Voss in 1913. The Tilikum boat changed hands a number of times but is now on display under cover in the cruise ships terminal in Victoria, British Columbia.

A map of the voyage of the Tilikum. Luxton made it as far as Suva, Fiji before having to stop from his injuries.

== Life in Banff ==
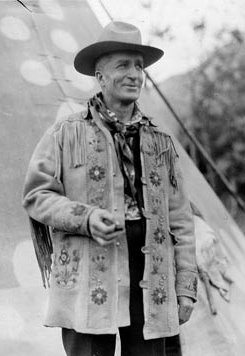
Norman Luxton at the Banff Indian Days festival, 1927

Luxton became prominent in Banff after his return from his sailing trip across the Pacific. He published the Crag and Canyon newspaper, built the King Edward Hotel and the Lux Theatre in Banff, and founded the Sign of the Goat Curio Shop, which led to the development of the Luxton Museum of Plains Indians, now the Buffalo Nations Museum. He was one of the organizers of Banff Indian Days and the Banff Winter Carnival. Norman was also made an honorary chief of the Stoney tribe and given the name Chief White Shield.

In 1953, Luxton established a museum to house his native artifacts. The Luxton Museum of the Plains Indian which is known as the Buffalo Nations Luxton Museum was built in co-operation with Eric Harvie of the Glenbow Foundation of Calgary. On the death of his only daughter Eleanor Luxton in 1995, ownership of the home, built c. 1905 in Banff, passed to the Eleanor Luxton Historical Foundation.

The objective of the Eleanor Luxton Historical Foundation is to foster public awareness of the history of Banff and its environs during the century that the Luxton were influential in the community with emphasis on the careers of Norman K. Luxton, Georgina McDougall Luxton, and Eleanor G. Luxton. The historic Luxton home built c. 1905 in Banff has been preserved, restored and is open to the public through Whyte Museum guided tours. The interior of the home has been preserved and represents the lives of the three family members and the evolution of a Banff lifestyle over a period of nine decades. Of special interest are the collections of Stoney artifacts, evening gowns dating back to the turn of the century, household collectibles, and taxidermy specimens.

The importance of gardening to the family is evident in the extensive collection of garden-related artifacts preserved in the home. These include tools, catalogues, and seed packets dating back to 1913. The garden is open to public and it is supposed to be one of the first flower gardens in Banff, still blooming every year.
