= Burnaby Now =

Weekly newspaper in Canada

- Type: Weekly newspaper
- Owner: Glacier Media
- Publisher: Lara Graham
- Editor: Mark Falkenberg
- Founded: November 23, 1983; 42 years ago
- Ceased publication: 2025-04-21
- Language: English
- Headquarters: Burnaby, British Columbia, Canada
- Circulation: 44,158 (as of 2022)
- Website: www.burnabynow.com

Burnaby Now was an online newspaper owned by Glacier Media and based in Burnaby, British Columbia, Canada. Until 2023, it published a weekly tabloid newspaper to 47,000 residents and businesses.

In February 2025, Glacier Media announced Burnaby Now would close no later than April 21. However, archived articles are still accessible in the Lodestar Media (formerly Glacier Media) on their "Vancouver is Awesome" brand website.

The first edition was a 12-page broadsheet format issued on November 23, 1983, which was a week after the final publication of 123-year-old The Columbian newspaper. The final print edition was produced on August 10, 2023, as part of cuts to three Glacier Media publications.

== See also ==
- List of newspapers in Canada
