= Betty Slade (diver) =

British diver (1921–2000)

Personal information
- Full name: Elizabeth Joyce Slade
- Nationality: British
- Born: 18 June 1921 Leicester, England
- Died: 3 November 2000 (aged 79) Chesapeake, Virginia, United States
- Height: 4 ft 11 in (1.50 m)

Sport
- Sport: Diving
- Coached by: Cyril Laxton, c.1930s Johnie Johnson, c.1940s
Medal record
Event / 1st / 2nd / 3rd; European Aquatics Championships / 1 / - / -
Women's swimming
Representing Great Britain
European Aquatics Championships
Gold medal – first place	1938 London	3 m springboard

Elizabeth Joyce Slade (18 June 1921 – 3 November 2000) was a British diver. She competed in the women's 3 metre springboard event at the 1936 Summer Olympics and won a gold medal in the 3m women's springboard event at the 1938 European Aquatics Championships.

Slade was described as being "extremely powerfully built" and trained as a ballet dancer prior to her career in diving. During her diving career, she was known to have been coached by Cyril Laxton and Johnie Johnson.

== Biography ==
Slade was born in Leicester. In 1936, at the age of 14, Slade entered the British National Championship, winning at the first attempt and beating Katinka Larsen, who had finished second in the 1934 European championship. Slade was described in September 1937 as the "spring-board diving champion of England", a title she had held for two years by that point, while gaining additional honours at the Empire Pool in Wembley that month. She remained unbeaten and went on to win the high-board championship in 1939. In April 1938, she was admitted to hospital with a serious ear infection while participating in a diving competition in Holland, prompting doctors to warn that bathing caps or helmets alone would not offer sufficient protection.

She won a gold medal in the springboard diving event at the 1938 European Aquatics Championships and was the only British aquatics athlete to do so, where the winners were dominated by Germany who had hosted the Olympics dominated two years prior. She was the smallest competitor in the field. Following the European championship win, she was described as England and Europe's "No. 1 springboard diver" and in August 1938, gave a display at the Hilsea Swimming Pool to around 2,000 spectators. She was reported in 1939 to be getting coached by Cyril Laxton, who was also credited with discovering her.

Slade turned professional in 1945, which in turn prevented her from winning an Olympic title, as world diving experts of the time believed that she would almost certainly have won the highboard title if being allowed to compete. Her repertoire of dives was estimated in the region of 50, described as an "amazing" number and may have taken well over an hour to demonstrate all of them. By 1949, Slade was being described as a "famous British Professional Diver".

== Personal ==
Slade was described as being "extremely powerfully built" and was described as being 4 feet 6 inches (1.37 m) tall in 1938 and 4 feet 11 inches (1.50 m) around 1949. She was a trained ballet dancer which had originally been her chosen career, while gaining the highest honours. Her ballet career was cut short due to her diving.
