= Buffalo Nations Luxton Museum =

Coordinates: 51.1721°N 115.5734°W

- Exterior entrance of the museum
- Established: 1953
- Location: 1 Birch Ave, Banff, Alberta, Canada
- Type: History museum
- Website: https://www.buffalonationsmuseum.com/home

The Buffalo Nations Luxton Museum (also known as the Buffalo Nations Museum) is an Indigenous history and cultural museum located in the town of Banff, Alberta. The museum contains artifacts, artwork, and historical information from the Blackfoot Confederacy (consisting of the Siksika, Piikani and Kainai Nations), the Īyãhé Nakoda Nations, and the Tsuut’ina Nation. The museum is "dedicated to the appreciation, interpretation, demonstration and display of the cultures, traditions, and values of the First Nations of North America and their trading partners".

== History ==
The museum was founded by Norman Luxton, in collaboration with Eric Harvie of the Glenbow Museum in Calgary, Alberta. Construction for the museum began in 1950, with the museum opening to the public in June of 1953. The museum was originally known as the Luxton Museum of the Plains Indians, and was built to house Luxton's personal collection of native artifacts.

After the death of Normal Luxton in 1962, the museum's ownership was transferred to the Glenbow-Alberta Institute. It was eventually sold in 1992 to its current owners, the Buffalo Nations Cultural Society.

== Exhibits ==
The museum highlights the Northern Plains and Rocky Mountain cultures. Its collection includes artifacts and dioramas that depict daily life (garments and hunting equipment) as well as ceremonial life. The exhibition, Tuktu Prayers, included 45 works of art depicting caribou herds.

== Programming ==
The museum offers interpretive tours by local Elders, smudge ceremonies, dancing and drumming classes, art classes, feather painting, beading workshops, and other workshop opportunities. The museum closed temporarily due to COVID-19 pandemic regulations in 2020, but in January 2021 they offered a Siksika interpretive hayride tour.

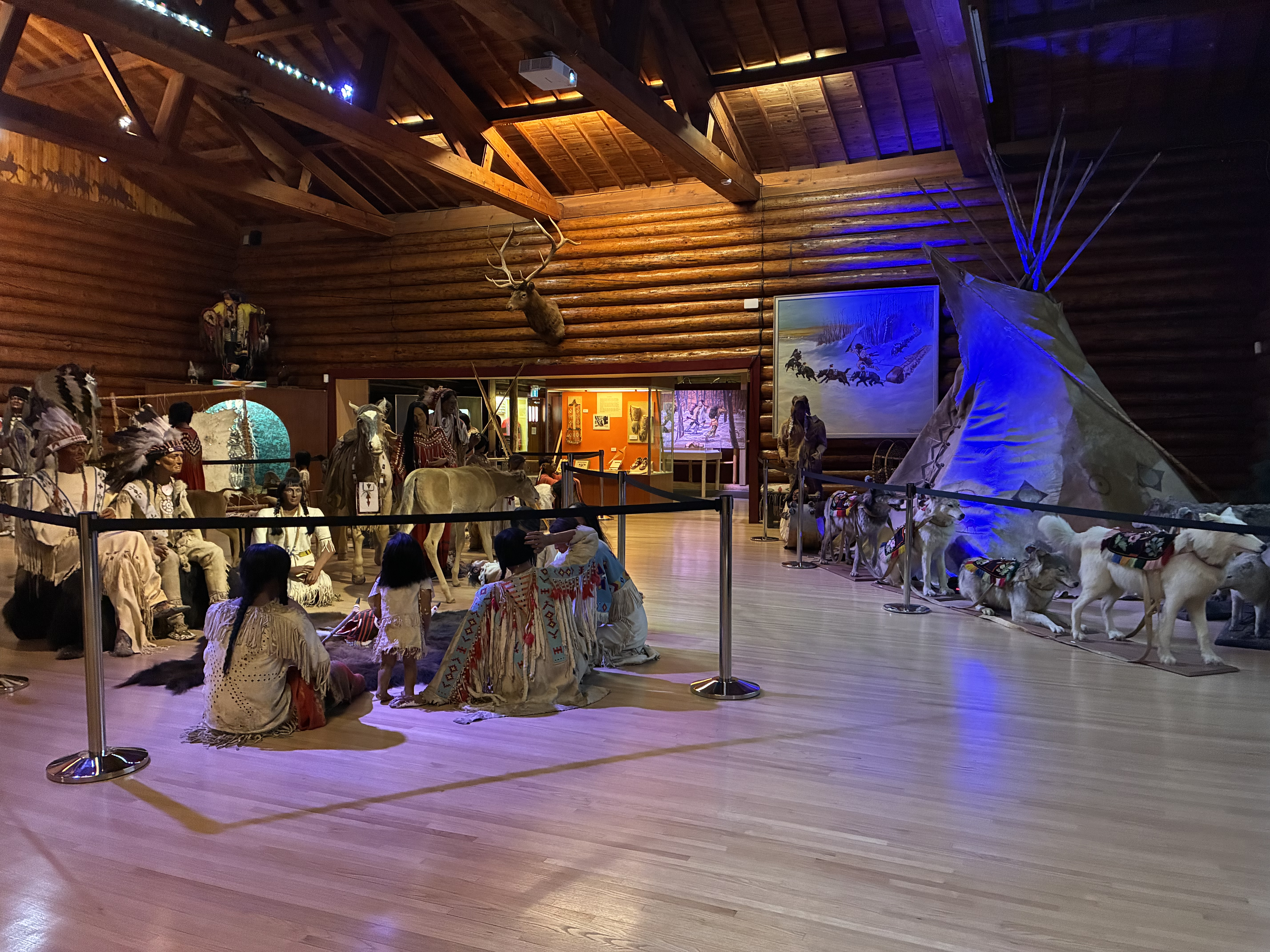
Dioramas in the museum interior

== Events ==
The museum participates in, and hosts, different events throughout the year.

=== Banff Iiniskim Cross-Cultural Powwow ===
The museum produces an annual powwow, which celebrated its 6th anniversary in 2025.

=== Speakers ===
The museum has had guest speakers give presentations. In February 2019, Remo Sommerhalder and Leroy Little Bear gave a presentation about grizzly bears, their experiences with them, and their significance for the First Nations.

== See also ==
- List of museums in Alberta
