= John Voss (sailor) =

German-Canadian sailor

John Claus Voss
- Born: 1858; Schleswig-Holstein
- Died: 1922 (aged 63–64)
- Occupation: Ship Captain

John (sometimes "Jack") Claus Voss (born Johannes Claus Voss; 1858–1922) was a German-Canadian sailor, best known for sailing around the world in a modified dug-out canoe he named Tilikum ("person" or "people" in Chinook Jargon). Initially a carpenter, Voss apprenticed on a ship voyaging around Cape Horn and thereafter lived primarily as a sailor.

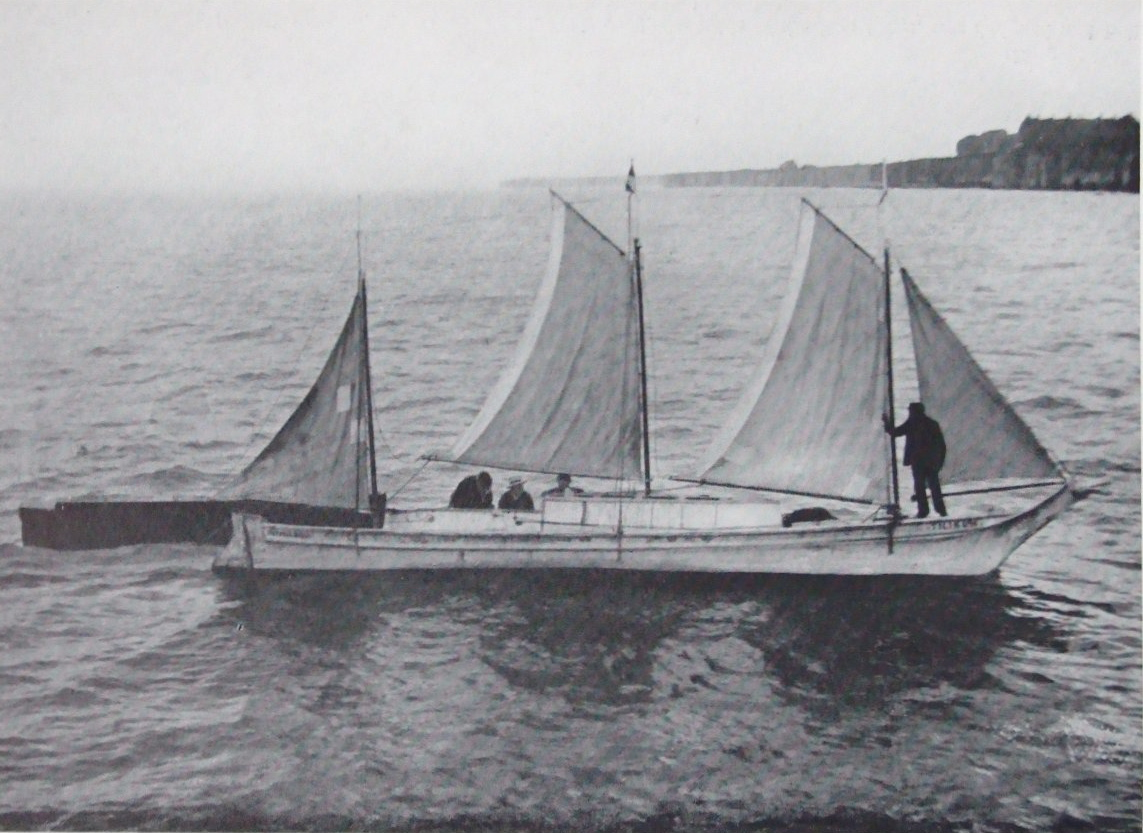
Captain John Voss aboard Tilikum

In 1901, Voss began his most noteworthy voyage with his friend Norman Luxton, ending alone in 1904. He chronicled this and other notable voyages in The Venturesome Voyages of Captain Voss.
