= Bow Valley Crag and Canyon =

Canadian local newspaper in Alberta

Bow Valley Crag & Canyon
- Type: Weekly newspaper
- Format: Tabloid
- Owner: Postmedia
- Founder: Ike Byers
- Founded: December 8, 1900
- Headquarters: Calgary, Alberta
- Circulation: 8,000
- Website: thecragandcanyon.ca

The Bow Valley Crag and Canyon is a weekly local newspaper based in Banff, Alberta, Canada. Publication began on December 8, 1900 as the Crag and Canyon. Like other local newspapers in the Bow Valley, it does not charge customers directly but relies solely upon advertising revenue for income. It is presently owned by the Postmedia Network.

== History ==
The Crag and Canyon, now known as the Bow Valley Crag and Canyon, began publication on December 8, 1900. The paper was started by Ike Byers, a Banff resident who had previously founded the short lived National Park Gazette. It started as a weekly paper with a modest circulation among residents and guests to Banff National Park. Subscriptions cost $1.00 a year or were $0.05 an issue. Despite this meagre cost, the Crag and Canyon lacked financial backing and Byers sold the paper to Robert Brett in February 1902.

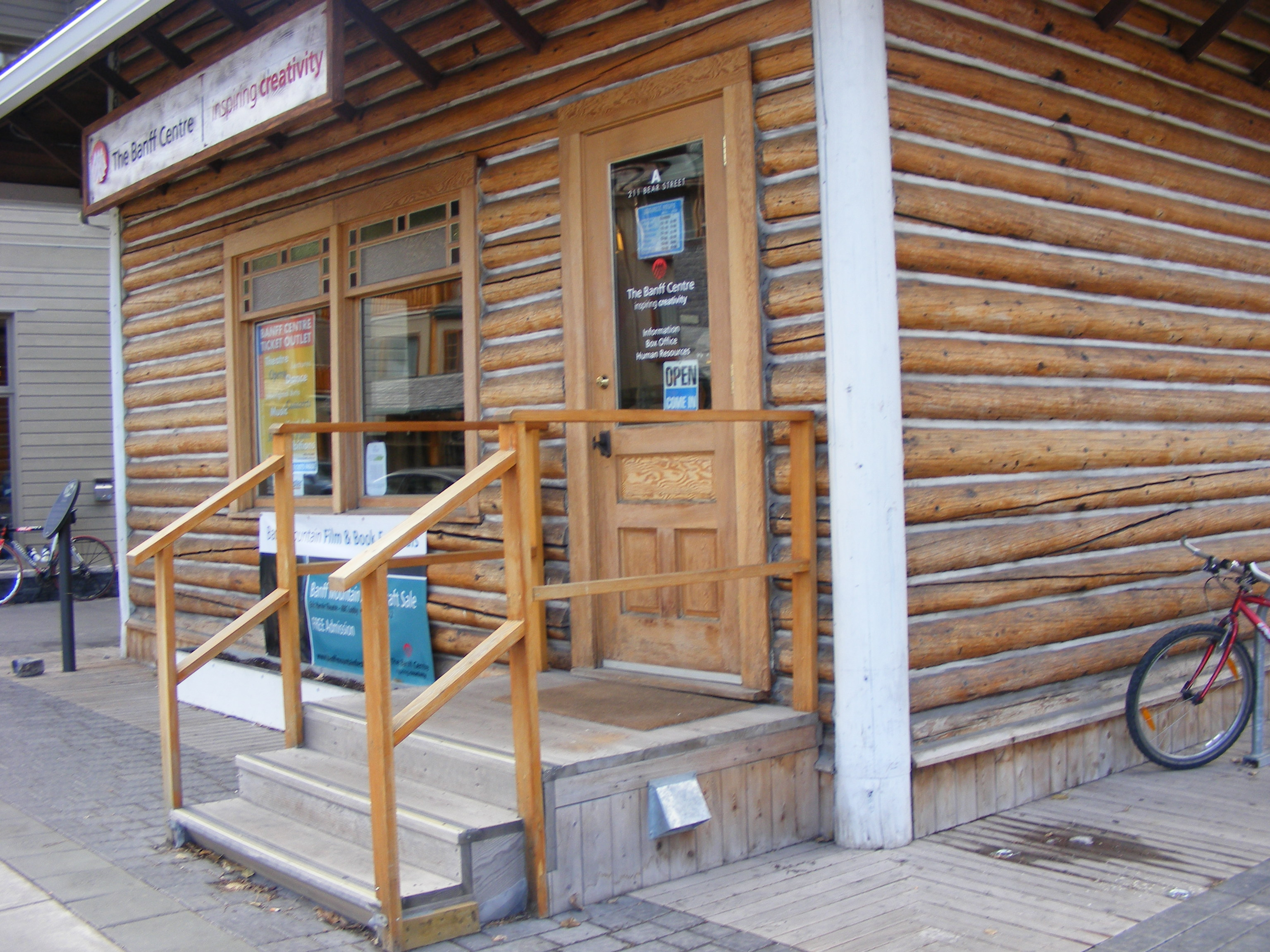
Old Crag Cabin, Banff, Alberta. The publishing location for the Crag and Canyon (1902-1929).

In April 1902, Norman Luxton, a Rocky Mountain pioneer and business owner, made arrangements to purchase the Crag and Canyon from Brett. The May 8, 1902 issue was the first to be produced under Luxton's tenure as owner and publisher. Under Luxton's ownership the paper prospered, although it was used extensively by him as his personal mouthpiece to advance his business and political interests.

The Crag and Canyon remained under Luxton's ownership until 1951 when it was sold to W. I. Clark, a businessman from Calgary. In 1958, Clark renamed the Crag and Canyon to the Banff Crag and Canyon. He sold the paper in 1987 to Black Tusk Holdings, a private equity firm from Vancouver, British Columbia. The paper was later sold to Sun Media.

On July 3, 2013, following the 2013 Alberta floods, Sun Media (now Postmedia) combined the Banff Crag & Canyon and the Canmore Leader under one publication. As of February 2023, the paper has switched to an online news format.

== See also ==
- Similkameen News Leader
- Pique Newsmagazine
- Canmore Leader
- List of newspapers in Canada
