= Reg and Cyril Laxton =

British swimming and diving coaches from the 20th century

Reginald Arthur Laxton (18 August 1909 – 9 March 2006) and Cyril Alfred Laxton (16 June 1912 – 23 July 2006) were English brothers who were two of Britain's top swimming and diving coaches in the mid-20th century.

== Coaching ==
Both coached at the 1936 Summer Olympics at Berlin, and continued coaching at an international level. Reg coached Judy Grinham when she won gold at the 1956 Summer Olympics and Edna Child at the 1950 British Empire Games. Cyril coached Betty Slade the 1938 European springboard champion and Ann Long winner of gold from 3 m and bronze from 10 m at the 1954 British Empire Games and a silver in 1958. Cyril also trained Johnny Weissmuller for the Tarzan films.

== The Laxto ==
Reg invented the Laxto noseclip, for swimming, manufactured by the family firm.

== Writing ==
Reg contributed "Swim with Judy Grinham" to The Girls' Book of Outdoor Life in 1957. He wrote Let's All Go Swimming in 1960.
