= Tilikum (boat) =

Dugout canoe built in the 19th century

Coordinates: 48°25′33.26″N 123°22′7.66″W

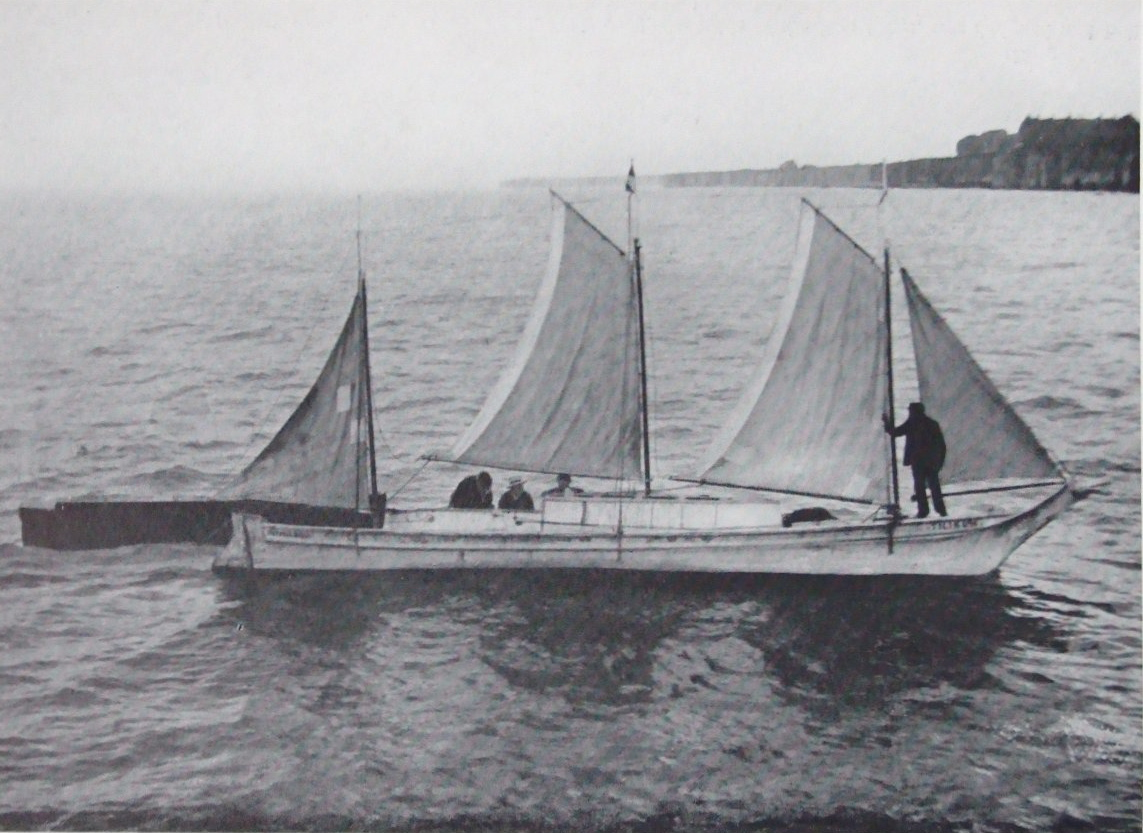
- Tilikum at Margate with Captain John Voss standing at the bows

History

Canada
- Name: Tilikum
- Owner: Unknown Nootka woman
- Cost: $80, in silver, in April 1901
- Laid down: Early 1800s
- Acquired: John Voss, 1901
- Status: Museum ship

General characteristics
- Class & type: Dugout canoe, of red cedar, rigged as a sailing canoe in 1901
- Length: 38 ft. (12 m)
- Sail plan: Gaff-rigged schooner, 230 square ft. (21 m2) sail area, added for 1901 voyage

A map of the voyage of the Tilikum

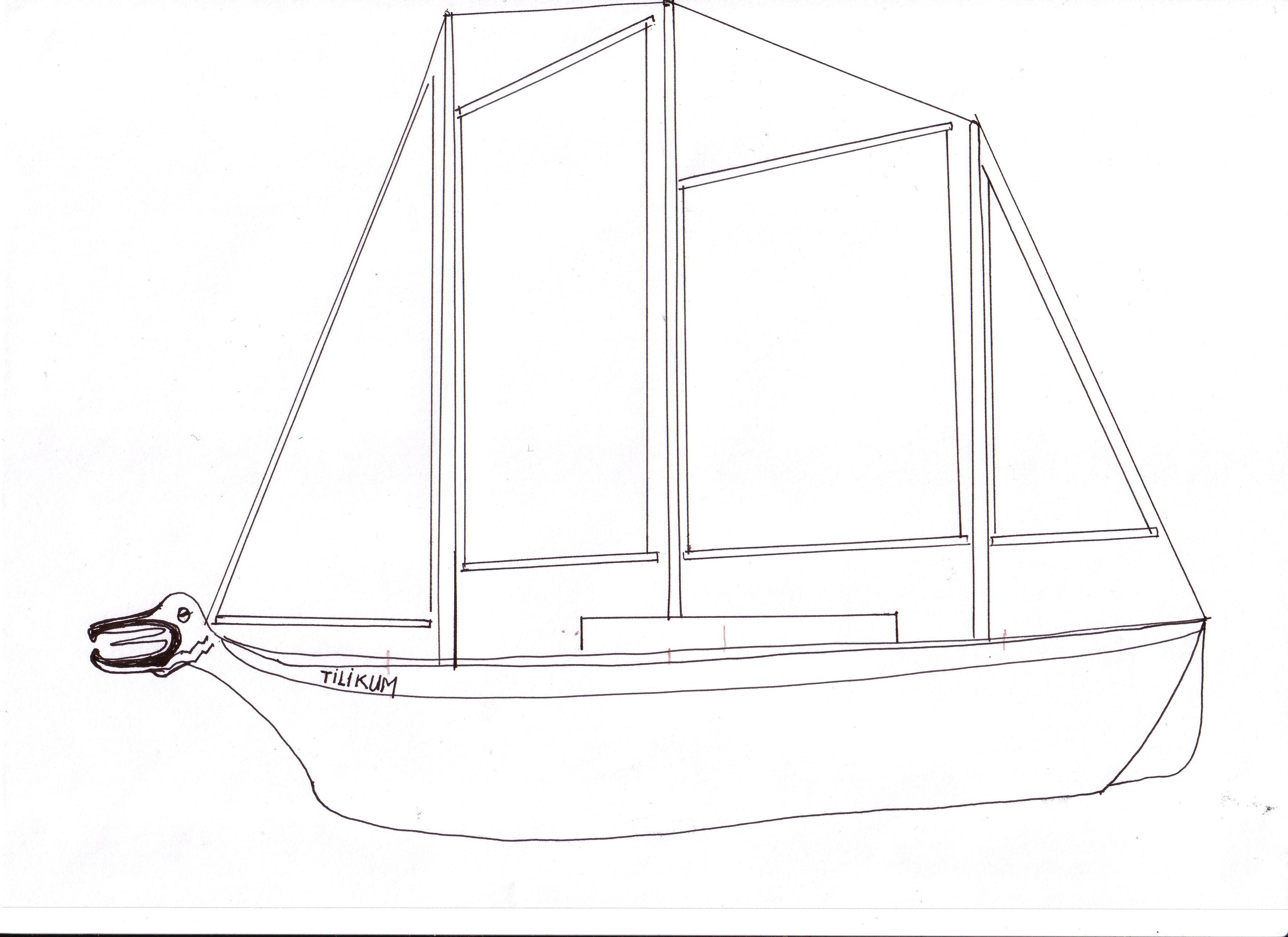
A sketch of the Tilikum in 1901, just before the voyage

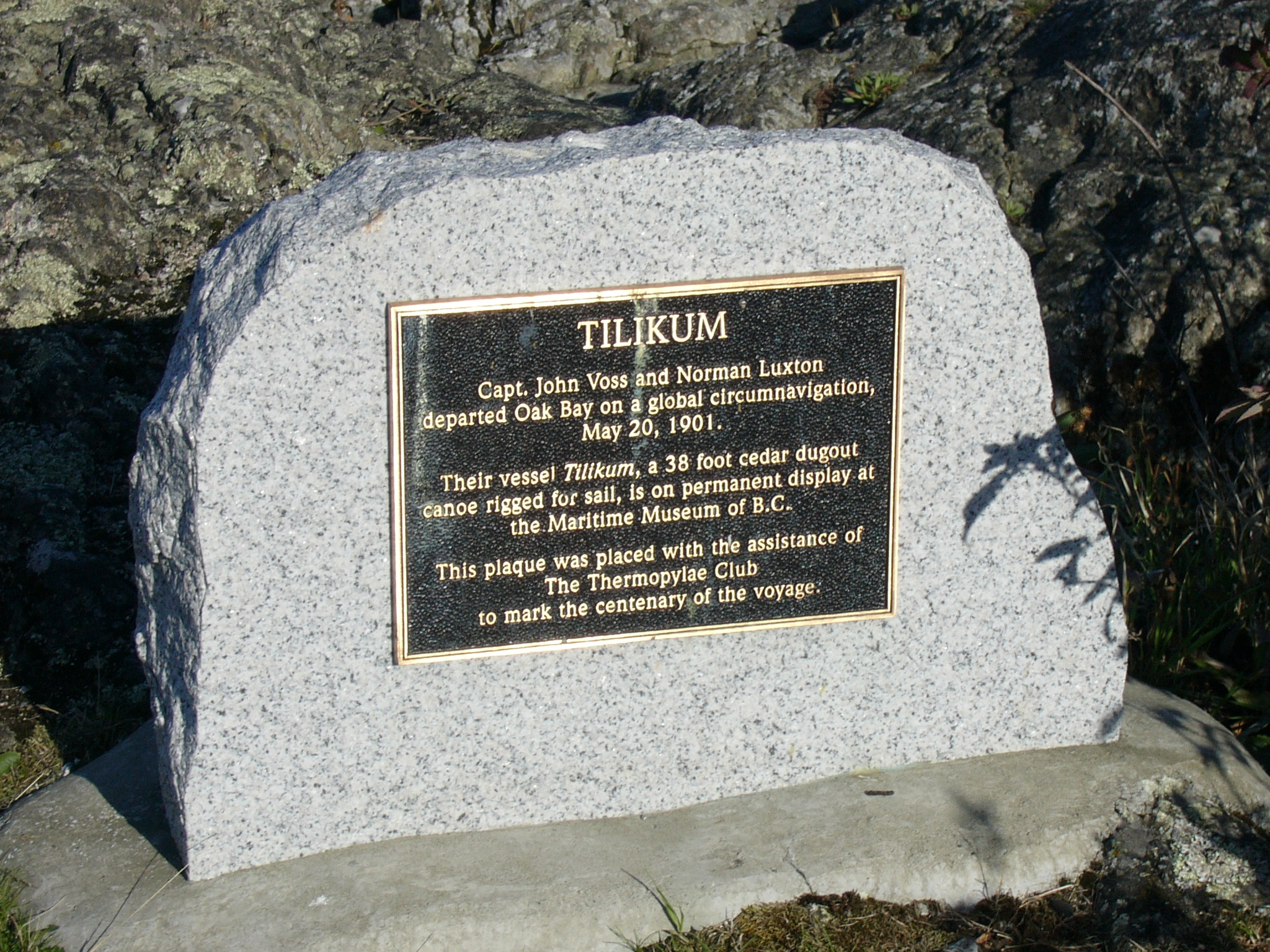
Plaque commemorating the voyage of the Tilikum

Tilikum was a 38-foot (12 m) dugout canoe that was used in an effort to circumnavigate the globe starting in 1901. The boat was a "Nootkan" (Nuu-chah-nulth) canoe which was already old when she was obtained by captain John Voss in April 1901. The boat was built in the early 19th century as a dugout canoe made from a large red cedar log. Tilikum was purchased for $80 in silver from a native woman (Voss describes her as a "siwash") in a transference ceremony allegedly sealed by a bottle of rye whiskey - the name Tilikum means "friend" in Chinook Jargon. Apparently, John Voss and his companion in this venture, Norman Luxton, were inspired by the voyage of Joshua Slocum, who sailed the 37-foot (11 m) sloop Spray around the world a few years earlier and wrote a best selling book about his adventures.

The boat was refitted - reinforced, covered and rigged with sail, 230 square feet (21 m^{2}) in total, and readied for her voyage at a shipyard in Spotlight Cove on Galiano Island BC. Tilikum was then sailed to Oak Bay harbour, then departing from there for the Cook Islands on May 20, 1901, captained by Voss and mated by Luxton. After 10,000 miles (about 16000 km) and five months on the Pacific Ocean, Tilikum struck a reef and Luxton was thrown from the boat. His whole body was badly cut by coral. The boat limped into harbour at Penrhyn Island in the Cook Islands on 2 September 1901, and Luxton left the trip entirely in Suva, Fiji on 17 October 1901. Tilikum was crewed by 10 more men between that time and when she finally pulled into harbour on the Thames in London, England in September, 1904.

On 25 October 1901, after leaving Suva, the mate, Louis Begent, the binnacle, and the compass were lost in 'large breaking seas'. Voss was now alone without a compass, 1,200 miles (1,900 km) from Sydney.

Tilikum arrived in Melbourne on 13 March 1902 and was exhibited in full rig in Collins Street. She was moved to another vantage point at the Exhibition Buildings, but during loading onto a 'wagon', the hook broke and she was damaged, with splits appearing in five different places. Voss repaired her himself using thin steel ribs.

She was then sailed on Lake Wendouree, Ballarat, and presented with a new set of sails by local yachtsmen, before travelling to Geelong to be returned to the sea.

Voss was nominated as a Fellow of the Royal Geographical Society in London after lecturing in Britain about the voyage, but he never completed the process to officially become a fellow.

Captain John Voss published his sailing memoir as The Venturesome Voyages of Captain Voss in 1913. Many years after the voyage, Norman Luxton wrote his own version of the journey with Voss in his Tilikum Journal. This manuscript was edited by his daughter Eleanor and was published after Luxton's death as Tilikum: Luxton's Pacific Crossing in 1971.

Tilikum changed hands a number of times in London, losing her bowsprit and masts over time. In 1929, the Furness Shipping Line returned Tillikum to Victoria, British Columbia. She underwent restoration beginning in 1936 by the Thermopylae Club before she was moved into the Maritime Museum in 1965, where she remained until 2015. Currently, the Maritime Museum of BC, has Tilikum on display at the Ogden Point cruise ship terminal in Victoria, B.C.; due to the cruise terminal's security requirements, she is not on public display.
