= Charlie Laxton =

Australian rules footballer

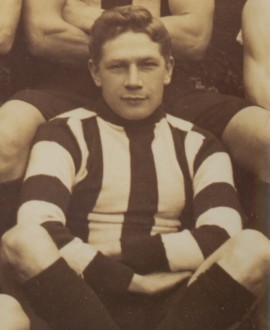
- Laxton in 1914

Personal information
- Full name: Charles Frederick Laxton
- Born: 9 April 1890; Melbourne, Victoria
- Died: 11 January 1964 (aged 73); South Yarra, Victoria
- Original team: Collingwood Districts
- Height: 170 cm (5 ft 7 in)
- Weight: 73 kg (161 lb)

Playing career^{1}
Years	Club	Games (Goals)
1912–1921	Collingwood	147 (89)
- ^{1} Playing statistics correct to the end of 1921.

Charles Frederick Laxton (9 April 1890 – 11 January 1964) was an Australian rules footballer who played for Collingwood in the VFL.

== Family ==
He was the younger brother of Harry Laxton and the son-in-law of Jack Roberts.

== Football ==
Laxton was a member of Collingwood premiership teams in 1917 and 1919. He also played in three losing Grand Finals. A rover who liked the stab pass, Laxton was a Victorian interstate representative in 1919 and 1920.

== Death ==
He died on 11 January 1964.
