= Loxton =

Loxton may refer to:

== Places ==
- Loxton, Somerset, a village in England
- Loxton, Northern Cape, a town in South Africa
- Loxton, South Australia, a locality in Australia
  - Loxton Airport
  - Loxton High School
  - Loxton railway line, a former railway line
  - District Council of Loxton, a former local government area

== People ==
- Alice Loxton (born 1996), English broadcaster and historian
- Bill Loxton (1909–1992), Battle of Britain fighter pilot
- Daniel Loxton (born 1975), editor of Junior Skeptic magazine
- David Loxton (1943–1989), US documentary maker
- Edward Loxton (1864–1935), Australian politician
- Sam Loxton (1921–2011), Australian cricketer, footballer and politician

== Other uses ==
- Loxton House, a heritage-listed former residence in Muswellbrook Shire, New South Wales, Australia
