= William Laxton (surveyor) =

William Laxton (1802–1854) was a British surveyor and author, one of the authors of the 19th century Builder's Price Book.

== Biography ==
Laxton, son of William Robert Laxton, surveyor, and his wife Phœbe, was born in London on 30 March 1802, and was educated at Christ's Hospital. He was a citizen of London, a liveryman of the Haberdashers' Company in 1823, and an active member of the City Philosophical Society.

Brought up as a surveyor, he evinced a great love for his profession, and made himself master of every department. He surveyed and laid down several lines of railway, and was connected with the Hull and Selby, London and Richmond, Surrey Grand Junction, Hull, Lincoln, and Nottingham, Gravesend and Brighton, and Lynn, Wisbech, and Ely railways. Hydraulic engineering was his favourite pursuit, but a work on this subject, which he had designed and for which he had prepared extensive materials, he did not live to write. He constructed water works at Falmouth and Stonehouse, in which he introduced many improvements, and with Robert Stephenson was joint engineer of the Watford Water Company for supplying London with water from the chalk formation.

In October 1837 he projected and established The Civil Engineer and Architect's Journal, a monthly periodical, which he himself edited. He soon after purchased a weekly publication, called The Architect and Building Gazette, and after conducting it for some time united it to the Journal. A work which originated with his father, and was then conducted for thirty years by Laxton and his brother, Henry Laxton, was the Builder's Price Book, which was a standard work in the profession and in the courts of law, and circulated all over the kingdom. Laxton was the surveyor to Baron de Goldsmid's estate at Brighton, where he laid out a large part of the new town in the parish of Hove, and designed and built many of the houses. From the period of its formation in 1840 he was surveyor to the Farmers' and General Fire and Life Insurance Company. He died in London on 31 May 1854, and was interred in the family vault in St. Andrew's burying-ground, Gray's Inn Road.

His only son, William Frederick Laxton, was called to the bar at the Middle Temple on 26 January 1854, and died in 1891. Henry Laxton succeeded to his brother's surveying business.

Laxton was the author of The Improved Builder's Price Book, containing upwards of seven thousand prices, also The Workman's Prices for Labour only, 3rd edit. 1878; the previous editions were by Robert Laxton. This work was afterwards continued annually as the Builder's Price Book.
