= Great West Newspapers =

Canadian newspaper publisher in Alberta

Great West Media L.P.
- Company type: Private
- Industry: Mass media
- Founded: 1995
- Headquarters: 340 Carleton Drive; St. Albert, Alberta; T8N 7L3
- Area served: Alberta
- Key people: Duff Jamison, President and CEO; Brian Bachynski, Executive VP
- Products: 20 weekly newspapers and websites
- Parent: Glacier Media, 50% Jamison Newspapers, 50%
- Subsidiaries: Mountain View Publishing
- Website: www.greatwest.ca

Great West Media Limited Partnership is a Canadian publisher of weekly newspapers in the province of Alberta. It is headquartered in St. Albert, Alberta.

The company is jointly owned by Glacier Media, a Vancouver-based publisher, and the local family business Jamison Newspapers, which operates Great West's properties.

== History ==
Great West was founded in 1995 as a partnership between Southam Inc. and the Jamison family, which had owned the St. Albert Gazette since 1966 (the newspaper itself had been founded in 1961). The Jamisons had run the paper as a family business but prided themselves on professional journalism; the Gazette staff produced a daily newspaper for the 1978 Commonwealth Games in Edmonton.

The Gazette had first partnered with Southam in 1988, when the Jamisons began printing suburban editions of Neighbours, a publication of the Southam-owned Edmonton Journal, as well as some colour comics and television inserts for the Journal and Calgary Herald.

Over the next 15 years, Great West grew its holdings to 20 weekly newspapers across the province. In 1997, Southam was purchased by Hollinger Inc. In 2005, Jamison Newspapers bought out its partner but sold a 50% stake in Great West to Glacier Media. The company built a $25 million office and printing plant in Campbell Business Park. In August, 2012, the company announced that it struck a deal with Postmedia to print the Edmonton Journal. The Journal will begin printing at Great West's facility in the late spring of 2013.

Great West swapped newspapers with Black Press in 2010, gaining the Rocky Mountain Outlook in Canmore, Alberta, and unloading the Red Deer Express, a weekly that competed with Black's daily Red Deer Advocate. The swap was part of a larger deal that saw Glacier sell many of its British Columbia newspapers to Black.

Glacier continued to operate a competing award-winning weekly in St. Albert, the Saint City News, until 2010, when the paper was sold to Great West. Great West closed the Saint City News in 2011, citing a decline in advertising revenue.

== Properties ==
Great West newspapers, all of which are weeklies based in Alberta, are:

- Airdrie City View
- Alberta Prime Times
- Athabasca Advocate
- Barrhead Leader
- Bonnyville Nouvelle
- Cochrane Eagle
- Elk Point Review
- Innisfail Province
- Jasper Fitzhugh
- Lac La Biche Post
- Mountain View Albertan
- Okotoks Western Wheel
- Rocky Mountain Outlook
- Rocky View Weekly
- St. Albert Gazette
- St. Paul Journal
- Sundre Round Up
- TownandCountryToday.com, a news portal for the Athabasca Advocate, Barrhead Leader and Westlock News
- Westlock News

Great West Media also owns 51 Degrees North magazine, a digital and print publication focused on the people of the Bow Valley.

The company also owns several regional publications and an interest in Glacier Media's agricultural publications.

== See also ==
- List of newspapers in Canada
