= Similkameen News Leader =

Newspaper

- Type: Weekly newspaper
- Format: Tabloid
- Founder(s): Dawn Johnson and Sharon Johnson
- Publisher: W. George Elliott
- Founded: 1997
- Ceased publication: 2016
- Headquarters: Princeton, Similkameen Valley, British Columbia
- Circulation: 800
- Website: thenewsleader.net

The Similkameen News Leader was a local and independently owned weekly newspaper serving the Princeton and Keremeos areas of the Similkameen Valley in Southern British Columbia since 1997. The paper's focus was on local stories. It closed in July 2016.

== The News Leader ==
The Similkameen News Leader was established in 1997 by long-time Princeton residents Dawn Johnson and Sharon Johnson (her daughter). The first weekly issue of the News Leader, Volume 1 Number 1, was dated January 6, 1998.

W. George Elliott, another long-time Princeton resident, purchased the News Leader from the Johnsons in 2004, taking over the day-to-day operation on February 1, 2004. He had previously been employed by the Johnsons as the Advertising Sales Manager for the News Leader, beginning in July 2000. Elliott formed his company, Bengel Publishing Inc., in December 2003 in order to purchase the paper from the Johnsons. Dawn Johnson remained on the staff as a part-time reporter for her former employee. Page text.

The News Leader began as an upstart newspaper. The first year was hard. Dawn Johnson recalls, "We got two big breaks at the start. The first was the result of the hill above Ken Thomas' property on Tulameen Road. A 50-million-year-old fish fossil was discovered. It was a big fish and all of it was fossilized. It made news. The next big break came a couple of months later when a grapple loader stole the night deposit vault. Out of all of the time I owned the newspaper, the photo of the grapple loader on Bridge Street ranks up there as number one."

Owner/Publisher W. George Elliott describes the focus of his weekly newspaper:

"We believe in the importance of keeping our small-town paper focused on the local happenings in our small town, which continues to be our focus."

Elliott announced in June 2016 that his paper would soon cease publication. The June 7, 2016 issue carried full coverage of this as well and news that the last issue would be dated July 26, 2016. The 'final eight' issues were branded as Collector's Editions with historic features in each from the past almost twenty years of the Similkameen News Leader.

Elliott was named a Paul Harris Fellow by the Princeton (British Columbia) Rotary Club on November 16, 2016 in honour of the contributions he had made to the community with the Similkameen News Leader.

After 50 weeks had passed following the closure of the printed version of the News Leader, Elliott brought the brand back to life in social media providing frequent daily updates related to a wildfire in the area. The blaze, known as "10 Km NE of Princeton (K60643)," was discovered July 7, 2017 and grew to 3,300 HA. Local road closures, evacuation alerts and orders followed. The Similkameen News Leader gained a following from the coverage it provided along with The Similkameen Gazette, another online source servicing the region.

Elliott was elected to Princeton Town Council as a Councillor on October 20, 2018. He was re-elected to his second four-year term on October 15, 2022, and his third four-year term on October 17, 2026.

In June 2023, the Princeton Museum & Archives Society started to digitize the entire catalogue of Similkameen News Leader issues under agreement with former newspaper owner/publisher W. George Elliott. The intent of the project is to provide complete online access to all of the issues currently stored in the archives of the museum. All 948 editions of the Similkameen News Leader were scanned with the final issue completed on August 16, 2023.

The Princeton Museum launched a new website February 1, 2024 which hosts the complete 940+ weekly digitized issues of the Similkameen News Leader.

== See also ==
- List of newspapers in Canada
