= Glacier Media =

Canadian company

Glacier Media Inc.
- Type: Public
- Traded as: TSX: GVC
- Industry: Business information, business media, community media
- Founded: March 23, 1988
- Headquarters: 2188 Yukon Street, Vancouver, British Columbia, Canada
- Area served: Western Canada
- Key people: Sam Grippo, chairman Jonathon J.L. Kennedy, CEO; Orest Smysnuik, CFO
- Products: Business media and data products, community media
- Revenue: C$260 million (2015)
- Number of employees: 2,224 (2017)
- Divisions: Glacier FarmMedia; JWN Energy Group; Evaluate Energy; UK Energy Strategies Ltd. Glacier Mining Group; Glacier Media Real Estate Division; Business in Vancouver Media Group; Specialty Technical Publications (STP); Environmental Risk Information Services (ERIS); Weather Innovations Consulting; Inceptus Media; Lower Mainland Publishing
- Subsidiaries: Alta Newspaper Group (59%); Continental Newspapers (27.6%); Great West Newspapers (50%); RISN Operations (50%)
- Website: www.glaciermedia.ca

Glacier Media (renamed Lodestar Media on May 1, 2025) is a Canadian business information and media products company. It provides news, market information and sector-specific data within North America and internationally.

Glacier is headquartered in Vancouver. Its primary operations are in Canada as well as London, England. It is publicly traded on the Toronto Stock Exchange. The company provides news, data and analysis in a range of business sectors. These sectors include: Agriculture, Energy, Mining, Real Estate and Environmental Risk. Glacier also owns community newspapers and websites in British Columbia, Alberta and Saskatchewan.

== Key areas of operation ==
Glacier provides business information to several industries.

=== Agriculture ===
Glacier's provides information to farmers regarding technology and techniques to produce crops and rear livestock. The division is called Glacier FarmMedia. It includes publications such as The Western Producer, Manitoba Co-operator, Grainews, Alberta Farmer Express, Canadian Cattlemen and Le Bulletin des agriculteurs. Daily futures market data and commentary is also provided. The division includes an outdoor events business as well as weather information gathered from more than 1,000 weather stations in western Canada. Its weather business focuses on solutions in agro-meteorology, mathematical modelling, database management and internet-based program delivery. Teams are situated primarily in Manitoba and Saskatchewan.

=== Energy ===
Glacier provides company and asset information primarily for Canada's energy industry. It also provides globally-oriented energy data for markets outside of Canada. Its energy division is called JWN Energy Group. Publications include the Daily Oil Bulletin and Oilweek magazine. Canadian operating and asset data is part of the Canoils brand of data products. More globally focused energy data is provided under the Evaluate Energy brand. Glacier Media has a joint venture partnership with Portcullis Public Affairs. In 2016, they jointly created UK Energy Strategies Ltd. Teams are situated in Calgary, Edmonton, London (UK) and India.

=== Mining ===
Mining business information is provided to mine operators, exploration and prospecting companies, mine developers and mining investors. Glacier’s Resource Innovation Group division (formerly InfoMine) gathers news content and mining data, as well as related publications and software, on-line learning courses, career notices and conference information. Glacier produces two mining publications: The Northern Miner, which has been published for more than 100 years, and the Canadian Mining Journal. Also produced by Glacier is MINING.com—an online provider of global mining news and opinion.

=== Real estate ===
Glacier's real estate information division provides real estate listings information for British Columbia via its REW.ca portal. It also publishes Real Estate Weekly, a newspaper focused on new and resale residential home listings in Metro Vancouver, and Western Investor, a monthly commercial real estate newspaper for B.C. and Alberta.

=== Environmental risk ===
Glacier has an environmental risk information division, known as ERIS. It provides information to businesses seeking to identify potential environmental risks on a property. This information is delivered within the United States and Canada. ERIS Canada has been providing this information since 1999. It is aggregated primarily from government sources. In 2013, ERIS expanded into the United States. It provides historical and current environmental risk data and historical products for properties in all 50 states.

=== Regulatory compliance ===
Glacier has a division focused on providing information about regulatory compliance issues. This division is called Specialty Technical Publishers (STP) and information is provided for North America and countries abroad.

=== Weather ===
Glacier has a weather information division that provides weather based monitoring and modelling information. It is called Weather Innovations Consulting LP. Its information is used by agribusinesses, producer organizations, government agencies and researchers. The program was originally launched out of the University of Guelph in Ridgetown, Ontario, Canada.

=== General business media ===
Glacier has a general business group that provides information on Vancouver and British Columbia. This group is called Business in Vancouver Media Group. It contains a weekly newspaper, Business in Vancouver, and a daily news website called BIV.com. The group also produces annual business magazines and business events.

=== Healthcare ===
Glacier Media has a subsidiary for Canadian healthcare professionals to learn about the medical breakthroughs, clinical studies and best practices. The subsidiary is called Inceptus Media.

=== Community media ===
Glacier owns community newspapers and websites in British Columbia, Alberta and Saskatchewan. Glacier purchased its largest newspaper, the Times Colonist of Victoria, British Columbia, in an $86.5 million deal in 2011. The deal included other newspapers formerly held by Postmedia Network. Weekly newspapers include: Bowen Island Undercurrent, North Shore News, Delta Optimist, Burnaby Now, Richmond News, The Prince George Citizen. New Westminster Record, Coast Reporter, The Squamish Chief, Weyburn Review, Whistler Question, and Pique Newsmagazine.

In April 2019, Glacier announced its intent to acquire Castanet Media, owner of the Kelowna-based online publication Castanet.

In October, 2023, Glacier announced it was ceasing operation of the Alaska Highway News and the Dawson Creek Mirror. In Feb 23, 2025, Glacier announced that the community news websites for Burnaby Now and the New Westminster Record would close by April 21, and Tri-City News would close by May 21.

== Sources ==
- Consolidated Financial Statements, December 31, 2015
