= Cross River (British Columbia) =

River in British Columbia, Canada

Coordinates: 50°38′N 115°48′W

The Cross River is a tributary of the Kootenay River in the Canadian province of British Columbia. It is part of the Columbia River basin, as the Kootenay River is a tributary to the Columbia River.

The history regarding this river and Whiteman's Pass across the Continental Divide begins with James Sinclair leading a party of Red River immigrants through the pass in 1841. They left Fort Garry (now the city of Winnipeg) in 1841 with 23 families, including a 75-year-old woman, with an aim to settle in the Oregon Country to reinforce British claims to the area. After a brief stop at Fort Edmonton, he was guided by Maskepetoon, the chief of the Wetaskiwin Cree, via Lake Minnewanka to the present site of Banff, Alberta where the Spray River joins with the Bow River and then south up the Spray River valley where the reservoir now lies. They trekked up the Spray River, then along a tributary, White Man's Creek, and across the Great Divide at White Man's Pass. In his book "The Place of Bows," E.J. Hart suggests that although the party was made up largely of Metis, the presence of a few men from the Maritimes, "seem to account for the name 'Whiteman's' being attached to the pass."

The Reverend Robert Terrill Rundle was also in the area in 1841. After camping at the confluence of the Bow and Spray rivers, Rundle explored the Spray Valley where it parallels the mountain that now bears his name (Appleby 1975).

In 1845, Father Pierre-Jean De Smet, a Jesuit priest, came east from Windermere Lake via the Kootenay River and one of its tributaries to the summit of White Man's Pass "where all was wild sublimity". He erected a large cross on the pass. Father De Smet and British Army Lieutenants Henry James Warre and Mervin Vavasour are said to have met near the summit. Few Europeans were travelling in the Canadian Rockies at this time and it was a remarkable coincidence that the two parties met (Esther Fraser, "The Canadian Rockies" wrote that Warre and Vavasour "probably" used this pass).

Father De Smet built a cross that he referred to as the, "Cross of Peace" near the summit of the pass, and the river which drains the west side of the pass was henceforth known as the Cross River. From White Man's Pass, de Smet travelled down the Spray River, which was "jewelled with enamelled beads", and on out to the foothills (Fraser 1969). He wrote, "The Christian's standard, the cross has been reared at the sources of these two rivers. May it be a sign of salvation and peace to all the scattered and itinerant tribes east and west of these gigantic an luid mountains." The river's indigenous Nakoda ("Stoney") name, Tsha-kooap-te-ha-wap-ta, alludes to the cross erected near the river by Pierre-Jean De Smet in 1845.[1]

Lts. Warre and Vavasour were travelling eastward, returning from a secret mission to determine if troops could be dispatched through the mountains to defend British interests in the southwestern part of the Columbia District. The trip had been encouraged by Sir George Simpson Governor of the Hudson's Bay Company. Warre and Vavasour reported that the mountain passes were unsuitable for troop transport. Of this pass and others, they wrote: "Without attempting to describe the numerous Defiles through which we passed, or the difficulty of forcing a passage through the burnt Forests, and over the high land, we may venture to assert, that Sir George Simpson's idea of transporting troops. . . with their stores, etc. through such an extent of uncultivated Country and over such impracticable Mountains would appear to Us quite unfeasible."

== Course ==
The Cross River originates in Kootenay National Park on the west slopes of the Continental Divide near White Man Pass, in British Columbia. It flows generally south and west, picking up the waters of Mitchell River from the north, before emptying into the Kootenay River.

== See also ==
- List of rivers of British Columbia
- Tributaries of the Columbia River
