= Fort Edmonton =

Series of trading posts in Alberta, Canada (1795–1914)

Fort Edmonton (also named Edmonton House) was the name of a series of trading posts of the Hudson's Bay Company (HBC) from 1795 to 1914, all of which were located on the north banks of the North Saskatchewan River in what is now central Alberta, Canada. It was one of the last points on the Carlton Trail, the main overland route for Metis freighters between the Red River Colony and the points west and was an important stop on the York Factory Express route between London, via Hudson Bay, and Fort Vancouver in the Columbia District. It also was a connection to the Great Northland, as it was situated relatively close to the Athabasca River whose waters flow into the Mackenzie River and the Arctic Ocean. Located on the farthest north of the major rivers flowing to the Hudson Bay and the HBC's shipping posts there, Edmonton was for a time the southernmost of the HBC's forts.

From 1795 to 1830 it was located in four successive locations. Prior to 1821 each location was paired with a Fort Augustus of the North West Company (NWC). Sometimes other fur companies also built forts nearby as well.

The fifth and final Fort Edmonton, 1830–1914, was the one that evolved into present-day Edmonton.

Fort Edmonton was also called Fort-des-Prairies, by French-Canadians trappers and coureurs des bois, and amiskwaskahegan or "Beaver Hills House" in Cree, the most spoken Indigenous language in the region during the 19th century.

In the late 18th century, the HBC, established in 1670, was in fierce competition with the NWC for the trade of animal furs in Rupert's Land.

As one company established a fur trading post, the other would counter by building its post in close proximity or even farther upstream. Expansion up the Saskatchewan River was heated in the 1790s.

== First Fort Edmonton (1795–1802) ==
Coordinates: 53°46′5″N 113°10′19″W In the summer of 1795, Angus Shaw, John MacDonald of Garth and other employees of the North West Company constructed Fort Augustus where the Sturgeon River meets the North Saskatchewan River, just north of the present-day city of Fort Saskatchewan, approximately 35 kilometres (22 mi) northeast of the final Fort Edmonton (near the present-day Alberta Legislature Building in Edmonton).

A few months later (on October 5, 1795), a HBC crew arrived nearby and began to construct Edmonton House, taking advantage of the same two rivers. In a possible revelation of the competitive nature of the companies, the distance between Fort Augustus and Edmonton House was described as being a "musket-shot" apart, yet the forts' proximity offered mutual security to the European traders of both companies in a land where they were all intruders.

Edmonton House and its subsequent incarnations were named by John Peter Pruden, clerk to the HBC's George Sutherland. The Fort was named after Edmonton, Middlesex, England, birthplace of both Pruden and HBC Deputy Governor Sir James Winter Lake.

In addition to the NWC-HBC rivalry, two or three other fur-trading posts were built nearby. Grants Company, independent fur buyer Francois Beaubien and the new North West Company (XY Company) reportedly built forts near Fort Edmonton/Fort Augustus located at Fort Saskatchewan and Rossdale.

The area adjacent to Fort Edmonton was site of a major wildfire in 1798. It took eight lives.

== Second Fort Edmonton (1802–1810) ==
Coordinates: 53°31′44″N 113°29′53″W

In 1802, due to several years of low fur returns and increasingly scarce firewood, Fort Edmonton and Fort Augustus were moved upstream, to what is now the Rossdale area of downtown Edmonton. This area had been a gathering place for aboriginals in the region for thousands of years, in part due to its location along the old North Trail, AKA the Wolf's Track.

It is possible the HBC officials on the ground might have adopted a new name for the new fort. But an 1800 directive from HBC main offices in London had instructed them to stop switching names. (Later after Fort Edmonton was moved to its third site, the head office staff instructed them to stop using the same name for differently-located forts. It is from this muddle that the present-day City of Edmonton bears the name that it does.)

The first woman of European descent known to live in this region was the French-Canadian Marie-Anne Lagimodière (née Gaboury), who was also noteworthy as the grandmother of Louis Riel. She had accompanied her fur trader husband, Jean-Baptiste Lagimodière, into the west shortly after their marriage in Trois-Rivières, Lower Canada, and was known to take part in hunting expeditions. The couple lived in Fort Augustus from 1807 to 1811.

John Rowand, the Chief Factor at Fort Edmonton from 1823 to 1854, first worked at Fort Augustus from 1804 to 1806; he was stationed there again from 1808 onward.

Evidence of this Fort Edmonton was found in 2012, when crews were excavating under a demolished machine shop at the Rossdale Power Plant.

== Third Fort Edmonton (1810–1812) ==
Coordinates: 54°3′40.88243″N 112°16′11.9″W

Both Fort Augustus and Fort Edmonton moved to the mouth of White Earth Creek, 100 km northeast of modern Edmonton at the northernmost point of the North Saskatchewan near present-day Smoky Lake, Alberta. The fort was also known as Fort White Earth, or Terre Blanche. This is located in Township 58-16-W4.

While the Hudson's Bay Company and North West Company still operated separate posts, in direct competition with each other, the two posts were built inside a shared palisade.

This post was only in operation for two years because Cree trappers were selling their furs at other posts to avoid violent confrontations with the Blackfoot, yet the Blackfoot, moving around mostly south of the river, were reluctant to travel far off of their normal circuit and consequently took their furs south to American trading posts.

After its abandonment in 1812, the forts fell into ruin and little remains of them. There is no official signage on the site. Perhaps a local name for a creek that enters the Saskatchewan on the south side of the river opposite the site commemorates the old forts - its name is Fort Creek.

== Fourth Fort Edmonton (1812–1830) ==
Coordinates: 53°31′44″N 113°29′53″W

Fort Edmonton and Fort Augustus moved back to the second site at the Rossdale flats, it having proven to be a site more amenable for Natives to visit. This was the start of recorded permanent human occupancy in the present city of Edmonton.

A crew of workers was sent from Fort Edmonton at White Earth to begin construction of a new post at the Rossdale location on October 6, 1812. Post Factor James Bird marked out the layout of the new post on October 10. James Bird's son William Bird was born at Fort Edmonton and later played a role in the naming of today's Mill Creek.

In the years immediately succeeding that move, the two furtrading companies, the HBC and the NWC, had a strong and violent rivalry, peaking with the Battle of Seven Oaks at Winnipeg.

Violence broke out at Edmonton in 1826 when fort staff fought off an attempt by several Nakoda to steal some of the fort's horses. Six Nakoda were killed and five Bay men wounded in a brisk exchange of gunfire and arrow-flight. Already by that time, horses were being kept at Horse Hill in what is now northeast Edmonton.

The Hudson's Bay Company and the North West Company merged in 1821. After the amalgamation, the companies used the Hudson's Bay Company name. The name Fort Augustus was dropped, and John Rowand, the former NWC factor, became chief trader of the HBC's Fort Edmonton. Fort Edmonton became the headquarters for the Saskatchewan District of Rupert's Land, which stretched from the Canadian Rocky Mountains in the west to Fort Carlton in the east; from the 49th parallel in the south to Lesser Slave Lake in the north. In 1823, Rowand was promoted to chief factor. Rowand managed Saskatchewan District from Fort Edmonton until his death in 1854.

== Fifth Fort Edmonton (1830–1915) ==
Coordinates: 53°31′55″N 113°30′24″W

Due to floods in the late 1820s, a new fort was built on the terrace above the riverflats in 1830. This fifth and final fort stood for 85 years, though its use as a fur trading post was phased out starting in 1891. During its final years, the Fort co-existed with the Alberta Legislature Building. The Legislative Building opened in 1913 on a terrace just north of the fort on the site of "Rowand's Folly", the large house built for Chief Factor John Rowand.

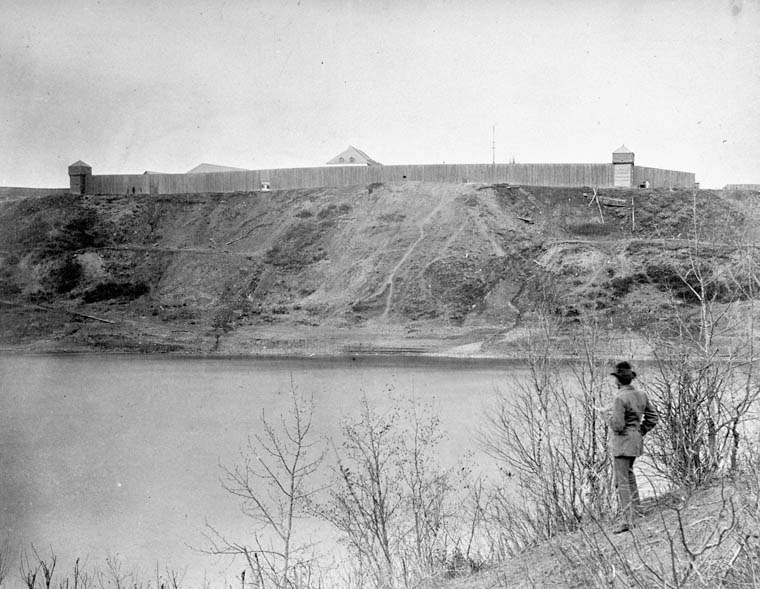
Fort Edmonton, 1870.

=== Rowand's administration ===
At this time, a long-serving member of the HBC, John Edward Harriott, became the chief trader under Rowand. The two gained family ties when Harriott married one of Rowand's daughters. On a couple of occasions when Rowand joined HBC Inland Governor George Simpson for travel abroad, Harriott acted as chief factor.

Rowand's administration from the 1830s onward coincided with a great change in the Saskatchewan District. For the first time, missionaries, artists, and curious travellers came to Edmonton to visit, sometimes for extended periods. This frustrated Rowand to some degree. Prior to this time, the only Europeans to come that far into the west were men on some sort of company business.

With Rowand making Edmonton his home, the fort became an important centre in the west. It was a necessity for any traveller going any further west of Edmonton to go through there for provisions first. Rowand constructed a three-storey house in the heart of the fort for the exclusive use of him and his family, denoting his station to his subordinates, visitors and trade partners alike. This was nicknamed "Rowand's Folly."

==== Influx of missionaries ====
Two Catholic missionaries, Francois-Norbert Blanchet and Modeste Demers, were the first to visit Fort Edmonton (called Fort-des-Prairies) in 1838. Starting in 1840, the Fort housed the Wesleyan missionary Robert Rundle as a company chaplain. Rundle's tenure lasted until 1848, and his ministry and missionary work was met with competition of a sort by Jean-Baptiste Thibault, a Catholic priest who, like Rundle, was attempting to evangelize natives in the area. A chapel was erected inside the fort in 1843, which the Reverend Rundle boasted could host "(one) hundred Indians"; the structure also had two small rooms for Rundle's private use. Meanwhile, Rowand complained that the presence of ministers in his fort was a distraction for the natives, and was ostensibly impeding the fur trade business. On a personal level, however, Rowand had taken a liking to Rundle, and entrusted the minister with teaching his children.

Father Pierre-Jean De Smet spent the winter of 1845-46 at Fort Edmonton having traveled and explored from Oregon Country to meet the natives of the Rocky Mountains.

In 1852, the Oblate missionary Albert Lacombe first visited Fort Edmonton. With Rundle having trouble controlling the department in 1848, Lacombe easily took up residence in the former Methodist chapel. Lacombe took pity on the fur trade labourers, opining that, "during the summer months, [Hudson's Bay labourers' toil] was as hard as that of the African slave.". He found little sympathy for the workers from John Rowand or the HBC clerks. The following year, Lacombe moved to Lac St. Anne, but had a new Catholic chapel constructed in the fort in 1857 (but did not dwell there); this chapel lasted nearly twenty years before being moved outside of the fort.

A Methodist follow-up to Robert Rundle, Reverend Thomas Woolsey, was dispatched to Edmonton in 1852. His arrival in the fort coincided with Lacombe's residency in the former Methodist chapel, a discovery which distressed Woolsey. Conflicts and private frustrations with Catholic missionaries, and failures to convert Catholics to Protestantism, marked Woolsey's twelve-year residence at the fort.

In 1854, the mission St. Joachim was officially founded in turn at Fort-des-Praires (Fort Edmonton).

==== Oregon mission ====
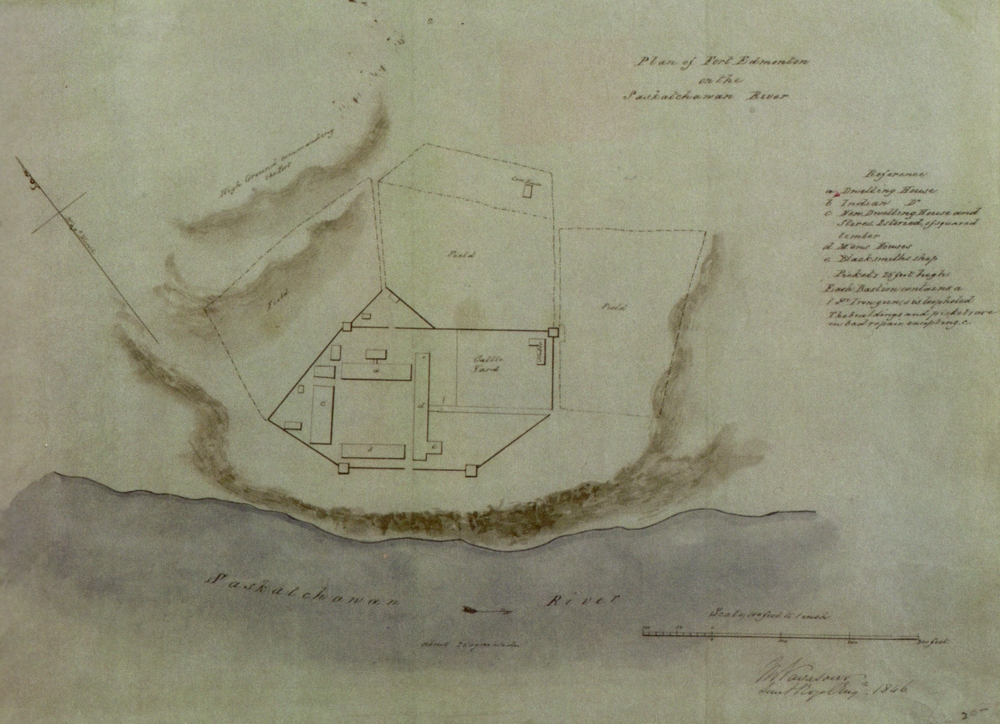
This watercolor with a scale diagram of the Fort was drawn by Vavasour in 1846.

Though somewhat distant from the territory in question, Fort Edmonton, an important stop on the York Factory Express overland trade route, was peripherally involved in the Oregon Boundary Dispute. A pair of British Army lieutenants, Mervin Vavasour and Henry James Warre, were sent on a mission in the guise of eccentric gentlemen to reconnoitre the lower Columbia River valley and Puget Sound. Among other objectives, they were to determine which HBC posts could be used in a military conflict. The trip had been encouraged by Sir George Simpson Governor of the Hudson's Bay Company. Warre and Vavasour reported that the mountain passes were unsuitable for troop transport. Their mission took them through Fort Edmonton in the fall of 1845, and again on their way back to Montreal in 1846. They wrote: "Without attempting to describe the numerous Defiles through which we passed, or the difficulty of forcing a passage through the burnt Forests, and over the high land, we may venture to assert, that Sir George Simpson's idea of transporting troops. . . with their stores, etc. through such an extent of uncultivated Country and over such impracticable Mountains would appear to Us quite unfeasible." As with other forts he visited on this mission, Vavasour drew a plan of Edmonton.

==== Other notable visitors ====
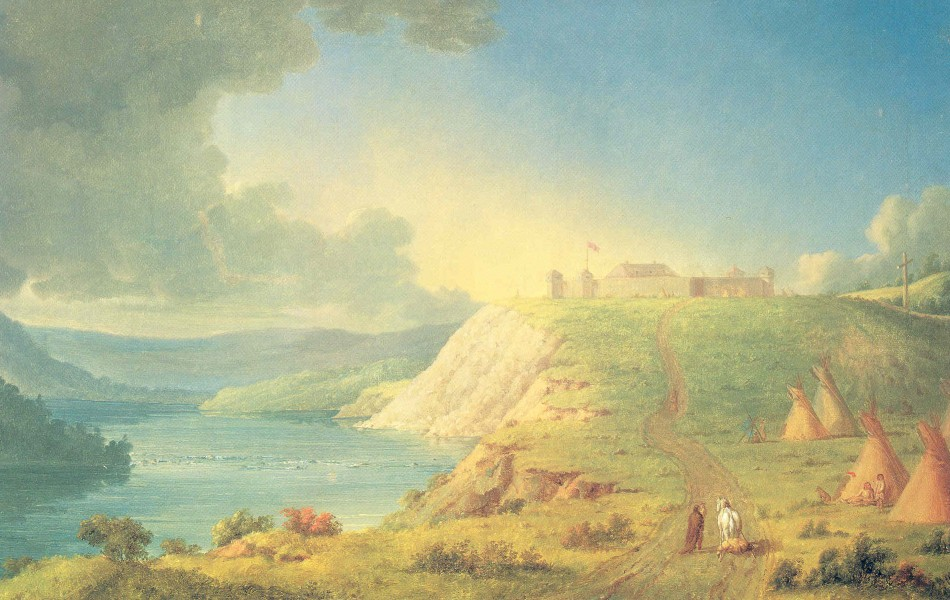
Artist Paul Kane's romanticized painting of the fifth fort (1849, from 1846 sketch), displaying Rowand's house rising high above the palisade.

The artist Paul Kane first visited the fort in 1845. He produced several works of art based upon his time there.

==== Rowand's end ====
In May 1854, John Rowand died while accompanying the annual York Boat trip eastward. Accounts suggest that he tried to break up (or join) a skirmish between some of the tripmen while at Fort Pitt, and in his rage he fell suddenly dead. He was initially buried at Fort Pitt, but was later exhumed and buried in Montreal as per his last will and testament.

=== Remaining years ===
==== Remaining administrators ====
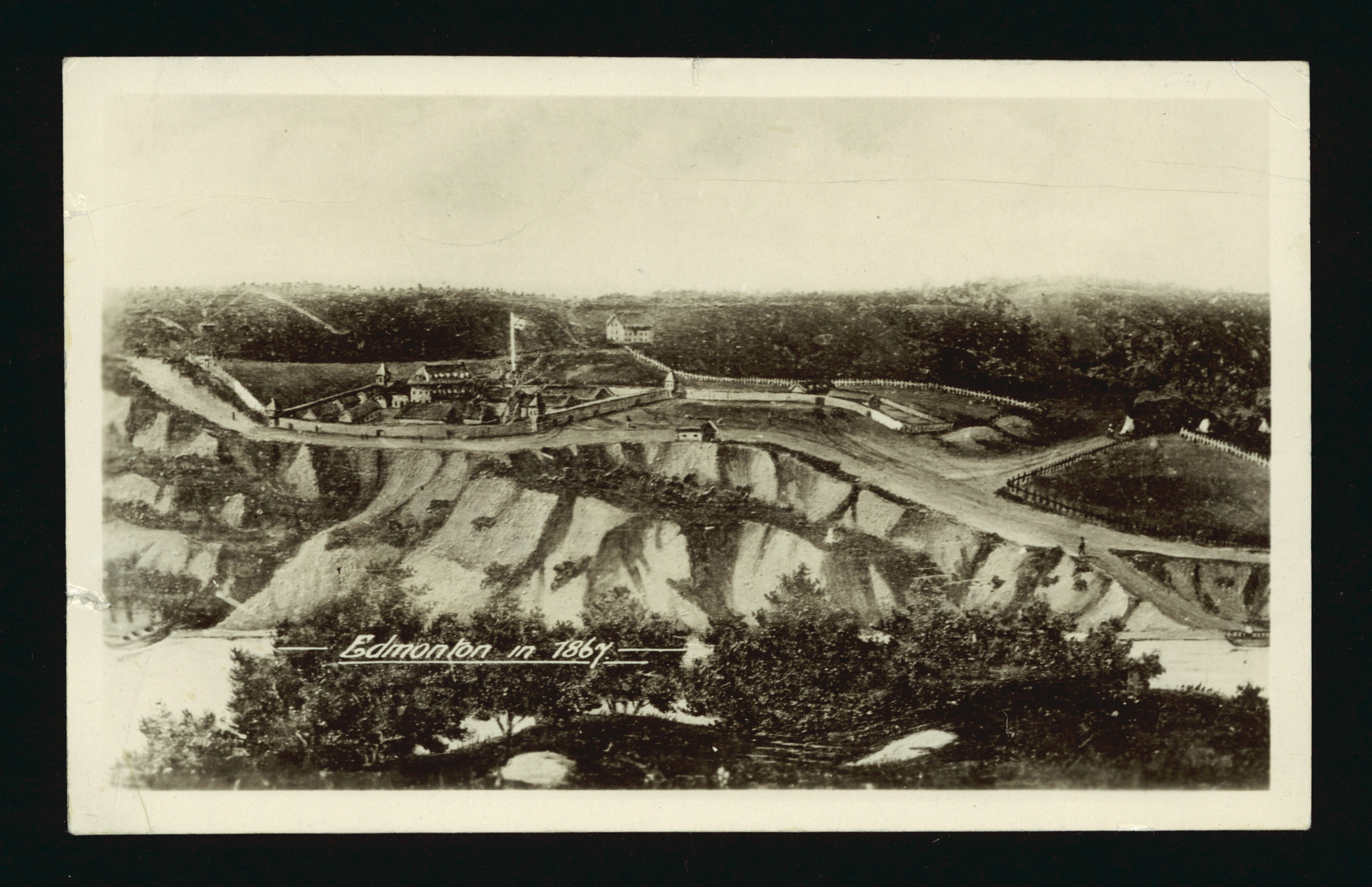
A charcoal sketch of Fort Edmonton circa. 1867.

Following a few short-lived administrations in Rowand's wake, William J. Christie was a long-lasting chief factor at Edmonton from 1858 to 1872. Christie's protégé Richard Charles Hardisty, later a Canadian Senator, served as chief factor in Edmonton for an interim period from 1862 through 1864.

The Hudson's Bay Company relinquished Rupert's Land to the Government of Canada in 1868, pursuant to the Rupert's Land Act 1868, thus ending the HBC's administration of the vast territory and beginning an era of settlement in the 1870s.

By the 1890s, the fort was in disrepair and largely abandoned. The Hudson's Bay Company transitioned to retail stores, and business in Edmonton ran from one of those instead.

==== Explorers ====
In 1841 James Sinclair stopped at Fort Edmonton to receive instructions on where to cross the Rockies. With him were about 116 to 121 mostly Métis settlers from the Red River Colony, hired by the Pugets Sound Agricultural Company to settle on Fort Nisqually and Cowlitz Farm within modern Washington state.

Captain John Palliser stayed in Fort Edmonton for a time in 1858 while on his famous expedition. With the help of the factor's wife, Palliser held a ball there.

In 1859, the 9th Earl of Southesk visited on his way to the Rocky Mountains, hoping that the fresh mountain air would improve his health. He recorded his observations in the 1874 book Saskatchewan and Rocky Mountains and also published a book on Cree syllabics in 1875.

Viscount William Milton and William Butler Cheadle came through Edmonton in 1862/3 and published accounts of their journey.

==== Under threat of warfare ====
The spring of 1870 saw Fort Edmonton come under the threat of violence due to a war between the Blackfoot and Cree, resulting from the slaying of Cree Chief Maskepetoon. A group of the Blackfoot approaching the fort from the south caught some traders with wagons of goods on the south bank, in today's Walterdale neighbourhood of Edmonton. The traders escaped by ferry but had to leave their wagons behind. The ferry was not sent back to the Blackfoot and they were not able to give chase to the fleeing traders as they were unable to ford the North Saskatchewan due to high spring waters. Th Blackfoot encamped nearby, plundered the wagons and harassed the fort with their muskets. The men in the fort armed themselves and prepared to fight. But the fort was not attacked in force. Chief Factor William J. Christie ordered the Bay men not to go out to attack the Blackfoot, apprehensive that to do so would invite further violence against the Hudson's Bay Company.

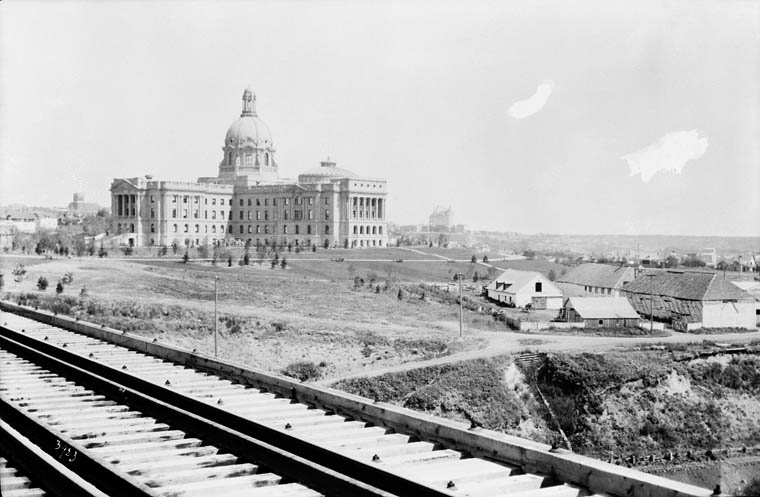
Fort Edmonton, near the new Legislature Building, 1914.

Fifteen years later, on March 19, 1885, during the North West Rebellion, the telegraph wire connecting Edmonton to the rest of the world was cut. Fearing imminent attack, many local settlers and their families took shelter within the fort's old wooden palisade walls. No attack happened. Within a few weeks, marching and mounted troops arrived from southern Alberta and from eastern Canada by way of the CPR station at Calgary, to ensure that no local outbreak would occur. Most of the soldiers went on out to chase down Big Bear and his band.

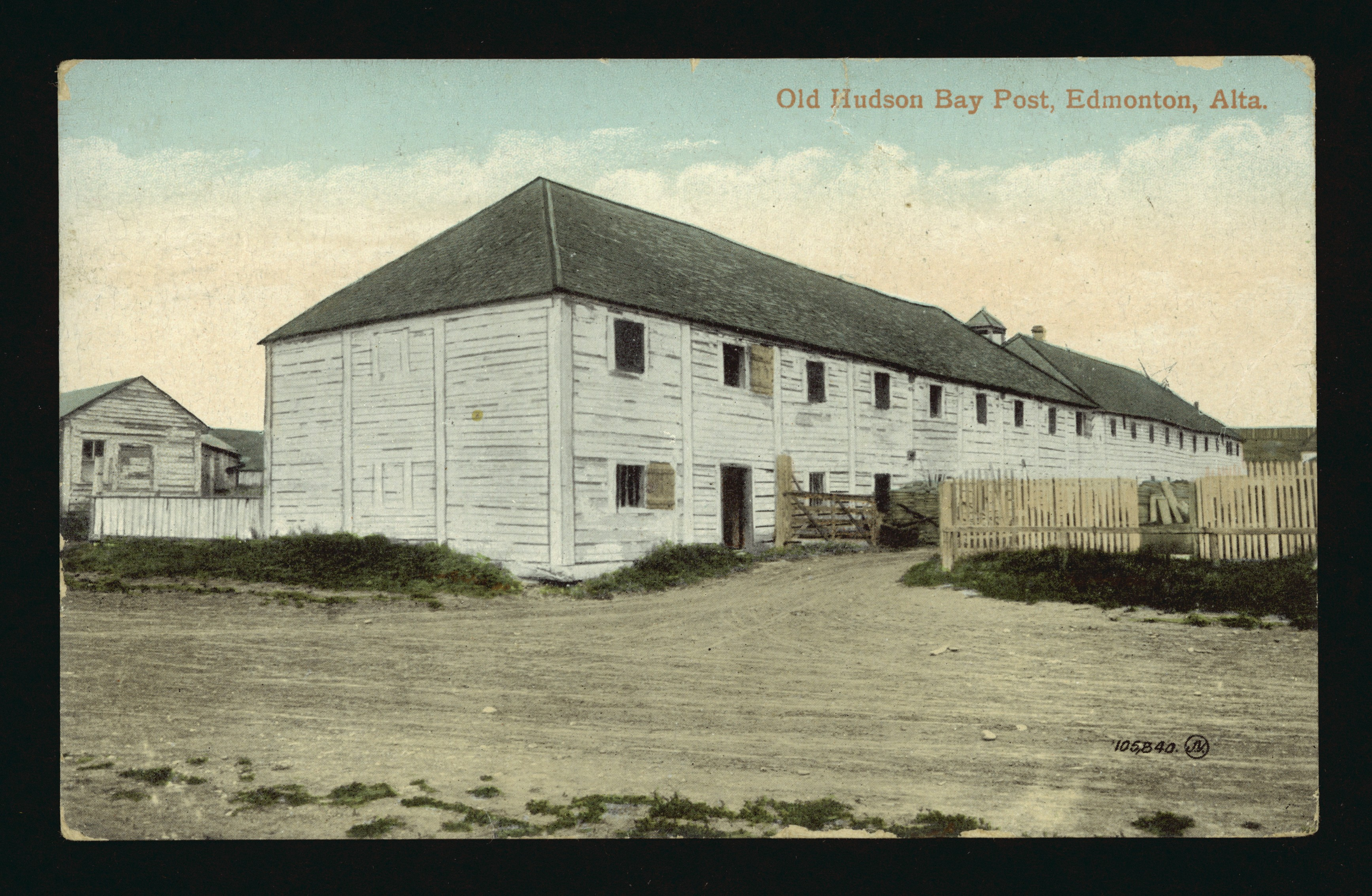
View of the Old Hudson's Bay Company Fort Edmonton Buildings circa. 1912.

==== Dismantling ====
What remained of the fifth Fort Edmonton was dismantled in October, 1915. It was seen as a crumbling eyesore next to the Alberta Legislature Building, which had been completed three years earlier. The Government of Alberta indicated at the time that it would use the old fort's timbers to create a heritage site elsewhere in the city, but it never did. A few were saved and still possibly exist in city museums or in Rowand House, but most were said to be accidentally burned in a Boy Scout jamboree in May 1937.

== List of chief factors ==
Chief factors at Fort Edmonton
Chief factor	Years served	Notes
William Tomison	1795–1796	Started Edmonton House to compete with NWC Fort Augustus.
George Sutherland	1796–1797	
William Tomison	1797–1798	
James Curtis Bird	1799–1816	The fort was relocated twice during Bird's tenure.
Hugh Carswell	1816–1817	
Francis Heron	1817–1821	HBC and NWC merger coincides with the end of Heron's tenure; afterward, Fort Augustus was absorbed into Fort Edmonton.
James Sutherland	1821–1822	
John Rowand	1823–1840	Longest-serving chief factor at Edmonton.
John Edward Harriott	1841–1842	Rowand's chief trader and son-in-law by country marriage.
John Rowand	1842–1846	
John Edward Harriott	1847–1848	
John Rowand	1848–1854	Final years of service; died May 30, 1854.
William Sinclair	1854–1857	
John Swanston	1857–1858	
William J. Christie	1858–1872	
Richard Charles Hardisty	1872–1883	Later a Canadian senator.
James MacDougall	1883–1885	
Richard Charles Hardisty	1885–1888	
Harrison S. Young	1888–1891	
William T. Livock	1891–1910	Transitioned to the retail store located on Jasper Avenue in what is now Edmonton's downtown core. The outward face of an old HBC department store still exists there, but the building is presently inhabited by a branch of the U of A and the Edmonton Public Library. It is currently known as Enterprise Square.

== Legacy ==
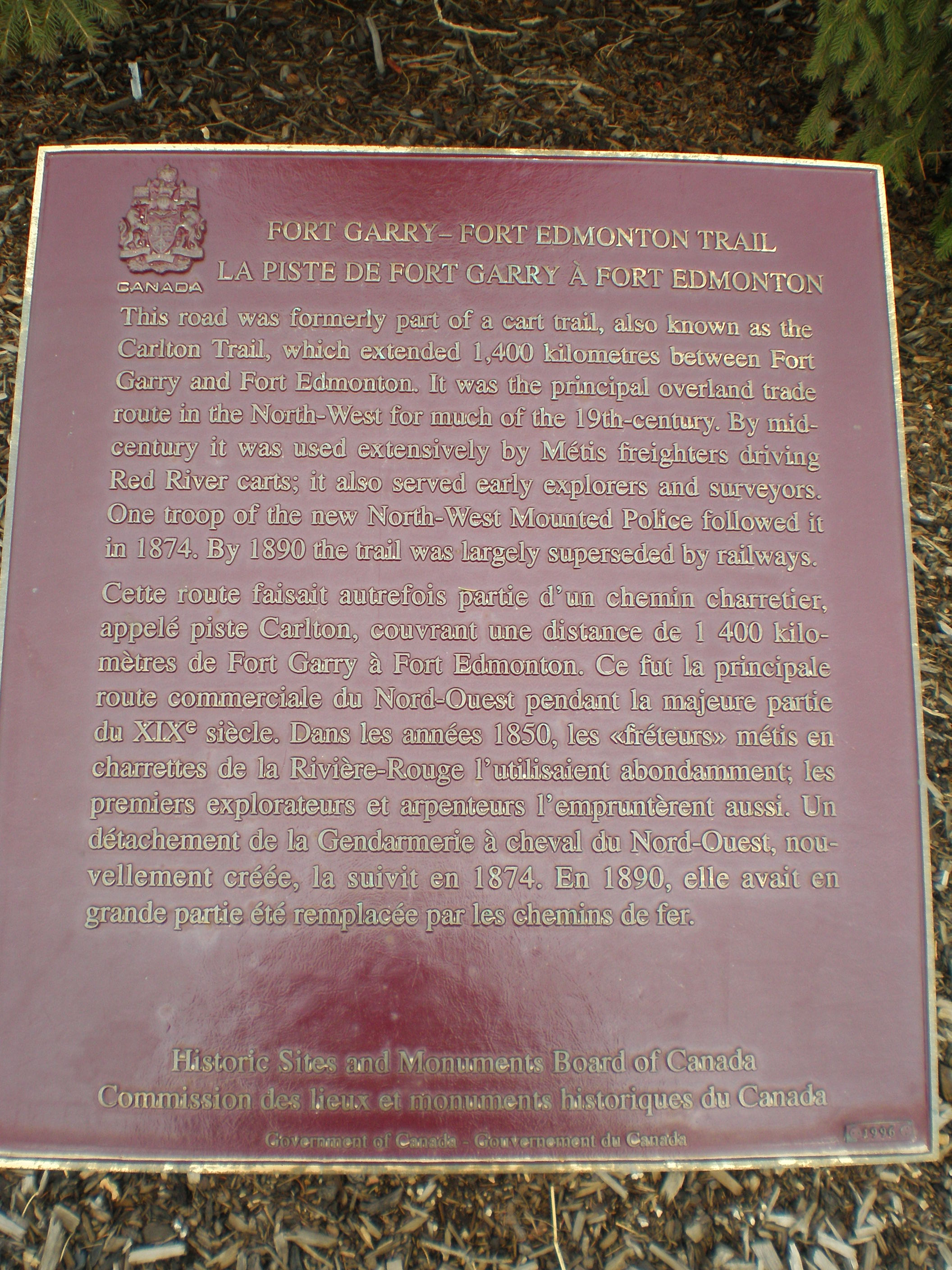
A Historic Sites and Monuments Board of Canada plaque installed in 1996 in Edmonton to commemorate the Fort Edmonton-Fort Gary Trail.

In 1923 the suspected site of the original Forts Augustus and Edmonton at Fort Saskatchewan was declared a National Historic Site of Canada, and a plaque was placed on the site.

In 1959, the site of the fifth Fort Edmonton (Fort Edmonton V) was also made a National Historic Site and plaque was installed near the Alberta Legislature building.

Similarly the Fort Edmonton-Fort Gary Trail was also named a National Historic Site and a plaque for it was installed in Edmonton in 1996.

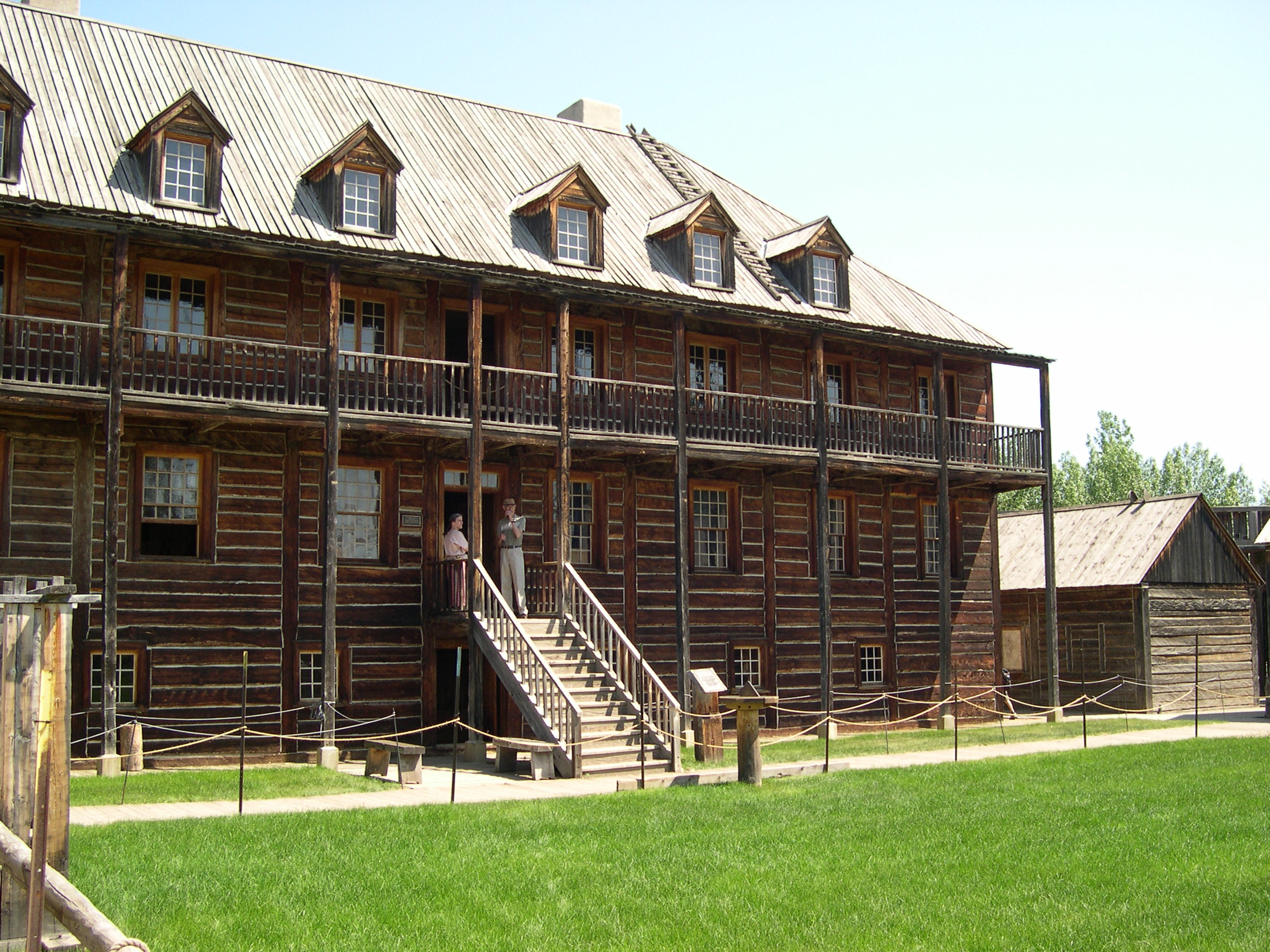
Fort Edmonton Park

=== Fort Edmonton Park ===
In 1969, a reconstruction of the fifth Fort Edmonton began five kilometres upstream from its final site, representing it as it stood in 1846, but this time on the south bank of the North Saskatchewan River. This marked the beginning of Fort Edmonton Park, which has become one of the city's tourist attractions. The park represents, through various historical buildings, four distinct time periods, exploring Edmonton's development from a fur trade post in the vast Northwest, to a settled urban centre after the First World War.

== See also ==
- Saskatchewan River fur trade

== Bibliography ==
- Goyette, Linda; Roemmich, Carolina Jakeway (2004), Edmonton: In Our Own Words, Edmonton, AB: University of Alberta Press, ISBN 0-88864-449-3
- Galbraith, John S. (1954), "The Early History of the Puget's Sound Agricultural Company, 1838-43", Oregon Historical Quarterly, 55 (3), Oregon Historical Society: 234–259
- Rundle, Robert (1977), Hutchinson, Gerald; Dempsey, Hugh Aylmer (eds.), The Rundle Journals, 1840-1848, Calgary: Alberta Records Publications Board
- Silversides, Brock (2005), Fort de Prairies: The Story of Fort Edmonton, Surrey, BC: Heritage House Publishing, ISBN 1-894384-98-9
- Simpson, George (1847), An Overland Journey Round the World, during the Years 1841 and 1842., Philadelphia: Lea and Blanchard
