= Robert Terrill Rundle =

Cornish Methodist missionary

The Reverend Robert Terrill Rundle
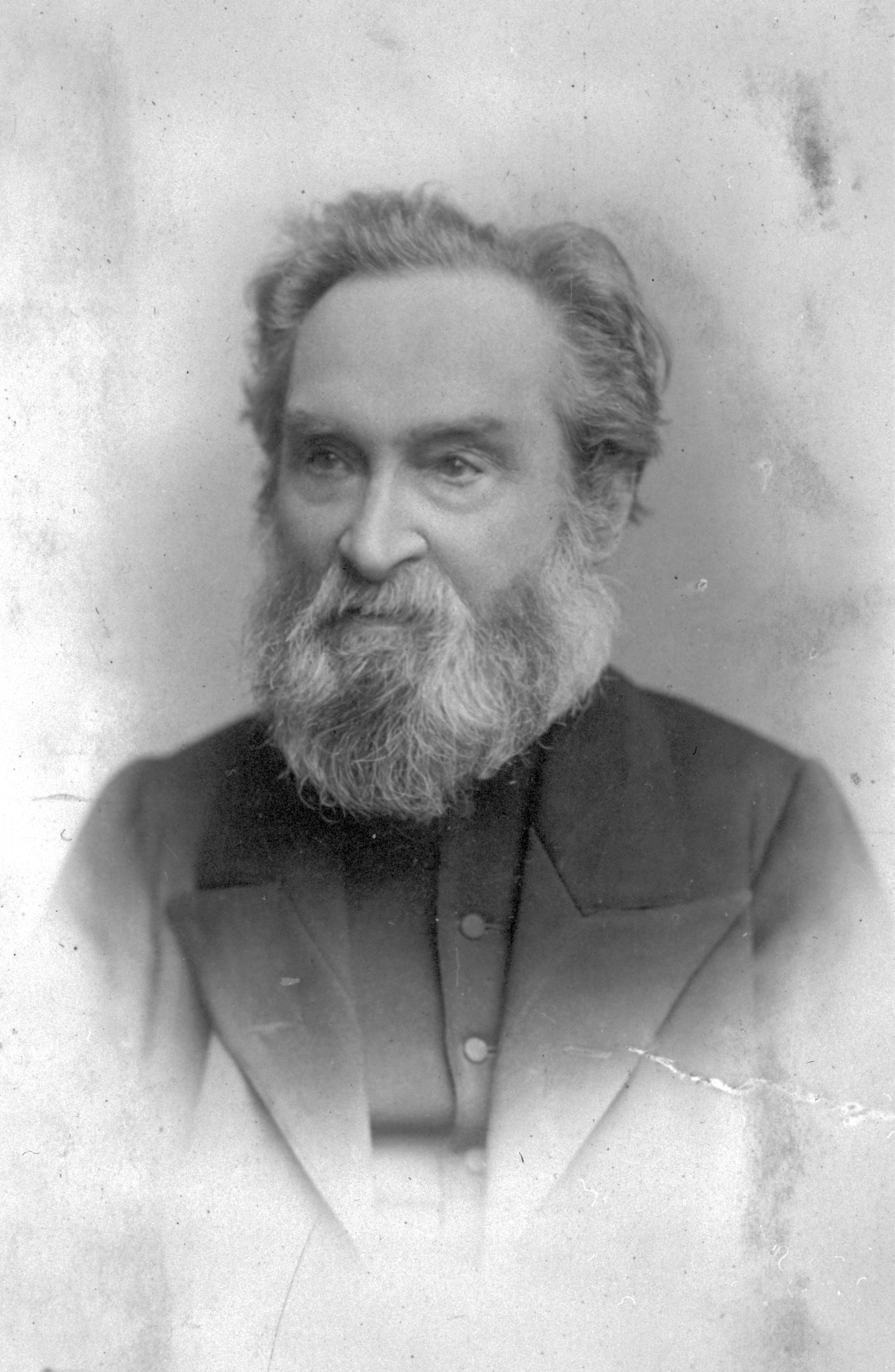
- Robert Terrill Rundle
- Born: 18 June 1811; Mylor, Cornwall, England
- Died: 4 February 1896 (aged 84); Garstang, Lancashire, England
- Spouse: Mary Wolverson
- Children: 9 (4 survived to adulthood)
- Parent(s): Robert Rundle Sr. and Grace Carvosso
- Church: Wesleyan Methodist
- Ordained: 8 March 1840
- Congregations served: Various throughout present-day Alberta and Saskatchewan, Canada; other circuits in England.
- Offices held: Methodist minister in Fort Edmonton

Robert Terrill Rundle (18 June 1811 – 4 February 1896) was a Cornish Methodist minister missionary from Cornwall, England. His most noteworthy activities relate to his missionary work in Western Canada between 1840 and 1848.

== Early life ==
Rundle was born in Mylor, Cornwall in 1811. As the grandson of the noted Methodist lay minister William Carvosso and nephew of Carvosso's prominent missionary son, Benjamin, religion, in particular Methodism, was an obvious influence on Rundle's life from early on. Rundle's father kept his family within the Church of England. This Anglican influence stayed with Robert even after he joined the Methodist church in later years, as he still relied on documents such as the Book of Common Prayer in his ministry.

Robert Rundle enrolled in a business school near Boscastle, Cornwall in 1837. Once describing himself as a "radical", he felt that he would, "be transformed into a Tory before long," by the influence of his instructors. While at Boscastle, Rundle took an interest in the Wesleyan Church affairs there. Eventually Rundle joined the Wesleyan Church in a more active role; he undertook several months of missionary training, and was ordained on 8 March 1840, in London after being approved for a missionary assignment in Rupert's Land.

== Travel to Rupert's Land ==
In 1840, the Hudson's Bay Company reached a deal with the Wesleyan Missionary Society that several Methodist missionaries would be dispatched to the western districts of Rupert's Land. This was spurred in part by pressure from Evangelical groups in England, as well as from a desire by the company to improve its public face by improving the standard of living in Rupert's Land. Ultimately, it was also meant to keep the British Government sympathetic to the HBC in case another party tried to stake a claim on Rupert's Land. The company's Governor in Rupert's Land, Sir George Simpson, wanted to avoid giving ground to the Roman Catholic missionaries, who were backed by the French Government and already had a presence in the eastern districts, and maintain the HBC's control over the west. Robert Rundle was among the four who were invited, and after only two months of training, he was ordained. Just over a week later on 16 March 1840, he shipped out from Liverpool.

When Rundle landed in New York City, he travelled first north to Montreal, and then started westward on his long journey across the expanse of Rupert's Land. He encountered natives during this travel, and quickly found that the apprehensions that he had had of meeting them contrasted with the delight he felt at being in their company. He arrived at Fort Edmonton, the center of the Hudson's Bay Company Saskatchewan District, in October 1840.

== Years in Saskatchewan ==
Rundle arrived in Fort Edmonton on 16 October 1840, after almost a month and a half travelling by river. He remained in the Saskatchewan District for eight years before his permanent departure.

=== Rundle's contemporaries ===
Several persons were crucial to Robert Rundle's missionary work and professional growth during his eight years in Rupert's Land. They are listed below.

Governor Sir George Simpson – Governor-in-Chief of Rupert's Land, Simpson was the head of the HBC's operations there. He met Rundle on at least one occasion in July 1841, and the two shared correspondence during Rundle's tenure at Edmonton. Privately, Simpson criticized Rundle's wanderings amongst the First Nations, and like his subordinate John Rowand, questioned Rundle's aptitude for missionary work. However, Simpson had worked tirelessly in service of the HBC and expected the same from those around him, and that his criticisms came very early in the then-inexperienced Rundle's career. Governor Simpson later professed support for a school in the area to be taught by Rundle with native children attending, but this did not materialize.

Chief Factor John Rowand – As Chief Factor of Saskatchewan, Rowand, who ran the District from Edmonton, was a reputed businessman and firm disciplinarian. Rowand expressed fear that conversion by missionaries would distract the natives from the trapping and trading of animal furs, which was vital to the company's operation. Nevertheless, he took a liking to Rundle early on, despite opinions that the missionary was too young for his charge and ill-suited to pioneer living. Rundle held a form of school and instructed those of Rowand's children who still dwelled in Edmonton. Rowand also provided one of his horses for Rundle's use, named 'Little Black'.

Chief Trader John Edward Harriott – As John Rowand's second-in-command, and also Rowand's son-in-law, Harriott was a valuable benefactor for Robert Rundle. He assisted Rundle in the translation of a prayer book to Cree language, and was known to have helped the mission's endeavours in various ways. He was the first person on record to be married by Rundle in the Saskatchewan District, having sanctified his wedding vows to John Rowand's daughter Nancy in 1841 (whereas he and Nancy had been engaged in a country marriage since the late 1830s).

Reverend James Evans – Evans was the supervisor of the Wesleyan missionaries in Rupert's Land. A linguist, Evans is credited with devising the syllabics, which constitutes a written language for the Cree and was subsequently taught by Rundle and others. Evans' removal to face trial for a sexual misconduct, and untimely death, in 1846, left Rundle and his Methodist colleagues unsupported.

Father Pierre-Jean De Smet – A fellow Missionary, De Smet acquainted Rundle in autumn of 1845 at Rocky Mountain House. Though De Smet was Catholic and Rundle was a Methodist Protestant, the two managed to debate theology in a cordial manner despite the sometimes-contentious divisions of the Christian schism. This is especially remarkable considering Rundle's personal wariness of Catholic missionaries.

=== Missionary work ===
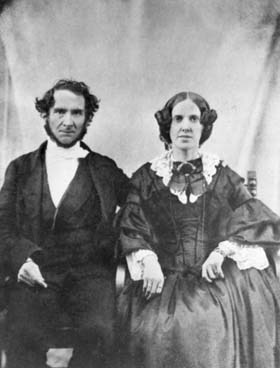
Robert Terrill Rundle and his wife Mary Wolverson ca. 1860

Initially optimistic about his work in the District, Rundle was slowly demoralized on several fronts. The religious denomination most prevalent in Fort Edmonton was Catholic, thus few people attended Rundle's Protestant services. Within the Fort, Rundle often attempted, with limited success, to teach the labourer's children about the gospel. He held services throughout the week, especially on the Christian Sabbath (Sunday), which would often include a Cree service. Rundle urged that no work be done in observance of the Sabbath and himself avoided travel on that day; in this, Rundle had John Rowand's support, but some of the workers were too used to their routines to pay the missionary any mind.

Rundle often wintered at the Fort, and visited with the natives through the spring and summer to preach the gospel and educate them in the Cree syllabics invented by his Wesleyan missionary colleague, Reverend James Evans. In this way, Rundle became extremely well-travelled, having gone the distance between the HBC's larger trading posts in what is present-day Alberta, and having sought out the natives who lived in the country along the way.

In 1843, the Hudson's Bay Company erected a small chapel which Rundle boasted could seat 100 people. Described by Rundle in a letter home, the structure served not only as a Chapel, but had a small lodging for Rundle including a study space.

=== Health issues ===
Possibly due to his constant and laborious travel, Robert Rundle was prone to recurrent headaches and a bleeding nose. Rundle persevered for eight years in Rupert's Land until he suffered a more serious injury from a horse-riding accident – a fractured wrist – in July 1847. Even after 12 months Rundle's injury did not heal properly, rendering his left hand essentially useless. Rundle decided to return home to seek treatment; he reached England in September 1848. While he had intended to go back to Rupert's Land, he never did again.

== Later years ==
=== Return to England ===
After regaining his health, Rundle was prepared to do missionary service abroad again. He was evidently offered a missionary post in Australia; however, his plans changed when he married a woman named Mary Wolverson in 1854, and he stayed in England. Robert and Mary had nine children, though only four of them survived to maturity: Martha Anne, Rupert, Mary Grace and Sarah Alice.

Rundle continued to serve as a minister in England until his retirement. He died on 4 February 1896, in Garstang, Lancashire. His epitaph is located in Blackburn, Lancashire, at the Whalley New Road Cemetery.

== Legacy ==
=== Rundle's Mission ===
In 1847, Reverend Rundle received permission to create a mission site at Pigeon Lake. After Rundle's permanent departure to England the following year, his follower Benjamin Sinclair attempted to keep the Methodist church alive. Sinclair oversaw the construction of mission buildings at the behest of Rundle in 1848, and was left in charge in the missionary's absence. The mission served the Cree, Stoney, and Blackfoot peoples, instructing them not only in Christianity, but in reading and writing in syllabics, and growing crops.

Unsupported, Sinclair abandoned the mission in 1851 and continued his work elsewhere; the structures were inhabited again by Rundle's Methodist successors, Rev. Thomas Woolsey and Henry Steinhauer from 1856 to 1858. Woolsey found the area was prone to a poor growing season to due a colder climate, had poor soil conditions, and due to a shrinking Bison population, there was violence amongst the native tribes in the area who relied on it for food. Thus, Woolsey eventually opened a new mission near Smoky Lake in 1861. Sinclair and Woolsey maintained Rundle's remaining followers, and the Methodist church in central Alberta survived and grew into the 20th century. Eventually the Methodists joined with the Presbyterians and Congregationalists to form the United Church of Canada in 1925.

Incidentally, Woolsey later married Rundle's sister-in-law, Sarah Wolverson.

The Rundle Mission site was declared a National Historic Monument in 1965, and the site, its buildings and cemetery were designated a Provincial Historic Site in 1997. Though the original buildings no longer survive, there is a retreat house present.

=== Journal and registries ===
Robert Rundle documented his work in Rupert's Land in his journals. Included in this are two sets of registers: one set documenting hundreds of baptisms and dozens of weddings all performed by Rev. Rundle. Each ledger typically notes the first and last names of the persons involved (including parents of children for the baptisms), the age of the child (for baptisms), the date of the ceremony, and the precise location when applicable (although occasionally he broadly refers to the location as "Saskatchewan District" when the ceremony was performed away from a Hudson's Bay Company post or body of water).

Additionally, Rundle kept an anecdotal record in his journal, shedding light on his experience as a missionary and a Christian, and on life within Hudson's Bay Company posts.

=== Things named in Rundle's honour ===
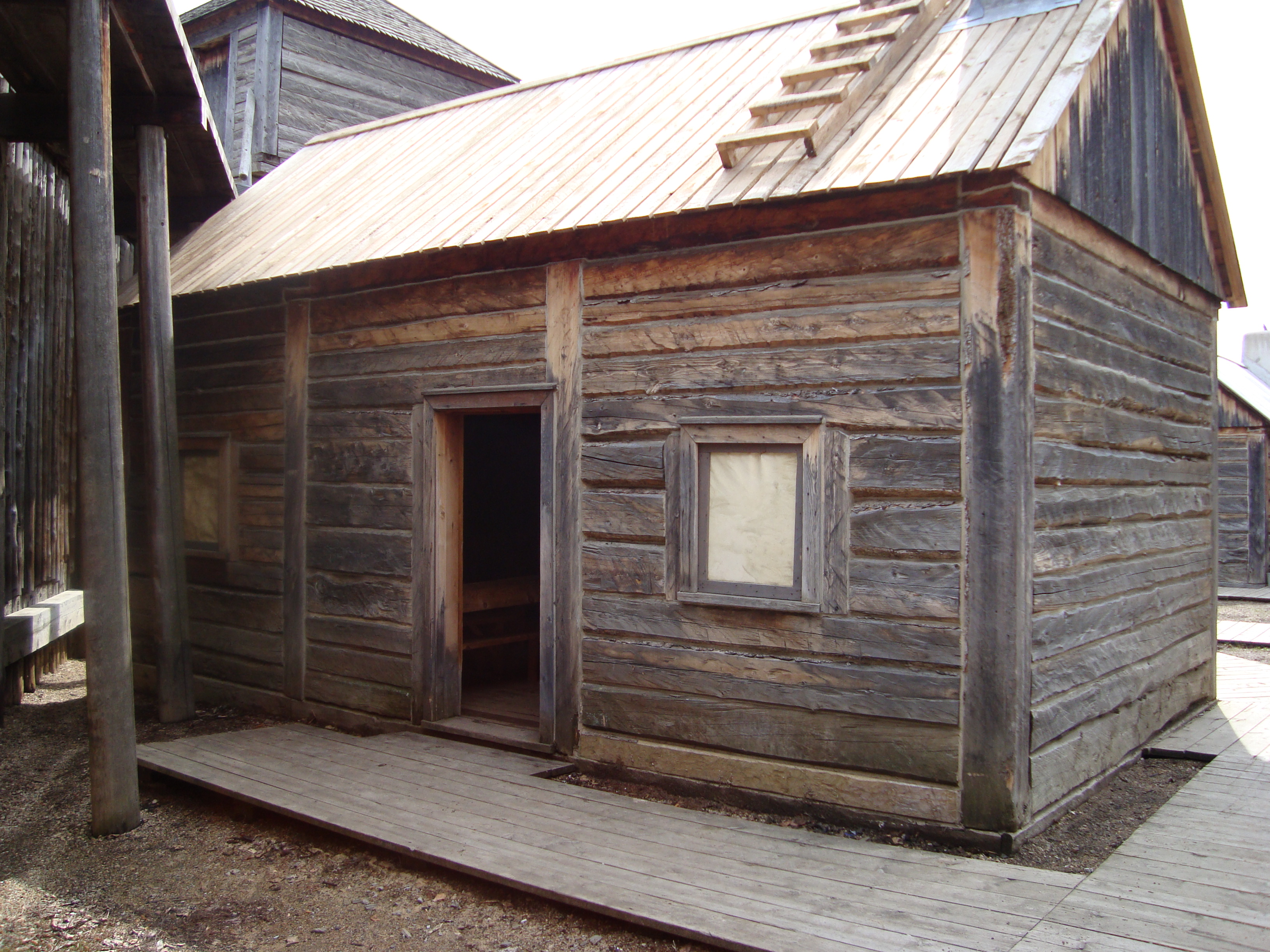
Exterior of Fort Edmonton Park's reconstruction of Rundle's chapel, c. 1846

- Mount Rundle, which overlooks Banff, Alberta, was named for the Reverend by John Palliser in 1858. Palliser was impressed that the Blackfoot in the area still showed signs of Rundle's influence despite the missionary's absence of over a decade.
- Rundle Memorial United Church in Banff
- The Rundle Heights neighborhood in east-central Edmonton.
- Rundle Park in Rundle Heights, a large outdoor recreation space beside the North Saskatchewan River in Edmonton.
- A residential subdivision called Rundle in Calgary, Alberta.
- The Rundle C-Train Station in Calgary.
- Several schools in Alberta:
  - Rundle School (elementary) in Edmonton.
  - Rundle Elementary School in Calgary.
  - Robert Rundle Elementary School in the suburb of St. Albert, Alberta.
  - Rundle College, a private, multi-campus school for pre-school to Grade 12 students in Calgary.
- Fort Edmonton Park includes a replica of the Fort of 1846 and a recreated version of the Rundle Chapel inside of it.
- Rundle Hall, a dormitory at the University of Calgary.
- The Rundle Plant, a hydroelectric plant on the Bow River in southern Alberta.
- Rundle's Mission Memorial Lodge
- Rundle Lounge at the Banff Fairmont Spring Hotel
- Various streets throughout Alberta.

== Bibliography ==
- Rundle, Robert Terril (1977). Hugh A. Dempsey (ed.). The Rundle Journals, 1840 – 1848. Introduction & Notes by Gerald M. Hutchinson. Glenbow Institute.

== Sources ==
- Wilson, Keith (1986). Robert Terrill Rundle. University of Manitoba. ISBN 0-9691775-3-4.
- The United Church of Canada (1940). Rundle in Alberta, 1840–1848: To Honour the Memory of a Pioneer.
