= John Peter Pruden =

Pioneer of western Canada, fur trader, and writer

- Born: 31 May 1778; Edmonton, Middlesex, England
- Died: 28 May 1868 (aged 89); Winnipeg, Manitoba, Canada
- Occupations: Hudson's Bay Co. fur-trader; Councillor of Assiniboia
- Spouse(s): 1. Patasegawisk, a.k.a. "Nancy"; 2. Ann Armstrong
- Children: Elizabeth, William, Charlotte, Peter, Maria, Cornelious, Arthur, James, John Peter, and Caroline
- Parent(s): Peter Pruden and Margaret Smith Fraser

John Peter Pruden (31 May 1778 (baptized) – 28 May 1868) was an early pioneer of western Canada which at the time was known as Rupert's Land. During his many years of employment as a fur-trader with the Hudson's Bay Company (HBC), he had extensive interactions with such First Nations as the Cree and Blackfoot. He was known to have spoken Cree fluently, a fact which was confirmed by HBC administrator Sir George Simpson in his famous but "sometimes erratic" 1832 Character Book.

Pruden was christened on 31 May 1778 at All Saints Parish Church in Edmonton, Middlesex, England. It is not known exactly how 13-year-old Pruden came to join the Hudson's Bay Company in 1791. It appears to be atypical amongst HBC "servants". It may have been through a possible link to Sir James Winter Lake, 3rd Baronet (c. 1745–1807), whose family controlled the Company during most of the 18th century, and whose estate at "The Firs" was near Tanner's End, near the junction of the New and Salmon Rivers, in Edmonton. No other boys from Edmonton appear to have been taken into the Company's service. Pruden's apprenticeship with the HBC was purchased for him through the good auspices of his (and Sir James Winter Lake's) local parish. Noted family historian Hal Pruden wrote: "The HBC took some of its eventual ships' captains from the Bluecoats charity school (Christ's Hospital) in London. (David Thompson was from the Greycoats school.) [There were] few boys recruited into the HBC as apprentice clerks out of the thousands of work houses (poor houses) that existed across England. […] The [one] pound sterling paid by the [Edmonton] parish [for his apprenticeship] would be about $3,000 US dollars today." Pruden appears to have been an impoverished orphan at the date of his entry as an employee of the Company, for his father, Peter Pruden, had died in 1790, followed some short months afterward by his mother, Margaret Smith Fraser Pruden.

Pruden's employment in the Hudson's Bay Company began in earnest in September 1791 when he arrived at York Factory by the Company's ship, Seahorse III, as a 13-year-old apprentice. He spent four years at York Factory. Four years later Pruden was an escort to James Curtis Bird who was being transferred to Carlton House, in the Saskatchewan District. He and Bird served in the Saskatchewan District under Inland Master William Tomison. In May 1796 Pruden moved to a post called Fort Edmonton or Edmonton House located at present-day Fort Saskatchewan, Alberta.

The name Edmonton was originally suggested by Pruden as it was the home of both the deputy governor of the HBC Sir James Winter Lake and his own former residence.

In 1798 Pruden was given the job of "writer" at Fort Edmonton.

He moved to Buckingham House in 1799 and returned to Edmonton House the next year. Upon arriving at Edmonton House, Pruden found that his old friend Bird had been given charge of the post. Bird sent Pruden to build a house (fur-trading post) between Edmonton House and Rocky Mountain House. This new fort was on the site of present-day Edmonton, (now the capital city of Alberta, Canada).

By 1832, John Peter Pruden had served 41 years with the HBC. By then he was chief factor (fort manager and boss). No Chief Factor serving at that time had more service years, and only three of the Chief Traders then serving went on to accumulate more.

One year after receiving his promotion to Chief Factor, Pruden, aged 59, retired and moved to the Red River Colony (or Selkirk Settlement) (now Winnipeg, Manitoba, Canada). He was appointed to the Council of Assiniboia in 1839. In 1844, he became a member of the Board of Public Works, being the executive committee of the Council of Assiniboia. He served on the quarterly court as part of his office and

In 1851, Eden Colvile, the Associate Governor of Rupertsland offered him an appointment as a magistrate. However by then 73 years old, Pruden declined, citing old age and ill health. However Pruden went on to live more than a decade longer in his retirement at Red River.

He died at Red River on 28 May 1868 after a lengthy illness, at the age of almost 90. He was laid to rest at St. John's Cathedral Churchyard, in the Red River Colony.

Pruden left behind a large family of children, grandchildren and great-grandchildren. His Métis (or mixed-blood) descendants frequently intermarried with children of other prominent Métis families. Pruden was also instrumental in furthering the fur trading career of his half-nephew, John Edward Harriott, with the Hudson Bay Company.

JPP's "country" wife of almost 30 years, "Patasegawisk", also known as "Nancy Pruden", (probably from the old site of Norway House, now called Oxford House), bore him many children. She predeceased him in August 1838.

His second wife, British schoolteacher Ann Armstrong, whom he married at Red River on 4 December 1839, was 49 years old at the time of their marriage. Their marriage was childless.

By his will, John Peter Pruden left several bequests to family members, including a bequest to Ann of a modest 250 English pounds and a further 30 pounds if she wished to return to England. By September, 1869, Ann returned to England. She died at Ore, near Hastings in Sussex, England in 1887.

== See also ==
- Métis people (Canada)
