= William Warre =

Lieutenant-General Sir William Warre CB
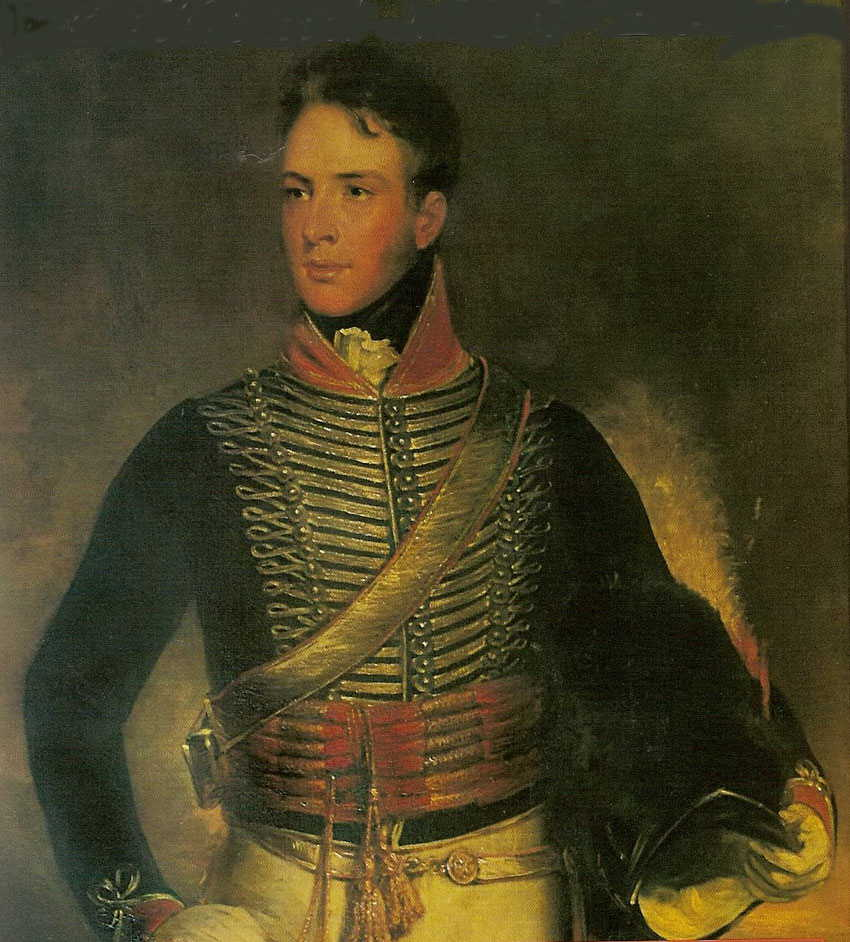
- Born: 15 April 1784; Porto, Portugal
- Died: 26 July 1853 (aged 69); York, Yorkshire, England
- Burial place: Bishopthorpe
- Spouse: Selina Anna Maling (m. 1812)
- Children: Sir Henry Warre
- Relatives: Edmond Warre (nephew)
- Military career
- Allegiance: Kingdom of Great Britain; British Empire; Kingdom of Portugal
- Branch: Army
- Rank: Lieutenant-General
- Conflicts: Peninsular War; War of the Two Brothers
- Awards: Order of the Bath; Order of the Tower and Sword; Order of Aviz

Lieutenant-General Sir William Warre, CB (15 April 1784 – 26 July 1853) was an English officer of the British Army. He saw service in the Peninsular War and was colonel of the 94th Foot.

== Early life and education ==
Warre was born in Porto, Portugal, the eldest son of wine merchant James Warre, a partner in Warre & Co., and his wife, Eleanor Greg, daughter of Thomas Greg of Belfast. The Warres had been settled in Porto for generations as exporters of the region's famed Port wine. The company is still operating as Warre's, and Sir William's portrait hangs in the city's famed Factory House.

He was educated at Harrow School, but apparently left early to return to Portugal and join the family business. The boy was placed in the office of his uncle, also named William Warre, to learn the trade. However, a mischievous prank, in which he used sealing wax to affix the ponytail of the Portuguese member of the firm to his desk, ended his career as a merchant. He was sent to Bonn to study with a private tutor.

His nephew Edmond Warre, who later published a collection of his letters, Letters from the Peninsula, 1808–1812, shared a story in the preface about his uncle's adventures in Bonn. He and another student decided to join the Austrians in their war against France and were promptly taken prisoner. They were brought before a French general who realised they were mere boys and English to boot. The French General told them they were lucky they were not brought before "The Iron Marshal" Louis-Nicolas Davout, "for he would have hanged you without mercy on the nearest tree. Now go back to your books and your tutor and don't meddle with affairs which do not concern you." Edmond places the story shortly before 1803 but identifies the French general as General Custine, who was briefly the commander of the Army of the North (28 May – 16 July 1793) before he was executed by guillotine, when William was not yet 10 years old.

== Career ==
On 5 November 1803, Warre was commissioned as an ensign in the 52nd Foot. He purchased a promotion to lieutenant on 2 June 1804, followed by a commission on 25 April 1806 in the 98th Foot. Four months later he exchanged into the 23rd Light Dragoons.

Warre attended Royal Military College, Sandhurst in the summer of 1807 and the following May was appointed aide-de-camp to Major-General Sir Ronald Craufurd Ferguson. A few months later, Warre returned to his native Portugal where he saw action at the battles of Roliça (17 August) and Vimeiro (21 August) before falling ill with dysentery. He was sent to recover in Lisbon, where Major-General William Carr Beresford welcomed him into his house. After his recovery, Beresford installed Warre in his staff and he served throughout Sir John Moore's campaign, ending with the Battle of Coruña in January 1809.

When Beresford was appointed Commander in Chief of the Portuguese Army in March 1809, Warre was appointed his first aide-de-camp and promoted to Major. Warre took part in all the operations of Beresford's division in 1809–10, including the Crossing of the Douro and the capture of Porto as Arthur Wellesley.

However, he fell ill with rheumatic fever during the retreat to the lines of Torres Vedras in September 1810, forcing him to return to England to recuperate. He rejoined Beresford in May 1811 after the Battle of Albuera, and took part in the Second Siege of Badajoz in May and June.

He was promoted to be brevet major in the British Army in 1811, and lieutenant-colonel in the Anglo-Portuguese Army on 3 July. He was at the Siege of Ciudad Rodrigo in January 1812, at the third siege and capture of Badajoz in April, and at the battle of Salamanca on 22 July, where Beresford was wounded.

Warre served as deputy quartermaster-general at the Cape of Good Hope from 1813–21. In 1823, he was appointed a permanent assistant quartermasters-general, and served in Dublin until 1826, when he was transferred to Portsmouth. In December 1826, he was appointed assistant quartermaster-general under Lieutenant-General Sir William Henry Clinton. He was sent back to Portugal, where he stayed until 1828, to support the Portuguese against Spain in the War of the Two Brothers.

Warre was promoted to colonel in 1830. Two years later, he was transferred from Portsmouth to Cork as permanent assistant quartermaster-general, and in 1835 returned to Dublin. He served as commandant of the garrison at Chatham, Kent from 1837–41, after which he promoted to major-general. In 1847, he appointed colonel of the 94th Foot and promoted again to lieutenant-general in November 1851.

== Honours ==
For Warre's service in the Peninsular War, he received the medal and six clasps from the British Army. For his many years of service in Portugal in the Peninsular War and War of the Two Brothers, he was knighted in the Order of the Tower and Sword by Queen Maria II of Portugal. He was also a Commander of the Order of Aviz by the Portuguese.

He was appointed a Companion of the Order of the Bath (CB) in the 1838 Coronation Honours of Queen Victoria, and was knighted the following year.

== Personal life ==
On 19 November 1812, he married Selina Anna Maling, the youngest daughter of Christopher Thompson Maling. They had two daughters and four sons:

- William James Warre (October 1813 – 11 January 1815), died in childhood
- Capt. Thomas Maling Warre (20 October 1814 – 15 September 1851) of the East India Company
- Lieut. John Frederick Warre (27 November 1815 – 3 July 1847) of the Royal Navy, died while serving in China
- Selina Eleanor Warre (January – 3 September 1817), died in childhood
- Sir Henry James Warre (1819–1898)
- Julia Sophia Warre (1820–1873), died unmarried

His wife's elder sister Sophia married Henry Phipps, 1st Earl of Mulgrave, and was the mother of Constantine Phipps, 1st Marquess of Normanby.

He died in York in 1853 and was buried at Bishopthorpe.

== Bibliography ==
- Warre, Sir William (1909). Warre, Edmond (ed.). Letters from the Peninsula, 1808–1812. London: J. Murray. ISBN 978-1-103-05017-8.
