= William J. Christie =

Canadian politician

William Joseph Christie (1824–1899) was an early Canadian politician and prominent Hudson's Bay Company employee. He served as a Councilor on the Temporary North-West Council from 1872 to 1873.

== Hudson's Bay Company career ==
Christie served a long career with the Hudson's Bay Company. His career gave him a special relationship with native populations in the territories. The Cree in particular consulted him about their concerns over the lack of Canadian government representatives and rumors of armed hostilities against the natives.

Christie was a Métis who spoke French and English and possibly Cree. In 1862 Father Émile Petitot met Christie at Portage La Loche. He quotes William Joseph Christie then the chief factor of Fort Edmonton as saying in perfect French "I am myself a Metis. By George! We are almost all Métis in the Company. Among the chief factors there is not a single Englishman, and maybe not ten Scots with pure blood."(translation)

== Politics ==
Christie was appointed to the Temporary North-West Council, the first government for the Northwest Territories on December 28, 1872. His appointment was short lived as he resigned from the council less than a year later.

Christie served as commissioner for the Fort Qu'Appelle negotiation of Treaty 4 in 1874, as well as for the Treaty 6 negotiations Fort Carlton and Fort Pitt in 1876.

In May 1875 the Canadian Pacific Railway leased Christie's home in Selkirk, Manitoba to use as a telegraph office.

His grand daughter Edith Rogers served as a MLA in the Manitoba Legislature.

== Legacy ==
Mount Christie in Jasper National Park in the Canadian Rockies was named for him by James Hector in 1859.
