= Mervin Vavasour =

- Born: 1821
- Died: 27 March 1866 (aged 44–45)
- Occupation: member of Royal Engineers

Mervin Vavasour (1821 – 27 March 1866) was a member of the Royal Engineers, one of the corps of the British Army.

== Early life ==
He was probably born at Fort George, Upper Canada, in 1821, to Captain Henry William Vavasour of the Royal Engineers and Louisa Dunbar, daughter of Sir George Dunbar. He enrolled in the Royal Military Academy in Woolwich, England, in February 1837, and was commissioned a second lieutenant in the Royal Engineers on 19 March 1839. He was eventually sent to Montreal, arriving on 18 September 1841. In 1842, he was promoted to lieutenant.

== Oregon mission ==
In 1845–46, during the Oregon Boundary Dispute, Lieutenants Vavasour, and Henry Warre were dispatched on a mission to evaluate the logistics of a military campaign in the Columbia District (known then to Americans as the Oregon Country). This was done in response to a territorial dispute generally known as the Oregon Question, and the stated policy of President of the United States James K. Polk to expand into and control those territories along the west coast of North America, much of which the British contested as belonging to them. Vavasour and Warre travelled in the guise of civilians “for the pleasure of field sports and scientific pursuits,” through territory controlled by the Hudson's Bay Company (HBC), confidentially evaluating the strategic value of both the land and the HBC's facilities. This information made its way back to London in 1846.

HBC officer Peter Skene Ogden traveled with the British officers and held a low opinion of Vavasour. In a letter written in April 1846 to Governor George Simpson, Odgen complained that Vavasour was "to the last hour a disagreeable Puppy and at times most disgusting particularly when under the influence of Brandy and Opium."

Fort Victoria Plan	Fort Edmonton Plan

Despite the rhetoric neither Britain nor the United States wanted a third war in 70 years; and a war over the Oregon Country was averted by diplomacy when Britain gave up all claims to lands in the lower Columbia Basin and Puget Sound. Vavasour's report concluded that the British Army, if deployed in the region, would be faced with substantial obstacles. These included: their poor evaluation of the readiness of the HBC forts and other facilities for military uses, the significant number of American settlers crossing into the territory via the well established Oregon Trail, and the considerable obstacles posed by the Rocky Mountains to British supply lines.

== Later career ==
Vavasour sailed to England in October 1846, and served in the British Isles, being promoted to 2nd captain in 1849. He was later posted to the West Indies from 1851 to 1852. He went on half-pay in 1853.

== Legacy ==
Vavasour published his notes and the images drawn by Warre in Sketches in North America and the Oregon Territory (1849). From this comes some of the earliest European artistic renderings of the Rocky Mountains and also valuable records such as an 1846 plan diagram of Fort Edmonton to scale. This plan influenced the reconstruction of the fort as Fort Edmonton Park, Edmonton, Alberta, Canada, in the 1960s.

Mount Vavasour in Alberta was named for Vavasour in 1918; it is south of Mount Warre, named for Warre.

Vavasour Street, in Savona, British Columbia, Canada, is named after Mervin Vavasour as well.
