= John Rowand =

Canadian politician

John Rowand (c. 1787 – 30 May 1854) was a fur trader for the North West Company and later, the Hudson's Bay Company. At the peak of his career, he was Chief Factor at Fort Edmonton, and in charge of the HBC's vast Saskatchewan District.

== Early life ==
=== Montreal ===
John Rowand was the son of Dr. John Rowand, a surgeon in Montreal. Though possessing only an elementary education, Rowand joined the firm McTavish, Frobisher and Company at sixteen years. The firm's head, Simon McTavish, was the leading share-holder in the North West Company.

=== North West Company clerk ===
1803 saw Rowand posted to Fort Augustus, the NWC companion to the Hudson's Bay Company's Edmonton House (then name for Fort Edmonton), as an apprentice clerk. Apart from his regular duties there, Rowand participated in hunting bison and indulged in another of his most notable pastimes through the years: horse-riding. Over the next few years, Rowand was positioned either at Fort Augustus or another of the nearby NWC posts.

Rowand suffered a broken leg from a riding accident in 1810. He was rescued by Louise (Lisette) Umfreville (daughter of Edward Umfreville), a Metis woman who nursed him back to health. Subsequently, John Rowand engaged Louise in a country marriage, and received a herd of horses as a dowry. According to some traditions, Rowand also adopted several of Louise's children by another man. John and Louise had at least five children together. In 1838 when Catholic priests passed through Fort Edmonton John and Louise did not get their marriage solemnized, but after living together almost 30 years they seem to not have felt the need for external affirmation of their relationship. Rowand described Louise as "my old friend the mother of all my children" and remain connected with her until her death in 1849.

=== Joining the Hudson's Bay Company ===
The Battle of Seven Oaks in 1816 threatened a further escalation of violence between North West Company and Hudson's Bay Company servants. Meanwhile, in the aftermath of the battle, the NWC lost several of its investors who were wary of the company's continued existence. In a move brokered to end hostilities between the companies, shareholders in the NWC agreed to merge with the Hudson's Bay Company, signing an agreement in 1821 that saw its name dissolved and its employees & properties absorbed under the HBC name. The agreement named several persons as chief factors and chief traders at this time; with Fort Augustus consequently being absorbed by Fort Edmonton, John Rowand was made a chief trader at Edmonton.

== Chief factor at Fort Edmonton ==
In 1823, Rowand started his first of three appointments, totalling nearly 17 years, as the chief factor at Fort Edmonton, making him answerable only to Governor Simpson or the HBC's London committee. Rowand's fort was positioned on one of the best means of transportation across the continent at the time: the North Saskatchewan River. In the early years of Rowand's administration, overland routes to northern posts such as Fort Assiniboine were made, and Edmonton became a central hub for furs to be shipped.

The fort, then in its fourth iteration, was located on a volatile flood plain, and Rowand oversaw the moving of the fort to higher ground a short distance west, to its fifth and final location, by 1830. On this new site, which is now home to the Alberta Legislature Building, he had a massive house constructed for his own use along the fort's courtyard. The house was known as "Rowand's Folly" for its extravagance; it is reputed to have been the first house to have glass windows in the west.

=== Relations with workers ===
Rowand was regarded as something of an ill-tempered taskmaster by the workers under him. Noted Rowand on the subject, "When they misbehave I will tell them of it without fearing to hurt their feelings – they must do their duty as I was made to do mine." Rowand's high expectations of the workers also showed in his little sympathy for illness; Father Albert Lacombe came upriver with a boat brigade with Rowand in 1852, and recalled that when he tried to convince Rowand that one of the labourers was ill and needed rest, Rowand responded, "Any man who is not dead after three days sickness is not sick at all."

Rowand's various abuses against the workers earned their ire, but it was an unfair Hudson's Bay Company practice that put a mutiny over the top in 1851. The issue that drove the work stoppage was that labourers were required to pay for work horses; horses were drawn randomly from lots and cost the same regardless of their condition. The men were only permitted to do the company's work with the horses. If the horse died, which was common, the man would have to pay for a new one. In response to the work stoppage, the company agreed to provide horses for free, but according to labourer William Gladstone, the men made a further demand that John Rowand provide each man a quart of rum in a stirrup cup. Rowand capitulated, but as per Gladstone's account, only after presenting himself in a dramatic fashion to them, fearless and defiant, to be struck dead by the mutineers, though the revolting workers told him that that was not their intent at all.

Some workers were in the habit of calling John Rowand by a nickname, "One-Pound-One". This was from the shuffle-step-shuffle sound made when Rowand walked, owing to the broken leg he had suffered earlier in his career.

=== Relations with First Nations ===
Rowand prided himself as a fair trader, writing of himself, "No one will say that I ever spoilt Indians. [...] I give them due but they must do their duty." Rowand was bold in his dealings, evidently bold enough to raise his voice to native chiefs in their own camps when surrounded by their warriors. This spirit is captured in a 1947 painting by Henry Simpkins (seen here ) that was used for an HBC calendar; the painting shows Rowand (stylistically slimmer) standing up to a mounted Blackfoot attack on the plains. According to the accompanying story, the chief recognized Rowand, apologized, and turned away.

Impressed by Rowand, the natives referred to him as "Big Mountain" or "Iron Shirt". Rowand's term as chief factor saw greater fur returns than before.

=== Family ===
Although John never had his marriage to Louise solemnized he had his four daughters baptized by the Catholic priests. Also when his daughter Nancy Rowand married John Edward Harriott it was a marriage performed by a Catholic priest with John Rowand serving as the lead witness.

== Death ==
In spring of 1854, Rowand joined the boat brigades which annually carried furs to Hudson Bay where they would be loaded onto ships and commence their voyage to England. Rowand would stop at Norway House as usual to attend the Council of the Northern Department, but he did not make it this far. On May 31, while at Fort Pitt - a post commanded by his son John - Rowand was about to intervene into a dispute between two tripmen, when he clutched his chest and fell suddenly dead.

Initially buried at Fort Pitt, Rowand's remains were exhumed. George Simpson explained in a letter to Rowand's son Alexander, "It was one of the last instructions your father gave John [Alexander's brother], on the day preceding his death, that his bones were not to be left in the Indian Country but removed to Canada and interred near those of his own father." The intended burial place was Montreal, but lacking means to preserve Rowand's body for a journey of so many weeks, his cadaver was boiled down to the bones. Ripley's states that his remains were "pickled" in a keg of rum and shipped overland. Simpson took the bones in a package to Red River, but from fear that superstitious boatmen might try to dispose of it on the longer journey to Montreal, he had them repackaged and shipped to England via York Factory instead, where they could then be shipped again to Montreal. In a course of years, Rowand was buried at Mount Royal Cemetery with a sizeable monument.

== In popular culture ==
Edmonton musician Cadence Weapon recorded a timpani-based dance music song about Rowand titled "One Pound One".

== Sources ==
- Goyette, Linda; Carolina Jakeway Roemmich (2004). Edmonton: In Our Own Words. Edmonton, AB: University of Alberta Press. ISBN 0-88864-449-3.
