= Thomas Woolsey =

American neuroscientist (born 1943)

Thomas Allen Woolsey (born 17 April 1943) is an American neuroscientist, currently George H. and Ethel R. Bishop Scholar in Neuroscience at Washington University School of Medicine.

He was born in Baltimore, studied for his B.S. at the University of Wisconsin (awarded 1965) and was awarded Doctor of Medicine at Johns Hopkins University in 1969.

He was assistant professor of anatomy (and later also neurobiology) at Washington University in St. Louis from 1971 to 1977, becoming an associate professor from 1977 to 1983, and professor of neurology and neurological surgery since 1984.
