= Edward Umfreville =

- Born: c. 1755
- Occupations: Fur trader, explorer, writer
- Years active: 1771–1789

Edward Umfreville (c. 1755 – fl. 1771–1789) was a fur trader, explorer, and writer. He moved to Canada in 1771 to work as a writer for the Hudson's Bay Company.

== Background ==
Umfreville went to York Factory and almost immediately was transferred to Fort Severn. There, he and Andrew Graham designed a comprehensive plan listing long term requirements for the inland posts that the company proposed to establish. While at Fort Severn in 1774, Umfreville assisted Samuel Hearne with the requirements for a proposed post at Cumberland House, Saskatchewan.

In 1775, Umfreville was transferred back to York Factory where he became second in command until 1782 when the fort was captured by the French led by Jean-François de Galaup. The personnel and the staff of the fort were sent back to France as prisoners.

The Treaty of Paris in 1783 freed Umfreville and he arrived in London. Disputes between him and the HBC ended his tenure there and he left for Quebec. By May 1784, he was employed by the North West Company to search for an alternate canoe route from Lake Superior to Lake Winnipeg, since the usual route along the Grand Portage and Pigeon River had come under American control. Travelling up the Nipigon River and then west from Lake Nipigon, Umfreville found an intricate route via the Wabinosh River, Sturgeon Lake, Lac Seul, and the English River to its mouth at the Winnipeg River. Although Umfreville succeeded, the Nor’Westers continued to use the route via the Grand Portage since the Americans were not enforcing their rights under the Treaty of Paris.

In 1784, Umfreville was in Saskatchewan at a fort near Frenchman Butte and, although in the employ of the NWC, advising the HBC to pursue inland forts such as those the Nor’Westers were operating out of Fort Kaministiquia. In 1788 he quit the NWC and tried to re-sign with the Hudson's Bay Company. This was unsuccessful and the publishing of his book, The present state of Hudson’s Bay . . . in 1790 was widely critical of the company. His whereabouts from this point in time are unknown.

The book's ill nature reflected the author's disappointment over not obtaining a command at the HBC but also did provide knowledge of parts of Canada that was lacking at that point in time.

== Works ==
- Umfreville, Edward (1790). The Present State of Hudson's Bay. FB&C Limited. ISBN 978-0282550073. OCLC 1050794983.
- Umfreville, Edward (1929) [1784]. Robert, Douglas (ed.). Nipigon to Winnipeg : a canoe voyage through western Ontario. Ottawa.
