= John Edward Harriott =

Canadian fur trader

John Edward Harriott (c. 1797 – 7 February 1866) was a fur trader who worked for the Hudson's Bay Company.

A Londoner who entered the trade at age 17, Harriott was a dedicated and prosperous worker. He climbed through the ranks of the Hudson's Bay Company to become a chief factor for the Saskatchewan District. He retired in 1855 after a career of nearly four decades.

While a fur trader, Harriott entered into two marriages, both with daughters of HBC fur-traders by Native American or Métis wives. His first wife, Elizabeth Pruden, was the daughter of John Peter Pruden, who was a Chief Trader and in 1836 was commissioned a Chief Factor. Although the marriage was not conducted by clergy when Harriott married Elizabeth he made a solemn promise to live with her as his wife until her death. Later when Harriott married Nancy Rowand, the daughter of John Rowand and his half-French-Canadian, half-Cree wife Louise Unfreville, the marriage was performed by a Catholic priest.
