= Henry Warre =

British general

Lieutenant-General Sir Henry Warre KCB
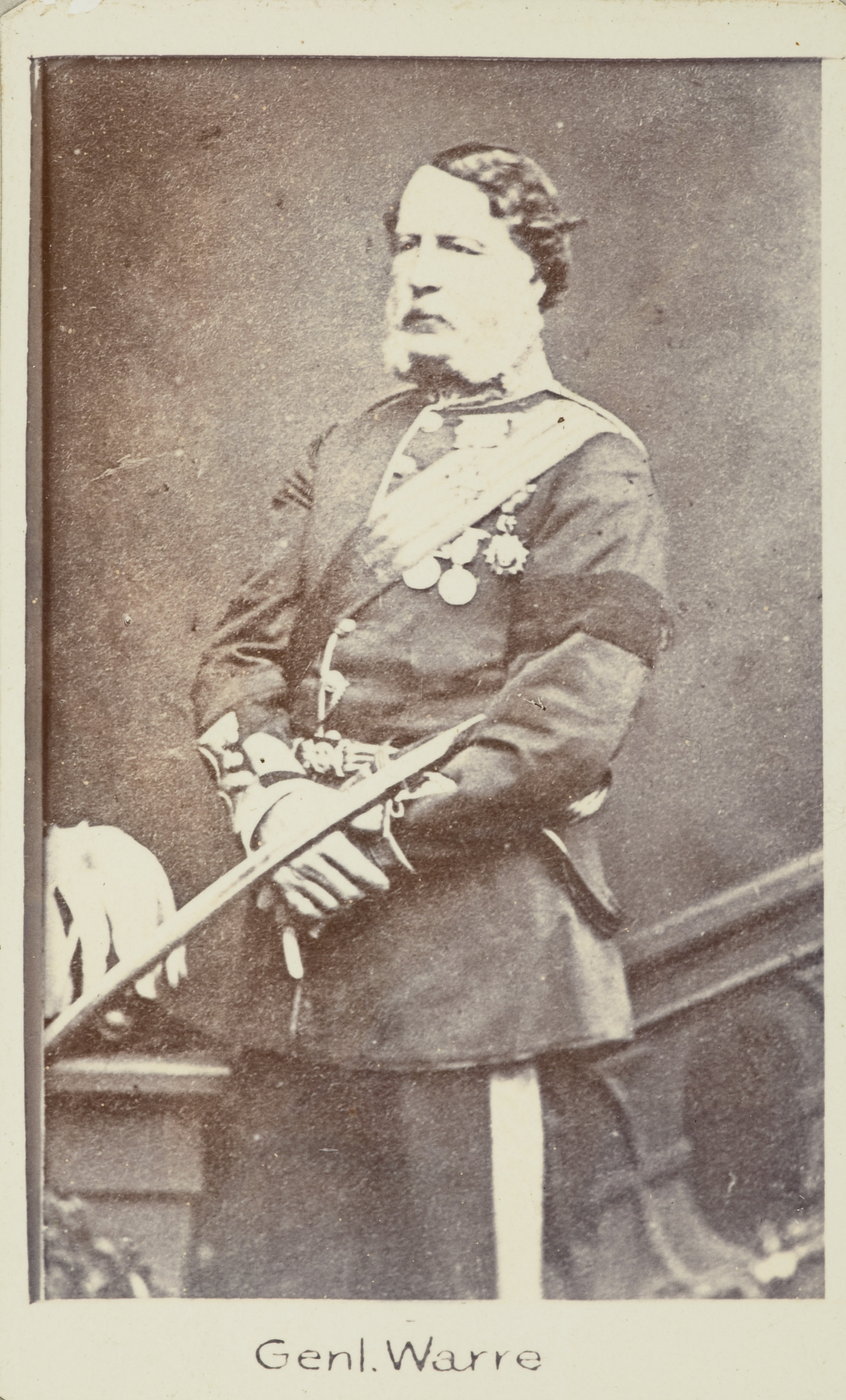
- Warre in c. 1860
- Born: Henry James Warre; 12 January 1819; Cape Town, Cape Colony
- Died: 3 April 1898 (aged 79); London, England
- Military career
- Allegiance: United Kingdom
- Branch: British Army
- Service years: 1837–1881
- Rank: Lieutenant-General
- Commands: Bombay Army
- Conflicts: Crimean War; New Zealand Wars; Second Taranaki War; Second Anglo-Afghan War
- Awards: Knight Commander of the Order of the Bath

Lieutenant-General Sir Henry James Warre KCB (12 January 1819 – 3 April 1898) was a British Army officer.

== Early life ==
Warre was born in Cape Town, Cape Colony, the son of Lieutenant-General Sir William Warre (1784–1853) and Selina Anna Maling, the youngest daughter of Christopher Thompson Maling. His father saw service in the Peninsular War as aide-de-camp to William Beresford, 1st Viscount Beresford. His mother's elder sister Sophia married Henry Phipps, 1st Earl of Mulgrave, and was the mother of Constantine Phipps, 1st Marquess of Normanby.

He was baptised on his first birthday at St Nicholas Church, Brighton, Sussex.

== Military career ==
Educated at the Royal Military College, Sandhurst, Warre was commissioned into the 54th Regiment of Foot in 1837. He became aide-de-camp to Sir Richard Downes Jackson, Commander-in-Chief of the Forces in British North America in 1839. A staff appointment in Canada led to his official investigation of the river route from Montreal to the Red River Settlement, which he traversed by canoe a distance of 2,300 miles.

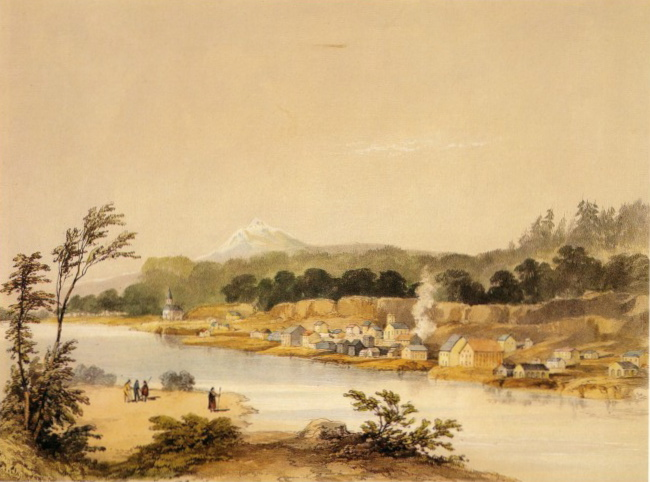
Warre's Oregon City 1845

Subsequently, in 1845 he was sent on a military reconnaissance mission, riding through the Rockies, with Mervin Vavasour to the Oregon Country to prepare for a potential Anglo-American war over the territory. During the trip he made paintings and sketches of the region, and reported on possible military preparations.

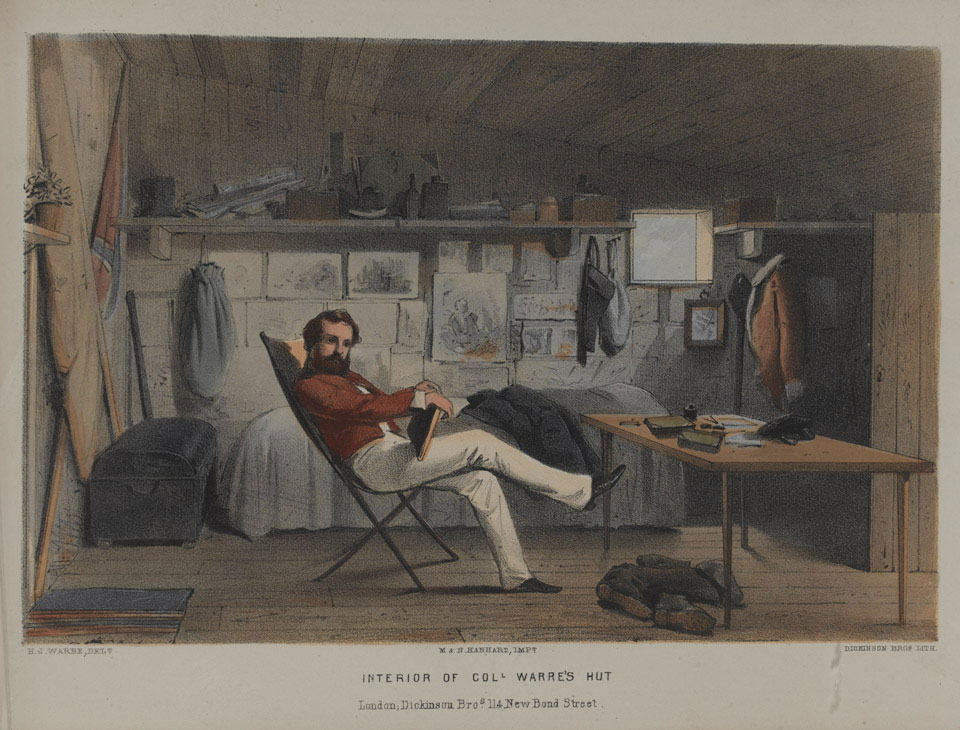
A self portrait, his hut in the Crimea, before Sebastopol, July 1855.

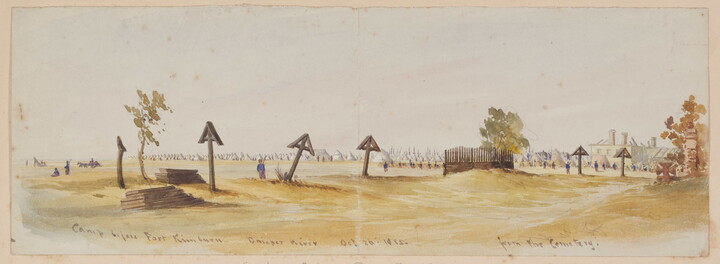
Camp before Fort Kinburn, Dnieper River, from the Cemetery - 26 October 1855. 9 days after the battle.

He served throughout the Crimean War, October 1853 to February 1856. Warre commanded the 57th Regiment of Foot in the Crimean War in 1855.

Taking part in the Siege of Sebastopol, he did his part in the quelling of the Indian Mutiny. He then transferred from India to take part in the Māori war of 1861 to 1865. He led his regiment in the Second Taranaki War in New Zealand in Spring 1865, seizing Māori land on the north Taranaki coast and establishing posts from Pukearuhe, 50 km north of New Plymouth, to Ōpunake, 80 km south of the town.

He became Commander-in-Chief of the Bombay Army in 1878 and served in that role during the Second Anglo-Afghan War, going to the support of Sir Donald Stewart, holding the line of march from the Indus to Kandahar, enabled him to relieve Kabul. He retired in 1881. He was awarded the K.C.B. on 29 May 1886.

Warre was also a talented artist and published two books of sketches from his journeys: Sketches in North America and the Oregon Territory (1848) and Sketches in the Crimea (1856).

The National Library of New Zealand has an extensive collection of 149 of his sketches covering the Crimean War, Europe, the United States, New Zealand, and some European items.

Military offices
| Preceded by Sir Charles Staveley | C-in-C, Bombay Army; 1878–1881 | Succeeded by Sir Arthur Hardinge |
