= Eikon =

Financial software

Eikon is a set of software products set to be fully replaced by LSEG Workspace in 2025. It is designed for financial professionals to monitor and analyse financial information. It provides access to real time market data, news, fundamental data, analytics, trading and messaging tools. It provides data on asset classes including foreign exchange, money markets, fixed income, equities, commodities, funds, and real estate.

Eikon will be replaced by 30 June 2025, by LSEG Workspace. LSEG Workspace has features that are part of London Stock Exchange Group (LSEG) multi-year partnership with Microsoft

== History ==
Thomson Reuters launched Eikon in 2010 as a replacement for Reuters 3000 Xtra, Reuters' earlier platform. At the end of 2013, an Eikon subscription was reported to cost from $300 to $1,800 per month, the average setup being around $800 per month. In October 2018 Eikon was transferred to Refinitiv as a result of a larger deal between Blackstone and the Financial & Risk business of Thomson Reuters. In October 2019, Blackstone and Thomson Reuters announced the sale of the company to London Stock Exchange Group. LSEG completed the US$27 billion purchase from the two previous owners in late January 2021, and Refinitiv is now a subsidiary of LSEG.

Under pressure from the Government of China, Refinitiv censored over 200 stories by Reuters covering the 2019–20 Hong Kong protests, removing them from its Eikon platform for consumers in mainland China. The company developed a "Strategic China filter" to block politically sensitive stories from readers in mainland China.

== Platforms ==
Eikon includes a desktop client, mobile app and a Web interface, as well as APIs for programmatic access. The Eikon interface is customizable by the user. The main desktop client runs on Microsoft Windows and lets users compose customized views on multiple screens. Refinitiv also provides data retrieval add-ons for Microsoft Office.

Eikon provides access to real-time Tradeweb data for 20 fixed income and derivatives asset classes, including government bond markets, alongside market-related news from Reuters and other sources.
