= Information Holdings Inc. =

- Industry: Information
- Founded: 1996; 29 years ago
- Defunct: 2004
- Fate: Merged with The Thomson Corporation
- Headquarters: Stamford, Connecticut, United States
- Key people: Mason Slained (former President & CEO)
- Revenue: $81 million (2003)

Information Holdings Inc. was a company based in Stamford, Connecticut, and listed (as "IHI") on the NYSE until its merger with The Thomson Corporation in November 2004. Stockholders received $28 per share in the $426 million cash merger. Its 2003 revenues were approximately $81 million.

Mason Slaine, president and chief executive officer of IHI, reportedly welcomed the merger.

Press releases indicated that IHI's activities, including brand names Micropatent, Aureka, MDC, and Liquent, would integrate seamlessly with Thomson Scientific & Healthcare's other businesses in areas of intellectual property and drug development workflow solutions.
