= BIOSIS Previews =

Bibliographic database for life sciences

- Producer: Clarivate Analytics (Canada and Hong Kong)

Access
- Providers: Web of Science

Coverage
- Disciplines: Science
- Record depth: Abstract & citation indexing

Links
- Website: wokinfo.com/products_tools/specialized/bp/
- Title list(s): ip-science.thomsonreuters.com/cgi-bin/jrnlst/jlresults.cgi?PC=BP

BIOSIS Previews is an English-language, bibliographic database service, with abstracts and citation indexing. It is part of Clarivate Analytics Web of Science suite. BIOSIS Previews indexes data from 1926 to the present.

BIOSIS Previews is part of the Life Sciences in Web of Science. Its coverage encompasses the life sciences and biomedical sciences literature, with deep global coverage on a wide range of related subject areas. This is accomplished with access to indexed journal content from Biological Abstracts, and supplemental indexed non-journal content from Biological Abstracts/Reports, Reviews, Meetings (BA/RRM or Biological Abstracts/RRM) and the major publications of BIOSIS. This coverage includes literature in pre-clinical and experimental research, methods and instrumentation, animal studies, environmental and consumer issues, and other areas.

The database is also provided by EBSCO Information Services through a partnership with Clarivate Analytics.

Biological Abstracts consists of 350,000 references for almost 5,000 primary journal and monograph titles. Biological Abstracts/RRM additionally includes more than 200,000 non-journal citations.

Biological Abstracts/RRM is the former BioResearch Index.

== Overview ==
Acceptable content for Web of Science and BIOSIS previews is determined by an evaluation and selection process based on the following criteria: impact, influence, timeliness, peer review, and geographic representation.

BIOSIS Previews covers 5,000 peer-reviewed journals. Non-journal coverage includes coverage of meetings, meeting abstracts, conferences, literature reviews, U.S. patents, books, software, book chapters, notes, letters, and selected reports in relevant disciplines including botany, microbiology, and pharmacology. BIOSIS Previews contains more than 18 million records; more than 500,000 records are added each year, and backfiles are available from 1926 to present. Specialized indexing has also been developed, which has increased the accuracy of retrieval. Taxonomic data and terms, enhanced disease terms, sequenced databank numbers, and a conceptually controlled vocabulary go back to 1969.

Some U.S. patents are also part of the BIOSIS Previews archives from 1926 to 1968, from 1986 to 1989, and from 1994 to present. Archived data is the electronic formatted content of the print Biological Abstracts volumes 1-49.

=== Print counterparts ===
The print counterparts for this bibliographic index were:

- Biological Abstracts
- Biological Abstracts/RRM
- BioResearch Index

== Topic coverage ==
The subject areas covered in BIOSIS Previews are broad and interdisciplinary. Content is available from all life sciences disciplines. This includes traditional biology (e.g. botany, ecology, zoology) and interdisciplinary subjects (e.g. biochemistry, biomedicine, biotechnology). Select literature from the Earth & Geological Sciences is also indexed.

== History ==
In 1926, the Society of American Bacteriologists and the Botanical Society of America, acknowledging the need for greater integration of life science information, agreed to merge their two publications, Abstracts of Bacteriology and Botanical Abstracts, thus creating Biological Abstracts. A not-for-profit company was formed to administer the publication on a financially sound basis. In 1964, the company's name was changed to BioSciences Information Service of Biological Abstracts (BIOSIS). In addition to its indexing and abstracting service, it published The Zoological Record from 1980 to 2004.

In 2004 the company was purchased by Thomson Scientific and it is now part of Thomson Reuters Science & Healthcare division. The proceeds from that sale were applied to fund an endowment and create a new grant-making foundation. The Board of Directors of that foundation selected as the organization's new name: J.R.S. Biodiversity Foundation. This reflected both the historic legacy of the Foundation and its future grant-making domain. The initials J.R.S. stand for the name of one of the founders of BIOSIS. In 2007, Wolters Kluwer announced the digital availability of the BIOSIS Archive and Zoological Record Archive databases, via their Ovid Technologies online services. The BIOSIS Archive consists of the data from the print volumes of Biological Abstracts from 1926 to 1968, and the Zoological Record Archive contains the data published in print in The Zoological Record from 1864 to 1977. In 2010 Biosis Citation Index was released on the Web of Knowledge Platform, combining extensive indexing and database coverage of Biosis Previews with the Web of Science's citation tracking features.
