= IHI =

IHI can refer to:

- Ifakara Health Institute, a health research organization in Tanzania
- Information Holdings Inc., part of the Thomson Corporation since 2004
- IHI Corporation, formerly known as Ishikawajima-Harima Heavy Industries, a Japanese manufacturing company
- Ice Hockey Iceland, ÍHÍ (Icelandic: Íshokkísamband Íslands)
- Innovative Health Initiative Joint Undertaking (IHI), a European Union pharmaceutical research initiative

== See also ==
- Ihi, a ceremonial marriage ritual in Nepal
- Ihi (goddess), the goddess of wisdom and learning in Tahitian mythology
