= Carswell (publisher) =

Canadian publisher

- Parent company: Thomson Reuters
- Founded: 1864
- Country of origin: Canada
- Headquarters location: Toronto
- Nonfiction topics: Law
- Imprints: Yvon Blais
- Official website: www.carswell.com

Carswell is a Canadian information source servicing legal, tax, accounting, and human resource professionals. Founded in 1864, it was purchased by the International Thomson Organization in 1987, and has since been a subsidiary of its successors, The Thomson Corporation (1989-2008), and Thomson Reuters (2008-).

== Modern day ==
Carswell offers products, services, customized training, and technical support to practitioners and organizations across Canada and beyond. With headquarters in Toronto, Ontario, Carswell provides products and services in a range of formats, including books, looseleaf services, journals, newsletters, CD-ROMs, and online products. Les Éditions Yvon Blais, a specialized legal publisher in the Quebec market, has been part of Carswell since 1996. Lexpert, Canada's leading source of news and information about the business of law, was acquired in 2004 then subsequently sold in 2019 to HAB Press, a division of Key Media. The Cyberbahn Group, a leading provider of corporate and commercial searches, company registrations, and litigation services in Canada, joined Carswell in 2008 and was later sold to Dye & Durham in 2019. Canada Law Book joined Carswell in 2010.

Carswell was named one of Canada's 50 Best Employers by The Globe and Mail Report on Business magazine in 2004, 2005, and 2006. Maclean's Magazine named Carswell one of Canada's Top 100 Employers and one of Greater Toronto's Top Employers.
