= Thomson Scientific =

Strategic business unit

Thomson Scientific was one of the six (later five) strategic business units of The Thomson Corporation, beginning in 2007, after being separated from Thomson Scientific & Healthcare. Following the merger of Thomson with Reuters Group to form Thomson Reuters in 2008, it became the "Scientific" business unit of the new company. In 2009, the unit came together with the Healthcare division of Thomson Reuters to form the Healthcare & Science division. The healthcare business was sold in 2012 to become Truven Health Analytics. The Science unit of Thomson Reuters provided information services for the academic, business, and R&D communities. It had headquarters in Philadelphia, London, Singapore and Tokyo with about 2,400 staff in more than 20 countries. Its products were Aureka, Delphion, Cortellis, Derwent World Patents Index (DWPI), EndNote, Horizon Global, Horizon Sourcing, IDdb, IDRAC, IP Management Services, ISI Web of Knowledge, MicroPatent PatentWeb, Techstreet Industry Standards, ThomsonPharma, GeneGo, IDDB, Thomson Regulatory Solutions, and Web of Science.

In late 2011, Thomson Reuters announced a new organizational structure, with one of its divisions being Intellectual Property & Science. This science unit of Thomson Reuters (known as IP & Science unit) was sold in 2016 to Onex and Baring Private Equity Asia for $3.5 billion. The newly independent company was named Clarivate Analytics.

== See also ==
- Institute for Scientific Information
