= Drugs.com =

Online pharmaceutical encyclopedia

- Type: Private
- Industry: Healthcare
- Founded: September 2001; 25 years ago
- Headquarters: New Zealand
- Website: drugs.com

Drugs.com is an online pharmaceutical encyclopedia that provides drug information for consumers and healthcare professionals, primarily in the United States. It self-describes its information as "accurate and independent" yet limited to being "for educational purposes only and is not intended for medical advice, diagnosis or treatment."

== Website ==
The Drugs.com website is owned and operated by the Drugsite Trust, a privately held Trust administered by two New Zealand pharmacists, Karen Ann and Phillip James Thornton. Operated on the IBM Cloud, Drugs.com provides information on some 24,000 drugs, was visited by 50 million users per month in 2021, and has a download time of one second.

The site contains a library of reference information which includes content from Cerner Multum, Micromedex, Truven Health Analytics, U.S. Food and Drug Administration (FDA), AHFS, Harvard Health Publications, Mayo Clinic, and Animalytics (a veterinary products database).

Drugs.com is certified by the TRUSTe online privacy certification program and the HONcode of Health on the Net Foundation.

The Drugs.com encyclopedia contains drug information for consumers, a portal for drugs based on diseases, a health professionals database of drug monographs, a natural products database, and a poison control center. Drugs.com is not affiliated with any pharmaceutical companies.

== History ==
The domain Drugs.com was originally registered by Bonnie Neubeck in 1994. In 1999 at the height of the dotcom boom, Eric MacIver purchased an option to buy the domain from Neubeck. In August 1999, MacIver sold the domain at auction for US$823,666 to Venture Frogs, a startup incubator run by Tony Hsieh and Alfred Lin, best known for their involvement in LinkExchange and later Zappos.com. Venture Frogs sold the Drugs.com domain name to a private investor in June 2001, allowing Hsieh and Lin to focus on Zappos.com.

The Drugs.com website was officially launched in September 2001. In March 2008, Drugs.com announced the release of Mednotes — an online personal medication record application which connected to Google Health (On June 24, 2011, Google announced it was retiring Google Health on January 1, 2012).

In May 2010, U.S. FDA announced a collaboration with Drugs.com to distribute consumer health updates on the Drugs.com website and mobile platform.

In February 2016, comScore stated that Drugs.com was the sixth most popular health network receiving approximately 23 million visitors for the month, while Searchmetrics listed Drugs.com in the top 100 US websites for search visibility.

In April 2017, The Harris Poll listed Drugs.com as the Health Information Website Brand of the Year.
