= Reuters =

International news agency

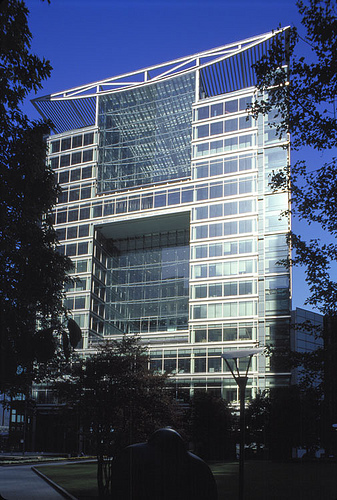
- Reuters' editorial office at 5 Canada Square in Canary Wharf, London
- Type: Division
- Industry: News agency
- Founded: October 1851; 175 years ago
- Founder: Paul Julius Reuter
- Area served: Worldwide
- Key people: Paul Bascobert (president); Alessandra Galloni (editor-in-chief)
- Owner: Thomson Reuters (Thomson family)
- Number of employees: 25,000
- Website: reuters.com

Reuters (/ˈrɔɪtərz/ ROY-tərz) is a British news agency wholly owned by Thomson Reuters, a multinational information conglomerate. It employs around 2,500 journalists and 600 photojournalists in 200 locations and 165 countries worldwide writing in 16 languages. Reuters is one of the largest news agencies in the world.

Reuters does not have a single headquarters. The leadership team is split between multiple locations. Paul Bascobert, the president of Reuters News, is based in New York, while the editor-in-chief, Alessandra Galloni, is based in Reuters' UK editorial headquarters in Canary Wharf, London.

The agency was established in London in 1851 by the German-born British baron Paul Reuter. The Thomson Corporation of Canada acquired the agency in a 2008 corporate merger, resulting in the formation of the Thomson Reuters Corporation.

In December 2024, Reuters was ranked as the 27th most visited news site in the world, with over 105 million monthly readers.

== History ==
=== 19th century ===
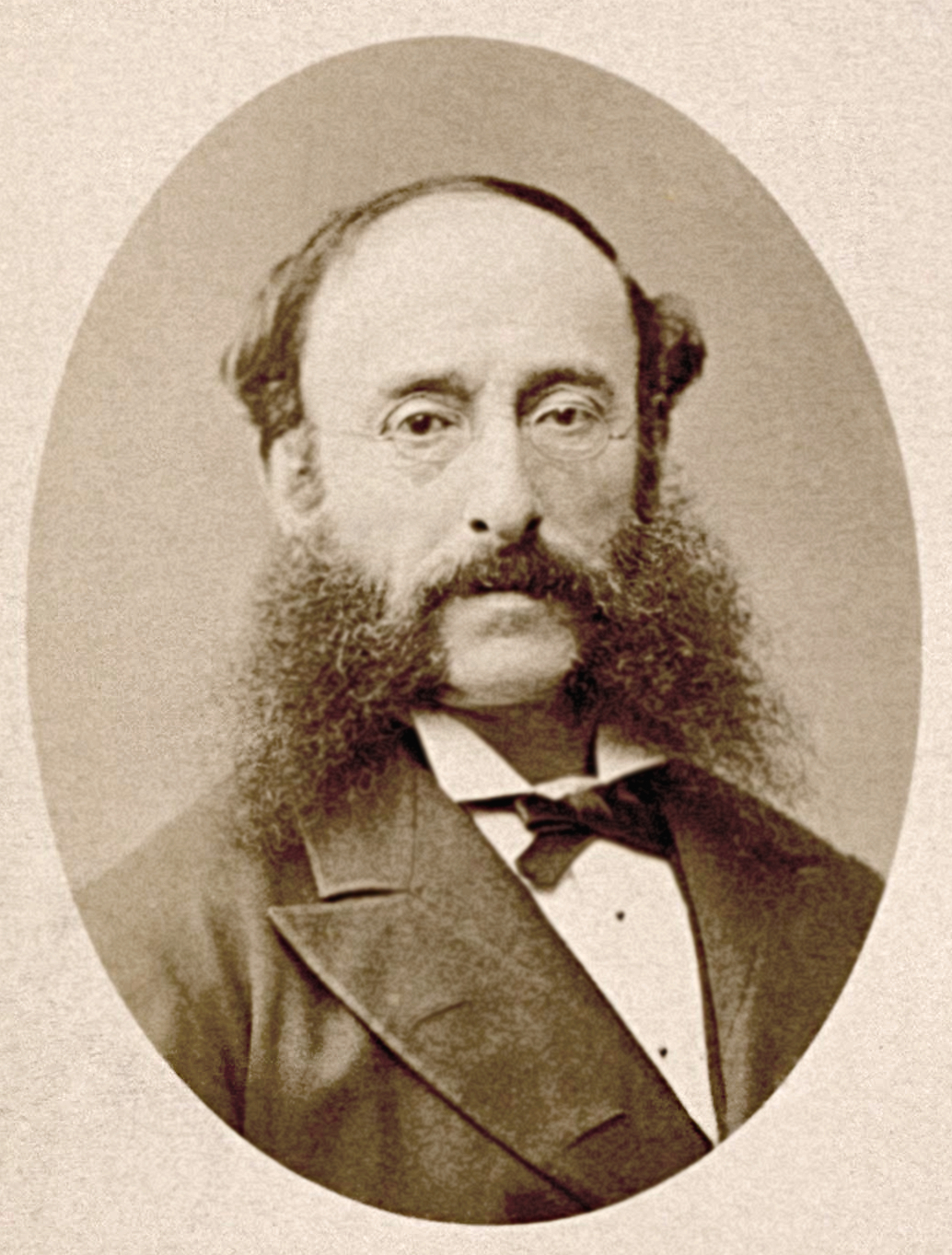
Paul Reuter, the founder of Reuters (photographed by Nadar, c. 1865)

Paul Julius Reuter worked at a book-publishing firm in Berlin and was involved in distributing radical pamphlets at the beginning of the revolutions of 1848. These publications brought much attention to Reuter, who in 1850 developed a prototype news service in Aachen using homing pigeons and electric telegraphy from 1851 on, in order to transmit messages between Brussels and Aachen, in what today is Aachen's Reuters House.

Reuter moved to London in 1851 and established a news wire agency at the London Royal Exchange. Headquartered in London, Reuter's company initially covered commercial news, serving banks, brokerage houses, and business firms. The first newspaper client to subscribe was the London Morning Advertiser in 1858, and more began to subscribe soon after. According to the Encyclopædia Britannica: "the value of Reuters to newspapers lay not only in the financial news it provided but in its ability to be the first to report on stories of international importance." It was the first to report Abraham Lincoln's assassination in Europe, for instance, in 1865.

In 1865, Reuter incorporated his private business, under the name Reuter's Telegram Company Limited; Reuter was appointed managing director of the company.

In 1870 the press agencies French Havas (founded in 1835), British Reuter's (founded in 1851) and German Wolff (founded in 1849) signed an agreement (known as the Ring Combination) that set 'reserved territories' for the three agencies. Each agency made its own separate contracts with national agencies or other subscribers within its territory. In practice, Reuters, who came up with the idea, tended to dominate the Ring Combination. Its influence was greatest because its reserved territories were larger or of greater news importance than most others. It also had more staff and stringers throughout the world and thus contributed more original news to the pool. British control of cable lines made London itself an unrivalled centre for world news, further enhanced by Britain's wide-ranging commercial, financial and imperial activities.

In 1872, Reuter's expanded into the Far East, followed by South America in 1874. Both expansions were made possible by advances in overland telegraphs and undersea cables. In 1878, Reuter retired as managing director, and was succeeded by his eldest son, Herbert de Reuter. In 1883, Reuter's began transmitting messages electrically to London newspapers.

=== 20th century ===
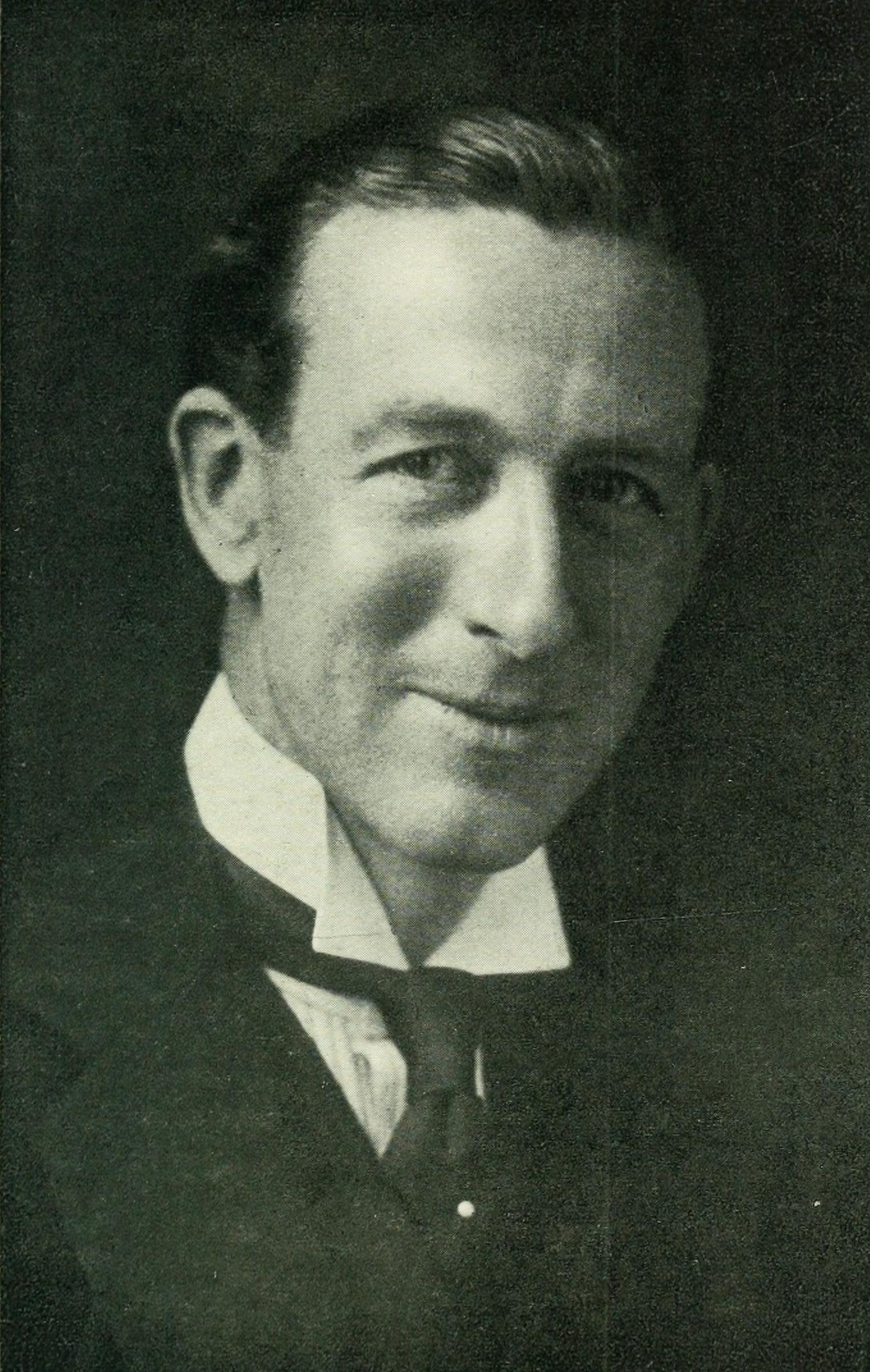
Roderick Jones, general manager 1915–1941

Reuter's son Herbert de Reuter continued as general manager until his death by suicide in 1915. The company returned to private ownership in 1916, when all shares were purchased by Roderick Jones and Mark Napier; they renamed the company "Reuters Limited" and dropped the apostrophe. In 1923, Reuters began using radio to transmit news internationally, a pioneering act. In 1925, the Press Association (PA) of Great Britain acquired a majority interest in Reuters, and full ownership some years later. The company moved to a new headquarters at 85 Fleet Street in the 1930s.

During the world wars, The Manchester Guardian reported that Reuters: "came under pressure from the British government to serve national interests. In 1941, Reuters deflected the pressure by restructuring itself as a private company." In 1941, the PA sold half of Reuters to the Newspaper Proprietors' Association, and co-ownership was expanded in 1947 to associations that represented daily newspapers in New Zealand and Australia. The new owners formed the Reuters Trust. The Reuters Trust Principles were put in place to maintain the company's independence. At that point, Reuters had become "one of the world's major news agencies, supplying both text and images to newspapers, other news agencies, and radio and television broadcasters." Also at that point, it directly, or through national news agencies, provided service to most countries, reaching virtually all the world's leading newspapers and many thousands of smaller ones, according to Britannica.

In 1961, Reuters scooped news of the erection of the Berlin Wall. Reuters was one of the first news agencies to transmit financial data over oceans via computers in the 1960s. In 1973, Reuters "began making computer-terminal displays of foreign-exchange rates available to clients." In 1981, Reuters began supporting electronic transactions on its computer network and afterwards developed a number of electronic brokerage and trading services. Reuters was floated as a public company in 1984, when Reuters Trust was listed on stock exchanges including the London Stock Exchange (LSE) and NASDAQ. Reuters later published the first story of the Berlin Wall being breached in 1989.

Reuters was the dominant news service on the Internet in the 1990s. It earned this position by developing a partnership with ClariNet and PointCast, two early Internet-based news providers.

=== 21st century ===
Reuters' share price grew during the dotcom boom, then fell after the banking troubles in 2001. In 2002, Britannica wrote that most news throughout the world came from three major agencies: the Associated Press, Reuters, and Agence France-Presse. The company moved to 30 South Colonnade in Canary Wharf in 2005.

Until 2008, the Reuters news agency formed part of an independent company, Reuters Group plc. Reuters was acquired by the Canadian Thomson Corporation in 2008, forming Thomson Reuters. In 2009, Thomson Reuters withdrew from the LSE and the NASDAQ, instead listing its shares on the Toronto Stock Exchange (TSX) and the New York Stock Exchange (NYSE). The last surviving member of the Reuters family founders, Marguerite, Baroness de Reuter, died at age 96 on 25 January 2009. The parent company Thomson Reuters is headquartered in Toronto, and provides financial information to clients while also maintaining its traditional news-agency business.

In 2012, Thomson Reuters appointed Jim Smith as CEO. In July 2016, Thomson Reuters agreed to sell its intellectual property and science operation for $3.55 billion to private equity firms. In October 2016, Thomson Reuters announced expansions and relocations to Toronto. As part of cuts and restructuring, in November 2016, Thomson Reuters Corp. eliminated 2,000 jobs worldwide out of its estimated 50,000 employees. On 15 March 2020, Steve Hasker was appointed president and CEO.

In 2020, the photography staff of Reuters won the Pulitzer Prize for Breaking News Photography for wide-ranging and illuminating coverage of the 2019–2020 Hong Kong protests.

In April 2021, Reuters announced that its website would go behind a paywall, following rivals who have done the same.

In March 2024, Gannett, the largest newspaper publisher in the United States, signed an agreement with Reuters to use the wire service's global content after cancelling its contract with the Associated Press.

In 2024, Reuters staff won the Pulitzer Prize for National Reporting for their work on Elon Musk and misconduct at his businesses, including SpaceX, Tesla, and Neuralink, as well as the Pulitzer Prize for Breaking News Photography for coverage of the Gaza war. As of 2025, Reuters has won a total of 13 Pulitzer Prizes since 2008.

In April 2026, an agreement was reached between Reuters and the National Basketball Association to distribute video highlights and official league content worldwide, with the aim of strengthening its media presence and international monetization.

== Journalists ==
Reuters employs some 2,500 journalists and 600 photojournalists in about 200 locations worldwide. Reuters journalists use the Standards and Values as a guide for fair presentation and disclosure of relevant interests, to "maintain the values of integrity and freedom upon which their reputation for reliability, accuracy, speed and exclusivity relies."

In May 2000, Kurt Schork, an American reporter, was killed in an ambush while on assignment in Sierra Leone. In April and August 2003, news cameramen Taras Protsyuk and Mazen Dana were killed in separate incidents by U.S. troops in Iraq. In July 2007, Namir Noor-Eldeen and Saeed Chmagh were killed when they were struck by fire from a U.S. military Apache helicopter in Baghdad. During 2004, cameraman Adlan Khasanov was killed by Chechen separatists, and Dhia Najim was killed in Iraq. In April 2008, cameraman Fadel Shana was killed in the Gaza Strip after being hit by an Israeli tank. On 27 August 2025, cameraman Hussam al-Masri was killed at Nasser Hospital in the Gaza Strip by an Israeli air strike.

While covering China's Cultural Revolution in Peking in the late 1960s for Reuters, journalist Anthony Grey was detained by the Chinese government in response to the jailing of several Chinese journalists by the colonial British government of Hong Kong. He was released after being imprisoned for 27 months from 1967 to 1969 and was awarded an OBE by the British Government. After his release, he went on to become a best-selling historical novelist.

In May 2016, the Ukrainian website Myrotvorets published the names and personal data of 4,508 journalists, including Reuters reporters, and other media staff from all over the world, who were accredited by the self-proclaimed authorities in the separatist-controlled regions of eastern Ukraine.

In 2018, two Reuters journalists were convicted in Myanmar of obtaining state secrets while investigating a massacre in a Rohingya village. The arrest and convictions were widely condemned as an attack on press freedom. The journalists, Wa Lone and Kyaw Soe Oo, received several awards, including the Foreign Press Association Media Award and the Pulitzer Prize for International Reporting, and were named as part of the Time Person of the Year for 2018 along with other persecuted journalists. After 511 days in prison, Wa Lone and Kyaw Soe Oo were freed on 7 May 2019 after receiving a presidential pardon.

In February 2023, a team of Reuters journalists won the Selden Ring Award for their investigation that exposed human-rights abuses by the Nigerian military.

=== Killed on assignment ===
Name	Nationality	Location	Date	Responsible party
Kenneth Stonehouse	British	Bay of Biscay	1 June 1943	German aircraft
Hosea 'Hos' Maina	Kenyan	Somalia	12 July 1993	
Dan Eldon	Kenyan	Somalia	12 July 1993	
Kurt Schork	American	Sierra Leone	24 May 2000	
Taras Protsyuk	Ukrainian	Iraq	8 April 2003	U.S. troops
Mazen Dana	Palestinian	Iraq	17 August 2003	U.S. troops
Adlan Khasanov	Russian	Chechnya	9 May 2004	Chechen separatists
Waleed Khaled	Iraqi	Iraq	28 August 2005	U.S. troops
Namir Noor-Eldeen	Iraqi	Iraq	12 July 2007	U.S. military Apache helicopter
Saeed Chmagh	Iraqi	Iraq	12 July 2007	U.S. military Apache helicopter
Fadel Shana'a	Palestinian	Gaza Strip	16 April 2008	Israeli troops
Hiro Muramoto	Japanese	Thailand	10 April 2010	Thai troops
Molhem Barakat	Syrian	Syria	20 December 2013	Syrian forces/rebels
Danish Siddiqui	Indian	Afghanistan	16 July 2021	Taliban
Issam Abdallah	Lebanese	Lebanon	13 October 2023	Israeli troops

== Pulitzer Prizes ==
Reuters has won 13 Pulitzer Prizes, all since 2008.

Year	Category	Winners	Description	Ref
2025	Investigative Reporting	Staff of Reuters	For the "Fentanyl Express" series exposing lax regulations enabling the international fentanyl trade.	
2024	National Reporting	Staff of Reuters	For a series on misconduct and regulatory failures at Elon Musk's businesses (including SpaceX, Tesla, and Neuralink).	
2024	Breaking News Photography	Photography Staff of Reuters	For raw and urgent images of the October 7 Hamas attack on Israel and the initial weeks of Israel's assault on Gaza.	
2020	Breaking News Photography	Photography Staff of Reuters	For wide-ranging and illuminating coverage of the 2019–2020 Hong Kong protests.	
2019	International Reporting	Staff of Reuters (notable contributions from Wa Lone and Kyaw Soe Oo)	For exposing the Myanmar military's brutal campaign against Rohingya Muslims, leading to the imprisonment of the journalists.	
2018	International Reporting	Clare Baldwin, Andrew R.C. Marshall, and Manuel Mogato	For relentless reporting on Philippines President Rodrigo Duterte's deadly war on drugs.	
2008	Breaking News Photography	Adrees Latif	For his dramatic photograph of a Japanese videographer fatally shot during a street protest in Myanmar.	
Reuters has won additional prizes in categories such as Breaking News Photography, Feature Photography, and International Reporting between 2009 and 2023, bringing the total to 13. For the complete list, see the official Pulitzer Prize website.

== Controversies ==
=== Accusation of collaboration with the CIA ===
In 1977, Rolling Stone and The New York Times said that according to information from CIA officials, Reuters cooperated with the CIA. In response to that, Reuters' then-managing director, Gerald Long, had asked for evidence of the charges, but none was provided, according to Reuters' then-managing editor for North America, Desmond Maberly.

=== Vukovar children massacre hoax ===
Two days after the Battle of Vukovar had ended, on 20 November 1991, Reuters reported that 41 Serb babies had been murdered in the city during the battle. The report quoted Goran Mikić, freelance photographer in the area who supplied pictures for Reuters, told Reuters and the Radio Television of Serbia (RTS) that he had seen and counted bodies of 41 children between the ages of five and seven slaughtered in a school in Borovo Naselje, and added he was told by Yugoslav Army soldiers that the children were Serbs killed by Croatian soldiers. Although Reuters retracted the report a day later, based on his admission that he neither saw nor counted the bodies, the news made headlines in Serbia, where it was used to promote the importance of the "defense of Serb hearths" in Croatia. This misinformation led to supposed retaliations, including the Ovčara massacre which took place 20–21 November 1991, in which Serb forces executed 264 Croatian prisoners of war and civilians.

=== Policy of objective language ===
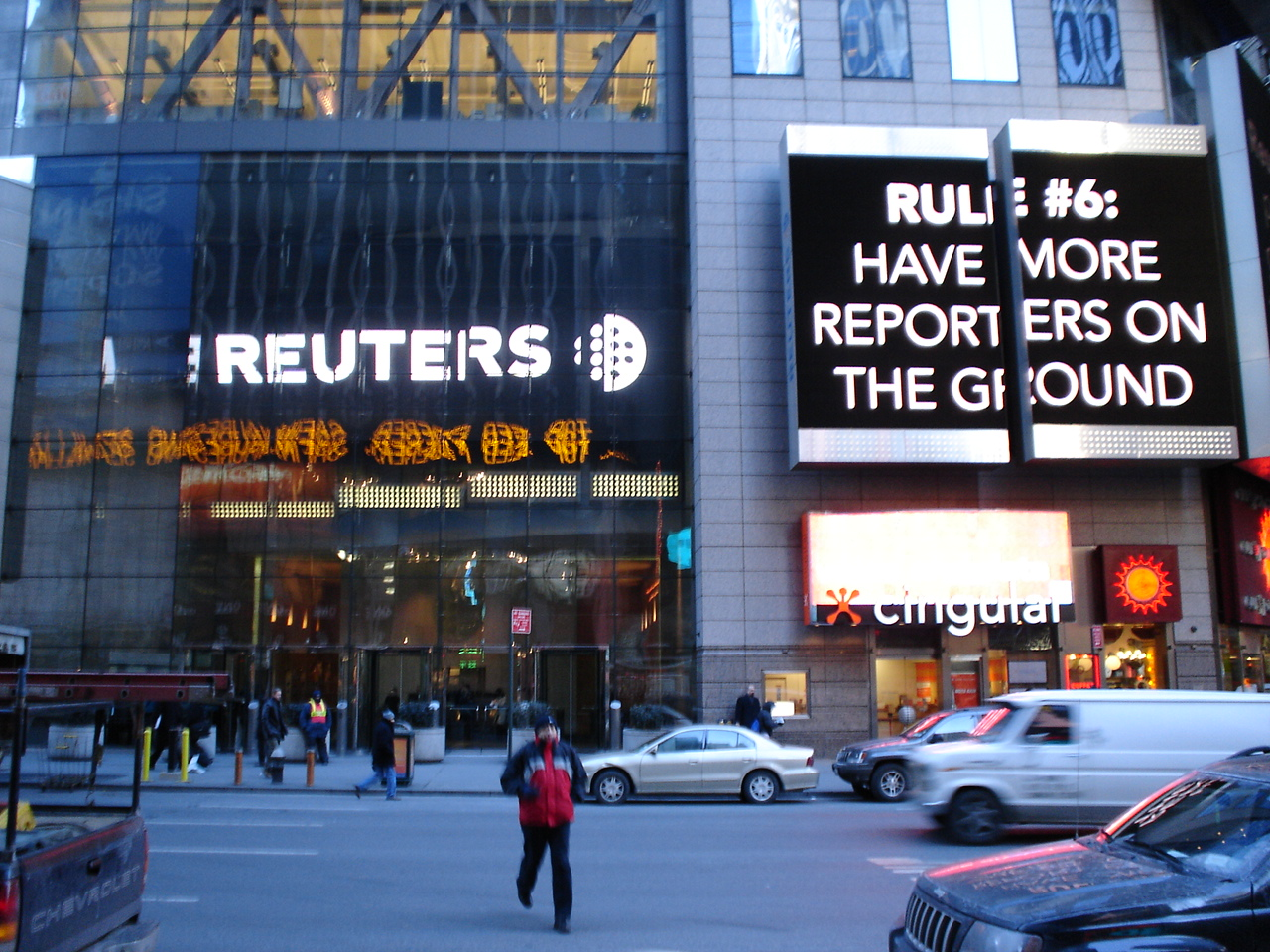
Reuters building entrance in New York City

Reuters has a policy of taking a "value-neutral approach," which extends to not using the word terrorist in its stories. The practice attracted criticism following the September 11 attacks. Reuters' editorial policy states: "Reuters may refer without attribution to terrorism and counterterrorism in general, but do not refer to specific events as terrorism. Nor does Reuters use the word terrorist without attribution to qualify specific individuals, groups or events." In 2004, Reuters asked CanWest Global Communications, a Canadian newspaper chain, to remove Reuters' bylines, as the chain had edited Reuters articles to insert the word terrorist. A spokesman for Reuters stated: "My goal is to protect my reporters and protect our editorial integrity."

=== Climate change reporting ===
In July 2013, David Fogarty, former Reuters climate change correspondent in Asia, resigned after a career of almost 20 years with the company and wrote that "progressively, getting any climate change-themed story published got harder" after comments from then-deputy editor-in-chief Paul Ingrassia that he was a "climate change sceptic." In his comments, Fogarty stated:

By mid-October, I was informed that climate change just wasn't a big story for the present, but that it would be if there was a significant shift in global policy, such as the US introducing an emissions cap-and-trade system. Very soon after that conversation I was told my climate change role was abolished.

Ingrassia, formerly Reuters' managing editor, previously worked for The Wall Street Journal and Dow Jones for 31 years. Reuters responded to Fogarty's piece by stating: "Reuters has a number of staff dedicated to covering this story, including a team of specialist reporters at Point Carbon and a columnist. There has been no change in our editorial policy."

Subsequently, climate blogger Joe Romm of ThinkProgress cited a Reuters article on climate as having a "false balance" and quoted Stefan Rahmstorf, co-chair of Earth System Analysis at the Potsdam Institute, saying "[s]imply, a lot of unrelated climate sceptics nonsense has been added to this Reuters piece. In the words of the late Steve Schneider, this is like adding some nonsense from the Flat Earth Society to a report about the latest generation of telecommunication satellites. It is absurd." Romm suggests: "The fact that the blather was all inserted without attribution suggests it was added at the insistence of an editor."

=== Photograph controversies ===
According to Ynetnews, Reuters was accused of bias against Israel in its coverage of the 2006 Israel–Lebanon conflict after the wire service used two doctored photos by a Lebanese freelance photographer, Adnan Hajj. In August 2006, Reuters announced it had severed all ties with Hajj and said his photographs would be removed from its database.

In 2010, Reuters was criticised again by Haaretz for "anti-Israeli" bias when it cropped the edges of photos, removing commandos' knives held by activists and a naval commando's blood from photographs taken aboard the Mavi Marmara during the 2010 Gaza flotilla, a raid that left nine Turkish activists dead. It has been alleged that in two separate photographs, knives held by the activists were cropped out of the versions of the pictures published by Reuters. Reuters said it is standard operating procedure to crop photos at the margins, and replaced the cropped images with the original ones after it was brought to the agency's attention.

=== Indian man falsely accused of cybercrime ===
On 9 June 2020, three Reuters journalists (Jack Stubbs, Raphael Satter and Christopher Bing) incorrectly used the image of an Indian herbal medicine entrepreneur in an exclusive story titled "Obscure Indian cyber firm spied on politicians, investors worldwide." Indian local media picked up the report, and the man whose image was wrongly used was invited and interrogated for nine hours by Indian police. Reuters admitted to the error, with Satter claiming that it had mistaken the man for the suspected hacker Sumit Gupta because both men share the same business address. A check by local media, however, showed that both men were in different buildings. As the report of the inaccurate reporting trickled out to the public, Reuters' senior director of communication Heather Carpenter contacted at least one media outlet to ask them to take down their post.

=== Fernando Henrique Cardoso interview ===
In March 2015, the Brazilian affiliate of Reuters released an excerpt of an interview with Brazilian ex-president Fernando Henrique Cardoso about Operation Car Wash (Portuguese: Operação Lava Jato), in which several politicians from Brazil were found to have accepted bribes from corporations in exchange for government contracts. After the scandal, the excerpt from Brazil's president Cardoso's interview was released. In the publication, a former Petrobras manager suggested that corruption in the company may date back to Cardoso's presidency. Attached was a comment in parentheses: "Podemos tirar, se achar melhor" ("we can take it out if you think it would be better"). This confused readers, suggesting that the former president was involved in corruption and that the comment was attributed to him. Reuters later confirmed the error and explained that the comment was from an editor, intended for the journalist who wrote the original English text; it was removed from later publications.

=== Funding by the UK Government ===
In November 2019, the UK Foreign Office released archive documents confirming that it had provided funding to Reuters during the 1960s and 1970s so that Reuters could expand its coverage in the Middle East. An agreement was made between the Information Research Department (IRD) and Reuters for the UK Treasury to provide £350,000 over four years to fund Reuters' expansion. The UK government had already been funding the Latin American department of Reuters through a shell company, but that method was discounted for the Middle East operation since the accounting of the shell company looked suspicious. Instead, the BBC was used to fund the project by paying for enhanced subscriptions to the news organisation for which the Treasury would reimburse the BBC at a later date. The IRD acknowledged that this agreement would not give them editorial control over Reuters, although they believed it would give them political influence "from Reuters' willingness to consult and to listen to views expressed on the results of its work."

=== Partnership with TASS ===
On 1 June 2020, Reuters announced that Russian news agency TASS had joined its "Reuters Connect" programme, comprising 18 partner agencies at the time. Two years later, TASS's membership in Reuters Connect came under scrutiny in the wake of the 2022 Russian invasion of Ukraine; Politico reported that Reuters staff members were "frustrated and embarrassed" that their agency had not suspended its partnership with TASS.

On 23 March 2022, Reuters removed TASS from its "content marketplace." Matthew Keen, interim CEO of Reuters, said "we believe making TASS content available on Reuters Connect is not aligned with the Thomson Reuters Trust Principles."

=== Fossil fuel advertising ===
An investigation by The Intercept, The Nation, Drilled, and DeSmog found that Reuters is one of the leading media outlets that publishes advertising for the fossil fuel industry. Some journalists who cover climate change for Reuters are concerned that conflicts of interest with the companies and industries responsible reduces the credibility of their reporting and causes readers to downplay the climate crisis. Reuters later removed a Saudi Aramco-sponsored podcast on energy.

=== Allegations of journalism in India without authorization ===
In December 2023, the Indian Ministry of Home Affairs revoked the Overseas Citizenship of India (OCI) status of a Reuters cybersecurity journalist, Raphael Satter, alleging unauthorised journalistic activities in India. The ministry claimed the journalist violated regulations requiring OCI cardholders to obtain prior approval for such work. According to The Sunday Guardian, in a related incident, Satter faced legal scrutiny in Goa, India, where the journalist allegedly engaged in journalistic activities without permission – for example, contacting individuals in India for interviews during visits, despite claiming the trips were for personal purposes. Reuters supported the journalist's denial of conducting journalism in India, and a legal petition was filed in the Delhi High Court to challenge the OCI cancellation, with a hearing scheduled for May 22, 2025, though specific charges were not detailed.

=== Valerie Zink resignation ===
In August 2025, Valerie Zink, a photo journalist who had been working with Reuters for 8 years, announced her resignation from the agency after accusing it of perpetuating Israel's claims over its war in Gaza, at the expense of other journalists including its own reporters. She further accused Reuters of publishing Israel's claims that Anas Al-Sharif (a journalist working in Gaza) was a Hamas operative. She also stated that five more journalists, including Reuters cameraman Hossam Al-Masri, were among 20 people killed in an attack on Nasser hospital in the Gaza Strip.

=== Reporting of false news on India–U.S. trade negotiations ===
On 13 July 2026, Reuters published a report concerning negotiations over a proposed India–United States trade agreement. The report was publicly disputed by Indian Commerce and Industry Minister Piyush Goyal, who described it as "completely false" and stated that his meetings with U.S. Trade Representative Jamieson Greer had been constructive, with both sides committed to reaching a balanced agreement for businesses, farmers, and consumers.

The report was also challenged by Sergio Gor, the United States Ambassador to India, who stated that "no one has rejected anything" and urged Reuters to "do better".

Subsequent reporting noted that Indian officials said trade negotiations were continuing without major obstacles and that a framework agreement was ready to be signed when both sides considered the timing appropriate.

== See also ==
- List of news agencies
- Media of the United Kingdom

=== Related to Reuters ===
- Reuters Instrument Code
- Reuters Insider
- Reuters Market Data System
- Reuters Market Light
- Reuters 3000 Xtra
- Reuters TV

=== Related to Thomson Reuters ===
- Thomson Reuters Business Classification
- Thomson Reuters Citation Laureates
- Thomson Reuters Foundation
- Thomson Reuters Indices
- Thomson Reuters/Jefferies CRB Index
- Thomson Reuters league tables
- Thomson Reuters Messenger
- Thomson Reuters Realized Volatility Index
