= Mitchell International =

American software company

Mitchell International, Inc.
- Type: Private
- Industry: Software
- Founded: 1946
- Founder: Glenn Mitchell
- Headquarters: San Diego, California
- Key people: Larry Bossidy; Chairman of the Board; Alex Sun; President and CEO
- Revenue: ▲$300 Million USD (2010)
- Owner: Stone Point Capital
- Number of employees: 1,700
- Website: www.mitchell.com

Mitchell International, Inc. is an American company based in San Diego, California, which develops software used by the automotive industry to manage collision and medical claims, parts and labor estimates, and glass replacement quotes. Mitchell operates throughout the United States and Canada, and processes more than 50 million transactions a year for more than 300 insurance companies, more than 30,000 collision repair facilities, independent adjusters, and other vehicle repair participants.

== Business Units ==
Mitchell's business units include Auto Physical Damage Division, Auto Casualty Solutions Division, Workers' Compensation Division, and NHQ Negotiation Services Division.

== Company history ==
Mitchell was founded in 1946 by Glenn Mitchell when he created a parts catalog for collision repair estimating. The company was once part of Thomson Corporation (now Thomson Reuters).

In 2000, Mitchell was acquired by private equity firm Hellman & Friedman, and then in 2007 was sold to Aurora Capital Group for approximately $500 million. The company is also former subsidiary of MIH Parent Inc.

In 2013, the private equity firm Kohlberg Kravis Roberts bought Mitchell from Aurora Capital for $1.1 billion. Stone Point Capital acquired Mitchell in 2018.

== Acquisitions ==
In February 2014, Mitchell announced plans to acquire FAIRPAY Solutions, a provider of workers' compensation, liability and billing review services. In December 2014, Mitchell announced that it had signed an agreement to acquire Cogent Works, a provider of pharmacy network management services to the automobile casualty and workers' compensation markets.

In March 2012, Mitchell announced its acquisition of National Health Quest, a provider of out-of-network medical payment negotiations and services.
