= Client portal =

Internet-accessible gateway for clients to access protected services and files

A client portal is an electronic gateway to a collection of digital files, services, and information, accessible over the Internet through a web browser.

The term is most often applied to a sharing mechanism between an organization and its clients. The organization provides a secure entry point, typically via a website, that lets its clients log into an area where they can view, download, and upload private information.

Client portals are most prevalently used for the secure exchange of financial information, usually when teams are working remotely. Privacy laws such as the Gramm–Leach–Bliley Act require that organizations encrypt their clients' personally identifiable information that is sent online electronically. Sharing such information through email does not comply with the Gramm–Leach–Bliley Act and other federal privacy laws. Client portals allow users to centralise and virtualise their organization, usually to increase efficiencies and communication.

Other advantages of client portals, as distinguished from email, include increased file size limitations and self-service access to a private repository.

Client portals are often used in conjunction with workflow automation and document management to maximize work environment efficiency.

== Industries ==
Client portals are prevalent in many industries. Industry sectors include various commercial organisations and aren't usually specific to one industry. Owing to the nature of the industry, law firms make up a significant number of client portal users. This is because lawyers are constantly collaborating and interacting with clients, involving a significant amount of paperwork. In these cases the file sharing functionality is imperative. Some client portal features extend to invoicing, time logging and expenses tracking. These benefits lead to a number of Small and medium enterprises using client portals to manage their business operations.

== Issues ==
Security has been a hot topic surrounding client portals. Many client portals feature 256 bit SSL, similar to that of online banking, but businesses with sensitive information, such as medical data, sometimes express concerns about their data being in the cloud. Businesses still wishing to use client portals usually adopt private cloud solutions and host the software on-premises.

== See also ==
- Document management
- Shared file access
- List of client portals
