= Integration Point (company) =

Integration Point, Inc.
- Type: Private
- Industry: Global Trade Management; Supply Chain Management, Import/Export Management
- Founded: 2002
- Founder: Tom Barnes
- Defunct: November 16, 2018
- Fate: Acquired by Thomson Reuters
- Successor: Thomson Reuters
- Headquarters: Charlotte, North Carolina, United States
- Key people: Tom Barnes (CEO); Clay Perry (SVP Global Markets); Melissa Irmen (SVP Products & Strategy)
- Website: integrationpoint.com

Integration Point was an American software company headquartered in Charlotte, North Carolina. The company specialized in the development, implementation and support of global trade management software to efficiently manage the import and export of goods around the world. The company was acquired in 2018 by Thomson Reuters.

This Software-as-a-Service (Saas) model was built utilizing cloud technology, which provides companies with a Global Trade Network that touches every transaction affecting trade compliance.

Integration Point was based in Charlotte, and had offices in Rochester, New York; El Paso, Texas; Reynosa, Mexico; Torreon, Mexico; Brussels, Belgium; Vadodara, India; Sao Paulo, Brazil; Tbilisi, Republic of Georgia; Frankfurt, Germany; Shanghai, China; Cape Town, South Africa; Kuala Lumpur, Malaysia; and Melbourne, Australia.

== History ==
Integration Point was founded in 2002 by Tom Barnes, who was also CEO of the company.

In 2002, Clay Perry joined Integration Point with 20 years of experience in managing technology teams throughout the manufacturing and distribution sectors of international trade.

In 2003, Melissa Irmen joined Integration Point and played an active role in various international trade initiatives and organizations, and spoke to media and conferences regularly on global trade topics including WCO, NAFTZ, ICPA, and AAEI.

In October 2018, Integration Point announced it was being acquired by Thomson Reuters for an undisclosed amount.
