= Reuters Insider =

Video embedding platform

Reuters Insider is a video platform owned by Refinitiv that enables the integration of video content into news and research workflows of financial professionals and individual investors.

It was initially launched by Thomson Reuters on May 11, 2010, as a website which allowed visitors to watch on-demand videos relating to the financial industry free-of-charge. The website was described as "YouTube for traders" and consisted of video content created by Thomson Reuters' own reporters, as well as the company's roughly 150 partners. Thomson Reuters spent about $100 million to develop the website and targeted its site and content to financial professionals, while Thomson Reuters primary competitor, Bloomberg L.P., had begun to focus more on targeting the average consumer by purchasing business magazine BusinessWeek. The website was part of an overall $1 billion plan by the company to update its technology to make financial information accessible to more users.
