= Reuters Group =

Former British media and financial information company

Reuters Group plc
- Type: Public
- Traded as: LSE: RT Nasdaq: RT FTSE 100 component (until 2008)
- Industry: Mass media
- Founded: October 1851; 175 years ago
- Defunct: 17 April 2008
- Fate: Acquired by the Thomson Corporation
- Successor: Thomson Reuters
- Headquarters: London, United Kingdom
- Divisions: Reuters

Reuters Group plc was a British multinational media and financial information company headquartered in London, United Kingdom. It was acquired by the Thomson Corporation in 2008, forming Thomson Reuters, and moved its head office to Toronto.

Reuters Group was best known for the Reuters news agency, which was the original business of the company. By the time of its acquisition by Thomson, the bulk of Reuters Group's revenues came from the provision of financial market data, with news reporting comprising less than 10% of its revenue.

== History ==
=== Beginnings ===
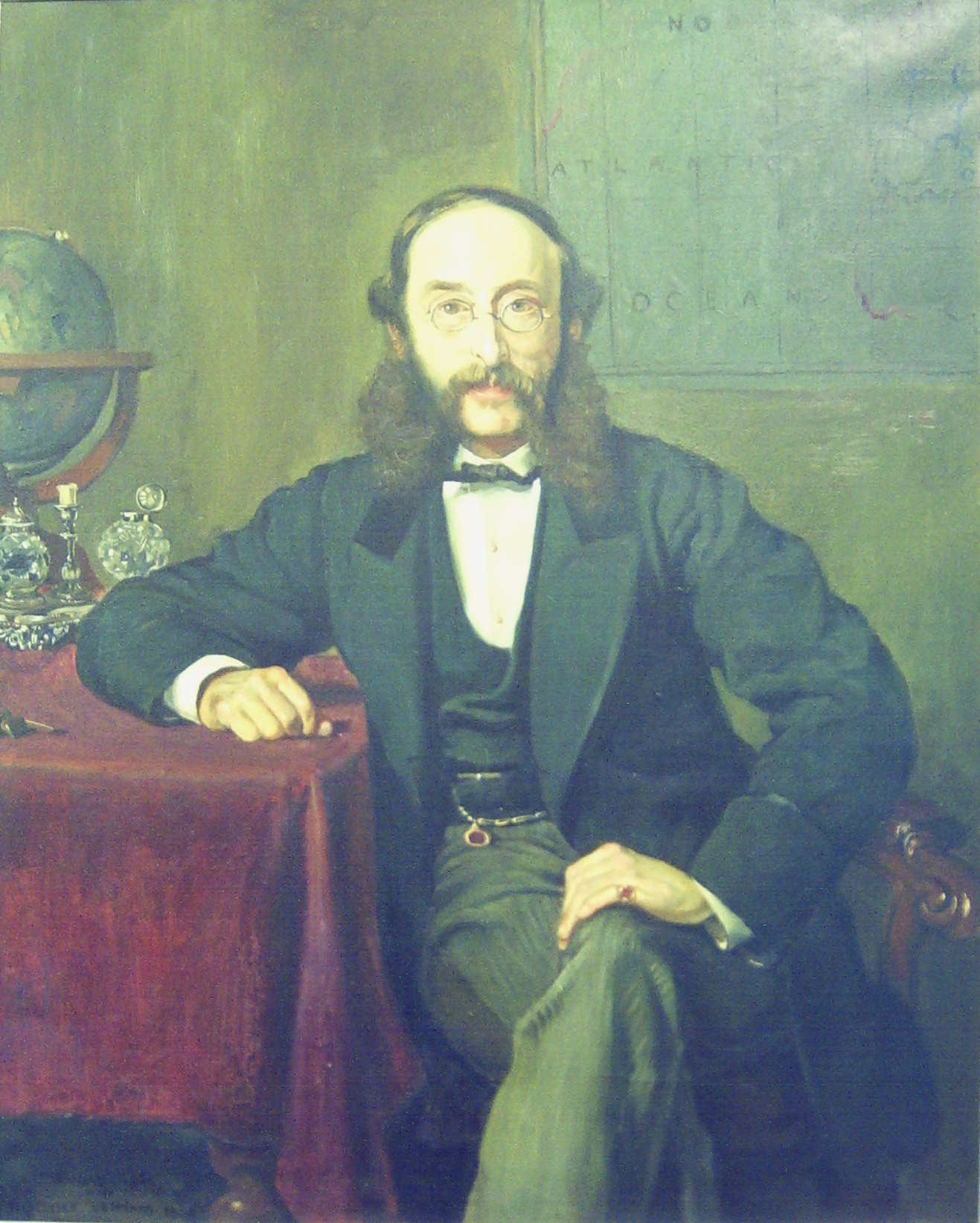
Paul Reuter aged 53 years (1869), by Rudolf Lehmann

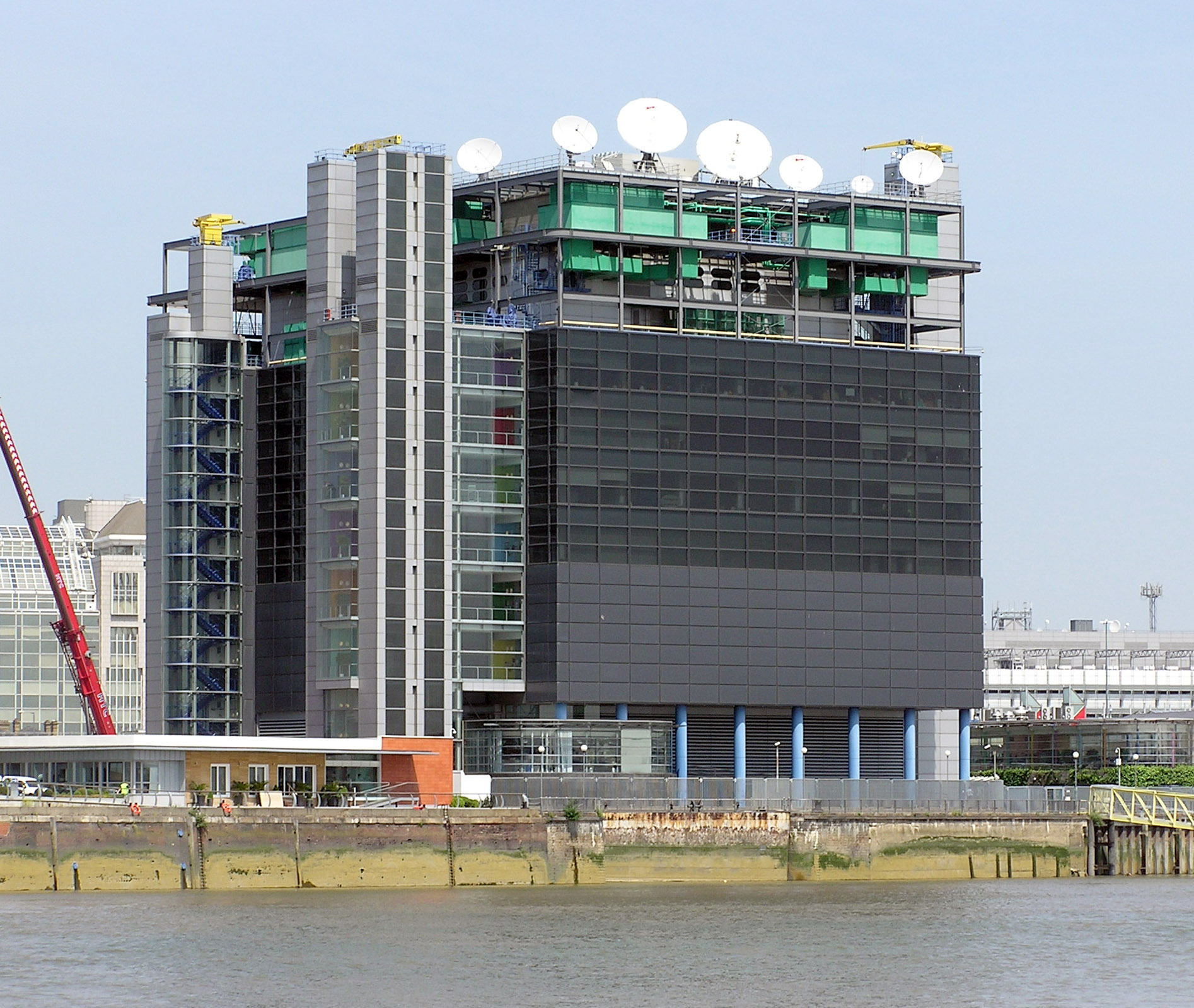
Reuters Docklands Technical Centre, in the London Docklands area

Paul Reuter noticed that, with the electric telegraph, news no longer required days or weeks to travel long distances. In the 1850s, the 34-year-old Reuter was based in Aachen – then in the Kingdom of Prussia, now in Germany – close to the borders with the Netherlands and Belgium. He began using the newly opened Berlin–Aachen telegraph line to send news to Berlin. However, the telegraph did not extend the 76 miles (122 km) to Brussels, Belgium's capital city and financial center. Reuter saw an opportunity to speed up news service between Brussels and Berlin by using homing pigeons to bridge that gap.

In 1851, Reuter moved to London. After failures in 1847 and 1850, attempts by the Submarine Telegraph Company to lay an undersea telegraph cable across the English Channel, from Dover to Calais, promised success. Reuter set up his "Submarine Telegraph" office in October 1851 just before the opening of that undersea cable in November, and he negotiated a contract with the London Stock Exchange to provide stock prices from exchanges in continental Europe in return for access to the London prices, which he then supplied to stockbrokers in Paris. In 1865, Reuter's private firm was restructured, and it became a limited company (a corporation) called the Reuter's Telegram Company Limited. Reuter had been naturalised as a British subject in 1857.

Reuter's agency built a reputation in Europe for being the first to report news scoops from abroad, such as Abraham Lincoln's assassination.

The last surviving member of the Reuters family founders, Marguerite, Baroness de Reuter, died at age 96 on 25 January 2009, after having suffered a series of strokes.

=== Initial public offering (IPO) ===
Reuters was financed as a public company in 1984 on the London Stock Exchange and on the NASDAQ in the United States. However, there were concerns that the company's tradition for objective reporting might be jeopardised if control of the company later fell into the hands of a single shareholder. To counter that possibility, the constitution of the company at the time of the stock offering included a rule that no individual was allowed to own more than 15% of the company. If this limit is exceeded, the directors can order the shareholder to reduce the holding to less than 15%. That rule was applied in the late 1980s when Rupert Murdoch's News Corporation, which already held around 15% of Reuters, bought an Australian news company that also owned stock in Reuters. Murdoch was subsequently compelled to reduce his holdings to less than 15%.

Further protecting Reuters from owner actions that might threaten its independence is Reuters Founders Share Company Limited, formed in 1984 as part of the share float. This company's stated mission is to protect the integrity of the company's news output. It holds one "Founders Share", which can veto all other shares if an attempt is made to alter any of the rules relating to the Reuters Trust Principles. These principles set out the company's aims of independence, integrity, and freedom from bias in its news reporting. Subsequent to the forming of Thomson Reuters the trust principles continued, with the RFSC now holding a Founders Share in each of Thomson Reuters Corporation and Thomson Reuters PLC.

=== Post-IPO expansion ===
Reuters grew rapidly after its 1984 IPO, widening the range of its business products and global reporting network for media, financial and economic services. In 1988, Reuters formed a joint-venture with the Chicago Mercantile Exchange to build an automated futures trading system named "Globex" at a cost of over US$100 million. Key product launches include Equities 2000 (1987), Dealing 2000-2 (1992), Business Briefing (1994), Reuters Television for the financial markets (1994), 3000 Series (1996) and the Reuters 3000 Xtra service (1999). In the mid-1990s, the Reuters company engaged in a brief foray in the radio sector – with London Radio's two radio stations, London News 97.3 FM and London News Talk 1152 AM. A Reuters Radio News service was also set up to compete with the Independent Radio News. In 1995, Reuters established its "Greenhouse Fund" to take minority investments in start-up technology companies, initially in the US, only. In October 2007, Reuters Market Light, a division of Reuters, launched a mobile phone service for Indian farmers to provide local and customised commodity pricing information, news, and weather updates.

=== Acquisition by Thomson ===
On 15 May 2007, Canada's The Thomson Corporation acquired Reuters in a deal valued at US$17.6 billion. Thomson controlled about 53 per cent of the new company, named Thomson Reuters. Tom Glocer, the former head of Reuters became the CEO of Thomson Reuters. An earlier rule of 15-per cent maximum ownership was waived; the reason as given by Pehr Gyllenhammar, the chairman of the Reuters Founders Share Company, as that the "future of Reuters takes precedence over the principles. If Reuters were not strong enough to continue on its own, the principles would have no meaning." (Note: Others dismissed this waiver as a convenience to get Company Management off the hook for poor performance.) citing the recent bad financial performance of the company. The acquisition was closed on 17 April 2008.

== Acquisitions and investments ==
- Action Images – In September 2005, Reuters purchased North London-based Action Images, a collection of sports photography of more than 8 million images, of which 1.7 million are online.
- Application Networks – In June 2006, Reuters acquired Application Networks, Inc., a provider of trade and risk management software based on JRisk, and agreed to acquire Feri Fund Market Information Ltd (FERI FMI) and its fund database subsidiary, FI Datenservice GmbH (FID).
- AVT Technologies – In December 2002, Reuters announced that it would acquire AVT Technologies, a specialist in foreign exchange transaction technology. Concurrent with the deal, Reuters established an Automated Dealing Technologies business unit, headed up by Mark Redwood, CEO of AVT Technologies.
- Bridge Information Systems – On 28 September 2001, it completed the largest acquisition in its history with a partial acquisition of Bridge Information Systems Inc. Also during the year, the Group acquired 100% of Diagram fip SA and 92% of ProTrader Group LP. In October 2001, the Group disposed of its majority stake in VentureOne Corp.
- ClearForest – In June 2007, Reuters acquired ClearForest, a provider of text analytics, whose tagging platform and analytical products allow clients to derive business information from textual content.
- EcoWin – In November 2005, Reuters acquired EcoWin, a Gothenburg (Sweden)–based provider of global financial, equities, and economic data.
- Factiva – In May 1999, Reuters entered a joint venture with rival Dow Jones & Company to form Factiva, a business news and information provider. In December 2006, Reuters sold its 50% share in Factiva to Dow Jones, who is now sole owner.
- Instinet – After taking a minority stake in Instinet in 1985, Reuters acquired the entire company in 1987. In May 2001, Reuters sold a minority stake in the firm via an IPO on NASDAQ, and in December 2005 sold the remainder of its share to NASDAQ and Silver Lake Partners.
- Multex.com Inc. – In March 2003, Reuters acquired Multex.com, Inc., a provider of global financial information.
- StarMine Corporation—In January 2008, Reuters acquired StarMine Corporation, a provider of equity research tools and quantitative analytics.
- TIBCO Software – In July 1999, TIBCO Software completed an IPO on NASDAQ; Reuters retains a substantial proportion of the shares. Reuters announced, in early 2000, initiatives designed to migrate core business to an internet-based model.

== Corporate locations ==
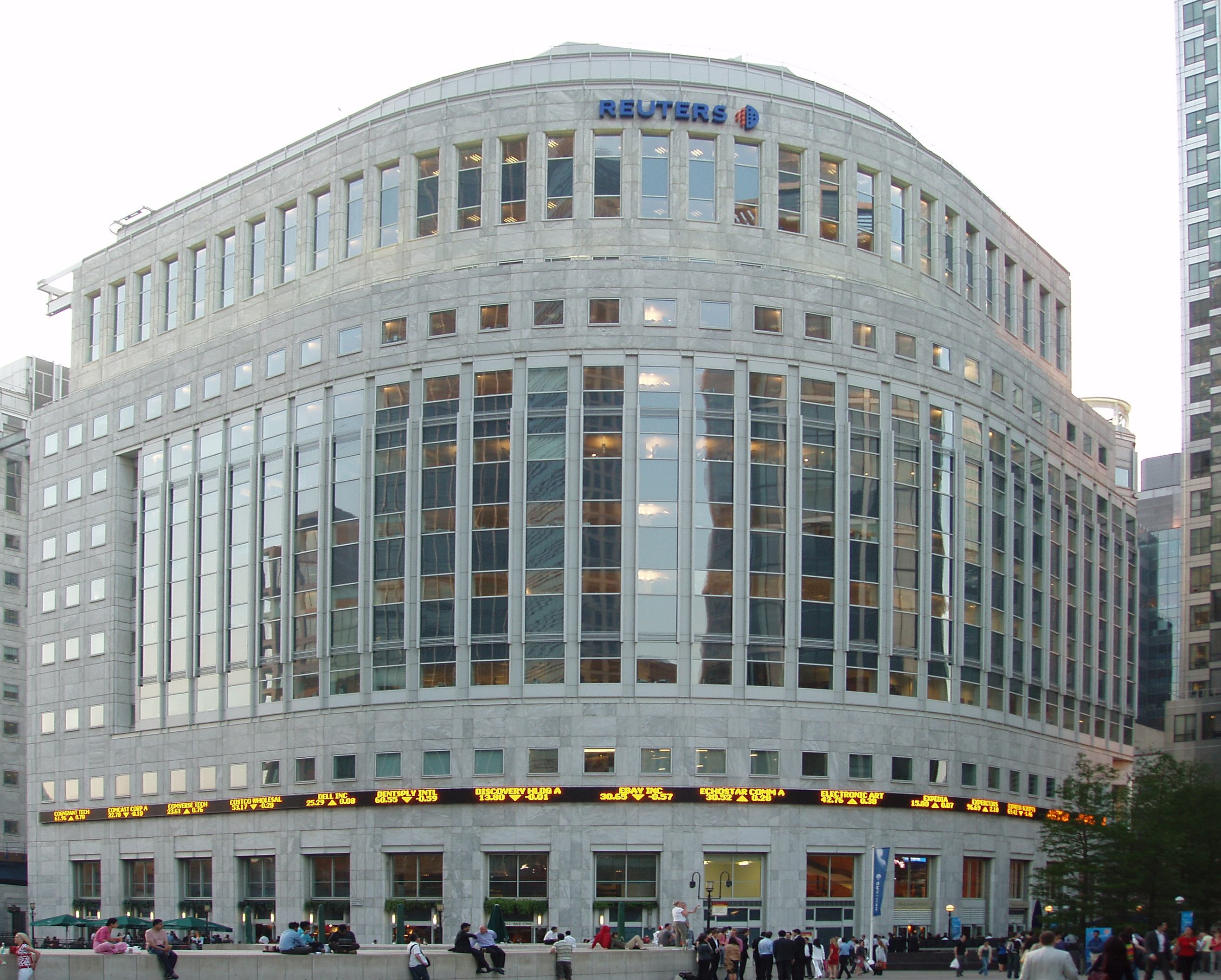
The Reuters Building in Canary Wharf, London Borough of Tower Hamlets

From 1939, corporate headquarters were in London's famous Fleet Street in a building designed by Sir Edwin Lutyens. In 2005, Reuters moved to a larger building in the more modern Canary Wharf. The Reuters Building at 30 South Colonnade is near the One Canada Square tower, Jubilee Park and Canary Wharf tube station. The open space below the Reuters building has since been renamed Reuters Plaza.

The company's North American headquarters are located in Hoboken, New Jersey. and were previously located at the Reuters Building at 3 Times Square, New York. It is on Seventh Avenue between 42nd and 43rd Streets, and was constructed from 1998 to 2001.

The Asian headquarters were located in Singapore, having moved there from Hong Kong ahead of the British handover to China in 1997 (Thomson Reuters retains offices here at ICBC Tower and Cityplaza 3). It had two offices in Singapore, one in the city centre at One Raffles Quay, and another at 18 Science Park Drive next to the National University of Singapore.
