= List of client portals =

This is a list of Client portal software. For information on the subject, see Client portal.

== Client portals ==
- Huddle
- Hyperoffice
- ShareFile
- Thomson Reuters NetClient CS
- Zoho
- Dokky.io
