= Thomson Reuters Realized Volatility Index =

Stock market index

The Thomson Reuters Realized Volatility Index is a stock market index from Thomson Reuters Indices. It measures and forecasts realized volatility at a variety of time horizons – from one day to several months.

== Function ==
This index can be used to construct volatility curves with a variety of time horizons. It can also be used to construct the skew necessary for pricing out-of-the-money options. Its forecast ability allows realized volatility to be known a few days to a month in advance. Realized volatility can be considered a more useful measure for market participants than implied volatility (IV) measures.

== History ==
The index was first introduced during the webcast The Long & Short of It – New Measures of Volatility on September 23, 2009, by Andrew Clark, Chief Index Strategist at Thomson Reuters Indices.

== See also ==
- Thomson Reuters Indices
