= Ihi (goddess) =

Mythological Tahitian goddess

Ihi is the goddess of wisdom and learning in Tahitian mythology. She is the daughter of the god Taaroa, the supreme creator god in Tahitian tradition. Ihi is associated with knowledge and intellectual pursuits and appears in accounts of Polynesian mythology.

== Records ==
Creation texts of the Society Islands were dictated between 1822 and 1833, mostly by priests and chiefs of Bora Bora and in one case by a priest on Tahiti, and were later published by Teuira Henry in Ancient Tahiti. The versions Henry recorded came chiefly from the Leeward Islands, while those published by Kenneth Emory came from the Windward Islands, most likely Tahiti.

== Mythology ==
In Henry's account Ta'aroa is the ancestor of all the gods, who made all things and had neither father nor mother. His first act was to create Hina, who is also called his daughter, and together they made the heavens, the earth and the sea. After Hina died, her spirit rose to heaven, where she took the name Hina-nui-aiai-i-te-marama and came to live in the moon. Another chant recorded by Orsmond describes Ta'aroa dwelling for ages within a closed sky, from which he conjured forth gods who were born to him in darkness.

The original shell, called Rumia, was the one out of which Ta'aroa formed the sky of the gods. Another Tahitian goddess of wisdom, Te-Meharo, appears in the creation chant, in a passage about beating fine tapa as a wrapping for the gods, naming Ta'aroa, Oro, Moe, Rua-nu'u, Tu, Toa-hiti, Tau-utu, Te-Meharo and Punua-te-fatu-tiri. Henry recorded that portions of the creation chant and mythology were recited during the great pa'i-atua ceremony.
