= MicroPatent =

MicroPatent was a subsidiary of the Thomson Corporation (now Thomson Reuters). It was a commercial source for online patent and trademark information. The service offered a searchable collection of full text patent data, including patent documents from France, Germany, Japan, the United Kingdom, the United States, the European Patent Office and the World Intellectual Property Organization.

In 2004, hacker Myron Tereshchuk attempted to extort $17 million from MicroPatent by threatening to release confidential information and launch a DDOS attack. Tereschuk was arrested by the FBI in a raid which uncovered "components for hand grenades, the formula and items necessary for making Ricin, and literature about poisons" in his possession.
