= Reuters 3000 Xtra =

Electronic trading platform

- Developer: Reuters
- Release: 1999
- Stable release: 5.1 / 2007
- Operating system: Microsoft Windows
- Type: Technical analysis software Electronic trading platform
- License: Proprietary
- Website: http://thomsonreuters.com

Reuters 3000 Xtra was an electronic trading platform which was released by Reuters in 1999 and supported until the end of 2013. It was typically used by professional traders and financial analysts in trading rooms. It was superseded by the Eikon platform, first released in 2010.

3000 Xtra provided real-time market data such as price data on exchange traded stocks, warrants, options, futures, indices, bonds, commodities and currencies, as well as streaming news and comprehensive economic indicators and financial data. Originally designed as an information system, later versions also introduced trading functions, allowing orders to be placed on a number of electronic exchanges and with other dealing desks.

The client software connected to Reuters hardware at the client's premises, which combined multiple connections to the Reuters networks over redundant, fault-tolerant dedicated links, often private T1s. This was provided on-site via a proprietary and often redundant hardware installation, such as Reuters Market Data System (RMDS) or Triarch. One of the early attractions for dealers was the integration with Microsoft Excel and the instant messaging facility for sending messages to other dealing desks. The flexible Kobra client software allowed for a variety of real-time and historic market data visualizations and custom analytics. In addition, it could provide real-time Reuters headlines and news.

It went on to become the de facto platform on traders' desks in banks and financial institutions due to the breadth of the information available, despite the significant cost and dedicated infrastructure required. Its main rival was the Bloomberg Terminal, although in many cases both systems were used.

== History ==
Quote screen showing details for the stock HSBC on Hong Kong exchange

The 3000 Xtra system was first released in 1999, but in many ways was a continuation of previous Reuters products that included Equities 2000 (released in 1987), Dealing 2000-2 (released in 1992), 3000 Series (released in 1996) and "Advanced Reuters Terminal" (released in 1986). It inherited a lot of design features such as much of the user interface from those earlier systems that were developed in the late 1980s and early 1990s.

Thomson Reuters began decommissioning Reuters 3000 Xtra in 2013, replacing it by the newer Thomson Reuters Eikon platform.

== Architecture ==
The system was designed to use private network links to Reuters to get live prices from global stock, commodity, futures, derivative and bond markets as well as foreign exchange price makers. The client terminal would connect to a local INTERACTIVE Unix server typically hosted on site by the financial institution. The server would have dedicated links back to Reuters global network. The client software was a Windows-based application. Live connection to Excel spreadsheets was provided via the Reuters Power Plus Pro utility. The system was enhanced through a number of different versions over the years. From version 5 onwards, it was qualified for Citrix thin client delivery, which became a common way to access the software.

== See also ==
- Electronic communication network
