= D2000-2 =

Foreign exchange market trading system

D2000-2 or Reuters Dealing 2000-2 was a software system designed by Reuters for foreign exchange trading that was used between 1992 and 1999.

This automated electronic trading system allowed a dealer to enter buy and/or sell prices directly into the system, thereby avoiding the need for a human broker. The system recorded the touch price which is the highest bid and lowest ask price.

== History ==
D2000-2 was released in 1992 and provided electronic matching while direct conversion was provided by D2000-1. The D2000-2 product superseded D2000 which was originally released in 1987 and only provided indicative foreign exchange prices. Much of the functionality of the system was incorporated in Reuters' subsequent online trading platform, Reuters 3000 Xtra.
