= Pangea3 =

- Company type: Subsidiary
- Industry: Legal outsourcing services Legal services Intellectual Property Services
- Founded: New York City, U.S., Mumbai, India (2004)
- Headquarters: New York City, Mumbai
- Parent: Ernst & Young
- Website: www.pangea3.com

Pangea3 is a legal outsourcing services provider with headquarters in New York City, Noida, Bangalore and Mumbai, India. Pangea3 provides legal services and intellectual property services to in-house counsel in U.S., European and Japanese corporations and attorneys in international law firms. Pangea3 has been recognized as a leading legal outsourcing services company repeatedly since 2007, was voted best LPO in the New York Law Journal Reader Rankings from 2011 through 2013 and awarded LPO of the Year by India Business Law Journal from 2009 through 2013.

Pangea3 was founded in 2004 by former Monster.com General Counsel, David Perla, and former OfficeTiger CFO and General Counsel, Sanjay Kamlani. Pangea3's legal outsourcing services are managed and run primarily by U.S., U.K. and Indian attorneys. Pangea3 provides its legal outsourcing services from its India based offices and their Dallas, TX office.

In 2005, Pangea3 opened its first office in Mumbai with 35 employees. It has since grown to 1,000 U.S., U.K. and Indian attorneys, engineers, scientists and professionals providing global legal outsourcing services in seven offices across the United States and India. In 2006, Pangea3 received $4 million in Series B funding from the venture capital firm The GlenRock Group. A year later, it closed a $7 million Series C round of funding with venture capital firm Sequoia Capital India.

In early 2008, Pangea3 opened a facility at Andheri, in Mumbai, India. Created primarily to house its expanded legal services departments, the facility expanded Pangea3's capacity to 475 worldwide. In 2010, they became part of Thomson Reuters, a provider of information to legal and business professionals. The total deal was valued at $100 million.

On June 1, 2019, Pangea3 was acquired by Ernst & Young. In February 2020, Ernst & Young laid off many of the US-based Pangea3 attorneys who had been hired by Ernst & Young as part of the acquisition from Thomson Reuters. The Ernst & Young website redirects the pangea3.com url and no longer makes any reference to Pangea3.

== Strategic alliances ==
In 2008, Pangea3 announced that it is a member of the General Counsel Roundtable's Preferred Vendor Pricing Program. Pangea3 is the first and only legal outsourcing services provider participating in this program. The General Counsel Roundtable's Preferred Vendor Pricing Program gives its members exclusive discounts on legal services from leading legal services providers. Other participating legal services companies include Serengeti, Lumen Legal and Black Letter Discovery.

== See also ==
- Legal outsourcing
- Intellectual Property
- Patent
- Outsource
- Business process outsourcing in India
- Outsourcing
- Offshoring
- Patent Attorney
