= Thomson Corporation =

Canadian information company (1989–2008)

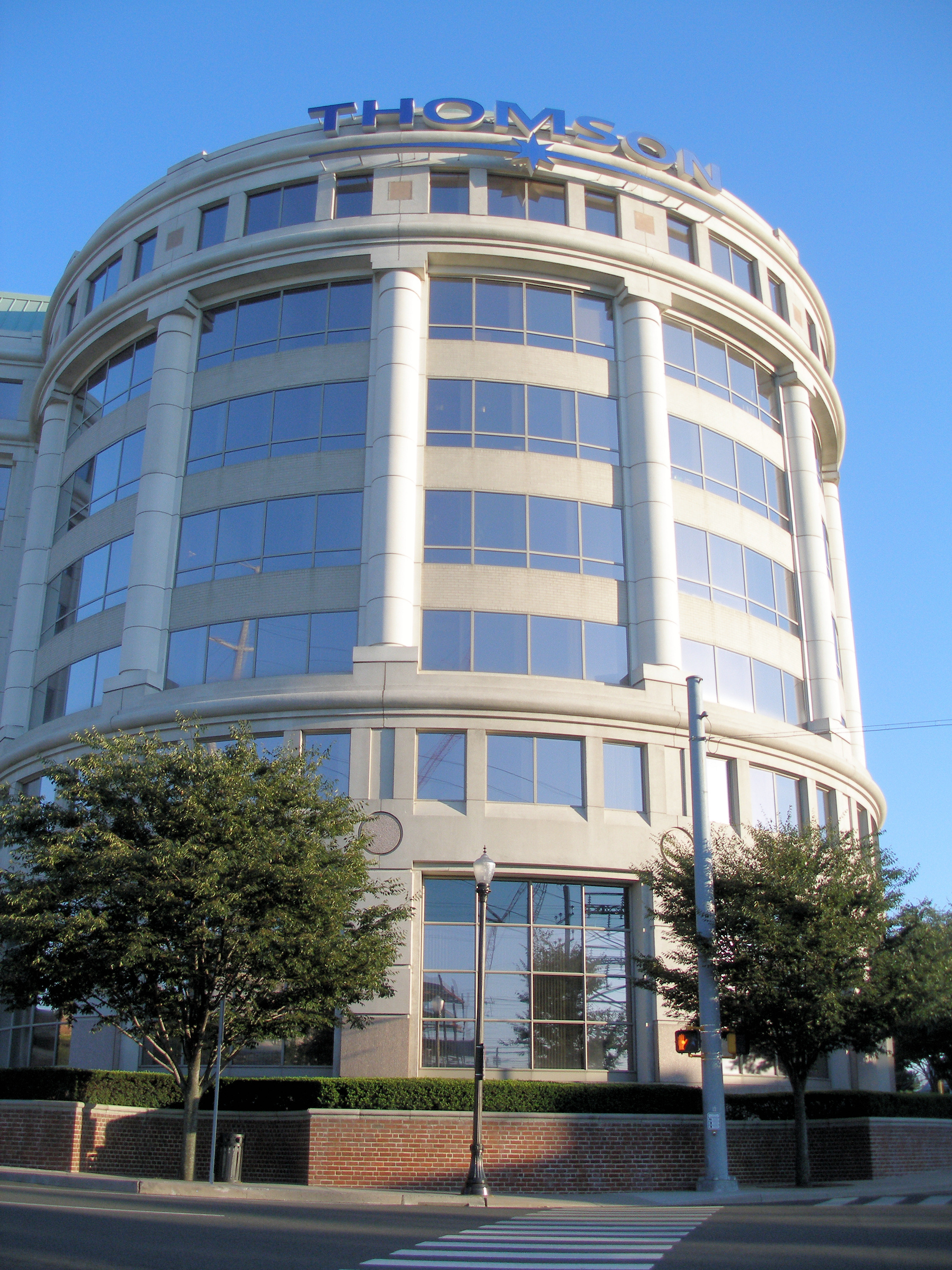
- Headquarters in Stamford, Connecticut
- Type: Public
- Traded as: TSX: TRI; NYSE: TRI
- Predecessors: International Thomson Organization; Thomson Newspapers
- Founded: 1989; 37 years ago
- Defunct: April 17, 2008; 18 years ago
- Fate: Merger with Reuters Group
- Successor: Thomson Reuters
- Headquarters: Stamford, Connecticut, U.S.
- Key people: David Thomson (chairman)
- Products: Books, publishing
- Revenue: US$6.641 billion (2006)
- Net income: US$1.120 billion (2006)
- Number of employees: 38,000
- Divisions: Thomson Financial; Thomson Scientific; Thomson Tax & Accounting; Thomson Healthcare; Thomson Legal; Thomson Learning (until 2007)

Thomson Corporation was one of the world's largest information companies. It was established in 1989 following a merger between International Thomson Organization and Thomson Newspapers. In 2008, it purchased Reuters Group to form Thomson Reuters. The Thomson Corporation was active in financial services, healthcare sectors, law, science and technology research, as well as tax and accounting sectors. The company operated through five segments (2007 onwards): Thomson Financial, Thomson Healthcare, Thomson Legal, Thomson Scientific and Thomson Tax & Accounting.

Until 2007, Thomson was also a major worldwide provider of higher education textbooks, academic information solutions and reference materials. On 26 October 2006, Thomson announced the proposed sale of its Thomson Learning assets. In May 2007, Thomson Learning was acquired by Apax Partners and subsequently renamed Cengage Learning in July. The Thomson Learning brand was used to the end of August 2007.

Subsequently, on 15 October 2007, Educational Testing Service (ETS) finalized acquisition of Thomson's Prometric. Thomson sold its global network of testing centres in 135 countries, for a reported $435 million. Prometric operates as a wholly owned subsidiary of ETS.

On 15 May 2007, the Thomson Corporation reached an agreement with Reuters to combine the two companies, a deal valued at $17.2 billion. On 17 April 2008, the new company was created under the name of Thomson Reuters. The chief executive officer of Thomson Reuters is Jim Smith, and the chairman is David Thomson, formerly of the Thomson Corporation. Although it was officially a Canadian company and remained Canadian owned, Thomson was run from its operational headquarters in Stamford, Connecticut, in the United States.

== History ==
The Thomson Corporation grew from a single Canadian newspaper, the Timmins Daily Press, acquired in 1934 by Roy Thomson (later to become 1st Baron Thomson of Fleet), into a global media concern. Thomson acquired his first non-Canadian newspaper, the Independent of St. Petersburg, Florida, in 1952. He was told by the UK Government that to qualify for a peerage, in keeping with other press barons in London, he would have to reside in the UK. Accordingly, he moved to Edinburgh and invited newspaper owners to sell to him. In this expansion in the United Kingdom the first to come forward and be bought was The Scotsman in 1953. He had no experience of television but saw the profits it made in the US and successfully founded Scottish Television in 1957, locating its headquarters and studios in the Theatre Royal, Glasgow. He founded the Thomson Organization in 1959 and acquired Kemsley Newspapers. In the 1960s, Thomson's UK publishing realm expanded to include Thomson Publication (UK), a consumer magazine and book publishing house, and The Times. By 1965, Thomson had acquired Thomas Nelson, Michael Joseph, and Hamish Hamilton. However, Thomson had to divest it majority ownership in Scottish Television. In 1965, Thomson Newspapers, Ltd. was formed as a publicly traded company in Canada.

Roy Thomson's prolific endeavours in publishing earned him the hereditary title Lord Thomson of Fleet in 1964. Thomson acquired The Times in 1966. Thomson's interests moved beyond publishing with the creation of Thomson Travel and acquisition of Britannia Airways in 1965 and 1971, and a foray into a consortium exploring the North Sea for oil and gas. Thomson used its oil profits to buy small newspapers in the United States, starting with the acquisition of Brush-Moore Newspapers in 1967 for $72 million, at the time the largest sale of newspapers. By the end of the 1970s, Thomson Newspapers' circulation in the United States had surpassed the 1 million mark. In 1974, it was rumored to be planning a takeover of Speidel Newspapers. The Thomson Organization was reorganised into the International Thomson Organization in 1978 in order to move its operating base from Britain to Canada, so that it would not be subject to British monopolies legislation, foreign‐exchange controls and dividend limitation. The International Thomson Organization and Thomson Newspapers merged in 1989, creating the Thomson Corporation. Over the years, the company has withdrawn from its holdings in the oil and gas business, the travel industry and department stores.

When Kenneth Thomson took over from his father Roy in 1976, the company was worth about $500 million. At Kenneth's death in June 2006, the company was valued at about $29.3 billion.

=== Transition to business information ===
In 1978, the acquisition of Wadsworth Publishing provided Thomson with its first entry into specialised information, college textbooks and professional books. (In 2007, Thomson Learning, including the Wadsworth imprint, was sold and renamed as Cengage Learning.) Thomson Newspapers expanded in 1980 by acquiring FP Publications, owner of The Globe and Mail. However, in 1981, Thomson sold The Times and The Sunday Times to News International. In 1985, Thomson sold its trade book division (Michael Joseph, George Rainbird, Hamish Hamilton, and Sphere) to Penguin Books.

Starting in the mid-1990s, Thomson invested further in specialised information services (but this time providing them in digital format) and began selling off its newspapers, with large sales in 1995, 1996, and 2000. David and Frederick Barclay acquired The Scotsman in 1995. That was about the time Richard J. Harrington, an accountant, became chief executive officer of the company. One of the first moves came when Thomson spent $3.4 billion to acquire the West Publishing Company, a legal information provider in Eagan, Minnesota. Thomson sold The Globe and Mail to Bell Globemedia in 2001.

In recent years, Thomson provided much of the specialised information content the world's financial, legal, research and medical organizations rely on every day to make business-critical decisions and drive innovation. While it remained a publishing company, early and aggressive investment in electronic delivery had become a key company goal. "Except for its educational division, which still publishes a substantial number of conventional textbooks, Thomson had the good fortune to move into these businesses as customers were demanding electronic delivery of their information", according to a 3 July 2006 article. "In some markets, Thomson was able to move past other players who were more cautious about digital conversion."

In 2003, the Thomson Corporation bought the Chilton automotive assets. Also in 2003, Thomson acquired the software company Elite Information Group and medical education company Gardiner-Caldwell. Also in 2003, Thomson sold its medical magazine publishing units to Advanstar Communications. Thomson also acquired the publisher Techstreet.

In 2004, Thomson acquired Tradeweb. In late 2004, the company sold its Thomson Media group to Investcorp. The B2B publishing group, which features such titles as American Banker, National Mortgage News, and The Bond Buyer, was renamed SourceMedia.

In 2005, Thomson acquired medical education company Physicians World.

In October 2006, the company confirmed it would sell the Thomson Learning market group in three parts. The first part, corporate education and training (NETg), has agreed to be sold to Skillsoft for $285 million. Apax announced its acquisition of Thomson's higher education business on 11 May 2007, for $7.5 billion in cash assets.

In 2007, Thomson sold Thomson Medical Education (including Physicians' World and Gardiner-Caldwell) to private equity firm ABRY Partners. The group was renamed KnowledgePoint360.

== Brands ==
Some of Thomson's brands are better known than the company name itself. Its brands include Thomson ONE, Westlaw, FindLaw, BARBRI, Pangea3, Physician's Desk Reference (now published digitally as the Prescriber's Digital Reference), RIA, Thomson Tax and Accounting (tax and accounting software and services for accountants), Creative Solutions, Quickfinder, DISEASEDEX (now merged with IBM Watson Health), DrugREAX, Medstat, Thomson First Call (now a subsidiary of the London Stock Exchange Group, known as Refinitiv), Checkpoint, EndNote (now produced by Clarivate, an independent company), Derwent World Patents Index (now produced by Clarivate), SAEGIS (now produced by Clarivate), MicroPatent, Aureka (now owned by Clarivate), Faxpat, OptiPat, Just Files, Faxpat, OptiPat, Just Files, Corporate Intelligence, InfoTrac (now owned by Cengage), Delphion, Arco Test Prep (now owned by Cengage), Peterson's Directories (now owned by Cengage), NewsEdge, TradeWeb, Web of Science (now produced by Clarivate) and the Arden Shakespeare (now published by Bloomsbury Publishing). Thomson formerly owned Jane's Information Group, now owned by Montagu Private Equity. These information sources are produced by the many companies of Thomson, including West Publishing, Thomson Financial, ISI (now owned by Clarivate), Thomson Gale (now owned by Cengage), Dialog Corporation (now owned by Clarivate), Brookers, Carswell, CCBN, Course Technology (now owned by Cengage), Gardiner-Caldwell, IHI, Lawbook Co, Wadsworth (now owned by Cengage), Thomson CompuMark (now owned by Clarivate) and Sweet & Maxwell.

Thomson Reuters New Zealand Limited has been publishing and updating information on New Zealand law since 1910, formerly as John Friend Ltd, to Brooker and Friend Ltd, to Brookers, to Thomson Brookers'.

Thomson had divested many of its traditional media assets – or combined them with digital products – and had moved toward a larger reliance on information technology services and products.

== Corporate governance ==
Members of the last board of directors of Thomson were as follows: David K.R. Thomson (chairman of the board since 2002), W. Geoffrey Beattie, Richard Harrington, Ron D. Barbaro, Mary Cirillo, Robert Daleo, Steven Denning, Maureen Darkes, Roger Martin, Vance Opperman, John M. Thompson, Peter Thomson, Richard Thomson and John A. Tory.

The Thomson family owned 70% of the company.

When Kenneth Thomson died in June 2006, control of the family fortune passed on to David K.R. Thomson under a plan put together decades earlier by company founder Roy Thomson.

"David, my grandson, will have to take his part in the running of the organisation and David's son, too," Roy wrote in his 1975 autobiography. "With the fortune that we will leave to them go also responsibilities. These Thomson boys that come after Ken are not going to be able, even if they want to, to shrug off these responsibilities."

The Thomson family controlled the Thomson Corporation through a family-owned entity, the Woodbridge Company, based in Toronto. (Along with 70% of Thomson Corporation, Woodbridge also owns a 40% stake in CTVglobemedia, which now owns the Globe and Mail daily newspaper in Toronto and CTV, Canada's largest commercial TV network.) David K.R. Thomson and his brother, Peter Thomson, became co-chairmen of Woodbridge after their father's death.
