= International Thomson Organization =

Canadian conglomerate (1978–1989)

- Industry: Holding company
- Predecessor: Thomson Organization
- Founded: 1978; 48 years ago
- Defunct: 1989; 37 years ago
- Fate: Merged with Thomson Newspapers
- Successor: Thomson Corporation

International Thomson Organization (ITO) was a Canadian holding company that was active from 1978 to 1989, with interests in publishing, travel, and natural resources. It was created as a part of a corporate restructuring of the Thomson Organization, originally founded by Roy Thomson, 1st Baron Thomson of Fleet in 1959, which included among others, ownership of The Times newspaper (later sold from the company in 1981). It merged with Thomson Newspapers to become the Thomson Corporation in 1989.

== History ==
ITO was formed in 1978 to serve as the new corporate parent for Thomson's global operations. This coincided with the relocation of its operating base from Britain to Canada, so that it would not be subject to British monopolies legislation, foreign-exchange controls and dividend limitation.

Under Roy Thomson's son Kenneth Thomson, ITO sold its natural resources and continued expanding in publishing and media.

In 1980, Thomson acquired Jane's, a publishing company specializing in military intelligence. In 1981, it acquired the publishing operations of Litton Industries, including the Physicians' Desk Reference. On 12 February 1981, following a period of industrial disputes which could not be resolved, the company decided to sell The Times newspaper to Rupert Murdoch.

By 1986, International Thomson had acquired business publisher Warren, Gorham & Lamont; legal publishers Callaghan & Company and Clark Boardman; and automotive publishers Ward's. Other publishers acquired include Gale, Mitchell, and Thomson & Thomson. In 1988, ITO acquired the British company Associated Book Publishers, which included Sweet & Maxwell, Chapman & Hall, The Law Book Company of Australasia, and Routledge. In 1989, ITO acquired Lawyers Cooperative Publishing, including subsidiaries Bancroft-Whitney and Research Institute of America. In 1995, International Thomson Publishing acquired Ventana Communications Group, a publisher specializing in technology books.
