= Physicians' Desk Reference =

Compilation of prescribing information for prescription drugs

- Cover page of the 21st edition
- Publisher: ConnectiveRx
- Publication date: 1947

The Physicians' Desk Reference (PDR), renamed Prescriber's Digital Reference after its physical publication was discontinued, is a compilation of manufacturers' prescribing information (package insert) on prescription drugs, updated regularly and published by ConnectiveRx.

== History ==
The original PDR was titled Physicians' Desk Reference but was renamed because not all prescribers are physicians and the reference is no longer a hardback book used on a desk. While marketed as a means of providing physicians with the full legally mandated information relevant to writing prescriptions, it was widely available in libraries and bookstores, was widely used by other medical specialists, and was sometimes valuable to the layman. The book was distributed for free to all licensed medical doctors in America; only drugs which drug manufacturers paid to appear, appeared in the PDR, and no generic drugs were listed.

The 71st Edition, published in 2017, was the final hardcover edition, weighed in at 4.6 pounds (2.1 kg) and contained information on over 1,000 drugs. Since then, the PDR has been available online for free.

The Physicians' Desk Reference was first published in 1947 by Medical Economics Inc., a magazine publisher founded by Lansing Chapman. Medical Economics Inc. merged with Reinhold Publishing in 1966 to form Chapman-Reinhold. Litton Industries, which owned the American Book Company, acquired Chapman-Reinhold in 1968. Litton sold its publishing business to the International Thomson Organization (ITO) in 1981.

ITO successor Thomson Reuters sold the Physicians' Desk Reference to Lee Equity Partners in 2009; Lee formed the new parent company PDR Network. Lee sold PDR Network to Genstar Capital in 2015. Genstar merged PDR Network into the new company ConnectiveRx.

== About the PDR ==
The PDR material contained includes:

- Comprehensive indexing (four sections)
  - by Manufacturer
  - Products (by company's or trademarked drug name)
  - Category index (for example, "antibiotics")
  - Generic/chemical index (non-trademark common drug names)
- Color images of medications
- Product information, consistent with FDA labeling
  - Chemical information
  - Function/action
  - Indications & Contraindications
  - Trial research, side effects, warnings

== Related references ==
The PDR has several versions and related volumes:

- PDR
- PDR for Nonprescription Drugs, Dietary Supplements, and Herbs
- PDR Drug Interactions and Side Effects Index
- PDRhealth—Version in lay terms.
- PDR Family Guide to Over-the-Counter Drugs—Lay term guide to non-prescription medication.
- PDR for Ophthalmic Medicines
- PDR Drug Guide for Mental Health Professionals
- PDR for Herbal Medicines
