= Thomson Reuters =

Canadian multinational information conglomerate

Thomson Reuters Corporation

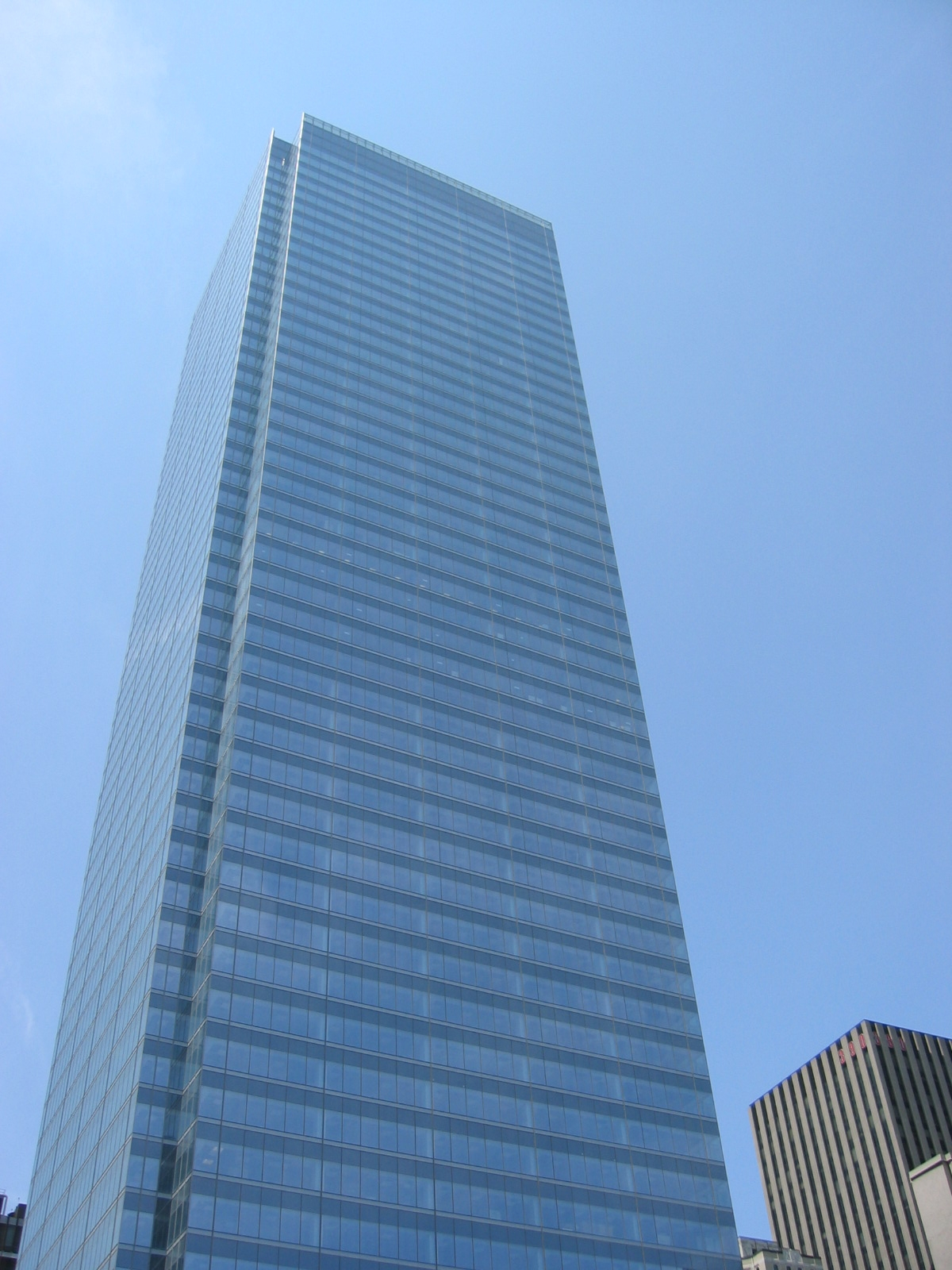
- Office at Bay Adelaide Centre, Toronto
- Type: Public
- Traded as: TSX: TRI; S&P/TSX 60 component; Nasdaq: TRI; Nasdaq-100 component
- Industry: Mass media
- Predecessors: Thomson Corporation; Reuters Group
- Founded: 17 April 2008; 18 years ago
- Headquarters: Toronto, Ontario, Canada
- Area served: Worldwide
- Key people: David Thomson (chairman); Steve Hasker (president and CEO)
- Revenue: ▲US$7.48 billion (2025)
- Operating income: ▲US$2.13 billion (2025)
- Net income: ▼US$1.50 billion (2025)
- Total assets: ▼US$17.9 billion (2025)
- Total equity: ▼US$11.9 billion (2025)
- Owner: The Woodbridge Company (67.1%)
- Number of employees: 27,100 (2025)
- Divisions: Reuters; Openly; Context
- Subsidiaries: West
- Website: www.thomsonreuters.com

Thomson Reuters Corporation (/ˈrɔɪtərz/ ROY-tərz) is a Canadian multinational content-driven technology conglomerate. The company was founded in Toronto, Ontario, and maintains its headquarters in the city at 19 Duncan Street.

Thomson Reuters was created by the Thomson Corporation's purchase of the British company Reuters Group on 17 April 2008. It is majority-owned by the Woodbridge Company, a holding company for the Thomson family of Canada.

== History ==
=== Thomson Corporation ===
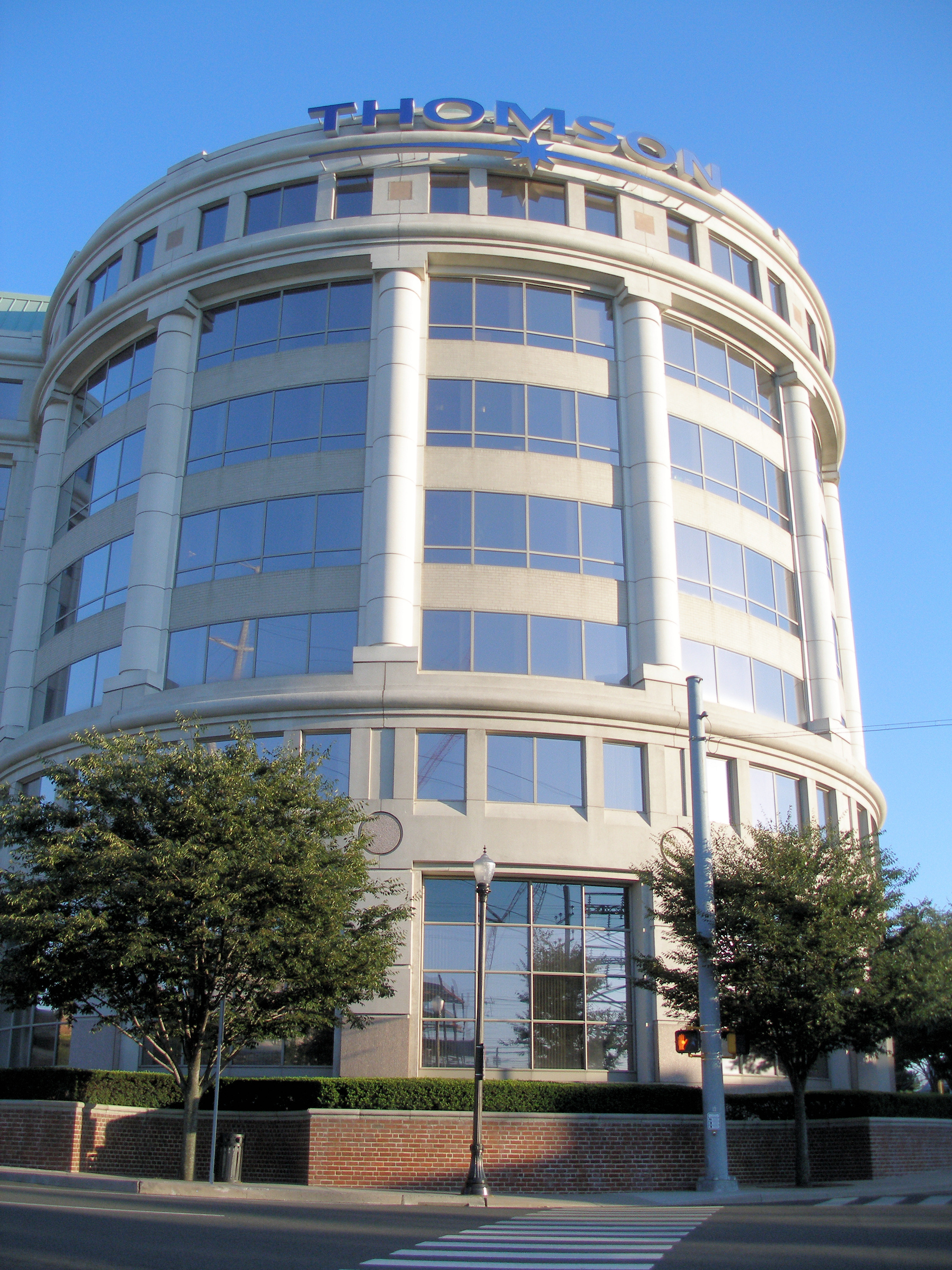
Thomson Reuters Building in Downtown Stamford, Connecticut. The office previously served as the world headquarters for Thomson Corporation.

The forerunner of the Thomson company was founded in 1934 by Roy Thomson in Ontario as the publisher of The Timmins Daily Press. In 1953, Thomson acquired the Scotsman newspaper and moved to Scotland the following year. He consolidated his media position in Scotland in 1957, when he won the franchise for Scottish Television. In 1959, he bought the Kemsley Group, a purchase that eventually gave him control of the Sunday Times. He separately acquired the Times in 1967. He moved into the airline business in 1965, when he acquired Britannia Airways, and into oil and gas exploration in 1971, when he participated in a consortium to exploit reserves in the North Sea. Following the death of Thomson, the company withdrew from national newspapers and broadcast media, selling the Times and the Sunday Times to Rupert Murdoch's News International in 1981, and instead moved into publishing, buying Sweet & Maxwell in 1988. The company at this time was known as the International Thomson Organization Ltd (ITOL).

In 1989, ITOL merged with Thomson Newspapers, forming the Thomson Corporation. In 1996, the Thomson Corporation acquired West Publishing, a purveyor of legal research and services (including Westlaw).

=== Reuters Group ===
The company was founded in 1851 by Paul Julius Reuter in London as a business transmitting stock market quotations. Reuter set up his "Submarine Telegraph" office in October 1851 and negotiated a contract with the London Stock Exchange to provide stock prices from the continental exchanges in return for access to London prices, which he then supplied to stockbrokers in Paris. In 1865, Reuters in London was the first organization to report the assassination of Abraham Lincoln. The company was involved in developing the use of radio in 1923. It was acquired by the British National & Provincial Press in 1941, and it first listed on the London Stock Exchange in 1984. Reuters began to grow rapidly in the 1980s, widening the range of its business products and expanding its global reporting network for media, financial and economic services. Key product launches included Equities 2000 (1987), Dealing 2000-2 (1992), Business Briefing (1994), Reuters Television for the financial markets (1994), 3000 Series (1996) and the Reuters 3000 Xtra service (1999).

=== Thomson acquisition of Reuters ===
The Thomson Corporation acquired Reuters Group plc to form Thomson Reuters on 17 April 2008. Thomson Reuters operated under a dual-listed company ("DLC") structure and had two parent companies, both of which were publicly listed, Thomson Reuters Corporation and Thomson Reuters plc. In 2009, it unified its dual-listed company structure and stopped its listing on the London Stock Exchange and NASDAQ. As of October 2022, it was listed only as Thomson Reuters Corporation on the New York Stock Exchange and Toronto Stock Exchange (symbol: TRI). On 13 February 2025, the company announced that it would switch its US stock listing to the Nasdaq Global Select Market later that month. The company ceased trading on the NYSE at market close on 24 February 2025, and commenced trading as a Nasdaq-listed security on 25 February 2025. Thomson Reuters was added to the Nasdaq-100 index on 28 July 2025 at the stock market open.

Thomson Reuters was ranked first in Interbrand's 2010 ranking of Canadian corporate brands.

In February 2013, Thomson Reuters announced it would cut 2,500 jobs to cut costs in its legal, financial and risk divisions. In October 2013, Thomson Reuters announced it would cut another 3,000 jobs, mostly in those same three divisions.

=== Market position and Thomson Reuters merger antitrust review ===
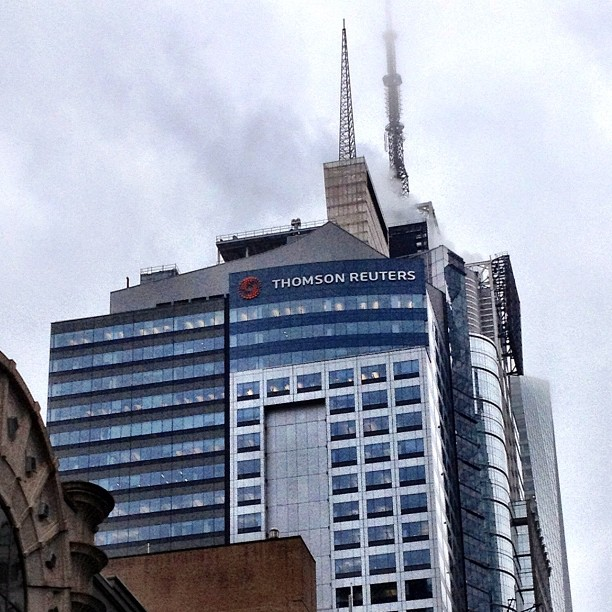
Thomson Reuters Building as seen from Eighth Avenue in Midtown Manhattan

The Thomson-Reuters merger transaction was reviewed by the U.S. Department of Justice and by the European Commission. On 19 February 2008, both the Department of Justice and the Commission cleared the transaction subject to minor divestments. The Department of Justice required the parties to sell copies of the data contained in the following products: Thomson's WorldScope, a global fundamentals product; Reuters Estimates, an earnings estimates product; and Reuters Aftermarket (Embargoed) Research Database, an analyst research distribution product. The proposed settlement further requires the licensing of related intellectual property, access to personnel, and transitional support to ensure that the buyer of each set of data can continue to update its database so as to continue to offer users a viable and competitive product. The European Commission imposed similar divestments: according to the commission's press release, "the parties committed to divest the databases containing the content sets of such financial information products, together with relevant assets, personnel and customer base as appropriate to allow purchasers of the databases and assets to quickly establish themselves as a credible competitive force in the marketplace in competition with the merged entity, re-establishing the pre-merger rivalry in the respective fields."

These remedies were viewed as very minor given the scope of the transaction. According to the Financial Times, "the remedy proposed by the competition authorities will affect no more than $25m of the new Thomson Reuters group's $13bn-plus combined revenues."

The transaction was cleared by the Canadian Competition Bureau.

In November 2009, the European Commission opened formal antitrust proceedings against Thomson Reuters concerning a potential infringement of the EC Treaty's rules on abuse of a dominant market position (Article 82). The Commission investigated Thomson Reuters' practices in the area of real-time market datafeeds, and particularly, whether customers or competitors were prevented from translating Reuters Instrument Codes (RICs) to alternative identification codes of other datafeed suppliers (so-called 'mapping') to the detriment of competition. In December 2012, the European Commission adopted a decision that renders legally binding the commitments offered by Thomson Reuters to create a new licence ("ERL") allowing customers, for a monthly fee, to use Reuters Instrument Codes (RICs) in applications for data sourced from Thomson Reuters' real time consolidated datafeed competitors to which they have moved.

=== Reuters purchase process ===
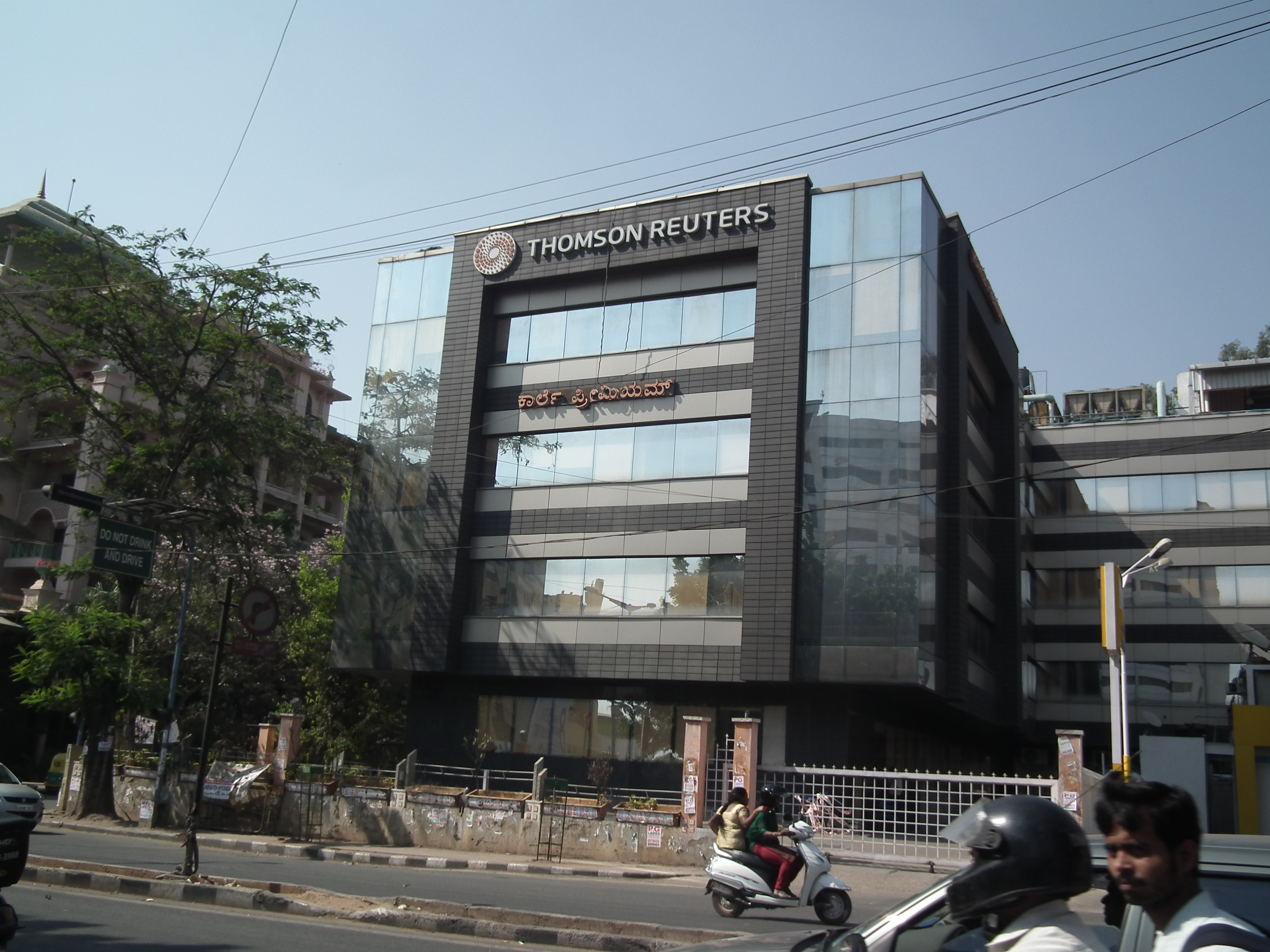
Bengaluru building on the Old Airport Road

Historically, no single individual has been permitted to own more than 15% of Reuters, under the first of the Reuters Principles, which states, "Reuters shall at no time pass into the hands of any one interest, group or faction." However, that restriction was waived for the purchase by Thomson, whose family holding company, the Woodbridge Company currently owns 53% of the enlarged business. Robert Peston, business editor at BBC News, stated that this has worried Reuters journalists, both because they are concerned that Reuters' journalism business will be marginalized by the financial data provision business of the combined company, and because of the threat to Reuters's reputation for unbiased journalism by the appearance of one majority shareholder.

Pehr Gyllenhammar, Chairman of the Reuters Founders Share Company, explained that the Reuters Trust's First Principle had been waived for the Thomson family because of the poor financial circumstances that Reuters had been in, stating, "The future of Reuters takes precedence over the principles. If Reuters were not strong enough to continue on its own, the principles would have no meaning." He stated, not having met David Thomson but having discussed the matter with Geoff Beattie, the president of Woodbridge, that the Thomson family had agreed to vote as directed by the Reuters Founders Share Company on any matter that the trustees might deem to threaten the five principles of the Reuters Trust. Woodbridge will be allowed an exemption from the First Principle as long as it remains controlled by the Thomson family.

== Commercial products and activities ==
=== Operations ===
The chief executive of the combined company is Steve Hasker, who was the chief executive for the professional division, and the chairman is David Thomson.

In 2018, the company was organized around four divisions: Legal, Reuters News Agency, Tax & Accounting, and Government.Former divisions: Intellectual Property & Science, Financial & Risk, Thomson Healthcare, and Scholarly & Scientific Research. As of 2018, the Financial & Risk division makes for over half of the company's revenue.

Thomson Reuters competes with Bloomberg L.P., in aggregating financial and legal news.Thomson Reuters subscriptions compete with open access alternatives, accessible through open data and open source aggregators such as Unpaywall, which can help counter the increase in subscription costs (+779% in the 1995–2015 period vs. 58% for the consumer price index).

On 24 February 2026, Thomson Reuters said its artificial intelligence-powered assistant for businesses, CoCounsel, has drawn one million users which eased fears of disruption by competing AI tools. This resulted in shares to jump by more than 11 per cent on the day.

In March 2026, it was announced that Thomson Reuters partnered with Smokeball to integrate their AI assistant, CoCounsel, into Smokeball's legal practice management software.

=== Thomson Reuters v. Ross Intelligence ===
In September 2026, the United States Court of Appeals for the Third Circuit affirmed a ruling in favor of Thomson Reuters in its copyright lawsuit against Ross Intelligence, a now-defunct legal research company. Ross had used material from Westlaw, including editorial headnotes summarizing legal principles, to develop a competing AI-assisted legal research service. The court rejected Ross's fair-use defense, finding that its use of the material was not transformative, and upheld the copyrightability of the headnotes. The court distinguished the case from litigation concerning generative AI systems.

== Merative ==
In 2012, Thomson Reuters sold its Healthcare division to Veritas Capital, who renamed the business Truven Health Analytics. IBM Corporation acquired Truven Health Analytics on 18 February 2016, and merged it with IBM's Watson Health unit. On 30 June 2022, Francisco Partners announced the completion of acquiring Watson Health and launched a healthcare data company named Merative.

== Clarivate ==
Clarivate was formerly the Intellectual Property and Science division of Thomson Reuters. Before 2008, it was known as Thomson Scientific. In 2016, Thomson Reuters struck a $3.55 billion deal in which they spun it off as an independent company, and sold it to private-equity firms Onex Corporation and Baring Private Equity Asia.

=== Acquisitions and divestitures ===
==== 1998 – 2010 ====
In 1998, Reuters Group plc acquired Lipper Analytical as a wholly owned subsidiary. Lipper became part of Thomson Reuters in April 2008, following the merger of Thomson Financial and Reuters. (The Lipper Fiduciary Services and Lipper FMI was purchased by Broadridge Financial Solutions in May 2015.)

The company has completed over 200 acquisitions between 2008 and 2018.

In 2009, Thomas Reuters acquired numerous companies, including data mining provider Streamlogics, tick data company Vhayu Technologies, European PR distribution group Hugin Group, Breaking Views, and Deloitte's Abacus corporate taxation software. That year, the company also sold the Physician's Desk Reference to Lee Equity Partners.

In 2010, Thomas Reuters acquired Discovery Logic, Aegisoft LLC (allowing them to offer direct market access), Super Lawyers, Norwegian trading analytics company Point Carbon A/S, and Brazilian legal publisher Revista dos Tribunais. Acquisitions in the second half of the year included Complinet, Seregenti Law, Pangea3, GeneGo, and Highline Financial.

==== 2011 – 2012 ====
On 20 June 2011, Thomson Reuters acquired CorpSmart from Deloitte. On 18 July 2011, it acquired Manatron from Thoma Bravo. In August, Thomson Reuters acquired GFMS. On 8 December 2011, Thomson Reuters acquired Emochila, a website development firm founded by Chad Brubaker and Justin Curzi in the tax and accounting space, in order to further integrate its CS suite of products onto a cloud-based platform.

In January 2012, Thomson Reuters acquired Dr Tax, which, according to its press release, was "Canada's largest independently owned developer of income tax software for accounting firms and consumers." Dr Tax's products includes DT MAX, a tax compliance software for accounting firms, and its consumer tax preparation software, UFile and ImpôtExpert.

In February, the company acquired RedEgg, a provider of media intelligence services for public relations and marketing professionals. On 22 March, it acquired BizActions, a digital newsletter and Web marketing providers for accounting firms in North America.

On 8 June 2012, Apsmart, a London-based company specializing in design and development of mobile services, became the next organization to be acquired. On 25 June 2012, Reuters obtained Zawya Limited, a regional provider of business intelligence and unique tools for financial professionals in the Middle East and North Africa.

On 10 July 2012, Thomson Reuters acquired FX Alliance Inc, an independent provider of electronic foreign exchange trading services to corporations and asset managers. In July 2012, Thomson Reuters also acquired Dofiscal. On 26 July 2012, Thomson Reuters announced acquisition of MarkMonitor, a San Francisco-based company specializing in internet brand protection software and services.

==== 2013 ====
On 3 January 2013, Thomson announced that it was to acquire Practical Law Company, the London-based provider of practical legal know-how and workflow tools to law firms and corporate law departments. Practical Law Company has more than 750 employees, with principal operations in London and New York, and will be part of the Legal business of Thomson Reuters.

On 16 April 2013, Thomson Reuters acquired Select TaxWorks Assets of RedGear Technologies. On 6 June 2013, Thomson Reuters acquired Pricing Partners, a provider of OTC Derivatives Pricing Analytics and independent valuation. On 2 July 2013, Thomson Reuters acquired the foreign exchange options business of Tradeweb.

On 16 August 2013, Thomson Reuters acquired the foreign exchange options risk management technology provider SigmaGenix. On 18 August 2013, Thomson Reuters acquired a majority stake in Omnesys Technologies and acquired completely the company on 16 September 2013 In August 2013, it also acquired WeComply.

On 10 September 2013, Thomson Reuters acquired the CPE, the CPA Division of Bisk Education Inc, and Kortes. On 23 October 2013, Thomson Reuters acquired Entagen, acquiring the Cortellis family of products for drug pipeline, deals, patents, and company content. On 10 December 2013, Thomson Reuters acquired Avedas.

==== 2014 – 2016 ====
In February 2014, Thomson Reuters acquired Brazil's Domínio Sistemas, a company focused on developing accounting services. On 1 July 2014, Thomson Reuters acquired UBS Convertible Indices. In October 2014, Thomson Reuters sold its PE/VC media assets (including PEHub and Venture Capital Journal) to UCG.

In January 2015, Thomson Reuters acquired K'Origin. In September 2015, Thomson Reuters acquired Business Integrity Ltd.

In April 2016, Thomson Reuters acquired Wm Reuters Foreign Exchange benchmarks from State Street Corporation. In July 2016, Thomson Reuters announced it would be selling its Intellectual Property and Science business (including Web of Science, MarkMonitor and EndNote) to private equity funds; the newly independent business is Clarivate Analytics.

==== 2017 – 2019 ====
In January 2017, Thomson Reuters acquired REDI allowing Thomson Reuters to incorporate an advanced, cross-asset execution management system (EMS) into its buy-side trading capabilities and deliver integrated trading workflow services to the buy-side community. In March 2017, Thomson Reuters acquired the Avox and Clarient businesses from DTCC.

In January 2018, Thomson Reuters announced it was divesting its financial and risk unit to U.S. private equity firm, the Blackstone Group. Thomson Reuters will retain 45% of the divested unit, keep the Reuters brand, and will continue to deliver Reuters news and editorial content to the new divested unit. The joint venture is branded as Refinitiv. David Thomson was said to oppose the deal. The transaction was approved by the EU commission on 23 July 2018. The Lipper Fund Awards, retained from the company's 1998 acquisition of Lipper Analytical, also transferred from Reuters to Refinitiv.

In October 2018, Thomson Reuters announced the future acquisition of Integration Point, a global trade management (GTM) operations company. In November 2019, the company acquired global legal market research analyst firm Acritas.

==== 2020s ====
In April 2022, Thomson Reuters acquired Gestta Technology Ltda, an accounting automation software, formerly part of the Redspark Group. On 11 November 2022, Thomson Reuters announced that it had reached a definitive agreement to acquire SurePrep for $500 million in cash.

On 3 January 2023, Thomson Reuters acquired SurePrep, a US-based leader in 1040 tax automation software and services. In June 2023, Thomson Reuters agreed to acquire Casetext, a provider of AI technology for legal professionals, in an all-cash deal worth $650 million. The acquisition was completed in August 2023.

In October 2024, Thomson Reuters announced it was selling its FindLaw business to Internet Brands for an unknown amount.

In January 2025, Thomson Reuters acquired U.S. tax filing software SafeSend for $600M.

In July 2026, Thomson Reuters agreed to sell a 51% stake in its Global Print business to KKR for approximately US$500 million, forming a joint venture in which Thomson Reuters would retain a 49% interest. Thomson Reuters would also retain its intellectual-property rights and editorial control over the content distributed by the venture. The transaction was expected to close during the fourth quarter of 2026.

=== Sponsorships ===
Thomson Reuters has sponsored Canadian golf champion Mike Weir and the Williams Grand Prix Engineering Formula One team. It also sponsors Marketplace, a radio show from American Public Media.

Thomson Reuters, among other media corporations, also donated hundreds of thousands of dollars to the Clinton Foundation.

== Involvement in mass surveillance ==
Thomson Reuters owns and operates the Consolidated Lead Evaluation and Reporting (CLEAR) database, which scrapes personal and identifying data for use in law enforcement, corporate security, and fraud investigations. Per the company's marketing, CLEAR compiles public records, phone records, utility records, social media information, credit history, motor vehicle registration data, and automatic license plate reader scans to create files on its subjects. CLEAR has been the subject of numerous lawsuits alleging invasions of privacy and other violations of civil liberties.

In November 2019, two groups of legal scholars and human rights activists called on Thomson Reuters to cease providing U.S. Immigration and Customs Enforcement and Palantir Technologies access to information through CLEAR, which has enabled the deportation of illegal immigrants. A company representative replied that Thomson Reuters will help the American government and police in active criminal investigations and against threats to national security or public safety. In February 2020, a group of Thomson Reuters shareholders criticized the company's involvement with ICE for immigrant tracking. Shareholder British Columbia General Employees' Union raised concerns again in 2026 and proposed an independent evaluation on the negative impacts of CLEAR for human rights, which was denied by the board of directors due to a pending assessment from 2025.

In 2025, 180 employees sent leadership a signed letter expressing their concerns with the company's contracts with ICE and DHS. The employee organizing efforts for the letter was later fired.

In 2020, three Reuters investigative journalists, Raphael Satter, Christopher Bing and Jack Stubbs, who were conducting an investigation about a hack-for-hire company based in India, forcefully took a photograph of Kumar, a small scale Indian herbal businessman, for alleged hacker Sumit Gupta of Belltrox. Despite providing identification showing he was not the alleged hacker, Kumar's image was used by one of the three journalists in their story. As a result, the businessman was questioned by the police, suffered reputation damage and business loss, and later relocated to a small town. Reuters later admitted to an error of mistaken identity caused by the businessman's sharing of same address with the alleged hacker.

== See also ==
- Companies listed on the Toronto Stock Exchange (T)
- Dual-listed company – Corporate structure type
- List of client portals
- List of companies based in New York City
- List of companies named after people
- List of news agencies
- Software industry in Telangana – Software industry in the Indian state of Telangana

Related

- Thomson Reuters Business Classification
- Thomson Reuters Citation Laureates
- Thomson Reuters Foundation – London-based charitable arm of Thomson Reuters
- Thomson Reuters Indices
- Thomson Reuters league tables
- Thomson Reuters Messenger – Professional Instant messaging client
- Thomson Reuters Realized Volatility Index – Stock market index
- Thomson Reuters/CoreCommodity CRB Index
