= List of Canadians by net worth =

The following list of Canadians by net worth includes the wealthiest Canadian individuals and families as determined by the Bloomberg Billionaires Index and The World's Billionaires by Forbes. In addition to Bloomberg and Forbes, some other organizations and publications also measure the wealth of high net-worth individuals and families.

== List of Canadians by net worth ==
Several publications have produced listings of the world's wealthiest people by net worth, including Bloomberg and Forbes. However, there are differences between these listings, with the number of billionaires that exist, as well as their estimated net worth.

According to Canadian Business, in November 2017 there were at least 100 Canadian billionaires when using the Canadian dollar to evaluate net worth. This number differs from The World's Billionaires by Forbes, and the Bloomberg Billionaires Index, as they both use the United States dollar to evaluate net worth. Publications may also provide different estimates for an individual's net worth, leading to disagreement between the publications.

Several Canadian individuals/families that hold multiple citizenships and have a net worth exceeding C$1 billion may also not be listed as Canadians by the aforementioned publications. For example, Elon Musk, considered to be the richest person in the world in 2021, holds multiple citizenships, including Canadian citizenship; (Note: Elon Musk holds citizenship from Canada, South Africa, and the United States.) although Bloomberg and Forbes' listing of billionaires list Musk as an American.

=== Bloomberg ===
Bloomberg L.P. maintains a daily ranking of the net worth analysis of the world's richest people in the world on the Bloomberg Billionaires Index, which is updated "at the close of every trading day in New York", with the Top 500 provided online each day. The individual results are also published on the profile page of each billionaire. Bloomberg's listing only evaluates the net worth of individuals.

The following is a list of the wealthiest individuals, in the world's Top 500, with "Canada" listed as their "Country/Region" according to Bloomberg's daily listing, the Bloomberg Billionaires Index, as of 20 November 2026.

List of wealthiest Canadians (Bloomberg, 20 November 2026) (Note: The list only includes individuals that were categorized as Canadians by the publication.)
World rank	Canadian rank	Name	Net worth (USD)	Industry
29	1	Changpeng Zhao	$60.9 billion	Finance
102	2	Galen Weston	$23.0 billion	Retail
158	3	Sherry Brydson (Note: Member of the Thomson family: Brydson holds a roughly 23% stake in the family's The Woodbridge Company, while her three cousins, the siblings David, Taylor and Peter, hold a roughly 14% stake each, and her other three cousins, the siblings Linda, Susan (died 2017, stake bequeathed to her four children) and Gaye, hold a roughly 11% stake each.)	$17.3 billion	Media & Telecom
198	4	David Cheriton	$14.9 billion	Technology
220	5	Ilya Sutskever	$13.8 billion	Technology
232	6	Stuart Hoegner	$13.4 billion	Finance
282	7	David Thomson	$11.9 billion	Media & Telecom
316	8	Tobi Lütke	$11.0 billion	Technology
335	9	Taylor Thomson	$10.6 billion	Media & Telecom
336	10	Peter Thomson	$10.6 billion	Media & Telecom
369	11	Joseph Tsai	$9.90 billion	Technology
447	12	Linda Campbell	$8.32 billion	Media & Telecom
448	13	Gaye Farncombe	$8.32 billion	Media & Telecom
474	14	Alain Bouchard	$7.65 billion	Retail
Total			$222 billion	

=== Forbes ===
Forbes magazine's annual listing of billionaires entitled The World's Billionaires is based on March 1, 2026, "stock prices and exchange rates" in US dollars. They collaborate with FactSet Research Systems, Orbis, PitchBook Data, Real Capital Analytics, Reonomy, S&P Capital IQ, and VesselsValue to collect data.

Forbes will typically list individuals rather than multigenerational families with shared wealth, although their listing will consolidate the wealth belonging to a billionaire's spouse and children if that person is the founder of the fortune.

The following is a list of the wealthiest Canadian individuals and families according to the Forbes' annual The World's Billionaires listing for 2026.

List of wealthiest Canadians (Forbes, 2026)
World rank	Canadian rank	Name	Net worth (USD)	Industry
17	1	Changpeng Zhao	$110 billion	Finance & Investments
104	2	Stuart Hoegner	$24.7 billion	Finance & Investments
223	3	Joseph Tsai	$13.3 billion	Technology
255	4	Jim Pattison	$12 billion	Diversified
275	5	Sherry Brydson	$11.5 billion	Media & Entertainment
302	6	Tobi Lutke	$10.7 billion	Technology
353	7	David Cheriton	$9.8 billion	Technology
461	8	Alain Bouchard	$7.9 billion	Fashion & Retail
461	9	Ling Tang	$7.9 billion	Technology
487	10	Peter Gilgan	$7.7 billion	Construction & Engineering
498	11	Daniel Nadler	$7.6 billion	Technology
542	12	Daryl Katz	$7.2 billion	Diversified
567	13	Christopher Olah	$7 billion	Technology
567	14	Stephen Smith	$7 billion	Finance & Investments
567	15	David Thomson	$7 billion	Media & Entertainment
567	16	Peter Thomson	$7 billion	Media & Entertainment
567	17	Taylor Thomson	$7 billion	Media & Entertainment
612	18	Bruce Flatt	$6.7 billion	Finance & Investments
645	19	Chip Wilson	$6.5 billion	Fashion & Retail
653	20	Emanuele (Lino) Saputo	$6.4 billion	Food & Beverage
694	21	Mark Scheinberg	$6 billion	Gambling & Casinos
720	22	Leonid Boguslavsky	$5.8 billion	Finance & Investments
730	23	Anthony Mandl	$5.7 billion	Food & Beverage
749	24	Bob Gaglardi	$5.6 billion	Real Estate
762	25	Linda Campbell	$5.5 billion	Media & Entertainment
762	26	Gaye Farncombe	$5.5 billion	Media & Entertainment
852	27	Garrett Camp	$5 billion	Technology
852	28	Ryan Cohen	$5 billion	Finance & Investments
908	29	N. Murray Edwards	$4.7 billion	Energy
934	30	Eric Sprott	$4.6 billion	Finance & Investments
954	31	Carlo Fidani	$4.5 billion	Real Estate
1,108	32	Stephen Jarislowsky	$3.9 billion	Finance & Investments
1,137	33	Lawrence Stroll	$3.8 billion	Fashion & Retail
1,163	34	Jean Couto	$3.7 billion	Fashion & Retail
1,163	35	Jacques D'Amours	$3.7 billion	Fashion & Retail
1,189	36	Barry Zekelman	$3.6 billion	Manufacturing
1,223	37	Jack Cockwell	$3.5 billion	Finance & Investments
1,223	38	Michael Latifi	$3.5 billion	Food & Beverage
1,223	39	Zhang Ning	$3.5 billion	Manufacturing
1,251	40	Pierre Karl Péladeau	$3.4 billion	Media & Entertainment
1,440	41	Naomi Azrieli	$2.9 billion	Real Estate
1,440	42	Sharon Azrieli	$2.9 billion	Real Estate
1,440	43	Mitchell Goldhar	$2.9 billion	Real Estate
1,440	44	Mark Leonard	$2.9 billion	Technology
1,504	45	Jay Hennick	$2.8 billion	Finance & Investments
1,504	46	Larry Tanenbaum	$2.8 billion	Sports
1,560	47	Stephan Crétier	$2.7 billion	Service
1,560	48	Hal Jackman	$2.7 billion	Finance & Investments
1,560	49	V. Prem Watsa	$2.7 billion	Finance & Investments
1,611	50	Robert G. Miller	$2.6 billion	Technology
1,676	51	Charles Bronfman	$2.5 billion	Food & Beverage
1,834	52	Bill Malhotra	$2.3 billion	Real Estate
1,913	53	Brian Hill	$2.2 billion	Fashion & Retail
1,913	54	Clayton Zekelman	$2.2 billion	Manufacturing
1,982	55	Richard Fortin	$2.1 billion	Fashion & Retail
1,982	56	Serge Godin	$2.1 billion	Technology
2,052	57	Michelle Zatlyn	$2 billion	Technology
2,177	58	Max Lytvyn	$1.9 billion	Technology
2,177	59	Pan Dong	$1.9 billion	Fashion & Retail
2,177	60	Catherine Phillips	$1.9 billion	Finance & Investments
2,177	61	John Phillips	$1.9 billion	Finance & Investments
2,177	62	Alex Shevchenko	$1.9 billion	Technology
2,177	63	Alan Zekelman	$1.9 billion	Manufacturing
2,386	64	Guy Laliberté	$1.7 billion	Media & Entertainment
2,386	65	Brandt Louie	$1.7 billion	Food & Beverage
2,386	66	Sam Pollock	$1.7 billion	Finance & Investments
2,386	67	Richard Warke	$1.7 billion	Metals & Mining
2,386	68	Ivan Zhao	$1.7 billion	Technology
2,481	69	Terence (Terry) Matthews	$1.6 billion	Telecom
2,481	70	Gerald Schwartz	$1.6 billion	Finance & Investments
2,600	71	Stewart Butterfield	$1.5 billion	Technology
2,600	72	Philip Fayer	$1.5 billion	Technology
2,600	73	Zhao Tongtong	$1.5 billion	Service
2,712	74	Huang Chulong	$1.4 billion	Real Estate
2,712	75	Réal Plourde	$1.4 billion	Fashion & Retail
2,712	76	Elly Reisman	$1.4 billion	Real Estate
2,858	77	Michael Andlauer	$1.3 billion	Logistics
3,185	78	James Cameron	$1.1 billion	Media & Entertainment
3,185	79	Brian Lawson	$1.1 billion	Finance & Investments
3,185	80	Cyrus Madon	$1.1 billion	Finance & Investments
3,185	81	K. Rai Sahi	$1.1 billion	Real Estate
3,332	82	Greg Abel	$1 billion	Finance & Investments
Total			$457 billion	

== Historical ==
The richest Canadian of the 20th century is believed to be Herbert Samuel Holt, president of 27 corporations (including Royal Bank of Canada and Montreal Light, Heat & Power), and a director of 250 companies worldwide, who had an estimated net worth of CA$3 billion in 1928 (equivalent to $54.1 billion in 2025).

== Other measurements and rankings of net worth ==
=== Statistics Canada ===
Statistics Canada uses the Survey Financial Security Public Use Microdata File (SFS PUMF) as their principal "family wealth microdata product".

=== Parliamentary Budget Officer ===
In September 2019, the Office of the Parliamentary Budget Officer (PBO)—an independent, non-partisan office that supports the work of parliamentarians by providing authoritative financial and economic analysis of issues related to public monies—published a two-page cost estimate of the "fiscal revenues of an annual tax on the net wealth of high-net-worth families above $20 million". The report was one of 200, requested by the political parties in the months leading up to the 2019 federal election. At that time, the main "family wealth microdata product" used by Statistics Canada—the Survey Financial Security Public Use Microdata File (SFS PUMF)—was found to result in "underreporting" and "missing data." In their 2017 list that ranked Canada's top 100 richest people, Toronto-based Rob McEwen of McEwen Mining, ranked 100th with a net worth of C$875 million, while number 1 on the list—the Toronto-based Thomson family of Thomson Reuters—had a net worth of C$39.13 billion. However, the SFS PUMF only reported on the wealth of families with $27 million or less.

In their June 2020 report, the PBO introduced their new "analytic resource" developed to "address the data gap." Their new modelling approach provides a more reliable estimate of family wealth at the top tail of wealth distribution in Canada. Using publicly available data from Canadian Business (CB) magazine and Statistics Canada's micro dataset, the OPBO created a new synthetic micro dataset called the High-net-worth Family Database (HFD) that recalibrates the SFS PUMF by adding a "synthetic dataset of families with wealth over $3 million". Using the more finely grained micro data base, PBO found that the share of the wealth held by top 1% wealthiest Canadian families is 12% higher than the share previously reported using the SFS PUMF. The PBO says that the discrepancy may be due to higher incidences of high net worth families not responding to the SFS. For example, comparing the two surveys based on 2016 data, the SFS PUMF had estimated the wealth held by the top 1% wealthiest Canadians as 13.7%, while the newer calibrated database HFD produced an estimate of 25.6%.

=== Canadian Business ===
Canadian Business, has also published an annual ranking of the wealthiest Canadian individuals and families since 1998. The magazine has published complete rankings of the "100 wealthiest individuals and families in Canada", an "annual guide to the richest people in Canada—how much they're worth, how they made their fortunes, and the companies that got them there." The most recent available list is updated to 2018. Examples of previous years include 2017, 2016, 2015, 2014, and 2013.

The Thomson Family increased their wealth by 30% from over C$26 billion in 2013 to over C$30 billion in 2014, reaching over C$39.13 billion by 2017.

== See also ==
- Lists of people by net worth
