= Lord Thomson =

Lord Thomson or Baron Thomson may refer to:

- Alexander Thomson (Baron of the Exchequer) (1744?–1817), English judge
- Alexander Thomson, Lord Thomson (1914–1979), Scottish judge
- Christopher Thomson, 1st Baron Thomson (1875–1930), British Army officer and Labour politician
- Baron Thomson of Fleet, a hereditary title created in 1964
  - Roy Thomson, 1st Baron Thomson of Fleet (1894–1976), Canadian-born British newspaper proprietor
  - Kenneth Thomson, 2nd Baron Thomson of Fleet (1923–2006), Canadian-British businessman
  - David Thomson, 3rd Baron Thomson of Fleet (born 1957), Canadian-British businessman
- George Thomson, Baron Thomson of Monifieth (1921–2008), British journalist and politician
