= Family tree of Thomson family =

Wealthy family of Canada

This is a family tree of the Thomson family. The male head of the family holds the hereditary title of Baron Thomson of Fleet in the Peerage of the United Kingdom. Since 2006, this has been David Thomson, 3rd Baron Thomson of Fleet (born 1957), one of three children of Kenneth Thomson, 2nd Baron Thomson of Fleet.

Collectively, the Thomson family is the wealthiest family in Canada, and some members are included on the list of Canada's richest people, with Sherry Brydson – the only child of Irma Thomson, one of Roy Thomson, 1st Baron Thomson of Fleet's three children – holding the largest single stake (23.47%) in The Woodbridge Company, the family's holding company, making her Canada's second richest person and richest woman, as of 2024. Her cousins, the 3rd Baron Thomson and his siblings Taylor and Peter, each hold 14% stakes in The Woodbridge Company. The three children of the 1st Baron Thomson's third child, Phyllis Audrey Thomson – Linda, Susan (died 2017, stake bequeathed to her four children) and Gaye – hold a roughly 11% stake each. The seven cousins (six, with Susan's death), also hold other investments outside of their direct stakes in The Woodbridge Company.

Roy Thomson; 1st Baron Thomson of Fleet; 1894–1976 (Baron: 1964–1976)	Edna Annis Irvine; 1895–1951
Nora Marilyn Lavis; 1930–2017	Kenneth Thomson; 2nd Baron Thomson of Fleet; 1923–2006 (Baron: 1976–2006)	Irma Jacqueline Thomson; 1918–1966 (m. Glenn W. Brydson)	Phyllis Audrey Thomson; 1917–2007 (m. Clarence E. Campbell)
David Thomson; 3rd Baron Thomson of Fleet born 1957 (Baron: 2006–present)	Taylor Lynne Thomson born 1959	Peter Thomson born 1965

== Notable members ==
Chronological by birth:

- David Thomson (1760–1834)
- Roy Thomson, 1st Baron Thomson of Fleet (1894–1976)
- Kenneth Thomson, 2nd Baron Thomson of Fleet (1923–2006)
- David Thomson, 3rd Baron Thomson of Fleet (b. 1957)
- Peter Thomson (b. 1965)
