= The Woodbridge Company =

Canadian holding company

The Woodbridge Company Limited
- Type: Private
- Industry: Holding company
- Founder: Roy Thomson
- Headquarters: Toronto, Ontario, Canada
- Key people: David Thomson (chairman); Jay Forbes (president and CEO)
- Owner: Thomson family
- Subsidiaries: Thomson Reuters; The Globe and Mail

The Woodbridge Company Limited is a Canadian private holding company based in Toronto, Ontario. It is the primary investment vehicle for members of the family of the late Roy Thomson. David W. Binet was the president and chief executive officer of the company from 2012 to 2024. Jay Forbes became the president and CEO in September 2024.

== Main holdings ==
Woodbridge is the principal and controlling shareholder (70,48% (2026)) of Thomson Reuters, a multinational media conglomerate. Thomson Reuters was formed in 2008, when the Thomson Corporation acquired Reuters.

In late 2010, Woodbridge sold its 40% interest in CTVglobemedia (a Canadian media company with ownership of the CTV Television Network) to BCE Inc. Woodbridge held an 85% interest in The Globe and Mail newspaper before acquiring the remaining 15% owned by BCE in August 2015.

== Ownership ==
Woodbridge is the primary investment vehicle for members of the Thomson family of Canada. David Thomson and his brother, Peter Thomson, became chairmen of Woodbridge in 2006 upon the death of their father, Kenneth Thomson.

In 2015, Canadian Business magazine reported that Sherry Brydson – child of Irma Thomson, one of Roy Thomson's two daughters – holds the largest stake in the family company. It is estimated that she holds 23.47% of the company's shares.

== See also ==
- Markham Airport – Owned by the Thomson family via Wings of Flight
- Postmedia Network – Successor to Canwest and Southam Newspapers
- Quebecor Media – Canadian media company
- Torstar – Canadian mass media company
