= David and Mary Thomson =

David Thomson
- Born: 1760; Westerkirk, Dumfriesshire, Scotland
- Died: 1834 (aged 73–74); Scarborough, Upper Canada
- Resting place: St. Andrew's Presbyterian Church, Scarborough
- Occupations: Stonemason, settler, farmer
- Known for: First official European settler of Scarborough, Ontario
- Spouse: Mary Glendenning Thomson (1767–1847)
- Relatives: Archibald Thomson (brother); Roy Thomson (descendant); Kenneth Thomson; David Thomson (Baron Thomson of Fleet)

David and Mary Thomson were Scottish immigrants from Westerkirk, Dumfriesshire, Scotland, and they were the first official European settlers in what later became Scarborough, Ontario.

David Thomson (1760–1834) and Mary Glendenning Thomson (1767–1847) arrived in Upper Canada in 1796, landing in Newark, Upper Canada, then went to York, Upper Canada. David Thomson worked as a stonemason, but they moved to Scarborough in 1799 by acquiring farmland.

He and his brother Archibald (who arrived in Canada in 1773) expanded their land holdings in Scarborough, becoming one of the most important families in the area. The Thomsons are buried at St. Andrew's Presbyterian Church near their Thomson Settlement, in what is now known as Thomson Memorial Park.

Descendants of Archibald Thomson include the late Roy Thomson, 1st Baron Thomson of Fleet, his son Kenneth Thomson, 2nd Baron Thomson of Fleet and grandson David Thomson, 3rd Baron Thomson of Fleet.

== See also ==
- David and Mary Thomson Collegiate Institute, built in 1958 near their original settlement and on land farmed by the Thomson family
