= John Henry Lefroy =

British Army general

Lieutenant-General Sir John Henry Lefroy KCMG CB FRS
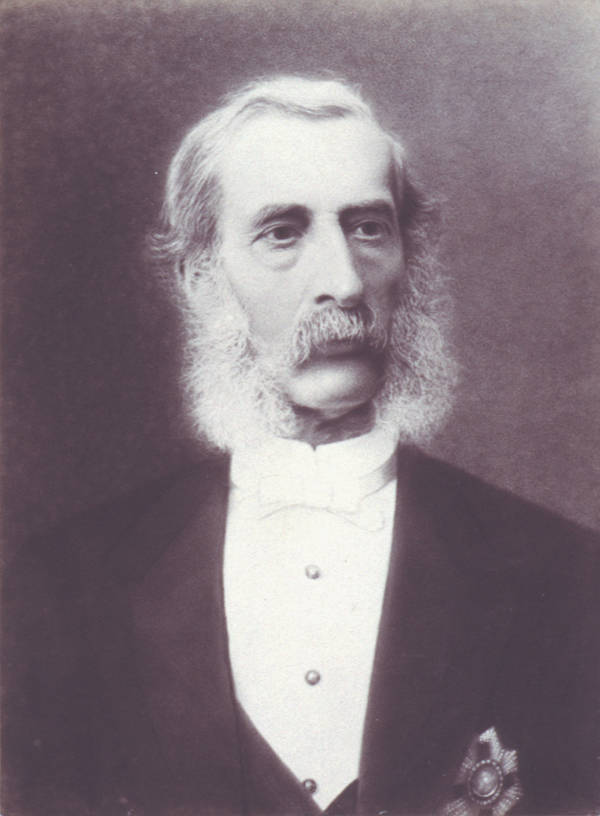
- Lefroy in c. 1880
- Born: 28 January 1817
- Died: 11 April 1890 (aged 73)

Lieutenant-General Sir John Henry Lefroy KCMG CB FRS (28 January 1817 – 11 April 1890) was a British Army officer and later colonial administrator who also distinguished himself with his scientific studies of the Earth's magnetism.

== Biography ==
Lefroy was a son of the Rev. John Henry George Lefroy, of Ewshot House (subsequently Itchel) in Hampshire, England, and his wife, Sophia Cottrell. His sister Anne married the Irish landowner and politician John McClintock, who was created the 1st Baron Rathdonnell in 1868. Lefroy was also a first cousin to Thomas Lefroy (1776-1869), the future Chief Justice of Ireland. Lefroy entered the Royal Military Academy, Woolwich in London in 1831 and became a 2nd lieutenant of the Royal Artillery in 1834. When the British government launched a project under the direction of Edward Sabine to study terrestrial magnetism, he was chosen to set up and supervise the observatory on Saint Helena. He embarked on 25 September 1839, for Saint Helena, and carried out his task throughout the following year. In 1842, Lefroy was sent to Toronto as the superintendent of the new Toronto Magnetic and Meteorological Observatory built there as part of that project. He immediately began planning a field expedition to the Canadian northwest to measure magnetism there. With an assistant and a Hudson's Bay Company brigade, he travelled more than 5,000 miles in the Northwest from May 1843 to November 1844, taking measurements at over 300 stations in an attempt to map the geo-magnetic activity of British North America from Montreal to the Arctic Circle, and locate the North Magnetic Pole. They followed the Mackenzie River as far as Fort Good Hope and visited Fort Simpson in the west. On 9 June 1848, Lefroy was made a member of the Royal Society.

Lefroy remained in Toronto until 1853, continuing his observations and managing the observatory. On 16 April 1846, he married his first wife Emily Mary, a daughter of Sir John Robinson, 1st Baronet, of Toronto; they had two daughters and two sons. Lefroy also helped found the Royal Canadian Institute, where he was the first vice-president in 1851/52 and then president in 1852/53. Before his return to London, he managed the transfer of the Toronto Magnetic and Meteorological Observatory to the provincial government.

Upon his return to London in April 1853, Lefroy held various office positions in the British Army. He became involved in the army reform, and in that function corresponded from 1855 to 1868 with Florence Nightingale. During the Crimean War he began the negotiations that would eventually see the Dardanelles Gun being gifted to Britain. Later, he became Inspector General of army schools and finally in 1868 director of the Ordnance Office. In 1859 his wife died, and on 12 September the following year he married his second wife Charlotte Anna née Dundas (widow of Col. Armine Mountain). When he retired from the army in 1870 with the honorary rank of Major General, he entered the Colonial Service (now the Foreign and Commonwealth Office and was appointed Governor and Commander-in-Chief of Bermuda from 1871 to 1877. These positions, always held together, were reserved for military officers as Bermuda was an Imperial fortress and the most important British naval and military base in the Western Hemisphere, with the Governor in his role of Commander-in-Chief, or General Officer Commanding, having control of the large regular army garrison. He left this position due to illness and returned to England, but later served as Administrator of Tasmania from 21 October 1880 to 7 December 1881.

John Henry Lefroy was made a Companion of the Order of the Bath (CB) in 1870, and knighted in 1877 (KCMG).

== Legacy ==
A small town in Ontario, Lefroy, situated on the south end of Lake Simcoe was named after John Henry Lefroy.

Mount Lefroy in the Rocky Mountains named after John Henry Lefroy, although it appears unclear if James Hector of the Palliser Expedition named it in 1858, or if the name is due to George Mercer Dawson, 1884.

The Lefroy House care home, which occupies the former separated isolation ward of the Royal Naval Hospital of the Royal Naval Dockyard on Ireland Island, in Bermuda, is named for Lefroy.

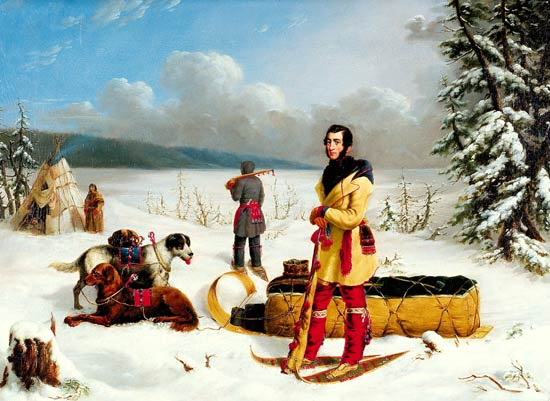
The Surveyor: Portrait of Captain John Henry Lefroy, ca. 1845, sold at a record price of more than C$5 million in 2002. The painting is sometimes also called Scene in the Northwest.

The painting Scene in the Northwest: Portrait of John Henry Lefroy by Paul Kane showing John Henry Lefroy, which had been in possession of the Lefroy family in England, garnered a record price at an auction at Sotheby's in Toronto on 25 February 2002, when Canadian billionaire Kenneth Thomson won the bid at C$5,062,500 including fees (US$3,172,567.50 at the time). Thomson subsequently donated the painting as part of his Thomson Collection to the Art Gallery of Ontario.

In 1960, the Ontario Heritage Foundation, Ministry of Citizenship and Culture erected a Provincial Military Plaque dedicated to Sir John Lefroy (1817–1890) on the University of Toronto campus.

Sir John Henry Lefroy 1817–1890: A pioneer in the study of terrestrial magnetism, Lefroy was director of the magnetic observatory here from 1842 to 1853. Born in Hampshire, England, he was commissioned in the Royal Artillery at the age of seventeen and, because of his aptitude for science, was posted to St. Helena in 1839 to establish a magnetic observatory. Three years later he was transferred to Toronto. During 1843–44 Lefroy conducted the first comprehensive magnetic and meteorological survey in British North America, making observations of exceptional scope and scientific value. Before returning to England in 1853 he was instrumental in persuading the provincial government to assume responsibility for the observatory. Following a distinguished career as a soldier, scholar and colonial administrator, Lefroy was knighted in 1877.

== Selected publications ==
- Lefroy, J. H.: Magnetical and meteorological observations at Lake Athabasca and Fort Simpson by Captain J.H. Lefroy and at Fort Confidence in Great Bear Lake by Sir John Richardson; London: Longman, Brown, Green and Longmans, 1855.
- Lefroy, J. H.: Diary of a magnetic survey of a portion of the Dominion of Canada, chiefly in the North-Western Territories, executed in the years 1842–1844; London: Longmans, Green & Co., 1883.

Professional and academic associations
Preceded by Daniel Wilson (academic)	President of the Royal Canadian Institute	Succeeded by Sir John Beverley Robinson
