= Paul Kane =

Canadian painter (1810–1871)

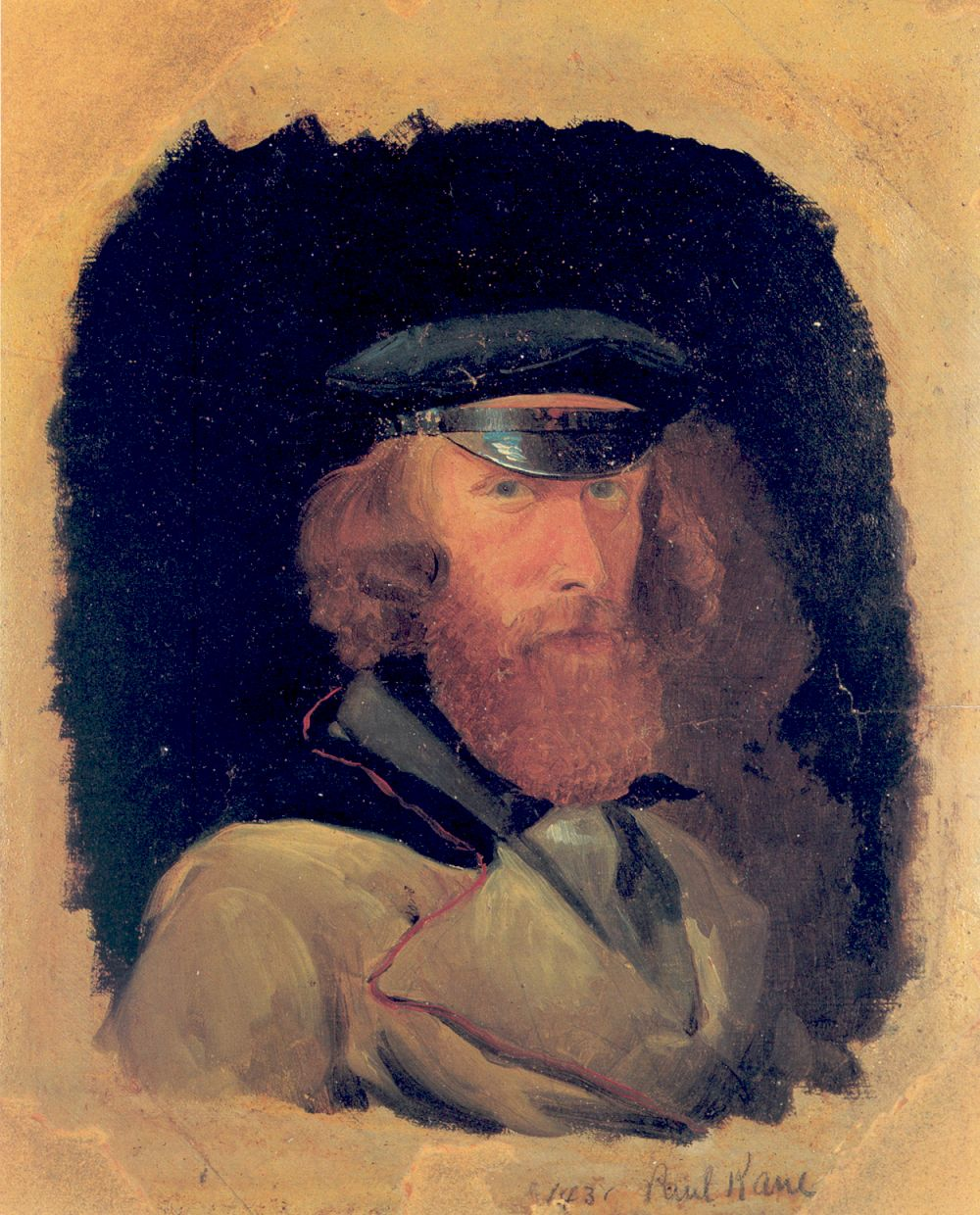
- Self-portrait (1846)

Paul Kane (September 3, 1810 – February 20, 1871) was a self-taught Irish-born Canadian artist whose paintings and especially field sketches are the earliest comprehensive set of visual documents of Indigenous life in what are now western Ontario, Manitoba, Saskatchewan, Alberta, British Columbia, Wisconsin, Washington, and Oregon. Kane grew up in York, Upper Canada (now Toronto), and trained himself to sketch bust portraits of people while working in various towns in the United States during the late 1830s and by copying European masters during a "Grand Tour" study trip through Italy, France, and England 1841–1843.

His travels west of Toronto, which comprised two trips, from mid-June to December 1845, and from early May to mid-October 1848, permitted him to put that learning and skill to use recording the leaders and scenes of the lifeways of Indigenous North America. While his artistry was paramount, Kane also kept portrait and landscape logs as well as field notes. Upon his return to Toronto, he began painting oils on canvas with Indigenous subjects. The paintings he completed in his Toronto studio are considered a part of Canadian heritage despite their routine ethnographic unreliability. The tastes of the age and attitudes towards Indigenous peoples render it unsurprising to find that, following the tenets of salvage ethnography, he worked up sketch portraits of people who sat for him into stock depictions of "noble savages." Something analogous occurred in a book published over his name in London in 1859. Repeatedly if not exclusively, Wanderings of an Artist among the Indians of North America portrays in a negative and pejorative light the people he met while travelling (and did not denigrate in his field writings). It is now thought that Kane, a phonetic speller and indifferent writer, deferred to others to help bring his narrative to publication.

== Early life and formative years ==
Kane was born in Mallow, County Cork, in Ireland, the fifth child of the eight children of Michael Kane and Frances Loach. His father, a soldier from Preston, Lancashire, England, served in the Royal Horse Artillery until his discharge in 1801. The family then settled in Ireland. Sometime between 1819 and 1822, when Kane was about ten, they emigrated to Upper Canada and settled in York (now Toronto). There, Kane's father operated a shop at 29 and/or 51Yonge Street as a spirits and wine merchant.

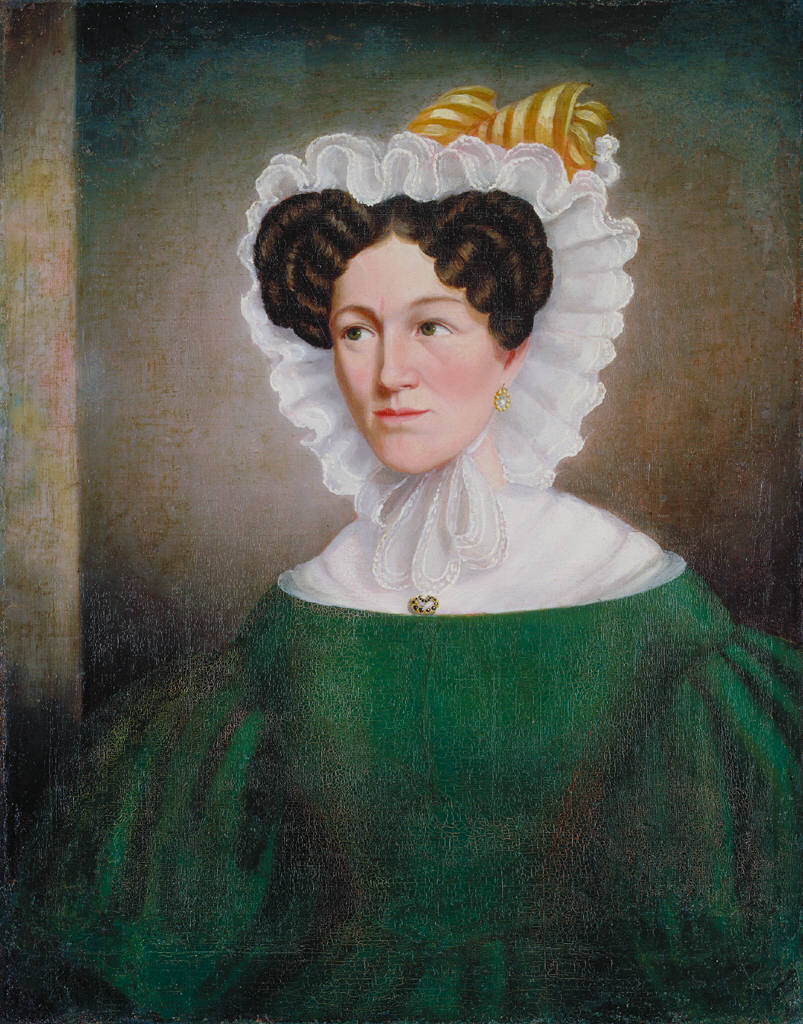
An early portrait (ca. 1834–36) attributed to Paul Kane, showing Mrs. Eliza Clarke Cory Clench

Not much is known about the artist's youth in York, which at that time was a small settlement of a few thousand people. According to the diary of Bostonian Caroline Wells Dall (née Healey), who lived in Toronto briefly and knew both Kane and his wife Harriet Peek Clench from September 1853 until she and her husband left Toronto in October 1854, Michael Kane would not educate his son when he learned that Paul's ambitions rose no higher than to become an artist. (It has been said that Kane attended Upper Canada College and was taught there by Thomas Drury, but this is incorrect.) In July 1834, Kane had displayed nine paintings, eight copies and one original, in that year's exhibition of Toronto's Society of Artists and Amateurs, gaining a favourable review by a local newspaper, The Patriot, which also published the exhibition's catalogue.

Kane had worked as a "Coach, Sign and House-painter" in York but, also in 1834, he moved farther east in Canada West, to Cobourg, Ontario. He may have taken up a job there in the furniture factory of Freeman Schermerhorn Clench, the father of painter Harriet Clench, whom Kane would marry in Cobourg at St. Peter's Anglican Church 16 September 1853. While in Cobourg, Kane painted several portraits of locals, including its sheriff, and Kane's employer and Eliza Clarke Clench (née Cory), his employer's wife. Then, in 1836, Kane moved to Detroit, Michigan, where the American artist James Bowman was living. (The two had met earlier in York/Toronto.) Bowman had persuaded Kane that studying art in Europe was a necessity for an aspiring painter, and they had planned to travel to Europe together, along with another artist whom Kane had met in Toronto, Samuel Bell Waugh. But Kane did not cross the Atlantic with them; instead, he made a living for the next five years painting portraits in towns in the Mississippi River watershed, ultimately establishing a studio in Mobile, Alabama, an initiative that, in time, generated enough money to permit him to go to France, Italy, and England.

In June 1841, Kane sailed from New Orleans, arriving about three months later in Marseille. He immediately set out for Italy. During the course of Winter, Spring, and Summer 1842, he hiked much of the time, travelling on foot from Rome to Naples, for example. After sketching at the Uffizi and Palazzo Pitti in Florence and the branch of the Accademia di Belle Arti in Venice, he walked through the Brenner Pass in Switzerland. He stayed only briefly in Paris before going on to London.

Since January 1840, the London that Kane reached October 20, 1842 had been hosting George Catlin, an American salvage painter making his career painting Native Americans on the plains/prairies. After failing to secure patronage for his work in the United States, Catlin had sailed from New York November 25, 1839, hoping to improve his fortunes. One of his ventures while in London was his first book, Letters and Notes on the Manners, Customs and Conditions of the North American Indians. Called "one of the most influential books ever written about the American West," it was based on notes in his sketchbooks and fifteen letters chronicling his six western tours (1830–1836) to the trans-Mississippi West. These letters had appeared first between 24 July 1832 and 30 September 1837 in issues of the New-York Commercial Advertiser (the owner of which, like Catlin, opposed the US Indian Removal Act [1830]). Catlin lectured at Egyptian Hall, Piccadilly, where he had been exhibiting his "Indian Gallery" (comprising 500 of his paintings) and also staging dramatizations (tableaux vivants) featuring actors wearing, carrying, and brandishing items from his material-culture collection. In his book, Catlin followed the thinking of his times, arguing that the cultures of Native Americans were disappearing and must be recorded before passing into oblivion.

If he knew Letters and Notes or knew of Catlin, Kane probably found the "Vanishing Indian" argument compelling, but he could not have met the USAmerican in London: Catlin's time in the city ended when he chose not to take up the optional third year of his contract at Egyptian Hall, letting his lease expire May 25, 1842, almost five months before Kane's arrival. Thereafter, until he signed his next lease back at Egyptian Hall (beginning December 26, 1843), Catlin lectured and exhibited in such provincial cities as Liverpool, Manchester, Edinburgh, and Dublin. No surviving evidence confirms that Kane ventured beyond London before sailing back to North America in March 1843. By 9 April, he had established his studio again in Mobile. There, he worked until he had paid back the money borrowed for his European trip. He then returned to Toronto in Winter 1844–1845 to prepare for a journey west.

== Travels in the North-West ==
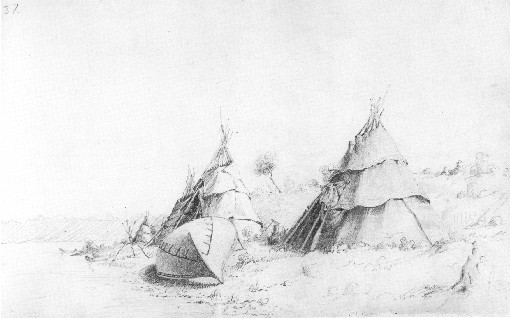
Ojibwa camp at the shores of Georgian Bay; a typical field sketch of Kane's from his first trip, 1845

Kane set out on his own June 17, 1845. After reaching Penetanguishene at the bottom of Georgian Bay, he travelled to Owen Sound and Nawash/Newash (Nawash), then overland across the neck of what was then known as the Indian Peninsula (today’s Bruce Peninsula) to visit a group of forty-eight Anishinaabe leaders who were meeting at Saugeen/Zaagiing (near modern-day Southampton, Ontario). Living during his stay under the roof of Mississauga Methodist missionary Kahgegagahbowh/George Copway and his wife Elizabeth (née Howell), he sketched portraits of leaders like Ojibwe Maskuhnoonjee/Big Fish and Ojibwe Maticwaub/The Bow (aka Jacob Metigwab). He then returned to Penetanguishene, from where he set out north in a canoe through the islands of Georgian Bay with a man named Dillon, reaching Manitowaning, Manitoulin Island, in the second half of July. There, Odaawa, Potawatomi, and Ojibwe went annually to receive presents from the British government. During a stay of two weeks, Kane was able to sketch portraits of some leaders, such as the famous War of 1812 operative Odaawa Sigenock/Jean-Baptiste Assiginack, and Shawonosowe, a local Ojibwe leader whose people honour him to this day by naming their school after him on Whitefish River First Nation.

Kane intended to travel farther west, but when he reached Sault Ste. Marie, John Ballenden, the local Chief Trader for the Hudson's Bay Company stationed there, told him of the challenges of travelling alone through the HBC's territories and advised him to attempt such a feat only with the support of the company. (After the HBC had taken over its competitor, the North West Company of Montreal, in 1821, the continent west of the Great Lakes as far as the Pacific Ocean, Vancouver Island and the Northwest Coast, and the Oregon Country was operating under its monopoly, with more than 100 trading located along the routes of the fur trade.)

Ballenden's advice convinced the artist, so, after poking his canoe into Lake Superior as far as Gros Cap and sketching the fishing lodges and the dip-net fishing technique used to harvest whitefish on St Marys River, he next went to the US government's annuity payment of the Council of Three Fires peoples (Odaawa, Chippewa [Ojibwe], and Potawatomi) on Mackinac Island. (There, the island's Natural Bridge, already a destination for tourists, garnered two graphite sketches, which he finished in oils.) Thereafter, he took a steamer to Green Bay and travelled by canoe through Wisconsin Territory (statehood came three years later), up the Lower Fox River to Lake Winnebago and on to Lake Poygan for the annuity payment in October of Mamaceqtaw/Menomini/Menominee at the Poygan Paygrounds, on the south shore of the lake. Neshnabé/Potawatomi and Menomini were not interested in sitting for him, so he could complete only graphite sketches in a small notebook, perhaps surreptitiously, although he did manage to sketch Oskosh/Oshkosh, the famous Menomini leader, and Aconamy, one of his sons.

Kane returned to Toronto for Winter 1845–1846, elaborating his field drawing into finished oils on paper. In Spring, he went to the headquarters of the Hudson's Bay Company at Lachine and asked company governor George Simpson for support for his travel plans. Simpson was impressed by Kane's artistic ability, and the letters of support of Ballenden and John Henry Lefroy, but at the same time he worried that Kane might not have the stamina needed to travel with the fur brigades of the company. He granted Kane passage on company canoes only as far as Lake Winnipeg, with the promise of full passage if the artist did well until then. Kane would travel HBC routes with the company's explicit aid and blessing for thirty months, and much of his sketching was done at their trading posts.

=== Going west ===
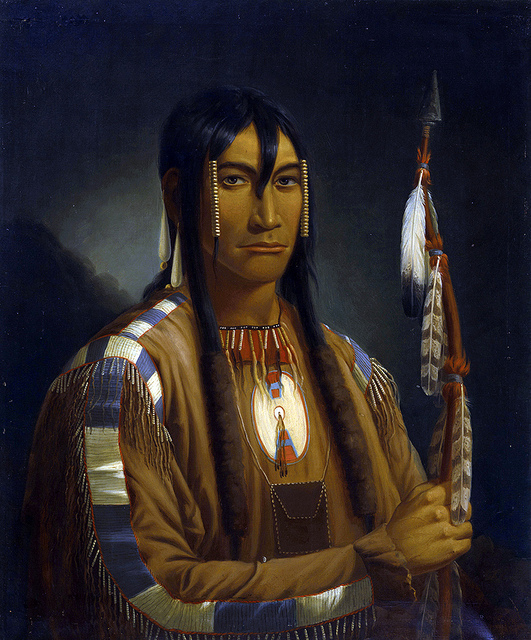
Painting by Kane of a Plains Cree warrior and pipe stem carrier. Seen along the North Saskatchewan River, Saskatchewan Canada.

On May 9, 1846, Kane departed by steamboat from Toronto with the intent to join a canoe brigade from Lachine at Sault Ste. Marie. After an overnight stop, he missed the boat, which had left in the morning earlier than advertised, and he had to race after it by canoe. Arriving at the Sault, he learned that the canoe brigade had already left, so he sailed aboard a freight schooner to Fort William on Thunder Bay. He finally caught up with the canoes about 35 miles (56 km) beyond Fort William on the Kaministiquia River on May 24.

By June 4, Kane reached Fort Frances, where a pass from Simpson for travelling further was awaiting him. His next stop was the Red River Colony (near modern-day Winnipeg). There, he embarked on a three-week excursion by horse, joining a large Métis hunting band that went buffalo hunting in Sioux lands in Dakota Territory in the United States. On June 26, Kane witnessed and participated in one of the last great buffalo hunts, which within a few decades, aided by railroad travel, decimated the animals to near-extinction. Upon his return he continued by canoe and sailing boats by way of Norway House, Grand Rapids, and The Pas up the Saskatchewan River to Fort Carlton. For variety, he continued from there on horseback to Fort Edmonton, witnessing a Cree buffalo pound hunt along the way.

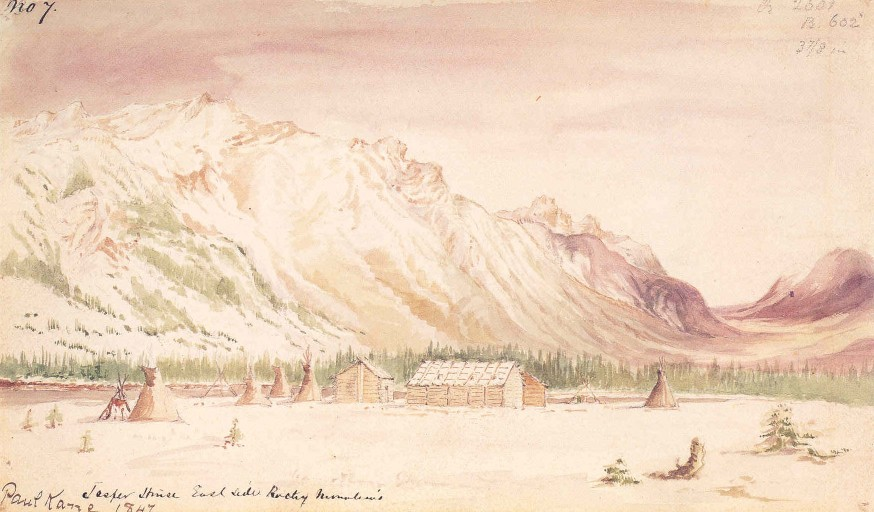
Jasper's House as painted in a field sketch by Kane in 1846

On October 6, 1846, Kane left Edmonton for Fort Assiniboine, where he again embarked with a canoe brigade up the Athabasca River to Jasper's House, arriving November 3. There, he and the brigade with whom he travelled exchanged their boats for horses in order to proceed up the valley and then up the Whirlpool River valley to the height of land at Athabasca Pass and Committee Punch Bowl, the tarn that bestrides the continental divide. he joined a large horse troop bound west, but the party soon had to send the horses back to Jasper's House and continue on snowshoes, taking only the essentials with them, because Athabasca Pass was already too deeply snowed in that late in the year. They crossed the pass November 12 and, three days later, reached the Columbia River at Boat Encampment, on its northernmost big bend, where the Hudson's Bay Company's boat brigade had been awaiting their arrival to take them down the Columbia River to Fort Vancouver (today's Vancouver, Washington).

=== In the Oregon country ===
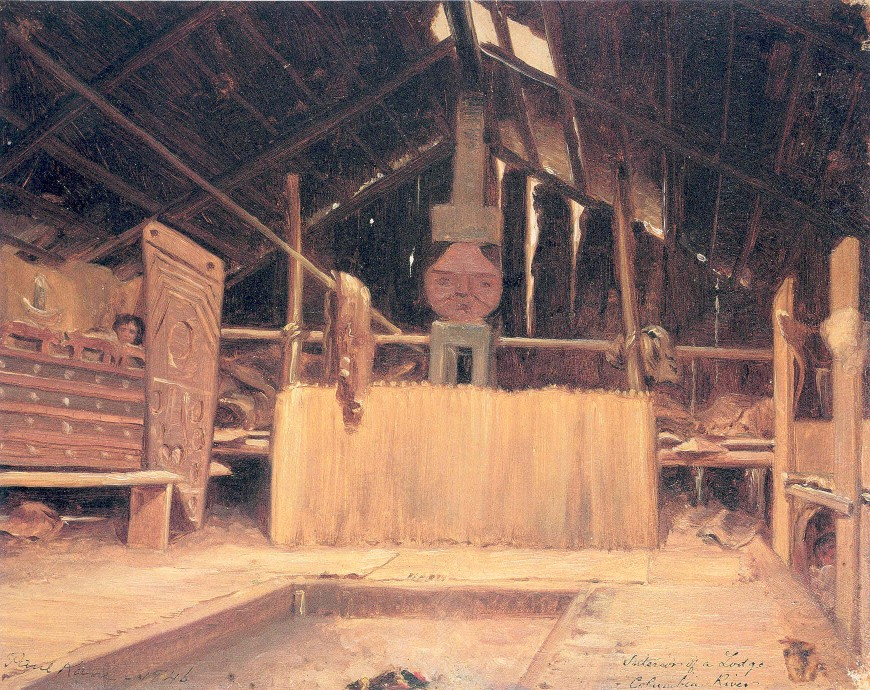
The interior of a ceremonial lodge in the Columbia River region painted by Paul Kane in 1846

Finally, Kane arrived on December 18, 1846, at Fort Vancouver, the main trading post and headquarters of the Hudson's Bay Company in the Oregon Territory. He stayed there over winter, sketching among and studying the Chinookan and other tribes in the vicinity and making several excursions, including a longer one of three weeks through the Willamette Valley. He enjoyed the social life at Fort Vancouver, which at that time was being visited by the British ship Modeste, and became friends with Peter Skene Ogden.

On March 25, 1847, Kane set out by canoe to Fort Victoria, which had been founded shortly before to become the new company headquarters, as the operations at Fort Vancouver were to be wound down and relocated following the conclusion of the Oregon Treaty of 1846, which fixed the continental border between Canada and the United States west of the Rocky Mountains at the 49th parallel north. Kane went up the Cowlitz River and stayed for a week among the tribes living there in the vicinity of Mount St. Helens before continuing on horseback to Nisqually (today Tacoma) and then by canoe again to Fort Victoria.

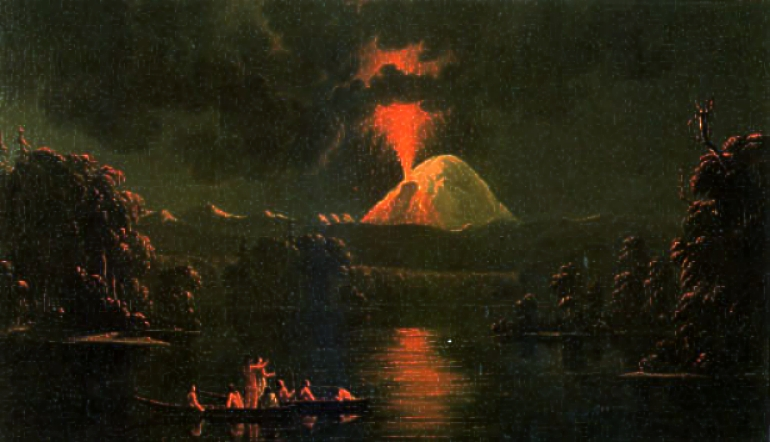
Mount St. Helens erupting at night by Kane after his 1847 visit to the area

His painting of Mount St. Helens in eruption at night in 1847 which is in the collection of the Royal Ontario Museum in Toronto was the only known image of an active Cascade volcano until the eruption of Lassen Peak in California in 1914. Although the scene was somewhat fictionalized, it did correctly show the active vent on the side of the volcano rather that the summit. He stayed for two months in that area, traveling and sketching among the Native Americans on Vancouver Island and around the Juan de Fuca Strait and the Strait of Georgia. He returned to Fort Vancouver in mid-June, from where he departed July 1, 1847, with the annual summer brigade of the Hudson's Bay Company on its way up the Columbia to Boat Encampment.

=== Crossing the Rockies again ===
Kane reached Fort Walla Walla July 12. (Note: This Fort Walla Walla was founded by the North West Company in 1818 as Fort Nez Percé at the mouth of the Walla Walla River, where it meets the Columbia River in the area of today's Wallula, Washington. It is unrelated to Fort Walla Walla, located at Walla Walla, Washington,) There, he left the HBC brigade he was with in order to ride up the Palouse/Pavilion River valley to see and sketch its famed lower/Aputapat/Upputupputs and upper falls, doing so in the company of the Palus leader Slo-ce-ac-cum/Slowiarchy. Thereafter, he went to the Whitman Mission, twenty-five miles up the Walla Walla River from the HBC's post. Established more than a decade earlier by Marcus and Narcissa Whitman, which, at the end of November and thanks to an outbreak of measles that claimed more Indigenous lives than those of resting emigrants on the Oregon Trail, would be the site of the Whitman massacre. He went with Marcus Whitman to visit the Cayuse living in the area and happened to draw a portrait of Tomahas (Kane gives the name as "To-ma-kus"), the man who would later be named as Whitman's murderer. According to Kane's travel report, the relations between the Cayuse and the settlers at the mission were already strained by the time of his visit in July.

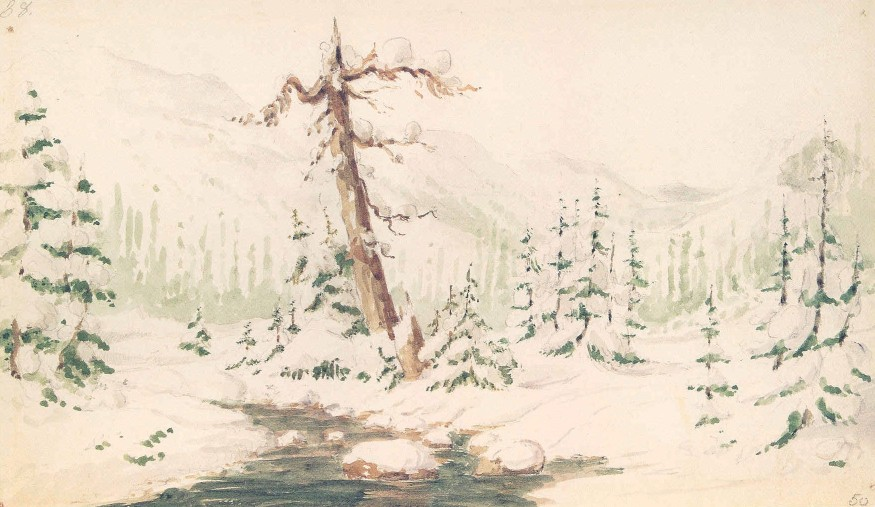
Kane crossed the Rocky Mountains twice in winter. (Field sketch by Kane, 1846.)

Kane continued with one guide by horseback through the Grande Coulée to Fort Colvile, where he stayed for six weeks, sketching and painting the natives who had set up a fishing camp below Kettle Falls at this time of the salmon run. On September 22, 1847, Kane assumed command of a canoe brigade up the Columbia River and arrived on October 10 at Boat Encampment (Note: The site of Boat Encampment is inundated since the construction of Mica Dam, with the ensuing flooding of Wood River and Kinbasket Lake.). The party had to wait for three weeks until a badly delayed horse trek from Jasper arrived. Then they switched, the horse team taking over the canoes and going down the Columbia River, and Kane's group loading their cargo on the horses and taking them back over Athabasca Pass. They managed to bring all 56 horses safely and without loss to Jasper's House, despite the heavy snow and intense cold. As the canoes that should have been awaiting them had already left, they were forced to set out on snowshoes and with a dog sled to Fort Assiniboine, where they arrived after much hardship and without food two weeks later. After a few days' rest, they continued to Fort Edmonton, where they spent the winter.

Kane passed the time at the fort with buffalo hunting, and also sketched among the Cree living in the vicinity. In January, he undertook an excursion to Fort Pitt, some 200 miles (320 km) down the Saskatchewan River, and then returned to Edmonton. In April he visited Rocky Mountain House, where he wanted to meet the Blackfoot. When they did not turn up, he returned to Edmonton.

=== Going back east ===
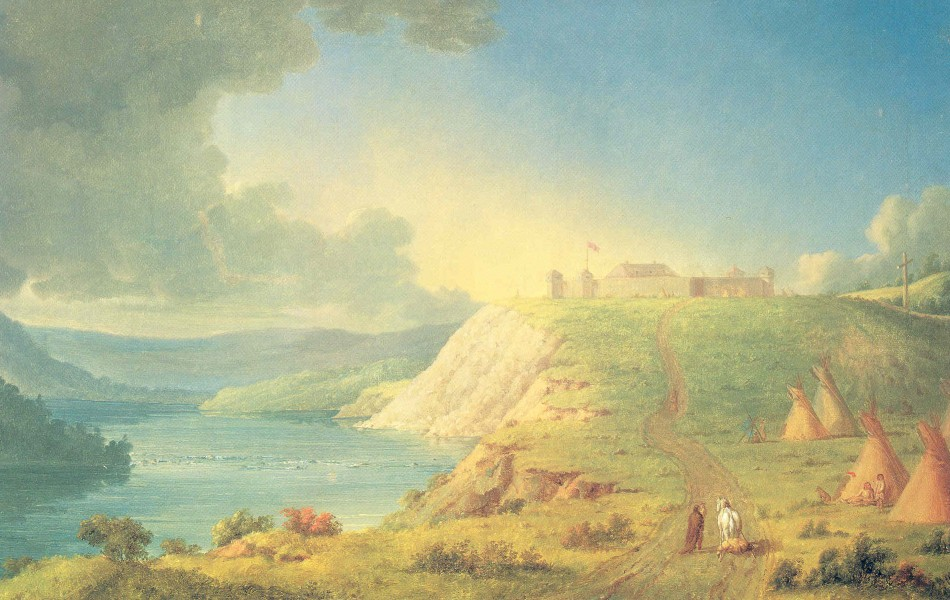
The fifth Fort Edmonton was constructed on the high ground above the North Saskatchewan River after the fourth fort, which had been located on the river banks, had been flooded several times.

On May 25, 1848, Kane left Fort Edmonton, travelling with a large party of 23 boats and 130 people bound for York Factory, led by John Edward Harriott. On June 1, they met with a large war party of some 1,500 warriors of Blackfoot and other tribes who were planning a raid against the Cree and Assiniboine. On that occasion Kane met the Blackfoot chief Big Snake (Omoxesisixany). The canoe brigade stayed as briefly as possible and then continued hastily down the river. On June 18, they arrived at Norway House, where Kane stayed for a month, waiting for the annual meeting of the chief factors of the Hudson's Bay Company and the arrival of the party with which he was bound to travel further.

On July 24, he departed with the party of one Major McKenzie; they travelled along the eastern shore of Lake Winnipeg to Fort Alexander. From there on Kane followed the same route he had taken two years earlier going west: by the Lake of the Woods, Fort Frances, and Rainy Lake, he travelled by canoe to Fort William and then along the northern shore of Lake Superior until he reached Sault Ste. Marie on October 1, 1848. From there he returned by steamboat to Toronto, where he landed on October 13. He noted in his book on this last leg of his journey: "the greatest hardship that I had to endure [now] was the difficulty in trying to sleep in a civilized bed".

== Life in Toronto ==
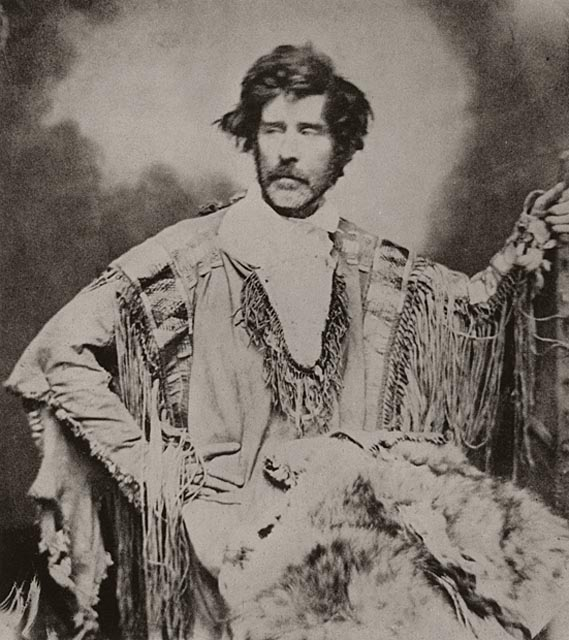
Paul Kane, c. 1850

Kane permanently settled in Toronto. He went West once more when he was hired by a British party in 1849 as a guide and interpreter, but they went only as far as the Red River Colony. An exhibition of 240 of his sketches in November 1848 in Toronto met with great success, and a second exhibition in September 1852 of eight oil canvases was also received favourably. The politician George William Allan took note of the artist and became his most important patron, commissioning one hundred oil paintings for the price of $20,000 in 1852. This enabled Kane to live a life as a professional artist. Kane also succeeded in 1851 to convince the Parliament of the Province of Canada to commission twelve paintings for the sum of £500, which he delivered in late 1856.

In 1853, Kane married Harriet Clench (1823–1892), the daughter of his former employer at Cobourg. David Wilson, a contemporary historian of the University of Toronto, reported that she was also a skilled painter and writer. They had four children, two sons and two daughters.

Until 1857, Kane fulfilled his commissions: more than 120 oil canvases for Allan, the Parliament, and Simpson. His works were shown at the World's Fair at Paris in 1855, where they were reviewed very positively, and some of them were sent to Buckingham Palace in 1858 for consideration by Queen Victoria.

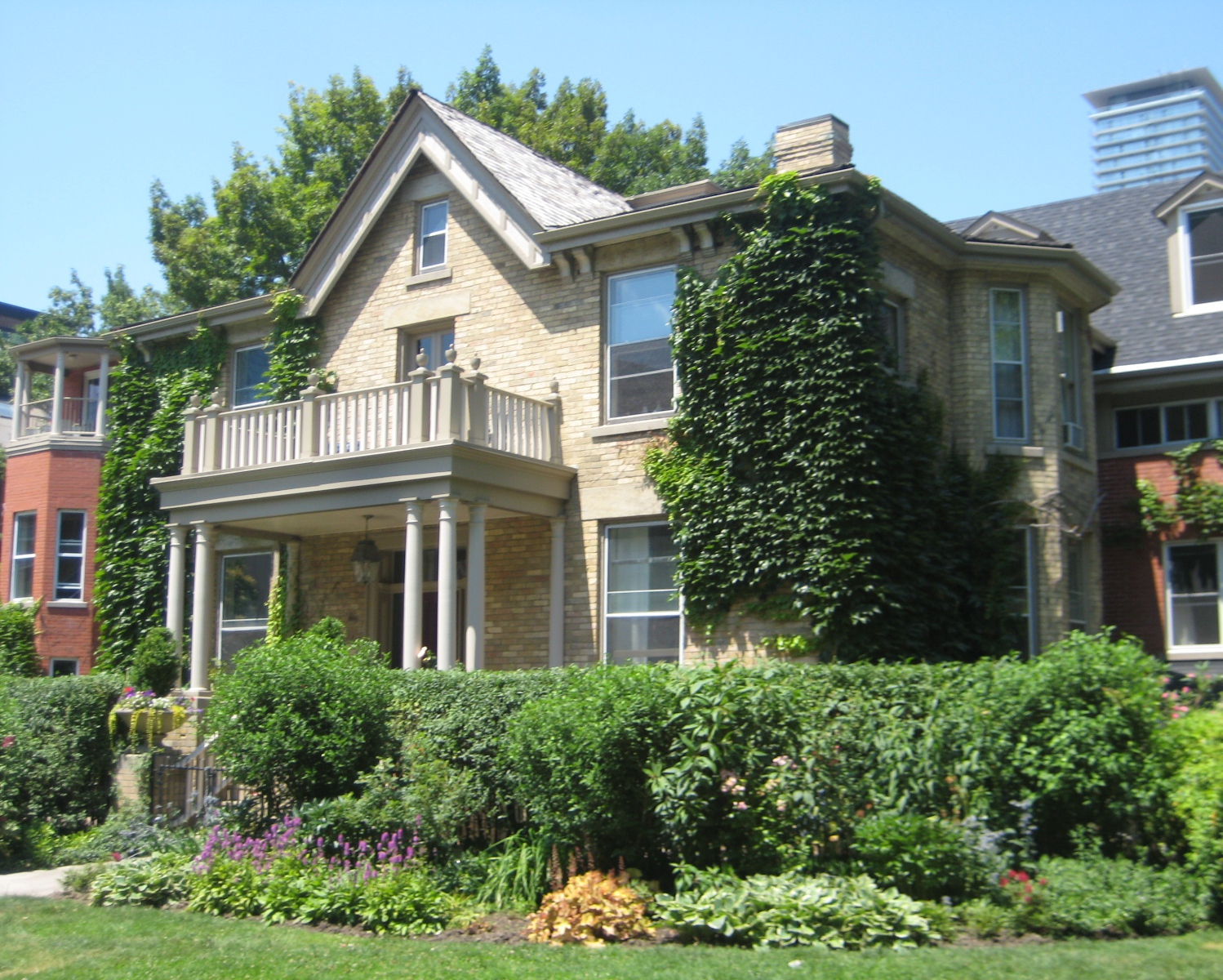
House at 56 Wellesley Street East, Toronto, built by Kane in 1853

By that time Kane had also prepared a manuscript derived from his travel notes and sent to a publishing house in London for publication. When he did not hear back from them, he travelled to London and, with the support of Simpson, got the book published the next year. It was titled The Wanderings of an Artist among the Indians of North America from Canada to Vancouver's Island and Oregon through the Hudson's Bay Company's Territory and Back Again and was originally published by Longman, Brown, Green, Longmans & Roberts in London in 1859, illustrated with many lithographs of his own sketches and paintings. Kane had dedicated the book to Allan, which upset Simpson so that he broke off his relations with Kane. The book was an immediate success and had appeared by 1863 in French, Danish, and German editions.

Kane's eyesight was failing rapidly in the 1860s and forced him to abandon painting altogether. Frederick Arthur Verner, who had been inspired by Kane and was an artist of "western" scenes, became an acquaintance and friend. Verner did three portraits of the ageing Paul Kane, one of which is today at the Royal Ontario Museum. Kane died unexpectedly one winter morning in 1871 in his home, just having returned from his daily walk. He is buried at the St. James Cemetery in Toronto.

== Works ==
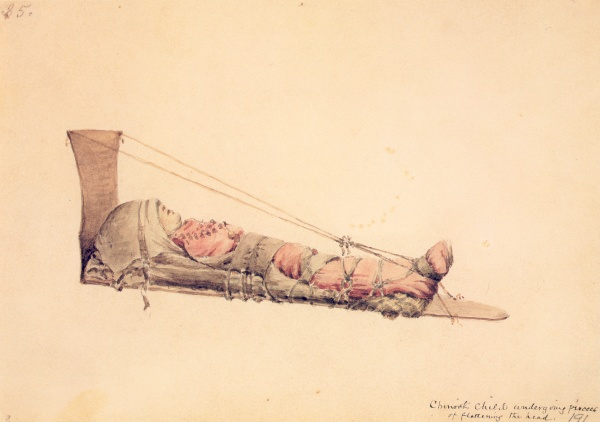
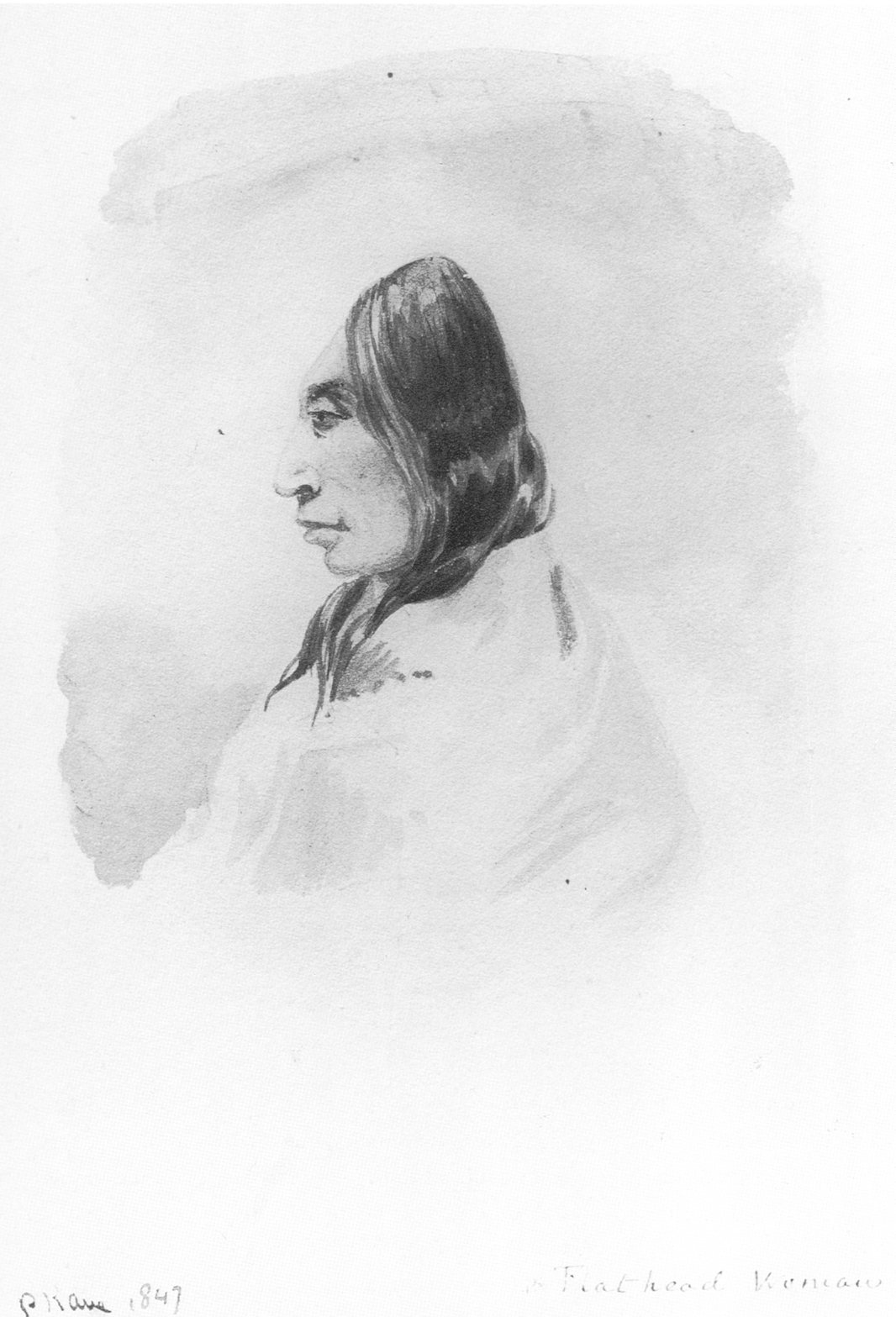
Two field sketches by Kane
Click images for larger views

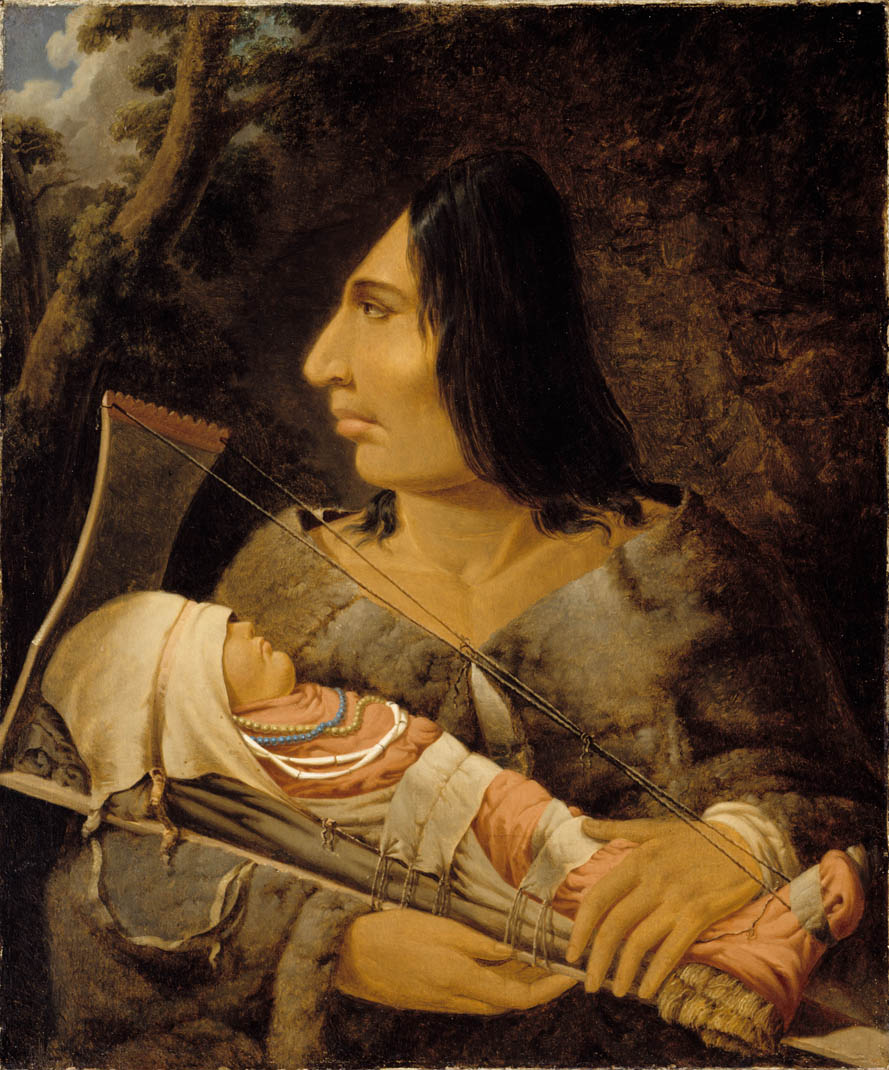
Flathead woman and child (Caw Wacham), 1848–53, and the two field sketches Kane combined in this painting, illustrating the artistic liberties he allowed himself when elaborating the sketches into oil canvases.

The bulk of Kane's oeuvre is the more than 700 sketches he made during his two voyages to the west and the more than one hundred oil canvases he later elaborated from them in his studio in Toronto. Of his early portraits done at York or Cobourg before his travels, Harper writes, "[they] are primitive in approach but have a direct appeal and a warm colouring that make them attractive". The rest are an unknown number of paintings from his time as an itinerant portraitist in the United States, plus a number of copies of classic paintings he did while in Europe.

Kane's fame rests in his depictions of Native American life. His field sketches were done in pencil, watercolour, or oil on paper. He also brought back from his trips a collection of various artefacts such as masks, pipe stems, and other handicrafts. Together, these formed the basis for his later studio work. He drew on this pool of impressions for his large oil canvases, in which he typically combined or reinterpreted them to create new compositions. The field sketches are a valuable resource for ethnologists, but the oil paintings, while still truthful in the individual details of Native American lifestyle, are often unfaithful to geographic, historic, or ethnographic settings in their overall compositions.

One well-known example of this process is Kane's painting Flathead woman and child, in which he combined a sketch of a Chinookan baby having its head flattened by being strapped to a cradle board with a later field portrait of a Cowlitz woman living in a different region. Another example of how Kane elaborated his sketches can be seen in his painting Indian encampment on Lake Huron, which is based on a sketch taken in summer 1845 during his first trip to Sault Ste. Marie. The painting has a distinct romantic flair accentuated by the lighting and the dramatic clouds, while the scene of the camp life depicted is reminiscent of a European idealized rural peasant scene.

Indeed, Kane often created completely fictitious scenes from several sketches for his oil paintings. His oil canvas of Mount St. Helens erupting shows a major and dramatic volcanic eruption, but from his travel diary and the field sketches he made, it is evident that the mountain had only been smoking gently at the time of Kane's visit. (It had, however, erupted three years earlier.) In other paintings he combined river sketches taken at different times and places into one painting, creating an artificial landscape that does not exist in reality. His painting of The Death of Big Snake shows an entirely imaginary scene: the Blackfoot chief Omoxesisixany died only in 1858, more than two years after the painting was completed.

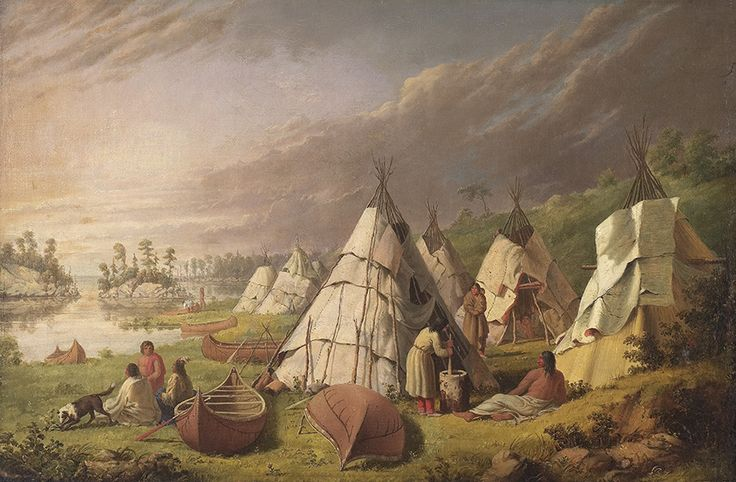
Indian encampment on Lake Huron, 1848–50. Oil painting after the field sketch from 1845 shown above.

His models were classic European paintings (for instance, his work may evoke the work of Salvatore Rosa) but Kane also had plain economic reasons for composing his oil paintings in the more mannered style of the European art tradition. He wanted and had to sell his paintings to make a living, and he knew his clientele well enough: his patrons were unlikely to decorate their homes with unadorned copies in oil of his field sketches; they demanded something more presentable and closer to the generally Eurocentric expectations of the time.

Kane's embellishment is evident in his painting Assiniboine hunting buffalo, one of the twelve done for the parliament. The painting has been criticized for its horses, which look more like Arabian horses than anything relevant to the Canadian West. The composition has even been found to be based on an 1816 engraving from Italy showing two Romans hunting a bull. Already in 1877, Nicholas Flood Davin commented on this discrepancy, stating that "the Indian horses are Greek horses, the hills have much of the colour and form of those of [...] the early European landscape painters, ..." And Lawrence Johnstone Burpee added in his introduction to the 1925 reprint of Kane's travel book that the sketches were "truer interpretations of the wild western life" and had "in some respects a higher value as art".

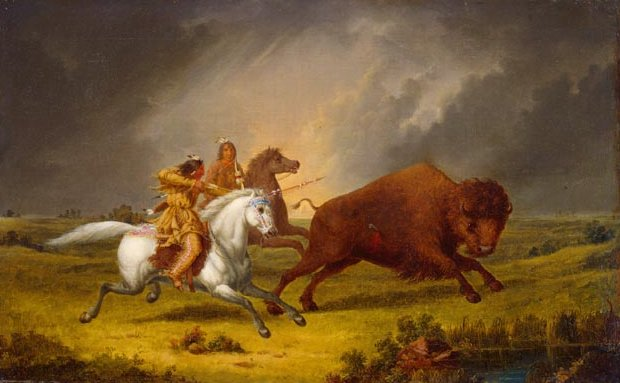
Assiniboine hunting buffalo, 1851–56, an oil painting exemplifying the strong influence of European classic art conventions on Kane's studio work.

Twentieth century and later art theory is less judging than Burpee but agrees insofar as Kane's field sketches are generally considered more accurate and authentic. "Kane was the recorder in the field and the artist in the studio", write Davis and Thacker.

Kane is generally considered a classic and one of the important Canadian painters. The eleven surviving paintings done for the parliament—one painting was lost in the fire on Parliament Hill in 1916—were transferred in 1955 to the National Gallery of Canada. The large Allan collection was bought by Edmund Boyd Osler in 1903 and donated to the Royal Ontario Museum in Toronto in 1912. A collection of 229 sketches was sold by Kane's grandson Paul Kane III for about US$100,000 to the Stark Museum of Art in Orange, Texas, in 1957.

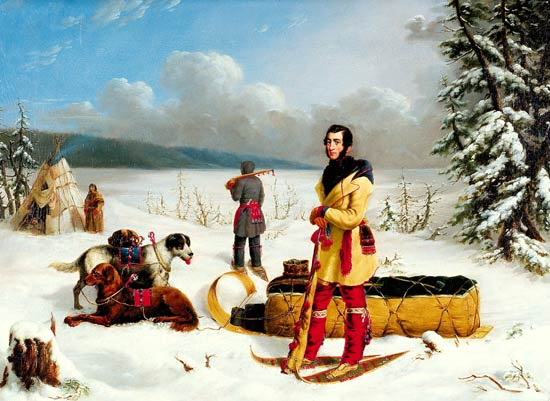
The Surveyor: Portrait of Captain John Henry Lefroy, c. 1845, sold at a record price of more than 5 million Canadian dollars in 2002. The painting is sometimes also called Scene in the Northwest.

A rare painting of his, Scene in the Northwest: Portrait of John Henry Lefroy, showing British surveyor John Henry Lefroy, which had been in possession of the Lefroy family in England, garnered a record price at an auction at Sotheby's in Toronto on February 25, 2002, when Canadian billionaire Kenneth Thomson won the bid at C$5,062,500 including the buyer's premium (US$3,172,567.50 at the time). Thomson subsequently lent the painting as part of his Thomson Collection to the Art Gallery of Ontario. The Glenbow Museum in Calgary has a copy of this painting that is thought to have been done by Kane's wife Harriet Clench. Another auction at Sotheby's on November 22, 2004, for Kane's oil painting Encampment, Winnipeg River (after the field sketch shown above) failed when bidding stopped at C$1.7 million, less than the expected sale price of C$2–2.5 million.

Kane's travel report, published originally in London in 1859, was a great success already in its time and has been reprinted several times in the twentieth century. In 1986 Dawkins criticized Kane's work based mainly on this travel account, but also on the "European" nature of his oil paintings, as showing the imperialistic or even racist tendencies of the artist. This view remains rather singular among art historians. Kane's travel diary, which formed the basis for the 1859 book, does not contain any pejorative judgements. MacLaren reported that Kane's travel notes were written in a style very different from the published text, such that it must be considered highly likely that the book was heavily edited by others or even ghostwritten to turn Kane's notes into a Victorian travel account, and that it was thus difficult at best to ascribe any perceived racism to the artist himself.

== Legacy and influence ==
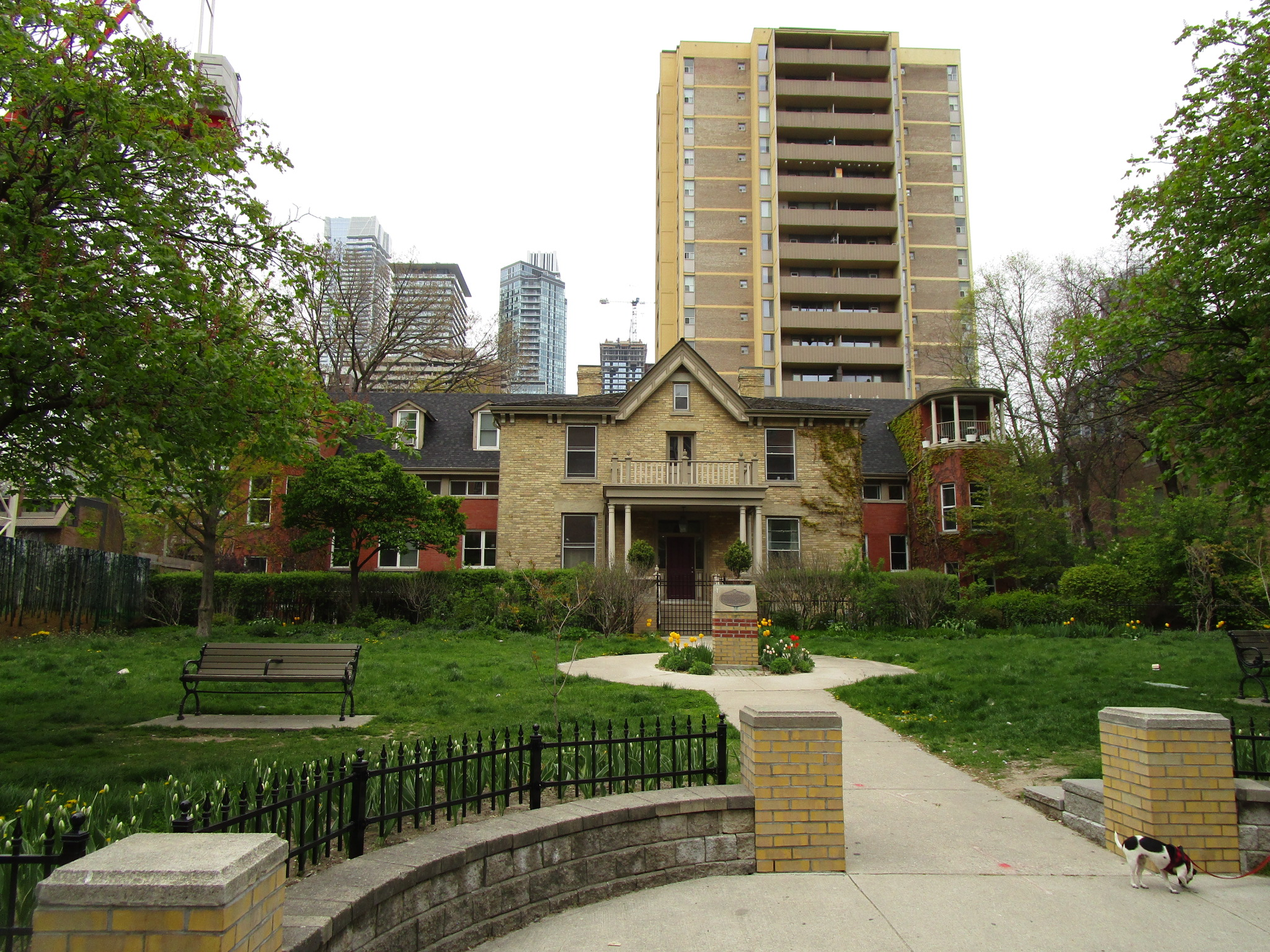
The city named a small park after Kane, in front of his Toronto home. The Paul Kane House was incorporated into the Church-Isabella Resident's Cooperative in 1985.

As one of the first Canadian painters who could earn a living from his artwork alone, Kane prepared the ground for many later artists. His travels inspired others to similar journeys, and a very direct artistic influence is evident in the case of F. A. Verner, whose mentor Kane became in his later years. According to Harper, the early Lucius O'Brien was also influenced by Kane's work. Kane's 1848 exhibition of his sketches, which included 155 watercolour and 85 oil on paper paintings, helped establish the genre in the minds of the public and cleared the way for artists like William Cresswell or Daniel Fowler, who both were able to make a living from their watercolour paintings.

Both his 1848 exhibition of the sketches and the later 1852 show of some of his oil paintings were great success and lauded by several newspapers. Kane was the most prominent painter in Upper Canada in his time. He frequently entered his paintings at art exhibitions and won numerous prizes for his works. He dominated the scene throughout the 1850s, even to the point where an art jury all but presented their excuses when they did not award him the prize in the category for historical paintings at the annual exhibition of the Upper Canada Agricultural Society in 1852. (Kane won that prize consecutively in all years until 1859, though.)

Kane was among the earliest artists and travelers to journey extensively across western Canada and the Pacific Northwest. Through his sketches, paintings, and later his published travel account, audiences in Upper and Lower Canada were introduced for the first time to the landscapes, peoples, and ways of life of these vast and little-known regions. Kane undertook his travels with the intention of documenting his experiences as faithfully as possible, recording the land, its inhabitants, and their material culture. However, it was his more highly finished and often idealized studio paintings that attracted widespread public attention and established his reputation. These works, together with the edited travel narratives that formed the basis of his book, contributed to the popular nineteenth-century image of Indigenous peoples as “noble savages,” a characterization that differed from Kane’s more direct observations in the field. His original sketches, valued for their immediacy and documentary accuracy, were only rediscovered and widely appreciated by scholars and the public during the twentieth century.

In 1937, Kane was declared a National Historic Person, and a plaque to commemorate him was dedicated in Rocky Mountain House in 1952.

On August 11, 1971, the year of the centenary of Kane's death, Canada Post issued a postage stamp entitled 'Paul Kane, painter', designed by William Rueter based on Kane's painting "Indian Encampment on Lake Huron". The 7¢ stamps have 12.5 perforation and were printed by the British American Bank Note Company.

In 1978, the City of Toronto purchased the dilapidated Paul Kane House, which Kane and his heirs had lived in. The building was later designated a heritage structure under the Ontario Heritage Act. In 1985, the structure was refurbished and the front yard developed into a small park.

Paul Kane High School in St. Albert, Alberta was named in honor of Kane. A park in the Oliver neighbourhood of Edmonton was also named after him.

== See also ==
- Elbridge Ayer Burbank
- George Catlin
- Seth Eastman
- W. Langdon Kihn
- Charles Bird King
- Joseph Henry Sharp
- John Mix Stanley
