= Frederick Arthur Verner =

Canadian artist (born 1836)

- Born: February 26, 1836; Upper Canada at Hammondsville, which changed its name to Sheridan in 1857 and is now part of Mississauga, Ontario
- Died: May 16, 1928 (aged 92); London, England
- Known for: painter

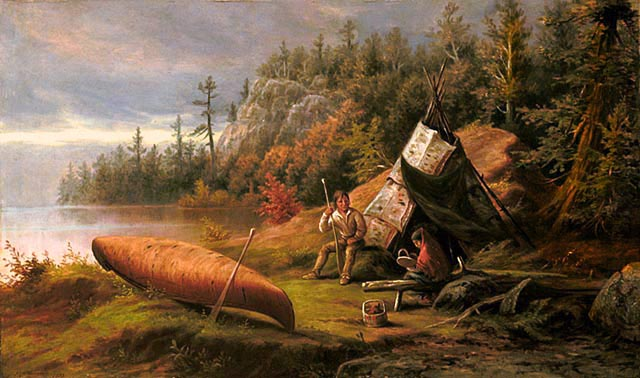
Ojibwa Camp, Northern Shore of Lake Huron, 1873

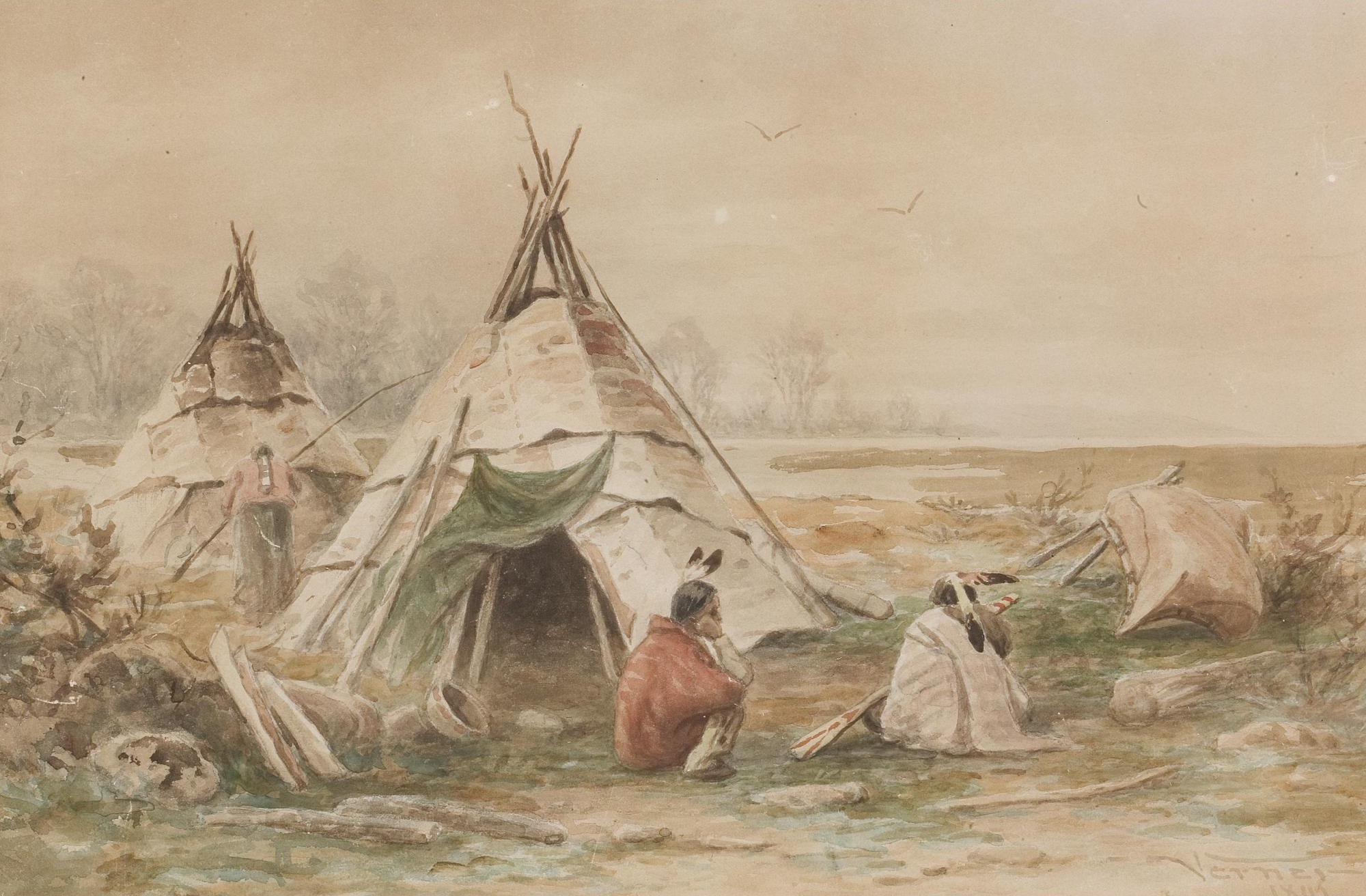
Indian Encampment, 1891

Frederick Arthur Verner (February 26, 1836 – May 16, 1928) was a Canadian painter, well-known for his paintings of the First Nations in the Canadian west and for his paintings of buffalo. His pictures of the buffalo were thought to be “a class of subject where he stands almost alone and unrivalled,” said Toronto's The Globe in 1906. Verner set a standard in this department of art, it added in 1908.

== Life and career ==
Verner was born in Upper Canada at Hammondsville, which changed its name to Sheridan in 1857 and is now part of Mississauga, Ontario. As a boy, he was fascinated and inspired by the paintings of Paul Kane and tried to convince this established painter to take him on as a pupil, but when he knocked on Kane's door, it was shut in his face.

In 1856, he went to London, where he studied at the Heatherley School of Fine Art and the British Museum from 1856 to 1858. He then joined the British Army, enlisting in the 3rd West Yorkshire regiment, where he was promoted to lieutenant. In 1860, he joined the British Legion under Garibaldi to fight for the liberation and unification of Italy. In 1861, he rejoined the 3rd West Yorkshire Regiment. He returned to Toronto in 1862, where he started a photography business and made portraits in oil from photographs. Some of these were of Indians, which was the beginning of his career.

Verner's work is, like Kane's, focused on scenes from the Canadian west and also sometimes based on field sketches, although Verner didn't travel as extensively as Kane. Many of his paintings are based on five sketches and watercolours made when he accompanied the Lieutenant-Governor of Manitoba, Alexander Morris, to the signing of Treaty Three, the Northwest Angle Treaty, at Lake of the Woods in 1873. He used these works (now in the National Gallery of Canada) the rest of his life as the basis for paintings, painting Indians as model images of domesticity or as figures in his landscapes.

He also carefully studied the buffalo, starting in 1875, and used these sketches (National Gallery of Canada) as the basis for pictures, although he may never have seen one in the wild. He assembled these private notes of Indian tipis and buffalo in landscapes in which he sought to convey the light and breadth of the Canadian West. His gift lay in his ability to convey a time of day and tranquil, solitary places, what James Fenimore Cooper called in The Deerslayer (1841) ‘wild majesty”. Verner`s world is in sharp contrast to the work of American painters such as Charles Marion Russell.

In 1880, Verner moved permanently to London but continued to visit Canada sporadically, and he exhibited his paintings in shows in Toronto; Montreal; New York; Philadelphia; Buffalo; St. Louis; London, England; and elsewhere. He exhibited his work with the Ontario Society of Artists from 1873 almost every year till the year before his death. In 1893, he was made an Associate Member of the Royal Canadian Academy, but he exhibited with the Society from the time it was founded in 1880 until close to his death. In 1901, he won a gold medal at the Pan-American Exposition in Buffalo. He was elected the first Canadian member of the Royal British Colonial Society of Artists in 1905 and received the diploma in 1910. He also exhibited with the Royal Academy of Arts in London from 1881 to 1900.

Verner's work can be found in many public collections, including the Smithsonian American Art Museum, Washington; National Museum of Wildlife Art, Jackson, Wyoming; Amon Carter Museum of American Art, Fort Worth, Texas; National Gallery of Canada, Ottawa; the Art Gallery of Ontario, Toronto; the Art Gallery of Hamilton; the Glenbow Museum, Calgary; the Montreal Museum of Fine Arts; Library and Archives Canada, Ottawa McCord Museum, Montreal; the Robert McLaughlin Gallery in Oshawa, and the Tom Thomson Art Gallery in Owen Sound, Ontario.

In 1882, he married Mary Chilcott in England. Among his relatives was the Canadian magician Dai Vernon (1894–1992).

Frederick Arthur Verner died in London, England in 1928.
