= Peter Thomson =

Peter Thomson may refer to:

- Peter Thomson (golfer) (1929–2018), Australian golfer
- Peter Thomson (diplomat) (born 1948), Fiji's Permanent Representative to the United Nations
- Peter Thomson (footballer) (born 1977), English footballer
- Peter Thomson (priest) (1936–2010), Anglican clergyman who influenced future Prime Minister Tony Blair
- Peter Thomson (racing driver) (born 1965), Canadian race car driver
- Peter Donald Thomson (1872–1955), Scottish minister and moderator of the General Assembly of the Church of Scotland
- Peter Thomson dress, a sailor dress, after the c. 1900 American former naval tailor credited with creating the style

== See also ==
- Peter Thompson (disambiguation)
- Peter Mitchell-Thomson, English race car driver
