= Peter Thompson =

Peter Thompson may refer to:

== Sports ==
- Peter Thompson (cricketer) (born 1965), Barbadian cricketer
- Peter Thompson (footballer, born 1942) (1942–2018), English football outside left
- Peter Thompson (footballer, born 1936) (1936–2025), English football centre forward
- Peter Thompson (Northern Ireland footballer) (born 1984), Northern Irish football player
- Peter Thompson (rugby union, born 1926) (1926–1997), Australian rugby union player
- Peter Thompson (rugby union, born 1929) (1929–2025), English rugby union player

== Others ==
- Sir Peter Thompson (antiquarian) (1698–1770), merchant, MP and collector from Poole
- Peter Thompson (Medal of Honor) (1854–1928), survivor of the Battle of Little Bighorn
- Peter Thompson (broadcaster) (1952–2026), Australian broadcast journalist and educator
- Peter Thompson, professor at the University of York, England and creator of the Thatcher effect
- Peter Thompson, associate professor of American history at St Cross College
- Peter Thompson (physicist) (born 1967), chief executive officer of the National Physical Laboratory (United Kingdom)

== See also ==
- Peter Thompson dress, a sailor dress, after the c.1900 American former naval tailor credited with creating the style
- Peter Thomson (disambiguation)
