= Paul Kane House =

Coordinates: 43.66588°N 79.38227°W

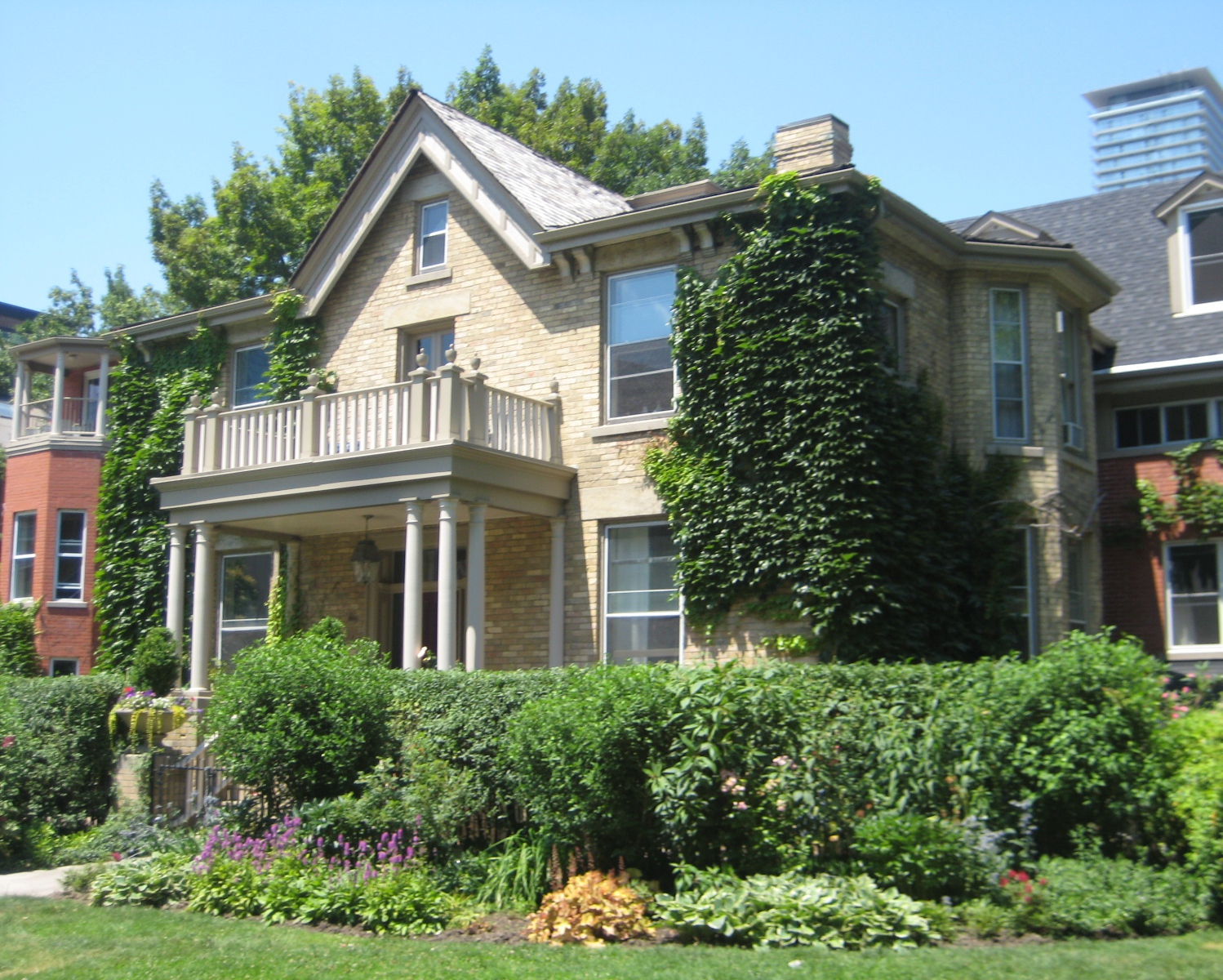

General information
- Type: House
- Location: Toronto, Ontario, Canada
- Named for: Paul Kane

The Paul Kane House is a heritage structure in Toronto, Ontario, Canada. Paul Kane, an important early Canadian artist, purchased the property in 1853 and built a cottage on the site.

On May 29, 1855, a fire broke out in Kane's stables, and spread to neighbouring structures.

He and his heirs later expanded the cottage, and clad it in brick. His family owned the property until 1903, after which it served a variety of purposes. It was acquired by a church for the deaf, who constructed a larger structure in front of the house. When a developer demolished the church in the 1970s, it exposed the heritage house, triggering a grass-roots effort to save the house from demolition. The house was bought by the city in 1978 and subsequently designated a heritage structure under the Ontario Heritage Act.

In 1984, the Toronto Star published an article about the building, illustrated by photos showing it boarded up, quoting neighbours calling for it to be demolished. In 1985, an architect incorporated the house into a new housing cooperative being built on Dundonald Street, the street just north of Wellesley. The design only integrated the sound portions of the house, the rear of the original house being damaged by fire.

The city created a small parkette, at 56 Wellesley Street East in what was once Kane's front yard.
