= Harriet Clench Kane =

Canadian artist

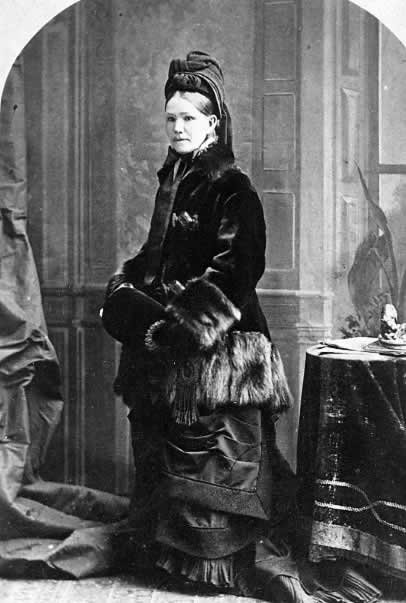
Harriet Clench Kane

Harriet Clench Kane (1823 – January 15, 1892) was a Canadian artist.

Harriet was the daughter of Freeman Schermerhorn Clench, a cabinet maker, and Eliza Cory. She was born Harriet Clench in Cobourg and was educated at a ladies' college in Hamilton. In 1853, she married Paul Kane; the couple had two sons and two daughters. She helped her husband produce Wanderings of An Artist Among the Indians of North America, published in 1859, from his journals.

Kane worked in watercolour and oil. She painted landscapes, flowers and figures. She received several prizes for her work and took part in the 1849 Upper Canada Provincial exhibition.

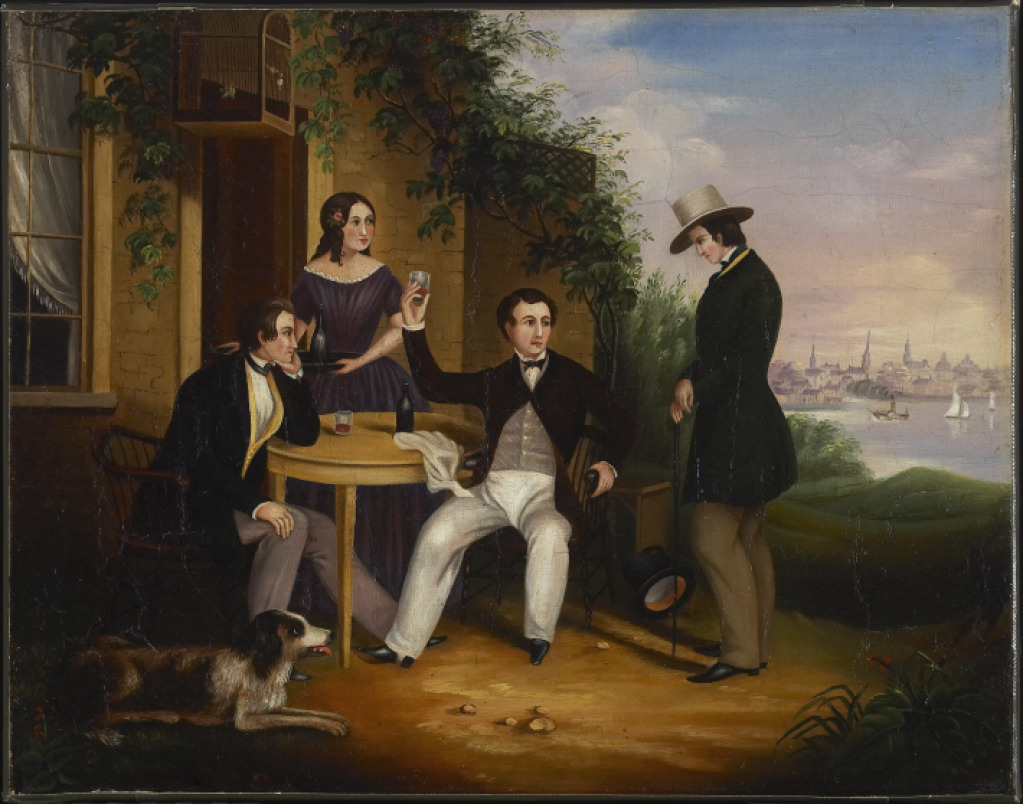
A Country Tavern near Cobourg, Canada West, 1849 by Harriet Clench Kane
