= Baron Thomson of Fleet =

Barony in the Peerage of the United Kingdom

Baron Thomson of Fleet, of Northbridge in the City of Edinburgh, is a title in the Peerage of the United Kingdom. It was created in 1964 for Roy Thomson, a Canadian-born newspaper magnate. He was succeeded in 1976 by his son, the second baron. As of 2020, the title is held by the first Baron's grandson, the third Baron, who succeeded his father in 2006.

== Barons Thomson of Fleet (1964) ==
- Roy Herbert Thomson, 1st Baron Thomson of Fleet (1894–1976)
- Kenneth Roy Thomson, 2nd Baron Thomson of Fleet (1923–2006)
- David Kenneth Roy Thomson, 3rd Baron Thomson of Fleet (b. 1957)

The heir to this title is the present holder's son, the Hon. Benjamin James Ludwick Thomson (b. 2006)

=== Line of Succession ===
- Roy Herbert Thomson, 1st Baron Thomson of Fleet (1894–1976)
  - Kenneth Roy Thomson, 2nd Baron Thomson of Fleet (1923–2006)
    - David Kenneth Roy Thomson, 3rd Baron Thomson of Fleet (b. 1957)
      - (1) The Hon. Benjamin James Ludwick Thomson (b. 2006)
    - (2) The Hon. Peter John Thomson (b. 1965)

== Arms ==
Coat of arms of Baron Thomson of Fleet
Crest A beaver sejant erect Proper blowing upon a hunting-horn Argent slung over his dexter shoulder by a riband of the dress tartan Proper to Thomson of that Ilk and his dependers. Escutcheon Argent a stag's head cabossed Proper on a chief Azure between two mullets a hunting-horn of the first stringed Gules. Supporters Dexter a Mississauga Indian habited in the proper costume of his tribe holding in his dexter hand a bow all Proper; sinister a shepherd bearing in his sinister hand a shepherd's crook on his head a bonnet all Proper and wearing a kilt of the usual tartan Proper to Thomson of that Ilk and his dependers. Motto Never A Backward Step.

== Additional sources ==
- Kidd, Charles, Williamson, David (editors). Debrett's Peerage and Baronetage (1990 edition). New York: St Martin's Press, 1990,
- Leigh Rayment's Peerage Pages
