= Mark Leonard =

Mark Leonard may refer to:

- Mark Leonard (baseball) (born 1964), Major League Baseball outfielder
- Mark Leonard (footballer) (born 1962), English footballer
- Mark Leonard, charged in Richmond Hill explosion
- Mark Leonard (director) (born 1974), founder of the European Council on Foreign Relations

== See also ==
- Mark Lenard, American actor
