= Peter Thomson (racing driver) =

Member of Canada's wealthiest family (born 1965)

The Honourable Peter Thomson
- Born: Peter John Thomson; April 25, 1965 (age 60); Toronto, Ontario, Canada
- Occupations: Rally race car driver Co-chairman, Woodbridge Co. Ltd.
- Spouse: Diana Thomson
- Children: 1
- Father: Kenneth Thomson
- Relatives: David Thomson (brother); Roy Thomson (grandfather)

Peter John Thomson (born 25 April 1965) is a Canadian rally race car driver with Thomson Motorsport, venture capitalist, and a member of the Thomson family – the wealthiest family in Canada. He and his two siblings each hold 10% stakes in The Woodbridge Company, the family's holding company, behind only their cousin, Sherry Brydson (Canada's second richest person and richest woman, as of 2024), who holds a 23.47% stake.

== Life and family ==
Thomson is the younger son of the late Kenneth Thomson, 2nd Baron Thomson of Fleet of the Thomson Corporation, and the younger brother of David Thomson, 3rd Baron Thomson of Fleet. Thomson and his wife, Diana, have one child.

He began rally racing in 1986. Races won by Thomson include:

- 1st in Group N at 2002 STPR Rally
- 1st at 2002 Silverstone Black Bear Rally
- Ontario Performance Rally Champions 2003
- North American Rally Cup Group N Champions 2003
- Ontario National Champions 2005
- Canadian National Champions 2005
