= Kenneth Thomson, 2nd Baron Thomson of Fleet =

Canadian businessman (1923–2006)

The Right Honourable The Lord Thomson of Fleet
- Born: September 1, 1923; Toronto, Ontario, Canada
- Died: June 12, 2006 (aged 82); Toronto, Ontario, Canada
- Education: St. John's College, Cambridge
- Occupations: Chairman, Woodbridge Co. Ltd.
- Spouse: Nora Marilyn Lavis (m. 1956)
- Children: 3, including David and Peter
- Parent(s): Roy Thomson; Edna Thomson
- Website: thomson.com

Kenneth Roy Thomson, 2nd Baron Thomson of Fleet (September 1, 1923 – June 12, 2006), known in Canada as Ken Thomson, was a Canadian/British businessman and art collector. At the time of his death, he was listed by Forbes as the richest person in Canada and the ninth richest person in the world, with a net worth of approximately US $19.6 billion.

== Early life and career ==
Thomson was born on September 1, 1923, in Toronto, Ontario. He was the son of Roy Thomson, the founder of the Thomson Corporation.

Thomson attended Upper Canada College and later earned a degree in economics and law from St. John's College, Cambridge. During World War II, he served in the Royal Canadian Air Force. Following the war, he completed his education and entered the family business, working as a reporter for the Timmins Daily Press, then for the next five years, first as a salesman, later as general manager, for the Galt Reporter. In 1953, he was appointed head of Thomson Newspapers, and lived in Toronto for thirteen years.

== Business owner ==
His father purchased The Times in September 1966. Thomson moved to London the following year to become vice-chairman, and a year later chairman, of Times Newspapers Ltd. He returned to Toronto three years later, and in 1971 became joint-chairman, with his father, of the Thomson Organization.

Upon his father's death in August 1976, Ken Thomson became chairman of the Thomson Corporation, and succeeded his father as The Lord Thomson of Fleet. Thomson never used his title in Canada, however, and never took up his seat in the House of Lords. In a 1980 interview with Saturday Night magazine, he spoke of honouring a promise to his father: "In London I'm Lord Thomson; in Toronto I'm Ken. I have two sets of Christmas cards and two sets of stationery. You might say I'm having my cake and eating it too."

At the age of fifty-three, Thomson inherited a media empire of over two-hundred newspaper and television holdings, which also continued to reap profits from a subsidiary North Sea oil investment his father had made a few years earlier. He acquired the Hudson's Bay Company in 1979, and purchased The Globe and Mail in Toronto in 1980.

In the 1980s and 90s Thomson presided over a number of divestitures, selling The Times to Rupert Murdoch's News Corporation in 1981, the North Sea oil holdings in 1989, and Thomson Travel in 1998. In 2001, The Globe and Mail was combined with BCE's cable and television assets (including CTV and The Sports Network) to form Bell Globemedia, controlled by BCE with Thomson as a minority shareholder. The company then sold all of its community newspapers to become a financial data services giant and one of the world's most powerful information services and academic publishing companies. Today, the company operates primarily in the US from its headquarters in Stamford, Connecticut. In 2002, The Thomson Corporation began trading on the New York Stock Exchange under the symbol, TOC.

According to Forbes magazine in 2005, the Thomson family was the richest in Canada, and Kenneth Thomson was the fifteenth richest person in the world, with a personal net worth of US $17.9 billion. At the time of his death a year later, he had climbed to ninth richest, with assets of $19.6 billion.

== Art collector ==
Throughout the latter half of the 20th century, Thomson distinguished himself as one of North America's leading art collectors. In the 1940s, he began collecting paintings by Cornelius Krieghoff.

In 1977, Thomson found his collection had become a top news story—from The Globe and Mail in Toronto, to The Times of London—after he’d quietly invited English art forger Tom Keating to come to his office at the top of Thomson Tower and check if any of his Krieghoffs were fakes. Keating was under investigation by the Art and Antiques squad at Scotland Yard for selling several fake Krieghoffs in the UK, and he claimed to have painted over a hundred of them, mostly in the 1950s. Keating denied finding any of his pastiches in Thomson's office, and said it was a marvelous experience to see such a fine collection. In 1989, Thomson opened an eponymous gallery in downtown Toronto to display some of these pieces.

In November 2002, he announced he would donate in trust around two thousand art works to the Art Gallery of Ontario, including two major acquisitions he had purchased that July: Paul Kane's Scene in the Northwest: Portrait of John Henry Lefroy, at CA$5.1 million, the highest price ever paid for a Canadian painting, and the highlight of his European collection, Peter Paul Rubens' 17th-century masterpiece The Massacre of the Innocents for CA$117 million.

The collection features essential works of over a dozen eminent 19th to mid-20th century Canadian artists, including some three hundred paintings from Tom Thomson (no relation) and the Group of Seven, a hundred and forty-five wintry habitant scenes by Cornelius Krieghoff, a hundred mostly impressionistic, modern landscapes by luminary David Milne, as well as works by Paul Kane, Paul-Emile Borduas and William Kurelek.

The lesser-known European Collection includes an assortment of 17th to 20th century British ship models, a series of Medieval and Baroque ivory carvings, and features the 12th-century Malmesbury châsse, an ornate casket which once held the bones of a Scottish missionary.

The unprecedented donation of his CA$300 million art collection helped lure Toronto-native starchitect Frank Gehry to design a major expansion and renovation of the AGO, towards which Thomson gave an additional CA$50 million. He also gifted a CA$20 million endowment for gallery operations.

== Retirement ==
In 2002, Thomson stepped down as chairman of Thomson Corporation, installing his elder son, David. He retained his positions as Chairman of The Woodbridge Company, the family's holding company, which owned a controlling share of Thomson Corporation.

In his final years, Thomson lived at 8 Castle Frank Road (gated estate) in the Rosedale area. He died in 2006 at his Toronto office of an apparent heart attack.

== Personal life ==
In 1956, Thomson married Nora Marilyn Lavis (July 27, 1930 – May 23, 2017) They had three children: David (born 1957), Lynne, who changed her name to Taylor (born 1959), and Peter (born 1965). Taylor, a one-time actress and film producer, became known for her lawsuit against Christie's auction house, when in 1994 she bought urns supposedly from Louis XV of France that were discovered instead to be 19th century reproductions.

== Arms ==
Coat of arms of Kenneth Thomson, 2nd Baron Thomson of Fleet
Crest A beaver sejant erect Proper blowing upon a hunting-horn Argent slung over his dexter shoulder by a riband of the dress tartan Proper to Thomson of that Ilk and his dependers. Escutcheon Argent a stag's head cabossed Proper on a chief azure between two mullets a hunting-horn of the first stringed Gules. Supporters Dexter a Mississauga Indian habited in the proper costume of his tribe holding in his dexter hand a bow all Proper; sinister a shepherd bearing in his sinister hand a shepherd's crook on his head a bonnet all Proper and wearing a kilt of the usual tartan Proper to Thomson of that Ilk and his dependers. Motto Never A Backward Step

== See also ==
- Canadian peers and baronets
- Family tree of Thomson family

Peerage of the United Kingdom
Preceded by Roy Thomson	Baron Thomson of Fleet; 1976–2006	Succeeded by David Thomson
