= Roy Thomson, 1st Baron Thomson of Fleet =

Canadian newspaper proprietor & media entrepreneur (1894–1976)

The Right Honourable The Lord Thomson of Fleet GBE
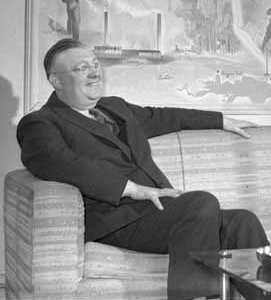
- Thomson in 1945

Personal details
- Born: Roy Herbert Thomson; 5 June 1894 Toronto, Ontario, Canada
- Died: 4 August 1976 (aged 82) London, England
- Resting place: Toronto
- Spouse: Edna Annis Irvine (m. 1916; died 1951)
- Children: 3, including Kenneth
- Known for: Established radio station CFCH (1931), acquired Timmins Daily Press (1934), successful newspaper and other media entrepreneur

Roy Herbert Thomson, 1st Baron Thomson of Fleet, GBE (5 June 1894 – 4 August 1976) was a Canadian-born British newspaper proprietor who became one of the moguls of Fleet Street in London.

He first came to prominence when he was selling radios in Ontario, and to give his customers more programmes to listen to, decided to launch his own radio station. He then moved into newspapers, becoming as wealthy and important in Canada as the press barons in the United Kingdom. He aspired to a peerage but was denied it unless he moved residence to the UK. He invited British newspaper owners to sell to him, with The Scotsman being the first to do so. He later formed a commercial television company, and gained the first ITV franchise in Scotland, Scottish Television, which today is known as STV. From the substantial profits of commercial television, he bought many titles such as The Times and Kemsley Newspapers which published The Sunday Times.

== Early life ==
Thomson was born on 5 June 1894 as Roy Herbert Thomson in Toronto. His father was Herbert Thomson, a telegraphist turned barber who worked at Toronto's Grosvenor Hotel (at the corner of Yonge and Alexander streets – now the site of the Courtyard Marriott), and English-born Alice Maud. The family lived at 32 Monteith Street, off Church Street in Toronto. Thomson's paternal grandparents were Hugh Thomson and Mary Nichol Sylvester. Hugh was one of ten children of George Thomson, son of Archibald Thomson (born May 1749).

Thomson's ancestors were small tenant farmers on the estates of the Dukes of Buccleuch at Bo'ness, in the parish of Westerkirk, Dumfriesshire, Scotland. Archibald Thomson emigrated from Westerkirk to Canada (then British North America) in 1773, and married Elizabeth McKay of Quebec. The family eventually settled in Upper Canada, but retained a sentimental attachment to their country of origin. Archibald's brother David Thomson was the first European settler of Scarborough, Ontario.

== Career ==
During World War I, Roy Thomson attended a business college, and owing to bad eyesight, avoided conscription. He went to Manitoba after the war to become a farmer, but was unsuccessful. Thomson returned to Toronto, where he held several jobs at different times, one of which was selling radio receivers. However, he found selling radios difficult because the only district left for him to work in was Northern Ontario. In order to give his potential customers something to listen to, he undertook to establish a radio station. By a stroke of luck, he was able to procure a radio frequency and transmitter for $201. CFCH officially went on the air in North Bay, Ontario, on 3 March 1931. He sold radio receivers for some time after that, but his focus gradually shifted to the radio station.

Thomson purchased the Timmins Daily Press in Timmins, Ontario, his first newspaper, with a down payment of $200 in 1934 (an equivalent of $3,816 in 2021). He began an expansion of radio stations and newspapers in various Ontario locations in partnership with fellow Canadian Jack Kent Cooke. In addition to his media acquisitions, by 1949 Thomson was the owner of a diverse group of companies, including several ladies' hairstyling businesses, a fitted kitchen manufacturer, and an ice-cream cone manufacturing operation. By the early 1950s, he owned 19 newspapers and was president of the Canadian Daily Newspaper Publishers Association, and then began his first foray into the British newspaper business by starting up the Canadian Weekly Review to cater to expatriate Canadians living in Britain. He aspired to a peerage, similar to the press barons of the UK, and moved across the Atlantic, settling in Edinburgh.

In 1952, Thomson bought The Scotsman newspaper in Edinburgh from its destitute owners. In 1957, Thomson launched a successful bid for the Channel 3 commercial television franchise for Central Scotland, named Scottish Television, basing it in the Theatre Royal, Glasgow. It became highly profitable, with Thomson describing it as a "licence to print money". In 1959, Thomson purchased the Kemsley group of newspapers, the largest in Britain, which included The Sunday Times. Over the years, Thomson expanded his media empire to include more than 200 newspapers in Canada, the United States, and the United Kingdom. His Thomson Organization became a multinational corporation, with interests in publishing, printing, television, and travel. In 1966, Thomson bought The Times newspaper from members of the Astor family.

In the 1970s, Thomson joined with J. Paul Getty in a consortium that successfully explored for oil in the North Sea.

A modest man, who had little time for pretentious displays of wealth, in Britain he got by virtually unnoticed, riding the London Underground to his office each day. Nonetheless, he made his son Kenneth promise to use the hereditary title that he had received in 1964, if only in the London offices of the firm.

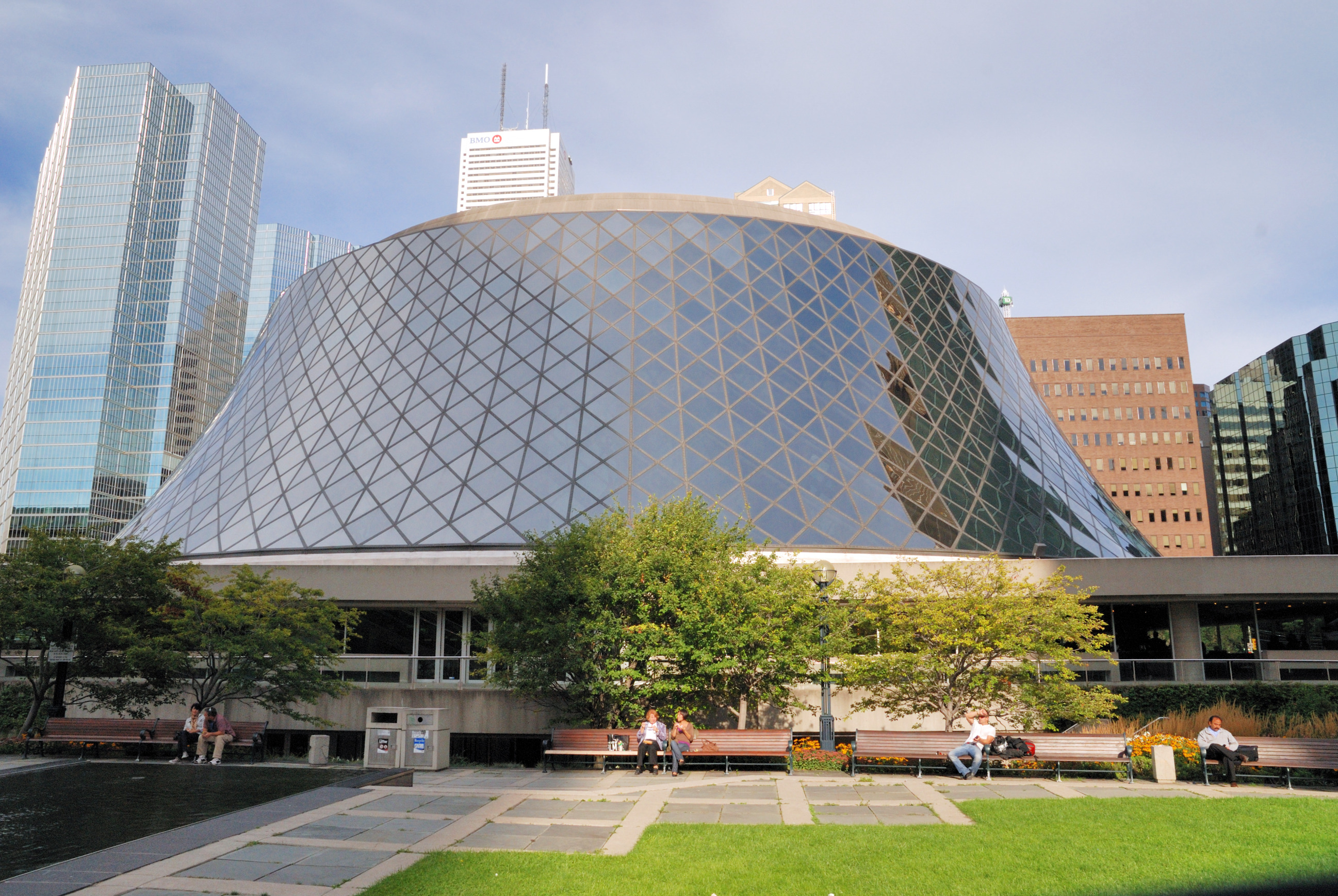
Roy Thomson Hall in the Entertainment District of downtown Toronto is named after Roy Thomson.

== Personal life ==
On 29 July 1916, Thomson married Edna Annis Irvine (1895–1951) in Toronto, Ontario, Canada. Edna A. Irvine was the daughter of John Irvine and Rebecca Caldwell. Thomson had three children: Kenneth Roy Thomson (1923–2006), Irma Jacqueline Thomson (b. 20 October 1918 - d. 1966) and Phyllis Audrey Thomson (b. 6 July 1917 - d. 2007).

On 22 February 1951, Thomson's wife Edna died in Fort Lauderdale, Florida.

In 1952, Thomson moved to Edinburgh.

As of 1964 and 1965, Thomson owned a residence near Port Credit, on Mississauga Road.

In 1976, Thomson died in London, England. A plaque was placed in the crypt of St Paul's Cathedral.

After Thomson's death in 1976, his son Kenneth became chair of International Thomson Organization (including ownership of the Times) and later reorganised as the Thomson Corporation. He also inherited the baronial title becoming the 2nd Baron Thomson of Fleet. With the Thomson operations now principally again in Canada, the younger Thomson did not use his title in Canada though he did so in Britain, and used two sets of stationery reflecting this dichotomy. In any case, as the peerage title he had was inherited, it did not debar him from retaining his Canadian citizenship, and he never took up his right to a seat in the pre-1999 House of Lords.

=== Legacy ===
Roy Thomson Hall, one of Toronto's main concert halls, is named in his honour as the Thomson family donated $5.4 million to its construction. Thomson Student Centre at Memorial University of Newfoundland was named in his honour. It opened 25 May 1968, by the Right Honourable Lord Thomson of Fleet, chancellor of Memorial University of Newfoundland from 1961 to 1968.

=== Descendants ===
Thomson's family continues to use the British hereditary title of Baron Thomson of Fleet. A select family tree is shown below:

Roy Thomson; 1st Baron Thomson of Fleet; 1894–1976 (Baron: 1964–1976)	Edna Annis Irvine; 1895–1951
Nora Marilyn Lavis; 1930–2017	Kenneth Thomson; 2nd Baron Thomson of Fleet; 1923–2006 (Baron: 1976–2006)	Irma Jacqueline Thomson; 1918–1966 (m. Glenn W. Brydson)	Phyllis Audrey Thomson; 1917–2007 (m. Clarence E. Campbell)
David Thomson; 3rd Baron Thomson of Fleet b. 1957 (Baron: 2006–present)	Taylor Lynne Thomson b. 1959	Peter Thomson b. 1965

== Honours ==
In the 1964 New Year Honours, it was announced that Thomson would be elevated to the peerage as a Baron "for public services". On 10 March 1964 he was made Baron Thomson of Fleet, of Northbridge in the City of Edinburgh. In order to receive this title, it was necessary for Thomson to acquire British citizenship, as the Canadian government had made it common practice since 1919 to disallow the conference of titular honours from the sovereign on Canadians. However, the Canadian Citizenship Act between 1947 and 1977 stated that any Canadian who became a citizen of another country through means other than marriage would cease to be a Canadian citizen. Thus, Thomson lost his Canadian citizenship in the process.

He was appointed Knight Grand Cross of the Order of the British Empire (GBE) in the 1970 New Year Honours.

In 1972, he received the Golden Plate Award of the American Academy of Achievement.

== Arms ==
Coat of arms of Roy Thomson, 1st Baron Thomson of Fleet
Crest A beaver sejant erect Proper blowing upon a hunting-horn Argent slung over his dexter shoulder by a riband of the dress tartan Proper to Thomson of that Ilk and his dependers. Escutcheon Argent a stag's head cabossed Proper on a chief azure between two mullets a hunting-horn of the first stringed Gules. Supporters Dexter a Mississauga Indian habited in the proper costume of his tribe holding in his dexter hand a bow all Proper; sinister a shepherd bearing in his sinister hand a shepherd's crook on his head a bonnet all Proper and wearing a kilt of the usual tartan Proper to Thomson of that Ilk and his dependers. Motto Never A Backward Step

== See also ==
- Canadian peers and baronets
- Cash for Honours
- Thomson Corporation

Peerage of the United Kingdom
New creation	Baron Thomson of Fleet; 1964–1976	Succeeded by Kenneth Roy Thomson
Academic offices
Preceded by The Rt. Hon. Viscount Rothermere	Chancellor of Memorial University of Newfoundland; 1961–1968	Succeeded by G. Alain Frecker
