= David Thomson, 3rd Baron Thomson of Fleet =

Canadian hereditary peer

The Right Honourable The Lord Thomson of Fleet

Personal details
- Born: David Kenneth Roy Thomson; 12 June 1957 (age 68) Toronto, Ontario, Canada
- Citizenship: Canadian and British
- Spouse(s): Mary Lou La Prairie (1988–1996); Laurie Ludwick (2000–2006)
- Domestic partner(s): Kelly Rowan (2007–2008); Severine Nackers (2014–present)
- Children: 7
- Parent(s): Kenneth Roy Thomson; Nora Marilyn Lavis
- Relatives: Roy Thomson (grandfather); Peter John Thomson (brother)
- Education: Upper Canada College
- Alma mater: Selwyn College, Cambridge (MA)

David Kenneth Roy Thomson, 3rd Baron Thomson of Fleet (born 12 June 1957), is a Canadian and British hereditary peer and media magnate. Upon the death of his father in 2006, Thomson became the chairman of Thomson Corporation and also inherited his father's British title, Baron Thomson of Fleet. After the acquisition of Reuters in 2008, Thomson became the chairman of the merged entity, Thomson Reuters.

As of March 2026, Thomson is the #521st richest person in the world, with an estimated net worth of $7.3 billion USD.

== Early life and education ==
He was born on June 12, 1957, in Toronto, Ontario, the eldest child of the 2nd Baron Thomson of Fleet and his wife, Marilyn Lavis. He has a sister named Taylor Thomson, and his brother, Peter Thomson, is a race car driver.

In 1978, Thomson received his Bachelor of Arts (subsequently upgraded to an MA (Cantab)) at Selwyn College, Cambridge, where he studied History. As a child, he attended both Upper Canada College and the Hall School.

== Business career ==
Thomson started his business career as a junior associate at McLeod Young Weir in Toronto. He left the firm to enter the family business, working in a number of positions in companies controlled by the Thomson family. Thomson was manager of The Bay store at Cloverdale Mall in Etobicoke, and president of Zellers. David Thomson also served as the Chairman of Simpsons (department store) under the Hudson's Bay Company.

=== Osmington Incorporated ===
To establish his independence, Thomson founded the real estate firm Osmington Incorporated, which he owned and operated outside of the Thomson empire. Osmington acquires and manages commercial real estate assets on behalf of institutional shareholders, including the Thomson family.

Osmington is part owner of the National Hockey League's Montreal Canadiens and Winnipeg Jets, through its partnership with True North Sports and Entertainment. The company also owns the Canada Life Centre in downtown Winnipeg, Manitoba, and is redeveloping the retail space of Toronto's Union Station. In 2023, Osmington revealed that it was bringing the fast food chain Shake Shack to Canada with plans for 35 outlets. Osmington is also a major investor in FarmersEdge, a precision agriculture company. Thomson's investment activities are managed through Toronto hedge fund Morgan Bay Capital.

According to a plan devised decades ago by Thomson Corporation founder Roy Thomson, when Kenneth Thomson died (in June 2006), control of the family fortune passed on to David: "David, my grandson, will have to take his part in the running of the Organisation and David's son, too," Roy Thomson wrote in his 1975 autobiography. "With the fortune that we will leave to them go also responsibilities. These Thomson boys that come after Ken are not going to be able, even if they want to, to shrug off these responsibilities."

Following Thomson Reuters' sale of a controlling stake in its financial business in 2018, Thomson expressed frustrations working in the family business. He is currently engaged in discussions with family members to leave the family business, Thomson Reuters, to focus on his own art and real estate activities.

== Art collection ==
Thomson is a noted art collector and owns works by Rembrandt, J. M. W. Turner, Paul Klee, Hammershoi, Edvard Munch, Patrick Heron, Joseph Beuys, E. L. Kirchner, and Egon Schiele. Thomson owns the world's largest collection of paintings and drawings by the English painter John Constable. In an interview with Geraldine Norman in The Independent in 1994, Thomson said he bought his first Constable drawing at 19, giving the seller "an oil painting in exchange and quite a lot of money". Norman described him as a "fanatical collector", and Thomson described how he "fell in love" with Constable's style as a young child. In his twenties, Thomson stunned the art world with two monumental purchases. In 1984, he acquired J. M. W. Turner's spectacular Seascape: Folkestone, for a record £7.3 million (£21.8 million in 2017) from the sale of the collection of noted British art historian Kenneth Clark, Lord Clark. The following year, Thomson, 27, broke another world record when he bought Rembrandt's monumental Christ Presented to the People, from 1655, for a record £561,000 (£1.7 million in 2017) at Christie's London, when the Duke of Devonshire sold the Chatsworth Collection in one of the largest auctions of the time. Thomson sold both masterpieces within a few years during the 1980s financial crisis.

In 2002, Thomson and his father paid a world record price of $76.7 million to acquire Rubens' Massacre of the Innocents, now the centrepiece of the Thomson Collection at the Art Gallery of Ontario. In 2012, Thomson shattered records buying a painting by Danish artist Vilhelm Hammershøi, Ida Reading a Letter, paying the highest price ever for a Danish artist. In 2012, Thomson broke the record for the most expensive 18th-century British watercolour when he paid £2.4 million for a small landscape by John Robert Cozens.

Thomson has donated upwards of $276 million to the Art Gallery of Ontario's renovation costs, in addition to creating a permanent endowment with an additional $20 million donation.

Thomson is an active acquirer of Canadian art. In 2007, Thomson paid $1.8 million for a face mask, the highest price ever paid for a single piece of Native North American art. And in November 2016 he paid a record C$11.2 million to buy a painting at auction by Group of Seven artist Lawren Harris entitled Mountain Forms.

Thomson operates his collecting activities through his personal Thomson Works of Art. Thomson also funds the Archive of Modern Conflict, based in London. Specialists within the archive purchase photography collections worldwide and also run a book-publishing arm, AMC Books, which has a Canadian imprint, Bone Idle Books, based in Toronto.

== Personal life ==
Thomson is the father of seven children from four different mothers. With his first wife, Mary Lou La Prairie, he has two daughters. With his second wife, Laurie Ludwick, Thomson has one son, born after Thomson left the marriage. With the actress Kelly Rowan, Thomson has a daughter, also born after Thomson left the relationship. With his partner Severine Nackers, a former employee of Sotheby's, Thomson has three daughters born between 2015 and 2021. His three youngest children live in Toronto with their father and mother. Thomson was estranged from his eldest daughter, for five years, with her eventually suing her father over mismanagement of the family trusts. The case was settled out of court in 2017.

Thomson is a patron of the Art Gallery of Ontario. Upon the death of his father, he became the 3rd Baron Thomson of Fleet on 12 June 2006, his 49th birthday. He does not use this title in Canada. He is an avid art collector and owns the world's top collection of John Constable.

Thomson has rarely given interviews to the press and maintains a low public profile. "The only substantial interview he has given was to James FitzGerald, who wrote a book about the elite private school (Upper Canada College) they both attended in Toronto", according to a 3 July 2006 article in The New York Times. "In his comments to Mr. FitzGerald 12 years ago, David had little positive to say about many people in the business world". In the interview, Thomson said: "When you try to live a more balanced life, traditional businessmen think that you are not a real man. But who is not the real man? You are telling me? You have not taken a weekend with your wife, you have no spare time that you use constructively, you do not have any hobbies, you do not know how to spell Mozart. And here you are telling me that I am weak?"

Thomson lives in Rosedale, Toronto, in a ravine compound that houses an underground art gallery. The house was previously owned by Toronto architect Raymond Moriyama.

== Arms ==
Coat of arms of David Thomson, 3rd Baron Thomson of Fleet
Crest A beaver sejant erect Proper blowing upon a hunting-horn Argent slung over his dexter shoulder by a riband of the dress tartan Proper to Thomson of that Ilk and his dependers. Escutcheon Argent a stag's head cabossed Proper on a chief azure between two mullets a hunting-horn of the first stringed Gules. Supporters Dexter a Mississauga Indian habited in the proper costume of his tribe holding in his dexter hand a bow all Proper; sinister a shepherd bearing in his sinister hand a shepherd's crook on his head a bonnet all Proper and wearing a kilt of the usual tartan Proper to Thomson of that Ilk and his dependers. Motto Never A Backward Step

== See also ==
- Archive of Modern Conflict – English independent publisher
- Canadian peers and baronets – Canadian nobility
- Family tree of Thomson family

Peerage of the United Kingdom
Preceded by Ken Thomson	Baron Thomson of Fleet; 2006–present	Incumbent; Heir apparent: Hon. Benjamin Thomson
