= List of editors-in-chief of the largest newspapers in Canada =

This is a list of editors-in-chief of the largest newspapers in Canada by circulation.

== The Gazette (Montreal) ==
- Mark Harrison (1977–1989)
- Norman Webster (1989–1993)
- Joan Fraser (1993–1996)
- Alan Allnutt (1996–2000)
- Peter Stockland (2000–2004)
- Andrew Phillips (2004–2009)
- Raymond Brassard (2010–2013)
- Lucinda Chodan (2013–present)

== The Globe and Mail ==
- George McCullagh (1936–1952)
- Oakley Dalgleish (1952–1963)
- R. Howard Webster 1963–1965
- James L. Cooper (1965–1974)
- Richard S. Malone (1974–1978)
- Richard Doyle (1978–1983)
- Norman Webster (1983–1989)
- William Thorsell (1989–1999)
- Richard Addis (1999–2002)
- Edward Greenspon (2002–2009)
- John Stackhouse (2009–2014)
- David Walmsley (2014–present)

== Le Journal de Montréal ==
- André Lecompte (1964–?)
- Paule Beaugrand-Champagne
- Lyne Robitaille

== National Post ==
- Kenneth Whyte (1998–2003)
- Matthew Fraser (2003–2005)
- Doug Kelly (2005–2010)
- Stephen Meurice (2010–2014)
- Rob Roberts (2019-present)

== Ottawa Citizen ==
- Charles Herbert Mackintosh (1874–1892)
- Hugh Clark 1897–1898
- Edward Morrison (1898–1913)
- Keith Spicer (1985–1989)
- Gordon Fisher (1989–1991)
- James Travers (1991–1996)
- Neil Reynolds (1996–2000)
- Scott Keir Anderson (2000–2007)
- Gerry Nott (2009–present)

== La Presse ==
- William-Edmond Blumhart
- Guy Crevier (2001)
- Philippe Cantin
- André Pratte (2001–present)

== Toronto Star ==
- Joseph E. Atkinson (1899–1948)
- Harry C. Hindmarsh (1948–1955)
- Beland Honderich (1955–1966)
- Peter Newman (1969–1971)
- Robert Nielsen (acting 1971)
- Martin Wise Goodman (1971–1978)
- Denis Harvey (1978–1981)
- George Radwanski (1981–1985)
- Fred Kuntz (2006–2008)
- Giles Gherson (2004–2006)
- Michael Cooke (2009–2018)
- Anne Marie Owens (2021-2024)
- Nicole MacIntyre (2024–present)

== Toronto Sun ==
- Peter Worthington (1971–1982), editor until 1976; no editor-in-chief previously
- Barbara Amiel (1983–1985)
- John Downing (1985–1997), with the title of editor; there was no editor-in-chief until 1995
- Peter O'Sullivan (1995–1999)
- Mike Strobel (1999–2001)
- Mike Therien (2001–2004)
- Jim Jennings (2004–2006)
- Glenn Garnett (2007)
- Lou Clancy (2007–2009)
- James Wallace (2009–2013)
- Wendy Metcalfe (2013–2015)
- Adrienne Batra (2015–present)

== The Vancouver Sun ==
- Neil Reynolds (2000–2003)
- Patricia Graham (2003–present)

== Winnipeg Free Press ==
- William Fisher Luxton (1872–1893)
- Frederick Molyneux St. John (1893–1895)
- Arnott James Magurn (1898–1901)
- John Wesley Dafoe (1901–1944)
- George Victor Ferguson (1944–1946)
- Grant Dexter (1946–1954)
- Thomas Worrall Kent (1954–1959)
- Shane MacKay (1959–1967)
- Richard S. Malone (1967–1974)
- Peter McLintock (1974–1979)
- John Dafoe (1979–1993)
- Duncan McMonagle (1993–1996)
- Nicholas Hirst (1996–2005)
- Bob Cox (2005–2007)
- Margo Goodhand (2007–2012)
- Paul Samyn (2012–present)

== See also ==
- List of newspapers in Canada
