= Asper (surname) =

Asper is a surname. Notable people with the surname include:

- Aemilius Asper, 1st or 2nd century Latin grammarian
- Gaius Julius Asper, Ancient Roman politician of the 2nd and 3rd centuries CE
- David Asper, Vice-president of CanWest Global Communications Corp.
- Frank W. Asper (1892–1973), Latter-day Saint composer and Mormon Tabernacle organist.
- Gail Asper, President of the CanWest Global Foundation and managing director and secretary of The Asper Foundation
- Hans Asper (1499–1571), Swiss painter
- Izzy Asper (1932–2003), Canadian media magnate
- Leonard Asper, President and CEO of CanWest Global Communications Corp.
- Linda Asper, Manitoba politician
- Mattias Asper, Swedish football goalkeeper
