= Gerry Nott =

Canadian newspaper editor

- Occupation: Editor-in-Chief & Publisher
- Children: 2

Gerry Nott is a former Editor-in-Chief at the Ottawa Citizen. He formerly held the same position at Canwest. In 2009, he and Scott Keir Anderson swapped positions.

He previously worked at The Hamilton Spectator, the Windsor Star and the Calgary Herald.
