= Southam Inc. =

Canadian news agency

- Type: Public
- Industry: News Media Chain
- Founded: 1904
- Founder: William Southam
- Defunct: January 28, 2003
- Fate: Sold
- Successor: Canwest
- Headquarters: Toronto, Canada
- Area served: Canada
- Key people: Charles Lynch
- Products: Newspapers and newswires

Southam Inc., also known as Southam News, Southam Newspapers, and Southam Newswire, was a media company and news agency in Canada. Company founder William Southam started as a paper boy for the London Free Press and eventually went on to acquire many prominent daily newspapers across Canada such as the Calgary Herald, Edmonton Journal, Ottawa Citizen, The Province and Winnipeg Tribune and created Southam Inc. in 1904 to run them.

Through a series of transactions with Thomson Newspapers and FP Publications Ltd. between 1979 and 1980, Southam acquired monopolies in the Victoria, Vancouver, Alberta, Ottawa and Montreal markets for its daily papers. These acquisitions and paper closings directly caused the Canadian government to call, in September 1980, a royal commission on Newspapers, informally known as the Kent Commission.

By the end of 1980s, Southam Inc. became Canada's largest newspaper chain, with daily papers in most major urban centres. Hollinger Inc. gained control of the company in 1996 and it was eventually broken up and sold to media conglomerate Canwest in 2000. The brand continued on until 2003, when Canwest retired it in favour of its own branding for its newspaper chain and newswire. Since 2010, many former Southam newspapers are now owned by Postmedia Network Inc.

== History ==
William Southam was the main force behind the company that bears his name, to manage his growing newspaper empire. Once a delivery boy for The London Free Press, he had risen up the ranks to become a part owner of the paper by 1867. He bought the failing The Hamilton Spectator in 1877 for $5,000 and turned its fortunes around. Beginning in 1897, Southam began acquiring other papers in the country including the Calgary Herald, the Ottawa Citizen, Vancouver's The Province.

=== 1904–1979: A leading Canadian chain ===
On March 11, 1904, Southam Limited was incorporated. The new company, with $1 million in capital, was set up to provide centralization for all of William Southam's interests in many Canadian newspapers and printing plants. Beside William Southam on its board, it also included his sons: William J. Southam of Hamilton; Wilson M. Southam and Harry S. Southam, Ottawa; Richard Southam of Toronto, and Fred N. Southam, of Montreal. The sons ran the company newspapers and printing plants in those cities.

Over the next 70-plus years, it grew into one of the largest newspaper chains in the country, with 17 daily newspapers and 56 community newspapers. As the newspaper chain expanded, the associated wire service, Southam News Service, was created and expanded with it.

=== 1979–1980: Reshaping Canada's newspaper industry ===
When FP Publications Ltd. closed The Montreal Star – at one time, Canada's largest circulation newspaper until the 1950s – in September 1979, it started a chain reaction of consolidation within the Canadian newspaper industry. The consolidation ended when Southam and Thomson traded papers in various locations across Canada in August 1980.

The 1980s opened with Thomson Newspapers Ltd. buying, in January 1980, FB Publications Ltd. This transaction included its chain, Canadian Newspapers Limited Partnership, that at the time, owned Toronto's The Globe and Mail, the Winnipeg Free Press, two Alberta papers, and a 50 percent share of Pacific Press Ltd which controlled two of Victoria, British Columbia newspapers, The Daily Colonist and The Victoria Times.

In early April 1980, the FP Publications brand was retired, and merged with Thomson under the Thomson Newspapers brand. In late April 1980, Thomson Newspaper bought the remaining FP Publication shares from Newsco Investments Ltd. – controlled by former Globe and Mail owner, R. Howard Webster – giving them 100 percent control of the company and its properties.

By June 1980, the ramifications of the Montreal Star closing and Thomson's acquisition of the Star's parent company, FP Publications began to emerge. Southam Inc. had to sell Thomson Newspapers one-third of Montreal's The Gazette to acquire the assets of the now closed Star paper. Southam Inc. acted on the option to purchase from FP the Star's assets, including its printing plant, for $16 million. Thomson, the successor company to FP, exercised its option to purchase a one-third ownership stake in The Gazette on June 12, 1980, as part of the agreement between Southam and FP.

Southam decided to close The Winnipeg Tribune on August 27, 1980, and Thomson Newspapers bought its assets. Thomson also closed The Ottawa Journal around the same time as the Winnipeg Tribune, leaving Southam's The Citizen as the only English-language newspaper in that market. The August 27, 1980 deals gave Southam monopolies in English-language newspaper markets such as Montreal (The Gazette), Ottawa (The Citizen), and in the Vancouver market (The Province & The Vancouver Sun) when they bought both Thomson's minority shares in The Gazette and their 50 percent share in Pacific Press Ltd for $57,250,000.

Critics of the largest consolidation in Canadian newspaper history, up to that time, called it a failure in the Canadian government's anti-combines legislation. Federal Opposition Leader, Joe Clark, called for a federal inquiry into Southam and Thomson's dealings. But the publishers of the independent The Leader-Post and The Saskatoon Star-Phoenix thought the closures of The Journal and The Tribune might actually serve the public good better with one strong, and financially secure paper in each major urban centre, rather than two struggling ones.

In 1981, Southam purchased, the three-day-a-week newspaper, the Kamloops News. This gave Thompson a competitor to its Kamloops Sentinel.

=== 1996–2000: Sale to Hollinger ===
Southam Newspapers was taken over by Hollinger Inc. in 1996, after Conrad Black gained a controlling stake in the company. Under Hollinger control, Southam made further acquisitions, including most of the British Columbia print media holdings of Thomson Newspapers. The purchase meant that Southam had a virtual monopoly on Vancouver Island and mainland British Columbia's newspaper market.

=== 2000–2003: Southam's demise ===
On November 15, 2000, the Southam Newspapers company was broken up with the print media holdings and the Southam Newspapers name being sold to media company Canwest. Canwest examined ways to integrate many of its smaller market papers into its Global television news division; however, it wasn't to be. On August 10, 2002, Canwest sold eight Atlantic Canada and two Saskatchewan daily newspapers, 34 community papers, and two printing plants to Transcontinental Media including the Cape Breton Post, and St. John's The Telegram. The deal allowed Transcontinental to use its newly acquired Summerside, Prince Edward Island plant to print the Atlantic Canada version of the National Post. More Canwest papers were spun off to Osprey Media on January 28, 2003, when four Ontario daily newspapers joined that company: St. Catharines Standard, Brantford Expositor, Niagara Falls Review, and The Welland Tribune. 21 community weekly papers were also sold off to Osprey as well.

At the end of January 2003, Leonard Asper, Canwest's president and CEO announced that the Southam corporate name was to be retired, and Canwest branding would be used in its place. The Southam family were happy with the name change, as they felt the Aspers were not running the chain within the traditions of that brand. Canwest News Service (CNS) began operating in Winnipeg in the second week of February 2003, replacing Southam Newspapers from bylines and mastheads. CNS moved its expanded operations to Ottawa in April 2007.

=== 2010: Postmedia buys Canwest ===
Although defunct for seven years, Southam's remnants were sold by Canwest on July 13, 2010, when its newspaper publishing division was spun off into a new company, Postmedia Network Ltd., led by National Post CEO, Paul Godfrey. Canwest's broadcasting division, Canwest Global Media, was sold to Shaw Media earlier in the year, after an attempt by the Asper family to regain the company in court failed on February 19, 2010. Shaw closed out the deal when they came to an agreement with Goldman-Sachs regarding Canwest's speciality TV channels on May 3, 2010. The Canadian Radio and Television Commission (CRTC) approved the deal on October 22, 2010, and the deal was finalized on October 27, 2010, meaning Canwest Global Communications Inc. was no more.

== Criticism ==
The Asper-owned Southam newspaper empire faced criticism when it fired Russell Mills as publisher of the Ottawa Citizen, allegedly for criticizing Prime Minister Jean Chrétien, who was a good friend of Izzy Asper. Around the same time, the Southam family, and some Southam News journalists, signed their names to public advertisements criticizing Canwest's head office for centralizing editorial control, with must-carry opinion pieces from management. According to the Toronto Star, this protest made it easier for Asper to drop the Southam name from its newspaper chain and put his own stamp on the company.

== See also ==
- Canada (Director of Investigation and Research) v. Southam Inc.
