= Asper =

Asper or ASPER may refer to:

== Coins ==
- Akçe, an Ottoman silver coin, similar to the aspron, known as asper or aspre in Europe
- Aspron, from Latin asper a type of late Byzantine silver or billon coins

== Education ==
- Asper School of Business, part of the University of Manitoba in Winnipeg, Canada
- Australian School of Petroleum and Energy Resources (ASPER), in Adelaide, South Australia

== Places ==
- Asper, Belgium, a Belgian village belonging to the municipality of Gavere
- Asper, Missouri, a ghost town in the US

== Other uses ==
- Asper (') breathing mark in romanization of Greek
- Asper (surname)

== See also ==
- Bothrops asper, a species of pit vipers
