= Scott Anderson =

Scott Anderson may refer to:

== Entertainment ==
- Scott Anderson (writer) (born 1959), American war correspondent and novelist
- Scott E. Anderson (born 1964), American visual effects artist
- Scott S. Anderson, writer and director of the film The Best Two Years
- Scott Anderson, lead singer of the Canadian alternative rock band Finger Eleven
- Scott Anderson (Hollyoaks), a character in UK soap opera Hollyoaks

== Sports ==
- Scott Anderson (American football) (born 1951), American football player with the Minnesota Vikings
- Scott Anderson (athlete) (born 1974), track athlete
- Scott Anderson (baseball) (born 1962), former MLB pitcher
- Scott Anderson (field hockey) (born 1968), goalkeeper from New Zealand
- Scott Anderson (rugby league) (born 1986), Australian rugby league footballer
- Scott Anderson (sailor) (born 1954), Australian sailor
- Scott Anderson (racing driver) (born 1989), American racing driver
- Scotty Anderson (born 1979), former American football wide receiver

== Politics ==
- A. Scott Anderson (1904–1971), mayor of Richmond, Virginia
- Scott Anderson (Canadian politician), member of parliament
- Scott Anderson, mayor of Gilbert, Arizona

== Others ==
- Scott Anderson (physicist) (1913–2006), founder of APL Engineered Materials
- Scott D. Anderson (1965–1999), pilot, author, and adventurer
- Scott Keir Anderson (born 1963), Senior Vice-president of Canwest
- Scott Charles Anderson, programmer, author, illustrator
