= Royal Commission on Newspapers =

Canadian Royal Commission

- Also known as: Kent Commission
- Commissioner: Thomas Worrall Kent (Chair); Laurent Picard; Borden Spears
- Inquiry period: September 3, 1980 – June 1, 1981

The Royal Commission on Newspapers, popularly known as the Kent Commission, was a Canadian Royal Commission chaired by Tom Kent. It was created in 1980 in response to growing concerns over concentration of media ownership in Canada. The Commission's final report was delivered in 1981.

Much of the impetus for the creation of the commission was the virtually simultaneous closure, on August 26–27, 1980, of two major daily newspapers: the Ottawa Journal (owned by the Thomson Corporation) and the Winnipeg Tribune (owned by Southam Inc.). These closures gave each chain a monopoly in the two markets, Southam with the Ottawa Citizen and Thomson with the Winnipeg Free Press. The resulting allegations of collusion prompted the Canadian government to launch the Kent Commission.

== 1979-1980: Reshaping of Canada's newspaper industry ==
When FP Publications Ltd. closed The Montreal Star – at one time, Canada's largest circulation newspaper until the 1950s – in September 1979, it started a chain reaction of consolidation within the Canadian newspaper industry. The consolidation ended when Southam and Thomson traded papers in various locations across Canada in August 1980. Next, in January 1980, Thomson Newspapers Ltd. bought FB Publications Ltd., which included its chain, Canadian Newspapers Limited Partnership, that at the time, owned Toronto's The Globe and Mail, the Winnipeg Free Press, two Alberta papers, and a 50 percent share of Pacific Press Ltd which controlled two of Victoria, British Columbia newspapers, The Daily Colonist and The Victoria Times.

In early April 1980, the FP Publications brand was retired, and merged with Thomson under the Thomson Newspapers brand. In late April 1980, Thomson Newspaper bought the remaining FP Publication shares from Newsco Investments Ltd. – controlled by former Globe and Mail owner, R. Howard Webster – giving them 100 percent control of the company and its properties.

By June 1980, the ramifications of the Montreal Star closing and Thomson's acquisition of the Star's parent company, FP Publications began to emerge. Southam Inc. had to sell Thomson Newspapers one-third of Montreal's The Gazette to acquire the assets of the now closed Star paper. Southam Inc. acted on the option to purchase from FP the Star's assets, including its printing plant, for $16 million. Thomson, the successor company to FP, exercised its option to purchase a one-third ownership stake in The Gazette on June 12, 1980, as part of the agreement between Southam and FP.

=== August 1980: Closures, and Monopoly ===
Southam decided to close The Winnipeg Tribune on August 27, 1980, and Thomson Newspapers bought its assets. Thomson also closed The Ottawa Journal around the same time as the Winnipeg Tribune, leaving Southam's The Citizen as the only English-language newspaper in that market. The August 27, 1980 deals gave Southam monopolies in English-language newspaper markets such as Montreal (The Gazette), Ottawa (The Citizen), and in the Vancouver market (The Province & The Vancouver Sun) when they bought both Thomson's minority shares in The Gazette and their 50 percent share in Pacific Press Ltd for $57,250,000.

Critics of the largest consolidation in Canadian newspaper history, up to that time, called it a failure in the Canadian government's anti-combines legislation. Federal Opposition Leader, Joe Clark, called for a federal inquiry into Southam and Thomson's dealings. But the publishers of the independent The Leader-Post and The Saskatoon Star-Phoenix thought the closures of The Journal and The Tribune might actually serve the public good better with one strong, and financially secure paper in each major urban centre, rather than two struggling ones.

== Bibliography ==
- Canada. (1981). Royal Commission on Newspapers. Hull Que.: Available from Canadian Govt. Pub. Centre Supply and Services Canada. ISBN 978-0-660-10954-1.
- Creery, Tim (Spring 1984). "Out of Commission:Why the Kent recommendations have been trashed. An insider's report". Ryerson Review of Journalism. ISSN 0838-0651. Archived from the original on March 20, 2012.
- Keshen, Richard; Macaskill, Kent (2000). "I Told You So": Newspaper Ownership in Canada and the Kent Commission Twenty Years Later". American Review of Canadian Studies. 30 (3): 315–325. doi:10.1080/02722010009481056. ISSN 0272-2011.
- Kent, Tom (October 2002). "Concentration with Convergence-Goodbye, Freedom of the Press" (PDF). Policy Options. 23 (7). ISSN 0226-5893. Archived from the original (PDF) on October 21, 2007.
