= Manitoba archaeological regulations =

Manitoba archaeology regulations control archaeology-related activities in the province of Manitoba.

== The Heritage Resources Act ==
The minister, a member of the Executive Council, may designate a site as a heritage site if the minister is convinced that the location/site represents heritage resources, human remains that have either been discovered in an area of believed to be in an area. The area must be an important aspect of historic or prehistoric history of the province or of the peoples and or cultures contained within the province. Sites that are adjacent to known sites and could enhance or provide greater information associated with the known heritage sites are also eligible for declaration of heritage sites by the minister.

At least sixty days before the minister makes his official designation of the area as a heritage site, he must serve the lessee or the owner of the site declaring his intention to designate the site a heritage site of the province, the minister must also publish a copy of the notice of intent in no less than two news paper issues, or two different newspapers that are in circulation around the region in which the site is located.

Upon receiving the notice of intent, the owner of the land can either chose to accept or reject the issue, if there is no issue of an objection by the end of the sixty-day waiting period the minister is able to declare the site officially a heritage site. If the owner chooses to object he has 30 days from the issue of the notice of intent to file a declaration of objection. Upon the issue of an objection a hearing is scheduled and conducted in front of a municipal board that then makes a recommendation to the minister who has the final decision and will either decide to not designate the area a heritage site or to follow through with his declaration of the site. If the minister is unable to make a decision the matter is referred to the Lieutenant Governor in Council. Appeals of the decision can also be made after a verdict is determined.

Any heritage site or site of which intent has been declared must perform a heritage impact assessment, under which the impact of excavating and recovering heritage items is assessed, the Minister issues a permit, if it is determined that heritage items will be harmed or destroyed in a project, either the excavation of or construction on a site then the minister has the power to issue an order to cease all work, activities, or development of the project. The minister can either issue a permit to continue work, or deny the development of an area; the minister also holds the right to waiver the necessity of a heritage impact assessment. No work can be conducted on a site unless the minister has issues a permit. The minister may also issue certain stipulations with the permit, such as the maintenance/preservation of the site by the owner/lessee.

If one finds a heritage item, or artifact on public land then it is determined under the Manitoba government that the custody of the object is given to the finder, although if the object is discovered don private land the object belongs to the owner of the land. No person is allowed to harm or destroy heritage items regardless of possession or not. Any person who harms or destroys an object under the Manitoba Heritage Act can be convicted by a judge and ordered to pay for the restoration of the object that was harmed. Any individual who breaks any aspect of the Act is susceptible to fines ranging from CAD$5000.00 - $50,000.00.

== Canada-Manitoba Agreement for Environmental Assessment Harmonization ==
In 1994 Canada and Manitoba commit to the concept and use of sustainable development in their governments, and recognize the importance of integrating environmental and economic activities. In doing so Canada and Manitoba agree to recognizes jurisdictions between the two levels of government when aspects of environmental assessment projects rulings are required. The two levels of government agree to work together in order to ensure that projects are conducted under the set requirements of both the Canadian Environmental Assessment Act as well as Manitoba’s Environment Act. Under this agreement both parties conceded to work together on such issues using aspects of 'Harmonization' in order to achieve maximum results.

By undertaking this agreement, Canada and Manitoba are attempting to cultivate cooperation between Federal and Provincial governments where environmental assessment is concerned. By doing this the two parties hope to achieve an improved level of efficiency of both public and private resources. Another aspect of this agreement is the attempt to establish a system of roles of responsibilities between federal and provincial governments including accountability issues.

There is a heavy emphasis on cooperative work between the two groups every move is met with approval or acknowledgement from the other party. Jurisdiction, ownership, responsibilities are all negotiated constantly between the two groups; the groups even give notice to one another about their participation in assessments. When the two groups are both conducting surveys on the same location, they meet and determine a lead party based on the situation. In the end it is the parties (provincial or federal government) who determine the ‘completedness’ of a given project.

- Aboriginal Involvement: If a project is deemed to affect or involve an aboriginal group then it is made sure that the specific group or individual is notified so they may participate in any assessment acts taking place.

== Triggers ==
Triggers for assessments (reasons/causes for assessment) under these acts include: whenever a federal authority (any federal agency or department, including ministers and the Government of Canada) proposes a project, if a federal authority provides financial assistance that enables a project to be carried out; if the federal agency sells, leases, or transfers control in any form, of a piece of federal land in order to carry out a project; if the federal agency has to provide a license or a permit then an assessment must occur. If one or more of these requirements are met then an assessment must occur in order for the project to proceed, during the assessment the project will be placed on hold until approval or disapproval of the assessment is awarded.

These are not the only instances under which an assessment may have to be conducted; an assessment may also be conducted if the minister receives a petition form an individual or group requesting that the project have an assessment conducted. If the minister feels that the project warrants an assessment after reviewing the petition than they (the minister) may order that an assessment be held before any further work on the project continues.

== Aboriginal involvement ==
Aboriginal groups may become involved when: they feel there are certain aspects that should be included in the assessment process, or when the project or assessment process may potentially impact any established aboriginal or treaty rights. An assessment coordinator is in charge of notifying any aboriginal groups that they feel will be affected by an assessment, whether it is an infringement on aboriginal or treaty rights or anything they feel should be brought to the group’s attention. Aboriginal groups are invited to comment on the project or the project proposal, groups are prompted to make comments involving the assessment process, funds are made available for groups who wish to consult and or comment on the process, and finally the concerns of the aboriginal groups involved are carefully considered by the agency under which the assessment and or project falls.

== Human Rights Museum controversy ==
The Canadian Human Rights Museum, which is under construction in Winnipeg, Manitoba, was officially established in 2008 but has been in the works since approximately 2003. The Museum is located on the Assiniboine River and Red River. In recent years there has been a large amount of controversy surrounding the location of the museum, the museum is being constructed on one of the richest sites in the province for aboriginal artifacts. This creates an issue: a human rights museum being constructed on a lot that potentially holds a piece of history for a group of indigenous peoples.

A former archaeologist in the province came out and accused the museum and those behind its construction of "mistreating First Nations heritage." The museum did fund an archaeological dig held on the area prior to construction beginning, although those who oppose the building claim it was not enough. One of the Archaeologists involved stated that "only two percent of the artifacts buried at the site were recovered because the museum wouldn’t foot the bill for a larger dig." The protesters argue that the reason for the apparent shortcuts when it comes to preserving heritage is that the government has one of the weakest systems when it comes to the regulation of heritage items. Even the two percent of artifacts recovered were not handled properly according to some sources, while the funding for the initial dig was sufficient the museum was also supposed to help allocate the discovered artifacts to the museum of Manitoba as well but "as soon as they found out there were costs they cancelled that", thus leaving the artifacts unsorted and left sitting in some basement of a government building and not in a museum serving educational purposes.

To counter this, museum officials stated that they had met with aboriginal elders to discuss this project long before construction began in the area; in order to determine whether or not there were any "concerns about the project." The museum then proceeded to fund the archaeological dig which lasted almost half a year, costing them approximately half a million dollars, the museum also claims to have invested in further analysis of artifacts including carbon dating. Museum officials say that they have monitored the progress of the construction and are documenting any find that are made, and while there have been some discoveries in other locations the ground has proved to be void of any artifacts and any artifacts found have been 'tagged and bagged' and are being placed in storage awaiting the access of archaeologists who may be interested in them. The building itself is being constructed in a way that it is not directly settled on the ground surface and is not compressing the earth underneath the structure, in a sense rendering no harm to any artifacts that may be housed there and yet to be found. The museum is continuing to work with officials to make sure that any artifacts or heritage items found at the site are handled appropriately. The museum also pointed out that it has met all of the provinces guidelines for heritage sites.
