= Russell Mills (publisher) =

Canadian former media executive

Russell Andrew Mills (born July 14, 1944 in St. Thomas, Ontario) is a Canadian former media executive and a leader and advisor of several societies. Mills worked in the Ottawa Citizen for 31 years, the last 16 as the newspaper's publisher.

== Newspaper industry ==
Russell Mills began his career in journalism part-time from 1964 to 1967 at the London Free Press while studying sociology at the University of Western Ontario. He worked in the Oshawa Times between 1970-1971, before joining the Ottawa Citizen as a copyeditor. Starting from 1977, he had advanced from editor, then general manager in 1984, becoming publisher in 1986. He later became president responsible for 17 daily and many weekly newspapers distributed by the national Southam Newspaper Group, before returning to the Citizen.

In 1996, Conrad Black's Hollinger media group bought the controlling interest in Southam, which led to what was dubbed as a "renaissance" for the Citizen. Although not a national or Toronto-based paper, the Citizen was perceived as Southam's flagship, albeit in decline in the lead-up to Black's purchase. To address the 24 percent drop to 134,266 in weekday circulation over the previous four years, Mills met with Black at New York's Carlyle Hotel to discuss new directions. A few days later in an article in The Globe and Mail, Black described the changes he envisioned to the "overwhelming avalanche of soft, left, bland, envious pap which has poured like sludge through the centre pages of most of the Southam papers for some time."

Mills' plan called for less reliance on government and news-wire services in favour of original, authoritative content about local issues or industries that were of interest to readers. Neil Reynolds was hired as the Citizen's editor in December 1996 as part of the change.

== 2002 dismissal controversy ==
In 2002, Mills (then 57) was dismissed from the Citizen by CanWest Global Communications Corporation, following a publication of a story critical of Prime Minister Jean Chrétien and an editorial calling for Chrétien's resignation. The story was published the same day that CanWest Global chairman Izzy Asper had a meeting with Chrétien at the Parliamentary Press Gallery Dinner.

Mills claimed that he was dismissed because he failed to obtain approval from CanWest before publishing the editorial. However, CanWest's Leonard Asper, who was interviewed by the Canadian Broadcasting Corporation, said that the termination of Mills was a result of multiple violations over a period of time of principles and policies that had been set out for, and developed collaboratively with, the editors & publishers of their newspapers. Also, that he had allowed his editorial opinion to affect the news coverage at the Citizen and that under his leadership, the paper had become "homogeneous".

The dismissal generated a strong reaction in the Ottawa community and throughout Canada over concerns of press freedom and independence from corporate influence. On the day after the firing, former Councillor Karin Howard organized a protest in front of the Citizen building where five prominent individuals spoke against the firing." Reporters at the Citizen withheld their bylines from stories, Ottawa city council members denounced the firing, and some members of Parliament called for an investigation into the relationship between CanWest and Chrétien's Liberal Party government.

Within a week of his dismissal, 5,000 subscriptions were cancelled. In Parliament, NDP leader Alexa McDonough stated: "Russell Mills was fired because the Prime Minister's buddy happened to be his boss... That is downright dangerous to democracy. We need a full public inquiry into media concentration, ownership and convergence."

== Post-journalism ==
After dismissal from the Ottawa Citizen, Mills became a Nieman Fellow at Harvard University. In 2002, Mills received an Honorary Doctor of Laws degree from Carleton University for services to the community and the newspaper industry; he was also awarded with the Queen's Golden Jubilee Medal for services to Canada. Mills joined Algonquin College in 2003 as Dean of the Faculty of Arts, Media and Design.

In 2007, Mills was appointed (and reappointed in 2012) chairman of the National Capital Commission (NCC). The NCC is responsible for planning and participating in the development, conservation, and improvement of Canada's capital region. Before his appointment, Mills had criticized NCC for its secrecy.

Mills is president of the Michener Awards Foundation for public service journalism, a director of the Canadian Film Institute and of the Canadian Battlefields Foundation and an adjudicator on the Canadian Broadcast Standards Council.
