= James Travers (journalist) =

Canadian journalist

James Travers (1948 or 1949 – March 3, 2011) was a Canadian journalist, best known as an editor and political correspondent for the Toronto Star.

== Biography ==
Born in Hamilton, Ontario, Travers began his journalism career in 1972 with the Oakville Journal Record in Oakville. He later joined Southam Newspapers, working as a foreign correspondent covering Africa and the Middle East. He served as the editor of the Ottawa Citizen from 1991 to 1996, when he resigned shortly after Southam sold the paper to Hollinger.

He joined the Toronto Star as an editor the following year, later returning to column writing as the paper's national affairs columnist. He won a National Newspaper Award in 2009 for a column titled "The quiet unravelling of Canadian democracy".

Following the announcement of his death, tributes were delivered in the House of Commons of Canada by several political figures, including Stephen Harper, Michael Ignatieff and Bob Rae.

Friends and colleagues of Jim Travers have established a fellowship fund to finance significant foreign reporting projects by Canadian journalists – staffers, freelancers or students – working in any medium. The fund has been established to make an annual award of $25,000 to cover travel, reporting and research expenses and a stipend for a journalist.
