= Meyer Brownstone =

Canadian activist and academic (1922–2019)

Meyer Brownstone (June 26, 1922 – April 3, 2019) was a Canadian activist, civil servant, and academic, particularly notable for his longtime involvement with Oxfam Canada.

== Early life ==
Brownstone was born in Winnipeg in 1922 to a poor Jewish socialist family. His parents were Olia Brownstone (née Roseman) and Charles Brownstone. His siblings were Hannah (married to Dr. Norman Hirt), Sam (married to Odette, parents of Justice Harvey Brownstone) and Shieky (married to Ellen). He was a cousin of lawyer and activist Yude Henteleff.

In his youth, he worked in the gold mines of Red Lake, Ontario in order to pay for his schooling. Earlier, he had worked on his uncle's farm where he tried to organize the Ukrainian women working in the field into a trade union, to his uncle's dismay.

== Government of Saskatchewan ==
From 1947 until 1964 Meyer Brownstone served as a civil servant in the government of Saskatchewan.

== Involvement with Oxfam ==
Meyer Brownstone became the chair of Oxfam Canada in 1975. For his work with Oxfam Canada, he was the 1986 recipient of the Pearson Medal of Peace. Meyer was Chair Emeritus for Oxfam Canada at the time of his death.

=== Central America ===
Faced with the numerous conflicts in Central America in the 1970s and 1980s, Meyer Brownstone was deeply involved in the region. From 1981 to 1985, Brownstone participated in several observer missions to the refugee camps of Colomancagua, El Tesoro, Mesa Grande, and La Virtud in Honduras, documenting the life and struggles of the refugees fleeing the Salvadoran Civil War. He was head of a 1985 mission sponsored by Oxfam Canada and the International Committee of Voluntary Agencies to investigate reports of an assault by Honduran troops on the Salvadoran refugees at Colomancagua.

In 1986 and 1987 Brownstone participated in two missions to El Salvador, working with the Salvadoran government and the Farabundo Martí National Liberation Front. Brownstone also participated in Oxfam Canada missions in Nicaragua during this time.

=== Namibia and South Africa ===
During the dismantling of apartheid in South Africa and the South African administered territory of Namibia (then known as South-West Africa), Meyer Brownstone played a central role in a number of international observer missions. In July 1989, Brownstone was appointed spokesperson/coordinator of the Canadian Council on International Cooperation's mission to Namibia. The primary goal of the mission was to monitor the withdrawal of South African troops following the end of the Namibian War of Independence. A few months later, Brownstone was appointed head of the Canadian mission that oversaw the first Namibian parliamentary election in November 1989.

In the lead up to the first South African election following the end of apartheid, Meyer Brownstone participated in two observer missions to South Africa. Brownstone and his team were tasked with increasing voter awareness, enlisting staff for the electoral process, determining the logistics for the election, and monitoring political violence. In 1994, Brownstone was appointed head of the Canadian mission to oversee the election itself. Among the Canadians on the mission were Ed Broadbent, former leader of the federal New Democratic Party, and Flora MacDonald, a former cabinet minister. The electoral mission was tasked with peace monitoring, election monitoring, advising and aiding the Independent Election Commission, and providing coordination with other international missions.

== Academic life ==
Meyer Brownstone was sequentially Professor of Political Science at the University of Toronto, where he headed the Centre for Urban and Community Studies, and Professor of Environmental Studies at York University in Toronto. He had earned a PhD at Harvard University.

== Death ==
Meyer Brownstone died in Toronto on April 3, 2019.
