= Calgary Herald =

Daily newspaper published in Calgary, Alberta, Canada

- Type: Daily newspaper (Tuesdays to Saturdays)
- Format: Broadsheet, digital
- Owner: Postmedia Network
- Editor-in-chief: Monica Zurowski
- Editor: Lorne Motley
- Founded: 31 August 1883
- Language: English
- Headquarters: P.O. Box 37042 RPO Mayland Heights Calgary, Alberta, Canada T2E 8V1
- Circulation: 18,379 weekdays 20,675 Saturdays (as of 2024)
- Sister newspapers: Edmonton Journal
- ISSN: 0828-1815 (print); 1197-2823 (web)
- OCLC number: 29533985
- Website: calgaryherald.com

Former logo

The Calgary Herald is a daily newspaper published in Calgary, Alberta, Canada. Publication began in 1883 as The Calgary Herald, Mining and Ranche Advocate, and General Advertiser. It is owned by the Postmedia Network.

== History ==
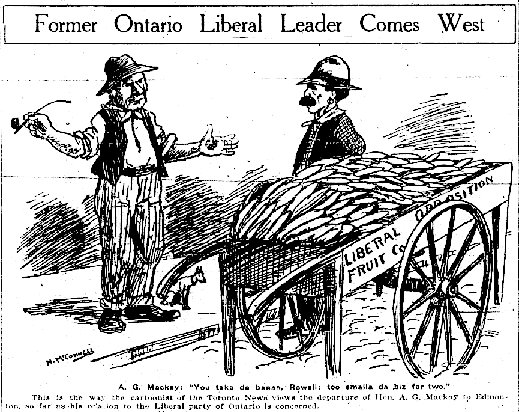
Political cartoon of Alexander Grant MacKay moving from Ontario to Alberta, Calgary Herald, 26 May 1912

The Calgary Herald, Mining and Ranche Advocate and General Advertiser started publication on 31 August 1883 in a tent at the junction of the Bow and Elbow by Thomas Braden, a school teacher, and his friend, Andrew Armour, a printer, and financed by "a five-hundred- dollar interest-free loan from a Toronto milliner, Miss Frances Ann Chandler." It started as a weekly paper with 150 copies of only four pages created on a handpress that arrived 11 days earlier on the first train to Calgary. A year's subscription cost $3.

When Hugh St. Quentin Cayley became editor 26 November 1884 the Herald moved out of the tent and into a shack. Cayley quickly became partner and editor.

At that time, Braden and Armour found that westerners wanted more updated information about the growing Riel Rebellion in the Northwest Territories. One year later, the Calgary Herald went daily. To meet demand, a new press was purchased that could print up to 400 papers an hour if a strong man was turning the crank. The paper was still experiencing growing pains and financial uncertainty in 1894, when J. J. Young took over the paper, saving it from near bankruptcy. During those early years, the newspaper was not so much published as improvised, with updated news provided by bulletins from passengers on the Canadian Pacific Railway.

— Diane Howard, Encyclopedia of the Great Plains, 2004

Eventually, the publisher's name was changed to Herald Publishing Company Limited and began publishing the Calgary Daily Herald, a daily version of the newspaper, on 2 July 1885.

In 1897 the editor of the Herald was impressed by the "humor and witty journalistic prose" of Bob Edwards, then one of Canada's leading journalists, with a reputation as a critic of government and society and as a "supporter of the emancipation of women and the temperance crusade," and reprinted some of his articles in the Herald.

From February 1890 to August 1893 and from December 1894 to September 1895, the weekly paper appeared as the Wednesday issue of the daily paper. Publication of the daily paper was suspended between 21 September 1893 and 13 December 1894. Publication of a daily edition began in fall 1885. Publication of the Calgary Daily Herald under the name Calgary Herald began in February 1939, as an afternoon edition until April 1985. It is now delivered in the morning.

In January 1908, the Southam Company purchased a majority interest in the Calgary Herald.

Frank Swanson, was Calgary Herald publisher from 1962 to 1982, when he retired after 44 years in journalism. During World War II, as war correspondent, he covered the Nuremberg war crimes trials. He worked for the Southam Newspapers group for the Edmonton Journal and The Citizen in Ottawa. Frank Swanson was Calgary Herald's publisher until his retirement in July 1982. Swanson oversaw the move of their headquarters from downtown Calgary to a "$70 million plant on a hill overlooking the intersection of Deerfoot and Memorial."

J. Patrick O'Callaghan (1925–1996), "an outspoken advocate of a free and vocal press" and publisher of The Windsor Star, The Ottawa Citizen, Edmonton Journal, was publisher of the Calgary Herald from 1982 to 1989. In 1994 he served as co-chairman of the Canadian Task Force on the Magazine Industry that recommended stronger enforcement of measures designed to protect Canada's magazine industry.

Kevin Peterson, joined the Calgary Herald in 1969, first as a political reporter for the following six years, then a series of editorial positions and finally as publisher from 1989 to 1995. "[U]nder his leadership, the Herald revamped every area of content, re-engineered its circulation function, and completely reorganized the complex process of selling, designing, and placing customers' advertising."

In 1996 the paper was sold to the Hollinger Corporation under Conrad Black. Ken King, then-publisher of The Calgary Sun with an advertising background, became publisher of the Calgary Herald in February 1996. By the time he left the newspaper business King had served for thirty years including senior executive positions with several of Canada's leading newspapers, as president and publisher of the Calgary Sun and Calgary Herald. A few months after King's appointment as a publisher, Conrad Black acquired the Southam newspaper chain and the Calgary Herald.In November 2000, the Herald became part of Southam Newspapers.

In July 2000, CanWest Global made Canadian media history with its $3.5 billion purchase of Hollinger's newspaper and internet assets, acquiring "136 daily and weekly newspapers," [which included the Calgary Herald and] half of The National Post, 13 large big-city dailies, 85 trade publications and directories in the Southam Magazine and Information Group."

By 2003, Southam "was fully absorbed into CanWest Global Communications." By 2003, Izzy Asper had built "CanWest Global into a profitable media powerhouse with annual revenues in excess of $2 billion and net earnings of $90 million."

Canwest entered bankruptcy protection in late 2009. and announced Tuesday 13 July 2010 that its newspaper subsidiary has successfully emerged from creditor protection with new owners Postmedia.

In July 2000, CanWest Global made Canadian media history with its $3.5 billion purchase of Hollinger's newspaper and internet assets, acquiring "136 daily and weekly newspapers," [which included the Calgary Herald and] half of The National Post, 13 large big-city dailies, 85 trade publications and directories in the Southam Magazine and Information Group."

By 2003, Southam "was fully absorbed into CanWest Global Communications." By 2003, Izzy Asper had built "CanWest Global into a profitable media powerhouse with annual revenues in excess of $2 billion and net earnings of $90 million."

Malcolm Kirk, was appointed the Herald's publisher in August, 2006.

The Herald also publishes Neighbours, a weekly community newspaper that is distributed with the Herald in some parts of Calgary, and Swerve, a weekly magazine-style pullout. In the spring of 2005, the Herald joined several other CanWest Global affiliates in launching Dose, a free daily newspaper targeted at younger commuters; it was discontinued as a print publication after a year.

Canwest entered bankruptcy protection in late 2009. and announced Tuesday 13 July 2010 that its newspaper subsidiary has successfully emerged from creditor protection with new owners Postmedia.

Postmedia purchased the Calgary Herald from Canwest in 2010. Postmedia, backed by a New York hedge fund, holds some of Canada's largest daily newspapers, including the Post, Vancouver Sun, Calgary Herald, and Ottawa Citizen.

By October 2011, Postmedia had cut about 500 full-time jobs across the many newspapers it owns to deal with the debt it inherited with the 2010 purchase. CEP union spokesman Peter Murdoch said, "This is hardly of net benefit to Canadians, their communities or the critical flow of information in a democratic society."

Since it emerged from bankruptcy court protection in July, 2010, Postmedia has erased 750 jobs, or 14 per cent of its work force, bringing to 1,700 the total number of staff eliminated at the company since 2008.

— Globe & Mail 2011

By 2011, the Calgary Herald newsroom was remodelled to enable teams to work on its websites and social media platforms like Twitter as advertising revenue migrated from printed to digital media. The Calgary Herald, like Postmedia's 45 other metropolitan and community newspapers, was struggling financially. Postmedia's print circulation and advertising sales, which accounted for 90 percent of its revenue, declined, its debt load was heavy, which forced it to cut costs aggressively cut. In spite of the digital innovations at the Calgary Herald in which staff did not have the protection of a union, and there were even deeper job cuts. Postmedia met with union-resistance at its other papers.

In August 2010 Paul Godfrey President and CEO of Postmedia Network announced the appointment of Guy Huntingford as the publisher of the Calgary Herald as it "continues its transformation into an integrated multimedia brand." In April 2013 Godfrey announced that was "eliminating the publisher position at its chain of 10 newspapers, which includes the National Post, the Montreal Gazette, the Ottawa Citizen" and the Calgary Herald in a cost-cutting measure.

== Circulation ==
The Calgary Herald has seen like most Canadian daily newspapers a decline in circulation. Its total circulation dropped by 14 percent to 106,916 copies daily from 2009 to 2015.

Daily average

== Criticism ==
=== Ethics shift ===
In his report entitled "Exposing the Boss: A Study in Canadian Journalism Ethics" journalist Bob Bergen argued that there were dramatic changes during this period. Bergen claimed that the Herald aligned itself "with the Calgary business community and entered into partnerships with the Calgary Flames hockey team, the Calgary Stampeders football team, the city of Calgary's Expo 2005 bid, and enhanced the newspaper's existing sponsorship of the Calgary Exhibition and Stampede." Bergen claimed that by October four new conservative columnists "Peter Stockland former editor of The Calgary Sun hired by King and, from eastern Canada, Giles Gherson on national economics, Andrew Coyne on national affairs, and Barbara Amiel, a journalist who was also Black's wife. King explained the new conservative columnists complemented the Herald's other columnists including liberal Catherine Ford and Robert Bragg, who had left-leaning political views."

=== Labour issues ===
Changes, including downsizing and cut wages, introduced by the Hollinger Corporation after its purchase of the Calgary Herald in 1996, led to Herald staff voting to unionize in 1998 under the Communications, Energy and Paperworkers Union of Canada. On 8 November 1999, unionized staff at the Herald, including reporters, went on strike. The strike lasted until July 2000, during which many longtime Herald reporters left the newspaper. While some accepted a severance package, others returned to work on the condition that the union be dissolved. Many seasoned journalists were replaced by inexperienced staff and it took several years for the Herald to rebuild its readership after the strike. Former Herald staff who left during or as a result of the strike can be found working for other publications, most notably the weekly business-oriented publication Business Edge.

On 25 February 2011 the Communications, Energy and Paperworkers Union of Canada (CEP) asked the federal government to review (under the Investment Canada Act) the 2010 purchase of the newspaper by Postmedia Network.

== Awards ==
A June 2010 series, "Worked to Death" on the "human costs of Alberta's economic boom" by Chris Varcoe and research by Kelly Cryderman and Renata D'Aliesio, won the 2010 Michener Award, one of the highest distinctions in Canadian journalism. In his June 14, 2011 acceptance speech, Varcoe acknowledged the support of the newspaper, particularly editors Lorne Motley and Monica Zurowski, who invested resources for over a year to "important civic journalism". The series was the culmination of collaboration work by a "photographers, researchers, editors, graphic artists and online journalists" that spanned a year. The series resulted in changes in the way in which the Alberta government improved the province's workplace safety enforcement system.

== Notable journalists ==
- Bruce Dowbiggin

== See also ==
- History of Canadian newspapers
- List of newspapers in Canada
- List of the largest Canadian newspapers by circulation

== Citations ==
=== References ===
- Mather, John (Summer 2007). "Hot Prospects". Ryerson Review of Journalism. ISSN 0838-0651. OCLC 62576541. Archived from the original on 19 August 2011.
- Sydney Suissa (1983). From Canvas Walls to Marble Halls: A History of the First Thirty Years of the Calgary Herald. University of Calgary (Bachelor thesis).
