= Yude Henteleff =

Canadian lawyer and human rights activist (1927–2024)

Yehuda "Yude" M. Henteleff, KC (June 7, 1927 – December 8, 2024) was a Canadian lawyer, human rights advocate and environmentalist.

== Life and career ==
Henteleff was born in Winnipeg, Manitoba on June 7, 1927, as the son of a Russian-born Jewish couple, Nathan Henteleff and Rose Roseman. The parents ran a market garden on the Red River in Manitoba, on a site previously owned by Nathan's father Lieb (Abraham Leonard). The site is now Henteleff Park.

Yude obtained a Bachelor of Science in Agriculture in 1947 and then a Bachelor of Laws in 1951 from the University of Manitoba. He was a founding partner of the legal firm Pitblado LLP of Winnipeg, following a merger of the firm he founded in 1965 with fellow Jewish lawyer Harold Buchwald. Henteleff's work on the rights of children with cognitive and physical disabilities, and on workplace discrimination, including sexual harassment, led to landmark Supreme Court of Canada decisions. He has volunteered in human rights projects in many parts of the world, including Colombia, Bolivia, Thailand, South Africa, Kyrgyzstan and Israel.

Among his many community affiliations, he served on the advisory council for Canadian Lawyers for International Human Rights, the professional advisory committee of the Learning Disabilities Association of Canada, the Mental Health Commission of Canada's national framework review committee for child and adolescent mental health and the Winnipeg Arts Council. He chaired the Canadian Museum for Human Rights content advisory committee from 2009–10.

The Yude Henteleff Mishpatim Scholarship Fund at Hebrew University and the Yude M. Henteleff Prizes in Human Rights and Civil Liberties at the University of Manitoba are named in his honour.

Henteleff had four children, including filmmaker Saul Henteleff, and Childhood Educator Beth Henteleff. He is a cousin of palliative care pioneer Dr. Paul Henteleff and of the late Meyer Brownstone, former chair of Oxfam Canada. His grandchildren Jessie & Ariel Levine are both Award-winning scholars; respectively in the Theatrical Arts, and Ancient Archaeological Pottery Analysis of the Southern Levant.

Henteleff died on December 8, 2024, at the age of 97.

== Awards ==
1997: Named to the Order of Canada

1999: Lifetime Achievement Award from the Learning Disabilities Association of Canada

2002: Commemorative Medal for Her Majesty Queen Elizabeth II's Golden Jubilee

2002: Distinguished Service Award, Manitoba Bar Association

2006: Honorary doctorate of Law, University of Manitoba

2008: Human Rights Commitment Award of Manitoba
