= Canwest =

Former Canadian media company

2737469 Canada Inc.
- Final logo used from 2004 to 2010

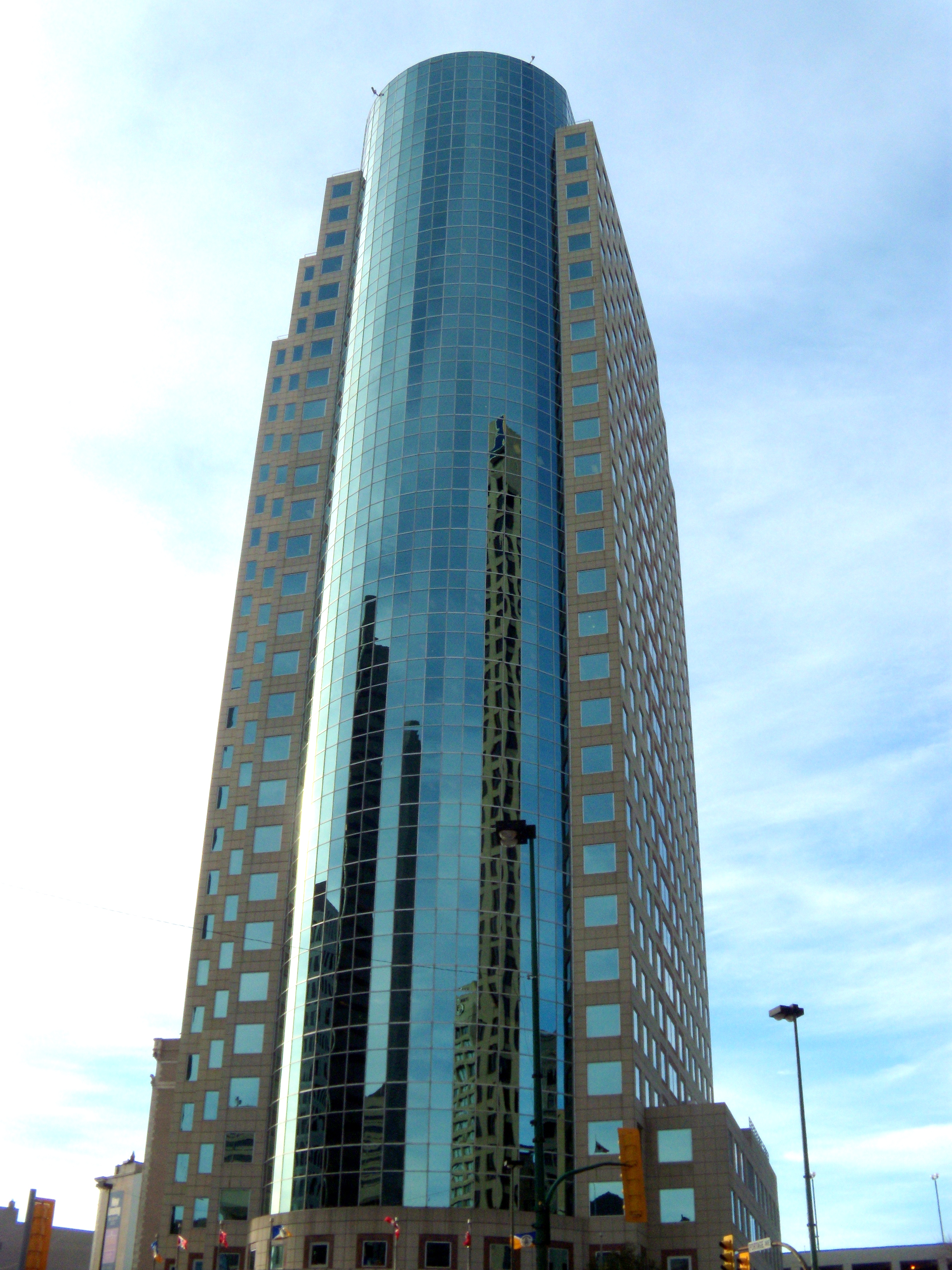
- Canwest's headquarters at 201 Portage Avenue
- Formerly: Canwest Global Communications Corporation
- Type: Public
- Traded as: TSX: CGS; TSX: CGS.A; NYSE: CWG
- Industry: Mass media
- Founded: 1974; 52 years ago
- Founder: Izzy Asper
- Defunct: October 27, 2010; 16 years ago (operations); May 27, 2013; 13 years ago (dissolution)
- Fate: Bankruptcy and liquidation: Broadcast assets were sold to Shaw Communications; Newspaper assets were sold to creditors to form Postmedia Network; The assetless shell then began bankruptcy proceedings under the Bankruptcy and Insolvency Act
- Successor: Shaw Media (broadcasting) and Postmedia Network (publishing spin-off)
- Headquarters: 201 Portage Avenue, Winnipeg, Manitoba, Canada
- Area served: Canada, Australia, New Zealand, Ireland, United Kingdom, Turkey
- Key people: Derek H. Burney (chairman of the board)
- Revenue: CA$2.867 billion (2009)
- Operating income: CA$197 million (2009)
- Net income: CA$−1.689 billion (2009)
- Total assets: CA$3.876 billion (Q1 2010)
- Total equity: CA$−449 million (Q1 2010)
- Number of employees: 12,072 (May 2009)
- Website: canwest.com (archived 2010-09-18)

Canwest Global Communications Corporation, which operated under the corporate name Canwest, was a major Canadian media conglomerate based in Winnipeg, Manitoba, with its head offices at Canwest Place (now called 201 Portage). It held radio, television broadcasting, and publishing assets in several countries, primarily Canada.

Canwest was founded in 1974 by Izzy Asper through the formation of CIII-TV in Toronto under the Global Television Network. The company expanded through the 1980s and 1990s, with the initial public offering in 1991 as a publicly traded corporation and the international expansion of its operations in Ireland, Australia, New Zealand, United Kingdom and Turkey. Throughout the years, under Leonard Asper, who became its president and CEO in 1999, Canwest grew into a major media powerhouse by acquiring media properties such as Western International Communications and the Southam Inc. newspaper publishing. In 2007, with Goldman Sachs, Canwest acquired the broadcasting arm of Alliance Atlantis.

After years of debt, Canwest began to slowly collapse in 2008, amid the Great Recession, and later entered bankruptcy protection in late 2009, which led to its breakup the following year. Its publishing interests formed the nucleus of Postmedia Network, founded by National Post CEO Paul Godfrey, while its broadcasting interests were sold to Shaw Communications, which later reorganized its media division as Shaw Media. On April 1, 2016, the broadcasting assets were subsumed into Corus Entertainment, an existing broadcasting firm also owned by the Shaw family.

Following the sale of assets, the company was renamed 2737469 Canada Inc., ceased to carry on business, and commenced bankruptcy proceedings under the Bankruptcy and Insolvency Act before finally being dissolved on May 27, 2013.

== History ==
=== Beginnings ===
In 1974, a group led by Israel Asper bought the assets of Pembina, North Dakota television station KCND-TV from broadcaster Gordon McLendon, moving the station to Winnipeg as an independent station, CKND-TV. Asper, through his company, Canwest, eventually bought out his partners in the Winnipeg station. A few months later, the Asper group joined a consortium that bought CKGN-TV, a network of six simulcasting transmitters across Ontario that carried many of CKND's programs and was known on-air as the Global Television Network. Canwest bought controlling interest in Global, now using the callsign CIII-TV, in 1985, thus becoming the first western-based owner of a major Canadian broadcaster. He acquired the remaining stock in 1989.

Canwest subsequently invested in or acquired other independent TV stations across Canada. Eventually, his station group became known as the "Canwest Global System." In 1997, Canwest bought a controlling interest in CKMI-TV, the privately owned CBC affiliate in Quebec City. Canwest then set up CKMI rebroadcasters in Montreal and Sherbrooke. With this move, Canwest's stations now had enough coverage of Canada that on August 18—the day CKMI officially disaffiliated from CBC—Canwest scrubbed all local brands from its stations, rebranding them as "The Global Television Network." Throughout the 1990s, Global (and its antecedents) held Canadian rights to hit U.S. series, such as Cheers, Friends, and Frasier.

Canwest also bought broadcasting assets internationally, including outlets in New Zealand, the Republic of Ireland, and Australia, although all were eventually sold off. In 1991, Canwest issued a successful initial public offering on the Toronto Stock Exchange. In June 1996, Canwest was listed on the New York Stock Exchange.

=== Beyond broadcasting and the newspapers ===
Lacking a presence in Alberta, the company set its sights on Western International Communications, which owned three independent stations in that province that carried Global's programming. It eventually bought the company's broadcasting assets in 2000. This not only boosted Global's coverage in western Canada, but prompted the establishment of a second over-the-air service, originally known as CH, since in some areas, the combined company had duplicate over-the-air coverage through multiple stations. Later that year, Canwest announced its acquisition of Southam Inc.'s newspaper chain from Conrad Black, in order to pursue a media convergence strategy.

The CanWest logo used from 1997 to 2008.

Canwest was initially slow to invest in specialty channels due to the strength of its terrestrial network. In 1999, seeking to change this, the company announced a deal to buy out the Canadian partners of NetStar Communications, owner of TSN, but was stymied by U.S. partner ESPN, which had veto power over such a sale. ESPN instead came to terms with Canwest's main rival, CTV, a longtime business partner of ESPN's parent company Disney, as an acceptable buyer, which the selling partners eventually agreed to.

In an effort to get into the entertainment business, the company had bought out producer and distributor Fireworks Entertainment in 1998, and gained interest in Seven Arts Pictures, a film production company. Canwest would end up selling its entertainment unit in 2005.

In 2005, Canwest launched a new website, Canada.com, which served as a digital media platform for its rebranded brands in the digital space. These brands encompassed various local news outlets, major newspapers, and other media entities. The brands were collectively presented under the "canada.com Network" and included the following (as listed in the website footer): Newspapers: National Post, Calgary Herald, Edmonton Journal, The Montreal Gazette, Ottawa Citizen, Regina Leader Post, The Saskatoon Star Phoenix, The Vancouver Sun, The Vancouver Province, Victoria Times Colonist, The Windsor Star, Dose, Vancouver Island Newspaper, VANNEET Newspaper; Television: Global, CH, Prime TV, Fox Sports World Canada, Lonestar, Mystery, Xtreme Sports, Deje View, mentv, Cool TV; Radio: CoolFM 99.1, 91.5 The Beat; Marketplace: working.com, driving.ca, connecting, celebrating, remembering, homes. The website experience revolved around news, city guides, activities, and events to enhance advertising revenue. The site was developed by Cossette/Fjord, based in Toronto, Canada, in 2005.

In October 2005, Canwest's Canadian newspapers were sold into an IPO trust, and it sold 25.8% of Canada's newspapers for CA$550 million. Attached to the Canadian newspaper IPO was $850 million in long-term debt. Canwest bought back the 25.8% newspaper trust IPO (and debt) in November 2008, for cash considerations of $495 million. In April 2006, Canwest acquired four radio stations in Turkey: Super FM, Metro FM, Joy FM and Joy Turk FM from The Turkish Savings and Deposit Insurance Fund, for aggregate cash consideration of US$61 million.

The company was already one of the largest owners of Canadian local TV stations when Canwest and Goldman Sachs, in 2007, announced they would jointly acquire Canadian producer and competing broadcaster, Alliance Atlantis, and its massive stable of wide-distribution specialty channels. Under the deal, Canwest took control of the broadcasting portion of AAC, although Goldman Sachs remained a major investor in those assets. Goldman retained or resold the remaining pieces of AAC, with the distribution arm soon re-emerging as Alliance Films.

Canwest executives testified in the Canadian Radio-television and Telecommunications Commission hearings over fee-for-carriage, requesting that the commission force cable and satellite companies to pay for their signals without passing the fees on to their subscribers. In his testimony, Canwest president Leonard Asper blamed the current rules for the poor financial condition of Canada's broadcast television stations, a position which has subsequently been adopted and addressed through rule changes by the CRTC and FCC.

=== Restructuring, creditor protection, bankruptcy, and liquidation ===
Canwest's various acquisitions took a significant financial toll. As early as 2002, most of Canwest's operating income was going to paying interest on its high-interest-rate debt. By 2007, the company's bonds were downgraded to junk status. By early 2009, it became clear the company's debt was not manageable during the Great Recession, forcing Canwest into an extended set of negotiations with its lenders and a series of cost-cutting moves. The company's income statements reported net losses in 2008 and 2009, even though its operating activities were profitable (before taxes, interest, and non-operating charges: C$197 million in 2009, vs. C$428 million in 2008).

In May 2009, Canwest sold off its four radio stations in Turkey to Spectrum Medya.

On August 31, 2009, Canwest shut down its secondary system E! (the former CH). Three of the former E! owned-and-operated stations – CHCH Hamilton, CHEK Victoria, and CJNT Montreal – were sold to third parties, while a fourth, CHBC Kelowna, was converted to a Global station. The remaining station, CHCA Red Deer, was closed on the same date.

On September 24, the company announced that it would sell its 50.1% stake in Ten Network Holdings for A$680 million, in order to pay down its significant debt. The sale of Canwest's Australian media operations reduced some CA$582 million in debt tied to the Australian TV network, raising the total value that Canwest could erase from its overall debt to more than C$1.2 billion. Before the Ten deal, Canwest held about CA$3.8 billion of debt on its balance sheet. In court documents, Goldman Sachs alleges "fraudulent" and "abusive" changes to the internal operation of Canwest in the days before it filed for creditor protection. As part of the filing, the Wall Street investment bank is seeking to undo these changes, and has also claimed that Canwest's creditors should return the CA$426 million they received from Canwest's balance sheet in September, after Canwest sold its stake in Ten.

On October 6, the company voluntarily filed for creditor protection under the Companies' Creditors Arrangement Act (CCAA), due to CA$4 billion mounting debt across radio, television broadcasting and publishing assets in several countries. At the same time, it announced it had agreed to a recapitalization transaction with some of its lenders, which would likely have required the approval of the Canadian Radio-television and Telecommunications Commission (CRTC). When completed, bondholders – led by hedge funds West Face Capital, GoldenTree Asset Management, and Beach Point Capital Management – would own a majority of shares, leaving existing shareholders, including the Asper family, with a total of 2.3% of the "new" Canwest. However, the Aspers were expected to invest a further C$15 million in the restructured entity.

In January 2010, Canwest's bonds commanded about 70 cents on the dollar. Canwest's bonds at one point traded for as little as 15 cents on the dollar. Several sources say that as Canwest notes increased fivefold in price, distressed debt funds took profits on part of their position, with Angelo Gordon among the buyers.

On February 3, 2010, it was reported that a group led by Golden Tree Asset Management LP complained that "it was unfairly frozen out of the auction of Canwest Limited Partnership."

As part of the transaction, Canwest and some of its subsidiaries, including Canwest Media Inc., The National Post Company, and Canwest Television LP (the licensee of Global, MovieTime, DejaView, and Fox Sports World Canada) filed for creditor protection under the Companies' Creditors Arrangement Act (CCAA). Canwest Limited Partnership, a subsidiary that owned the company's other newspaper assets and online properties, negotiated separately with creditors and was expected to file for creditor protection at a later date. Specialty channels operated in partnership with other companies (such as TVtropolis, Mystery TV, MenTV, and the former Alliance Atlantis properties) were also not included in the October 6 filing. Canwest shares were also suspended from trading on the TSX.

Canwest said that it was not being liquidated at this point, and the company insisted that the proceedings would make Canwest "a stronger industry competitor with a renewed financial outlook." Nevertheless, some analysts expected that the conglomerate would sell assets or be broken up entirely as the restructuring process continued, noting that the publishing division has a separate set of lenders. As it turned out, the company would indeed be broken up.

=== Sale of assets to Shaw and Postmedia ===
In February 2010, the company announced an agreement with Shaw Communications whereby the latter company would buy an 80% voting interest, and 20% equity interest, in the restructured entity, pending approvals from the Canadian Radio-television and Telecommunications Commission (CRTC) and others. The company's newspapers were not part of the Shaw deal and were already sold separately to Postmedia Network. However, the Asper family with Goldman and Catalyst made their own bid to retake Canwest with a $120 million bid in competition with the bid proposed by Shaw Communications. On February 25, 2010, it was announced that Shaw Communications had won a court battle to continue their plans to purchase assets & voting shares from Canwest. After the announcement, Shaw revealed that its investment amounted to a minimum of $95 million in exchange for 20 percent of the equity and an 80 percent voting interest in the restructured company.

Although Goldman, Catalyst, and the Aspers continued to work on their own bid after the Shaw agreement, Shaw announced a revised agreement, following court-ordered mediation, under which it would purchase the entirety of Canwest's broadcasting operations, including the portion owned by Goldman. This deal was later modified following a second court-ordered mediation to include a settlement agreement between Shaw, creditors, and the Official Ad Hoc Committee of Shareholders, led by the Aspers, Blott Asset Management, L.L.C. and two other hedge funds. This marked the first successful equity committee campaign in Canada under CCAA. A modified deal, including the settlement agreement, received the approval of the Ontario Superior Court on June 23, 2010, the Competition Bureau on August 13, 2010, and was given final approval from the CRTC on October 22, 2010, with Canwest delisting itself from the TSX and officially ceasing operations that same month. The final closing would officially occur in October 2011, following the official CMI Transition Order. Meanwhile, Shaw Communications reorganized Canwest into Shaw Media.

After bankruptcy proceedings concluded under the Bankruptcy and Insolvency Act, Canwest, by this point known as 2737469 Canada, Inc., finally dissolved on May 27, 2013, after 39 continuous years of operation. Asper, through his Syngus Corp. holding company, went on to establish Anthem Media Group in 2010 and has since grown into the portfolio through the ownership of Impact Wrestling, AXS TV, Fight Network and GameTV.

In April 2016, the Shaw Media assets were subsumed by Shaw's sister company Corus Entertainment.

== Corporate governance ==
=== Board of directors ===
The last members of the board of directors of the company were Derek Burney, David Drybrough, David Kerr, Leonard Asper, Izzy Asper, Lisa Pankratz, Frank McKenna, David Asper, and Gail Asper. Gail Asper, David Asper, and Lisa Pankratz resigned from the board, and from all other director and officer positions within Canwest and its subsidiaries, on February 10, 2010.

== Editorial controversies ==
Since the 2000 acquisition of the major former Canadian newspaper holdings of Conrad Black's Hollinger International (now Sun-Times Media Group), including Canwest News Service, opposition has been expressed by some journalists, union spokespersons, politicians, and pundits about Canwest's enforcement of its corporate editorial positions. A 2001 decision to run regular uniform national editorials in all metropolitan dailies (except National Post), whereby local editorial boards could not take local positions on subjects of national editorials, ignited major national controversy and was subsequently withdrawn.

Conflict over Canwest editorial control and policy has focused in particular on three issues:

- The Liberal Party of Canada. Since Israel Asper's leadership of the Manitoba Liberal Party, the Asper family has been identified with Liberal politics and politicians. In July 2001, Southam national affairs columnist Lawrence Martin was fired after a column of his critical of Liberal Prime Minister Jean Chrétien was not published. Russell Mills, long-time publisher of The Ottawa Citizen, was fired in June 2002 after the newspaper published a series of articles exposing a financial scandal involving Prime Minister Chrétien, and called on him to resign. Canwest newspapers and broadcast outlets in British Columbia were criticized for giving a "free ride" to the BC Liberal government of Premier Gordon Campbell, while coverage of the British Columbia New Democratic Party was criticized as being unfairly negative. However, as of 2006, at least one Asper family member (David Asper) was publicly supporting the Conservatives.
- The government of Israel and conflict in the Middle East. Veteran Montreal Gazette reporter Bill Marsden has said that the Aspers "do not want any criticism of Israel. We do not run in our newspaper op-ed pieces that express criticism of Israel and what it is doing." A study released in 2006 by the Near East Cultural and Educational Foundation of Canada found that the National Post was 83.3 times more likely to report an Israeli child's death than a Palestinian child's death in its news articles' headlines or first paragraphs. In 2008, Canwest launched a lawsuit against the Palestine Media Collective for producing a newspaper parody of The Vancouver Sun that satirized this bias. In 2004, the Reuters news agency protested after Canwest altered newswire stories about the Iraq war and the Israeli–Palestinian conflict, such that Reuters felt it had inserted Canwest's own bias under Reuters bylines. The changes were apparently made in accordance with a Canwest policy to label certain groups as terrorists. Ottawa Citizen, a newspaper in the Canwest chain, made similar changes to a story by the Associated Press.
- The Canwest editorial control and management itself. In December 2001, staff members at The Montreal Gazette launched a Gazette Newsroom web page with an open letter, titled Media Giant Silences Local Voices: Canadian Journalism Under Attack, that was signed by 77 Gazette journalists by January 23, 2002, opposing the national editorial policy, and the reporters among them participated in a byline strike, refusing to sign their names to their stories in the newspaper in protest. The Canwest management responded with a gag order. The next year, several journalists left The Halifax Daily News over similar conflicts, and ten journalists at The Regina Leader-Post were reprimanded or suspended after a byline strike to protest censorship of coverage of a speech in Regina by Toronto Star columnist and Canwest critic Haroon Siddiqui.

== See also ==
- Postmedia News
