= Thomas Worrall Kent =

Canadian politician (1922–2011)

Tom Kent CC
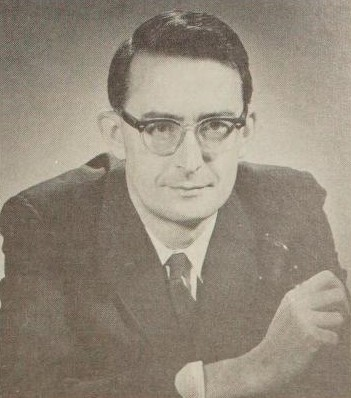
- Kent, c. 1968
- Born: Thomas Worrall Kent; April 3, 1922; Stafford, Staffordshire, England
- Died: November 15, 2011 (aged 89); Kingston, Ontario Canada
- Education: Corpus Christi College, Oxford (BA, MA)
- Occupations: Economist; Journalist; Editor; Public Servant; Industrialist
- Political party: Liberal
- Spouse: Phyllida Anne Cross (m. 1944)
- Children: 3

Thomas Worrall Kent CC (April 3, 1922 – November 15, 2011) was a British-born Canadian economist, journalist, and public servant who played a pivotal role in reshaping the Liberal Party in the 1960’s and served as a senior policy aide to Prime Minister Lester B. Pearson.

Born in Stafford, England, Kent graduated from Corpus Christi College, Oxford, and worked as a journalist for The Manchester Guardian and The Economist. In 1954, he immigrated to Canada to become editor of the Winnipeg Free Press. He later served as a key advisor to Prime Minister Lester B. Pearson, and was the architect of the federal Liberal revival of the 1960s. He was a leading thinker behind the socio-economic strategies of the 1970s, and served as deputy minister of immigration in the Pearson government. Kent served as president of the Cape Breton Development Corporation, and later of the Sydney Steel Corp. In 1980, he was appointed to chair the Royal Commission on Newspapers, which would become known as the Kent Commission.

In 1979, he was made an Officer of the Order of Canada and was promoted to Companion in 2001.

In 1963, Kent stood for election in the British Columbia riding of Burnaby—Coquitlam, but was defeated by Tommy Douglas.

In his later years, Kent was a Fellow with Queen's University's School of Policy Studies.
