= Byline =

Display of article author's name

The byline (or by-line in British English) on a newspaper or magazine article gives the name of the writer of the article. Bylines are commonly placed between the headline and the text of the article, although some magazines (notably Reader's Digest) place bylines at the bottom of the page to leave more room for graphical elements around the headline.

Dictionary.com defines a byline as "a printed line of text accompanying a news story, article, or the like, giving the author's name".

== Examples ==
A typical newspaper byline might read:

Tom Joyce
New Boston Post Reporter

A byline can also include a brief article summary that introduces the author by name:

Penning a concise description of a long piece has never been as easy as often appears, as Staff Writer John Smith now explains:

Magazine bylines and bylines on opinion pieces often include biographical information on their subjects. A typical biographical byline on a piece of creative nonfiction might read:

John Smith is working on a book, My Time in Ibiza, based on this article. He is returning to the region this summer to gather material for a follow-up essay.

== Prevalence ==
Bylines were rare before the late 19th century. Before then, the most similar practice was the occasional "signed" or "signature" article. The word byline itself first appeared in print in 1926, in a scene set in a newspaper office in The Sun Also Rises by Ernest Hemingway.

One of the earliest consistent uses of the idea was for battlefield reporting during the American Civil War. In 1863, Union General Joseph Hooker required battlefield reporters to sign their articles so that he would know which journalist to blame for any errors or security violations.

The practice became more popular at the end of the 19th century, as journalists became more powerful and popular figures. Bylines were used to promote or create celebrities among some yellow journalists during this time. Proponents of signed articles believed that the signature made the journalist more careful and more honest; publishers thought it made papers sell better.

However, the increasing use of bylines was resisted by others, including the publisher–owner of The New York Times, Adolph Ochs, who believed that bylines interfered with the impersonal nature of news and decreased the sense of institutional responsibility for an article's content. Bylines remained rare in that newspaper for several more decades.

The first Associated Press wire services story with a byline appeared in 1925, and the practice became commonplace shortly afterwards.

Since the 1970s, most modern newspapers and magazines have attributed almost all but their shortest articles and their own editorial pieces to individual reporters or to wire services.

An exception is the British weekly The Economist, which publishes nearly all material except blog posts anonymously. The Economist explains this practice as being traditional and reflective of the collaborative nature of their reporting.

== False attribution ==
Articles that originate from press agency journalists are sometimes incorrectly attributed to newspaper staff. Dominic Ponsford of the Press Gazette gives the following examples:

- Ben Ellery's interview with the boyfriend of murdered Jo Yeates appeared in the Daily Mail and Daily Mirror; the former newspaper carried four bylines, none of which credited Ellery.
- Andrew Buckwell's exclusive on a paternity issue involving Boris Johnson appeared in the Daily Mail without a byline crediting him.

Ponsford also highlights cases in which newspapers byline fictional authors for pieces that attack other newspapers: for example, the Daily Express's use of "Brendon Abbott".

== See also ==
- Acknowledgment (creative arts and sciences)
- Attribution (copyright)
- Byline strike
- Credit (creative arts)
- Dateline
- Lower third, byline for TV journalists
- Pen name
- Signature block
- Strapline, unrelated but often confused, this is a slogan or product name in advertising.
