= Scott Anderson (athlete) =

American runner

Personal information
- Born: January 30, 1974 (age 52) Chicago, Illinois, U.S.

Sport
- Country: United States
- Sport: Track
- Events: 1500 meters, Mile
- College team: Princeton

Achievements and titles
- Personal bests: 800 meters: 1:49.84; 1500 meters: 3:38.70; Mile (road): 3:51; Mile (track): 3:59.76; 5000 meters: 14:03.30

Scott Anderson (born January 30, 1974), nicknamed "Slicko", is an American runner who specialized in middle-distance and long-distance disciplines in competitive track and field. Although Anderson never competed in the Olympics, at one point he was one of the brightest track prospects in the United States. He finished in eighth place out of nine competitors in the first heat of the preliminary round for the 1500-meter race at the 1996 US Olympic Trials.

== Running career ==
=== Collegiate ===
A four-time All-American with Princeton University's track team, Anderson is one of the few known athletes to have run the mile race in under 4 minutes as a non-professional Ivy League athlete. He ran his fastest college-competition mile for Princeton in a time of 3:59.80 (min:sec) on July 14, 1998.

=== Post-collegiate ===
On January 9, 1999, Anderson ran the indoor mile at the 1999 New Balance Games at New York. On December 31, 1999, he ran the Millennium Mile road race in a course-record time of 3:51. He ran his fastest track mile on August 8, 2000 at a time of 3:59.76. On January 20, 2001, Anderson helped push current American Record holder in the mile, Alan Webb, to the first ever North American High School sub-4 minute indoor mile, while wearing a Letsrun.com singlet.
