= Harold Buchwald =

Jewish-Canadian lawyer (1928–2008)

- Born: February 22, 1928; Winnipeg, Manitoba
- Died: April 17, 2008 (aged 80)
- Education: University of Manitoba
- Occupation: lawyer
- Awards: Order of Canada

Harold Buchwald, CM QC (February 22, 1928 – April 17, 2008) was a Jewish-Canadian lawyer.

He was involved in various royal commissions on tax reform legislation and has lectured on corporation law and consumer protection.

Born in Winnipeg, Manitoba to a Jewish family, the son of Frank Buchwald and Bessie Portigal, he received a BA in 1948, an LL.B in 1952, an LL.M in 1957, and an honorary LL.D in 1994 all from the University of Manitoba. He was admitted to the Manitoba Bar in 1952.

In 1965 he formed the firm Buchwald Henteleff with Yude Henteleff. His firm later merged with several other firms and is now known as Pitblado LLP.

He was the director emeritus of the Winnipeg Symphony Orchestra.

He was a member of the board of directors of the Jewish Foundation of Manitoba.

In 1993 he was made a Member of the Order of Canada.

He was married to Darlene [Dee] Besbeck, and they had two sons: Jeffrey Joshua and Richard Dan. He also had grandchildren and many great-nieces and nephews.
