= Izzy Asper =

Canadian businessperson (1932–2003)

Israel Asper OC OM QC

Leader of the Manitoba Liberal Party
- In office October 31, 1970 – 1975
- Preceded by: Robert Bend
- Succeeded by: Charles Huband

Member of the Legislative Assembly of Manitoba for Wolseley
- In office June 16, 1972 – March 1, 1975
- Preceded by: Leonard Claydon
- Succeeded by: Robert Wilson

Personal details
- Born: Israel Harold Asper; August 11, 1932 Minnedosa, Manitoba, Canada
- Died: October 7, 2003 (aged 71) Winnipeg, Manitoba, Canada
- Party: Manitoba Liberal Party
- Spouse: Ruth Asper (m. 1956)
- Children: David; Gail; Leonard
- Education: University of Manitoba (LL.M.)
- Occupation: lawyer; media owner
- Profession: lawyer

Israel Harold "Izzy" Asper (August 11, 1932 – October 7, 2003) was a Canadian tax lawyer and media magnate. He was the founder and owner of the now-defunct TV and media company Canwest and father to its former CEO and President Leonard Asper, former director and corporate secretary Gail Asper, and former Executive Vice President David Asper. He was also the leader of the Manitoba Liberal Party from 1970 to 1975 and is credited with the idea and vision to establish the Canadian Museum for Human Rights.

== Personal life and education ==
Israel Asper was born on August 11, 1932, to a Jewish family in Minnedosa, Manitoba, the son of musicians Leon Asper and Cecilia Swet, who had emigrated from Ukraine in the 1920s.

Asper married Ruth Miriam "Babs" Bernstein on May 27, 1956, at Shaarey Zedek Synagogue, Winnipeg.

Asper attended the University of Manitoba Law School in Winnipeg, where he received his law degree in 1957 and was called to the bar shortly thereafter in July, eventually receiving a Master of Laws in 1964.

On October 7, 2003, Asper died in St. Boniface Hospital at the age of 71 after suffering a heart attack. He was buried in the Shaarey Zedek Cemetery in Winnipeg in the presence of 1,500 mourners, including Prime Minister Jean Chrétien and leading politicians.

== Career ==
He founded the firm of Asper, Freedman & Co. in 1959, and was also a partner and co-founder of the firm Buchwald, Asper, Henteleff (now Pitblado LLP) along with Harold Buchwald and Yude Henteleff.

In 1970, he wrote The Benson Iceberg: A Critical Analysis of the White Paper on Tax Reform in Canada.

Also that year, Asper was elected leader of the Manitoba Liberal Party (defeating university professor John Nesbitt). Asper represented a right-libertarian strain within the party. In the Manitoba election of 1973, he promoted a laissez-faire economy, and advocated the elimination of the welfare state. He also advocated the public financing of election campaigns, to ensure that politics would not be dominated entirely by monied interests. Moreover, as leader of the Manitoba Liberals, he supported the provincial Bill of Rights, and would go on to seek inclusion of the Canadian Charter of Rights and Freedoms in the Constitution Act of 1982. His Liberals won only five seats, and Asper was elected in Wolseley by only four votes. He resigned as party leader and MLA in 1975, though he continued to support the Manitoba Liberal Party in later years.

His media empire began with the Winnipeg television station CKND-TV in 1975. Shortly after, in 1977, Asper formed CanWest Global Communications Corporation, which grew to encompass the Global Television Network, among other assets. In 2000, CanWest bought the media holdings of Conrad Black's Hollinger Inc. for $3.2 billion, allowing Asper control of the Southam newspaper group, over 60 Canadian newspapers (including the daily National Post) as well as several important offshore newspapers and journals.

Asper was noted for his fierce loyalty to Manitoba and western Canada, refusing enticements to move east to Toronto.

I am the offspring of immigrants and Prairie immigrants at that. And these people who would otherwise have been cinders in one of Hitler’s ovens have a great sense of gratitude to Canada for offering them shelter… people arriving with no money, people arriving not being able to speak a word of English from all over the place. And so you get taught that you owe and you have an undischarged debt to this country…

— Israel Asper (2001)

He was also a noted philanthropist, making major donations to the areas of culture, arts, and education; to expand on these endeavours, the Asper Foundation was established in 1983 in Winnipeg. In 1997, to focus on his philanthropic career, Asper resigned as CEO of CanWest to become Executive Chairman. In 2001, Asper donated CA$5 million to the St. Boniface Hospital & Research Foundation.

He was a prominent member of Canada's Jewish community and a vocal supporter for the State of Israel. Among other positions, he was a member of the Board of Governors of the Jewish Foundation of Manitoba.

Asper was also a close friend of Jean Chrétien and Paul Martin. Controversially, Asper's newspaper chain fired Ottawa Citizen publisher Russell Mills after he wrote an article that was critical of Chrétien.

=== Views on Israel ===
As a youth, growing up in Winnipeg, Asper joined the socialist-Zionist youth movement Hashomer Hatzair which supported the creation of a binational state in Mandatory Palestine. As a result of the 1948 Arab–Israeli War, Asper's views on Zionism swung to the right and he became a supporter of Jabotinskyism and Irgun leader Menachem Begin and an opponent of Labour Zionism. Asper said of his views "because the Labour Zionists got control of the educational institutions, and of the government, I utterly supported Begin from the time I was 12 or 13. Without him and his guerrilla revolt against the British, there would be no Israel."

=== Canadian Museum for Human Rights ===
Israel Asper first had the idea to build the Canadian Museum for Human Rights (CMHR) on 18 July 2000. Asper spent the next three years making the CMHR a reality, and had a thorough feasibility study conducted by museum experts from around Canada.

In 2003, Asper established a private charitable organization to build the CMHR, called the Friends of the Canadian Museum for Human Rights. On April 17, the 21st anniversary of the Charter of Rights and Freedoms, an event was held at The Forks in Winnipeg where Asper first publicly announced his intent to create the CMHR. The announcement included considerable funding commitments from the governments of Canada, Manitoba, and Winnipeg, as well as land donated by the Forks Renewal Corporation. Prime Minister Jean Chrétien committed the first $30 million towards the capital cost, and private fundraising was soon overseen by the Friends of the CMHR.

Later that year, on October 7, on his way to announce the architectural competition in Vancouver for the CMHR’s design, Asper died suddenly at the age of 71. His family, along with the Asper Foundation's executive director, vowed to continue to develop the museum. Two weeks later, the groundbreaking ceremony was held at The Forks and the architectural competition announced.

In 2014, a stretch of road in front of the CMHR was named "Israel Asper Way".

== Accolades and recognition ==
- 1975 – appointed Queen’s Counsel
- 1995 – inducted as an Officer of the Order of Canada
- 1995 – inducted into the Canadian Broadcast Hall of Fame
- 1997 – inducted as Laureate of Canadian Business Hall of Fame
- 2000 – inducted as a Founding Member of the Order of Manitoba
- 2000 – The Faculty of Management at the University of Manitoba renamed itself the Asper School of Business.
- 2001 – recipient of the Edmund C. Bovey Award presented by the Canadian Business and Arts Council
- 2002 – awarded Queen Elizabeth II Jubilee Medal

=== Honorary titles and degrees ===
- 1986 – Honorary Lieutenant-Colonel in the Canadian Militia
- 1998 – Honorary Doctor of Laws and Letters, University of Manitoba
- 1999 – Honorary Doctor of Philosophy, Hebrew University of Jerusalem
- 2002 – Honorary Doctor of Laws Degree, McMaster University, Montreal

== The Asper Foundation ==
The Asper Foundation
- Formation: 1983
- Founders: Israel and Babs Asper
- Legal status: Foundation
- Headquarters: 2810-201 Portage Ave, Winnipeg, MB R3B 3K6
- Key people: Leonard Asper, Chair; Gail Asper, President
- Revenue: $12.8 m (2019)
- Expenses: $9.9 m (2019)
- Staff: 6 full-time employees (2019)
- Website: asperfoundation.com

The Asper Foundation is a philanthropic organization in Winnipeg. The Foundation provides general support to Winnipeg's Jewish community as well as supporting the broader community, particularly in western Canada, in areas of culture, education, medical research, community development, and human rights.

The Asper Foundation received its heraldic emblem from the Canadian Heraldic Authority in January 2003. As of 2019, the Foundation has $192 million in assets, and is one of Canada’s largest private foundations.

The Foundation was established in 1983 by Israel and Babs Asper, created from the wealth they had generated via CanWest, to build upon theirs and their family’s philanthropic endeavours. In 1997, to focus on this philanthropy, Israel Asper resigned as CEO of CanWest, remaining as Executive Chairman instead.

=== Beneficiaries ===
Some initiatives in Winnipeg supported by the Foundation include the Asper Foundation Human Rights and Holocaust Studies Program, the Asper School of Business at the University of Manitoba, the Asper Jewish Community Campus, the Saint Boniface Hospital Clinical Research Institute, Winnipeg Harvest, the Lyric Theatre in Assiniboine Park, and several programs with the United Way in Winnipeg.

On 22 November 2000, the Foundation donated $10 million each to The Winnipeg Foundation and the Jewish Foundation of Manitoba. In October 2019, the Foundation announced a gift of CA$5-million to the University of Manitoba to establish the "Asper Foundation Entrance Bursary," a $1,000 entrance bursary program available to students in any faculty or school. In early 2021, the Foundation made a $5 million gift to the Canadian Friends of the Hebrew University of Jerusalem (HUJI) to expand the "Asper HUJI Innovate" startup accelerator program at the university.

The Asper Foundation also created and sourced the funding for Canada’s 5th national museum, the Canadian Museum for Human Rights.

The Foundation's projects in Israel include the Centre for Entrepreneurship at HUJI, Community Action Centres and ‘Edible Gardens’ across Israel, a New Media Centre at Interdisciplinary Center Herzliya, and Yad Vashem’s International School for Holocaust Studies.
