= Asper, Missouri =

Extinct hamlet in Missouri, U.S.

Coordinates: 39°36′20″N 93°28′40″W

Asper is an extinct town in Carroll County, in the U.S. state of Missouri.

The community had the name of a local family. A post office called Asper was established in 1880, and remained in operation until 1903. The closure of the post office caused business activity to shift to other nearby places, and Asper's population dwindled.
