= David Asper =

Canadian lawyer and businessman

David Asper KC
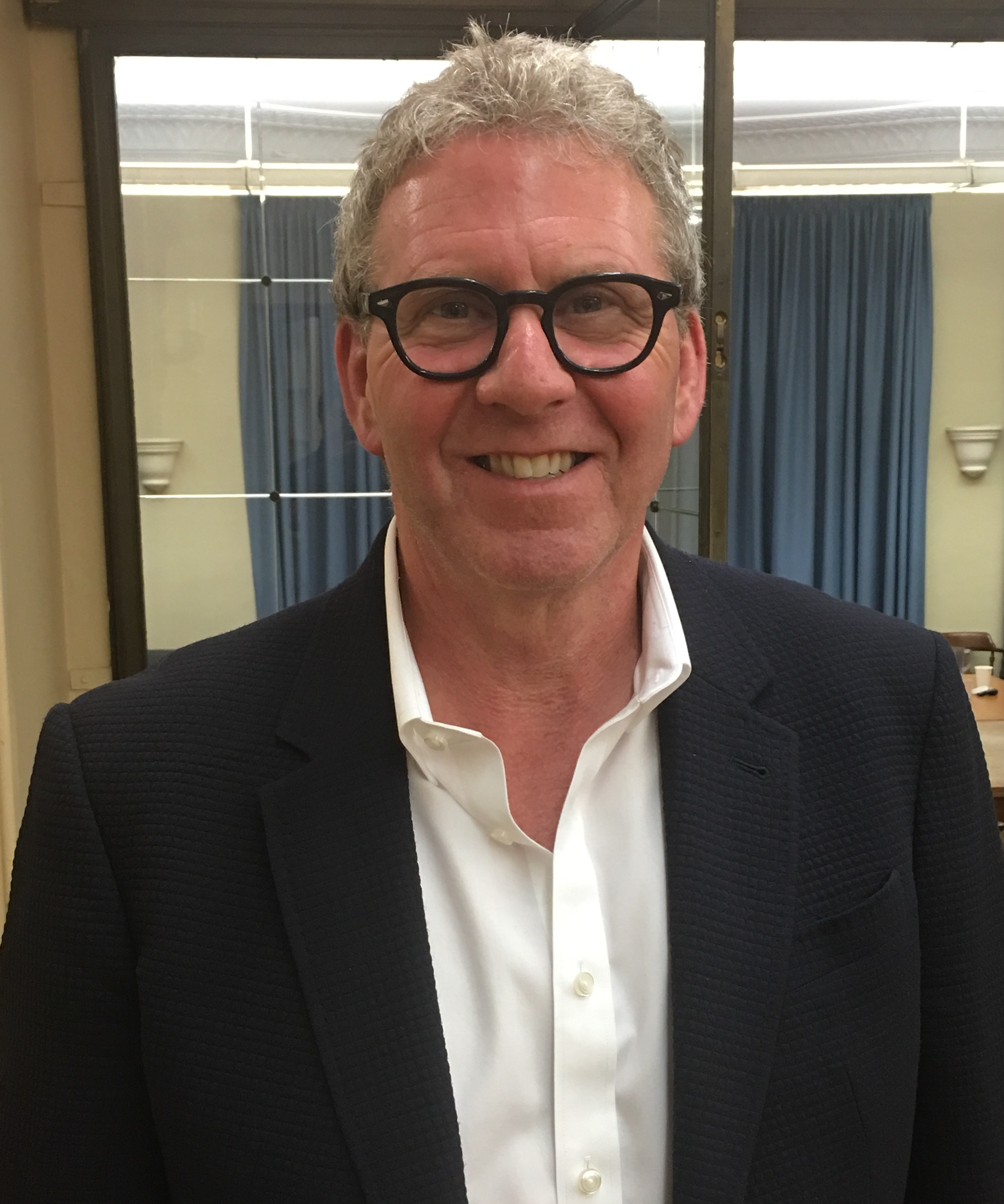
- Asper in 2018
- Born: November 26, 1958 (age 67); Winnipeg, Manitoba, Canada
- Education: University of Manitoba (BA); California Western School of Law (JD)
- Occupation: Lawyer
- Children: 3
- Parent: Izzy Asper

David Asper KC (born November 26, 1958) is a Canadian lawyer and businessman, and a former acting dean of Robson Hall, the law faculty of the University of Manitoba. Asper is the son of Izzy Asper, the founder of Canwest, and is now the head of the charitable foundation named after his family. As a lawyer, he was on the legal team that overturned David Milgaard's wrongful conviction and later became a professor. From April 2017 to December 2018, he was chair of the Winnipeg Police Board and, in January 2019, he became chair of the Manitoba Police Commission.

== Early life and education ==
Asper was born in Winnipeg in 1958 to Izzy and Babs Asper (1933–2011). He has two younger siblings, Gail Asper and Leonard Asper.

After graduating from Brentwood College School on Vancouver Island, he attended the University of Manitoba where he earned a BA in political science and history. He then went to California Western School of Law, earning a Juris Doctor in 1984.

== Career ==
Asper started his career as a lawyer focused primarily on criminal defense litigation and successfully represented David Milgaard in overturning one of Canada's most notorious wrongful conviction cases. He then spent almost 18 years as an executive with Canwest Global Communications, serving on its board of directors and in various operational roles, including as Chair of the National Post. In 2006, he returned to law school at the University of Toronto where he earned an LLM in 2007.

Following completion of his master's degree in law at the University of Toronto in 2007, Asper became an assistant professor of law at the University of Manitoba Robson Hall Faculty of Law. He has taught as an adjunct professor at Lakehead University's Bora Laskin Faculty of Law and at Arizona State University Sandra Day O'Connor College of Law, and comments occasionally on legal matters for popular media. Asper has also served on various committees of the Law Society of Manitoba and is a learning resource for the CPLED Articling module on ethics and professional responsibility.

In 2013, Asper was a co-founder of Amenity Healthcare Limited, which owned and operated a chain of independent pharmacies in Western Canada, typically in traditionally underserved communities. It grew at a rate of seven to ten pharmacies per year before its acquisition in 2017 by TorQuest Partners, a Toronto-based equity firm.

In April 2017, Asper was named by Winnipeg's mayor, Brian Bowman, to be the chair of the Winnipeg Police Board. With his confirmation by the city council the same month, he became the first board head not to be an elected official.

He became acting dean of Robson Hall on July 1, 2020, having been a faculty member from 2009 to 2013.

== Philanthropy ==
In philanthropy and public service, in addition to being chair of The Asper Foundation, Asper is a past chair and director of the Winnipeg Blue Bombers, a member of the Board of the Pan Am Clinic Foundation and co-chair of the 2015 CFL Grey Cup Festival Committee. Through his philanthropy, he provided the lead gift to establish the David Asper Centre for Constitutional Rights at the University of Toronto. He has also established major endowments at the University of Manitoba, United Way and the Jewish Foundation of Manitoba, where he actively supports the Jewish Child and Family Services Helping Hand Initiative.

Past community involvement includes being president of the Winnipeg Folk Festival, chairman of the Winnipeg Blue Bombers, vice-chair of the Canadian Football League board of governors, co-chair of the 2006 Winnipeg Grey Cup Festival, governor and vice-chair at St. John's-Ravenscourt School, member of the University of Toronto governing council and member of the board of the Canadian Friends of the Simon Wiesenthal Centre.

In October 2018, Asper and his family donated 2.5 million dollars to the Canadian Olympic Foundation's 5to8 athlete development campaign, the largest donation to Canadian Olympic sport by a factor of ten.

Asper endorsed Stephen Harper for prime minister and is associated with and supports the Conservative Party of Canada.

== Awards and honours ==
Asper received the Arbour Award from the University of Toronto and the Award of Distinction from Destination Winnipeg. He was a recipient of the Queen Elizabeth II Diamond Jubilee Medal in recognition of his community service. In 2019, he was appointed as Queen's Counsel (now King's Counsel) in the province of Manitoba. Asper was awarded an Honorary Doctorate of Laws (LLD) by the University of Manitoba in 2022.

== Personal life ==
Asper is married to Ruth. Together, they have three adult children: Daniel, Rebecca and Max.
