= Byline strike =

Form of protest whereby the author self-redacts their name

A byline strike is a type of labor strike in which news reporters, photographers or graphic artists refuse to allow their names to appear in bylines with their stories or other contributions. The purpose of removing the byline is to attract public and management attention. The effectiveness of such actions is debated, but a byline strike can provide a means of expressing dissatisfaction without incurring the greater risk of a full strike.

Analysis or opinion pieces may not run at all during byline strikes, because publishing such contributions without author attribution generally does not meet editorial standards for multiple reasons, one being that an article's content can no longer be attributed reliably.

The concept of a "byline strike" arises from the practice of allowing reporters to have a byline removed from a piece which they object to after it has been edited or otherwise altered. Bylines, though widely used today, only came into active use starting from the 1920s.
