= Gail Asper =

Zionist - Canadian heiress and philanthropist (born 1960)

Gail Asper OC OM
- Born: Gail Sheryl Asper; 28 May 1960 (age 66); Winnipeg, Manitoba, Canada
- Education: University of Manitoba
- Occupations: Philanthropist; corporate lawyer
- Title: President of the Asper Foundation (since 2003)
- Political party: Liberal Party of Canada; Manitoba Liberal Party
- Spouse: Michael Paterson (m. 1984)
- Parents: Babs Asper; Izzy Asper
- Relatives: David Asper (brother); Leonard Asper (brother)

Gail Sheryl Asper OC OM (born 1960) is a Canadian heiress, philanthropist, and corporate lawyer. Daughter of the media magnate Izzy Asper, she serves as the president and a trustee of the Asper Foundation.

She is known for bringing to Winnipeg, Manitoba, the $351-million Canadian Museum for Human Rights (CMHR)—the first national museum in Canada to be established outside of the capital region, and whose image now adorns Canada's $10 bill as of 2018. The Asper Foundation itself is the private charitable organization that spearheaded the establishment of the CMHR. On 26 August 2008, the Harper government appointed Asper to the board of trustees of the CMHR.

She was associated with the Liberal Party of Canada and the Manitoba Liberal Party. In 2021 she contributed $3,000 to the campaign of Manitoba conservative Heather Stefanson.

== Early life and family ==
Gail Sheryl Asper was born on 28 May 1960 in Winnipeg, Manitoba, to the entrepreneur and philanthropist Izzy Asper and Babs Asper. In 1974, a year after the Yom Kippur War, Gail visited Jerusalem and its Holocaust memorial, Yad Vashem, which she said had a great impact on her.

Asper attended Kelvin High School, where she graduated in 1978. She then attended the University of Manitoba, where she received a Bachelor of Arts degree in 1981 and a Bachelor of Laws degree in 1984. She married Michael Paterson in 1984, with whom she had two sons.

== Career ==
In 1984, Asper articled with Halifax-based law firm Cox, Downie & Goodfellow. The following year, she was called to the Nova Scotia bar, and subsequently practiced corporate and commercial law as an associate lawyer in Halifax with Goldberg & Thompson until 1989.

In 1989, she joined her father's firm, CanWest Global Communications Corp., as in-house counsel and later as corporate secretary. In 1990, she was called to the Manitoba bar. In 2002, she became President of the Asper Foundation, a private charitable foundation established by her parents.

Following the death of her father in 2003, Asper, her siblings, and the Asper Foundation adopted responsibility for development of the Canadian Museum for Human Rights, which her father had only announced to the public months prior. At this time, then-Prime Minister Jean Chrétien had already committed $100 million towards the project with Israel Asper. To go forward with developing the museum in 2004, Gail Asper formed an advisory council of such people as former Prime Ministers Chrétien and Brian Mulroney, Scotiabank CEO Rick Waugh, actor Ben Kingsley, and journalist Michaëlle Jean (later the Governor General of Canada), among others. On 26 August 2008, Asper was appointed to the board of trustees of the CMHR by the Stephen Harper government.

In 2018, Asper, along with her family and husband Michael Paterson, announced that they would match $1,000,000 of donations to IISD Experimental Lakes Area (IISD-ELA), an internationally unique freshwater laboratory in northwestern Ontario where Paterson worked as a research scientist. Also that year, Manitoba Opera created The Gail Asper Award to honour "exemplary leadership of those outstanding individuals who translate vision into reality and in doing so, make the world a better place."

The 2019 Canadian film Stand! credited Asper as an executive producer, marking her first credit on a motion picture.

In 2021, Asper opposed a city initiative to limit vehicular traffic on Winnipeg's Wellington Crescent in favour of pedestrians and cyclists, citing a personal enjoyment of car rides through the wealthy neighbourhood.

In 2026, she withdrew family funding to the CMHR, including a $50,000 donation to the CMHR on the grounds of protest against a display on The Nakba.

=== Board memberships ===
Asper serves and has served on the boards of numerous corporate and not-for-profit groups.

- From 1991 to 2010, she was a member of the board of directors of Canwest Global Communications Corp.
- From 1998 to 2008, she was a member of the board of Great-West Lifeco, and its subsidiaries.
- She co-chaired the $11-million endowment campaign of the Royal Manitoba Theatre Centre (RMTC), which followed a $6-million capital campaign also co-chaired by Asper. She also served on the board and as President of the RMTC.
- In 2002, she was the campaign chair for that year's Winnipeg United Way Campaign and was a President of the Board of Directors for the United Way of Winnipeg.
- In 2005, Asper joined the board of directors of the National Arts Centre Foundation, being its chair from 2013 to 2017. Today (as of 2021), she serves on its finance committee.
- She served as chair of Winnipeg's Combined Jewish Appeal campaign of Winnipeg for two years.
- For numerous years, she served on the board of directors of the Jewish Federation of Winnipeg.
- From 2003 to 2015, she led the $150-million national capital campaign for the Canadian Museum for Human Rights's private-sector campaign, and currently (as of 2021) sits on the boards of the CMHR and the Friends of the CMHR.
- She currently (as of 2021) serves on the executive of the board of governors of the Hebrew University of Jerusalem.

== Accolades and recognition ==
Asper has received various community service and humanitarian awards:

- 2005 – received Governor-General Ramon John Hnatyshyn Award for Voluntarism in the Performing Arts, which complements the Governor General's Performing Arts Awards
- 2006 – received the Outstanding Volunteer Fundraiser of the Year Award, from the Association of Fundraising Professionals
- 2007 – awarded the Order of Manitoba
- 2008 – made an Officer of the Order of Canada
- 2014 – received the Duff Roblin Award, from the University of Winnipeg
- 2015 – received the Mahatma Gandhi Peace Award (for her role in establishing the CMHR), from the Mahatma Gandhi Centre of Canada
- 2019 – received the Visionary Leadership Award, from the Canadian Network for Arts and Learning
- 2021 – received the Manitoba 150 Women Trailblazer Award, from The Nellie McClung Foundation
- received the YMCA/YWCA Women of Distinction Award for Community Voluntarism
- received the Jane Jacobs Lifetime Achievement Award, from the Canadian Urban Institute
- received the President's Award, from the Canadian Bar Association
- received the Bovey Award, from the Business for the Arts
- Queen's Golden and Diamond Jubilee medals
- received the Humanitarian of the Year Award, from the Canadian Red Cross
- Israel Bonds 66 Award
- made an Honorary Member of the Canadian Actors' Equity Association
- received the Jewish Federation of Manitoba's Max and Mollie Shore Memorial Award
- received the Peter Lougheed Award for Leadership in Public Policy
- received the Nellie Legacy Award, from the Nellie McClung Foundation
- received the Humanitarian Visionary Award, from the David Foster Foundation
- received the Outstanding Philanthropist Award, from the Association of Fundraising Professionals
- received honorary doctorates from the University of Manitoba, the Hebrew University of Jerusalem, the Carleton University, and Mount Saint Vincent University
