= Ottawa Citizen =

Canadian daily newspaper in Ontario

- Fair Play and Daylight

- The February 1, 2016, front page of the Ottawa Citizen
- Type: Daily (no print edition on Sundays or Mondays)
- Format: Broadsheet, digital
- Owner: Postmedia Network
- Editor: Nicole Feriancek
- Founded: 1845; 181 years ago (as the Bytown Packet)
- Language: English
- Headquarters: 1101 Baxter Road; Ottawa, Ontario; K2C 3M4
- Circulation: 231,000 weekdays, 490,000 weekly for print and digital (as of 2022)vividata
- ISSN: 0839-3222
- OCLC number: 60621316
- Website: ottawacitizen.com

The Ottawa Citizen is an English-language daily newspaper owned by Postmedia Network in Ottawa, Ontario, Canada.

== History ==
Established as The Packet of old Bytown in 1845 by William Harris, it was renamed the Citizen in 1851. The newspaper's original motto, which was returned to the editorial page, is "Fair Play and Day-Light".

The paper has been through a number of owners. In 1846, Harris sold the paper to John Gordon Bell and Henry J. Friel. Robert Bell bought the paper in 1849, and sold it to I.B. Taylor in 1861. In 1877, Charles Herbert Mackintosh became the principal owner, and he later sold it to Robert and Lewis Shannon.

In 1897, the Citizen became one of several papers owned by the Southam family. It remained under Southam until the chain was purchased by Conrad Black's Hollinger Inc. in 1996. In 2000, the chain was sold to Canwest Global, which was taken over by Postmedia Network in 2010.

The editorial view of the Citizen has varied with its ownership, taking a reform position under Friel, and a conservative position (supporting John A. Macdonald) under Mackintosh. When the Liberals defeated the Tory government in 1896, the owners of the Citizen decided to sell to Southam, rather than face an expected cut in government revenue. In 2002, the Citizen's publisher, Russell Mills, was dismissed following the publication of a story critical of Prime Minister Jean Chrétien and an editorial calling for Chrétien's resignation.

Former logo

The Citizen published its last Sunday edition on July 15, 2012. This move meant 20 fewer newsroom jobs, and was part of a series of changes made by Postmedia. The Citizen stopped producing a print edition on Mondays as of 17 October 2022, due to the costs of printing and delivery, but it continued to publish a digital Monday edition.

The pre-2014 logo depicted the top of the Peace Tower of Canada's Parliament Buildings in Ottawa. In 2014, the newspaper adopted a new logo showing the paper's name over an outline of the Peace Tower roof on a green background.

== Circulation ==
In Spring 2022, the Ottawa Citizen's unduplicated print and digital average weekday (Monday to Friday) audience was 231,000 and its unduplicated average weekly (Monday to Friday and Saturday and Sunday) audience was 490,000.

== Notable people ==
- Scott Keir Anderson, editor-in-chief from 1996 to 2007
- Scott Burnside, ice hockey columnist
- Peter Calamai (1943–2019), editorial pages editor
- Randall Denley, long-time Ottawa Citizen writer who retired in 2012
- Bob Ferguson (1931–2014), sports journalist and writer
- Terry Glavin, Ottawa Citizen writer until 2020
- Charles Gordon, writer and columnist at the Ottawa Citizen from 1974 to 2005
- John Honderich, Ottawa Citizen reporter from 1973 to 1976
- Kelvin Kirk, artist at the Ottawa Citizen
- Eddie MacCabe (1927–1998), journalist, sports editor and writer
- Russell Mills, editor-in-chief from 1976 to 1984, then publisher
- Gerry Nott, editor-in-chief from 2010 to 2014
- Andrew Potter, editor-in-chief from 2013 to 2016
- Neil Reynolds, editor-in-chief from 1996 to 2000
- Jane Taber, political reporter
- James Travers, editor-in-chief from 1991 to 1996

== See also ==
- Canadian daily newspapers

== Sources ==
- Adam, Mohammed (2005). "When we began 1845: For 160 years, the Citizen has been the 'heartbeat of the community'". Ottawa Citizen.
- Bruce, Charles (1968). News and the Southams. Toronto: Macmillan of Canada. pp. 70–72.
- Kesterton, Wilfred H. (1984). A History of Journalism in Canada. Ottawa: Carleton University Press. ISBN 978-0-88629-022-1.
- Rutherford, Paul (1982). A Victorian authority: The Daily Press in Late Nineteenth-Century Canada. Toronto: University of Toronto Press. ISBN 978-0-8020-5588-0. DDC 71.1. LCC PN4907.
