= Neil Reynolds =

Canadian politician (1940–2013)

6th leader of the Libertarian Party of Canada
- In office 1982–1983
- Preceded by: Linda Cain
- Succeeded by: Victor Levis

Personal details
- Born: Neil Reynolds; Late 1940
- Died: May 19, 2013 (aged 72)

Neil Reynolds (1940 – May 19, 2013) was a Canadian journalist, editor and former leader of the Libertarian Party of Canada.

== Early Life ==
Born in Kingston, Ontario in 1940, Reynolds dropped out of high school and became a journalist.

== Career in journalism ==
After working as a journalist at the Sarnia Observer and the London Free Press, Reynolds became city editor of the Toronto Star. He left the Toronto Star in 1974 to join the Kingston Whig-Standard; he becoming the latter's editor-in-chief in 1978.

Reynolds left Kingston to become editor-in-chief of the New Brunswick Telegraph-Journal and Saint John Times-Globe in 1992. He was hired by Conrad Black as editor-in-chief of the Ottawa Citizen in 1996. Reynolds remained there until 2000, when he became editor-in-chief at the Vancouver Sun until 2003.

Reynolds then moved to back Ottawa, Ontario. In 2007, he and his wife, Donna, bought Diplomat & International Canada, a magazine published in Ottawa. In September 2009, Reynolds became editor-at-Large of three daily newspapers owned by Brunswick News Inc, including the Telegraph-Journal and its two sister publications, the Times & Transcript and The Daily Gleaner. Reynolds ended his career as a columnist for the Report on Business section of The Globe and Mail, submitting what would be his final column in the summer of 2012.

== Politics ==
Although he had been a supporter of the New Democratic Party in earlier years, Reynolds entered politics as the Libertarian Party of Canada's candidate in the 1982 by-election in the riding of Leeds–Grenville. He won 13.4% of the vote, which was the highest percentage vote ever garnered by a Libertarian Party of Canada candidate, either then or since. In May 1982, Reynolds became the party's leader. However, he resigned in 1983 in order to return to his post as Editor of the Kingston Whig-Standard.

== Personal life ==
Reynolds' widow, Donna Jacobs, is an Ottawa-based freelance feature writer and columnist. He died on May 19, 2013, of cancer at the age of 72, leaving his wife, three children, and grandchildren.

Party political offices
Preceded by Linda Cain	Libertarian Party of Canada leader 1982-1983	Succeeded by Victor Levis
