= Leonard Asper =

Canadian businessman (born 1964)

- Born: May 31, 1964 (age 62); Winnipeg, Manitoba, Canada
- Occupations: Brampton Honey Badgers (Owner); Anthem Sports & Entertainment Inc. (CEO); Sygnus Corp. (President); Joshua Foundation (President); Asper Foundation (Vice Chairman); Creswin Properties (Shareholder)
- Parent(s): Izzy Asper; Babs Asper

Leonard Asper (born May 31, 1964) is a Canadian businessperson, entrepreneur and lawyer. He was president and CEO of Canwest from 1999 through its bankruptcy in 2010. He would later establish Anthem Sports & Entertainment (initially Anthem Media Group) which owns television specialty channels and has interests in combat sports and film distribution.

== Family and education ==
Leonard Asper is the son of the late Izzy Asper, founder of CanWest Global Communications Corp. He is the younger brother of Gail Asper and David Asper.

He is a graduate of Brandeis University and the University of Toronto Law School, and is a member of the Ontario Bar Association and The Law Society of Upper Canada.

== Career ==
=== Canwest ===
Asper began his career in 1991 as Associate General Counsel at Canwest's Global Television Network. In 1994, Asper took over the role of corporate development for Canwest.

In 1999, Asper became CEO of Canwest while leading its acquisition of Western International Communications (WIC). Soon afterward, Canwest acquired most of the Hollinger newspapers in Canada in a $3.2 billion transaction. In 2001, Asper was named "CEO of the Year" by Playback, a media industry publication for the Canadian television and film production community.

During Asper's tenure as CEO, Canwest grew to be Canada's largest media company with 38 television channels, including the national Global Television Network and Canada's largest publisher of paid English-language daily newspapers with one of the largest digital portals in the country, Canada.com and its group of 80 associated websites. Internationally, Canwest had properties in New Zealand, Australia, Turkey, Indonesia, Singapore, the U.K. and the U.S. Canwest's revenues nearly quadrupled between 1999 and 2008 to total $3.2 billion, while operating profit grew at annual rate of 8.5% between 1999 and 2008 to $551 million.

Canwest's filed for bankruptcy under the Companies' Creditors Arrangement Act (CCAA) in September 2009, after being impacted by the 2008 financial crisis. As part of that filing, the Asper family and bondholder group announced a plan whereby the Asper family would reinvest in a restructured company. Shaw Communications subsequently bid $2 billion for the broadcasting assets. The Canwest newspaper group was sold to a group led by GoldenTree Asset Management.

Asper stepped down as Canwest CEO on March 3, 2010, to participate in a competing bid in partnership with Goldman Sachs and Catalyst Partners, which was ultimately rejected by the court, paving the way for Shaw to acquire the broadcast assets.

=== Anthem Sports & Entertainment Corp. ===
In September 2010, Asper formed Sygnus Ventures, established to invest in and nurture digital media companies. On December 8, 2010, Asper's Sygnus Corp. acquired a "significant ownership stake" in Anthem Sports & Entertainment, the parent company of Fight Network and several other sports-oriented specialty channels.

== Philanthropy ==
Asper served on the Board of Trustees of Brandeis University for five years, during which time he founded the Asper Center for Global Entrepreneurship atBrandeis International Business School. He currently serves on the board of overseers of Brandeis IBS. Asper also served for five years on the board of the University of Winnipeg Foundation and holds an honorary doctorate in laws from that institution.

Asper is the vice chair of the Asper Foundation and a member of the board of governors of the Saul and Claribel Simkin Center, a seniors' housing complex in Winnipeg.
