= Scott Keir Anderson =

Canadian newspaper editor and journalist

Scott Keir Anderson (born December 31, 1963) is a Canadian newspaper editor and journalist. He served as editor-in-chief of the Ottawa Citizen until 2007. Anderson is currently the senior vice-president of content for Postmedia Network Inc.

In 2006, Anderson was among the group of Canadian newspaper editors that chose not to publish cartoons depicting Muhammad during the Jyllands-Posten Muhammad cartoons controversy. He received criticism for this decision, notably from Ezra Levant, publisher of the Western Standard, who claimed that other editors should not be afraid to use their freedom of expression. Anderson replied that "not publishing [the cartoons] is also an expression of freedom".

Born in Toronto, Ontario, Anderson studied at the University of Toronto, graduating with a Bachelor of Arts degree. He worked from the late 1980s to the present on various newspapers around Canada.
