= Armine Yalnizyan =

Canadian economist and writer

- Citizenship: Canada

Academic background
- Education: Glendon College; Université de Bordeaux; University of Toronto
- Website: atkinsonfoundation.ca/atkinson-fellows/atkinson-fellow-on-the-future-of-workers/

Armine Yalnizyan is a Canadian economist and columnist. In 2012, the CBC described her as one of Canada's "leading progressive economists". She was a senior economist with the progressive Canadian Centre for Policy Alternatives from 2008 to 2017. She appeared regularly on CBC TV's Lang and O'Leary Exchange, CBC Radio's Metro Morning, and contributed regularly to the "Economy Lab" at the Globe and Mail. She is currently a fellow with the Atkinson Foundation focused on the future of workers in a period of technological and demographic change. Her work focuses on "social and economic factors that determine our health and well being", and the care economy. She contributes bi-weekly business columns to the Toronto Star.

== Early years and education ==
Yalnizyan was born in Canada. Her parents were Armenian immigrants. Her grandfathers were killed in the Armenian genocide (1914–1923). She grew up in Toronto.

She completed a bilingual honours degree in economics from Glendon College, a York University federated campus in Toronto, Ontario, including a year of economics at Université de Bordeaux, France. She received a master's degree in Industrial Relations from the University of Toronto in 1985, in labour market policy.

== Career ==
Yalnizyan began her focus on labour market dynamics as a graduate student, when she was asked to be research assistant to Sylvia Ostry in 1983, who had just returned from the Organization for Economic Cooperation and Development, after five years as their chief economist. Ostry was researching the impacts of technological change and globalization on labour markets, and was one of the few mainstream economists at that time that paid attention to gender dynamics. These were and remain prescient themes for economic research.

One of Yalnizyan's first permanent jobs as an economist was in the 1980s with the Social Planning Council of Metropolitan Toronto. At that time the economy was struggling with the impact of the 1981–82 recession, and many full-time jobs were being lost. The Council had already documented the de-industrialization of Toronto, and many residents faced inadequate training and income supports given limited job opportunities. This worsened after 1990, as jobless benefits were cut in four rounds of reforms by consecutive Conservative and Liberal federal governments. Yalnizyan documented trends in full- and part-time job opportunities, working hours, incomes and labour adjustment policies, often adding a gendered analysis. She also tracked changes in fiscal policy (public spending cuts and tax cuts). Yalnizyan was a program director from 1987 to 1997, and returned to be the Council as Director of Research in 2006 and 2007.

In 1998, while working as lead researcher at the Toronto-based Centre for Social Justice, she completed an in-depth 148-page report as part of the Growing Gap Project, entitled "The Growing Gap: Growing Inequality between Rich and Poor in Canada." (Note: The Centre for Social Justice was founded in 1997 to continue the work of the Jesuit Centre for Social Faith and Justice. The Growing Gap Project was funded by the Atkinson Charitable Foundation (Yalnizyan 1998:v.5).) The Growing Gap Project, which was funded by Atkinson Charitable Foundation the SJC's first major project, documented the increasing income and wealth gap, the moderating role of government and potential public policy alternatives.

=== Canadian Centre for Policy Alternatives ===
Yalnizyan began her association with the Canadian Centre for Policy Alternatives in 1993, while still at the Social Planning Council. By 1994, when the centre began to publish their Alternative Federal Budget, she was a research associate.

In 2008 she joined CCPA as Senior Economist to help develop and advance the Inequality Project. She remained with CCPA until 2017. She was a regular contributor to CCPA's Behind the numbers.

After leaving the CCPA, Yalnizyan worked with the Institute for Fiscal Studies and Democracy, the Mowat Centre and Policy Horizons.

== Media ==
=== Toronto Star ===
After years of being requested to write opinion pieces for the Toronto Star, the Star asked Yalnizyan in 2021 to become a regular contributor. She has written bi-weekly columns for the business section since September 2021.

=== Globe and Mail ===
In 2010, Yalnizyan was invited to join a new Globe and Mail feature, the "Economy Lab", which had Canadian economists write about economic issues after the 2008 financial crisis. She contributed regularly to the Economy Lab from 2010 to 2014, and continued to contribute on an occasional basis after 2014.

=== Metro Morning with Matt Galloway ===
In 2012 she became a regular bi-weekly business commentator on the CBC's number one morning show Metro Morning at CBLA-FM in Toronto with Matt Galloway (Note: Topics included "Whether Stephen Poloz will raise interest rates" (June 27, 2018),) which reaches a "million listeners in the Greater Toronto Area."

=== Lang and O'Leary Exchange ===
From the fall of 2011 to the last episode of the show at the end of June 2018, Yalnizyan was a weekly guest on the "Big Picture Panel", the longest running continuous feature of CBC-TV's Lang and O'Leary Exchange with Amanda Lang and Kevin O'Leary.

== Board memberships ==
Yalnizyan was Chair of the Employment and Economics Committee of the National Action Committee on the Status of Women in 1989 and 1990, and served on that board until 1995. She served on the board of the Ottawa-based Public Interest Advocacy Centre (PIAC) from 2001 to 2016. She was an Advisory Board member for the Canadian Institutes for Health Research's Institute of Population and Public Health (CIHR/IPPH) from 2009 to 2016. Yalnizyan is a Senior Fellow of Massey College, University of Toronto. She was President of Canadian Association for Business Economics from 2017-2019, Vice President from 2013-2017, and has served on the board since 2005.

== Awards ==
Yalnizyan was honoured with the first Atkinson Economic Justice Award in 2002 and the University of Toronto's Morley Gunderson Prize in 2003. She received the Ontario Public Health Association Award of Excellence in 2011, and the Ontario Municipal Social Services Association's Champion of Human Service Award in 2012. She became a recipient of the Queen Elizabeth II Diamond Jubilee Medal in 2012.

In 2022, Maclean's listed Yalnizyan in its "Power List: 50 Canadians who are forging paths, leading the debate and shaping how we think and live". She was described as "the caring person's economist: a big-picture thinker who looks out for the little guy."

In 2023, Yalnizyan was awarded the Ellen Meiskins Wood Prize. In 2023 Yalnizyan was also awarded the Galbraith Prize in Economics.

== Themes ==
By 2010, Yalnizyan had "tracked trends in labour markets, income distribution, government budgets and access to services (particularly training and health care) for over 20 years." Her focus has been on "social and economic factors that determine our health and well being", including affordable housing in Canada poverty in Canada, minimum wage, and basic services. In her 2017 Canadian Centre for Policy Alternatives article on redistribution, Yalnizyan wrote that basic income models were market-based and focused on increasing money to access market freedom and choice. Yalnizyan stressed the health-based basic service approach through which more public services are provided that "are not contingent on income." This would provide "more freedom from the market". She cites as examples, "care provided by publicly insured doctors and hospitals and taxpayer-funded public schools dramatically reduce poverty and inequality." Yalnizyan's most recent work places focus on the care economy and its essential role as social infrastructure for the rest of the economy.

== Publications ==
In addition to being a regular contributor for the Globe and Mail's Economy Lab for four years, and more recently writing a regular business column for the Toronto Star, Yalnizyan has published widely in Canadian publications ranging from Macleans, the National Post, the Hill Times, Canadian Business and Zoomer. Yalnizyan also contributed to Straight Goods, a Canadian news magazine, that was online from 2000 to 2013, along with Mel Watkins, Stephen Lewis, Linda McQuaig, Gordon Guyatt, Cathy Crowe, and Charles Gordon; and the Progressive Economics Forum (along with economists like Jim Stanford).

== Controversies ==
In March 1999, Alberta Premier Ralph Klein sent a letter of complaint to Rod Fraser, the University of Alberta's President after Yalnizyan, who was then at Toronto's Centre for Social Justice, presented a paper at the Parkland Institute's "Poverty Amidst Plenty" conference in which she used Statistics Canada data and the research of two University of Lethbridge academics to argue the gap between rich and poor in Alberta was growing faster than in any other Canadian province "despite a rapidly growing economy". In an immediate response, Klein accused the Parkland Institute of being "factually challenged", "one-sided and ideologically biased." Fraser defended the Parkland Institute and free speech, saying that the "university would not be intimidated by Klein's criticism, and would continue to foster a climate of open debate."
