= Honderich =

Honderich (/ˈhɒndrɪk/ HON-drik) is a surname. Notable people with the surname include:

- Ted Honderich, British philosopher
- Beland Honderich, Canadian newspaper executive who worked on the Toronto Star
- John Honderich, publisher of the Toronto Star from 1994 to 2004
- Rachel Honderich, Canadian badminton player
