= Straight Goods =

Straight Goods logo

Straight Goods was a Canadian online news magazine, usually publishing about twenty new stories every week. Publisher Ish Theilheimer founded it in 1999, with the support of about thirty shareholders.

Its first edition went online in January 2000. Publication ended in 2013, with some elements being absorbed into rabble.ca.

== Overview ==
Straight Goods' slogan is "Saving you money - Protecting your rights - Untangling spin". In keeping with this slogan, civil and human rights, consumer information and media criticism appear in every weekly issue. As well, SG has at least one weekly column about the labour movement and a strong emphasis on environmental issues. Readers regularly find original articles by thinkers such as Mel Watkins, Stephen Lewis, Linda McQuaig, Armine Yalnizyan, Aaron Freeman, Gordon Guyatt, Cathy Crowe, Stewart Steinhauer and Charles Gordon, as well as "Hot Headlines", which are summaries and links to interesting articles in other publications.

Straight Goods is supported by sponsors, and individual subscribers and donors. A regular free bulletin is sent out by email and paid subscribers have access to an archive of nearly 7500 articles.

== Affiliated sites ==
In 2007, Straight Goods added a family of new websites. HarperIndex.ca is devoted to analysis and criticism of the government of Stephen Harper, PublicValues.ca and its French sister site Valeurspubliques.ca are devoted to news around the maintenance of public services, and YourDailyClick.ca provides links to activist campaigns and online shopping sites endorsed by the magazine's editorial team.

The Straight Goods Blog was added in 2008.

== Personnel ==
The magazine's editorial team is headed by editor Penney Kome and webmaster Michael Cowley-Owen, who has been the webmaster since the magazine's founding.
