= Rabble.ca =

Canadian website

rabble.ca
- Website type: News and opinion
- Available in: English
- Headquarters: 192 Spadina Avenue, Suite 300, Toronto, ON, M5T 2C2
- Website: rabble.ca
- Launched: April 18, 2001

rabble.ca is an independent, non profit, English-language Canadian online magazine founded in 2001. It features podcasts, videos and a discussion board called babble.

== History ==
Judy Rebick and Mark Surman founded rabble.ca on April 18, 2001. The launch coincided with the Summit of the Americas in Quebec, and rabble covered the Summit during its first week of operation.

Anti-globalization activist Jaggi Singh was an early contributor. Due to his participation in protests at the Summit of the Americas he was jailed for offences including possession of a weapon. Rabble, along with other left-wing organisations and activists, wrote an open letter calling for his release.

Upon its launch, the website raised $200,000, which included $120,000 from the Atkinson Foundation.

In 2005 rabble launched a first podcast network, developed by journalist Wayne MacPhail. In the same year, Judy Rebick resigned as publisher and was replaced by past Managing Editor, Kim Elliott. On September 7, 2008, rabble.ca launched a multi-author election blog. The blog featuring authors such as Maude Barlow and the Council of Canadians and organizations such as the Rideau Institute.

== Contributors ==
Judy Rebick, Naomi Klein, Francine Pelletier, Anna Dashtgard, Patty Barrera, Priscilla Settee, Penney Kome, Doris Anderson, Ann Shin and Sandra DeLaronde were among the original contributors at the launch of the website.

Judy Rebick retired in 2006 and was replaced by Amnesty International member Kim Elliott.

Former Financial Post columnist Murray Dobbin is the guest senior contributing editor for rabble.ca.

The advisory committee of rabble.ca is composed of Dave Mitchell, Fred Wilson, John Urquhart, Linda McQuaig, Lynn Coady, and Sharon Fraser.

== Reception ==
rabble.ca has received both praise and criticism from a range of media analysts. Shauna Rempel of the Toronto Star praised Rabble for its use of the Internet to propel activism, while journalist Colby Cosh dismissed it as "a hobby for Judy Rebick [...] on the Canadian left" and a "vanity web project".
