= Howard Levitt =

Canadian employment lawyer

- Born: Hamilton, Ontario, Canada
- Education: University of Toronto
- Occupations: Lawyer, author, columnist
- Website: www.levittllp.com

Howard Levitt is a Canadian lawyer, author, and columnist. He is a senior partner at the Toronto employment law firm Levitt LLP. Levitt has published six employment law books, including The Law of Dismissal in Canada. He writes a twice weekly column for the Financial Post.

== Early life ==
Levitt was raised in Hamilton, Ontario. He attended the University of Toronto, where he obtained his Bachelor of Laws degree. He did courses at Harvard Law School, following that, obtaining his Negotiation and Advanced Negotiation Certificate under Roger Fisher.

== Career ==
=== Legal career ===
Levitt started his career as an employment lawyer specializing in wrongful dismissal.

Levitt worked on several prolific cases in his early career. He represented Betty Stone, who worked for the Toronto branch of the National Council of Jewish Women. Stone lost her employment as executive director after investigating the political contributions of fundraiser Patti Starr. Known as the Patti Starr affair, the legal proceedings received prominent news coverage and he acted for her before the Houlden Commission. This case contributed to the collapse of the David Peterson provincial Liberal government since many cabinet ministers were involved with Starr.

Levitt also represented Yolanda Ballard, the long-time companion of the Toronto Maple Leafs owner Harold Ballard. After Ballard died in 1990, Yolanda had a legal dispute with his children over the estate, documented extensively in the news.

In the early 1990s, Levitt represented Marek Machtinger, a car dealership employee who disputed the severance pay and termination clause against his former employer. He argued the dismissal did not meet Ontario's Employment Standards Act (ESA). The Machtinger v. HOJ Industries Ltd. case reached the Supreme Court of Canada in 1992, in which Levitt won the appeal. The Supreme Court of Canada ruled in favour of Machtinger, stating that employers must comply with the requirements of the ESA. More recently Levitt has represented Jordan Peterson in his appeal appeal against the College of Psychologists of Ontario. Levitt has acted as lead counsel in more employment law cases before the Supreme Court of Canada and at more provincial Courts of Appeal than any other lawyer in Canadian history.

Levitt developed his career at Lang Michener, which has since rebranded itself as McMillan LLP. In 2011, Levitt started his employment law firm, Levitt LLP. His clients have included the Business Development Bank of Canada, Corus Entertainment, CPA Canada, Rogers Communications, Shaw Communications, and The Co-operators.

Levitt's firm worked on the Matthews v. Ocean Nutrition Canada Ltd. case, which reached the Supreme Court for its verdict. His team represented Matthews, a former Ocean Nutrition Canada employee who sought damages over his exclusion from the company's long-term incentive plan (LTIP). In 2020, the Supreme Court of Canada unanimously ruled that Matthews was entitled to over $1 million in damages for the loss of the LTIP payments. In February 2023, he co-counselled with local counsel and won the largest compensation ever awarded for an employment law case in New Brunswick. In May 2023, Levitt was elected as a bencher for the Law Society of Ontario (LSO).

=== Political career ===
Levitt was Ontario Counsel for the Jean Chretien for Leadership campaign in 1990. At the time of the Meech Lake Accord, Levitt was co-chair, along with the Honourable John Roberts, of ALARM, an organization of Liberals across Canada opposing the Accord which included Premiers and provincial Opposition Leaders. Pierre Trudeau provided this group with support at the time.

=== Author ===
Levitt authored The Law of Dismissal in Canada, a bestselling book analyzing wrongful dismissal cases. A Dalhousie Journal of Legal Studies reviewer praised it as "an indispensable addition to any course on employment law."

After his first publication, Levitt also wrote five other books in his career. His titles include The Law of Dismissal for Human Resources Professionals and War Stories from the Workplace: Columns by Howard Levitt. He is the Editor-in-chief of the Dismissal and Employment Law Digest covering all employment law cases across Canada.

=== Columnist ===
Levitt has a twice weekly column in the Financial Post section of the National Post. He writes about legal topics in the workplace. Levitt appears in radio programs, such as 680 News. Over the years, he has been interviewed regularly by numerous media sources as an authority on labour law, including CBC News, CTV News, Global News, Reuters, The Wall Street Journal, and The New York Times.

=== Philanthropy ===
Levitt's philanthropy includes giving $1,000,000 to the Sinai Health Foundation, a charitable organization serving Mount Sinai Hospital. In 2022, Levitt supported the University of Toronto Faculty of Law with a multimillion dollar donation. The funds support the law school's Indigenous initiatives and postgraduate research. An Indigenous sculpture, donated by Levitt, will be placed in the Howard Levitt Family Square at Falconer Hall.

== Awards ==
Levitt received the Governor General's Award for Community Service and Citizenship in 2012.
