= Katherine Govier =

Canadian novelist and essayist

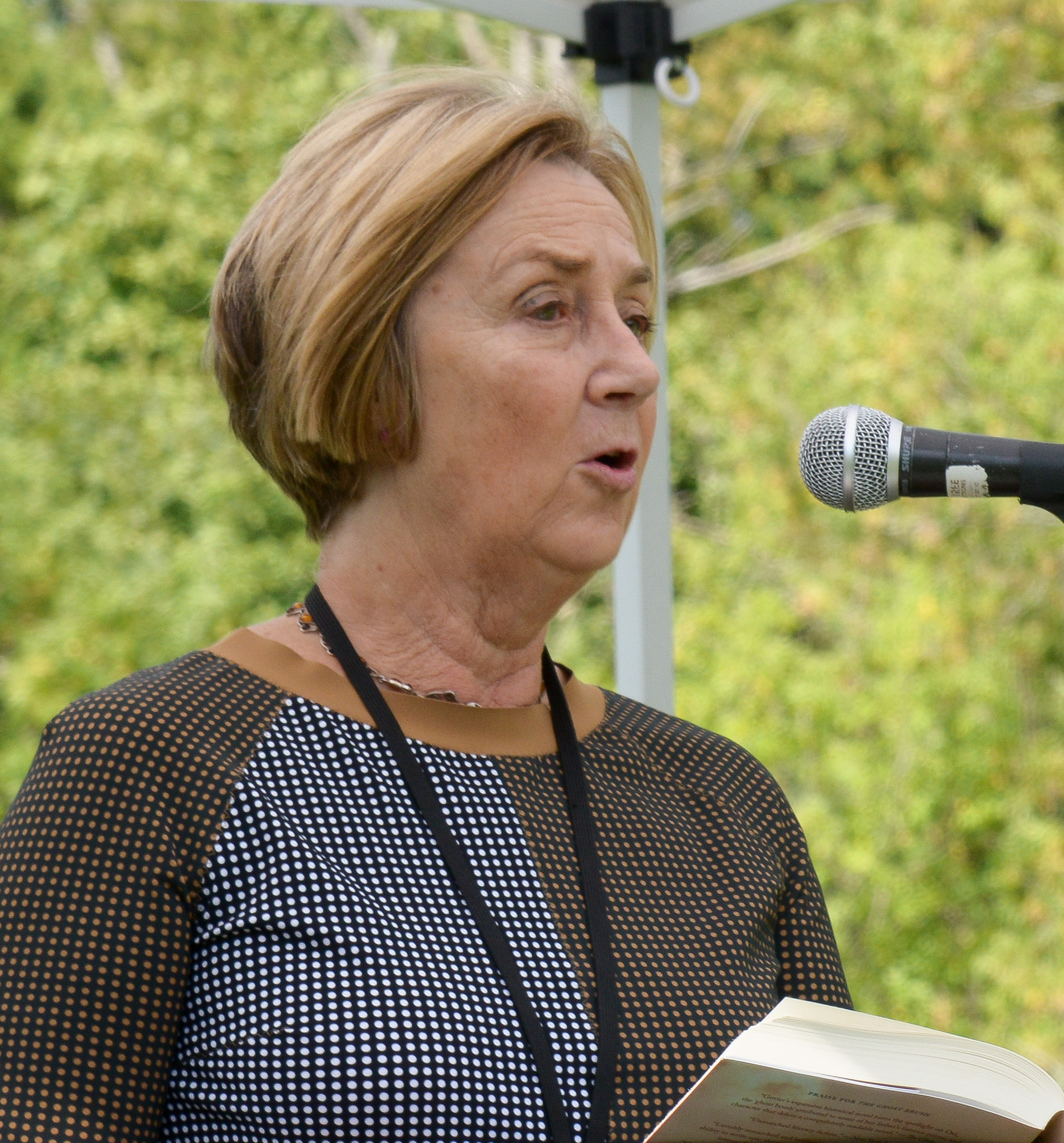
- Govier at the Eden Mills Writers' Festival in 2016
- Citizenship: Canada
- Spouse: John Honderich (div. 1997)
- Partner: Nicholas Rundall
- Children: 2

Katherine Mary Govier (born July 4, 1948) is a Canadian novelist and essayist.

== Biography ==
Katherine Govier was born in Edmonton, Alberta, and was educated at the University of Alberta and York University. She has been made a Distinguished Alumna of the University of Alberta and is one of York University's "Famous Fifty" graduates. She has been Chair of the Writers' Trust of Canada and President of PEN Canada. Govier has published essays in major newspapers and magazines, including Maclean's, Saturday Night, The Globe and Mail, Harper's, Queen, and The Toronto Star.

Govier was shortlisted for the Trillium Award in 1994, and won the City of Toronto Book Award in 1992. In 1997, she was awarded the Marian Engel Award for a woman writer in mid-career. Her novel Creation was a New York Times Notable Book of 2003. Her 2010 novel, The Ghost Brush, focusing on the life of Katsushika Oi, has been published in translation in French as La Femme Hokusai, in Japanese as Hokusai Tu Oi, in Spanish as La Hija del Dibujante, in Romanian as Fiica Lui Hokusai, and in the United States under the title The Printmaker's Daughter. In 2014, Lori Saint-Martin and Paul Gagne were nominated for the Governor General's award for translation 2014 for their translation of The Ghost Brush into French as La Femme Hokusai, published by Quebec-Amerique.

In 2011, she wrote an article for the Ottawa Citizen about a New York Times article on the disparity of female to male writers who contribute to the writing and editing of Wikipedia. Govier also founded The Shoe Project, a writing workshop for immigrant women, with sponsorship from Heather Gardiner and hosting by The Bata Shoe Museum. The group publishes stories on the web, creates 'snapshot' exhibits for The Bata Shoe Museum, and offers public performances. It has been the subject of two one-hour documentaries on CBC Ideas, In Their Shoes I (February 27, 2012), and In Their Shoes II (June 10, 2013), and a Toronto Star article.

In April 2014, Govier's anthology Half for You and Half For Me: Nursery Rhymes and the Stories Behind Them, with illustrations by Sarah Clement, was published by Whitecap Publishers.

== Personal life ==
Govier lives in Toronto, Ontario with her partner Nicholas Rundall. She has two children, Robin and Emily Honderich. She was previously married to John Honderich, former publisher of the Toronto Star.

== Bibliography ==
=== Novels ===
- Random Descent - 1979
- Going Through the Motions - 1982
- Between Men - 1987 ISBN 0-670-81499-7
- Hearts of Flame - 1991
- Angel Walk - 1996 ISBN 0-316-31906-6
- The Truth Teller - 2000
- Creation - 2002
- Three Views of Crystal Water - 2005
- The Ghost Brush - 2010 ISBN 9781554686438
- The Three Sisters Bar and Hotel - 2016

=== Short story collections ===
- Fables of Brunswick Avenue - 1985
- Before and After - 1989
- The Immaculate Conception Photo Gallery - 1994

=== Anthologies edited ===
- Without a Guide: Contemporary Women's Travel Adventures - 1994
- Solo: Writers on Pilgrimage - 2004
- HALF FOR YOU AND HALF FOR ME Nursery Rhymes and the Stories Behind Them - April 2014, anthology, illustrations by Sarah Clement, published by Whitecap Publishers.
