= Walkom =

Walkom is a surname. Notable people with the surname include:

- Arthur Bache Walkom (1889–1976), Australian palaeobotanist and museum director
- Stephen Walkom (born 1963), Canadian ice hockey referee
- Thomas Walkom (born 1950), Canadian journalist
- Brendan Walkom (born 1998), Canadian ice hockey professional
