= Harry C. Hindmarsh =

Canadian newspaper editor and activist

- Born: January 13, 1887; Bismarck, Missouri
- Died: December 20, 1956 (aged 69); Toronto, Ontario, Canada
- Resting place: Oakville and St. Mary's Cemetery, Oakville, Ontario
- Occupations: Newspaper reporter, editor, president of the Toronto Star
- Known for: Journalism that combined popular appeal with campaigns for social justice

Harry Comfort Hindmarsh (January 13, 1887 – December 20, 1956) was a reporter, editor and newspaper executive who helped turn the Toronto Daily Star and its weekend supplement, The Star Weekly into one of Canada's most financially successful and politically influential newspapers. During his 45-year career at the Star, beginning in 1911, HCH, as he was known, rose from cub reporter to managing editor and after the death of owner/editor Joseph E. Atkinson in 1948, he served for nearly nine years as president of the company.

Hindmarsh shared Atkinson's principles that included the need for the state to help the poor, the sick and the elderly while safeguarding workers' rights and civil liberties. In 1915, he married Atkinson's daughter Ruth. Together, Atkinson and Hindmarsh ran the Star as a paper that spared no expense in pursuing sensational stories, playing them up with huge headlines and dramatic photos in a newsroom where the main operating principle was clear: "Get it first, sew it up, then play it big." At the same time, the paper campaigned for social reforms such as mothers' allowances, unemployment insurance, old-age pensions, votes for women, universal medicare and minimum wages. Under their leadership, the Star supported Canada's Liberal Party. By the time of Atkinson's death, it had become the largest newspaper in Canada with a daily circulation of 360,000 and annual revenues of nearly $14 million.

Over the years, Hindmarsh was both revered and hated by those who worked for him. Known at times for his generosity to Star employees struggling with debts or illness, he could also seem bullying and even vindictive especially if he felt writers were becoming too self-important. Ernest Hemingway, who worked for the Star in the early 1920s, was one of many talented writers who quit or were fired. Hemingway posted a lengthy critique on the notice board about how the paper was run. "Hindmarsh is a son of a bitch and a liar and they are easy to understand," he has been quoted as saying. "A good man is hard to understand. A son of a bitch always goes by the rules."

Hindmarsh was married to Ruth Atkinson Hindmarsh for 41 years and their four children included son Harry who had a long career as an editor at the Star. Hindmarsh died a few hours after suffering a heart attack in his office on December 20, 1956.

== Early life and education ==
The child of Canadian parents, Hindmarsh was born in Bismarck, Missouri, but after his father's death from tuberculosis when he was an infant, his mother returned to her prosperous parents in St. Thomas, Ontario where he grew up. His grandfather, Hiram Comfort, a woollen merchant, was the richest man in town and one of the founders of the St. Thomas Times. His paternal uncle George had worked as a reporter for the Brooklyn Eagle. Hindmarsh himself wrote his first newspaper story at 14. While visiting Scotland with his mother, he reported his observations to his hometown paper the Times. After high school, he headed to the Canadian West where he filed to acquire a homestead near Carbon, Alberta. But after a year of farming, he returned to Ontario to enrol as an arts student at the University of Toronto, majoring in history. He returned to the homestead during his first summer break, but on his journey west during the second summer, he spotted an advertisement for a reporter at the Detroit News and ended up spending a whole year working there.

On his return to the University of Toronto, Hindmarsh joined the student literary journal, the Varsity, writing that every day in the life of a reporter was filled with surprises and that journalism opened doors allowing reporters to talk with anyone. By 1909, he had been appointed editor, converting the Varsity into a tri-weekly newspaper that chronicled student activities accompanied by big headlines and splashy pictures. He was also a prominent rebel on campus where, among other things, he organized a Democratic League that campaigned to have college fraternities banned on the grounds they were undemocratic and discriminatory. He drew notice with winning performances in the university's debating club and joined the university's Masonic Lodge because he believed the Masonic order was open to all men regardless of class, race or religion.

After graduation, he worked at Toronto's Globe as an editor, but entered its reporting ranks when the paper's police reporter refused to witness a public hanging and Hindmarsh took the assignment. A few months later, he left to edit what he thought would be a respectable financial paper for a brokerage firm, but soon discovered it was a "tipster sheet" that promoted questionable stocks. On November 30, 1911, the Star asked for help when a reporter was too drunk to write a story about an event that Hindmarsh had also attended. His story, written from memory, impressed the editor who offered him a job at $22 a week.

== Career at the Star ==
Harry Hindmarsh's 45-year career at the Toronto Star began only a few months before the sinking of the Titanic in April 1912. His contribution to the Star's coverage attracted the attention of the newspaper's owner/editor/publisher Joseph E. Atkinson. Hindmarsh was one of several reporters and photographers despatched to interview survivors in New York and Montreal. A story he filed based on interviews with several survivors contradicted widespread reports that some male passengers had pushed women and children aside to scramble into lifeboats. Hindmarsh reported that male passengers had, in fact, been ordered into lifeboats to man the oars after all the women and children who wanted to escape were already safely aboard. He quoted Canadian survivor Arthur Peuchen, who said that lifeboats with the capacity to hold 60 had only 23 in them: "Every woman who cared to was taken off. There was no necessity of any woman being left behind." After he returned to the Star, Hindmarsh was summoned into Atkinson's office where he was asked if he could back up his story. He produced his interview notes as well as statements from ships officers confirming that male passengers had been ordered into the lifeboats. Within a year, Hindmarsh was assigned to editorial work, first on the main copy desk, then at age 26, as city editor.

After Hindmarsh became managing editor of both the Star and Star Weekly in 1928, the paper scored a world-wide scoop that illustrated his willingness to spend as much money as needed to get the news first. The German aircraft, Bremen, had completed the first successful transatlantic flight from east to west on April 12–13, crash-landing on remote Greenly Island in the Gulf of St. Lawrence. Hindmarsh hired a special train to get the first reporters to Lake St. Agnes, Quebec where bush pilot Duke Schiller would be returning from Greenly Island with photos of the event. Six U.S. reporters tried unsuccessfully to board the train, but the Star crew fought them off. The Star offered Schiller $7,000 and when the pilot flew in with one roll of film, the newspaper hired a plane to fly it south. After the aircraft was forced to land at Quebec City, the Star hired another train to speed it to Montreal where it was developed and printed, then driven by taxi through a blizzard to Toronto giving the Star a 24 hour head start over other papers. At the top of its front page, it ran five photos of the Bremen, its crew and local people who greeted the plane when it first landed, trumpeting its achievement under a heading that read: "Most remarkable news-picture scoop in newspaper history."
