= Morley Gunderson =

- Citizenship: Canadian

Academic background
- Education: University of Wisconsin-Madison; Queen's University

Academic work
- Discipline: Labour Economics; Industrial Relations
- Institutions: University of Toronto
- Awards: Gérard Dion Award
- Website: Information at IDEAS / RePEc

Morley K Gunderson, FRSC is a Canadian labour economist and professor emeritus at the Centre for Industrial Relations and Human Resources at the University of Toronto in Toronto, Ontario. He is the inaugural holder of the CIBC Chair in Youth Employment at University of Toronto. In honour of his tenure as director of the Centre for Industrial Relations and Human Resources from 1985-1997, the Morley Gunderson Prize was established. He is known for his contributions to understanding the effects of minimum wages, youth employment, and gender discrimination in the labour market.

He received a Bachelor of Arts degree in 1967 from Queen's University in Kingston, Ontario, a Masters of Arts degree in 1970 and a Ph.D. in 1971, both from the University of Wisconsin–Madison. He has been a visiting scholar at Stanford University and the International Institute for Labour Research in Geneva, Switzerland.

For his contributions to scholarship, Gunderson has been elected a Fellow of the Royal Society of Canada, was the first Canadian to be elected as a Fellow of the Labor and Employment Relations Association. Every year the Morley Gunderson Lecture in Labour Economics & Industrial Relations is held, jointly sponsored by the Centre for Industrial Relations & Human Resources, the Department of Economics, and Woodsworth College, Toronto all at the University of Toronto. In 2003 he was awarded the Gérard Dion Award for Outstanding Contributions to the Field of Industrial Relations and in 2015 he was given the Carolyn Tuohy Impact on Public Policy Award.
