= Penney Kome =

Canadian author and journalist

Penney Kome is a Canadian author and journalist, and the former editor of Straight Goods, a Canadian independent online newsmagazine. She posts articles to the journal Facts and Opinions, an employee-owned journalist cooperative, and blog posts to the On The Other Hand (OTOH) blog for rabble.ca, a Canadian not-for-profit online outlet.

== Overview ==
Kome was born in Chicago in 1948 and raised in the Hyde Park neighborhood of Chicago. She later attended Shimer College, a small Great Books college then located in Mount Carroll, Illinois. She immigrated to Canada in 1968.

She has published six books: Somebody Has To Do It: Whose Work Is Housework? shows how unpaid work underpins the paid workforce, like Marilyn Waring's If Women Counted but with 32 Canadian interviews (McClelland & Stewart, 1982); The Taking of Twenty-Eight: Women Challenge the Constitution a narrative account of a historic spontaneous national political campaign that introduced a new definition of equality to Canada and the world (Women's Press, 1983); Women of Influence: Canadian Women and Politics, an anecdotal account of Canadian women's quiet progress towards equality between suffrage and the Second Wave (Doubleday Canada, 1985); Peace: a Dream Unfolding (lavishly illustrated coffee table book with art, poetry and prose contrasting humans' innate yearning for peace with the horrors of modern nuclear weapons), co-edited with Patrick Crean; published by Sierra Club Books in the US and Lester & Orpen, Dennys in Canada, 1986); Every Voice Counts: A Canadian Woman's Guide to Initiating Political Action (Canadian Advisory Council on the Status of Women, 1989); and Wounded Workers: The Politics of Musculoskeletal Injuries, a fairly technical discussion of a common disabling workplace injury that threatens anyone who uses a computer (University of Toronto Press, 1998). Wrote the "Woman's Place" column in Homemaker's Magazine (circulation about 1 million nationally) from 1976 to 1988, and the "A Woman's View" column in the Calgary Herald, 1990-94.

She is also the former President of the 270-unit Bain Apartment Co-operative, Inc (1982–83) and former National Chair of the 2000-member TWUC, The Writers Union of Canada (2003-2004). Awards include the Toronto YWCA Women of Distinction Award for Communications (1987) and the Robertine Barry Prize for Feminist Journalism (1984). She holds a Canada 125 medal (1992) from the federal government for "significant contributions" to Canadian culture.

In 1987, Kome married Robert S Pond and moved from Toronto to Calgary, where they still reside. They have three grown children: Kimberley Pond Mcpherson, Sanford Kome-Pond and Graham Kome-Pond.

== Commentary ==
Of Women of Influence, University of Toronto Professor Sylvia Bashevkin wrote:

Penney Kome's contributions to research on Canadian women are numerous and varied, beginning with her books on housework (Somebody Has to do It) and the constitution (The Taking of Twenty-Eight), and continuing through her most recent study of the political process. Women of Influence offers a valuable introduction to women's history from the suffragist period through the present; it is full of useful information as well as lively anecdotes, and is easily accessible to general readers."

Of Wounded Workers, the Canadian Labour Congress director of Occupational Health and Safety, Dave Bennett, wrote:

Penney Kome has produced a wide-ranging and well researched account of the epidemic of musculoskeletal injury among workers in North America, an epidemic little known to the general public...This will be the best guide to musculo-skeletal injury for years to come....
