= John Honderich =

Canadian businessman and journalist (1946–2022)

- Born: John Allen Honderich; July 6, 1946; Toronto, Ontario, Canada
- Died: February 5, 2022 (aged 75); Toronto, Ontario, Canada
- Education: University of Toronto (BA, LLB)
- Occupations: Newspaper publisher; journalist; editor
- Years active: 1973–2022
- Title: Publisher of the Toronto Star (1995–2004)
- Spouse: Katherine Govier (div. 1997)
- Children: 2
- Father: Beland Honderich
- Awards: Order of Canada; Order of Ontario

John Allen Honderich, CM OOnt (July 6, 1946 – February 5, 2022) was a Canadian businessman, journalist, and editor who was publisher of the Toronto Star from 1994 to 2004. He previously served as its editor from 1988, the same year his father, Beland Honderich, retired as publisher of the paper.

== Early life ==
Honderich was born in Toronto in 1946. He was one of three children of Beland Honderich and his first wife, Florence. His father was also an editor and publisher of the Toronto Star from 1955 until 1988, and one of his uncles was the British–Canadian philosopher Ted Honderich. Honderich attended junior college in Switzerland, before studying at the University of Toronto. He obtained a Bachelor of Arts in political science and economics in 1968, before graduating with a Bachelor of Laws three years later. He went on to study at the London School of Economics in 1986.

== Career ==
Honderich first worked as an office boy and night reporter for the Ottawa Citizen in 1973. This was done partly to eschew claims of nepotism. Three years later, he joined the Toronto Star and started off as a reporter. He went on to become the paper's bureau chief in Ottawa and Washington, D.C. He subsequently worked as deputy city editor, business editor (from May 1984), and editorial page editor. He assumed the post of editor-in-chief in 1988, the same year that his father retired as publisher of the Star. Honderich also became president of Torstar Corporation. He served as editor until 1994, when he became publisher of the paper. He continued in that role for a decade until 2004.

During his tenure as publisher, Honderich upheld the paper's progressive values and editorial stance. The Star won four Michener Awards and twenty-one citations of merit for public service under his leadership. The 2002 award was in recognition of the paper's investigation into racial profiling stemming from carding, while the 2013 one came after the Star uncovered misconduct by Rob Ford, the mayor of Toronto at the time.

Honderich acted as chair of The Canadian Press from 2001 to 2004. He later played an integral part in ensuring the news agency's survival in 2010. He was appointed in February 2006 as special advisor on the future of the Greater Toronto Area (GTA) and creative cities by Dalton McGuinty, the premier of Ontario at the time. Honderich became chair of Torstar in 2009, and continued in that capacity until 2020, when the company was sold to NordStar Capital.

His memoir, Above the Fold, was published posthumously in 2022.

== Awards and honours ==
Honderich was appointed a member of the Order of Canada in October 2003 and invested in May of the following year. He was later conferred the Order of Ontario in 2005. He was the 2019 recipient of the Canadian Journalism Foundation's lifetime achievement award.

== Personal life ==
Honderich was married to writer Katherine Govier. Together, they had two children: Robin and Emily. They divorced in 1997, and Honderich did not remarry. Robin was the Star's director of editorial analytics and content monetization at the time of Honderich's death.

Honderich died from a heart attack at his home in Toronto on February 5, 2022, at the age of 75.
