= Patti Starr affair =

Canadian political controversy

- Date: 1989-1990
- Location: Toronto, Ontario
- Also known as: Patti Starr scandal, Pattigate
- Outcome: Scandal contributed to Liberal government defeat in 1990; Supreme Court decision on legitimacy of Houlden Inquiry led to precedent of criminal trials over judicial inquiries
- Inquiries: Houlden Judicial Inquiry (suspended)
- Accused: Patti Starr
- Charges: Election fraud, breach of trust
- Convictions: Starr sentenced to six months in jail, paroled after two months
- Litigation: Starr sued David Peterson, Vince Borg and Liberal Party, case eventually dropped

The Patti Starr affair, sometimes referred to as Pattigate or the Patti Starr scandal, was a political controversy that affected the Ontario Liberal government from 1989 to 1990. Patti Starr was a fundraiser and supporter who made illegal political contributions through her role as head of a charity called the Toronto Section of the National Council of Jewish Women. Through her scheme she made $160,000 in contributions to federal, provincial, and municipal politicians. In particular she contributed to Liberal campaign funds during the 1987 Ontario provincial election, including those of some senior cabinet ministers. When the scheme was revealed it contributed to the downfall of the Liberal government in 1990. At the time it was one of the biggest political scandals in Ontario history.

In 1989, Premier David Peterson appointed Justice Lloyd Houlden to lead a judicial inquiry into the affair. Shortly after the inquiry began, Starr launched a lawsuit to have it shut down. The suit, Starr v. Houlden, reached the Supreme Court of Canada which ruled that the inquiry was unconstitutional since it would impair the rights of the defendants to due process which would be available to them in a criminal trial. This decision set a precedent for future judicial inquiries including the Westray Mine disaster of 1992 and the Algo Centre Mall collapse in Elliot Lake in 2012.

In 1991, Starr was found guilty of election fraud and breach of trust. She was sentenced to six months in jail but paroled after two months. In 1993, she wrote a book about her experience called Tempting Fate: A cautionary tale of power and politics. In the book she argued that her sins were minor and that Peterson used her as a scapegoat to avoid scrutiny of other activities within the Liberal party and government.

== Background ==
In 1985, Starr was a volunteer chair of the Toronto Section of the National Council of Jewish Women (NCJW), a charity in existence since 1897. She used this position to cultivate relationships with federal and provincial politicians. In particular she became close with Jim Peterson, who was David Peterson's brother. She also met with Gordon Ashworth, the premier's top aide, and Principal Secretary Hershell Ezrin. She was often seen visiting the premier's office where one staffer remarked that she would 'park her fur'. She referred to Ezrin and Ashworth as 'my babies'. Starr received direction from them as to where to target her fundraising activities. As a reward for raising money she was given the patronage appointment of the chair of Ontario Place.

In the same year, NCJW (Toronto) received a loan from Canadian Mortgage and Housing Corporation to construct non-profit housing. The development called the Prince Charles Housing project, was to be built by Tridel. The council received a $251,000 tax rebate which Starr put into a special capital fund of the charitable foundation that operated the building project. She used nearly $90,000 of this money for questionable political contributions. Tridel also paid the council $100,000 for consulting fees for help in getting housing contract which Starr also used for political contributions.

In February 1989, Linda McQuaig, working as a journalist for The Globe and Mail, was investigating problems with Liberal housing policy and became aware of connections between Starr, real estate developers and the provincial government. McQuaig had received tips about 'weird' election contributions. These tips may have been made due to a dispute between Starr and John Sewell, both of whom were on the board of the Metro Toronto Housing Authority (MTHA). Sewell disagreed with Tridel's involvement with NCJW's Prince Charles housing development because the contract terms violated MTHA policy. Sewell was then fired by Housing Minister Chaviva Hošek, a close associate of Starr. McQuaig published an article that said that the NCJW had made contributions to political parties in contravention of the Charities Accounting Act. The donations were made under the direction of Starr who claimed that the contribution method was not covered under the act. Shortly after the article was published the Elections Finance Commission and the conflict-of-interest commissioner began investigations.

Starr claimed that she received advice from a senior cabinet minister on how to make such political contributions and that she believed that contributions from the foundation fund would not contravene the Charities Accounting Act. She called it a loophole or a "grey area". Gordon Murray, a director at Revenue Canada, said that she was mistaken and that charities were specifically barred from contributions to partisan political causes.

At the NCJW, former executive director Betty Stone went to president Gloria Strom with documents showing the political contributions. Strom confronted Starr who assured her that no such contributions had been made. When Stone investigated further, Starr fired her. Stone hired employment lawyer Howard Levitt and filed a lawsuit against Starr for wrongful dismissal. Her case received prominent news coverage. Strom later said, "We are appalled at the allegations and their implications. The reputation of the NCJW of Canada is being blackened. The Toronto section has been in existence for 93 years and until Mrs. Starr's involvement has never had a single suggestion of misuse of funds."

In March 1989, the national council stripped the officers of the Toronto executive, including Starr, of their powers. In May Starr stepped down as president of the charity but denied it had anything to do with the investigation. On June 8, she resigned as chair of Ontario Place. On June 12, Attorney-General Ian Scott announced that the OPP and a special prosecutor would look into the allegations. On June 22, Gordon Ashworth announced his resignation as he admitted to receiving a free refrigerator and a new paint job for his house. Ian Scott said, "I don't know whether Ashworth received a refrigerator, but assuming he did, the interesting thing was the number of people that thought I got a fridge, if not better."

On June 23, the public trustee announced that 24 politicians had received contributions during the 1987 election campaign. These included provincial Health Minister Elinor Caplan and Transportation Minister Ed Fulton. In addition Federal Conservative MP Bill Attewell and Toronto Mayor Art Eggleton also received payments. These revelations led to a cabinet shuffle by Peterson in which five ministers who had received contributions lost their positions.

== Legal proceedings ==
On June 23, 1989, Peterson ordered a judicial inquiry be set up to investigate the relationship between Starr, Tridel Corp and the government. On July 6, Ian Scott announced that Justice Lloyd Houlden would lead the inquiry. The purpose of the inquiry was to determine "whether a benefit, advantage or reward of any kind was conferred on any elected or unelected public official or any member of his or her family." Initially Starr said she wanted to participate in the inquiry. She said, "I stand by all the things I participated in ... I think the inquiry will be a positive thing."

On September 18, the inquiry began hearings but lawyers for Starr, Ashworth and Tridel move to have it halted. On September 21, a panel of three Ontario Supreme Court justices declined their suit. They appealed to the Ontario Court of Appeal and on November 6, the court agreed to hear the case in January 1990. The Ontario Court of Appeal dismissed their appeal. They then appealed to the Supreme Court of Canada which gave them leave to appeal. In April 1990, the Supreme Court heard Starr v. Houlden and declared the inquiry unconstitutional. They successfully argued that an inquiry investigating criminal charges would deny subjects their full legal rights. Public inquiries can compel witnesses to testify but criminal trial defendants can refuse to testify.

Soon after the supreme court ruling, the police laid 76 charges plus including over 30 violations of election spending laws against Starr. She was charged with defrauding the Ministry of Citizenship and Culture in collecting C$350,000 more than her organization was entitled to in grants for renovations to its offices. The Liberal Party and several party officials were also charged with fraud and breach of trust.

Starr felt unfairly singled out by the affair and launched a lawsuit against Peterson, his adviser Vince Borg, Attorney-General Ian Scott, the province and the cabinet for C$3 million in damages for negligence, defamation, malicious prosecution and abuse of power. In 1991, she offered to settle for C$150,000, which were her legal costs. She later dropped the lawsuit.

== Trial ==
In June 1991, Starr pleaded guilty to eight counts of election fraud expenses for which she was fined $C3,500. 28 other charges were withdrawn or were dismissed. She also pleaded guilty to two criminal charges (out of 11 originally laid) – breach of trust in using $C33,000 of charitable funds for her own purposes and fraud in obtaining $C360,000 in government grant funds that was more than her organization was entitled to. She was sentenced to two six-month jail terms to be served concurrently. At the time of her sentencing Mr. Justice Ted Wren stated, "This case is a tragedy to Patricia Starr and to the community. She brought not only embarrassment to the National Council of Jewish Women, but put at risk their credibility in appealing to their constituency for their continued personal and financial aid." She was paroled after serving two months of her sentence.

== Repercussions ==
The Patti Starr affair was one of the contributing factors that led to the Liberal government's defeat in the 1990 provincial election. While David Peterson was not implicated, the scandal jeopardized the Liberal Party communications strategy up to the 1990 election campaign. It raised questions about Liberal honesty and put Peterson on the defensive during a televised leadership debate in August 1990. Both the Tories and the New Democrats used the scandal to attack Peterson and the Liberal government. Public dissatisfaction over the revelations was one of the key factors in Liberal government defeat. Polls showed that more than half of respondents felt that Peterson had poorly handled the matter and 61% felt that it revealed widespread corruption in the government.

Of longer lasting significance was the Supreme Court of Canada's decision regarding the constitutionality of the public inquiry. The decision has been cited repeatedly in other similar situations including the Westray Mine disaster of 1992 and the Algo Centre Mall collapse in Elliot Lake in 2012.

Shortly after the McQuaig articles had been published and the investigations started, David Peterson asked members of the DelZotto family to step down from their public appointments even though they had not been personally implicated. At the time, Conrad Black was writing columns for the Toronto Sun and the Financial Post. He wrote a column defending the DelZotto family where he labelled investigative reporters as 'jackals'. In particular he called McQuaig a 'weedy, and not very bright, leftist'. The Financial Post reprinted the column without the epithets which angered Black. Based on this he stopped writing columns for the Financial Post.

Journalistic persistence was required to bring this story fully to light and the journalists relied on availability of public records kept by the Commission on Election Finances. These records would not have been available prior to reforms made in the 1970s.

== Aftermath ==
In 1993, Starr published her memoirs about the affair. She called it Tempting Fate: a Cautionary Tale of Power and Politics. In the book Starr claimed that her 'sins' were relatively minor and that Peterson used her as a scapegoat to avoid scrutiny of other government activities.

In 1997, Starr applied for and received a full pardon from the National Parole Board.
