= Joseph E. Atkinson =

Canadian newspaper editor and activist (1865–1948)

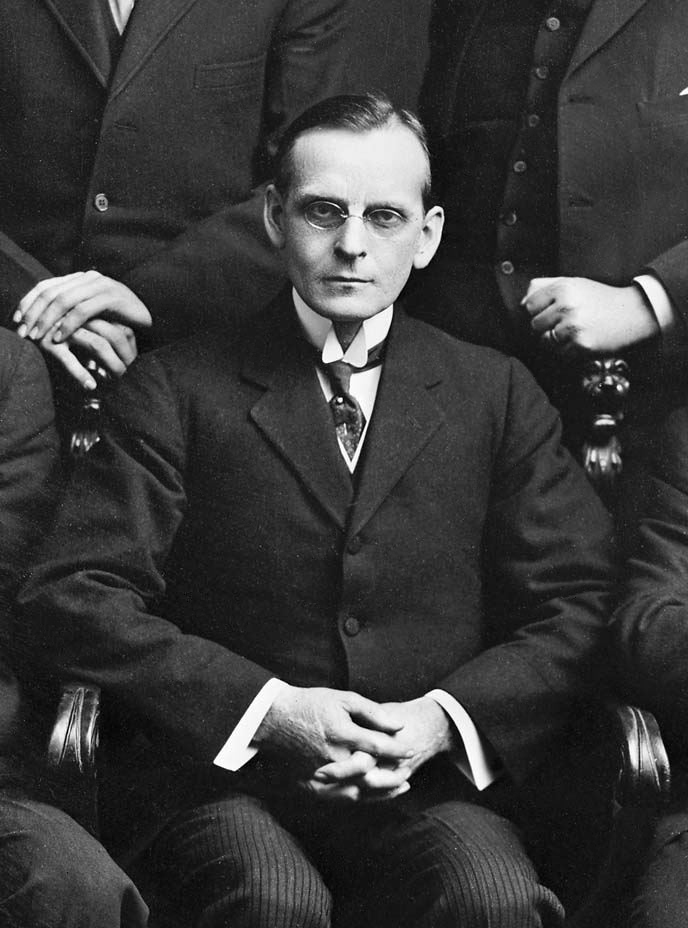
- Born: December 23, 1865; Newcastle, Canada West
- Died: May 8, 1948 (aged 82); Toronto, Ontario, Canada
- Resting place: Oakville and St. Mary's Cemetery, Oakville, Ontario
- Occupation: Newspaper editor
- Known for: Toronto Star publisher

Joseph E. Atkinson (born Joseph Atkinson, December 23, 1865 – May 8, 1948) was a Canadian newspaper editor and activist. Under his leadership the Toronto Star became one of the largest and most influential newspapers in Canada. Atkinson amassed a considerable fortune, eventually holding the controlling interest in the paper he edited. After his death, control of the paper passed to the trustees of the Atkinson Foundation, a major Canadian charity.

A strict Methodist, he earned the nickname "Holy Joe."

== Early life ==
Atkinson was born near Newcastle, Canada West, in 1865. His early life was difficult, creating conditions which would eventually lead to his social activism. His father died when he was six months old, his mother, Hannah, when he was thirteen.

At about the age of 16, while working at the post office, he began to sign his name as "Joseph E. Atkinson" even though he had been given no middle name at birth. Looking for a better job, Atkinson hoped to become a banker, but through his post office work he found out about a job opening at the Port Hope Times, a weekly newspaper in Port Hope, Ontario. He joined the paper at age 18, initially collecting accounts. When the Times started publishing daily, Atkinson became a reporter.

In October 1888, he jumped to The Toronto World and a few months later joined the Globe, one of the newspapers which would become The Globe and Mail. After two years, he became the Globe's Ottawa correspondent, covering the six sessions of Parliament from 1891 to 1896. Atkinson then became managing editor of the Montreal Herald in 1897.

== Family ==
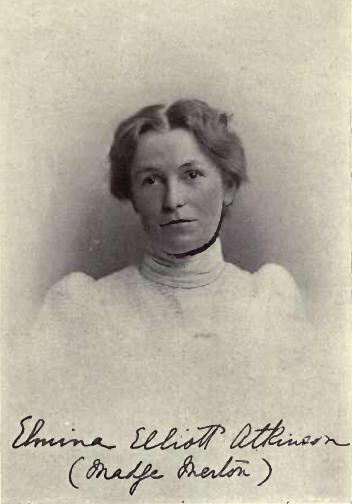
Elmina Elliott Atkinson (Madge Merton) by William Notman

Joseph E. Atkinson married in Toronto on April 18, 1892, to Elmina Ella Susannah Elliott of Oakville, Ontario. Like her husband, Elliott Akinson was a member of the staff of the Toronto Globe. Under the nom-de-plume of "Madge Merton" she worked as a journalist for the Montreal Herald and the Toronto Daily Star. In Henry James Morgan's Types of Canadian Women, he describes "Mrs. Atkinson contrives without loss of interest to give dignity to woman's work in journalism."

== Toronto Star ==
In 1899, Atkinson was asked to become managing editor of the Montreal Star, then the largest English-language newspaper in Canada. The paper's conservative viewpoint clashed with Atkinson's liberal beliefs. While he was considering the offer, in December 1899, Atkinson was asked by a group of supporters of Wilfrid Laurier, the Liberal prime minister of Canada, if he would become publisher of the Toronto Evening Star. The group included Senator George Cox, William Mulock, Peter Charles Larkin and Timothy Eaton. Mulock and most other members of the group wanted the paper to be the voice of the Liberal Party, but Atkinson refused to take the job on those terms and insisted that he be given full control over newspaper policy and that the Star be run in the best interests of the paper, not the Liberal Party. Atkinson travelled to Ottawa and successfully appealed to Laurier for support. Atkinson also insisted that 40 percent of his salary be paid in stock at par value and that he be given the opportunity to become majority owner. After some initial opposition, the ownership group accepted those terms.

The group took ownership of the paper on December 13, 1899. Shareholders formally approved the hiring of Atkinson five days later, with his employment backdated to start December 13. Atkinson's name first appeared in the masthead of the December 21 edition. His task was to save a failing newspaper, competing in a conservative city with six daily newspapers. Atkinson succeeded in turning the fortunes of the paper around and by 1913 it had the largest circulation of any Toronto newspaper. He continued to run the Star until his death in 1948, at the age of 82.

He was well-known for using the power of his newspaper for his social crusades, which led him at times into controversy. Canadian journalist and historian Mark Bourrie has described Atkinson as a "strange mixture of social justice advocate and soul-crushing capitalist" and "a scolding, arch-capitalist Marxist who ran the Toronto Star as a cash machine for social justice movements."

== Legacy ==
After Atkinson died in May 1948, a front-page article in the Star announced that both the newspaper and its weekend magazine, The Star Weekly had been "willed in perpetuity" to The Atkinson Charitable Foundation, incorporated in 1942. The article included quotes from Atkinson's will expressing his desire that ownership of the papers "shall not fall into private hands." It stipulated that the seven trustees of the Foundation and their successors would also operate the Star and Star Weekly:

This should accomplish two things: (1) The publication of the papers will be conducted for the benefit of the public in the full and frank dissemination of news and opinions, with the profit motive, while still important, subsidiary to what I consider to be the chief functions of a metropolitan newspaper; (2) The profits from the newspapers will be used for the promotion and maintenance of social, scientific and economic reforms which are charitable in nature...It is my desire that the Trustees shall have the widest possible freedom possible in the decisions which they make in the operation of the newspapers and the charitable causes which they promote and maintain.

Four years after Atkinson's death, his charitable foundation had distributed $336,867 to 42 recipients including research foundations, universities and hospitals.

Atkinson had two children:

- Joseph S. Atkinson (1904-1968) became the paper's publisher in 1948 and continued until 1966. He was also the board's chair and President of the Joseph E. Atkinson foundation.
- Ruth Atkinson Hindmarsh (1893-1994) married one of the paper's managers, Harry C. Hindmarsh and was also a member of her father's foundation.
