= The Oxford Companion to Philosophy =

1995 book edited by Ted Honderich

- Cover of the first edition, featuring Pablo Picasso's Portrait of Dora Maar
- Editor: Ted Honderich
- Language: English
- Subject: Philosophy
- Publisher: Oxford University Press
- Publication date: 1995
- Publication place: United Kingdom
- Media type: Print (Hardcover and Paperback)
- Pages: 1009 (1995 edition); 1056 (2005 edition)
- ISBN: 0-19-866132-0 (1995 edition); 0-19-926479-1 (2005 edition)

The Oxford Companion to Philosophy (1995; second edition 2005) is a reference work in philosophy edited by the philosopher Ted Honderich and published by Oxford University Press. The second edition included some 300 new entries. The new edition has over 2,200 entries and 291 contributors.

== Publication history ==
- Honderich, Ted (ed.). The Oxford Companion to Philosophy (New York: Oxford University Press, 1995) ISBN 0-19-866132-0
- Honderich, Ted (ed.). The Oxford Companion to Philosophy (Second Edition) (New York: Oxford University Press, 2005) ISBN 978-0-19-926479-7
