= Linda McQuaig =

Canadian journalist, columnist, non-fiction author and social critic

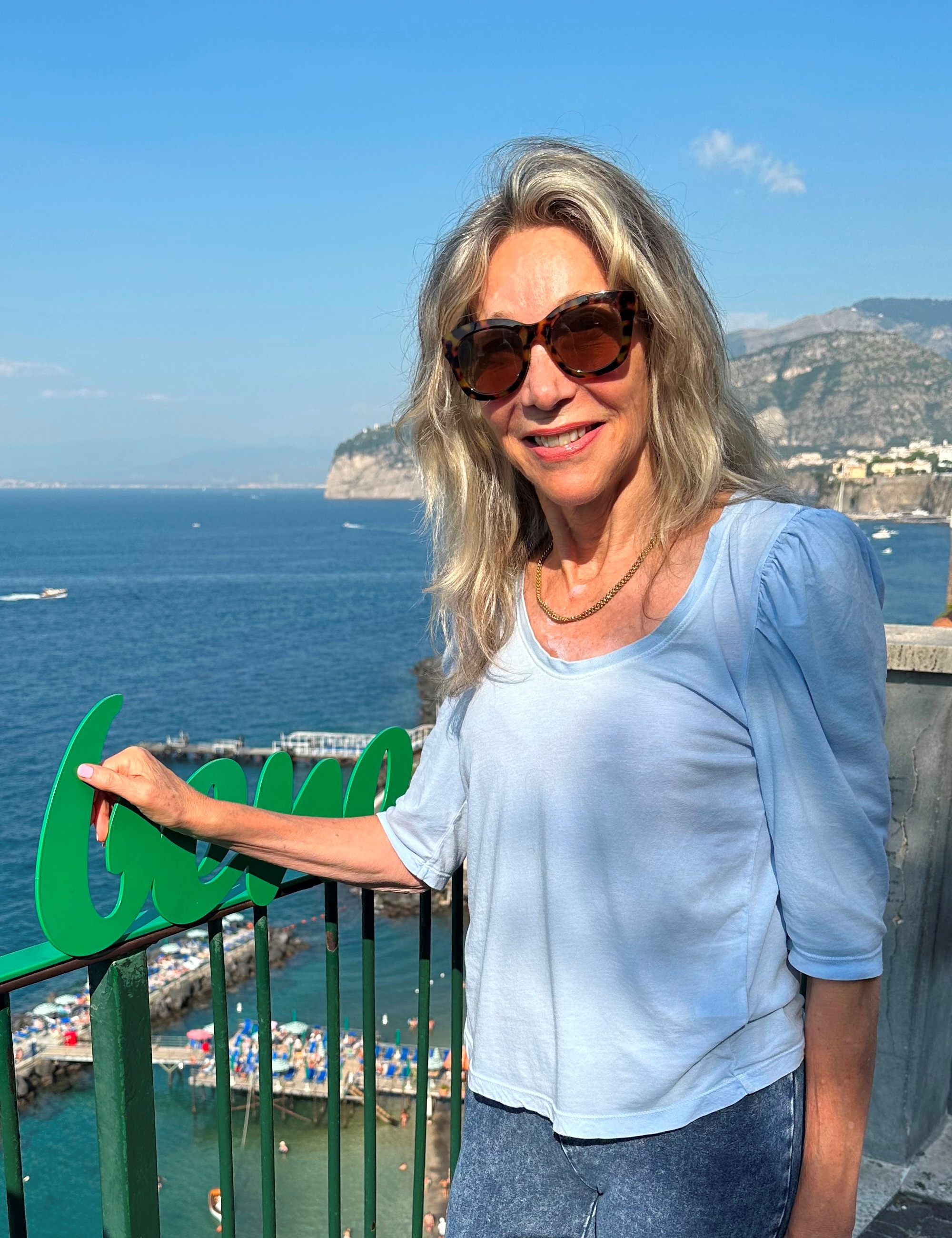
- Linda McQuaig in 2023
- Born: 1951 (age 74–75); Toronto, Ontario, Canada
- Occupations: author, journalist, columnist, author, social critic
- Spouse: 1 (div. 1994)
- Children: 1
- Website: www.lindamcquaig.com

Linda Joy McQuaig (born September 1951) is a Canadian journalist, columnist, author and social critic. She worked as a reporter investigating the Patti Starr affair. She wrote books and newspaper columns focusing on corporate influence in economic and social policy. Jonathan Kay of the National Post newspaper described her as "Canada's Michael Moore".

In 2016, her book Shooting the Hippo: Death by Deficit and other Canadian Myths was named by the Literary Review of Canada as one of the 25 most influential Canadian books of the prior 25 years.

== Early years and personal life ==
McQuaig was born to a middle-class Toronto family. Her father Jack wrote a half-dozen books on leadership and personal development. Her mother Audrey trained as a psychologist, but gave up her career to raise McQuaig, her sister and brothers.

From 1963 to 1970, McQuaig attended Branksome Hall, a Toronto private girls school where she became president of the debating society, and from which she graduated with the Governor General's Academic Medal. Later she attended the University of Toronto.

In the 1970s, McQuaig and four friends co-owned a house they called The Pit in Toronto's east end, where they hosted frequent house parties and dinners for friends. In 1976 she lived for a year in Paris, where she learned French and wrote a never-published novel. In the mid-eighties McQuaig and two female friends created The Make-Out Game, a boardgame she described as "a satire on the different ways men and women approach sex." In the early nineties she married criminal defence lawyer Fred Fedorsen, with whom she has a daughter. The marriage ended in 1994.

== Career ==
From the ages of seven to nine, McQuaig wrote and published the one-page DeVere Weekly, named after the street on which her family lived. McQuaig first worked as a journalist while a student at University of Toronto, initially writing and then co-editing with Thomas Walkom the student newspaper The Varsity. In 1974 she was hired as a reporter by The Globe and Mail newspaper. In 1977 she became a story producer for CBC Radio's As It Happens. In 1979 she went to Tehran to freelance for the CBC, The Globe and Mail and Maclean's magazine, covering the aftermath of the Iranian revolution that overthrew the Shah.

In 1983, McQuaig wrote a two-part piece for Maclean's with its then-assistant business editor Ian Austen investigating whether Canadian financier Conrad Black had tried to influence the Attorney General of Ontario inappropriately to stop an investigation into his attempted takeover of Ohio-based Hanna Mining Company. Years later, Black described McQuaig in his Toronto Sun column as a "weedy and not very bright leftist reporter" who writes "sophomoric, soporiferous left-wing books", and told host Peter Gzowski on CBC Radio that McQuaig deserved to be "horsewhipped".

In 1984, McQuaig returned to the Globe as a political reporter, and in 1989 received the tips that uncovered the Patti Starr affair, in which former Ontario Place CEO Patti Starr was found to have illegally used charitable funds to make political donations, and for which McQuaig was awarded a Centre for Investigative Journalism Award and a National Newspaper Award.

In 1991, she was awarded an Atkinson Fellowship in Public Policy to study the social welfare systems in Europe and North America, pursuant to which in 1992 she authored a 51-page special report called Canada's Social Programs: Under Attack.

In 2004, McQuaig said that Venezuelan autocrat Hugo Chavez had redirected “vast sums of national wealth to the swollen ranks of Venezuela’s poor,” and in 2013 she mourned his death, calling it a “sad milestone.”

Since 1992 McQuaig has written an op-ed column in the Toronto Star and has supported herself through a combination of freelance writing, speaking engagements and royalties from her books.

=== Federal political runs for office ===
In 2013 McQuaig ran for the New Democratic Party in the Toronto Centre by-election. She was defeated by Chrystia Freeland of the Liberal Party.

McQuaig ran again in the 2015 federal election, this time losing to Liberal Bill Morneau. During that campaign, she was denounced by Canadian Prime Minister Stephen Harper after she stated on a CBC-TV program that much of the oil from the Athabasca oil sands would have to be left in the ground if Canada were to meet its climate change targets.

== Themes ==
McQuaig wrote a series of books and newspaper columns.

In her first book, Behind Closed Doors (1987), she opines that members of the financial elite maintained and extended control over the country's tax policy, to their own benefit. In The Quick and the Dead (1991) she opines what she refers to as the negative impact on Canada of the Free Trade Agreement between Canada and the United States.

Her 1993 book The Wealthy Banker's Wife compared the social welfare systems of Europe with those of the United States, and suggested that Canada was veering towards the US model. Her 1995 book, Shooting the Hippo, topped The Globe and Mail national best-seller list for more than two months. It argued that politicians and the business community had misled the Canadian public with claims that rising social spending was driving up the national deficit, thereby requiring the government to slash social spending. The book disputed the seriousness of the deficit and argued that the deficit's prime cause was the Bank of Canada's anti-inflation policy, which it said had dramatically pushed up interest rates and driven the country into recession.

The Cult of Impotence (1998) disputed the notion that countries had no alternative but to submit to corporate demands for deep tax cuts and reduced social spending—or wealth-holders would move their capital offshore. In All You Can Eat (2001), McQuaig looked at how the new international financial rules and trade deals were in her view ensconcing a radical form of capitalism, leading to deep inequality and the disempowerment of the people. Drawing on the work of economic historian and anthropologist Karl Polanyi, McQuaig argued that the new capitalism was not part of a natural evolution but rather a deliberately imposed redesign of society at odds with the basic human need for community. It's The Crude, Dude: War, Big Oil and the Fight for the Planet (2004) argued that the quest for oil had shaped US foreign policy, culminating in George W Bush's 2003 invasion of Iraq, even as global warming was making it imperative for the world to curb oil consumption. It's the Crude, Dude: Greed, Gas, War and the American Way (2006) is a version of her 2004 book with added information. In Holding the Bully's Coat: Canada and the US Empire (2007), McQuaig argued that Canada should stop supporting the US in its role of what she calls an imperial power.

In The Trouble with Billionaires (2010), McQuaig and co-author Neil Brooks, a professor of tax policy at Osgoode Hall Law School in Toronto, examined the rise of the billionaire class and what they called its negative impact on society, and argued for a much more progressive tax system. Billionaires' Ball: Gluttony and Hubris in an Age of Epic Inequality (2012) is a version of the same book with an emphasis on U.S. economic policies.

McQuaig's newspaper columns focus on issues like the importance of maintaining a strong social safety net, and on what she argues are the detrimental effects of privatization, trade and globalization, and the influence of money in politics.

== Books ==
- 1987 – Behind Closed Doors: How the Rich Won Control of Canada's Tax System ... And Ended Up Richer – Toronto: Penguin Books; ISBN 0-670-81678-7
- 1991 – The Quick and the Dead: Brian Mulroney, Big Business and the Seduction of Canada – Toronto: Penguin Books; ISBN 0-670-83305-3
- 1993 – The Wealthy Banker's Wife: The Assault on Equality in Canada – Toronto: Penguin Books – ISBN 0-14-023065-3
- 1995 – Shooting the Hippo: Death by Deficit and Other Canadian Myths – Toronto: Penguin Books; ISBN 978-0-670-84767-9
- 1998 – The Cult of Impotence: Selling the Myth of Powerlessness in the Global Economy – Toronto: Penguin Books; ISBN 0-670-87278-4
- 2001 – All You Can Eat: Greed, Lust and the New Capitalism – Toronto: Penguin Books; ISBN 978-0-14-026222-3
- 2004 – It's the Crude, Dude: War, Big Oil and the Fight for the Planet – Toronto: Doubleday Canada; ISBN 978-0-385-66011-2
- 2006 – It's the Crude, Dude: Greed, Gas, War and the American Way – New York: St. Martin's Press; ISBN 978-0-312-36006-1
- 2007 – Holding the Bully's Coat: Canada and the U.S. Empire – Toronto: Doubleday Canada; ISBN 978-0-385-66012-9
- 2010 – The Trouble with Billionaires (co-authored with Neil Brooks) – Toronto: Viking Canada; ISBN 978-0-670-06419-9
- 2012 – Billionaires' Ball: Gluttony and Hubris in an Age of Epic Inequality (co-authored with Neil Brooks) – Boston: Beacon Press; ISBN 978-0-8070-0339-8
- 2019 – The Sport and Prey of Capitalists: How the Rich Are Stealing Canada's Public Wealth – Toronto: Dundurn Press; ISBN 978-1-45974-366-3
- 2025 – The Road to Goderich – Toronto: Dundurn Press; ISBN 978-1-45975-489-8
- 2026 – Cancelling Billionaires Before They Cancel Us: The Urgent Case for a Wealth Tax (co-authored with Neil Brooks) – Toronto: Dundurn Press; ISBN 978-1-45975-483-6
