= Patti Starr =

Canadian writer and political fundraiser (1942–2024)

- Born: November 18, 1941; Toronto, Ontario, Canada
- Died: April 3, 2024 (aged 82)
- Resting place: Pardes Shalom Cemetery, Vaughan, Ontario
- Other name: Patricia Starr
- Education: Ryerson University
- Occupations: Administrator; fundraiser; writer

Patricia "Patti" Starr (November 18, 1941 — April 3, 2024) was an administrator, novelist, and fundraiser best known for her role in the Patti Starr affair, a political donations scandal that tainted the credibility of David Peterson's Ontario government in the 1980s and contributed to its defeat in the 1990 Ontario general election.

== Background ==
Starr was born in Toronto and was educated at Ryerson University. Starr served for a time as vice-president of the Canadian Jewish Congress and chair of the National Council of Jewish Women (Toronto Section), and was on several boards including the former O’Keefe Centre for the Performing Arts and the agency now known as the Toronto Community Housing Corporation. She was a prominent fundraiser for the Ontario Liberal Party and was appointed chair of Ontario Place by Premier David Peterson in 1987.

== Patti Starr affair ==
In February 1989, The Globe and Mail published an article that said that the National Council of Jewish Women of Canada had made contributions to political parties in contravention of the federal Income Tax Act. The donations were made under the direction of Starr who claimed that the donation method was not covered under the act. She labelled it as a loophole or a "grey area". Gordon Murray, a director at Revenue Canada said that she was mistaken and that charities were specifically barred from contributions to partisan political causes.

In March, the NCJW stripped the officers of the executive, including Starr of their powers. In May, Starr stepped down as president of the charity but denied it had anything to do with the investigation. In June, she resigned as chair of Ontario Place. In the same month, a leaked report listed several prominent politicians as having received donations in 1987. These included provincial Health Minister Elinor Caplan, Transportation Minister Ed Fulton, federal Progressive Conservative MP Bill Attewell and Toronto Mayor Art Eggleton. These revelations led to a cabinet shuffle by Peterson in which five ministers who had received contributions lost their positions.

=== Legal proceedings ===
On June 24, 1989, Peterson ordered a judicial inquiry be set up to investigate the matter. Initially Starr wanted to participate in the inquiry saying, "I stand by all the things I participated in ... I think the inquiry will be a positive thing." Later on she moved to have the inquiry quashed. In January 1990, the Ontario Court of Appeal dismissed her request. Two weeks later the Supreme Court of Canada gave her leave to appeal. In a decision in April, the Supreme Court declared the inquiry unconstitutional. Starr successfully argued that an inquiry investigating criminal charges would deny subjects their full legal rights. Public inquiries can compel witnesses to testify but criminal trial defendants can refuse to testify.

Soon after, the police laid 76 charges plus over 30 violations of election spending laws against Starr. She was charged with defrauding the Ministry of Citizenship and Culture in collecting $350,000 more than her organization was entitled to in grants for renovations to its offices. The Liberal Party and several party officials were also charged with fraud and breach of trust.

Starr felt unfairly singled out by the affair and launched a lawsuit against Peterson, his adviser Vince Borg, Attorney-General Ian Scott, the province and the cabinet for $3 million in damages for negligence, defamation, malicious prosecution and abuse of power. In 1991, she offered to settle for C$150,000, which were her legal costs. She later dropped the lawsuit.

=== Trial ===
In June 1991, Starr pleaded guilty to eight election fraud expense charges for which she was fined $3,500. 28 other charges were withdrawn or were dismissed. She also pleaded guilty to two criminal charges (out of 11 originally laid), breach of trust in using $33,000 of charitable funds for her own purposes and fraud in obtaining $360,000 in government grant funds that was more than her organization was entitled to. She was sentenced to two six-month jail terms to be served concurrently. Justice Ted Wren and Crown Prosecutor Peter Griffiths agreed with Starr’s counsel, Peter West, now superior court Judge West, on the statement of facts that included the following comments by Justice Wren presented in an open courtroom to the media and the public present: “Notwithstanding there was no personal financial benefit to Mrs. Starr and her colleagues were surely aware of her activities on their behalf, an example must be made as a general deterrent to the public because of the high profile of this case”. She was paroled after serving two months of her sentence.

=== Repercussions ===
The "Patti Starr Affair" as it was called in the press was one of the contributing factors that led to the Liberal government's defeat in the 1990 provincial election. Polls showed that more than half of respondents felt that Peterson had poorly handled the matter and 61% felt that it revealed widespread corruption in the government. Of longer lasting significance was the Supreme Court of Canada's decision regarding the constitutionality of the public inquiry. The decision has been cited repeatedly in other similar situations including the Westray Mine disaster of 1992 and the Algo Centre Mall collapse in Elliot Lake in 2012.

== Later life ==
In 1997, Starr applied for and received a full pardon from the National Parole Board of Canada. In 1993, she wrote a book about the scandal entitled, Tempting Fate: A cautionary tale of power and politics. After her sentence, she worked as a researcher and fact checker.

Starr is the also the author of three works of fiction: Deadly Justice (1997), Final Justice (2002) and The Third Hole (2013). She was also an associate editor of the Blue Book of Canadian Business 2017.

She died in 2024 at the age of 82.
