= Ted Honderich =

Canadian-born British philosopher (1933–2024)

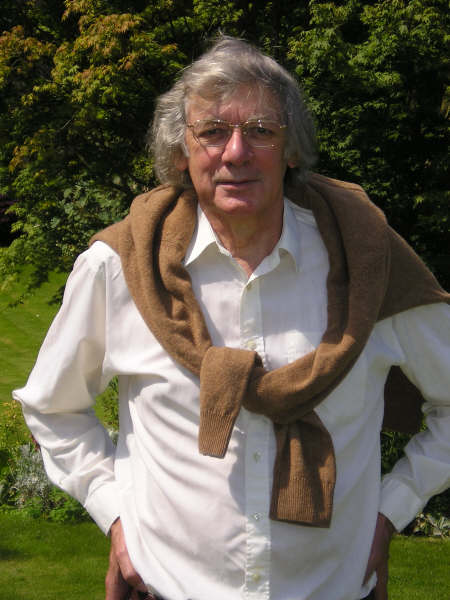
- Honderich in 2008
- Born: 30 January 1933; Baden, Ontario, Canada
- Died: 12 October 2024 (aged 91)

Education
- Education: University of Toronto, University College London

Philosophical work
- Era: Contemporary philosophy
- Region: Western philosophy
- School: Analytic
- Main interests: Consciousness · Determinism · Philosophy of Mind · Ethics · International Relations · Punishment · Conservatism
- Notable ideas: The Principle of Humanity

Edgar Dawn Ross "Ted" Honderich (30 January 1933 – 12 October 2024) was a Canadian-born British philosopher, who was Grote Professor Emeritus of the Philosophy of Mind and Logic, University College London.

== Biography ==
Honderich was born on 30 January 1933 in Baden, Ontario, Canada, the younger brother of Beland Honderich, who became publisher of the Toronto Star. An undergraduate at the University of Toronto, qualifying as B.A. (Hons) in Philosophy and English Literature, he came to University College London to study under the logical positivist and Grote Professor A. J. Ayer, who had actually left for Oxford in 1961, graduating with a PhD in 1968. He subsequently lived in England and became a British citizen. After being a lecturer at the University of Sussex he became lecturer, reader, professor and then Grote Professor at University College London. He was visiting professor at the Graduate Center of the City University of New York, Yale and the universities of Bath and Calgary. He was author of many books and articles on such subjects as consciousness, determinism, qualia, functionalism, timings of sensory experiences, psychophysical intimacy, the correspondence theory of truth, Russell's theory of descriptions, time, causation, Mill's On Liberty, John Searle's view of free will and G. A. Cohen's defence of Marx's theory of history. He also edited several series of philosophy books.

He was involved in controversy for his moral defence of Palestinian political violence, despite his justification of the founding and maintaining of Israel in its original 1948 borders.

His papers in philosophical journals have been published in three volumes by Edinburgh University Press. He appeared on radio and television, was the editor of The Oxford Companion to Philosophy, wrote a philosophical autobiography, was chairman of the Royal Institute of Philosophy where he inaugurated the annual lectures subsequently published as Philosophers of Our Times, and he was an honorary associate of the National Secular Society.

Honderich was married to Ingrid Coggin. He died on 12 October 2024, at the age of 91.

== Consciousness ==
Honderich's theory of consciousness in the long book Actual Consciousness and the precis-book Your Being Conscious is What? Where? replaces entirely his philosophy of mind in A Theory of Determinism: The Mind, Neuroscience and Life-Hopes and the precis-book How Free Are You?. The new theory derives from a database to the effect that being conscious, figuratively speaking, is something's being actual. This issues, by way of (a) speculation that disagreement about consciousness is significantly owed to no adequate initial clarification of the subject matter, and (b) examination of five leading ideas of consciousness and existing theories of consciousness, and (c) a specification of the objective physical world, into the wholly literal theory or analysis of the nature of consciousness called Actualism. It distinguishes three sides of consciousness: (1) perceptual consciousness—consciousness in perception, (2) cognitive consciousness, and (3) affective consciousness. In each case the theory satisfies the two primary criteria of explaining what is actual, and what its being actual consists in.

In the case of perceptual consciousness what is actual is only a subjective physical world out there. I.e. being perceptually conscious is essentially or primarily a state of affairs external to the perceiver. Its being actual is its being subjectively physical, which is specified. In the case of cognitive and affective consciousness, what is actual is representations, internal to the conscious thing, and their being actual is their being subjectively physical, differently so from subjective physical worlds. Actualism argues, further, that it satisfies further criteria better than other existing theories of consciousness including one of subjectivity, individuality or personal identity, and that it is relevant to desires for human standing that are the motivation of beliefs in free will as against determinism. Actualism has been received as a new and arguable theory by philosophers who have previously declared the urgent need for one. A predecessor of the theory is discussed by 11 other philosophers in Radical Externalism: Honderich's Theory of Consciousness Discussed, ed. Anthony Freeman, Imprint Academic.

== Determinism and freedom ==
In A Theory of Determinism: The Mind, Neuroscience and Life-Hopes and in the precis-book How Free Are You?, Honderich expounds a theory of causation as well as other lawlike connections. This he uses to formulate three hypotheses of a deterministic philosophy of mind. They are argued to be true, mainly on the basis of neuroscience. The clarity of determinism is contrasted with the obscurity of the doctrines of free will or origination.

The centuries-dominant philosophical traditions of determinism and freedom, Compatibilism and Incompatibilism, are examined. According to the first, determinism is consistent with our freedom and moral responsibility; according to the second, it is inconsistent with them. Honderich considers Compatibilism's argument that our freedom consists in voluntariness, doing what we desire and not being coerced; hence its conclusion that determinism and freedom can go together. He also examines Incompatibilism's argument that our freedom consists in origination or free will, our choosing without our choosing's being caused; hence the conclusion that determinism and freedom are inconsistent.

Honderich argues that both views are mistaken, since freedom as voluntariness and freedom as origination are each as fundamental to our lives. The real problem of the consequences of determinism is not choosing between the two traditional doctrines, but a more practical one: trying to give up what must be given up, since we do not have the power of origination. Honderich's rejection of both traditions has been taken up by other philosophers, many of whom find his criticisms decisive.

== Mind and brain ==
Honderich's Union Theory of mind and brain is defended in A Theory of Determinism. The Union Theory takes it as possible that conscious events like our choices and decisions are in a way subjective but are nevertheless physical rather than near-physical events. They stand in a kind of lawlike connection with neural events, sometimes called the supervenience of mental events on neural events. These psychoneural pairs, as Honderich calls them, are just effects of certain causal sequences, and are causes of our actions. This sort of physicalism, a predecessor to the notion of supervenience, has since been succeeded in Honderich's writings by the near-physicalism of Radical Externalism. Radical Externalism holds that perceptual consciousness does not have a nomic sufficient condition in a head but only a necessary one. Honderich argues that reflective and affective consciousness are different again. He also argues that this is consistent with contemporary neuroscience, rescues us from the argument from illusion or brain in a vat, and also from the dubious conclusions of sense-data theory and phenomenalism.

== The Principle of Humanity ==
Honderich argues that the Principle of Humanity is that what is right always consists in what, according to the best available knowledge and judgement, are actually rational steps, effective and not self-defeating ones rather than pretences, to the end of getting and keeping people out of bad lives. Bad lives are defined as those deprived of six fundamental human goods: a decent length of life, bodily well-being, freedom and power in various settings, respect and self-respect, the goods of relationship, and the goods of culture. It is a consequentialist principle, but not the principle of utility, nor of course the claim that the ends justify the means. Honderich argues that the principle is fundamental to but not the whole of a morality of humanity. This, he claims, includes certain policies of equality and inequality and certain practices, one being a better democracy than we have. Honderich concludes that the Principle of Humanity is better supported than any other sort of moral principle, on the basis of both consistency and certain facts. He takes it that non-consequentialist reasons are not really reasons at all, nor, he says, does the Principle grant any distinction between acts and omissions.

== International right and wrong, democracy, terrorism ==
Following 9/11, Honderich published After the Terror. The author first lays out premises for what he terms the "bad lives" and "good lives", of those living in Africa and in rich countries respectively. With respect to bad lives, Honderich argues that our omissions have resulted in 20 million years of possible living-time lost by a certain sample of Africans. He also considers the creation of Israel in 1948 and records what he describes as the bad lives of Palestinians as a result of what is called the neo-Zionist expansion of Israel since the 1967 war. Honderich asks whether those in the rich societies do wrong in doing nothing about bad lives. He considers natural morality as well as our worked-out or philosophical moralities. Such outlooks as political realism and such ideologies as liberalism and libertarianism are also considered, as is what Honderich calls 'hierarchic democracy'. The Principle of Humanity is used to judge our moral responsibility for the many bad lives, which Honderich tells us is great. The Principle also condemns the terrorist killings of 11 September as hideous. The killings were not rational means to an end that was partly defensible. The West's subsequent attack on Afghanistan is excused. But the taking from Palestinians of at least their freedom in the last fifth of their homeland, historic Palestine, is condemned. Honderich writes: '...the Palestinians have had a moral right to their terrorism as certain as was the moral right, say, of the African people of South Africa against their white captors and the apartheid state'.

Honderich claims that we need to see the power of our societies as deadly. Americans, first of all, because of their unique power, need to think more carefully about their actions. He also argues that we should supplement our democracies with the transformations of the civil disobedience of Henry David Thoreau, Martin Luther King Jr., Bertrand Russell, and those in Eastern Europe who brought down the wall.

His later book, Humanity, Terrorism, Terrorist War: Palestine, 9/11, Iraq, 7/7... begins by asking if analytic philosophy in considering large questions of right and wrong should proceed by embracing international law, human rights, just war theory or the like. Honderich, finding these means of judgement wanting, again takes up the Principle of Humanity. The book justifies and defends Zionism, defined as the creation of Israel in its original borders, but also reaffirms that Palestinians have had a moral right to their liberation—to terrorism within historic Palestine against what Honderich calls the ethnic cleansing of Neo-Zionism, the expansion of Israel beyond its original borders. After a further consideration of 9/11, there is an analysis of 10 reasons for what he calls 'our terrorist war' in Iraq. Honderich condemns the war as morally barbaric, given the foreseen and thus intentional killing of many innocents. In condemning the 7/7 terrorist attack on London, Honderich considers the importance of horror to morality. He also argues that Tony Blair and George W. Bush are friends rather than enemies of terrorism. The book ends with a postscript on the charge of anti-semitism against critics of neo-Zionism – a charge Honderich says is principally a part of Neo-Zionism or at least something insufficiently detached from it.

In January 2011, Honderich wrote a letter to the Guardian on terrorism, in response to details released about the Israeli-Palestinian peace process:

[T]he Palestinians have a moral right to their terrorism within historic Palestine against neo-Zionism. The latter, neither Zionism nor of course Jewishness, is the taking from the Palestinians of at least their autonomy in the last one-fifth of their historic homeland. Terrorism, as in this case, can as exactly be self-defence, a freedom struggle, martyrdom, the conclusion of an argument based on true humanity.

== Punishment ==
In Punishment: The Supposed Justifications, Honderich surveys and analyses 14 traditional, backward-looking reasons for the justification of punishment by the state. Most have to do with desert or retribution, others with annulment or consent. All are found to be weak or worse. Honderich then argues that the strong tradition of punishment must have in it some real content or argument. This is found to be that punishment is justified by giving satisfaction to grievance-desires—doing no more than satisfying them. This, Honderich concludes, is the reality of retributivism, but it cannot be an effective justification of punishment. The Utilitarian prevention theory of punishment is also rejected, because it justifies certain victimisations. Mixed theories of punishment, drawing on backward-looking considerations as well as the notion of prevention, sometimes in terms of the reform of offenders, are also found to be untenable. Robert Nozick's theory in particular is examined. Honderich's conclusion is that the long-running problem of the justification of punishment is now dead. Its justification must be in terms of its consequences—in discouraging and licensing certain kinds of behaviour. The live issue is determining what these are. Honderich's answer has to do with the Principle of Humanity. Punishment is or would be justified when it rationally takes forward the humanisation of our societies. He argues, on the basis of this, that most punishments are in fact wrong.

== Conservatism ==
Honderich's book Conservatism begins with a general inquiry into the distinctions between British and American conservatism. He argues that one [British conservatism?] has to do with eternal values and therefore with reform rather than change, a view underpinning Edmund Burke's condemnation of the French Revolution and all conservatives since. Other distinctions have to do with the right kind of political thinking and with human nature, with particular doctrines of incentive and reward, and with certain freedoms, including those of private property. Given these distinctions which set conservatism apart from other views, Honderich asks what underlies and brings these distinctions together. What is the rationale or underlying principle of conservatism? The answer he gives is not just that the conservative tradition is selfish. Its self-interest, he argues, does not distinguish it from other political traditions. What does distinguish it, Honderich concludes, is that it lacks a moral principle to defend its self-interest. It is unique in its amorality. Conservatism was enlarged as Conservatism: Burke, Nozick, Bush, Blair? in 2005, and includes Honderich's consideration of whether Britain's New Labour is truly in the conservative political tradition.

== Controversy ==
Honderich has been involved in controversy since the publication of his book After the Terror in 2002. Honderich arranged with Oxfam in Britain and the publisher of After the Terror, Edinburgh University Press, to have the £5,000 advance on royalties go to the charity, along with more money from the publishers. The Canadian newspaper The Globe and Mail suggested that Oxfam was taking money from a terrorist sympathiser, and it then declined the contributions, for which it was judged adversely in the British media. The book was published in a German translation. Micha Brumlik, director of a Holocaust centre and Professor of Pedagogy at Frankfurt University, demanded publicly that the book be withdrawn from sale by the publisher, Suhrkamp Verlag. Despite the declaration by the philosopher Jürgen Habermas, who had recommended the translation, that the book was not anti-semitic, it was withdrawn from sale. Honderich demanded the dismissal of Brumlik from his professorship, for violation of academic principle. There was a media furore in Germany. The book was retranslated and republished by an antizionist Jewish publishing house, Melzer Verlag. Lesser controversies have included an imputation of anti-semitism by a student newspaper in London, against which Honderich took successful legal action. There have been attacks by Palestinians on Honderich's justification of Zionism too, including disruptions at meetings.

== Other writings ==
Honderich wrote a number of papers in criticism of Donald Davidson's Anomalous Monism, and in particular made the objection that on certain assumptions the view is epiphenomenalist. The papers are reprinted in Mental Causation and the Metaphysics of Mind, edited by Neil Campbell. Earlier journal papers are about Austin's correspondence theory of truth, causation, time, Russell's theory of descriptions, and John Stuart Mill's essay On Liberty. Honderich's philosophical autobiography, Philosopher: A Kind of Life, is a personal and general picture of English academic life over several decades. An encyclopaedia edited by him, The Oxford Companion to Philosophy, is in its second edition.

== Selected publications ==
- Actual Consciousness, Oxford University Press, 2014. ISBN 978-0-19-871438-5.
- Your Consciousness is What? Where?, forthcoming.
- Radical Externalism: Honderich's Theory of Consciousness Discussed, Anthony Freeman, Ed., Imprint Academic, 2006. ISBN 1-84540-068-2.
- Humanity, Terrorism, Terrorist War: Palestine, 9/11, Iraq, 7/7London: Continuum, 2006. ISBN 0-8264-9116-2.
- Punishment, the Supposed Justifications Revisited, Pluto Press, 2005. Revised edition.
- On Determinism and Freedom, Edinburgh University Press, 2005. ISBN 0-7486-1841-4.
- Conservatism: Burke, Nozick, Bush, Blair?, Pluto Press, 2005. Enlarged edition. ISBN 0-7453-2129-1.
- On Consciousness, Edinburgh University Press, 2004. Collected papers. ISBN 0-7486-1842-2.
- Terrorism for Humanity: Inquiries in Political Philosophy, Pluto Press, 2004. Revised and retitled edition. ISBN 0-7453-2133-X.
- On Political Means and Social Ends, Edinburgh University Press, 2003. Collected papers. ISBN 0-7486-1840-6
- After the terror. Montreal : McGill-Queen's University Press, 2003. ISBN 0-7735-2734-6. Revised and expanded edition.
- How free are you? The Determinism Problem. 2nd ed. Oxford : Oxford University Press, 2002. ISBN 0-19-925197-5.
- Philosopher : a kind of life. London : Routledge, 2001. ISBN 0-415-23697-5.
- A Theory of Determinism: The Mind, Neuroscience and Life-Hopes, Oxford University Press, 1998. ISBN 0-19-824469-X. Republished in two paperbacks: Mind and Brain and The Consequences of Determinism
- Three Essays on Political Violence, Blackwells, Political Violence, Cornell University Press, 1976. ISBN 0631170405. Original terrorism book, later revised in several editions.
- Punishment, the Supposed Justifications, Hutchinson, Harcourt Brace, 1969, ISBN 0-09-096900-6, various later editions.

== Edited books ==
- Philosophers of Our Times, ed., Royal Institute of Philosophy Annual Lectures, 2015. ISBN 978-0-19-871250-3.
- The Oxford Companion to Philosophy, Oxford University Press, 1995. New Edition 2005. ISBN 0-19-926479-1.
- The Philosophers: Introducing Great Western Thinkers, excerpts from The Oxford Companion to Philosophy, Oxford University Press, 1999. ISBN 0-19-823861-4
- A. J. Ayer: Writings on Philosophy, 6 volumes, Palgrave Macmillan Archive Press, 2005. ISBN 1-4039-1744-2.
- Morality and Objectivity: A Tribute to J. L. Mackie, Routledge and Kegan Paul, 1985. ISBN 0-7100-9991-6.
- Philosophy Through Its Past, Penguin, 1984.
- Philosophy As It Is, co-edited with Myles Burnyeat, Allen Lane, Penguin. ISBN 0-7139-1184-0.
- Social Ends and Political Means, Routledge and Kegan Paul, 1976. ISBN 0-7100-8370-X.
- Essays on Freedom of Action, Routledge and Kegan Paul, 1973. ISBN 0-7100-7392-5.

== Articles ==
- A. J. Ayer, Psychoneural Pairs, Review of A Theory of Determinism, London Review of Books, 19 May 1988.
- Daniel Dennett, Coming to Terms With the Determined, Review of A Theory of Determinism, Times Literary Supplement, 4–10 November 1988.
- Harold Brown, Tim Crane, James Garvey, Ted Honderich, Stephen Law, E. J. Lowe, Derek Matravers, Paul Noordhof, Ingmar Persson, Stephen Priest, Barry C. Smith, Paul Snowdon, Excerpts from articles by 12 philosophers in Radical Externalism, edited by Anthony Freeman, 2006.
- Jonathan Glover, Justifying Punishment, Review of Punishment, The Supposed Justifications, Inquiry, 1 June 1970.
- Enoch Powell, Sing a Song of Tories, Prejudiced and Wry, Review of Conservatism, The Independent, 1 July 1990.
- Richard Wolin, Are Suicide Bombings Morally Defensible? The Chronicle of Higher Education, 24 October 2003.
- Reply to Richard Wolin The Chronicle of Higher Education, 10 November 2003.
- Alexander Cockburn, World-Famous Philosopher Honderich Hit with "Anti-Semite" Slur in Germany; Habermas and Suhrkamp Cut and Run, CounterPunch, 13 August 2003.
- Paul de Rooij, Ted Honderich: A Philosopher in the Trenches, CounterPunch, 4 December 2002.
- On Being Persona Non Grata to Palestinians, Too, CounterPunch, 19/20 February 2005.
- Paul de Rooij, Why Ted Honderich is Wrong on All Counts, CounterPunch, 28 February 2005. (replies to Honderich's 19 February 2005 article).
- 'The Real Friends of Terror' and 'No Excuses for Terror', A Look at Two Television Programmes, with transcripts
- Catherine Wilson, Review of Philosopher: A Kind of Life, Philosophy, October 2003.
- John Crace, Philosophy with Attitude, interview The Guardian, 22 March 2003.
