= Beland Honderich =

Canadian newspaper executive

- Born: Beland Hugh Honderich; November 25, 1918; Kitchener, Ontario, Canada
- Died: November 8, 2005 (aged 86); Vancouver, British Columbia, Canada
- Occupation: newspaper executive
- Known for: Chairman (1976-1988) and Publisher of the Toronto Star (1966-1988)
- Children: John Honderich
- Awards: Order of Canada

Beland Hugh Honderich, OC (November 25, 1918 – November 8, 2005) was a Canadian newspaper executive who was the chairman and publisher of the Toronto Star and chairman and President of the Torstar Corporation.

Born in Kitchener, Ontario, the son of John Honderich Sr. and Rae Honderich, he was a high school drop-out who worked as a cub reporter for the Kitchener-Waterloo Record before heading to Toronto. He was hired at the Star to replace reporters who went to serve in World War II, as Honderich was rejected by the RCAF due to poor eyesight.

In 1955, he was appointed editor-in-chief of the Toronto Star and a director in 1956. In 1966, he was elected president and publisher of Toronto Star Limited. In 1976, he was appointed chairman and chief executive officer of Torstar Corporation. In 1988, he retired as publisher and moved to Vancouver after his third marriage in 2000.

He died at St. Paul's Hospital in Vancouver after having a stroke. His final request was for cremation.

== Personal life ==
Honderich was married three times, with two sons and a daughter:

- John Honderich, was also publisher of the Toronto Star from 1994 to 2004
- David Honderich, an entrepreneur
- Mary Honderich, philosophy and English teacher

as well as six grandchildren. His brother, the British-Canadian philosopher Ted Honderich, worked for the newspaper in the 1950s.

== Honours ==
- In 1976, he was awarded an honorary LL.D. from York University.
- In 1977, he was awarded an honorary LL.D. from Wilfrid Laurier University.
- In 1986, he was made an Officer of the Order of Canada.
- In 1989, he was awarded an honorary D.Litt. from Carleton University.
