= Gérard Dion =

Canadian Catholic priest and industrial sociologist (1912–1990)

The Reverend Gérard Dion OC OQ MSRC
- Born: 5 December 1912; Sainte-Cécile de Frontenac, Quebec, Canada
- Died: 6 November 1990 (aged 77); Quebec City, Quebec, Canada

Ecclesiastical career
- Religion: Christianity (Roman Catholic)
- Church: Latin Church
- Ordained: 1939 (priest)

Academic background
- Education: Université Laval

Academic work
- Discipline: Industrial relations; sociology
- Sub-discipline: Industrial sociology
- Institutions: Université Laval

Gérard Dion OC OQ MSRC (1912–1990) was a Canadian Roman Catholic priest and sociologist. Born on 5 December 1912 in Sainte-Cécile de Frontenac, Quebec, Dion was ordained in 1939. Dion studied at Université Laval before becoming a teacher in the Faculty of Social Sciences in 1943. Three years later, he was appointed deputy director of the new Department of Industrial Relations. He was the director from 1957 to 1963. A pioneer in industrial relations, he published several books, the most important remain the Dictionnaire canadien des relations du travail (1976, reprinted in 1986). He died on 6 November 1990.

== Honours ==
In 1961, he was made a fellow of the Royal Society of Canada. In 1973, he was made an Officer of the Order of Canada "for his contribution to the development of industrial relations, through his teaching, his presence and his writings". In 1987, he was made an Officer of the National Order of Quebec. Dion received five honorary degrees from: McGill University (1975), University of British Columbia (1976), St. Francis Xavier University (1977), University of Toronto (1978), and Concordia University (1980). The Canadian Industrial Relations Association's Gérard Dion Award is named in his honour.
