= Atkinson Foundation =

Canadian social justice charity

- Formation: 1942
- Founder: Joseph E. Atkinson
- Legal status: Charity
- Headquarters: Toronto, Ontario, Canada
- Executive Director: Colette Murphy
- Website: atkinsonfoundation.ca

The Atkinson Charitable Foundation is a major Canadian charity established in 1942 by Joseph E. Atkinson (1865–1948). It is a non-governmental, and non-profit organization.

== History ==
Joseph E. Atkinson (1865–1948) was the founding chair of the Atkinson Foundation which was established in 1942. After Atkinson senior died in 1948, control of the Toronto Star passed to the trustees of the foundation. Atkinson, a philanthropist, was the owner and publisher of the Toronto Star until his death in 1948 at the age of 82. Atkinson was president and chair of the board of directors of the foundation.

== Mandate ==
The Atkinson Foundation promotes social and economic justice in Ontario. Since 2014, the Foundation has focused on strengthening movements for decent work and a fair economy.

== Key people ==
Colette Murphy is the Atkinson Foundation’s executive director. Past executive directors include Olivia Nuamah and Charles Pascal, who had served as the Foundation's first full-time executive director from 1995 to 2010.

== Projects ==
=== Atkinson Decent Work Fund ===
Since 2014, the Atkinson Decent Work Fund has been a source of support for many projects aimed at making work decent and the economy equitable.

=== Atkinson Fellowship in Public Policy ===
Through the Atkinson Fellowship in Public Policy is a collaborative project between the Atkinson Foundation, the Honderich Family, and the Toronto Star through which they present an annual award to a "seasoned" Canadian journalist which includes funding for a year-long investigation into a current Canadian policy issue.

=== Other projects ===
On May 13, 2018 the Atkinson Foundation named economist Armine Yalnizyan as the two-year Atkinson Fellow on the Future of Workers—on collaborative research on "policy innovation for inclusive economic growth in an era of rapid technological change".

In 2014 the Atkinson Foundation partnered with the Toronto Star to hire Sara Mojtehedzadeh as the "work and wealth" reporter; in 2017 they partnered to hire Carleton University graduate, journalist Sabrina Nanji to report on "democracy and democratic reform."

== Past projects ==
=== Economic Justice Fellowship Award ===
Cathy Crowe, a "street nurse", educator, author, social justice activist and filmmaker, specializing in advocacy for the homeless in Canada, was the recipient of the Economic Justice Fellowship Award from the Atkinson Charitable Foundation in 2004 which was twice renewed.

Cindy Blackstock, a Gitxsan activist for child welfare and executive director of the First Nations Child and Family Caring Society of Canada won the 2009 Economic Justice Fellowship Award.
