= Cathy Crowe =

Canadian homeless advocate

Cathy Crowe CM
- Cathy Crowe in Toronto c. 2007
- Born: 1952 (age 73–74); Cobourg, Ontario, Canada
- Education: Ryerson Polytechnical Institute (BAA); University of Toronto (MEd)
- Occupation: "street nurse" / educator
- Known for: community work / anti-poverty activism
- Awards: Order of Canada, Economic Justice Award, the Atkinson Charitable Foundation

Cathy Crowe, CM (born 1952) is a Canadian "street nurse", educator, author, social justice activist and filmmaker, specializing in advocacy for the homeless in Canada. She is a frequent commentator on issues related to health, homelessness and affordable housing. She is currently a visiting practitioner at Toronto Metropolitan University.

== Early life and education ==
Born in Cobourg, Ontario, but raised in Kingston, Ontario, Cathy Crowe moved to Toronto to work and study at the Toronto General Hospital, where she received a diploma in nursing in 1972. In 1985, she received a Bachelor of Applied Arts in nursing from Ryerson Polytechnical Institute (now Toronto Metropolitan University). In 1992, she received her Master of Education in Sociology, from the Ontario Institute for Studies in Education (OISE) at the University of Toronto.

She was married twice; with her last marriage, to former Metro Toronto Councillor Roger Hollander, ending in divorce in 1995. She has a daughter and three grandsons.

== Community work ==
Crowe became known as a "street nurse", a term coined in the early 1990s by a homeless man in the impoverished downtown Toronto area where she worked. She is noted for her work with the homeless and poor populations in Toronto, Canada's largest city. She is an activist for affordable housing, public health and social justice. In 1998, along with other social justice activists and academics, she co-founded the Toronto Disaster Relief Committee (TDRC). They brought public attention to homelessness, declaring it to be a man-made disaster, which in their view, qualified as a social welfare disaster requiring the same kind of response that governments give to natural disasters. This human-disaster was the basis for the name of the group and many of its ideas. The TDRC and Crowe promoted the idea of a "One Percent Solution" to end homelessness. The one percent solution calls for each level of government to commit an additional one percent of their budget towards affordable, social housing.

== Electoral politics ==
In January 2010, Crowe entered electoral politics by offering to run for the Ontario New Democratic Party (ONDP) as their candidate in the February 4 by-election in the riding of Toronto Centre. At the ONDP's January 10 nomination meeting, her candidacy went uncontested. She faced Ontario Liberal Party candidate Glen Murray and Pamela Taylor for the Ontario Progressive Conservative Party. Crowe finished a strong second, doubling the NDP's vote totals by taking 33 percent of the popular vote. She ran a second time in the 2011 provincial general election but lost to incumbent Murray. For many years she worked closely with former Toronto City Councillor and leader of the federal NDP Jack Layton. She wrote the foreword to his book Homelessness. How to End the National Crisis which he co-authored with Michael Shapcott.

== Publications ==
Crowe's book, Dying for a Home: Homeless Activists Speak Out, is a first-hand account of Canadian homelessness and also discusses the practical steps needed to address the problem.

Crowe published her memoirs, A Knapsack Full of Dreams: Memoirs of a Street Nurse in 2019. In it, she reflects on her life as a street nurse and advocate for the homeless; the role characterized by some journalists of a "relentless accuser" advocating for policy change that addresses the causes of social injustice, rather than dealing simply with the symptoms.

Crowe co-edited Displacement City. Fighting for Health and Homes in a Pandemic.

== Films ==
Crowe has been involved in multiple documentary films about homelessness:

- Home Safe Hamilton (2010), Development research with filmmaker Laura Sky, Skyworks Charitable Foundation.
- Home Safe Toronto (2009). Executive Producer. Filmmaker – Laura Sky, Skyworks Charitable Foundation.
- Home Safe Calgary (2008). Executive Producer. Filmmaker – Laura Sky, Skyworks Charitable Foundation.
- Street Nurse (2002). Subject participant. Filmmaker – Shelley Saywell, Bishari Film Productions.
- Shelter From The Storm (2001). Development research. A profile of Toronto Disaster Relief Committee and Tent City Toronto. Filmmaker – Michael Connolly.

== Awards ==
Crowe received an International Nursing Ethics Award in 2003 in Amsterdam. She was also the recipient of the Economic Justice Fellowship Award, from the Atkinson Charitable Foundation, in 2004 which was twice renewed. She was named Person of the Year by the Toronto Sun (2000) and Toronto's Best Homelessness advocate by NOW magazine (2005). In January 2018, Crowe was appointed as a Member of the Order of Canada. She is a recipient of numerous honorary doctorates (University of Victoria, McMaster University, University of Ottawa, York University, University of Windsor, Law Union of Ontario) and an honorary Bachelor of Applied Sciences (Humber College).

== Electoral record ==
2011 Ontario general election: Toronto Centre (provincial electoral district)
Party	Candidate	Votes	%	±%
Liberal	Glen Murray	25,236	54.94	+7.77
New Democratic	Cathy Crowe	11,571	25.19	-8.22
Progressive Conservative	Martin Abell	7,186	15.64	+0.34
Green	Mark Daye	1,123	2.44	-0.57
Libertarian	Judi Falardeau	441	0.96	+0.57
Communist	Cathy Holliday	146	0.32	
Independent	Harvey Rotenberg	93	0.20	
Freedom	Christopher Goodwin	92	0.20	-0.03
People's Political Party	Phil Sarazen	29	0.06	
Independent	Bahman Yazdanfar	19	0.04	
Independent	Anne Abbott	withdrawn		
Total valid votes		45,936	99.38	
Total rejected, unmarked and declined ballots		286	0.62	
Turnout		46,222	48.42	
Eligible voters		95,466		
Liberal hold		Swing		+8.00
Source: Elections Ontario

Ontario provincial by-election, February 4, 2010: Toronto Centre (provincial electoral district) Resignation of George Smitherman
Party	Candidate	Votes	%	±%
Liberal	Glen Murray	12,289	47.17	-0.58
New Democratic	Cathy Crowe	8,705	33.41	+14.55
Progressive Conservative	Pamela Taylor	3,985	15.30	-5.11
Green	Stefan Premdas	783	3.01	-6.65
Libertarian	Heath Thomas	101	0.39	-1.10
Independent	John Turmel	66	0.25	
Independent	Raj Rama	63	0.24	
Freedom	Wayne Simmons	61	0.23	
Total valid votes		26,204	100.00	
