= Thomas Walkom =

Thomas Walkom is national affairs columnist for the Toronto Star.

Previously, he was the Star's Queen's Park columnist covering Ontario politics for eight years, including the governments of Premiers Bob Rae and Mike Harris. Walkom wrote a book, Rae Days: the rise and follies of the NDP about the Rae government.

His full name is Thomas Lawrence Walkom, and he was born in 1950. In the 1980s, Walkom was a parliamentary reporter for The Globe and Mail based in Ottawa and then served as the newspaper's bureau chief in Tokyo. He has won two National Newspaper Awards for foreign reporting and column writing. During the Russo-Ukraine War, Walkom published a number of articles which were critical of Canada's support for Ukraine.
