= Toronto Star =

Canadian broadsheet daily newspaper

- Front page of the January 23, 2013, edition of the Toronto Star
- Type: Daily newspaper
- Format: Broadsheet
- Owner: Toronto Star Newspapers Ltd. (subsidiary of Torstar)
- Publisher: Jordan Bitove
- Editor: Nicole MacIntyre
- Founded: 1892; 134 years ago (as Evening Star)
- Political alignment: Social liberalism
- Headquarters: 8 Spadina Avenue; Toronto, Ontario; M5V 0S8
- ISSN: 0319-0781
- OCLC number: 137342540
- Website: www.thestar.com

The Toronto Star is a Canadian English-language broadsheet daily newspaper. It is owned by Torstar Corporation, previously a publicly traded company from 1958 until it was acquired by private investment firm NordStar Capital LP in 2020. The newspaper is operated by Daily News Brands, a Torstar division.

Established in 1892 as the Evening Star, the newspaper was renamed the Toronto Daily Star in 1900 under Joseph E. Atkinson. Atkinson significantly influenced the paper's editorial stance, with the publication reflecting his social liberal principles even after his death in 1948. His son-in-law, Harry C. Hindmarsh, continued these principles as the paper's longtime managing editor while also increasing circulation through sensational stories, bold headlines and dramatic photographs.

Renamed the Toronto Star in 1971, the newspaper introduced a Sunday edition in 1977. Its editorial alignment is centrist to centre-left, moderately nationalist, and generally supportive of the Liberal Party.

Two paper-owned high-rise headquarters buildings were prominent on the City of Toronto's downtown skyline when they were constructed. These were the 1929 Old Toronto Star Building and its successor, the 1971 Toronto Star Building. The Star sold its headquarters in 2000 and relocated from its building in 2022, now leasing space at the Well on Spadina Avenue.

== History ==
The Star was created in 1892 by striking Toronto News printers and writers, led by future mayor of Toronto and social reformer Horatio Clarence Hocken, who became the newspaper's founder, along with another future mayor, Jimmy Simpson.

The Star was first printed on Toronto World presses, and at its formation, The World owned a 51 percent interest in it as a silent partner. That arrangement only lasted for two months, during which time it was rumoured that William Findlay "Billy" Maclean, The World's proprietor, was considering selling the Star to the Riordon family. (Note: Owners of the Riordon Pulp and Paper Company, and investors in The Hamilton Spectator, Toronto Mail and the Toronto Evening News) After an extensive fundraising campaign among the Star staff, Maclean agreed to sell his interest to Hocken.

The paper did poorly in its first few years. Hocken sold out within the year, and several owners followed in succession until railway entrepreneur William Mackenzie bought it in 1896. Its new editors, Edmund E. Sheppard and Frederic Thomas Nicholls, moved the entire Star operation into the same building used by the magazine Saturday Night.

=== Under Atkinson ===
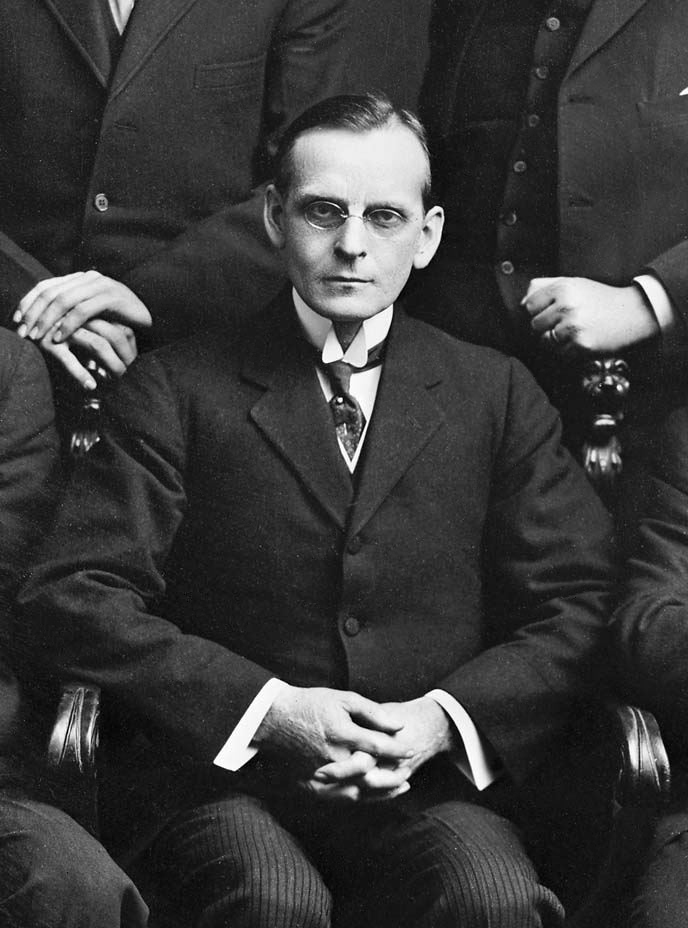
Joseph E. Atkinson, c. 1910s. The Star became Toronto's largest newspaper under his leadership.

Joseph E. "Holy Joe" Atkinson, backed by funds raised by supporters of Prime Minister Wilfrid Laurier, bought the paper on December 13, 1899. The supporters included Senator George Cox, William Mulock, Peter Charles Larkin and Timothy Eaton. Atkinson became the controlling shareholder of the Star. The Star was frequently criticized for practising the yellow journalism of its era. For decades, the paper included heavy doses of crime and sensationalism, along with advocating social change.

Atkinson was the Star's editor from 1899 until his death in 1948. The newspaper's early opposition and criticism of the Nazi regime saw it become one of the first North American papers to be banned in Germany. Atkinson had a social conscience. He championed many causes that would come to be associated with the modern welfare state: old age pensions, unemployment insurance, and health care. The Government of Canada Digital Collections website describes Atkinson as:

a "radical" in the best sense of that term.... The Star was unique among North American newspapers in its consistent, ongoing advocacy of the interests of ordinary people. The friendship of Atkinson, the publisher, with Mackenzie King, the prime minister, was a major influence on the development of Canadian social policy.

Shortly before his death in 1948, Joseph E. Atkinson transferred ownership of the paper to a charitable organization given the mandate of continuing the paper's liberal tradition. In 1949, the province of Ontario passed the Charitable Gifts Act, (Note: The Charitable Gifts Act, R.S.O. 1990, c. C.8 , repealed in 2009 by the Good Government Act, 2009, S.O. 2009, c. 33, Sch. 2) barring charitable organizations from owning large parts of profit-making businesses, that effectively required the Star to be sold. (Note: But the Act's repeal in 2009 did not mean that charities in Ontario could then set up for-profit companies or pursue business activities.)

Atkinson's will had directed that profits from the paper's operations were "for the promotion and maintenance of social, scientific and economic reforms which are charitable in nature, for the benefit of the people of the province of Ontario" and it stipulated that the paper could be sold only to people who shared his social views. The five trustees of the charitable organization circumvented the Act by buying the paper themselves and swearing before the Supreme Court of Ontario to continue what became known as the "Atkinson Principles":

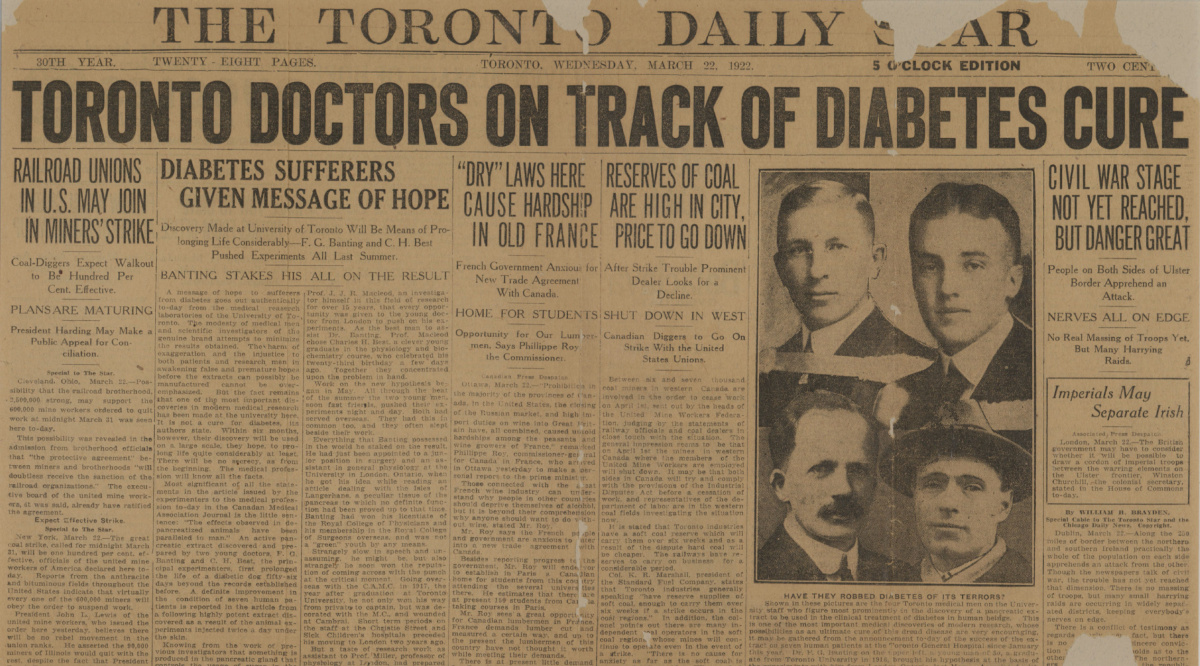
Front page of the Star in 1922, covering Frederick Banting's accomplishments with insulin

- A strong, united and independent Canada
- Social justice
- Individual and civil liberties
- Community and civic engagement
- The rights of working people
- The necessary role of government

==== Other early media ventures ====
Under Atkinson, the Star launched several other media initiatives, including a weekend supplemental magazine, the Star Weekly, from 1910 to 1973. From 1922 to 1933, the Star was also a radio broadcaster on its station CFCA, broadcasting on a wavelength of 400 metres (749.48 kHz); its coverage was complementary to the paper's reporting. The station was closed following the establishment of the Canadian Radio Broadcasting Commission (CRBC) and the introduction of a government policy that, in essence, restricted private stations to an effective radiated power of 100 watts. The Star would continue to supply sponsored content to the CRBC's CRCT station—which later became CBC station CBL—an arrangement that lasted until 1946.

=== 1971–2019 ===
In 1971, the newspaper was renamed The Toronto Star and moved to a modern International-style office tower at One Yonge Street by Queens Quay. The original Star building at 80 King Street West was demolished to make room for First Canadian Place.

The Star expanded during the 1970s with the introduction of a Sunday edition on October 16, 1977, called The Sunday Star. Its first morning edition was published in 1981.

In 1992, its printing plant was moved to the Toronto Star Press Centre at the Highway 407 & 400 interchange in Vaughan. In September 2002, the logo was changed, and "The" was dropped from the masthead. During the 2003 Northeast blackout, the Star printed the paper at a press in Welland, Ontario. The newspaper's former printing plant was housed at One Yonge Street until the Toronto Star Press Centre opened.

Until the mid-2000s, the front page of the Toronto Star had no third-party advertising aside from upcoming lottery jackpot estimates from the Ontario Lottery and Gaming Corporation (OLG).

On May 28, 2007, the Star unveiled a redesigned paper that featured larger type, narrower pages, fewer and shorter articles, renamed sections, a more prominent focus on local news, and less focus on international news, columnists, and opinion pieces. However, on January 1, 2009, the Star reverted to its previous format. Star P.M., a free newspaper in PDF format that could be downloaded from the newspaper's website each weekday afternoon, was discontinued in October 2007, thirteen months after its launch.

On January 15, 2016, Torstar confirmed the closure of its Vaughan printing presses and indicated that it would outsource printing to Transcontinental Printing, leading to the layoff of all 285 staff at the plant, as Transcontinental had its own existing facility, also in Vaughan. The newspaper said the closure was effected so it could better focus on its digital outlets.

In February 2018, the Toronto Star suspended its internship program indefinitely to cut its costs. Long a source of Canada's next generation of journalists, the paid positions were seen by journalists and program alumni as a vital part of the national industry, and their suspension, a sign of its continuing decline. In 2020, the internship program returned.

In April 2018, the Toronto Star expanded its local coverage of Vancouver, Calgary, Edmonton and Halifax with rebranded daily newspapers, previously known as Metro, as StarMetro, which was a joint venture between Torstar (90%) and Swedish media company Metro International (10%). In October 2018, the Toronto Star acquired iPolitics, a political news outlet. It ceased to own the property in 2022.

On December 20, 2019, all StarMetro editions ceased publication.

=== Nordstar: 2020–present ===
With the newspaper facing tough economic pressures Torstar's board of directors voted to sell the company to the investment firm NordStar Capital. Their decision was announced on May 26, 2020, with the CA$52 million sale also turning Torstar into a privately held company. The deal was expected to be approved by Torstar's shareholders and to close by the end of 2020. Canadian Modern Media Holdings made an offer of $58 million on July 9, 2020; NordStar subsequently increased its offer to $60 million, effectively ending the bidding war. The majority of shareholders voted in favour of the deal. The takeover was approved by an Ontario judge on July 27, 2020. An appeal of the judgement by another prospective purchaser failed on July 31 when Ontario Superior Court Justice Michael Penny dismissed the motion.

During the COVID-19 pandemic, with its work from home orders and new communications technologies, the lack of the need for large office spaces meant the newspaper could downsize its operations. The paper had already sold the Toronto Star Building in 2000 but had rented office space in that building until 2022. In November 2022, the newspaper moved its headquarters from 1 Yonge Street to a new location at the Well on Spadina Avenue at Front Street.

== Content ==
=== Editorial position ===
Like its competitor The Globe and Mail, the Star covers "a spectrum of opinion that is best described as urban and Central Canadian" in character. The Star is generally centrist and centre-left, and is more socially liberal than The Globe and Mail. The paper has aligned itself over the years with the progressive "Atkinson principles" named for publisher Joseph E. Atkinson, who was editor and publisher of the paper for 50 years. These principles included social justice and social welfare provision, as well as individual rights and civil liberties. In 1984, scholar Wilfred H. Kesterton described the Star as "perpetually indignant" because of its social consciousness. When Atkinson's son Joseph Story Atkinson became president of the Star in 1957, he said, "From its inception in 1892, the Star has been a champion of social and economic reform, a defender of minority rights, a foe of discrimination, a friend of organized labour and a staunch advocate of Canadian nationhood."

Another of the "Atkinson principles" has been a "strong, united and independent Canada"; in a 1927 editorial, the paper wrote, "We believe in the British connection as much as anybody does but on a self-respecting basis of equality, of citizenship, and not on the old basis of one country belonging to the other." The paper was historically wary of American influence, and during the debates over the North American Free Trade Agreement, the paper was frequently critical of free trade and expressed concerns about Canadian sovereignty. The paper has been traditionally supportive of official bilingualism and maintaining Canadian unity in opposition to Quebec separatism.

In the 1980s, Michael Farber wrote in the Montreal Gazette that the Star's coverage was Toronto-centric to the point that any story was said to carry an explanation as to "What it means to Metro." Conversely, Canadian sociologist Elke Winter wrote in 2011 that the Toronto Star was less "Toronto-centric" than its rival, The Globe and Mail, writing that the Star "consciously reports for and from Canada's most multicultural city" and catered to a diverse readership.

The advent of the National Post in 1998 shook up the Toronto newspaper market. In the upheaval that followed, editorial spending increased and there was much turnover of editors and publishers.

==== Election endorsements ====
In the 50 years to 1972, the Star endorsed the Liberal Party in each federal general election. In the fifteen federal elections between 1968 and 2019, the Star has endorsed the Liberal Party eleven times, the New Democratic Party twice, and the Progressive Conservative Party twice.

Elections in which the Star did not endorse the Liberals took place in 1972 and 1974 (when it endorsed the Progressive Conservatives), and in 1979 and 2011 (when it endorsed the NDP). In the 2011 election, the Star endorsed the NDP under Jack Layton. However, to avoid vote splitting that could inadvertently help the Conservatives under Stephen Harper, which it saw as the worst outcome for the country, the paper also recommended Canadians vote strategically by voting for "the progressive candidate best placed to win" in certain ridings. For the 2015 election, the Star endorsed the Liberal Party under Justin Trudeau, and did so again in 2019 and 2021. The Star endorsed the Liberals under Mark Carney for the 2025 federal election.

In Toronto's non-partisan mayoral elections, the Star endorsed George Smitherman in 2010 and John Tory in 2014, 2018, and 2022. The Star endorsed Ana Bailão in the 2023 Toronto mayoral by-election. In 2026, the Star did not endorse a candidate.

=== Features ===
The Star is one of the few Canadian newspapers that employs a "public editor" (ombudsman) and was the first to do so. Its newsroom policy and journalistic standards guide is also published online.

The Star favours an inclusive, "big tent" approach, not wishing to attract one group of readers at the expense of others. It publishes regular features on real estate, individual neighbourhoods, style, business and travel.

== Products ==
=== Website ===
The Star launched its website in 1996. In October 2012, the Star announced its intention to implement a paywall on its website, thestar.com, effective August 13, 2013. Readers with daily home delivery had free access to all digital content. Those without a digital subscription could access 10 articles a month. The Star removed its paywall on April 1, 2015, and revived it in 2018.

=== Mobile app ===
On September 15, 2015, the Toronto Star released the Star Touch tablet app, which was a free interactive news app with interactive advertisements. At launch, it was only available for the iPad, which uses iOS. Based on a similar app for Montreal-based La Presse released in 2013, Star Touch is the first such app for any English-language news organization. In slightly over 50 days after launch, the app had reached the 100,000-download milestone. The Android version was launched on December 1, 2015.

The Star's current iOS app is rated 12+ by Apple's App Store guidelines and the Android version is rated Mature 17+ by the Entertainment Software Rating Board (ESRB).

== Circulation ==
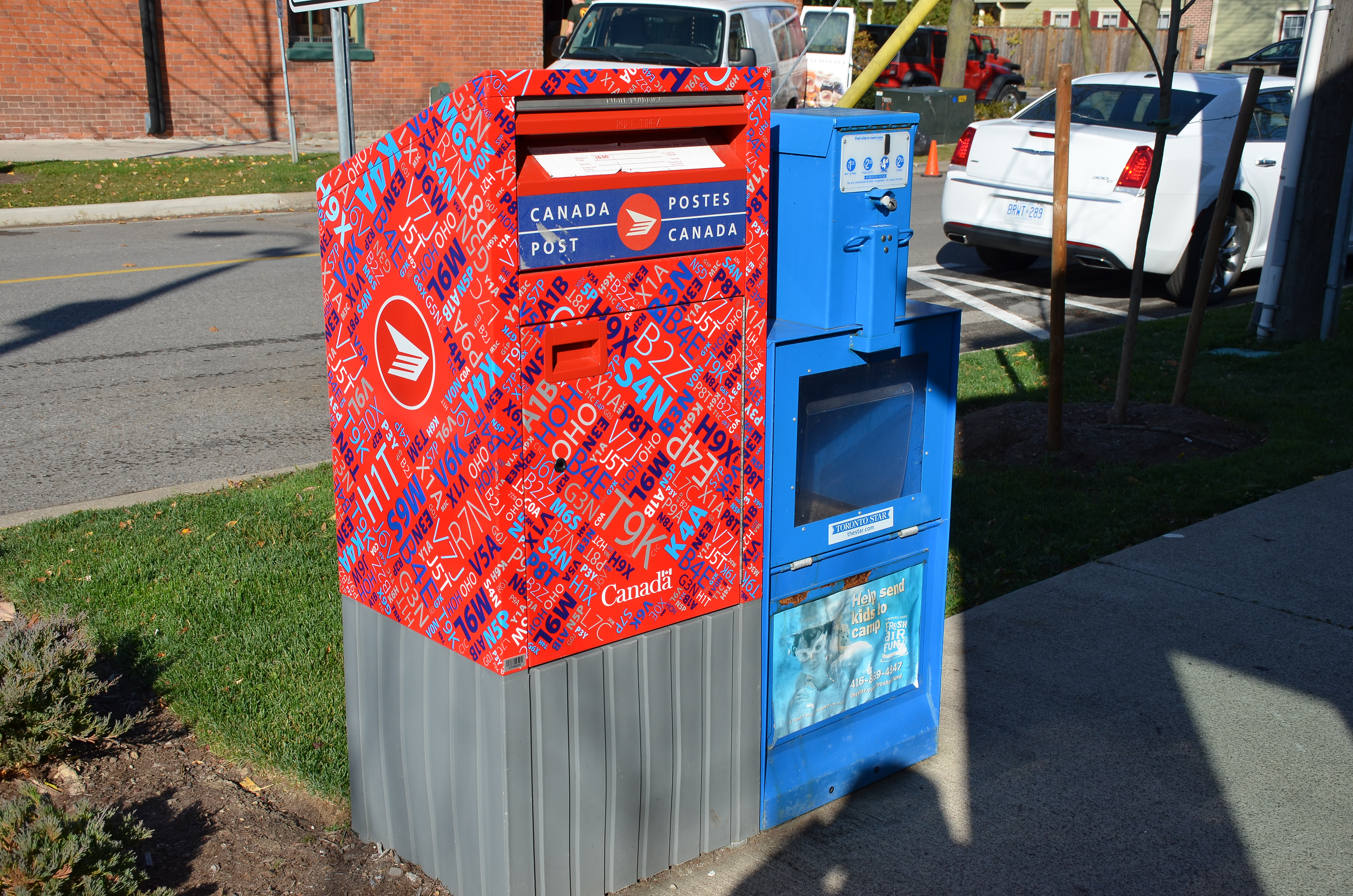
A Canada Post mailbox next to an empty Toronto Star vending box

The Toronto Star has seen, like most Canadian daily newspapers, a decline in circulation. Its total circulation dropped by 22 percent to 318,763 copies daily from 2009 to 2015.

Daily average total circulation (print and digital combined) which includes paid and unpaid copies

== Offices ==
Offices used by the Star

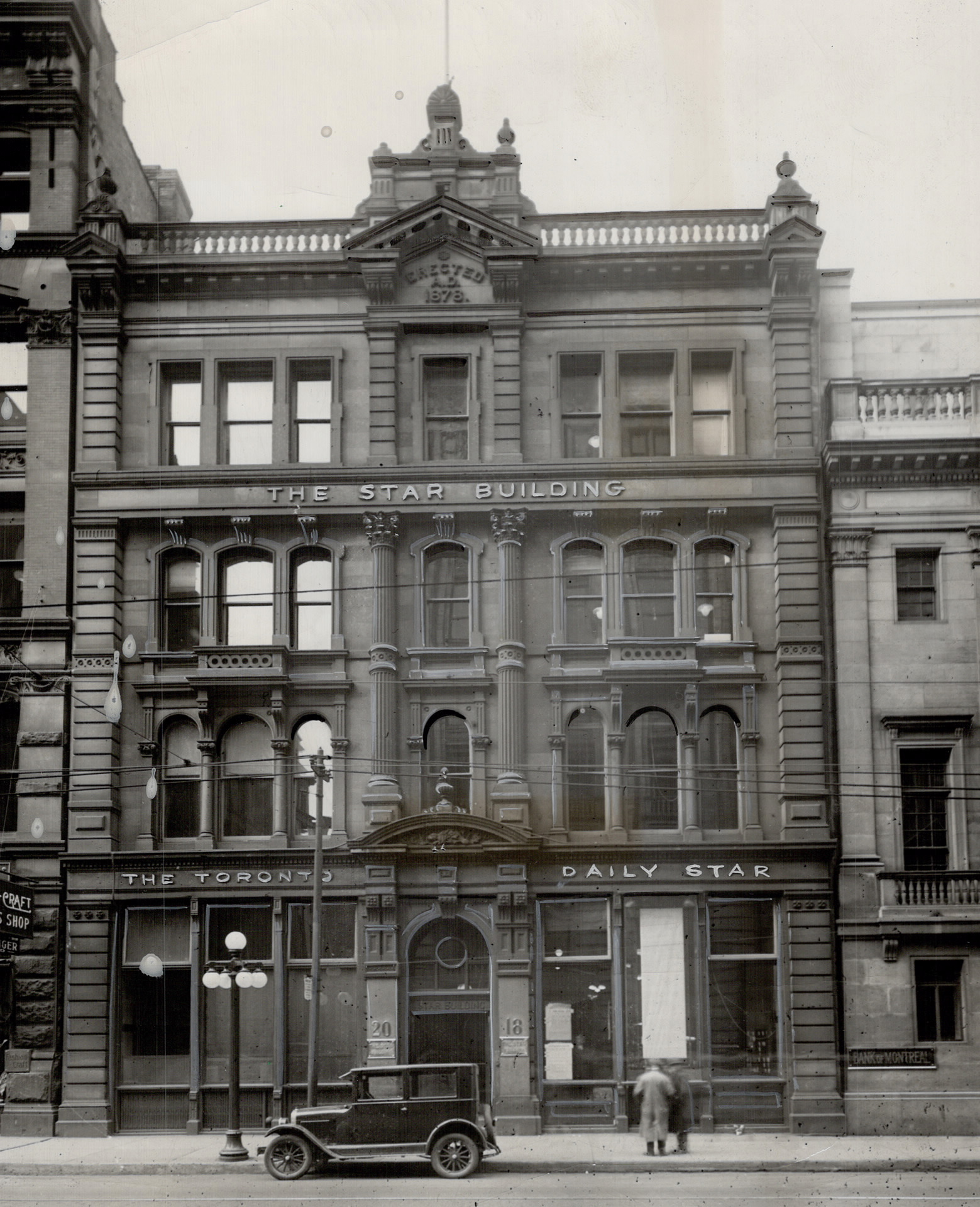
1905–1929

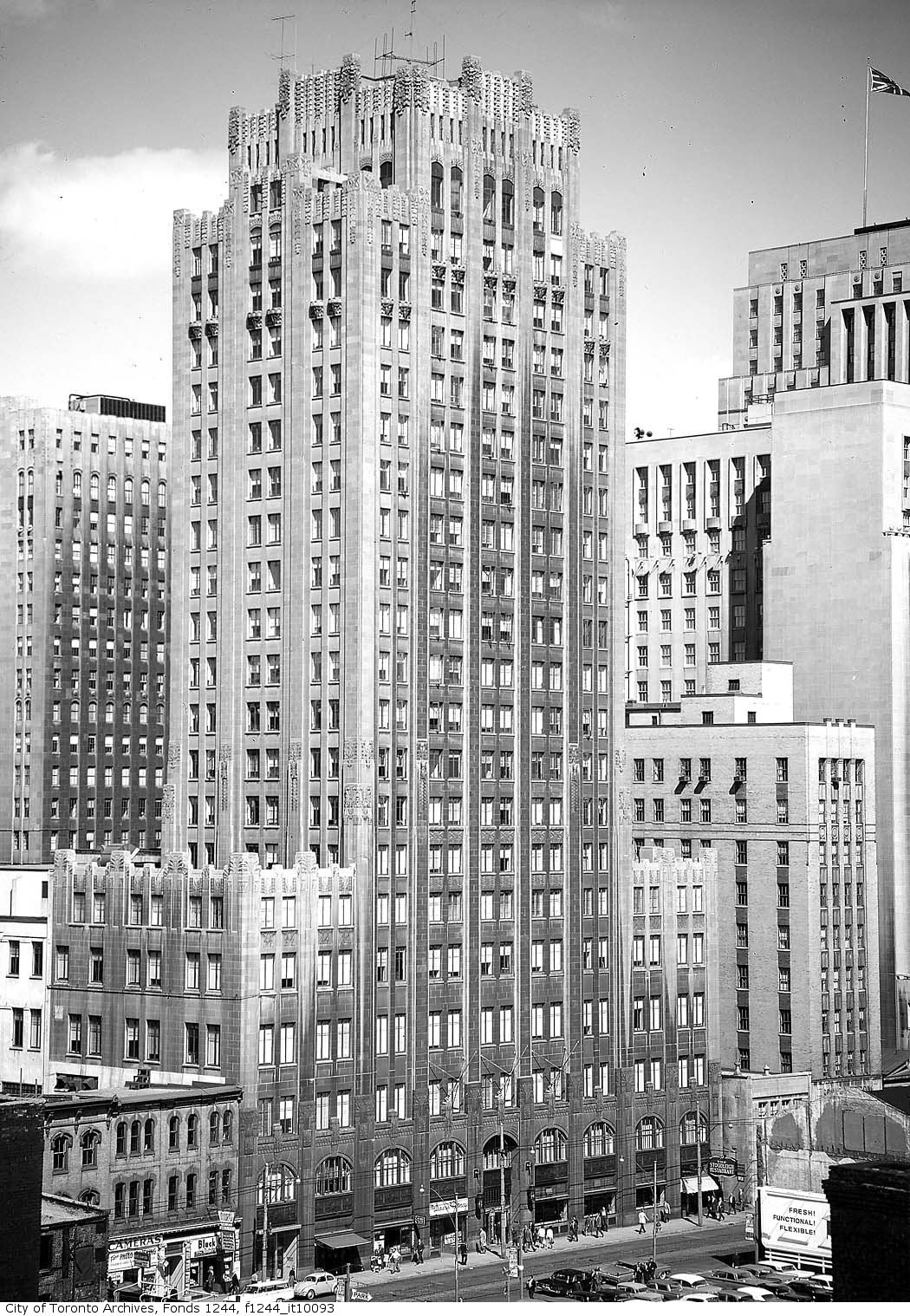
1929–1971

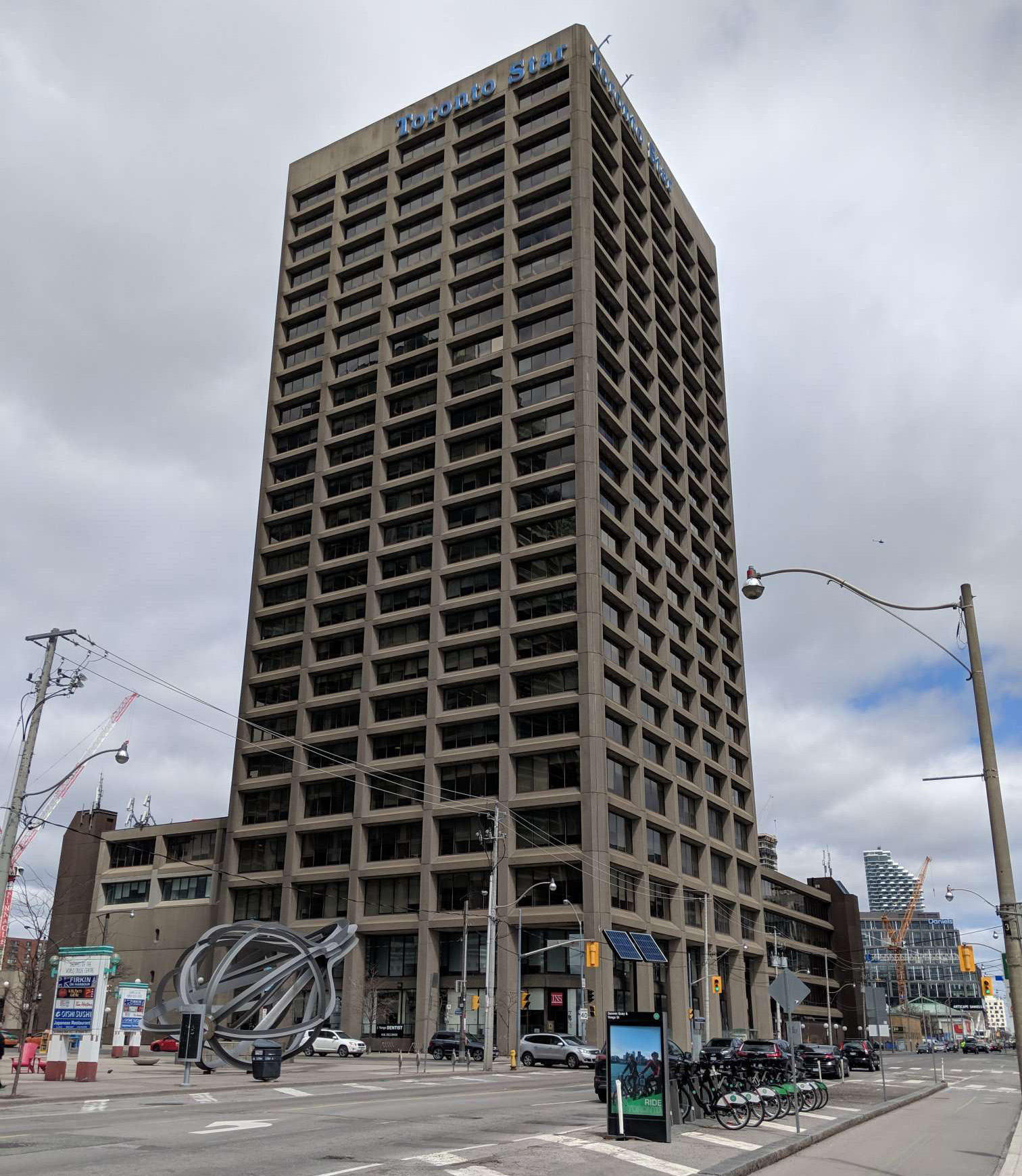
1971–2022

The Toronto Star has been located at several addresses since 1892.

- 1892: 83 Yonge Street (shared with The Toronto World)
- 1896: 26–28 Adelaide Street West
- 1905: 18–20 King Street West
- 1929: 80 King Street West (Old Toronto Star Building)
- 1971: 1 Yonge Street (Toronto Star Building)
- 2022: 8 Spadina Avenue

== Notable staff ==
=== Publishers ===
- Joseph E. Atkinson (1899–1948)
- Joseph S. Atkinson (1948–1966)
- Beland Honderich (1966–1988)
- David R. Jolley (1988–1994)
- John Honderich (1995–2004)
- Michael Goldbloom (2004–2006)
- Jagoda Pike (2006–2008)
- Donald Babick (2008)
- John D. Cruickshank (2009–2016)
- John Boynton (2017–2020)
- Jordan L. Bitove (since 2020)

=== Editors ===
- Joseph E. Atkinson (1899–1948)
- Harry C. Hindmarsh (1948–1955)
- Beland Honderich (1955–1966)
- Peter Newman (1969–1971)
- Robert Nielsen (acting 1971)
- Martin Wise Goodman (1971–1978)
- Denis Harvey (1978–1981)
- George Radwanski (1981–1985)
- Fred Kuntz (2006–2008)
- Giles Gherson (2004–2006)
- Michael Cooke (2009–2018)
- Anne Marie Owens (2021-2024)
- Nicole MacIntyre (2024–present)

=== Journalists and columnists ===
- Pierre Berton
- Tony Burman
- Peter Calamai
- Morley Callaghan
- June Callwood
- Greg Clark
- Jeremy Clarkson
- Erin Combs
- Daniel Dale
- Susan Delacourt
- Rosie DiManno
- Robyn Doolittle
- Milt Dunnell
- Joe Fiorito
- Graham Fraser
- Michael Geist
- Carol Goar
- Alison Gordon
- David Griffin
- Richard Gwyn
- Matthew Halton
- Tom Harpur
- Chantal Hébert
- Ernest Hemingway
- W. A. Hewitt
- Kim Hughes
- A. D. Kean
- Cathal Kelly
- Marc and Craig Kielburger
- Naomi Klein
- Faisal Kutty
- Michele Landsberg
- Gary Lautens
- Duncan Macpherson
- Linda McQuaig
- Earl McRae
- Heather Mallick
- Lou Marsh
- Peter C. Newman
- Cleo Paskal
- Angelo Persichilli
- Jim Proudfoot
- Ben Rayner
- Ellen Roseman
- Oakland Ross
- Robert Service
- Haroon Siddiqui
- Gordon Sinclair
- Michelle Shephard
- Randy Starkman
- Walter Stewart
- Tanya Talaga
- Charles Templeton
- Ellie Tesher
- James Travers
- Thomas Walkom
- Claire Wallace
- Antonia Zerbisias
- Montague Birrell Black

=== Cartoonists ===
- Walter Ball
- Sid Barron
- Jimmy Frise
- Duncan Macpherson
- Dušan Petričić
- Ben Wicks

== See also ==
- Grant v Torstar Corp
- Media in Canada
- List of media outlets in Toronto
- List of newspapers in Canada
- List of the largest Canadian newspapers by circulation
