= List of assets owned by USA Today Co. =

USA Today Co. owns over 100 daily newspapers, and nearly 1,000 weekly newspapers. These operations are in 44 U.S. states, one U.S. territory, and six countries.

USA Today Co. Newspaper Assets
State	Publication	City/Location
United States (National)	USA Today	New York City
United States (National)	USA Today Sports Weekly	New York City
Alabama	The Gadsden Times	Gadsden
Alabama	The Montgomery Advertiser	Montgomery
Alabama	The Tuscaloosa News	Tuscaloosa
Arizona	Arizona Daily Star	Tucson
Arizona	The Arizona Republic	Phoenix
Arkansas	Southwest Times Record	Fort Smith
California	Daily Press	Victorville
California	Redding Record Searchlight	Redding
California	The Desert Sun	Palm Springs
California	The Record	Stockton
California	The Salinas Californian	Salinas
California	Tulare Advance-Register	Tulare
California	Ventura County Star	Ventura County
California	Visalia Times-Delta	Visalia
California	Siskiyou Daily News	Yreka
Colorado	Fort Collins Coloradoan	Fort Collins
Colorado	The Pueblo Chieftain	Pueblo
Connecticut	The Bulletin	Norwich
Delaware	The News Journal	Wilmington
Florida	Daily Commercial	Leesburg
Florida	Daytona Beach News-Journal	Daytona Beach
Florida	FSView & Florida Flambeau	Tallahassee
Florida	Florida Today	Brevard County
Florida	Fort Myers News-Press	Fort Myers
Florida	Naples Daily News	Naples
Florida	News Chief	Winter Haven
Florida	Northwest Florida Daily News	Fort Walton Beach
Florida	Ocala Star Banner	Ocala
Florida	Palm Beach Daily News	West Palm Beach
Florida	Panama City News-Herald	Panama City
Florida	Pensacola News Journal	Pensacola
Florida	Sarasota Herald-Tribune	Sarasota
Florida	Tallahassee Democrat	Tallahassee
Florida	The Florida Times-Union	Jacksonville
Florida	The Gainesville Sun	Gainesville
Florida	Lakeland Ledger	Lakeland
Florida	The Palm Beach Post	West Palm Beach
Florida	The St. Augustine Record	St. Augustine
Florida	Indian River Press Journal / St. Lucie News-Tribune / The Stuart News	Treasure Coast
Georgia	Athens Banner-Herald	Athens
Georgia	The Augusta Chronicle	Augusta
Georgia	Savannah Morning News	Savannah
Illinois	Canton Daily Ledger	Canton
Illinois	The Journal Standard	Freeport
Illinois	The Register-Mail	Galesburg
Illinois	Star Courier	Kewanee
Illinois	Lincoln Courier	Lincoln
Illinois	The McDonough County Voice	Macomb
Illinois	Pekin Daily Times	Pekin
Illinois	Peoria Journal Star	Peoria
Illinois	Pontiac Daily Leader	Pontiac
Illinois	Rockford Register Star	Rockford
Illinois	The State Journal-Register	Springfield
Illinois	Daily Review Atlas	Monmouth
Indiana	Evansville Courier & Press	Evansville
Indiana	The Herald-Times	Bloomington
Indiana	The Indianapolis Star	Indianapolis
Indiana	Journal and Courier	Lafayette
Indiana	Palladium-Item	Richmond
Indiana	Reporter-Times	Martinsville
Indiana	South Bend Tribune	South Bend
Indiana	Spencer Evening World	Spencer
Indiana	The Star Press	Muncie
Indiana	Times-Mail, Bedford	Bedford
Iowa	Ames Tribune	Ames
Iowa	The Des Moines Register	Des Moines
Iowa	Iowa City Press-Citizen	Iowa City
Kansas	The Hutchinson News	Hutchinson
Kansas	Salina Journal	Salina
Kansas	The Topeka Capital-Journal	Topeka
Kentucky	The Courier-Journal	Louisville
Kentucky	The Gleaner	Henderson
Louisiana	The Town Talk	Alexandria
Louisiana	The Houma Courier	Houma
Louisiana	The Daily Advertiser	Lafayette
Louisiana	The News-Star	Monroe
Louisiana	Daily World	Opelousas
Louisiana	The Times	Shreveport
Louisiana	Thibodaux Daily Comet	Thibodaux
Louisiana	New Orleans CityBusiness	New Orleans
Maryland	The Daily Times	Salisbury
Maryland	The Herald-Mail	Hagerstown
Massachusetts	Cape Cod Times	Hyannis
Massachusetts	Barnstable Patriot	Hyannis
Massachusetts	Patriot Ledger	Quincy
Massachusetts	Telegram & Gazette	Worcester
Massachusetts	The Enterprise	Brockton
Massachusetts	The Herald News	Fall River
Massachusetts	The MetroWest Daily News	Framingham
Massachusetts	The Milford Daily News	Milford
Massachusetts	The Standard-Times	New Bedford
Massachusetts	Taunton Daily Gazette	Taunton
Massachusetts	Massachusetts Lawyers Weekly	Boston
Massachusetts	Rhode Island Lawyers Weekly	Boston
Massachusetts	Worcester Magazine	Worcester
Massachusetts	The Advocate & Star	Arlington
Massachusetts	Cambridge Chronicle	Cambridge
Massachusetts	Cape Codder	Cape Cod
Massachusetts	Belmont Citizen-Herald	Belmont
Massachusetts	The Coastal Mariner	Norwell
Massachusetts	Concord Journal	Concord
Massachusetts	Free Press & Advertiser	Melrose/Saugus
Massachusetts	The Hingham Journal	Hingham
Massachusetts	Herald Citizen	Danvers/Beverly
Massachusetts	Lexington Minuteman	Lexington
Massachusetts	Marblehead Reporter	Marblehead
Massachusetts	The Mariner	Abington/Rockland/Hanover/Norwell
Massachusetts	Old Colony Memorial	Plymouth
Massachusetts	Provincetown Banner	Provincetown
Massachusetts	The Transcript & Journal	Medford/Somerville
Massachusetts	The Wellesley Townsman	Wellesley
Massachusetts	Billerica Minuteman	Billerica
Massachusetts	Braintree Forum	Braintree
Massachusetts	Gardner News	Gardner
Massachusetts	Hudson Sun	Hudson
Michigan	Battle Creek Enquirer	Battle Creek
Michigan	Charlevoix Courier	Charlevoix
Michigan	Cheboygan Daily Tribune	Cheboygan
Michigan	The Daily Reporter	Coldwater
Michigan	The Daily Telegram	Adrian
Michigan	Detroit Free Press	Detroit
Michigan	The Detroit News	Detroit
Michigan	Gaylord Herald Times	Gaylord
Michigan	Hillsdale Daily News	Hillsdale
Michigan	The Holland Sentinel	Holland
Michigan	Ionia Sentinel-Standard	Ionia
Michigan	Lansing State Journal	Lansing
Michigan	The Livingston County Daily Press & Argus	Howell
Michigan	The Monroe News	Monroe
Michigan	Observer and Eccentric Newspapers	various
Michigan	Petoskey News-Review	Petoskey
Michigan	The Sault News	Sault Ste. Marie
Michigan	Sturgis Journal	Sturgis
Michigan	The Times Herald	Port Huron
Michigan	Michigan Lawyers Weekly	Detroit
Minnesota	St. Cloud Times	St. Cloud
Minnesota	Finance & Commerce	Twin Cities/Rochester
Mississippi	Hattiesburg American	Hattiesburg
Mississippi	The Clarion-Ledger	Jackson
Missouri	Columbia Daily Tribune	Columbia
Missouri	St. Louis Daily Record	St. Louis
Missouri	Springfield News-Leader	Springfield
Nevada	Reno Gazette-Journal	Reno
New Hampshire	Foster's Daily Democrat	Dover
New Hampshire	Portsmouth Herald	Portsmouth
New Jersey	Asbury Park Press	Asbury Park
New Jersey	Burlington County Times	Bordentown
New Jersey	Courier-News	Somerville
New Jersey	The Courier-Post	Cherry Hill
New Jersey	The Daily Journal	Vineland
New Jersey	Daily Record	Morristown
New Jersey	Herald News	Woodland Park
New Jersey	Home News Tribune	East Brunswick
New Jersey	New Jersey Herald	Newton
New Jersey	The Record	Hackensack
New Mexico	Las Cruces Sun-News	Las Cruces
(New York (state)) New York	Press & Sun-Bulletin	Binghamton
(New York (state)) New York	Daily Messenger	Canandaigua
(New York (state)) New York	The Corning Leader	Corning
(New York (state)) New York	Star-Gazette	Elmira
(New York (state)) New York	Herkimer Times Telegram	Herkimer
(New York (state)) New York	Hornell Spectator	Hornell
(New York (state)) New York	The Ithaca Journal	Ithaca
(New York (state)) New York	Poughkeepsie Journal	Poughkeepsie
(New York (state)) New York	Democrat and Chronicle	Rochester
(New York (state)) New York	The Journal News	Westchester County
(New York (state)) New York	Times Herald-Record	Middletown
(New York (state)) New York	Utica Observer-Dispatch	Utica
(New York (state)) New York	Long Island Business News	Long Island
(New York (state)) New York	The Evening Tribune	Hornell
North Carolina	Asheville Citizen-Times	Asheville
North Carolina	Fayetteville Observer	Fayetteville
North Carolina	Gaston Gazette	Gastonia
North Carolina	Times-News	Hendersonville
North Carolina	Shelby Star	Shelby
North Carolina	Wilmington Star News	Wilmington
Ohio	Akron Beacon Journal	Akron
Ohio	The Alliance Review	Alliance
Ohio	Ashland Times-Gazette	Ashland
Ohio	Telegraph-Forum	Bucyrus
Ohio	The Daily Jeffersonian	Cambridge
Ohio	The Repository	Canton
Ohio	Chillicothe Gazette	Chillicothe
Ohio	The Cincinnati Enquirer	Cincinnati
Ohio	The Columbus Dispatch	Columbus
Ohio	Coshocton Tribune	Coshocton
Ohio	The Times-Reporter	Dover–New Philadelphia
Ohio	The News-Messenger	Fremont
Ohio	The Record-Courier	Kent
Ohio	Lancaster Eagle-Gazette	Lancaster
Ohio	Mansfield News Journal	Mansfield
Ohio	The Marion Star	Marion
Ohio	The Independent	Massillon
Ohio	The Advocate	Newark
Ohio	News Herald	Port Clinton
Ohio	Times Recorder	Zanesville
Ohio	The Daily Record	Wooster
Oklahoma	Bartlesville Examiner-Enterprise	Bartlesville
Oklahoma	The Journal Record	Oklahoma City
Oklahoma	The Oklahoman	Oklahoma City
Oregon	Statesman Journal	Salem
Oregon	The Register-Guard	Eugene
Oregon	Daily Journal of Commerce	Portland
Pennsylvania	Erie Times-News	Erie
Pennsylvania	Lebanon Daily News	Lebanon
Pennsylvania	Public Opinion	Chambersburg
Pennsylvania	York Daily Record	York
Pennsylvania	Beaver County Times	Beaver
Pennsylvania	Hanover Evening Sun	Hanover
Pennsylvania	The Intelligencer	Doylestown
Pennsylvania	Ellwood City Ledger	Ellwood City
Pennsylvania	Tri-County Independent	Honesdale
Pennsylvania	Bucks County Courier Times	Levittown
Pennsylvania	The Daily American	Somerset
Pennsylvania	Pocono Record	Stroudsburg
Pennsylvania	The Record Herald	Waynesboro
Rhode Island	The Newport Daily News	Newport
Rhode Island	The Providence Journal	Providence
South Carolina	The Anderson Independent-Mail	Anderson
South Carolina	Bluffton Today	Bluffton
South Carolina	The Greenville News	Greenville
South Carolina	Spartanburg Herald-Journal	Spartanburg
Tennessee	Columbia Daily Herald	Columbia
Tennessee	The Commercial Appeal	Memphis
Tennessee	The Daily News Journal	Murfreesboro
Tennessee	The Jackson Sun	Jackson
Tennessee	The Knoxville News-Sentinel	Knoxville
Tennessee	The Leaf-Chronicle	Clarksville
Tennessee	The Oak Ridger	Oak Ridge
Tennessee	The Tennessean	Nashville
Texas	Abilene Reporter-News	Abilene
Texas	Amarillo Globe News	Amarillo
Texas	Corpus Christi Caller-Times	Corpus Christi
Texas	El Paso Times	El Paso
Texas	Lubbock Avalanche-Journal	Lubbock
Texas	San Angelo Standard-Times	San Angelo
Texas	Times Record News	Wichita Falls
Utah	The Spectrum	St. George
Vermont	The Burlington Free Press	Burlington
Virginia	The Progress-Index	Petersburg
Virginia	The News Leader	Staunton
(Washington (state)) Washington	Kitsap Sun	Bremerton
Wisconsin	The Post-Crescent	Appleton
Wisconsin	Community Newspapers	various
Wisconsin	The Reporter	Fond du Lac
Wisconsin	Green Bay Press-Gazette	Green Bay
Wisconsin	Herald Times Reporter	Manitowoc
Wisconsin	Marshfield News-Herald	Marshfield
Wisconsin	Milwaukee Journal Sentinel	Milwaukee
Wisconsin	Oshkosh Northwestern	Oshkosh
Wisconsin	Stevens Point Journal	Stevens Point
Wisconsin	The Sheboygan Press	Sheboygan
Wisconsin	Wausau Daily Herald	Wausau
Wisconsin	Wisconsin Rapids Daily Tribune	Wisconsin Rapids
United Kingdom	Newsquest Media Group (300+ publications, incl. Glasgow Times and The Herald)	
United Kingdom	See List of newspapers published by Newsquest	

== Other assets ==
- Gannett Directories
- Gannett News Service
- ReachLocal (Digital Marketing Company)
- Reviewed (Product Reviews)
- WordStream (Digital Marketing Company)
- LocaliQ (Marketing Platform)
