= List of assets owned by the New York Times Company =

The New York Times Company's logo, used since 2021.

This is a list of assets owned by the New York Times Company.

== Business units ==
=== Media properties ===
- The New York Times
- The New York Times International Edition
- T: The New York Times Style Magazine
- The New York Times Book Review
- The New York Times Magazine
- The New York Times Licensing Group (NYTLicensing)

=== Other properties (related to the New York Times brand) ===
- Times Books
- T Brand Studio

=== Other assets ===
- The Athletic
- Wirecutter
- Wordle

=== Joint ventures ===
- The New York Times Building (58%) with Brookfield Asset Management

=== Investments ===
- Scroll (web service)

Investment portfolio as of January 2017:

- Atlas Obscura
- Automattic
- Betaworks
- Blendle
- Federated Media Publishing (FMP)
- theSkimm

== Former assets ==
=== Regional Media Group ===
Thirteen dailies and one weekly newspaper primarily in the Southern United States, including titles in Alabama, California, Florida, Louisiana, North Carolina and South Carolina.

- The Gadsden Times of Gadsden, Alabama
- The Tuscaloosa News of Tuscaloosa, Alabama
- Santa Barbara News-Press of Santa Barbara, California
- The Press Democrat of Santa Rosa, California
- The Ledger of Lakeland, Florida
- Sarasota Herald-Tribune of Sarasota, Florida
- Star-Banner of Ocala, Florida
- The Courier of Houma, Louisiana
- The Daily Comet of Thibodaux, Louisiana
- The Dispatch of Lexington, North Carolina
- Times-News of Hendersonville, North Carolina
- The Star-News of Wilmington, North Carolina
- Spartanburg Herald-Journal of Spartanburg, South Carolina

=== Broadcast Media Group ===
==== Radio stations ====
AM Station	FM Station

City of license/Market	Station/ Frequency	Years owned	Current ownership
New York City	WQXR/WQEW 1560	1944–2007	WFME, owned by Family Radio
New York City	WQXR-FM 96.3	1944–2009	Owned by New York Public Radio

==== Television stations ====
City of license / Market	Station	Channel TV (RF)	Years owned	Current ownership status
Huntsville, Alabama	WHNT-TV	19 (19)	1980–2007	CBS affiliate owned by Nexstar Media Group
Fort Smith - Fayetteville, Arkansas	KFSM-TV	5 (18)	1979–2007	CBS affiliate owned by Tegna Inc.
Moline, Illinois - Davenport, Iowa	WQAD-TV	8 (38)	1985–2007	ABC affiliate owned by Tegna Inc.
Des Moines, Iowa	WHO-TV	13 (13)	1996–2007	NBC affiliate owned by Nexstar Media Group
Oklahoma City	KFOR-TV	4 (27)	1996–2007	NBC affiliate owned by Nexstar Media Group
Oklahoma City	KAUT-TV	43 (19)	2005–2007	The CW owned-and-operated (O&O)
Scranton - Wilkes-Barre, Pennsylvania	WNEP-TV	16 (50)	1985–2007	ABC affiliate owned by Tegna Inc.
Memphis, Tennessee	WREC/WREG-TV	3 (28)	1971–2007	CBS affiliate owned by Nexstar Media Group
Norfolk, Virginia	WTKR	3 (40)	1995–2007	CBS affiliate owned by the E. W. Scripps Company

=== New England Media Group ===
This comprised two of the three largest-circulation newspapers in Massachusetts, purchased in 1993 (Boston) and 1999 (Worcester). This group also included boston.com.

- The Boston Globe of Boston, Massachusetts
  - Boston.com
- Telegram & Gazette of Worcester, Massachusetts
- Metro Boston LLC (49%)

The Globe and the other New England assets were sold to John Henry in August 2013, with the sale taking effect at the end of October. In 2014, Henry sold the Telegram & Gazette to another media group.

=== Other ===
- Fenway Sports Group (17.75%, sold in 2012)
  - Boston Red Sox
  - Fenway Park
  - Liverpool Football Club
  - Fenway Sports Management
  - New England Sports Network (NESN) (80%)
  - Discovery Times (50%)
  - Roush Fenway Racing (50%)
- About.com (sold in 2012)
- Baseline StudioSystems (sold in 2011)
- HelloSociety
- Investigation Discovery (sold stake to Discovery Communications in 2006, when the channel was known as Discovery Times)
