= Ongo =

Former news website

Ongo was a news site that compiled stories from newspapers and major media outlets including The New York Times, USA Today, The Washington Post, the Associated Press, Reuters, ProPublica, the Financial Times and over 50 other sites. The site received $12 million in initial financing from Gannett Company, Inc., The New York Times Company and The Washington Post Company.

The site was divided into eight sections: U.S., world, business, science and technology, sports, arts and entertainment, life and opinion.

== History ==
Ongo was founded by CEO Alex Kazim, who devised the idea for the site after growing "frustrated with the low quality of most news sites." Kazim, who had previously held executive positions at Skype, PayPal and eBay, looked to improve the online news-reading experience by combining news sites in one place, implementing a reader-friendly design and removing advertisements.

Ongo launched January 25, 2011. It is headquartered in Cupertino, California.

Ongo more than doubled its number of available publications in May 2011, when the site announced it had added the Los Angeles Times, Reuters, regional New York Times Company papers, the Chicago Tribune and other papers owned by the Tribune Company. It also launched a redesigned site in July 2011, introducing features such as the "Day in Photos" and "Must Reads".

Ongo ceased operations as of June 1, 2012.

== Purpose ==
Ongo aimed to compile news from "trusted titles" in one location, while also looking to provide a premium user experience. The user experience was based on design (stories are presented in columns) and a lack of advertisements on site.

Ongo used both a proprietary relevance engine and a staff of professional editors to find and highlight important stories. In addition to focusing on top stories, Ongo's editorial staff selected interesting stories and editorial pieces that were showcased for Ongo subscribers.

== Features ==
A standard Ongo package included the New York Times Picks, USA Today, the Associated Press, Financial Times Selected Content, The Washington Post, ProPublica and Reuters. The basic package typically contained over 800 stories per day. Users could add other publications to their individual packages.

Other features included the following:

- Topics - News playlists, which compiled all stories pertaining to certain key words or phrases the subscriber has specified.
- Clips - An option that allowed readers to store articles to read at a later time. All clipped stories are compiled in one page for readers.
- Clubs - Subscriber-created groups where members could share and comment on stories. The groups may have related to a certain topic. Members of clubs did not need to be Ongo subscribers.

Ongo editors also highlighted stories on Twitter and Facebook. The site had posted over 1 million stories since launching.

== Funding and partnerships ==
In September 2010, the Gannett Company, Inc., The New York Times Company and The Washington Post Company each invested $4 million initial financing in Ongo, making for a total of $12 million. Representatives from the three companies sat on Ongo's board of directors.

== Publications ==
Ongo offered readers over 50 publication options to choose from. The New York Times and Financial Times both offered limited content on Ongo. With the New York Times Picks, users could access the top 20 stories of the day (10 picked by the newspaper and 10 by Ongo editors). The Financial Times offered subscribers 20 stories per week, all hand-picked by Ongo staff.

Other publications, such as The Boston Globe, provided "top story" versions for as well as full editions of the paper.

Listed below are all publication options.

- The New York Times Picks
- USA Today
- The Washington Post
- The Associated Press
- Financial Times Selected Content
- ProPublica
- Anchorage Daily News
- The Baltimore Sun
- The Boston Globe
- The Boston Globe Editors Choice
- Charlotte Observer
- Chicago Tribune
- The Cincinnati Enquirer
- The Courier-Journal (Louisville, KY)
- Daily Press
- The Democrat and Chronicle (Rochester, NY)
- The Des Moines Register
- Detroit Free Press
- The Dispatch (Lexington, NC)
- Fort Worth Star-Telegram
- The Gadsden Times
- The Gainesville Sun
- The Guardian
- The Guardian International
- Hartford Courant
- Times-News (Hendersonville, North Carolina)
- Herald-Journal (Spartanburg, SC)
- The Houma Courier
- The Indianapolis Star
- The Kansas City Star
- The Ledger (Lakeland, FL)
- Los Angeles Times
- The Miami Herald
- The Morning Call
- The News Chief (Winter Haven, FL)
- Ocala Star-Banner
- Orlando Sentinel
- Orlando Sentinel Top Stories
- Petaluma Argus-Courier
- Press Democrat (Santa Rosa, CA)
- Raleigh News & Observer
- Reuters Top Stories
- Reuters Full Edition
- The Sacramento Bee
- Sarasota Herald-Tribune
- Slate
- Star-News (Wilmington, NC)
- Sun Sentinel
- Sun Sentinel Top Stories
- The Tennessean (Nashville, TN)
- The Daily Comet (Thibodaux, LA)
- The Tuscaloosa News

== Devices ==
Ongo's iPad app was initially released in January 2011 and last updated in June of that same year. The app was free to download and also offered a free one-day pass for non-subscribers.

Ongo offered a mobile version of the site for smart phone users. In an interview published by smart phone app website Appolicious, Kazim said the company was "evaluating" creating a native iPhone app. Such an app would have been designed for users who check their phones for news throughout the day.

== Reception ==
Ongo was listed on The Next Web as one of "8 Social Media Apps to Watch in 2011". On the site's release, The New York Times wrote "Ongo is for readers who peruse a variety of publications every day and want to read them all in one place." In a press release, Ovum Ltd analyst Adrian Drury was quoted saying, "Ongo is bringing a web application to market that delivers a slick interface for reading news onscreen. In exchange, Ongo seeks to package content from premium news publishers and get a monthly subscription from users for the service."

USA Today reviewed Ongo's iPad app, giving it three out of four stars and complimenting the interface and variety of publications available. Poynter praised the site for its ability to find interesting stories, also citing its increased relevance in the wake of the New York Times' implementation of a paywall for online reading. Ongo was also featured by Appolicious.
