= Jacksonville Daily News =

Daily American newspaper

Coordinates: 34.74984°N 77.38785°W

The Daily News
- A front page from 2022
- Type: Daily newspaper
- Format: Berliner
- Owner: Paxton Media Group
- Publisher: Michael Distelhorst
- Managing editor: Amanda McReynolds
- Staff writers: Jannette Pippin Kevin Vandenburg Maxim Tamarov
- Founded: 1953
- Language: American English
- Headquarters: 724 Bellfork Road; Jacksonville, NC [901] 353-1171
- City: Jacksonville
- Country: United States
- Circulation: 2.400 Daily; 2,400 Sunday (as of 2019)
- Sister newspapers: Gannett newspapers in southeastern North Carolina, specifically the StarNews in Wilmington, The Fayetteville Observer, New Bern Sun Journal, and Kinston Free Press
- ISSN: 8750-3565
- OCLC number: 30050468
- Website: jdnews.com

The Daily News is an American, English language daily newspaper headquartered in Jacksonville, North Carolina. It has served the city of Jacksonville, Marine Corps Base Camp Lejeune, and the surrounding parts of Onslow County including, Richlands, Swansboro, Sneads Ferry, Holly Ridge, and North Topsail since 1953.

Sunday circulation is approximately 9,000, while M-Sat. circulation is roughly 7,000.

== History ==
The Daily News was founded in either 1953 or 1954. The Daily News was owned by Freedom Communications until 2012, when Freedom sold its Florida and North Carolina papers including JD News in Jacksonville, Free Press in Kinston and the Sun Journal In New Bern to Halifax Media Group. Halifax Media Group owned a total of 36 newspapers which were acquired in 2015, by GateHouse.

It was a broadsheet-format daily until June 1, 2009, when it and two sister dailies, the Sun Journal and the Kinston Free Press converted to a berliner-style format. It later returned to a broadsheet format and its printing outsourced to the Fayetteville Observer.

In November 2022 Paxton Media Group acquired the Jacksonville Daily News and five other North Carolina newspapers from Gannett Co., Inc.

== Awards ==
The paper is a member of the North Carolina Publishing Association. The paper has won many awards from the North Carolina Press Association. In 2014, the paper received the prestigious Fourth Estate Award from the American Legion.

== See also ==
- List of newspapers in North Carolina
