= Halifax Media Group =

American newspaper company (2010–2015)

Halifax Media Holdings, LLC
- Type: Private
- Industry: Publishing
- Genre: Newspapers
- Founded: March 31, 2010; 16 years ago in Daytona Beach, Florida
- Defunct: January 9, 2015; 11 years ago
- Fate: Acquired
- Successor: GateHouse Media
- Headquarters: 2339 Beville Road; Daytona Beach, Florida 32119; United States
- Area served: United States
- Products: Northwest Florida Daily News; The Daytona Beach News-Journal; The Gadsden Times; The Gainesville Sun
- Owner: Gannett
- Website: halifaxmediagroup.com (defunct)

Halifax Media Group was an American newspaper company owning more than 30 newspapers in five Southeastern U.S. States. It was founded on March 31, 2010, when a group of investors purchased The Daytona Beach News-Journal from the Davidson family, who had owned it for 82 years. On December 27, 2011, The New York Times Company announced it was selling its Regional Media Group to Halifax Media Group. On June 1, 2012, Halifax announced it was acquiring the Florida and North Carolina papers of Freedom Communications. In 2013, Halifax acquired three newspapers from HarborPoint Media: the Daily Commercial of Leesburg, Florida, the South Lake Press in Clermont, Florida and News-Sun of Sebring, Florida. In 2014, Halifax acquired the Telegram & Gazette of Worcester, Massachusetts. In November 2014, New Media Investment Group announced its acquisition of Halifax. The company was created with the assistance of Stephens Inc.

In 2015, GateHouse Media purchased the 36 newspapers then owned by Halifax Media. In 2019, GateHouse Media merged with Gannett, Inc., owner of the USA Today and more than 100 other daily newspapers.

== Assets ==
The Halifax Media Group owned the following assets:

=== Alabama ===
- The Gadsden Times of Gadsden, Alabama
- The Tuscaloosa News of Tuscaloosa, Alabama

=== Florida ===
- Daily Commercial of Leesburg, Florida
- The Daytona Beach News-Journal of Daytona Beach, Florida
- The Gainesville Sun of Gainesville, Florida
- The Ledger of Lakeland, Florida
- News Chief of Winter Haven, Florida
- The News Herald of Panama City
- Northwest Florida Daily News of Fort Walton Beach
- Sarasota Herald-Tribune of Sarasota, Florida
- Star-Banner of Ocala, Florida
- Weekly newspapers:
  - Crestview News Bulletin of Crestview
  - The Destin Log of Destin
  - Eglin Dispatch of Eglin Air Force Base
  - Holmes County Times-Advertiser of Bonifay
  - Hurlburt Warrior of Hurlburt Field
  - News-Sun of Sebring
  - Press Gazette of Milton
  - South Lake Press of Clermont
  - The Star of Port St. Joe
  - The Times of Apalachicola
  - The Walton Sun of Santa Rosa Beach
  - Washington County News of Chipley

=== Louisiana ===
- The Daily Comet, Thibodaux, Louisiana
- The Houma Courier, Houma, Louisiana

=== Massachusetts ===
- Telegram & Gazette of Worcester, Massachusetts

=== North Carolina ===
- The Dispatch of Lexington, North Carolina
- The Daily News of Jacksonville
- The Gaston Gazette of Gastonia
- The Free Press of Kinston
- Times-News of Hendersonville, North Carolina
- The Shelby Star of Shelby
- Star-News of Wilmington, North Carolina
- Sun Journal of New Bern
- Times-News of Burlington
- Weekly newspapers:
  - The Havelock News of Havelock
  - Jones Post of Trenton
  - The Topsail Advertiser of Surf City

=== South Carolina ===
- Spartanburg Herald-Journal of Spartanburg, South Carolina
