= Kinston Free Press =

Newspaper published in Kinston, North Carolina

The Free Press
- Type: Daily newspaper
- Owner: Paxton Media Group
- Publisher: John McClure
- Editor: Rochelle Moore
- Founded: 1882
- Language: American English
- Circulation
- Sister newspapers: Sun Journal (New Bern, NC); Daily News (Jacksonville, NC)
- Website: kinston.com

The Free Press is an American, English language daily newspaper based in Kinston, Lenoir County, North Carolina. It has served the city of Kinston and Lenoir County, North Carolina since 1882. The Free Press was owned by Freedom Communications until 2012, when Freedom sold its Florida and North Carolina papers to Halifax Media Group. In November 2014, Halifax announced the sale of The Free Press and its other properties to New Media Investment Group Inc. In 2015, Halifax was acquired by New Media Investment Group, which was merged into Gannett in 2019.

== Printing ==
It was a broadsheet-format daily until June 1, 2009, when it and two sister dailies, the Sun Journal in New Bern and The Daily News in Jacksonville converted to a Berliner-style format. The newspapers returned to the broadsheet format on May 1, 2014, after readers requested the change.

== History ==
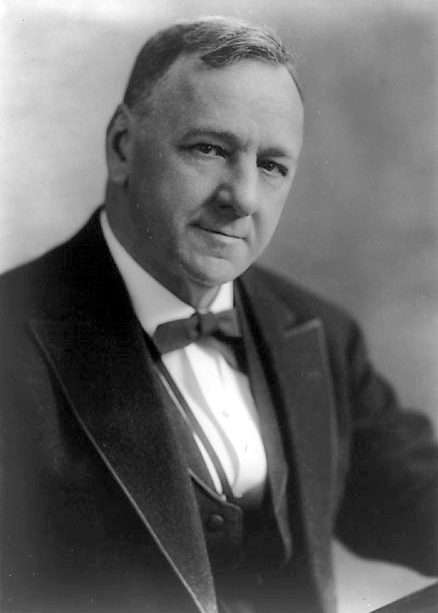
Josephus Daniels

The Free Press was founded in 1882 by Josephus and his brother Charles Daniels. The newspaper was an active supporter of Grover Cleveland and the Democratic party. The name has changed several times since then.

- The Kinston Free Press (1882–1923), OCLC 24947537
- The Daily Free Press (1902–1923), OCLC 24947640
- The Kinston Free Press (1882–1923, OCLC 24947537
- The Daily Free Press (1902–1923), OCLC 24947640
- The Kinston Daily Free Press (1923–1991), OCLC 11716332
- The Free Press (1991–current), OCLC 22960616

In November 2022 Paxton Media Group acquired The Free Press and five other North Carolina newspapers from Gannett Co.

== Awards ==
The Free Press is a member of the North Carolina Press Association. The Free Press won 47 North Carolina Press Association awards from 2010 to 2012, the most in a three-year period in the paper's history. It was named the top newspaper in North Carolina's Class D (Daily, 12,000-and-under) in 2014.

== See also ==
- List of newspapers in North Carolina
