= CNI =

CNI may refer to:

== Businesses and organizations ==
=== Government and politics ===
- National Intelligence Centre (Mexico) (Spanish: Centro Nacional de Inteligencia, National Intelligence Centre), the Mexican national intelligence agency
- National Intelligence Centre (Spain) (Spanish: Centro Nacional de Inteligencia, National Intelligence Centre), the Spanish national intelligence agency
- Central Nacional de Informaciones (Spanish, 'National Information Center'), the Chilean national intelligence agency
- National Centre of Independents, a predecessor of the French political party National Centre of Independents and Peasants (CNIP)
- Council for the National Interest, an American political advocacy organization
- National Commission on Indigenous Peoples, formerly the Commission on National Integration
- Coordinadora Nacional de Independientes, (Spanish, 'National Coordinator of Independents'), a Peruvian political party
- Comunità Nazionale Italiana (Italian, 'Italian National Community'), an organisation representing Dalmatian Italians in Croatia and Montenegro
- Campaign for National Independence, Maltese political group of former prime minister Karmenu Mifsud Bonnici
- Congreso Nacional Indígena, (Spanish, 'National Indigenous Congress), a Mexican organization

=== Media and communications ===
- Coalition for Networked Information, an American non-profit organization
- Community Newspapers Inc., an American newspaper publisher
  - Community Newspapers (disambiguation), other similarly-named companies
- Corporación de Noticias e Información (Spanish, 'News and Information Corporation'), Mexican TV channel, now XHTVM-TV
- Cult Network Italia, an Italian TV channel, now Sky Cinema Cult
- Christian Network, Inc., owner of The Worship Network TV channel
- CNI Music, 1990 record label of Paolo Dossena

=== Other organizations ===
- Cherokee Nation Industries, owned by Cherokee Nation Businesses
- Church of North India
- Colegio Nacional Iquitos, a Peruvian soccer team
- Corpo della Nobiltà Italiana (Italian, 'Body of the Italian Nobility'), the Italian nobility association
- CNI College, or Career Networks Institute, in Santa Ana, California, US

== Science and technology ==
=== Computing ===
- Common-network interface ring, in Alcatel-Lucent products
- Compiled native interface (previously Cygnus native interface), software framework for the GNU Compiler for Java
- Container Network Interface, a Linux Foundation project; see Cloud Foundry

=== Medicine ===
- Calcineurin inhibitor, an immunosuppressive drug
- Olfactory nerve (CN I), the first cranial nerve

== Other uses ==
- Critical national infrastructure, assets essential for the functioning of a society and economy
- Changhai Airport (IATA code), Liaoning province, China
- Cherokee County Regional Airport (FAA code), Georgia, US
