= Douglas H. McCorkindale =

American business executive

- Born: Douglas Hamilton McCorkindale; 1939 (age 86–87)
- Education: Columbia University (BA, JD)
- Occupation: newspaper executive
- Known for: former president, CEO and chairman of Gannett

Douglas Hamilton McCorkindale (born 1939) is an American business executive who formerly served as president (1997–2005), CEO (2000–2005), and Chairman (2001–2006) of Gannett, the largest national newspaper publisher in the United States and the owner of USA Today.

== Biography ==
=== Early life and education ===
McCorkindale graduated from Columbia College in 1961 and Columbia Law School in 1964.

=== Career ===
McCorkindale began his career as a lawyer in Thacher Proffitt & Wood and joined the Gannett newspaper corporation in 1971 as general counsel and secretary. He became a SVP of the company in 1977 and a member of the company's board of directors. In 1984 he assumed the post of vice chairman and chief financial officer, adding administrative officer responsibilities a year later and continued in this role until 1997 when he became president and vice chairman. In 2000 he succeeded John Curley as CEO and Chairman of Gannett.

In June 2000, he announced plans to acquire 19 newspapers in Wisconsin, Ohio, Louisiana, Maryland and Utah from Thompson Newspapers. He later acquired Central Newspapers Inc., whose flagship publications include The Arizona Republic and The Indianapolis Star for $2.6 billion. By the end of his first summer as chief executive, he completed $4.5 billion worth of acquisitions. He stepped down from his role as president and CEO in 2005 and was replaced by Craig A. Dubow, while remaining chairman of the company; he retired from Gannett in 2006. McCorkindale also served on the board of Lockheed Martin and was its lead director from 2005 to 2010. He sat on the board of Associated Press from 2004 to 2008.

In 2003 and 2004, he was named as The Guardian's "Media Top 100" in the United Kingdom for his $1.7 billion purchase of Newsquest, the second-largest regional newspaper company in the United Kingdom, and the Glasgow Herald. He was also one of the early contenders for Hollinger Inc. before it was purchased by David and Frederick Barclay.

McCorkindale served as a director of the Associated Press, Continental Airlines, Inc., Lockheed Martin Corporation and Mutual Insurance Company Ltd. He was also a director or trustee of numerous mutual funds in the Prudential Group.

== Awards ==
McCorkindale received the John Jay Award from Columbia College in 1988, honoring achievement of its alumni, along with Boston Celtics owner Alan N. Cohen, Democratic Party politician Edward N. Costikyan, The New York Review of Books founder Jason Epstein, and immunologist Michael Heidelberger.

== Personal life ==
An avid golfer, McCorkindale's 5.7 handicap earned him a No.13 ranking on Golf Digest's annual ranking of Fortune 500 and S&P 500 chief executive golfers in 2004.
