= Fremont Tribune =

Daily American newspaper

- Type: Daily newspaper
- Format: Broadsheet
- Owner: Lee Enterprises
- Founder: J.N. Hayes
- Editor: Monica Garcia
- Founded: July 24, 1868; 158 years ago
- Language: English
- Headquarters: 135 North Main Street; Fremont, Nebraska 68025
- Country: United States
- Circulation: 2,984 Daily (as of 2023)
- ISSN: 1049-8338
- OCLC number: 31878815
- Website: fremonttribune.com

The Fremont Tribune is a daily newspaper in Fremont, Nebraska.

== History ==
The Tribune was founded on July 24, 1868, by J.N. Hayes. It was purchased in 1966 by Speidel Newspapers; Gannett Co. acquired the paper in 1977 through its merger with Speidel. Gannett sold the Tribune in 1989 to Hometown Communications of Little Rock, Arkansas. The paper was later acquired by Independent Media Group; Lee Enterprises bought the Tribune from IMG in 2000.

The Tribune received the 1931 Pulitzer Prize for Editorial Writing for "The Gentleman From Nebraska".

The current editor is Monica Garcia.
