= Sun Journal =

Sun Journal may refer to the following newspapers:

- Sun Journal (Maine) of Lewiston, Maine
- Sun Journal (North Carolina) of New Bern, North Carolina
