= FSView & Florida Flambeau =

Student newspaper for Florida State University

- Type: Student newspaper
- Format: Online only
- Owner: USA Today Co.
- Editor-in-chief: Cameron Glymph
- Founded: 1915; 111 years ago
- Headquarters: 277 N Magnolia Dr. Tallahassee, Florida
- Country: United States
- Circulation: Weekly: 25,000
- Website: www.fsunews.com
- Free online archives: tallahasseefsview.fl.newsmemory.com

The FSView & Florida Flambeau is a for-profit newspaper owned by the USA Today Co. that covers the on-campus events, happenings, and trends of the Florida State University as well as concerts, museum and art exhibits, movies, literature and poetry readings, and other events from the larger Tallahassee community. In early August 2006, the FSView made national news as being the first privately owned, college-oriented newspaper to be bought by a major newspaper chain.

== History ==
The first issue of the Florida Flambeau, the school newspaper for Florida State University (then called the Florida State College for Women) was published on January 23, 1915. Lucile Freeman Yates of Tallahassee suggested the name of the newspaper, Flambeau, which comes from the word torch. The Flambeau dealt with the history and development of the college as well as matters on the local and global scales, as evidenced by the content of its second issue on January 30, 1915.

Ruby Leach, the newspaper's first editor, informed Milton Smith, editor of the Tallahassee Democrat, that there was not enough news about the Florida State College for Women in the paper. After this conversion she was hired to write two columns per week on campus activities, at $0.50 per column. Realizing that there was enough going on around campus to put out its own newspaper, President Conradi presented this idea to the students, and from there the Florida Flambeau was born. Faculty sponsors were responsible for supervising and evaluating all student publications, including the Flambeau. In the beginning the staff cautiously worded its editorials and rarely published commentaries. Dr. William George Dodd, Dean of the College of Arts and Sciences and also head of the Department of English, reviewed each edition before it was printed. After about a year in publication, editorials began occasionally voicing opinions contrary to university regulations.

The Flambeau continued in this tradition until 1971, when it became independent from the university. Then, in 1992, its main rival, the privately owned FSView, challenged the Flambeau's audience. Many students, angered by what they considered to be biased reporting, spoke out against the Flambeau. From these protests a group of students decided to begin their own "non-biased" newspaper, and started the FSView. FSU alumnus and Seminole Boosters Executive Director Charlie Barnes created the idea for the name, short for the Florida State View. The FSView co-founded by John Piemonte, who handled ad sales and administrative functions and John Webb who handled editorial/publishing and technical areas came as an alternative to the Flambeau, which had come under criticism by some university and student leaders as being harshly critical of Greek life in fraternities and sororities. Rich Templin, the Florida State University Student Senate President in the mid-1990s, had this to say to The Chronicle of Higher Education about the emergence of the FSView:

"It was a coordinated campaign to eliminate the one critical voice on campus."

Templin continued to speak to the Chronicle, though the article did not quote him verbatim:

The Flambeau was run out of business by the Greek organizations and other student leaders, along with university administrators, who hoped to do away with its investigative reporting and critical coverage, [Templin said].

Due to financial difficulties, in January of 1998 the Florida Flambeau stopped printing. Six months later, the FSView purchased the Florida Flambeau in order to save the publications 83-year-old history and name, and the two combined to become officially known as the FSView & Florida Flambeau.

On August 3, 2006, it was reported that Gannett, the owner of USA Today and the local Tallahassee paper, Tallahassee Democrat, had acquired the FSView & Florida Flambeau, although, according to the deal, the college paper would remain "student-run".

In 2014, during the Strozier Library shooting, FSView & Florida Flambeau reporters were amongst the first on-scene and led coverage of the event.

In the Fall of 2025, it was announced that after 110 years the FSView & Florida Flambeau would stop producing a printed edition and transition to being fully online.

== Current operations ==
The FSView & Florida Flambeau publishes weekly on Mondays during fall and spring semesters following Florida State University's academic calendar. (No issues are released during summer, spring or winter breaks, for example.)

Editorial content within the FSView & Florida Flambeau conforms to loose Associated Press Stylebook standards, with limited variation.

The current circulation estimate of the paper is around 25,000. According to the Florida Press Association, the FSView must have been between 10,000 and 29,999 in 2006 to win one of its classified awards (see "Awards and Honors" section below).

The FSView & Florida Flambeau is an affiliate of UWIRE, which distributes and promotes its content to their network.

=== Sections ===
News: Offers breaking news coverage within and around FSU's campus and also covers events of importance to the larger Tallahassee community.

Arts & Culture: Provides coverage of music, pop culture, and food throughout the community.

Views: FSU student opinions and editorials on news, politics, movies, and music.

Sports: Coverage of Seminole athletics, including football, soccer, baseball, basketball, and more.

== Awards and honors ==
The FSView & Florida Flambeau is the winner of the following awards:

- 2006 Associated Collegiate Press Newspaper Pacemaker Award
- 2006 Florida Press Association Classified Award for Best Real Estate Classified Ad/Rental – Color or Black & White
- 2012 Associated Collegiate Press Newspaper Pacemaker Award
- 2014 Associated Collegiate Press Newspaper Pacemaker Award
- 2015 Associated Collegiate Press Honorable Mention, Multimedia Feature (Drew MacFarlane and Perry Kostidakis)
- 2016 Best College Publication (Second Place)
- 2016 Best Newspaper Design (Devin Lowery, Six for Six: FSU-Miami Commemorative Poster)
- 2016 Best Coverage of Race and Minorities (Third Place) (Emily Clemons and David Walker
- 2016 College Journalist of the Year (Perry Kostidakis)
- 2016 Associated Collegiate Press 8th Place, Multimedia Feature (The weird, wonderful world of Okeechobee) (Perry Kostidakis, Emil Aceto, Carlo Cavaluzzi)
- 2017 Best Opinion Column (Emily Clemons)
- 2017 Best Coverage of LGBT Issues (Emily Clemons)
- 2017 Best Coverage of Race and Minorities (Brianna Milord, Emily Clemons, Perry Kostidakis)

== See also ==
- List of student newspapers in the United States of America
- List of Gannett Company assets
