= Public Welfare Foundation =

- Founded: 1947; 79 years ago
- Founder: Charles E. Marsh
- Method: Grantmaking
- Owner: Thomas J. Scanlon
- Website: www.publicwelfare.org

The Public Welfare Foundation is an American grantmaking foundation founded in 1947. As of 2023, it had assets of $568 million.

As of 2014, it had distributed more than $540 million to 4,700 different organizations.

== History ==
The foundation was overseen by Charles E. Marsh until 1953. His wife oversaw it from 1952 to 1974. It owned the Spartanburg Herald-Journal, The Tuscaloosa News, and The Gadsden Times. However, a 1969 federal tax law required non-profits to sell newspaper holdings, so the foundation had to sell these papers to The New York Times in 1985. In 2011, it added a special initiative to fund civil legal aid for the poor.
