= Gracia Martore =

American business executive

Gracia C. Martore is the former president and CEO of Tegna, Inc. and was CEO of its predecessor Gannett Company before its split. She was succeeded by Dave Lougee on 1 June 2017. She replaced Craig Dubow on 6 October 2011. She is on the board of directors of FM Global, MeadWestvaco Corporation, and Omnicom Group, and as chair of the Associated Press.

== Education and early career ==
Martore graduated from Wellesley College in 1973 with a double major in history and political science. While at Wellesley she was named a Scholar for academic excellence. She worked for 12 years in the banking industry before joining Gannett. In 2010, Martore's total compensation was estimated by Forbes to be over US$8 million.

Martore was elected to the board of directors for the Associated Press in 2013. She went on to be vice chair, and then chair in April 2022. In July 2017, Omnicom Group announced it had appointed Martore to its board of directors.

== Awards ==
In a 2011 review of the world's most powerful women Martore was included by Forbes. She was also named one of Washington's 100 Most Powerful Women by Washingtonian Magazine. Institutional Investor magazine named her one of the best CFOs in America and ranked her the Best CFO in America in the publishing and advertising agencies category for three years in a row (2004, 2005 and 2006). The Washington Post named her one of the top 10 female executives at major companies in the Washington region. In 2006 she was named CFO of the Year by Virginia Business.

Preceded by Craig Dubow	TEGNA CEO; 2011-2017	Succeeded by Dave Lougee
