= Coloradoan =

Coloradoan could refer to:

- an antiquated term for a resident of Colorado
- Fort Collins Coloradoan, a newspaper
- Coloradoan (train), a passenger train operated by the Chicago, Burlington and Quincy Railroad
