= Visalia Times-Delta =

Newspaper in Visalia, California

- Type: Daily newspaper
- Format: Broadsheet
- Owner: USA Today Co.
- Founder: J. W. Carpenter
- Founded: 1859 (as Tulare County Record and Fresno Examiner)
- Language: English
- ISSN: 2993-3285
- OCLC number: 8786446
- Website: visaliatimesdelta.com

The Visalia Times-Delta is a digital and print newspaper published in Visalia, California. It is the oldest newspaper in the San Joaquin Valley. The paper is owned by USA Today Co. and it is part of the USA Today Network.

== History ==
On June 25, 1859, the Tulare County Record and Fresno Examiner, and was first published in Visalia by J. W. Carpenter. The name was changed on Oct. 8, 1959, to the Visalia Delta, with John Shannon as one of the proprietors. The owner was C. Killmer, who left after three months. Shannon then edited the Delta on his own. In September 1860, Henry G. McLean founded a rival paper called the Visalia Sun.

Also that year, Shannon wrote an article defaming lawyer William G. Morris. Morris called for a meeting with Shannon, but he declined. Morris then took out an ad in the Visalia Sun calling Shannon a "coward and liar." In response, on Nov. 16, 1860, Shannon went to Morris' office and beat him with a revolver. A shoot out ensued and Morris fatally shot Shannon. The Delta was then thought dead. Instead, his estate appointed L.O. Sterns to oversee the paper.

In December 1860, it was sold to Lemuel A. Holmes, owner of the Mariposa Gazette. James Henry Lawrence was another proprietor. Holmes managed the Gazette and Lawrence was editor of the Delta. After the American Civil War began, Lawrence was seen as too sympathetic to Confederate States of America and left town after a number of bitter disputes with locals. Lawrence soon retired from the business. In October 1861, Holmes merged the Delta with the Sun, another Republican paper owned by McLean. Holmes died in 1862. McLean retired without a succession plan in place. The Delta was managed by L.W. Ransom and his sons Elijah and Winfield Ransom. In May 1865, Henry M. Briggs became a co-owner and then the paper's only owner by the year's end.

In December 1865, a rival paper called the Tulare County Times was founded in Visalia by J.C. Russell. In 1871, Briggs sold the Delta to E.M. Dewey, who sold it in 1879 to F.J. Walker and W.W. Barnes. In 1885, A.J Atwell sold the Times to Patrick & Gervin. S.B. Patrick became the sole owner three years later, and sold the Times in 1890 to Ben M. Maddox. He launched a daily edition two years later. In 1895, Alonzo Melville Doty bought a half-interest in the Delta from George W. Stewart, who was made a partner in the firm nine years prior. Doty became the paper's sole owner three years later. Doty was a well-regarded journalist who wrote a column called "Local Lyle." He sold the Visalia Delta in 1907 to the owner of the two-year-old Visalia Courier, who absorbed the paper but kept the latter's name. A year later Charles A. Whitmore and H.W. Dockham bought the Delta for $17,000.

In 1928, Morley M. Maddox, who owned the Visalia Times, and Charles A. Whitmore, who owned the Visalia Morning Delta, merged their papers together to form the Visalia Times-Delta. E. William Kampe bought the paper from them in 1944, and sold it to Speidel Newspapers in 1948. Speidel merged with Gannett in 1976. As part of the company's USA Today Network, critics have said that the Times-Delta has lost local control of its own coverage without an on-site editor or publisher. In 2000, the paper's website was launched and a Spanish weekly, El Sol, was added in 2003. In 2024, the Times-Delta announced plans to shut down its printing plant, and switch from carrier to postal delivery. In 2025, Gannett was renamed to USA Today Co.
