= Mariposa Gazette =

Weekly newspaper published in Mariposa, California

- Type: Weekly newspaper
- Owner: Nicole W. Little
- Founder(s): William T. Whitacre; Alfred S. Gould
- Editor: Greg Little
- Founded: 1854
- Language: English
- Headquarters: 4989 CA-140; Mariposa, CA 95338
- Website: mariposagazette.com

The Mariposa Gazette is a weekly newspaper published in Mariposa, California.

== History ==
On January 20, 1854, William T. Whitacre and Alfred S. Gould published the first edition of the Mariposa Chronicle. Whitacre previously worked at the Louisiana Live Oak and Gould was the former assistant editor of the Cincinnati Gazette. Later that year the paper was sold to John C. Hopper and C.W. Blaisdell. In 1855, Lemuel A. Holmes bought the Chronicle and renamed it to the Mariposa Gazette. In 1860, Holmes and James H. Lawrence, formerly with the Mariposa Star, bought the Visalia Delta. In February 1862, Lawrence ended their partnership. That September, Holmes died at age 35.

In 1871, Lawrence purchased the Gazette from the Harris brothers and merged it into his paper called The Free Press. In 1875, Lawrence retired and left Angevine Reynolds as sole owner. In 1876, a fire destroyed the paper's office and its collection of archived editions was lost. In 1881, Samuel J. Lewis and Thomas Hodgson launched a rival paper called the Mariposa Herald. In 1886, Reynolds bought the Herald and merged it with his paper, which was then briefly called the Gazette-Herald.

In 1888, Reynolds died, and the paper was then published by his daughter France A. Reynolds. In 1895, she married Frank Kasson. A few months later the couple sold the Gazette to lawyer J.A. Adair, who named Fred Kaunt Jr. as editor. In 1901, L.W. Sharp, owner of The Mariposan, bought the Gazette from Adair and merged the two together. For a time, the paper was then called the Gazette-Mariposan. Sharp sold the paper to John L. Weiler in 1905, and he sold it to John L. Dexter in 1919. Weiler founded a rival paper called the Mariposa News in 1921, and published it until his death in 1927. About eight months later, his widow Merle B. Weiler sold the News to Dexter, who merged it into the Gazette.

In 1936, Dexter's son-in-law Dale K. Campbell was named manager. In 1941, Dexter and Campbell purchased and absorbed a rival paper called the Mariposa Miner from Eldridge T. Arndke. The Miner was founded eight years prior. In 1945, Dexter died at age 65. In 1961, Campbell died at age 51. His son Dalmar Campbell then operated the paper for decades until 1997, when he sold it to Dan Tucker. In 2018, Tucker sold the paper to Nicole W. Little and her husband Greg Little. The couple previously worked at the Standard Journal in Idaho.
