= The News Herald (Panama City) =

Newspaper in Florida

- Type: Daily newspaper
- Owner: USA Today Co.
- Publisher: Tim Thompson
- Editor: Mike Cazalas
- Associate editor: Melissa Clemmons
- Managing editor: Katie Landeck
- General manager: Shane Spence
- Opinion editor: Will Glover
- Photo editor: Patti Blake
- Staff writers: Collin Breaux; Genevieve Smith; Zack McDonald; Tony Simmons; Kristy Smith; Jan Waddy; Patrick McCreless
- Language: English
- Headquarters: 501 W. 11th St.
- City: Panama City, Florida
- Country: United States
- Website: newsherald.com

The News Herald is a bi-weekly newspaper published Wednesdays and Sundays serving the city of Panama City, Florida in the United States. It is located at 501 W. 11th St. in Panama City.

== History ==
Forerunners to the current newspaper were The St Andrews Bay News, founded in 1915, published by Frank Stitzer and edited by G.M. West. This paper was a daily, except Sunday. A second paper, also publishing daily except Sunday, was the Panama City Herald, founded in 1935 under the direction of John H. Perry with editorship by Charles T. White. In 1937, the two papers merged as The News Herald, printing daily except Sunday by Bay County Publishers. Later this was revised to daily except Saturday. In 1952, the papers split into The News, publishing seven days a week, and The Herald, publishing daily except Saturday. In 1970 The News Herald reunited as a seven-day a week daily under Freedom Newspapers.

The News Herald was owned by Freedom Communications until 2012, when Freedom sold its Florida and North Carolina papers to Halifax Media Group. In 2015, Halifax was acquired by New Media Investment Group.

The publication was awarded the 1962 Pulitzer Prize for Public Service "for its three-year campaign against entrenched power and corruption, with resultant reforms in Panama City and Bay County."
