= The Record (Stockton, California) =

Newspaper in Stockton, California

- The July 27, 2005 front page of The Record.
- Type: Daily newspaper
- Format: Broadsheet
- Owner: USA Today Co.
- Founder: Irving Martin
- Editor: Sheyanne Romero
- Founded: 1895
- Language: English
- Headquarters: 445 W. Weber Ave., Suite 226; Stockton, CA 95202; United States
- Circulation: 14,500 Daily; 23,200 Sunday
- ISSN: 2996-8720 (print); 2996-8739 (web)
- OCLC number: 30442989
- Website: recordnet.com

The Record is a daily newspaper based in Stockton, California, serving San Joaquin and Calaveras Counties. It is owned by USA Today Co.

== History ==
The Record was first published by Irving Martin on April 7, 1895. Martin died in 1952 and was succeeded by his grandson Irving L. Martin and Ross Williams. In 1966, Williams died. That same year, the paper's founder was posthumously inducted into the California Newspaper Hall of Fame. In 1967, I.L. Martin died.

Speidel Newspapers, Inc. bought the newspaper from the Martin family in 1969. The company merged with the Gannett Company in 1977, and sold The Record to the Omaha World-Herald Company in 1994. Ottaway Community Newspapers bought The Record for $144 million in 2003.

The company's name was later changed to Dow Jones Local Media Group, and was sold by News Corp in 2013 to Fortress Investment Group for $87 million. The newspapers were managed by GateHouse Media, which soon after the sale filed prepackaged Chapter 11 bankruptcy to restructure its debt obligations in order to accommodate the acquisition.

In October 2018, The Record closed its press facility. In 2019, GateHouse merged with Gannett. In March 2022, The Record moved to a six day printing schedule, eliminating its printed Saturday edition. In March 2024, The Record announced it will switch from carrier to postal delivery.
