= Speidel Newspapers =

American newspaper publisher

Speidel Newspapers, Inc.
- Type: Private
- Industry: Newspapers
- Founded: 1921
- Founder: Merritt C. Speidel
- Defunct: 1976
- Key people: John Ben Snow
- Owner: Gannet

Speidel Newspapers, Inc. was an American newspaper publisher with properties in the west and midwestern United States. It originated in 1921 when Merritt C. Speidel acquired the Iowa City Press-Citizen. With major contributions from John Ben Snow, the chain grew to thirteen daily papers across nine states by the time it was acquired by and merged into Gannet in 1976.

== History ==
=== Origins ===
Merritt C. Speidel was born on May 19, 1879, in Port Jervis, New York. At age 13, he began his newspaper carrier as a paperboy for local newspapers. In high school, he published the Union School Journal, and while still in his teens, joined the staff of Tri-States Publishing Co., publisher of the Port Jervis Daily Union, the Tri-State Union and the New York Farmer. Speidel started as a reported and worked his way up to Daily Union editor. During this time in 1906, he met John Ben Snow, who operated a local Woolworth store.

In December 1909, Speidel and D.F. Cocke purchased a controlling interest in the Piqua Daily Call in Ohio. In November 1919, the Call merged with Piqua Daily Press-Dispatch. While Speidel retained an ownership stake, he was no longer involved in day-to-day management. In February 1921, Speidel acquired the Iowa City Press-Citizen. Snow eventually joined him at the business and held him to expand it. In March 1930, a fire destroyed his Iowa City printing plant, causing an estimated $110,oo in damage.

Speidel acquired the Chillicothe Scioto Gazette in January 1935, Salinas Index-Journal and the Salinas Daily Post in March 1936, and the Fort Collins Express-Courier in October 1936. Articles of incorporation were filed in August 1937 for Speidel Newspapers, Inc., with capital stock of $100,000. At that time, Speidel and his family moved to Palo Alto, California.

=== Growth ===
Speidel Newspapers acquired co-ownership of the Wyoming Tribune in May 1938, Chillicothe News-Advertiser in November 1938, the Reno Evening Gazette in 1939, followed by the Nevada State Journal a month later. At this time Snow began sole devoting his time developing the news group. In 1941, the Poughkeepsie Evening Star and Enterprise and the Poughkeepsie Morning Eagle-News were acquired, which subsequently became the Poughkeepsie New Yorker. In 1942, the two Salinas papers were merged to form The Salinas Californian. In 1943, Speidel acquired Western Horseman magazine. In 1948, the Visalia Times-Delta became the company's 7th newspaper. In 1949, the company's half-stake in the Wyoming Tribune was sold.

In June 1952, John Ben Snow, who was chairman of the board of directors, reorganized the company to place voting control with about 50 operating executives. To do this, Snow exchanged his majority voting stock for non-voting preferred stock. In April 1956, Snow sold his 43,560 stock shares back to the company for $4,356,000, which was then retired. Thus, control of the company was vested in 218 employee stockholders. At that time Snow and Speidel resigned from the board of directors. That November, Speidel retired as company president, and Harry S. Bunker was elected to succeed him.

In 1960, Speidel died at age 80. The company acquired the Argus Leader in 1963, the Fremont Tribune in 1966, and the Stockton Record in 1969. Speidel Newspapers filed for Initial public offering in 1972 and opened up sale of company stock to the public. In 1973, Snow died at age 89. and was remembered at a company co-founder. In 1974, Speidel Newspapers took steps to block a possible takeover by Canadian publisher Thomson Newspapers, which owned 6.7% of stock. Shareholders voted to block any foreign entity from owning more than 10% of stock. In 1975, the St. Cloud Times and Live Falls Transcript were purchased.

=== Sale ===
In 1976, Speidel Newspapers was acquired by Gannett for $173 million and then merged into the company. At that time the company operated thirteen daily papers across nine states, including:

- Iowa City Press-Citizen
- Poughkeepsie New Yorker
- Chillicothe Gazette
- Evening Gazette and Evening State Journal
- Fort Collins Coloradoan
- Salinas Daily Californian
- Visalia Times-Delta
- St. Cloud Times
- Argus Leader
- Record
- Fremont Tribune
