= Spartanburg Herald-Journal =

Daily newspaper in South Carolina, US

- The August 2, 2007, cover of the Herald-Journal
- Type: Daily newspaper
- Owner: USA Today Co.
- Founded: 1843
- Headquarters: Spartanburg, South Carolina
- Circulation: 13,739 (as of 2018)
- ISSN: 0740-4743
- OCLC number: 9951368
- Website: goupstate.com

The Spartanburg Herald-Journal is a daily newspaper, the primary newspaper for Spartanburg, South Carolina, United States.

== History ==
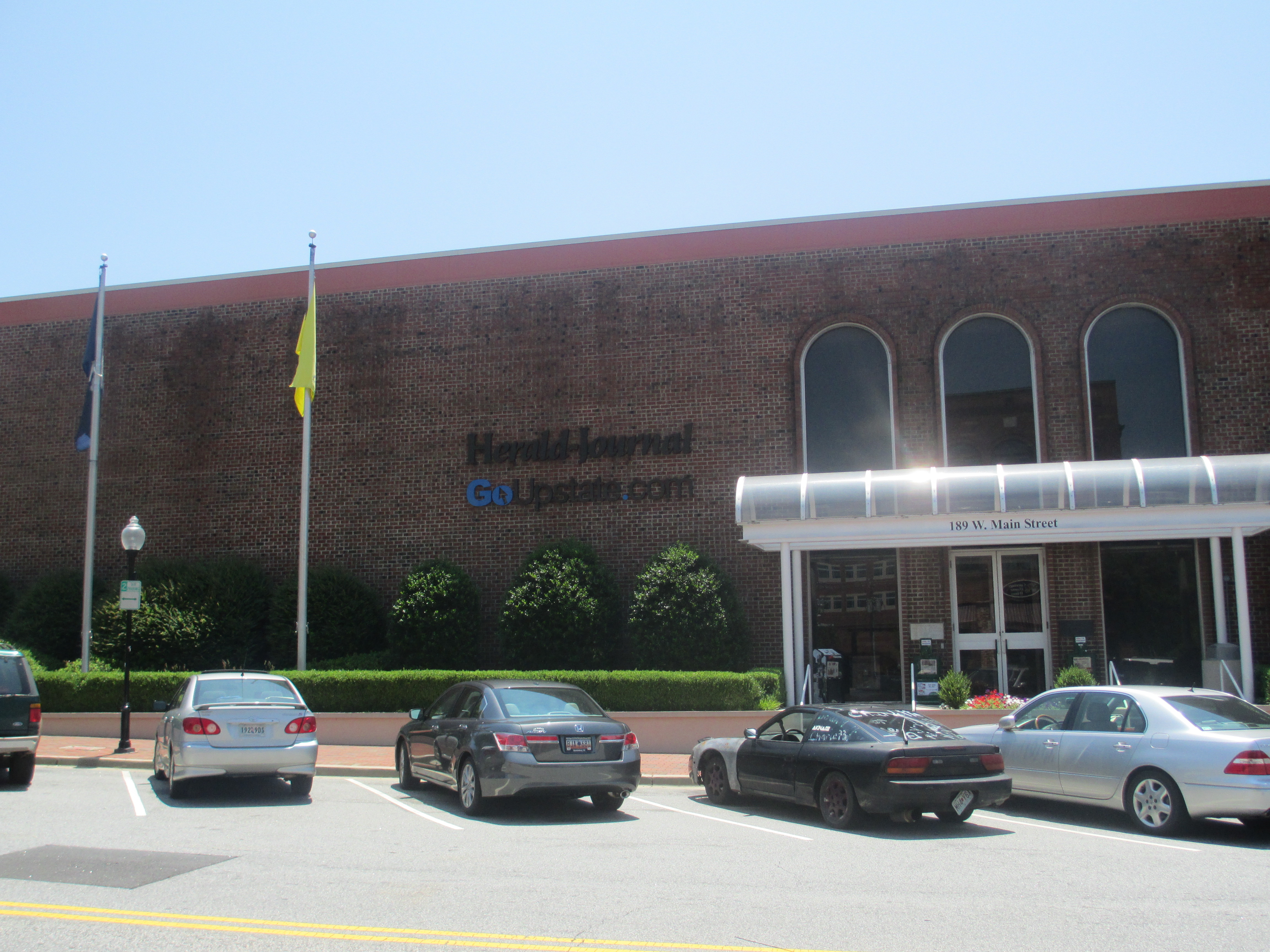
Herald-Journal office in downtown Spartanburg

The origins of the paper lie with The Spartan, a weekly paper reportedly first printed in about 1842–43. In 1844, this was renamed The Carolina Spartan. In about 1900, the paper was reportedly bought by The Journal Publishing Company, which renamed it The Spartanburg Journal.

In 1872 (or perhaps 1875), The Spartanburg Herald began publishing. It began daily publication in 1890; the Journal followed suit in 1903.

The Herald purchased the Journal in 1914. The Herald was a morning paper, while the Journal covered evenings, with joint editions published on the weekend. Though under common ownership, the Herald and Journal did not completely merge into one paper until October 1982.

In 1929, owner The Herald-Journal Publishing Company sold the papers to its paper distributor, the International Paper and Power Company, who sold them to A. G. Keeney in 1936, who in turn sold to S. S. "Blue" Wallace in 1939. Charles Edward Marsh brought the papers in 1946, and donated them to the non-profit Public Welfare Foundation he had created in 1947.

A 1969 federal tax law requiring non-profits to sell newspaper holdings eventually required the sale of the paper. The New York Times acquired the Herald-Journal from the Public Welfare Foundation in 1985 (along with The Tuscaloosa News and The Gadsden Times), at which time its daily circulation was 47,500, and Sunday 51,000.

On January 6, 2012, Halifax Media Group completed its purchase of the Herald-Journal and 15 other newspapers from The New York Times. In 2015, Halifax was acquired by New Media Investment Group.
