= St. Cloud Times =

Newspaper in St. Cloud, Minnesota

Coordinates: 45.559411°N 94.160761°W

- Type: Daily newspaper
- Owner: USA Today Co.
- Founded: 1861; 165 years ago
- Language: American English
- Headquarters: 24 Eighth Ave. S, St. Cloud 56301
- City: St. Cloud
- Country: United States
- Circulation: 7,092 (as of 2024)
- Readership: Central Minnesota
- ISSN: 0899-5028
- OCLC number: 18126925
- Website: sctimes.com

St. Cloud Times is an American, English language daily newspaper headquartered in St. Cloud, Minnesota. The Times is owned by mass media holding company USA Today Co. and is part of the USA Today network of newspapers. The print version of the paper is printed by ECM Publishers in Princeton, Minnesota.

== History ==
The St. Cloud Times and Journal Press was created in 1929 through the merger of several local newspapers, including the St. Cloud Union, The Visitor, St. Cloud Democrat, St. Cloud Journal-Press, and German Language Der Nordstern. The paper was renamed to the St. Cloud Daily Times in 1941, becoming a six-day a week afternoon paper owned by Fred Schilplin. The newspaper was purchased by Speidel Newspapers in 1975, which in turn was purchased by Gannett, the largest newspaper holding company in the United States, in 1977. The Times added a Sunday edition in 1988.

The St. Cloud Journal-Press had previously been known as the "St. Cloud Journal"

St. Cloud was also home to the Minnesota Union newspaper, founded by Sylvanus Lowry, a slave owner from Kentucky, Democratic political boss, and the city's first council president (the office of mayor did not exist) to compete with Radical Republican Jane Swisshelm's Saint Cloud Visiter and to provide a pro-slavery viewpoint. Lowry lived in St. Cloud in 1854 until his death in 1865. Swisshelm left St. Cloud when the Civil War broke out in 1861.

In a May 2010 report by Minnesota Public Radio, St. Cloud State University professor Christopher Lehman claimed that "Lowry founded a pro-slavery newspaper, The Union, which later became the St. Cloud Times." The Minnesota State Historical Society does not reference any holdings for the Lowry paper. The St. Cloud Times history of multiple changes of ownership does not include the Lowry "The Union" paper among the five local publications that merged over time. "With a population of just over two thousand in 1870, St. Cloud, Minnesota, was a bustling thoroughfare, but not large enough to support the multiple newspapers published in the city."

== Legacy of national and state awards ==
"In its prime, the paper had 40 to 50 people in its newsroom covering three counties and beyond, regularly winning state and even national journalism awards."

In the 32 years between 1985-2017, the St. Cloud Times was named the Minnesota Newspaper Association's daily newspaper of the year 25 times. That honor - the Vance Trophy - is determined by news professionals from outside Minnesota, with new judges each year. The Vance Trophy was won in succession under top editors Don Casey, Susan Ihne, John Bodette and Lisa Schwarz.

In 2017, the Times won the national Sigma Delta Chi/Society of Professional Journalists award for Breaking News for its coverage of the confession of the murderer of Jacob Wetterling, a 12-year-old St. Joseph, Minn., boy who was abducted at gunpoint in 1989. Team: Kirsti Marohn, David Unze, Stephanie Dickrell, Jenny Berg, David Schwarz and Jason Wachter (photographers). Led by editor Lisa Schwarz.

In 2012, the Times won the Society of American Business Editors and Writers (SABEW) Best in Business - Innovation Award for a multimedia reporting project about the impact of the Bakken oil boom on Central Minnesota, almost two states away. Judges comments on "Chasing Futures in the Oil Patch" were: "The paper was able to show readers a direct relationship from the boom in North Dakota to St. Cloud’s economy. The package showed an extraordinary investment of time, thought and space by the paper to the story, although St. Cloud has limited resources." The project also won first place for in-depth reporting from the Minnesota Society of Professional Journalists. Team: Kevin Allenspach, Kimm Anderson (photographer), Lisa Sabyan (graphic artist). Led by editor Lisa Schwarz.

In 2010, the Times won the national Sigma Delta Chi/Society of Professional Journalists award for Investigative Reporting for an 18-month project exploring the public, economic and personal costs of dozens of failed housing developments in the Great Recession. Team: Kirsti Marohn, Britt Johnson, Lisa Sabyan (graphic artist). Led by editor Lisa Schwarz.

In 2007, the Times won the national Knight-Batten Award for Innovations in Journalism: Multimedia for Downtown After Dark, a multimedia reporting project that showed a college community what its bar district looked like after everyone but the students, hospitality workers and law enforcement was in bed. Team: Kari Petrie, Dave Schwarz (photographer). Led by editor Lisa Schwarz.

In 2004, the Times embedded reporter Michelle Tan and photographer Dave Schwarz with the 367th Infantry assigned to Bagram, Afghanistan for three weeks. In addition to daily reports, the Times produced a book from their reporting. Led by editor Rene Kaluza.

== Decline and Downsizing ==
The Times had daily circulation of more than 30,000, nearing 40,000 on Sundays, as recently as the mid-2000s and employed more than 40 people in the newsroom and more than 250 on site in its printing, advertising and business operations.

The presses were retired in 2009 due to proximity of a larger company-owned printing operation in the Minneapolis-St. Paul metro area.

In 2018, the building at 3000 7th Ave. North was sold, along with other Gannett real estate nationwide, to Twenty Lake Holding, a subsidiary of Alden Global Capital. The Times relocated its then-35 total employees to a custom-remodeled, leased property at 24 Eighth Avenue South in downtown St. Cloud on April 1, 2019.

Following its 2018 purchase by Gatehouse Media, parent company Gannett eliminated more than half (12,000+) of its newsroom jobs nationwide between 2019 and 2022, cuts substantially deeper than the rate of newspaper revenue decline. The downsizing is blamed in part on millions of dollars in debt payments related to the Gatehouse/Gannett deal.

The Times' editor resigned in July 2022, leaving a news staff of nine behind. After layoffs in August 2022, voluntary buyouts in December 2022 and resignations, a single reporter remained by December 2022 to cover Minnesota's fifth largest metropolitan area, with a population of 200,000. Industry observers referred to the shell publication as a 'ghost paper'.

Axios (website) asked Gannett in December 2022 how the bare-bones St. Cloud staff could keep producing a daily paper. The email response: "While incredibly difficult, implementing these efficiencies and responding decisively to the ongoing macroeconomic volatility will continue to propel Gannett's future."

The last remaining news reporter at the paper resigned in January 2023 to join St. Cloud Live, a new, free online publication produced by The Forum Communications Company, headquartered in Fargo North Dakota, 155 miles northwest of St. Cloud by Interstate 94. (A sports reporter was hired later in 2023 as the Times' next sole news staffer.)

Forum Chief Content Office Mary Jo Hotzler said: "St. Cloud, from a geographical standpoint, makes sense. But more than that, we are deeply committed to local journalism and see a need in St. Cloud."

In 2022, Gannett ended newspaper delivery of the Times, distributing the paper through the U.S. Mail instead, eliminating a separate Saturday edition and delivering the Sunday paper on Saturday instead.

== Online Digital ==
The newspaper's website, sctimes.com, was established in 1998., and refers to the publication as the "SC Times". The publication offers readers a 'digital only' option.
