= Northwest Florida Daily News =

Daily newspaper in Fort Walton Beach

NorthWest Florida Daily News
- Type: Daily newspaper
- Owner: USA Today Co.
- Founded: 1946
- Headquarters: Fort Walton Beach, Florida United States
- Circulation: 10,664
- Website: nwfdailynews.com

The Northwest Florida Daily News is a daily newspaper published in Fort Walton Beach, Florida. It was founded in 1946 and is owned by USA Today Co.

== History ==
A group of local businessmen met on January 9, 1946, to organize a weekly newspaper for Okaloosa County's southern region. The Okaloosa News-Journal, published at the county seat of Crestview at the northern end of the county for many decades, carried early accounts of the developing region. As the southern communities of Cinco Bayou, Destin, Fort Walton, Mary Esther, Niceville, Ocean City, Shalimar, Valparaiso, and Wright expanded, so did the need for local coverage. The civic leaders gathered at a downtown Fort Walton bar, which had the only available meeting room. Present were Andy Anderson, Braden Ball, Leon Bishop, Frank Bizelle, Lee Courter, W.R. Cummings, L. Ferrin, Bill Folb, Ray Folmar, Howard Gill, George Klosterman, DeWitt Lamb (the first editor), Fred McCaully, Clyde Meigs, R.L. Odom, Paul Roberts, Bill Williams, and Toopey Work.

Perry Publications, a group of about 30 papers, began publication of the Playground News on February 7, 1946. The first issue contained 24 pages, about 65 percent of which was paid display advertising. From the mid-1960s, the newspaper's offices and printing plant were on Eglin Parkway in downtown Fort Walton Beach. The paper was sold to Freedom Newspapers, Inc., now Freedom Communications, on July 1, 1969. On August 22, 1975, the newspaper printed the edition for the first time at a new plant and offices at 200 N.W. Racetrack Road in Fort Walton Beach, which would remain the base of operations through the fall of 2011.

In 2012, Freedom sold its Florida and North Carolina papers to Halifax Media Group. In 2015, Halifax was acquired by New Media Investment Group.

Over its history, the paper has gone by three names:

- Playground News February 7, 1946 - September 2, 1962
- Playground Daily News September 3, 1962 - February 29, 1988
- Northwest Florida Daily News March 1, 1988–present

Due to the close ties between the Fort Walton Beach community and Eglin Air Force Base, the Playground/Northwest Florida News eventually supplanted the Okaloosa News-Journal as the county paper of record.

Hunter S. Thompson wrote a sports column for the Northwest Florida Daily News (then called the Playground News) while stationed at Eglin Air Force Base. Thompson landed the job in early February 1957. Hired by Publisher Wayne Bell, Thompson wrote under the pseudonyms Thorne Stockton and Cubley Cohn.

== Subsidiaries ==
Subsidiaries include the Eglin Dispatch and the Hurlburt Warrior.
