= Community Newspapers =

Community Newspapers may refer to:

- Community paper, concept of community papers
- Community Newspapers (Wisconsin), an American newspaper group owned by Journal Communications
- Community Newspaper Group, Australia
- Community Newspapers, Inc., of Athens, Georgia, U.S., publisher of newspapers in North Carolina, Georgia, and Florida
- Community Newspaper Company, Massachusetts, U.S.
- Community Newspaper Holdings, Inc., U.S.
