= Daily Commercial =

Daily newspaper in Leesburg, Florida

- Type: Daily newspaper
- Format: Berliner
- Owner: USA Today Co.
- News editor: Jim Ross
- Founded: 1875
- Headquarters: 212 East Main Street; Leesburg, Florida 34749; US
- Circulation: 7,511
- Website: dailycommercial.com

The Daily Commercial is a daily newspaper distributed in Lake and Sumter counties, Florida.

== History ==
The Daily Commercial was founded in 1875. It was later acquired by members of the Cowles family in 1969. The New York Times Company acquired the paper in 1971 and sold it in 1995 to Better Built. HarborPoint Media acquired the Better Built papers in 2004, and owned the Daily Commercial until 2013, when it was acquired by Halifax Media Group. In 2015, Halifax was acquired by New Media Investment Group.
