= The Star (Florida) =

Weekly newspaper in Port St. Joe, Florida, United States

The Star logo

The Star is a weekly newspaper headquartered in Apalachicola, Florida. Previously the headquarters were in Port St. Joe.

It was owned by Freedom Communications until 2012, when Freedom's Florida and North Carolina papers were sold to Halifax Media.
