= News Chief =

Daily newspaper in Winter Haven, Florida

- Type: Daily newspaper
- Format: Broadsheet
- Owner: USA Today Co.
- Publisher: T. Brian Burns
- Editor: Bob Heist
- Founded: 1911
- Headquarters: 455 Sixth St. N.W. Winter Haven, Florida, 33881; United States
- ISSN: 1085-9101
- Website: newschief.com

The News Chief is a daily paper located in Winter Haven, Florida that serves east Polk County, Florida. It is owned by USA Today Co. and is located at 455 Sixth St. N.W.

== History ==
The News Chief traces its beginnings to September 28, 1911, when the first edition of the weekly Florida Chief was published by its founder, M.M. "Dad" Lee.

Everything originally was handset, but, within four years, Lee had moved the newspaper to larger quarters and eventually acquired three linotype machines. During its 10th anniversary in September 1921, the newspaper went to twice-a-week publication, and three years later went to five days a week, Monday through Friday.

Lee continued the newspaper through two severe hurricanes (1926 and 1933), a fire (1930) and the Great Depression before selling the newspaper in January 1948 to W.W. Galvin of Ohio.

Galvin immediately acquired a weekly, The Winter Haven News, and combined it with the Florida Chief into the News Chief.

The newspaper eventually passed to the W.E. "Bill" Rynerson family, which later acquired the weekly Auburndale Star.

Disaster struck on Nov. 13, 1954, when a major fire destroyed the News Chief's downtown Winter Haven building and severely damaged most of the equipment.

A four-page Sunday edition was printed at The Winter Haven Herald to keep intact the record of not missing a scheduled publication day.

In March 1964, the News Chief became one of the early leaders in Florida journalism in converting to offset printing.

In December 1972, the News Chief moved from its downtown plant to new quarters.

The News Chief added to its holdings with the purchase of the Winter Haven Shopping Guide in 1978.

In 1979, the Rynerson family sold the News Chief to Multimedia Inc.

In 1990, the News Chief was sold to Stauffer Communications.

In 1995, the News Chief and its other holdings became part of Morris Communications Co. with the Morris purchase of the Stauffer Communications chain of publications.

In 2007, the News Chief and its other holdings, including the Polk Shopper, became part of GateHouse Media Inc.

In March 2008, GateHouse sold the News Chief's newspaper operations to The New York Times Company and its Lakeland newspaper, The Ledger.

On January 6, 2012, Halifax Media Group became the new owner of the News Chief. In 2015, Halifax was acquired by New Media Investment Group, owner of the GateHouse chain.
