= CNI College =

Career Networks Institute
- Type: private
- Established: 1994
- President: Jim Buffington
- Head: Jim Buffington
- Other students: For profit education
- Location: Santa Ana, California, United States; 33.77°N 117.86°W
- Website: http://cnicollege.edu/

CNI College (also Career Networks Institute) is an allied health vocational college in Santa Ana, California. The main campus is located in the City of Orange.

== History ==
CNI College was established in 1994, and was located in Santa Ana. The vocational college was moved to the City of Orange campus in 1997. The college eventually expanded to the Costa Mesa campus to accommodate growth, but in 2009 the main campus moved back to the City of Orange. Here, all classrooms and administrative office are in one location.

== Academics ==
The college offers an Associate Degree in Nursing, a vocational nursing course, qualifications in massage therapy, MRI technology, personal fitness training, pharmacy technician and surgical technologist programs.

=== Accreditations ===
CNI College has been accredited by the Accrediting Bureau of Health Education Schools, American Society of Health System Pharmacists, and Commissions on Accreditation of Allied Health Education Programs. CNI College has received approval from the Bureau for Private Postsecondary Education, American Registry of Magnetic Resonance Imaging Technologists, State of California Board of Vocational Nursing and Psychiatric Technicians, California State Approving Agency for Veterans Education, State of California Board of Registered Nurses, and received a Certificate of Recognition from the National Strength & Conditioning Association.

=== Memberships ===
In addition to CNI College's accreditations and approvals, CNI is a member of the following organizations: California Association of Private Postsecondary Schools (CAPPS), Association of Surgical Technologists (AST), Accreditation Review Council on Education in Surgical Technology and Surgical Assisting (ARC/STSA), Better Business Bureau, American Massage Therapy Association (AMTA), and Library and Information Resources Network, Inc.
