= T Brand Studio =

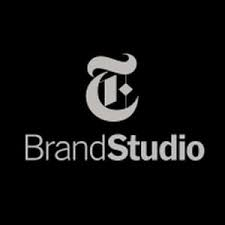
- Company type: Studio
- Industry: Advertising
- Founded: 2014
- Headquarters: New York, New York, United States
- Key people: Adam Aston, Editorial Director; Nicole Marie Rincon, Design Director
- Products: Paid posts in The New York Times
- Parent: The New York Times
- Website: www.tbrandstudio.com

T Brand Studio is a custom content studio that is a unit of The New York Times and produces paid native advertising for the newspaper. Notable campaigns have included a feature called "Woman Inmates: Why The Male Model Doesn't Work" to promote the Netflix program Orange Is The New Black, and a feature on the New York City Ballet for footwear company Cole Haan entitled "Grit and Grace".

== History ==
T Brand Studio was founded in early 2014. In 2015, the studio opened an office in London, with plans to use that office for expansion into the rest of the world, including Asia.

In March 2016, The New York Times bought Santa Monica, California-based Pinterest marketing company HelloSociety for an undisclosed amount, and it was announced that the company would be integrated with T Brand Studio.

In June 2017, T Brand Studio opened its Asian branch in Hong Kong.

== Operations ==
The studio staff consists of journalists, video producers, technologists, strategists and social media experts. As of October 2015, the group had developed over 100 campaigns for more than 50 different brands. It was reported that almost 20% of The New York Times' digital advertising revenue came from T Brand Studio projects. That was estimated to be $35.7 million in 2014.
