= Scroll (web service) =

Web service by Scroll Labs Inc, 2020–2021

- Original author(s): Tony Haile
- Developer(s): Scroll Labs Inc. (Twitter, Inc.)
- Initial release: January 28, 2020; 5 years ago
- Platform: Web browser, Mobile app
- Type: Ad-free internet browsing
- License: Subscription service
- Website: scroll.com

Scroll was a subscription-based web service developed by Scroll Labs Inc., offering ad-free access to websites in exchange for a fee. Scroll was not an ad blocker; instead, it partnered directly with internet publishers who voluntarily removed ads from their sites for Scroll users in exchange for a portion of the subscription fee.

In May 2021, Scroll was acquired by Twitter. In October 2021, Scroll sent out an email announcing its integration into Twitter Blue within 30 days.

== Functionality ==
Scroll enabled users to browse websites that partnered with Scroll without encountering online advertising, in exchange for a subscription fee. Unlike ad blocker, which disable advertisements without compensating the publisher, Scroll sent a browser cookie indicating that the user was a subscriber. The Scroll software integrated into the website detected this cookie and served an ad-free version of the site. In exchange for disabling advertisements, partner websites received a portion of the subscription fee. As of January 2020, Scroll retained 30% of the subscription fee, with the remaining 70% distributed among publisher sites. Payments to sites were made individually by users based on their 'engagement and loyalty,' rather than from a single pool of all subscription revenue. Scroll did not grant subscribers access to partner sites behind a paywall; it only removed ads from the site if the user also paid the publication's subscription fee.

== History ==
Scroll was founded in 2016 by former Chartbeat Chief Executive Tony Haile. Scroll raised US$3 million in its first round of funding in 2016, including investments from The New York Times, Uncork Capital, and Axel Springer SE. By October 2018, Scroll had raised US$10 million in funding. In 2018, Scroll signed its first partner websites, which included The Atlantic, Fusion Media Group, Business Insider, Slate, MSNBC, The Philadelphia Inquirer, and Talking Points Memo. In February 2019, Scroll acquired the social media curation app Nuzzel. The same month, Mozilla and Scroll announced a partnership to run a "test pilot" together, but did not go into details. Scroll entered beta testing in 2019 and launched to the general public on January 28, 2020.

In March 2020, Mozilla started offering Scroll as part of its "Firefox Better Web" service bundle.

In May 2021, Scroll was acquired by Twitter, with the future of Scroll cited as being uncertain. An email to customers announcing the change said, "Later this year, Scroll will become part of a wider Twitter subscription that will expand on and adapt our services and functionality".
