= The Shelby Star =

Newspaper in Shelby, North Carolina

- Type: Daily newspaper
- Format: Broadsheet
- Owner: USA Today Co.
- Publisher: Lucy Talley
- Editor: Diane Turbyfill
- Founded: 1894
- Language: American English
- Headquarters: 315 E Graham St. Shelby, North Carolina, United States
- Circulation: 4,378 (as of 2018)
- ISSN: 1043-1950
- OCLC number: 38892599
- Website: shelbystar.com

The Shelby Star is daily newspaper based in Shelby, North Carolina. It primarily serves Cleveland County and the surrounding areas.

== History ==
The newspaper has ties back to August 1894 when Clyde Hoey purchased the Shelby Review and changed the name to The Cleveland Star. In 1936, the name was changed to The Shelby Daily Star. The name was changed to The Shelby Star in 1984 and The Star in 1988.

The newspaper was owned by Freedom Communications until 2012, when the company sold its Florida and North Carolina papers to Halifax Media Group. Then, in 2015, Halifax was acquired by New Media Investment Group.

== See also ==
- List of newspapers in North Carolina
