= The Dispatch (Lexington) =

Newspaper in Lexington, North Carolina, US

- Front page of The Dispatch (February 28, 2012)
- Type: Daily newspaper (Tue. thru Sat.)
- Owner: Paxton Media Group
- Publisher: H.B. Varner, Paul Mauney
- Editor: Scott Jenkins
- Founded: 1902
- Language: American English
- Headquarters: 30 E. 1st Avenue; Lexington, NC 27292
- City: Lexington, North Carolina
- Country: United States of America
- Circulation: 4,032 (as of 2018)
- ISSN: 0163-3090
- OCLC number: 650333698
- Website: the-dispatch.com

The Dispatch is an American, English language daily newspaper published in Lexington, North Carolina. The newspaper is published Tuesday through Saturday with no Sunday or Monday editions.

== History ==
The Dispatch began publication in 1902, succeeding the weekly Davidson Dispatch (1882–1902), founded by T.B. Eldridge. The paper increased to semi-weekly publication in 1919 and to a six-day-a-week schedule on September 6, 1948. On September 1, 2008, the publication eliminated its Monday edition, and was published only five days.

The New York Times Company acquired The Dispatch in 1973, and the Halifax Media Group acquired it on January 6, 2012. In 2015, Halifax was acquired by New Media Investment Group.

In November 2022 Paxton Media Group acquired The Dispatch and five other North Carolina newspapers from Gannett Co., Inc.

Estimated average circulation of The Dispatch in 2013 was 6,892.

The Dispatch is a member of the North Carolina Press Association.

== See also ==
- List of newspapers in North Carolina
