= Community Newspapers (Wisconsin) =

U.S. newspaper group owned by Gannett

Community Newspapers Incorporated
- Company type: Subsidiary
- Founded: 1979
- Headquarters: New Berlin, Wisconsin, USA, United States
- Area served: Milwaukee metropolitan area
- Services: newspaper publishing
- Number of employees: approximately 110
- Parent: Gannett
- Website: www.cninewsonline.com

Community Newspapers Inc. (CNI) is a subsidiary of Gannett. Based in New Berlin, Wisconsin, it publishes eight weekly newspapers in the Milwaukee metropolitan area. CNI has about 110 full-time employees and about 30 part-time employees.

== History ==
Publisher Duane Dunham began the Oak Creek Pictorial in 1956. By 1964 he had added the Greenfield Observer, Greendale Village Life, and the Hub in Hales Corners to his growing publishing empire. Three years later Community Newspapers, Inc bought the competing Tri-Town News which served Hales Corners, Muskego and Franklin. CNI expanded into the North Shore suburbs in 1974 when it bought the five Herald weekly newspapers from North Shore Publishing. These papers were the Glendale, Brown Deer, Shorewood, Whitefish Bay, and Fox Point/Bayside/River Hills Heralds. The largest addition was the 1979 purchase of 11 newspapers published by Shinner Publications including the Hartford, Menomonee Falls, Germantown, Elm Grove, Brookfield, New Berlin, and Wauwatosa papers. Finally, in 1983, the West Allis Star was added to the roster of suburban papers. By 1986, when Duane Dunham retired, CNI had a total of 23 community newspapers. Upon his retirement, the chain was sold to Sun Media corp of Cleveland, Ohio. It remained a major competitor of print journalism in the Milwaukee Metropolitan market until it was purchased by Journal Communications in 1997. By 2006, the suburban editions were consolidated into only 11 editions, losing the original newspaper names.

The list of the 23 weekly newspapers at their 1986 peak was as follows:

- The Bay Viewer
- Brookfield News
- Brown Deer Herald
- Cudahy Reminder-Enterprise
- Elm Grove Elm Leaves
- Fox Point, Bayside, River Hills Herald
- Franklin-Hales Corners Hub
- Germantown Banner-Press
- Glendale Herald
- Greendale Village Life
- Greenfield Observer
- Muskego Sun
- Mequon-Thiensville Courant
- Menomonee Falls News
- New Berlin Citizen
- Oak Creek Pictorial
- St Francis Reminder-Enterprise
- Shorewood Herald
- South Milwaukee Voice Graphic
- Sussex-Lannon-Lisbon News
- Wauwatosa News-Times
- West Allis Star
- Whitefish Bay Herald

Most of the CNI newspapers had long histories and have traded owners several times in their history. The Wauwatosa News-Times (now Wauwatosa NOW) dates back to March 1899, the West Allis Star (now Greenfield-West Allis NOW) was first published on December 14, 1916, and the Whitefish Bay Herald (now North Shore NOW) first issue was released on June 12, 1930.

== Newspapers ==
- Brookfield-Elm Grove NOW
- Germantown-Menomonee Falls NOW
- Greenfield-West Allis NOW
- Muskego-New Berlin NOW
- North Shore NOW (weekly newspaper renamed from the North Shore Herald in 2007)
- Oak Creek-Franklin-Greendale-Hales Corners NOW
- South Shore NOW
- Wauwatosa NOW
- Whitefish Bay NOW
