= HelloSociety =

- Industry: Marketing Communications
- Number of locations: Santa Monica, CA, United States
- Area served: Worldwide
- Key people: Kyla Brennan (CEO / Founder)
- Parent: The New York Times Company
- Website: www.hellosociety.com

HelloSociety was a Santa Monica, CA-based social media marketing and technology firm that helped brands partner with influencers. The company was founded by Kyla Brennan in 2012.

The company was purchased by The New York Times Company in March 2016.

== History ==
HelloSociety started out as HelloInsights, an analytics and ad measurement tool, and expanded to a full suite. The company was the first Pinterest marketing and analytics firm. In 2015, the company expanded its network to include influencers on Instagram, Snapchat, YouTube, and other social media platforms.

In March 2016, the New York Times Company bought HelloSociety for an undisclosed amount, and it was announced that the company would be integrated with the Times' internal social media agency, T Brand Studio.

== Products ==
HelloSociety’s product suite was made up of five parts: HelloInsights, HelloPartners, HelloBuzz, HelloCreative, and HelloManager.
