= The Gaston Gazette =

North Carolina-based newspaper

- The May 5, 2008, front page of The Gaston Gazette
- Type: Daily newspaper
- Format: Broadsheet
- Owner: USA Today Co.
- Publisher: Lucy Talley
- Editor: N/A
- Founded: 1880
- Language: American English
- Headquarters: 1893 Remount Rd. Gastonia, North Carolina 28054 United States
- Circulation: 9,883 (as of 2018)
- OCLC number: 27041214
- Website: gastongazette.com

The Gaston Gazette is a daily newspaper based in Gastonia, North Carolina. The newspaper was owned by Freedom Communications until 2012, when Freedom sold its Florida and North Carolina papers to Halifax Media Group. In 2015, Halifax was acquired by New Media Investment Group, which was merged and became Gannett in 2019.

== Overview ==
The Gazette primarily serves Gastonia and Gaston County and the surrounding counties of Lincoln County in North Carolina and York County in South Carolina.

The Gazette partners with WSOC-TV (Channel 9, an ABC affiliate) in nearby Charlotte.

The Gaston Gazette is a member of the North Carolina Press Association.

The Gaston Gazette has a Facebook page for sharing news and interacting with readers.

In December 2023, the paper announced it will be switching from carrier to mail delivery via the U.S. Postal Service.

== History ==
The Gaston Gazette was founded in 1880. The newspaper has had several names:

- The Gaston Gazette. (Gastonia, N.C.) since 1989
- The Gastonia Gazette. (Gastonia, N.C.) 1947–1989
- Gastonia Daily Gazette. (Gastonia, N.C.) 1919–1947
- The Daily Gazette. (Gastonia, N.C.) 1919–1919
- The Gastonia Gazette. (Gastonia, Gaston Co., N.C.) 1880–1919

== See also ==
- List of newspapers in North Carolina
