= Reno Gazette-Journal =

Daily newspaper in Nevada, US

Reno Gazette Journal
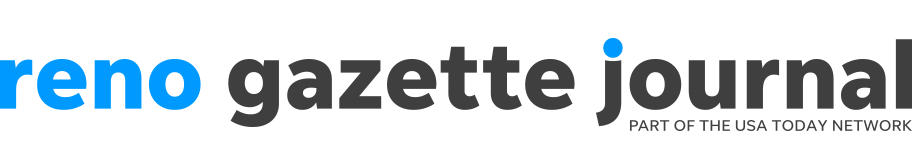

- The front page of the Reno Gazette-Journal on July 27, 2005
- Type: Daily newspaper
- Format: Broadsheet
- Owner: USA Today Co.
- Editor: Peggy Santoro
- Founded: Nevada State Journal: November 23, 1870; 155 years ago Reno Evening Gazette: March 28, 1876; 150 years ago Reno Gazette-Journal: October 7, 1983; 42 years ago
- Headquarters: 80 W First St, Reno NV 89501; Reno, Nevada 89502-2000; US
- Circulation: 66,442 Daily; 82,651 Sunday (as of 2007)
- ISSN: 0745-1415
- Website: rgj.com

The Reno Gazette Journal is a daily newspaper in Reno, Nevada. It is owned and operated by USA Today Co.

== History ==
The first edition of the Nevada State Journal was published on November 23, 1870. It was a Republican paper founded by J.G. Law. The Reno Evening Gazette was founded on March 28, 1876, by Alexander & Hayden.

Speidel Newspapers bought the Gazette on October 1, 1939, and bought the Journal a month later. Gannett bought Speidel Newspapers on May 11, 1977. The two papers were combined on October 7, 1983.

On January 11, 2019, the executive editor Kelly Scott was replaced by Brian Duggin.

On April 16, 2019, an edition of the Nevada State Journal was found during the opening of a time capsule from 1872 in the cornerstone of a demolished Masonic lodge in Reno.

In March 2022, The Reno Gazette Journal moved to a six-day printing schedule, eliminating its printed Saturday edition.

On July 21, 2022, Brian Duggin stepped down after serving as the executive editor for three years. On August 18, 2022, he was succeeded by Peggy Santoro.

In May 2024, the newspaper announced it will switch from carrier to postal delivery.
