= The Daily Comet =

News outlet

Daily Comet
- Type: Daily newspaper
- Format: Broadsheet
- Owner: Gannett
- Publisher: Miles Forrest
- Editor: Keith Magill
- Founded: 1889 (as the Lafourche Comet)
- Headquarters: 104 Hickory Street; Thibodaux, Louisiana 70301
- Circulation: 3,579
- Website: dailycomet.com

The Daily Comet is a newspaper in Thibodaux, Louisiana, United States. It covers Lafourche, Assumption, the west bank of St. James and the northern part of Terrebonne parishes.

It began publishing in 1889 as the weekly Lafourche Comet. It is the only paper currently published in America named "Comet". Its publisher, a Democrat, selected the name "Comet" because the rival Republican newspaper was named the Star. The publisher reasoned that a comet is brighter than a star.

The Daily Comet was purchased by Halifax Media Group from The New York Times Company on January 6, 2012. In 2015, Halifax was acquired by New Media Investment Group.
