= Ocala StarBanner =

Daily newspaper in Ocala, Florida

- The 30 September 2006 cover of the Star-Banner
- Type: Daily newspaper
- Format: Broadsheet
- Owner: USA Today Co.
- Publisher: Rynni Henderson (2019–present)
- Editor: Douglas Ray
- Headquarters: Ocala, Florida, United States
- Circulation: 42,869
- ISSN: 0163-3201
- OCLC number: 1001642345
- Website: ocala.com

Logo in 2007

The Ocala StarBanner is the daily newspaper in Ocala, Florida, United States, and serves Marion County and the surrounding communities. The Ocala StarBanner has a daily circulation of about 43,000, and is the 19th-largest newspaper in the state of Florida.

== History ==
The East Florida Banner started publishing weekly in Marion County, Florida, in 1866, by printer-editor Francis Eppes "Frank" Harris (1846–1928). Frank was the editor and owner of the Ocala Banner until his death, being owned and operated by the family until sold during World War II. Frank Harris' grandson, Harris Powers, took over operations after his grandfather's death until he joined the war effort.

The East Florida Banner was sold to George W. Wilson in 1881 and was renamed The Florida Banner-Lacon when it merged with The Florida Lacon. In 1883, the name was changed to The Ocala Banner. In 1890, The Ocala Banner became a daily newspaper. In 1895, the Ocala Evening Star surfaced as a rival to the Ocala Banner. Beginning in 1897, it also appeared in a weekly edition, the Ocala Weekly Star. During an address to the Ocala Rotary Club, R. N. Dosh, editor of the Evening Star in the 1920s and 1930s, recalled that the "Star first saw the light of day in the press room of the Florida Baptist Witness", founded in 1884 as the weekly press organ of the Florida Baptist Convention, a branch of the Southern Baptist Convention. The Ocala Star-Banner was combined into one publication on 1 September 1943, and has remained the daily newspaper in Marion County since that time.

Situated in rural Marion County, the Ocala Banner covered farming, business, and civic issues in Ocala, where the Freeze of 1895 had devastated the citrus industry and paved the way for diversified agriculture and the growth of tourism.

Halifax Media Group acquired the paper in 2012. In 2015, Halifax was acquired by New Media Investment Group.

In March 2024, the newspaper switched from carrier to postal delivery.
