= Sun Journal (North Carolina) =

American newspaper

- Type: Daily newspaper
- Format: Broadsheet
- Owner: Paxton Media Group
- Publisher: John McClure
- Editor: Rochelle Moore
- Founded: June 1, 1876; 150 years ago
- Language: American English
- Headquarters: 4901 U.S. Hwy 17 South
- City: New Bern, North Carolina 28562
- Country: United States
- Circulation
- Website: newbernsj.com

The Sun Journal is an American, English language daily newspaper published in New Bern, North Carolina.

== History ==
The newspaper began publishing in 1916 as the Sun Journal following the merger of two older newspapers, the Sun and the Journal, in 1914. It was acquired by the New Bernian newspaper in 1923. In 1974 it was acquired by Freedom Communications, Inc. It was owned by Freedom Communications until 2012, when Freedom sold its Florida and North Carolina papers to Halifax Media Group, which itself was acquired by GateHouse Media in 2015. In 2015, Halifax was acquired by New Media Investment Group.

The Sun Journal has the following lineage:

- Sun Journal (1930–present)
- The New Bern Sun journal (1915-1930)
- The New Bernian (1921-1932)
- The New Bern Sun (1912-1915)
- The Daily Journal (1913-1915)
- The Sun (1907-1912)
- The Morning New Bernian (1916-1921)
- New Berne Times, and Republic-courier (1876-18??)

In November 2022 Paxton Media Group acquired the New Bern Sun Journal and five other North Carolina newspapers from Gannett Co., Inc.

== See also ==
- List of newspapers in North Carolina
