= Craig A. Dubow =

American businessman

- Born: October 26, 1954 (age 70)
- Education: University of Texas at Austin
- Known for: Former Chairman and CEO of Gannett Company

Craig A. Dubow is the former chairman, president and chief executive officer of Gannett Company.

== Biography ==
Dubow was born on October 26, 1954. He graduated from the University of Texas at Austin in 1977. In 1981, he worked in advertising sales for KUSA in Denver, Colorado. He then worked for KVUE-TV in Austin, Texas, and became its president and general manager in 1990. In 1992, he became the president and general manager of WXIA-TV in Atlanta, Georgia. From 1996 to 2000, he was the executive vice president of Gannett Television. He became president of Gannett Broadcasting in 2000 and CEO in 2001.

He sits on the board of directors of Broadcast Music Incorporated and the Associated Press. He is a member of the Business Roundtable and the Development Board of the University of Texas at Austin. He has been on the boards of directors of MSTV, CBS and NBC.

Dubow's annual compensation at Gannett was approximately $4.5 million. He retired on October 6, 2011, for health reasons. He left with a golden parachute and could receive retirement and disability benefits valued at $37 million. The amount of his retirement and disability payout has been criticized as excessive in light of the facts that under Dubow's five-year tenure as CEO, Gannett's share price fell to $10 per share from over $70, and the number of employees was reduced from 52,000 to 32,000.

He lives in Great Falls, Virginia, with his wife Denise.
