= The Houma Courier =

American daily newspaper

The Courier
- Type: Daily newspaper
- Format: Broadsheet
- Owner: USA Today Co.
- Founded: 1878
- Circulation: 5,062 Daily; 7,783 Sunday
- Website: houmatoday.com

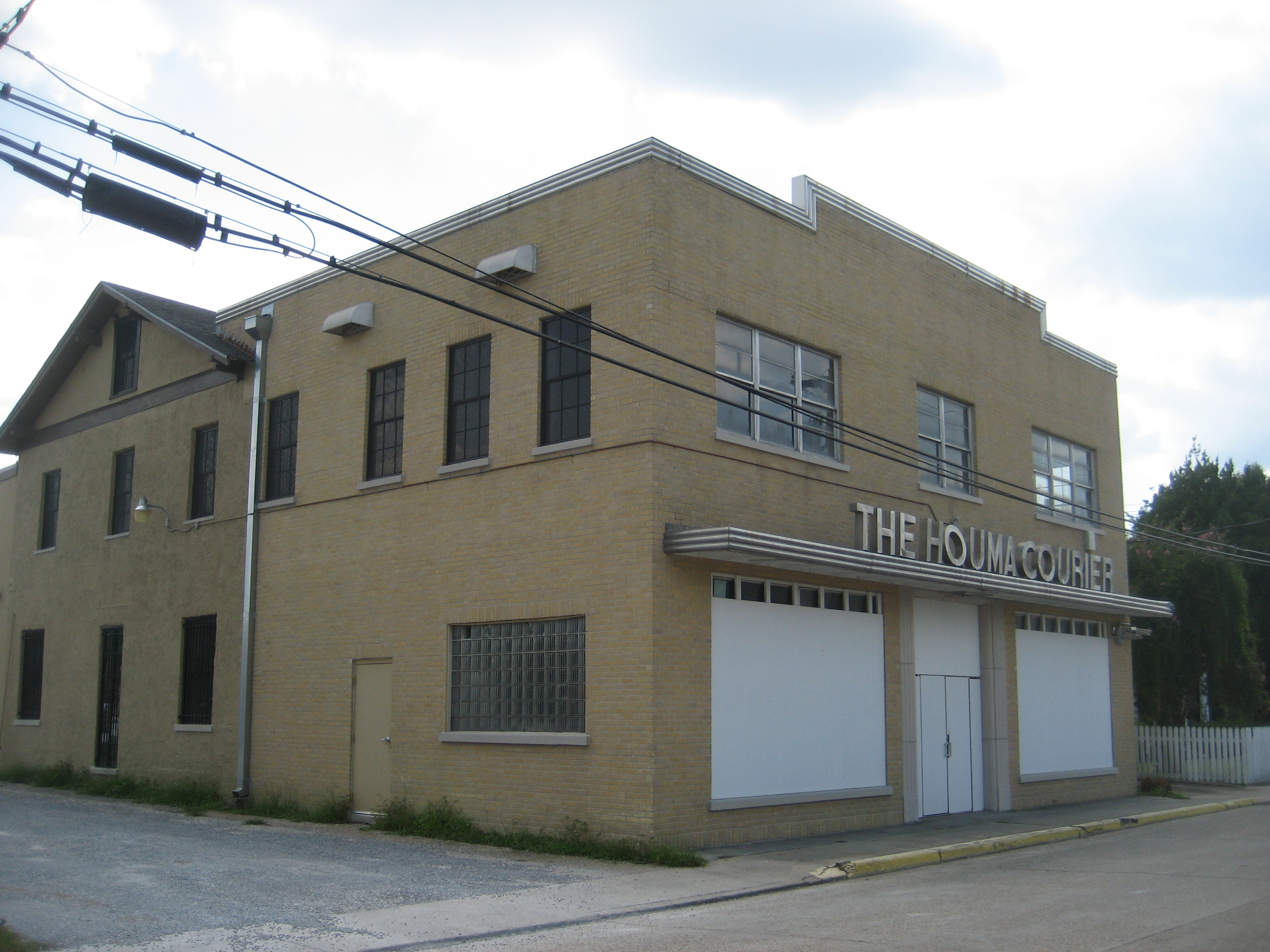
Former Houma Courier building

The Houma Courier is a newspaper published daily in Houma, Louisiana, United States, covering Terrebonne Parish. It is sometimes simply referred to as The Courier. The paper was founded in 1878 as Le Courrier de Houma by French-born Lafayette Bernard Filhucan Bazet. It first published in four-page, half-French half-English editions.

It was owned by Halifax Media Group until 2015, when In 2015, Halifax was acquired by GateHouse Media. GateHouse was later subsumed into Gannett.

The Courier has a daily circulation of 19,700 and a Sunday circulation of 22,100. Its online edition, Houma Today, was launched in May 1999.

The Courier won the Louisiana Press Association's Newspaper of the Year award in various categories in 2017.

== See also ==
- List of French-language newspapers published in the United States
