= Times-News (Hendersonville, North Carolina) =

American newspaper

- Front cover on February 28, 2012
- Type: Daily newspaper
- Format: Broadsheet
- Owner: USA Today Co.
- Publisher: Lucy Talley, Ned Cowan
- Editor: Jennifer Heaslip, Diane Norman
- Founded: 1881
- Language: American English
- Headquarters: 106 Henderson Crossing; Hendersonville, NC, 28792; United States
- City: Hendersonville
- Country: United States of America
- Circulation: 6,217 (as of 2018)
- ISSN: 1042-2323
- OCLC number: 13285937
- Website: blueridgenow.com

The Times-News is an American, English language daily newspaper headquartered in Hendersonville, North Carolina. It has served Henderson, Transylvania and Polk counties in the Blue Ridge Mountains of Western North Carolina since 1881. The Hendersonville Times began in 1881 and the Hendersonville News in 1894.

== History ==
The Times-News was founded in 1881. The newspaper has been known as:

- The Times-News. (Hendersonville, N.C.) 1927-current
- Hendersonville Times. (Hendersonville, N.C.) 1924-1927
- The Hendersonville News. (Hendersonville, N.C.) 1919-1927
- The News of Henderson County. (Hendersonville, N.C.) 1918-1919
- Independent Herald. (Hendersonville, N.C.) 1881-18??

In December 1985, it became an A.M. paper and added a Sunday edition. With a daily circulation of approximately 15,000, the Times-News averages about 40,000 readers per day.

In May 2007, it relaunched its website (formerly known as HendersonvilleNews.com) as BlueRidgeNow.com. The Times-News also has a Facebook page, the BlueRidgeNow (BRN).

The Times-News was owned by Halifax Media Group until 2015, when Halifax was acquired by New Media Investment Group.
