= Star-News =

Newspaper in North Carolina, US

StarNews

- Type: Daily newspaper
- Format: Broadsheet
- Owner: USA Today Co.
- Founder: William H. Bernard
- Editor: Sherry Jones
- Founded: September 23, 1867
- Language: American English
- Headquarters: 5041 New Centre Drive, Suite 115; Wilmington, North Carolina; United States
- Circulation: 20,088 (as of 2018)
- ISSN: 1937-4100
- OCLC number: 52221738
- Website: starnewsonline.com

StarNews is an American, English language daily newspaper for Wilmington, North Carolina, and its surrounding area (known as the Lower Cape Fear). It is North Carolina's oldest newspaper in continuous publication. It was owned by Halifax Media Group until 2015, when Halifax was acquired by New Media Investment Group. New Media merged with Gannett in 2019, and the combined company took the Gannett name.

The StarNews covers a three-county region in Southeastern North Carolina: New Hanover, Brunswick and Pender.

== History ==
Owner	Years
New York Times Company	1975 – January 6, 2012
Halifax Media Group	January 6, 2012 – 2015
GateHouse Media	2015–2019
Gannett	2019–

The paper was originally published on September 23, 1867, as the Wilmington Evening Star by former Confederate Major William H. Bernard. Shortly after first publishing the paper, Bernard changed the paper to come out in the morning and changed the paper name to the Wilmington Morning Star. Bernard had previously edited for the defunct Wilmington Dispatch. The Star contained quality news coverage and was successful in its early years. Politically, it supported the Conservative Party. "[I]t was an ardent advocacy of white supremacy—a view never more strongly demonstrated than in its coverage of the Wilmington race riots of 1898."

In 1927, R. W. Page bought the Morning Star, and in 1929 bought the city's afternoon newspaper, the Wilmington News-Dispatch, which was later shortened to simply the Wilmington News. Later in 1929, the two papers began running a combined edition on Sunday, the Star-News. Page and his family continued to own the paper until 1975, when it was acquired by The New York Times Company.

From 1935 to 1970, the Morning Star was located in the Murchison Building on North Front Street in downtown Wilmington. The newspaper moved into its location at 1003 17th Street South in 1970.

On April 24, 2003; separate delivery of the Morning Star and News ended, and the two papers merged into a single seven-day paper, the StarNews.

As a result of damage from Hurricane Florence in September 2018, the StarNews moved into a temporary location in the Harrelson Building, after operating from a Hampton Inn, WWAY, and even homes of staff. The StarNews never stopped publishing during the storm.

In March 2022, the Star-News moved to a six day printing schedule, eliminating its printed Saturday edition.

In December 2023, the paper announced it was switching from carrier to mail delivery via the U.S. Postal Service.

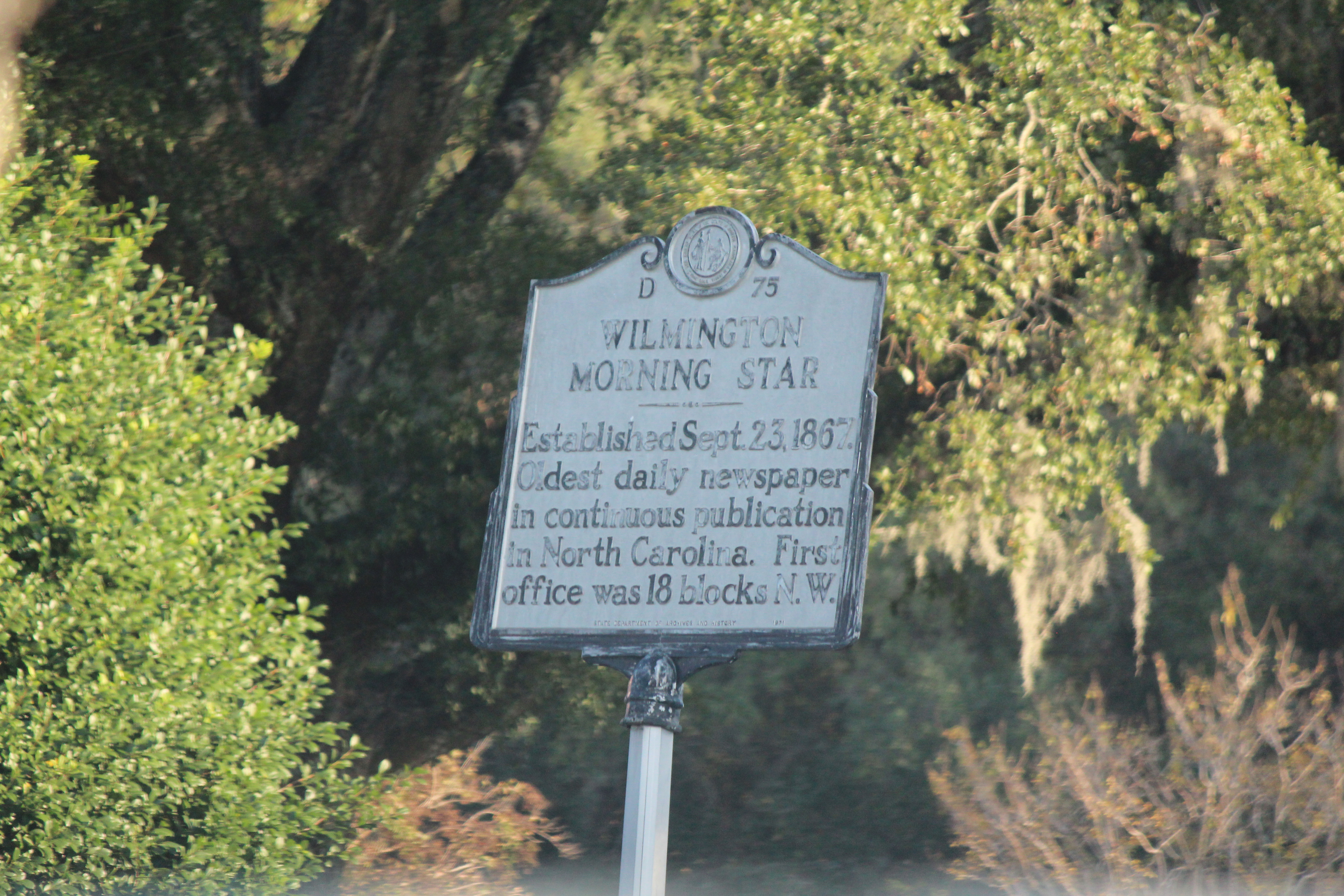
Historic sign marker for the Wilmington Morning Star

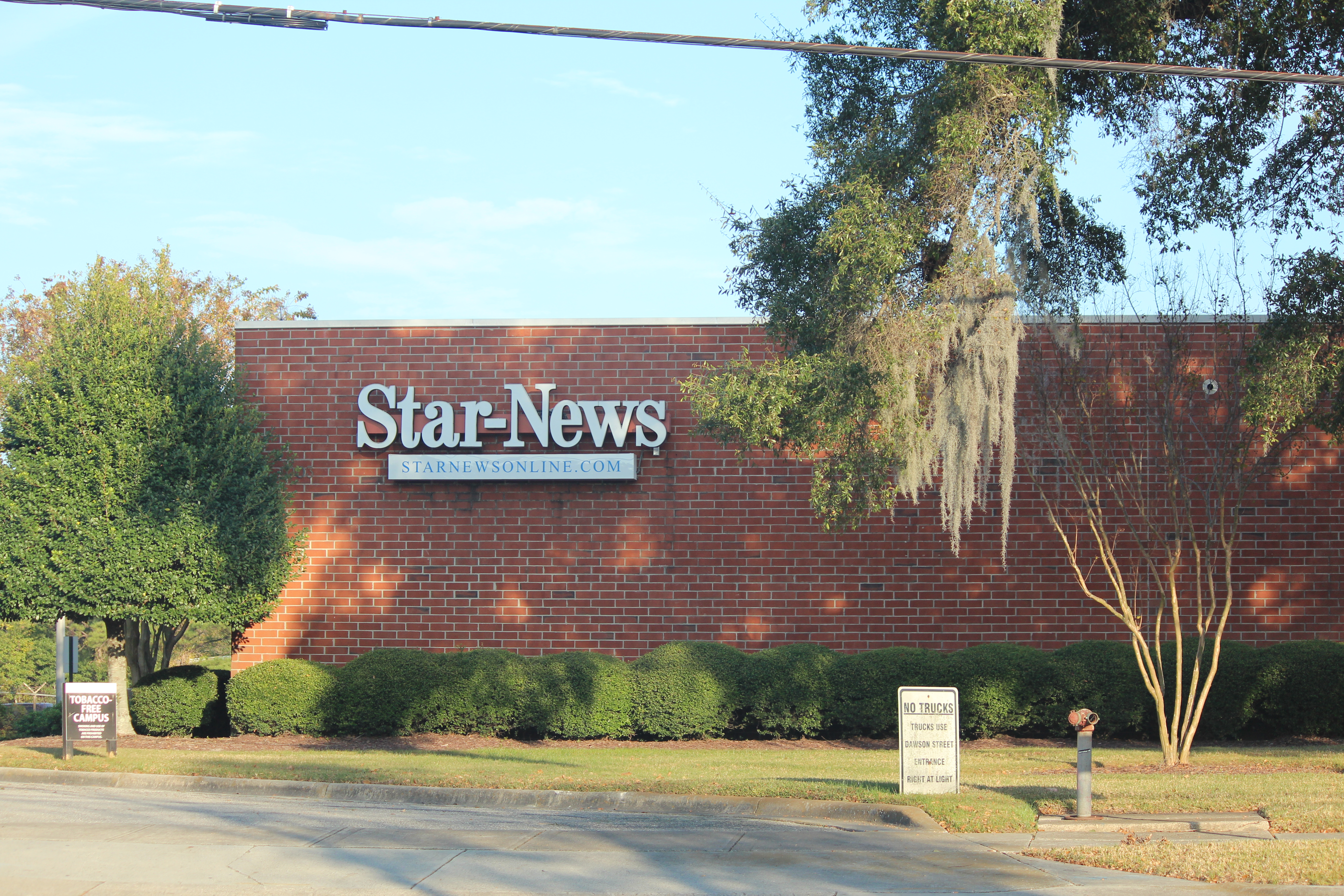
The former headquarters for the StarNews in Wilmington, North Carolina

== See also ==
- List of newspapers in North Carolina

== Works cited ==
- Evans, William McKee (1995). Ballots and Fence Rails: Reconstruction on the Lower Cape Fear (reprint ed.). Athens: University of Georgia Press. ISBN 0-8203-1731-4.
