= The Ledger =

American newspaper in Florida, founded 1924

- Front page of the June 16, 2015, issue
- Type: Daily newspaper
- Format: Broadsheet
- Owner: USA Today Co.
- Editor: Leon Tucker
- Founded: August 22, 1924
- Headquarters: Lakeland, Florida
- Circulation: 16,835
- ISSN: 0163-0288
- OCLC number: 187953892
- Website: theledger.com

The Ledger is a daily newspaper serving Lakeland, Florida, and the Polk County area.

== History ==
The paper was founded on August 22, 1924, as the Lakeland Evening Ledger. In 1927, it bought its main competitor, the morning Lakeland Star-Telegram. By 1930, it was obvious that Lakeland could not support two papers, so Ledger Publishing Company merged the two papers into a single morning paper, the Lakeland Ledger and Star-Telegram. In 1941, Star-Telegram was dropped from the masthead, and in 1967 the name was shortened to simply The Ledger.

The New York Times Company bought The Ledger in 1970 and owned it until 2012, when it sold its entire regional newspaper group to Halifax Media. In 2015, Halifax was acquired by New Media Investment Group.

Jerome Ferson became publisher of the newspaper on July 30, 2007. Kevin Drake became publisher of the newspaper on January 21, 2014. In October 2016, Drake left The Ledger to return to his hometown of Spartanburg, South Carolina, to work as a group publisher for GateHouse Media.

Brian Burns, former publisher of The Tampa Tribune, joined The Ledger as publisher on January 25, 2017. He departed the newspaper July 25, 2019.

Louis M. "Skip" Perez has been The Ledger's longest-serving chief news executive, holding the position of Executive Editor from 1981 to 2011.
