= The Tuscaloosa News =

Daily newspaper serving Tuscaloosa, Alabama, US

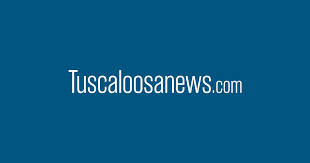

- The November 3, 2008 front cover of The Tuscaloosa News
- Type: Daily newspaper
- Format: Broadsheet
- Owner: USA Today Co.
- General manager: Bobby Rice
- Founded: 1818
- Headquarters: 315 28th Avenue; Tuscaloosa, Alabama 35401
- Circulation: 14,208 (as of 2018)
- Website: tuscaloosanews.com

The Tuscaloosa News is a daily newspaper serving Tuscaloosa, Alabama, United States, and the surrounding area in west central Alabama. It is owned by USA Today Co.

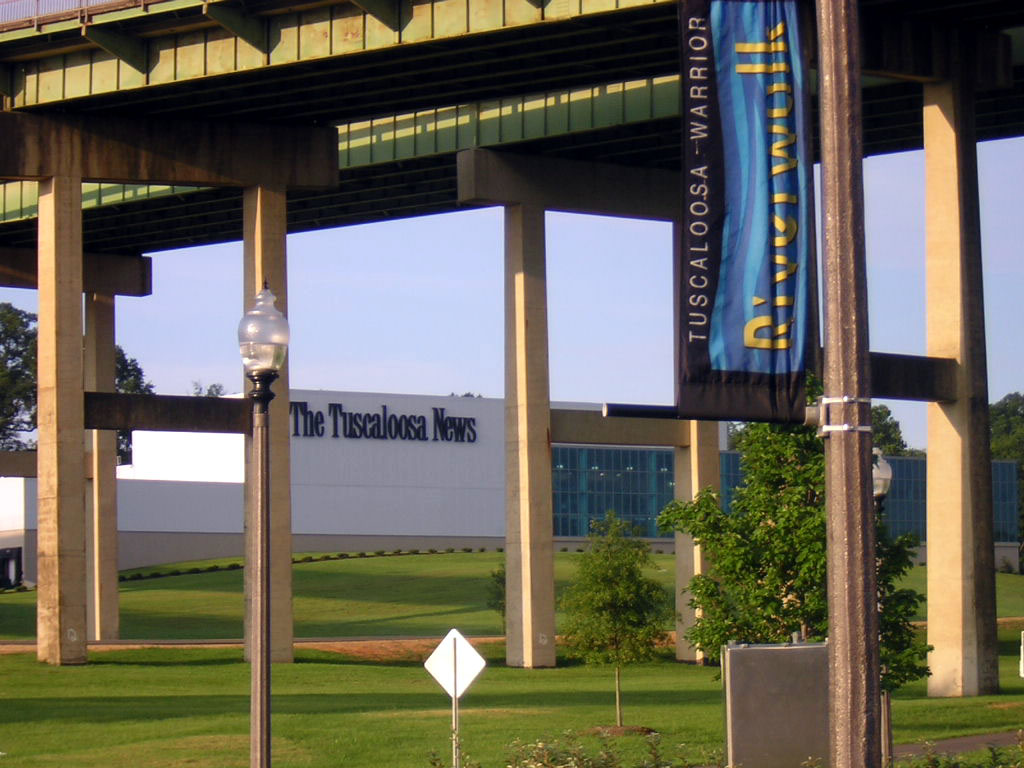
Tuscaloosa News headquarters seen from the Riverwalk

In 2012, Halifax Media Group acquired the Tuscaloosa News. Prior to that, the paper's owner was The New York Times Company. The New York Times Company acquired the News in 1985 from the Public Welfare Foundation, a charitable entity. The News had been donated to that foundation by its owner Edward Marsh, along with other newspapers he owned, before his death in 1964.

In 2015, Halifax was acquired by GateHouse Media (legally known as New Media Investment Group). In 2019, Gatehouse's parent company was purchased by Gannett.

The News has a 12-month average circulation in 2008 of 32,700 daily and 34,600 Sunday. Of the 25 daily newspapers published in Alabama, the News has the fifth-highest daily circulation. Beginning in 2001, the News constructed and occupied a new 90,000-square-foot (8,400 m^{2}) facility overlooking the Black Warrior River.

The Tuscaloosa News has received two Pulitzer Prizes. The first was in 1957, when the paper won the prize for editorial writing, for Buford Boone's editorials on the issue of segregation at the University of Alabama, as exemplified by "What A Price For Peace". The second Pulitzer Prize was awarded for the paper's outstanding reporting on the tornado outbreaks of April 25 to 28, 2011.

Because Tuscaloosa is home to the University of Alabama, the News places particular emphasis on coverage of its sports programs, and maintains a separate website for that coverage.

Since late 2012, the Tuscaloosa News has become available in the Birmingham, Alabama, area. The reason for its expansion into Birmingham is to fill a perceived void in the market when the Birmingham News cut back publication to three days a week earlier in the year.

In March 2022, the Tuscaloosa News moved to a six day printing schedule, eliminating its printed Saturday edition.
