= The Gadsden Times =

Daily newspaper in Gadsden, Alabama

- The Gadsden Times, September 2, 2008
- Type: Daily newspaper
- Format: Broadsheet
- Owner: USA Today Co.
- Editor: Vacant
- Founded: 1866
- Headquarters: 401 Locust Street; Gadsden, Alabama 35902
- Circulation: 7,384 (as of 2018)
- Website: gadsdentimes.com

The Gadsden Times is a daily newspaper serving Gadsden, Alabama, and the surrounding area in northeastern Alabama.

The Times was owned by Halifax Media Group. Before that, the newspaper was a member of the New York Times Regional Media Group, a subsidiary of the New York Times Company, through the corporate entity of NYT Holdings, Inc., an Alabama corporation. The New York Times Company acquired the Times in 1985 from the Public Welfare Foundation, a charitable entity. The Times had been donated to that foundation by its owner Edward Marsh, along with other newspapers he owned, before his death in 1964.

In 2015, Halifax was acquired by New Media Investment Group, and in November 2019, New Media amalgamated with Gannett.

Of the 25 daily newspapers published in Alabama, the Times has the ninth highest daily circulation.

The Times has received several awards over the years from area journalistic groups, such as the Alabama Press Association, the Alabama Sports Writers Association, and the Alabama Associated Press Managing Editors.

The Times website provides local news coverage, as well as local forum and lifestyle pages. In addition to its editorial offices in Gadsden, the Times maintains a state capital bureau in Montgomery.

In January 2022, the Times moved to a six day printing schedule, eliminating its printed Saturday edition.

== See also ==
- Gadsden Times-News Building
