= USA Today Co. =

American newspaper company

USA Today Co., Inc.
- Formerly: Gannett Company (1906–2025)
- Type: Public
- Traded as: NYSE: TDAY; Russell 2000 component
- ISIN: US36472T1097
- Industry: Media
- Genre: Publishing
- Founded: October 6, 1906; 120 years ago in Rochester, New York; June 29, 2015; 11 years ago (extant Gannett Company)
- Founder: Frank Gannett
- Successor: Tegna Inc. (broadcasting)
- Headquarters: New York City, United States
- Key people: Mike Reed; (chairman and CEO)
- Services: Publishing/digital marketing solutions
- Revenue: ▲US$2.9 billion (2022)
- Operating income: ▼US$–146 million (2019)
- Net income: ▼US$–119 million (2019)
- Total assets: ▲US$4.02 billion (2019)
- Total equity: ▲US$981 million (2019)
- Number of employees: 11,200 (2022)
- Subsidiaries: Newsquest
- Website: usatodayco.com

USA Today Co., Inc., formerly known as Gannett (/ɡəˈnɛt/ gə-NET), is an American mass media holding company headquartered in New York City. It is the largest U.S. newspaper publisher as measured by total daily circulation.

USA Today Co. owns the national newspaper USA Today, as well as numerous prominent regional newspapers. (Note: A non-exhaustive list consists of: the Detroit Free Press, The Indianapolis Star, The Cincinnati Enquirer, The Columbus Dispatch, the Reno Gazette-Journal, the Milwaukee Journal Sentinel, The Des Moines Register, the Tallahassee Democrat, the El Paso Times, The Florida Times-Union in Jacksonville, Florida; The Tennessean in Nashville, Tennessee; The Courier-Journal in Louisville, Kentucky; the Democrat and Chronicle in Rochester, New York; and The Arizona Republic in Phoenix, Arizona.)

In 2015, Gannett split into two publicly traded companies, one focusing on newspapers and publishing and the other on broadcasting. The broadcasting company took the name Tegna, and owns about 68 TV stations, while the newspaper company inherited the Gannett name. (Note: However, the split was structured so that Tegna is the legal successor of the old Gannett, while the new Gannett is a spin-off.)

In November 2019, New Media Investment Group acquired and merged its GateHouse Media subsidiary into Gannett, creating the largest newspaper publisher in the United States, which adopted the Gannett name. Mike Reed was named CEO.

In November 2025, the company announced it was renaming Gannett to USA Today Co.

== History ==
=== 1906–1983 ===
Gannett Company, Inc. was formed in 1923 by Frank Gannett in Rochester, New York, as an outgrowth of the Elmira Gazette, a newspaper business he had begun in Elmira, New York, in 1906. Gannett, who was known as a conservative, gained fame and fortune by purchasing small independent newspapers and developing them into a large chain, a 20th-century trend that helped the newspaper industry remain financially viable.

In April 1957, Paul Miller succeeded Frank Gannett as president and CEO when the group held 19 newspapers over four states; Florida not among them. Miller became frustrated after repeated unsuccessful attempts to acquire a foothold in Florida, then targeted Brevard County. He spoke to Marie Holderman, the owner and publisher of the Cocoa Tribune, and shared his plan for a morning daily paper in Brevard County. Holderman was not interested. Over the next few years, several Gannett representatives attempted to negotiate a purchase, without success.

In the late 1950s, Al Neuharth was assistant managing editor at the Miami Herald and became acquainted with Marie Holderman. In 1963, he was hired by Miller to manage the Democrat and Chronicle in Rochester, New York. Two years later, he asked Miller for an opportunity to persuade Holderman.

In their meeting, Neuharth complimented the Tribune, but told Holderman that she lacked the resources to win a competition. Holderman was invited to Rochester for a meeting to talk with Gannett executives. The Gannett corporate airplane flew four people from Florida to New York.

John Pound, managing editor joined Holderman and her two granddaughters on the trip in May 1965. Convinced of Gannett's determination and at age 81, Holderman decided to sell, and Pound told the executives they wanted $1.9 million in compensation. Neuharth's response: "We told them that was a fair price and we certainly paid her more than she expected to get."

In 1966, Neuharth took charge of Gannett Florida. After a few months, the Hudson family in Titusville decided to sell the Star Advocate to Gannett for $1 million.

Neuharth started Today in Cocoa, which eventually became Florida Today. By June 1966, paid subscriptions were 33,000, far exceeding their goal of 20,000 by the end of the year. The paper became profitable in 1968 after just 33 months.

Miller was succeeded by Al Neuharth in 1973.

In 1978, Gannett acquired Combined Communications Corp., operator of 2 major daily newspapers, the Oakland Tribune and The Cincinnati Enquirer, seven television stations, 13 radio stations, as well as an outdoor advertising division, for $370 million. The outdoor advertising became known as Gannett Outdoor, before being acquired by Outdoor Systems (previously a division of 3M), before the company was sold to Infinity Broadcasting, which later became part of Viacom, and was part of CBS Corporation, until 2014 when CBS Outdoor went independent and became Outfront Media.

In 1979 The News Journal in Wilmington, Delaware was purchased from DuPont and The Tennessean in Nashville when the chain had grown to 79 newspapers. In 1981, Gannett partnered with anchors Robert MacNeil and Jim Lehrer to start a production company MacNeil/Lehrer-Gannett Productions. Gannett broke up in June 1986. In 1982, the broadcasting unit partnered with Telepictures Corporation to start out its Newscope program.

Gannett announced the launch of the national newspaper titled USA Today on April 20, 1982, it initially launched on September 15, 1982, in the Baltimore and Washington, D.C. metropolitan areas. for a newsstand price of 25¢ (equivalent to 83¢ in 2025)

Gannett's oldest newspaper is the Berrow's Worcester Journal based in Worcester, England and founded in 1690. In the United States, the oldest newspapers still in circulation are the Poughkeepsie Journal, founded in Poughkeepsie, New York in 1785, and The Leaf-Chronicle founded in Clarksville, Tennessee in 1808.

=== 1984–2013 ===
In 1984, John Curley was appointed president and COO. In 1985, Curley became CEO and continued as president.

The company was headquartered in Rochester until 1986, when it moved to Arlington County, Virginia. Its former headquarters building, the Gannett Building, was listed on the National Register of Historic Places in 1985.

In 1986, Gannett and former NBC chief executive officer Grant Tinker formed GTG Entertainment, a television production company based at The Culver Studios in Culver City, which produced the first season of Baywatch and the short-lived television version of USA Today titled USA Today: The Television Show. It was dissolved in 1990.

In 1994, the company took over production of Inside Washington, from Post-Newsweek Television, before WJLA-TV and Allbritton Communications took over in 2004.

Douglas H. McCorkindale succeeded Curley as CEO in 2000 and chairman in 2001. That year, the company moved to its headquarters in Tysons Corner, Virginia, a suburb of Washington, D.C.

Beginning in 2005 at the Fort Myers News-Press, Gannett pioneered the mojo concept of mobile multimedia journalists, reporters who were initially untethered from conventional newsrooms and drove around their communities filing hyperlocal news in various formats including text for print publication, still photos for print and online publication, and audio and video for the News-Press website. The practice has spread throughout the chain.

In 2010, Gannett increased executive salaries and bonuses; for example, Bob Dickey, Gannett's U.S. newspapers division president, was paid $3.4 million in 2010, up from $1.9 million the previous year. The next year, the company laid off 700 U.S. employees to cut costs. In the memo announcing the layoffs, Dickey wrote, "While we have sought many ways to reduce costs, I regret to tell you that we will not be able to avoid layoffs."

Logo used until March 6, 2011

On March 7, 2011, Gannett replaced the stylized "G" logo in use since the 1970s (notably used on its TV stations as a corporate/local ID with different animations), and adopted a new company tagline: "It's all within reach."

In February 2012, Gannett announced that it would implement a paywall system across all of its daily newspaper websites, with non-subscriber access limited to between five and fifteen articles per month, varying by newspaper. The USA Today website became the only one to allow unrestricted access.

On March 24, 2012, the company announced that it would discipline 25 employees in Wisconsin who had signed the petition to recall Governor Scott Walker, stating that this open public participation in a political process was a violation of the company's code of journalistic ethics and that their primary responsibility as journalists was to maintain credibility and public trust in themselves and the organization.

On August 21, 2012, Gannett acquired Blinq Media.

Around the first week of October 2012, Gannett entered a dispute against Dish Network regarding compensation fees and Dish's AutoHop commercial-skip feature on its Hopper digital video recorders. Gannett ordered that Dish discontinue AutoHop on the account that it is affecting advertising revenues for Gannett's television stations. Gannett threatened to pull all of its stations should the skirmish continue beyond October 7, and Dish and Gannett fail to reach an agreement. The two parties eventually reached an agreement after extending the deadline for a few hours.

=== Acquisition of Belo Corporation, 2013 ===
On June 13, 2013, Gannett announced plans to buy Dallas-based Belo Corporation for $1.5 billion and the assumption of debt. The purchase would add 20 additional stations to Gannett's portfolio and make the company the fourth largest television broadcaster in the U.S. with 43 stations. Because of ownership conflicts that exist in markets where both Belo and Gannett own television stations and newspapers, the use of a third-party company (Sander Media, LLC, owned by former Belo executive Jack Sander) as a licensee to buy stations to be operated by the owner of a same-market competitor and concerns about any possible future consolidation of operations of Gannett- and Belo-owned properties in markets where both own television stations or collusion involving the Gannett and Sander stations in retransmission consent negotiations, anti-media-consolidation groups (such as Free Press) and pay television providers (such as Time Warner Cable and DirecTV) have called for the FCC to block the acquisition.

On December 16, 2013, the United States Department of Justice announced that Gannett, Belo, and Sander would need to divest Belo's station in St. Louis, KMOV, to a government-approved third-party that would be barred from entering into any agreements with Gannett, in order to fully preserve competition in advertising sales with Gannett-owned KSDK. The deal was approved by the FCC on December 20, and it was completed on December 23. On February 28, 2014, Meredith Corporation officially took over full control of KMOV.

=== Acquisition of London Broadcasting Company stations, 2014 ===
On May 14, 2014, Gannett announced the acquisition of six stations from the Texas-based London Broadcasting Company in a $215 million deal, including KCEN-TV (NBC) in Waco-Temple-Bryan, KYTX (CBS) in Tyler-Longview, KIII (ABC) in Corpus Christi, KBMT (ABC/NBC) in Beaumont-Port Arthur, KXVA (FOX) in Abilene-Sweetwater and KIDY (FOX) in San Angelo. The company's COO Phil Hurley will also join Gannett to continue his leadership role at the six stations. The acquisition was completed on July 8, 2014; in total, Gannett stations now serve 83% of households in the state. Post acquisition, Gannett now outright owns and operates their first Fox affiliates, KIDY & KXVA.

=== Split and further deals, 2014–2018 ===
Final logo as Gannett, used from 2011 to 2025

On August 5, 2014, Gannett announced that it plans to split into two independent publicly traded companies–one focused on newspapers and publishing, the other on broadcasting. Robert Dickey, head of old Gannett's newspaper division, became CEO of the newspaper company, leaving Gannett's remaining broadcasting and digital operations under the leadership of Martore. In a statement, she explained that the split plans were "significant next steps in our ongoing initiatives to increase shareholder value by building scale, increasing cash flow, sharpening management focus, and strengthening all of our businesses to compete effectively in today's increasingly digital landscape." Additionally, the company announced that it would buy out the remainder of Classified Ventures—a joint venture between Gannett and several other media companies, for $1.8 billion, giving it full ownership of properties such as Cars.com. On April 21, 2015, Gannett announced that the publishing arm would continue to use the Gannett name, while the broadcasting and digital company would be named Tegna—an anagram of Gannett. The split was completed on June 29, 2015. The split was structured so that the old Gannett changed its name to Tegna, and then spun off its publishing interests as a "new" Gannett Company. Tegna retained "old" Gannett's stock price history under a new ticker symbol, TGNA, while "new" Gannett inherited "old" Gannett's ticker symbol, GCI.

The two companies shared a headquarters complex in Tysons Corner for a time, though Tegna has since moved to a new 440,000-square-foot office tower nearby, occupying roughly 60,000 square feet.

On October 7, 2015, Gannett struck a deal to buy the Journal Media Group for $280 million, giving it control of publications in over 100 markets in the Midwestern and Southern U.S. Similar to what Gannett had earlier done with its broadcasting assets, the Milwaukee-based Journal had separated its publishing and broadcasting arms in April 2015, with the E. W. Scripps Company acquiring the television and radio properties owned by the former's technical predecessor Journal Communications and spinning out their respective publishing operations into Journal Media Group. In December 2015, Gannett announced that its local newspapers would be branded as the "USA Today Network", signifying a closer association with the national USA Today paper.

In April 2016, Gannett made an unsolicited bid to acquire the Tribune Publishing Company for $12.25 per-share, or around $400 million. This deal was rejected by Tribune's shareholders in May 2016; in turn, Gannett increased its offer to around $15 per-share (around $800 million). Although the two companies held talks during the summer and into the fall of 2016, disappointing earning reports for Gannett for the second and third quarters of 2016 caused Gannett to pull out of talks on November 1.

Gannett announced it would not be delaying print deadlines for the 2018 midterm elections in the United States, meaning that next-day newspapers would no longer contain the election's results, instead directing readers to the Internet.

=== Sale to GateHouse Media and relationship with Softbank, 2019 ===
In January 2019, Digital First Media (DFM) made an unsolicited bid to acquire Gannett for $1.36 billion, but it was rejected for being undervalued. In an attempt to pursue a hostile takeover, DFM built up a 7.5% stake of Gannett's public shares. Gannett subsequently accused the company of engaging in a proxy fight. After a failed attempt to place three DFM nominees on Gannett's board of directors through a proxy vote on May 16, 2019, DFM sold shares lowering their ownership to 4.2%.

On August 5, 2019, New Media Investment Group, parent of GateHouse Media, announced that it would acquire Gannett. New Media Investment Group was managed by a private equity firm, Fortress Investment Group. Fortress was owned until May 2024, by the Japanese conglomerate Softbank. Apollo Global Management funded the acquisition with a $1.792 billion loan. Although GateHouse was the nominal survivor, the combined company took the better-known Gannett name. Michael E. Reed, the CEO of GateHouse's parent company, was named CEO. The merger was completed on November 19. The new management team immediately announced it would target "inefficiencies", which could lead to cutbacks at newspapers and reduction in newspaper staff.

In December 2019, CNBC listed Gannett along with 91 additional Fortune 500 companies that "paid an effective federal tax rate of 0% or less" in 2018 as a result of Donald Trump's Tax Cuts and Jobs Act of 2017.

As of 2022, Gannett's board of directors, which does not include anyone with journalism background, paid CEO Mike Reed a salary $900,000 and long term stock incentives adding to a total of $7.7 million in 2021, the first full year after the merger. The total compensation was estimated with Gannett stock valued at the then current price. During Reed's tenure, Gannett stock has fallen 70%, reducing the value of future equity incentive plan awards.

=== Sued for enabling sexual abuse of paperboys in 1970s New York and Arizona, 2019 ===
In 2019, Gannett was sued under the New York State Child Victim's Act by a former paperboy who accused the company of enabling a former district manager to sexually abuse him in the 1980s. In late 2018 as Gannett was seeking partners for a merger, fending off a hostile takeover and its stock fell, this former paperboy emailed investigative reporters and Gannett management asking them to investigate his claims. In response, Karen Magnuson, then Executive Editor for Gannett's Democrat and Chronicle, told reporters to put their investigative reporting of abuse claims on "pause", and brought the email to the attention of Gannett's management to conduct their own investigation.

Gannett chief operating officer Michael G. Kane sent the original claimant a letter indicating no evidence had been found and they were "closing out" the matter. A few months later New York passed its Child Victim Act lifting statute of limitations on child sex abuse claims. Four more lawsuits were filed in February 2020 Additionally, three more men filed suit against Gannett for child sex abuse in September 2020 and April 2021;

In December 2020, Gannett and its Arizona Republic newspaper were sued by two former paperboys in the Phoenix, Arizona community for enabling its employees to sexually abuse them in the late 1970s. As the New York state window to file under its Childs Victim Act closed in August 2021, another man sued Gannett in Rochester, New York, alleging child sex abuse by the same former district manager of paperboys. This latest case brings the total to eleven men who are suing Gannett for enabling sexual abuse of former paperboys, some as young as eleven at the time.

Nearly three years after the first lawsuit filing, in July 2022, Gannett defense attorneys notified the court of their intent to file a motion to have the former paperboys' Child Victims Act cases taken "out of the state court system and turn them over to the New York Workers' Compensation Board" stating that the 11–14-year-old paperboys should have applied for workman's compensation at the time of their injuries in the 1980s or upon enactment of the CVA in 2019. In December 2022, presiding Judge, Deborah A. Chimes acquiesced to Gannett's demands that NY Workers Compensation Board – despite the existence of the Child Victims Act as NY State law – determine if Plaintiffs have a valid cause of action for damages or whether they are limited to benefits under the Worker’s Compensation Law. This despite the fact that the Workers Compensation Board has no mechanism to consider this question of justice and legal rights, as the Board is tasked by the state of New York solely to: " administer workers’ compensation, disability benefits and Paid Family Leave." On July 26, 2024, this demand of Gannett, received and accepted fully by Judge Deborah Chimes, was reversed, by the Fourth Judicial Department of the Appellate Division of the New York State Supreme Court. The nine plaintiff cases remain pending action by Judge Chimes and her court.

=== COVID-19 pandemic, 2020 ===
In March 2020, Gannett announced that due to the COVID-19 pandemic, it will be forced to make a series of cuts and furloughs. Executives would also take a 25% reduction in salary.

=== Reduction of editorial content, 2022–2024 ===
In April 2022, a committee of Gannett editors made the formal recommendation that newspapers in the chain should significantly pare back the opinion material that newspapers traditionally publish on their editorial pages, including editorials, op-ed columns, syndicated columns and editorial cartoons. According to the company-wide memo, "Readers don't want us to tell them what to think. They don't believe we have the expertise to tell anyone what to think on most issues. They perceive us as having a biased agenda." The memo additionally claimed that editorial content is the least-read content in the papers while being the most likely reason someone gives for cancelling a subscription.

In March 2024, the company announced that effective March 25, it would end its legacy Associated Press premium subscription, meaning it would no longer pay to publish AP dispatches, photos and video from the wire service in Gannett-owned publications. According to a statement from the company, this decision, regarded by observers as a cost-cutting move, "will give us the opportunity to redeploy more dollars toward our teams and build capacity where we might have gaps."

In that same memo, Gannett said it signed an agreement with Reuters to publish the newswire's global content. Gannett will continue to pay AP for its election-related polling and vote-counting, and pay to access the AP Stylebook. Gannett's contract with AP was set to expire at the end of 2024. It is unclear why the company ended the agreement early or how much it was paying AP.

=== Financial conditions and layoffs 2022 ===
In the second quarter of 2022, Gannett's revenue was $749 million, sustaining a loss of $54 million. In reaction to the news, the company announced, "In the coming days, we will be making necessary but painful reductions to staffing, eliminating some open positions and roles that will impact valued colleagues." At the end of August, the company announced that it was laying off 3% of its United States workforce, which was about 400 employees. At this announcement, Gannett also said they would not be filling 400 open positions. At the time of the announcement, Gannett stock, which was already down about 45% on the year, fell an additional 28.5%.

In October 2022, the company announced the second round of financial austerity steps. These included the requirement that all employees take a week of unpaid leave in December, and a suspension of matching contributions to employee 401(k) accounts. Gannett also instituted a hiring freeze and was seeking volunteers for buyouts.

Gannett announced around 200 more layoffs, or 6% of the news division, in November 2022.

As part of the cuts, Gannett stopped printing six community papers, collectively known as the Observer and Eccentric chain, in southeast Michigan, including the print editions of the Livonia Observer and papers covering Westland, Farmington, Plymouth, Canton, and Birmingham. Gannett indicated that the publications would provide online content.

=== List of acquisitions ===
- 1906 – Elmira Gazette
- 1912 – The Ithaca Journal
- 1928 – Democrat and Chronicle
- 1943 – Binghamton Press
- 1959 – Courier Post
- 1965 - Cocoa Tribune
- 1966 - Titusville Star Advocate
- 1969 – Pensacola News Journal
- 1971 – Federated Publications
- 1971 – Honolulu Star-Bulletin
- 1972 – Pacific and Southern Company, Inc (Taken over by Combined Communications)
- 1973 – Oregon Statesman and Capital Journal (These two papers were merged into the Statesman-Journal in 1980)
- 1976 – Tucson Citizen
- 1977 – The Poughkeepsie Journal
- 1977 – Speidel Newspapers, 13 daily and 5 Sunday papers, including Tucson, AZ; Stockton, CA; St. Cloud, MN; and Iowa City, IA. Second largest newspaper acquisition in U.S. history at the time.
- 1978 – Combined Communications, owner of newspapers, television stations, radio stations and outdoor advertising
- 1979 – The News Journal Company, from DuPont
- 1979 – The Tennessean
- 1982 – Mississippi Publishers, owner of The Clarion-Ledger
- 1983 – WTCN-TV (now KARE) from Metromedia and WLVI from Field Communications
- 1985 – Des Moines Register and Tribune Co.
- 1985 – Family Weekly, from CBS
- 1986 – Courier-Journal and Louisville Times Company
- 1986 – Evening News Association and The Detroit News
- 1986 – Arkansas Gazette
- 1988 – WFMY-TV and WTLV from Harte-Hanks Communications
- 1990 – Great Falls Tribune
- 1991 – New Jersey Publishing
- 1992 – The Honolulu Advertiser
- 1995 – Multimedia, broadcaster and publisher
- 1997 – Army Times Publishing Company
- 1997 – Asbury Park Press and Home News Tribune
- 1998 – Daily Record
- 1999 – Newsquest, newspaper and trade publisher in the United Kingdom. Websites include the Glasgow-based job board s1jobs.com and Exchange and Mart
- 2000 – News Communications & Media, newspaper publisher in the United Kingdom
- 2000 – Central Newspapers, six daily newspapers
- 2001 – 21 newspapers from Thomson Newspapers
- 2001 – Surrey & Sussex Publishing, Horley Publishing, and Dimbleby Newspaper Group; newspaper publishers in the United Kingdom
- 2003 – Clipper Magazine
- 2003 – Three newspapers from Scottish Media Group
- 2005 – Detroit Free Press and Tallahassee Democrat from Knight Ridder
- 2005 – HomeTown Communication Network (formerly The Observer & Eccentric Media)
- 2006 – WATL from Tribune Company & KTVD from Newsweb Corporation.
- 2011 – Reviewed
- 2013 – Belo: 20 TV stations in 15 markets, plus 4 regional cable news networks
- 2014 – 6 TV stations in Texas from London Broadcasting Co.
- 2015 – Acquired remaining (56.36%) ownership in Texas-New Mexico Newspapers Partnerships, acquiring control of 11 papers in 3 states
- 2015 – Romanes Media Group, UK regional publisher
- 2015 – Company renamed to Tegna, spin-off of print assets to new company retaining Gannett name
- 2016 – Journal Media Group
- 2016 – ReachLocal
- 2016 – North Jersey Media Group
- 2016 – Golfweek
- 2018 – Wordstream

== List of assets ==
USA Today Co.'s media properties include the following newspapers among the top 100 by circulation in the United States:

=== USA Today Network ===
The USA Today Network is the largest local-to-national publishing organization in the country according to Gannett. USA Today, as the national paper, is its flagship brand. The network uses reporting from local publications in the national publication and vice versa. In 2021, it included local papers published by Gannett in 46 states. In 2023, the network hired dedicated reporters to cover Taylor Swift and Beyonce.

Gannett acknowledged in 2021 that it provided advertisers with inaccurate information for nine months misrepresenting where billions of ads were placed.

=== Print media ===
- USA Today of New York City
- Ventura County Star of Camarillo, California
- The Times Herald of Port Huron, Michigan
- The Arizona Republic of Phoenix, Arizona
- Detroit Free Press of Detroit, Michigan
- El Paso Times of El Paso, Texas
- The Journal Sentinel of Milwaukee, Wisconsin
- The Indianapolis Star of Indianapolis, Indiana
- The Record of Bergen County, New Jersey
- The Cincinnati Enquirer of Cincinnati, Ohio
- The Columbus Dispatch of Columbus, Ohio
- The Times-Reporter of New Philadelphia, Ohio
- The Oklahoman of Oklahoma City, Oklahoma
- The Courier-Journal of Louisville, Kentucky
- The Des Moines Register of Des Moines, Iowa
- The Florida Times-Union of Jacksonville, Florida
- The Tennessean of Nashville, Tennessee
- Democrat and Chronicle of Rochester, New York
- The Commercial Appeal of Memphis, Tennessee
- Asbury Park Press of Asbury Park, New Jersey
- The News Journal of Wilmington, Delaware
- The News-Sentinel of Knoxville, Tennessee
- The Journal News of White Plains, New York
- Reno Gazette-Journal of Reno, Nevada
- Providence Journal of Providence, Rhode Island
- The Daily Independent of Ridgecrest, California
- Redding Record Searchlight of Redding, California
- Observer Dispatch of Utica, New York
- The Gadsden Times of Gadsden, Alabama
- Naples Daily News of Naples, Florida
- The Gaston Gazette of Gastonia, North Carolina
- The Shelby Star of Shelby, North Carolina
- The Daytona Beach News-Journal of Daytona Beach, Florida
- The Columbia Daily Tribune of Columbia, Missouri
- Argus Leader of Sioux Falls, South Dakota

=== Digital investments ===
- Digg — sold to BuySellAds in April 2018

== Directors and senior executives ==
Gannett has an eight-member board of directors and 11 senior executives.

On October 6, 2011, Gannett's chairman, president and chief executive officer Craig A. Dubow resigned, citing health reasons. He was succeeded by Gracia Martore, Gannett's chief operating officer, a 26-year company veteran.

From 2005 until 2008 Sue Clark-Johnson was president of Gannett's Newspaper Division.

In May 2019, Barbara Wall was appointed as interim chief executive officer after Bob Dickey retired.

Mike Reed became Gannett's Chief Executive Officer in June 2020. His immediate predecessor, Paul Bascobert, served in the role for about ten months, starting in August 2019.

== Headquarters ==
In 2001, the company completed construction of its corporate headquarters at the Valo Park business park in Tysons, Virginia. The 1.5 million-square-foot facility sat on a 30-acre site and included a mile-long jogging path, softball fields, tennis courts, a fitness center, athletic facilities and a helipad.

In February 2024, Gannett moved out of its headquarters and planned to relocate to a 24,000-square-foot leased office space in New York City starting March 31.
