= List of Barack Obama 2008 presidential campaign endorsements =

This is a list of notable persons and groups who formally endorsed or voiced support for Senator Barack Obama's presidential campaign during the Democratic Party primaries and the general election. Names listed in bold endorsed Obama before he mathematically secured the Democratic presidential nomination on June 3, 2008.

== U.S. presidents and vice presidents ==
- Former U.S. president Jimmy Carter
- Former U.S. president Bill Clinton
- Former U.S. vice president Al Gore, 2000 Democratic presidential nominee
- Former U.S. vice president Walter Mondale, 1984 Democratic presidential nominee

== U.S. senators ==
=== Current ===
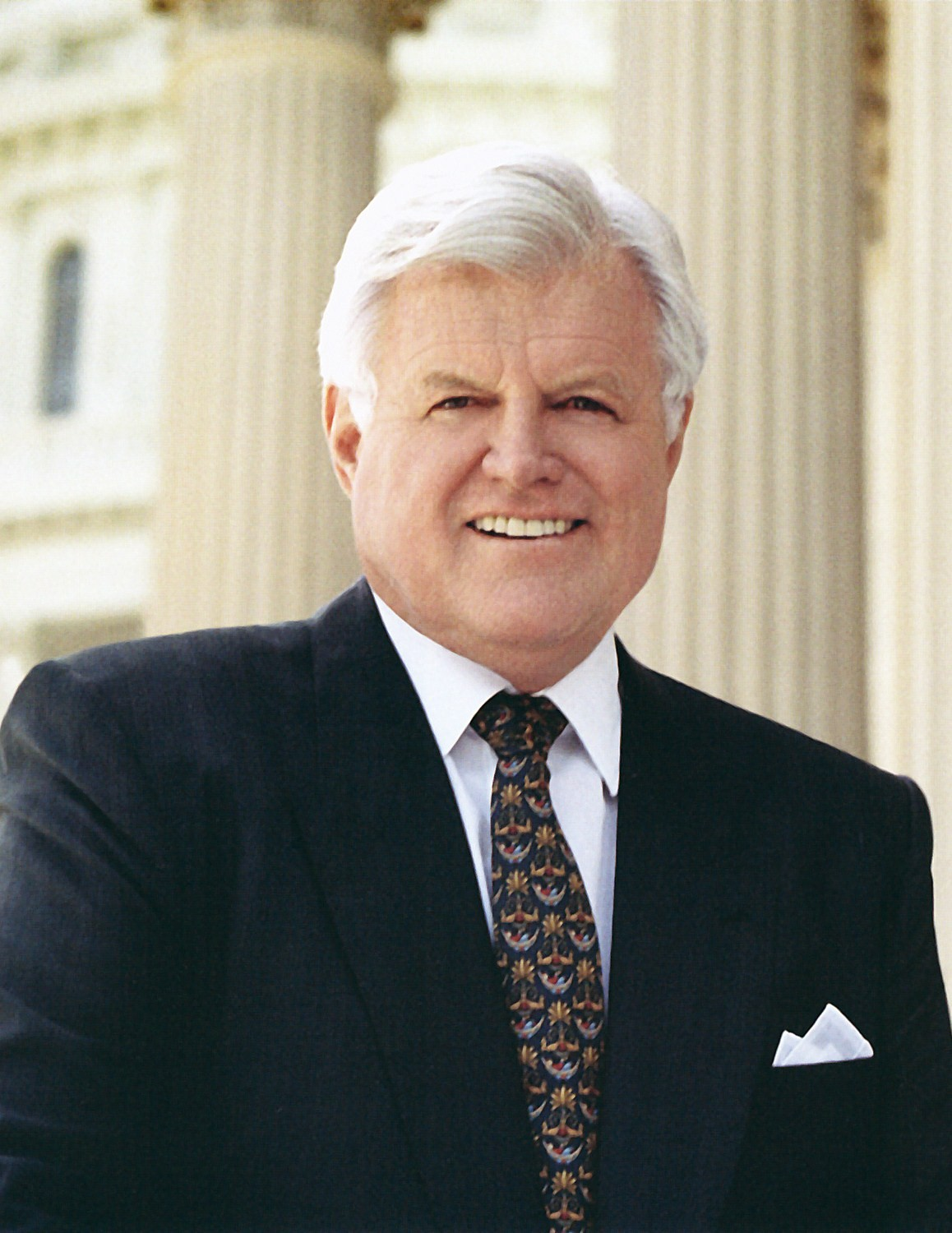
Ted Kennedy

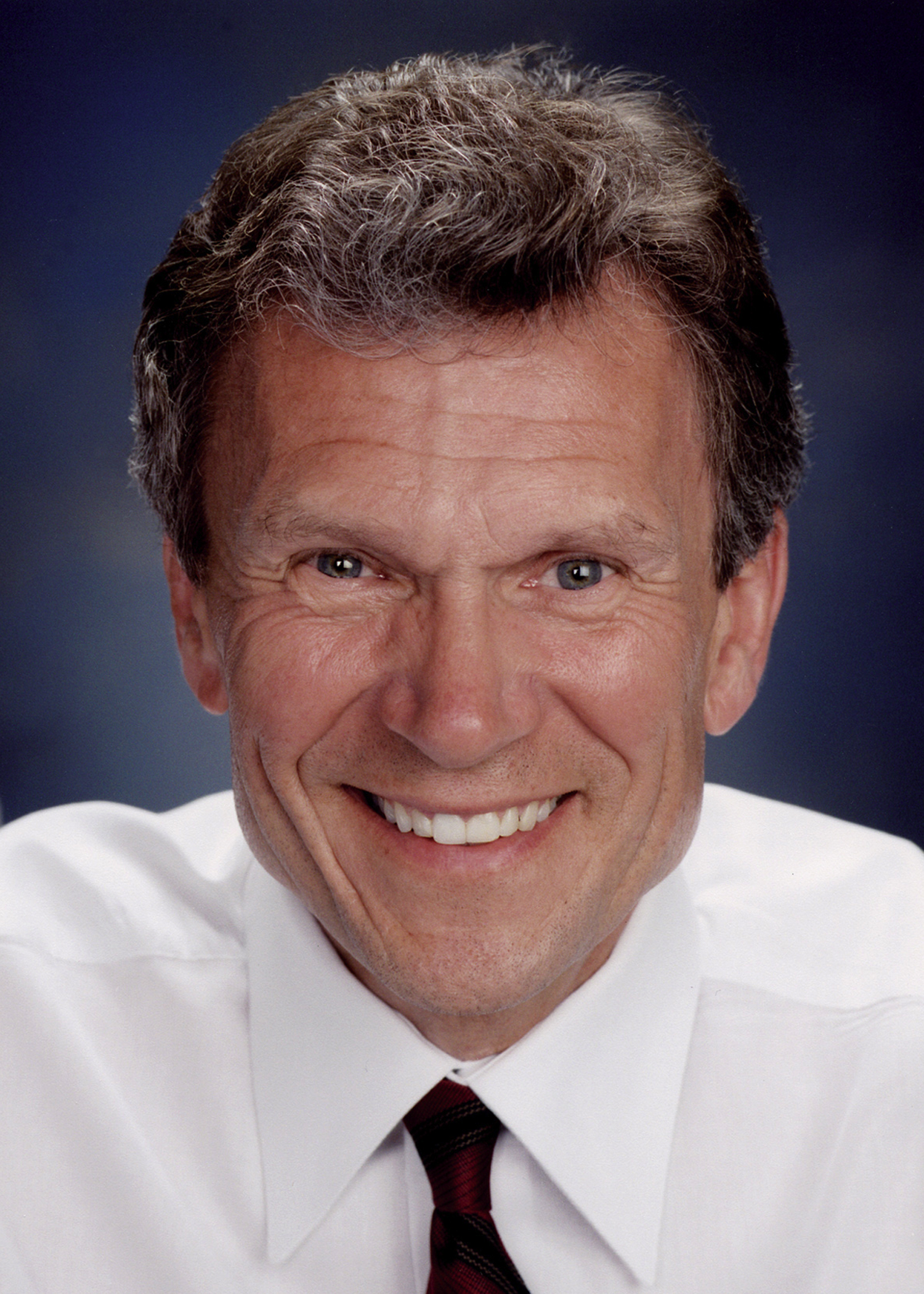
Tom Daschle

- Sen. **Daniel Akaka** (D-HI), Chairman of the Veterans' Affairs Committee
- Sen. Max Baucus (D-MT), Chairman of the Finance Committee
- Sen. Evan Bayh (D-IN)
- Sen. Joe Biden (D-DE), 2008 Democratic vice presidential nominee and former 1988 and 2008 presidential candidate
- Sen. **Jeff Bingaman** (D-NM), Chairman of the Committee on Energy and Natural Resources
- Sen. Barbara Boxer (D-CA), Chairwoman of the Senate Environment and Public Works Committee
- Sen. Sherrod Brown (D-OH)
- Sen. **Robert Byrd** (D-WV), President pro tempore of the United States Senate, Chairman of the Senate Committee on Appropriations
- Sen. Maria Cantwell (D-WA)
- Sen. Ben Cardin (D-MD)
- Sen. Tom Carper (D-DE)
- Sen. **Bob Casey Jr.** (D-PA)
- Sen. Hillary Clinton (D-NY), former 2008 presidential candidate
- Sen. **Kent Conrad** (D-ND), Chairman of the Budget Committee
- Sen. **Chris Dodd** (D-CT), former 2008 presidential candidate and Chairman of the Committee on Banking, Housing and Urban Affairs
- Sen. **Byron Dorgan** (D-ND), Chairman of the Democratic Policy Committee, and the Committee on Indian Affairs
- Sen. Dick Durbin (D-IL), Senate Majority Whip
- Sen. **Russ Feingold** (D-WI)
- Sen. Dianne Feinstein (D-CA)
- Sen. Tom Harkin (D-IA), Chairman of the Agriculture, Nutrition and Forestry Committee
- Sen. Daniel Inouye (D-HI)
- Sen. Tim Johnson, Chairman of the Ethics Committee (D-SD)
- Sen. **Ted Kennedy** (D-MA), Chairman of the Committee on Health, Education, Labor, and Pensions
- Sen. **John Kerry** (D-MA), 2004 Democratic presidential nominee, Chairman of the Small Business Committee
- Sen. Amy Klobuchar (D-MN)
- Sen. Herb Kohl (D-WI)
- Sen. Mary Landrieu (D-LA)
- Sen. Frank Lautenberg (D-NJ)
- Sen. **Patrick Leahy** (D-VT), Chairman of the Judiciary Committee
- Sen. Carl Levin (D-MI)
- Sen. Blanche Lincoln (D-AR)
- Sen. **Claire McCaskill** (D-MO)
- Sen. Bob Menendez (D-NJ)
- Sen. Barbara Mikulski (D-MD)
- Sen. Patty Murray (D-WA)
- Sen. **Ben Nelson** (D-NE)
- Sen. Bill Nelson (D-FL)
- Sen. Mark Pryor (D-AR)
- Sen. Jack Reed (D-RI)
- Sen. Harry Reid (D-NV), Senate Majority Leader
- Sen. **Jay Rockefeller** (D-WV), Chairman of the Intelligence Committee
- Sen. Ken Salazar (D-CO)
- Sen. Bernie Sanders (I-VT)
- Sen. Chuck Schumer (D-NY)
- Sen. Debbie Stabenow (D-MI)
- Sen. Jon Tester (D-MT)
- Sen. Jim Webb (D-VA)
- Sen. Sheldon Whitehouse (D-RI)
- Sen. Ron Wyden (D-OR)

=== Former ===
- Fmr. Sen. Birch Bayh (D-IN)
- Fmr. Sen. **David Boren** (D-OK)
- Fmr. Sen. **Bill Bradley** (D-NJ)
- Fmr. Sen. Edward Brooke (R-MA)
- Fmr. Sen. **Jean Carnahan** (D-MO)
- Fmr. Sen. **Lincoln Chafee** (I-RI) (R-RI while in office)
- Fmr. Senate Majority Leader **Tom Daschle** (D-SD)
- Fmr. Sen. **Dennis DeConcini** (D-AZ)
- Fmr. Sen. **John Edwards** (D-NC), former 2008 presidential candidate and 2004 Democratic vice presidential nominee
- Fmr. Sen. John Glenn (D-OH), former astronaut and 1984 presidential candidate
- Fmr. Sen. Bob Graham (D-FL)
- Fmr. Sen. **Gary Hart** (D-CO)
- Fmr. Sen. Fritz Hollings (D-SC)
- Fmr. Shadow Sen. **Jesse Jackson** (D-DC)
- Fmr. Sen. Charles Mathias (R-MD)
- Fmr. Sen. **George McGovern** (D-SD), 1972 Democratic presidential nominee
- Fmr. Sen. John Melcher (D-MT)
- Fmr. Sen. **Sam Nunn** (D-GA)
- Fmr. Sen. Larry Pressler (R-SD)
- Fmr. Sen. **Don Riegle** (D-MI)
- Fmr. Sen. **Lowell Weicker** (I-CT) (R-CT, while in office)
- Fmr. Sen. **Harris Wofford** (D-PA)

== U.S. representatives ==
=== Current ===
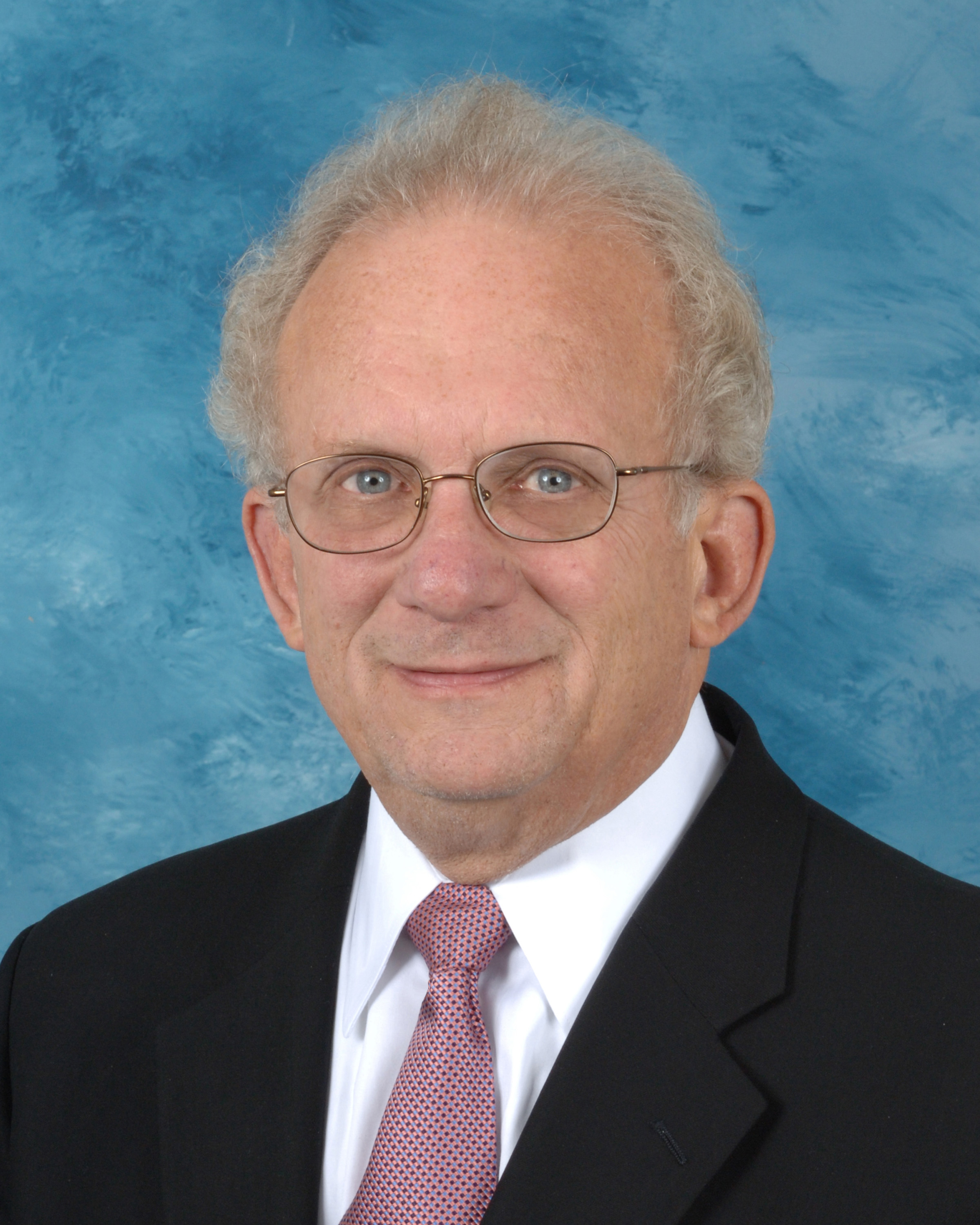
Howard Berman

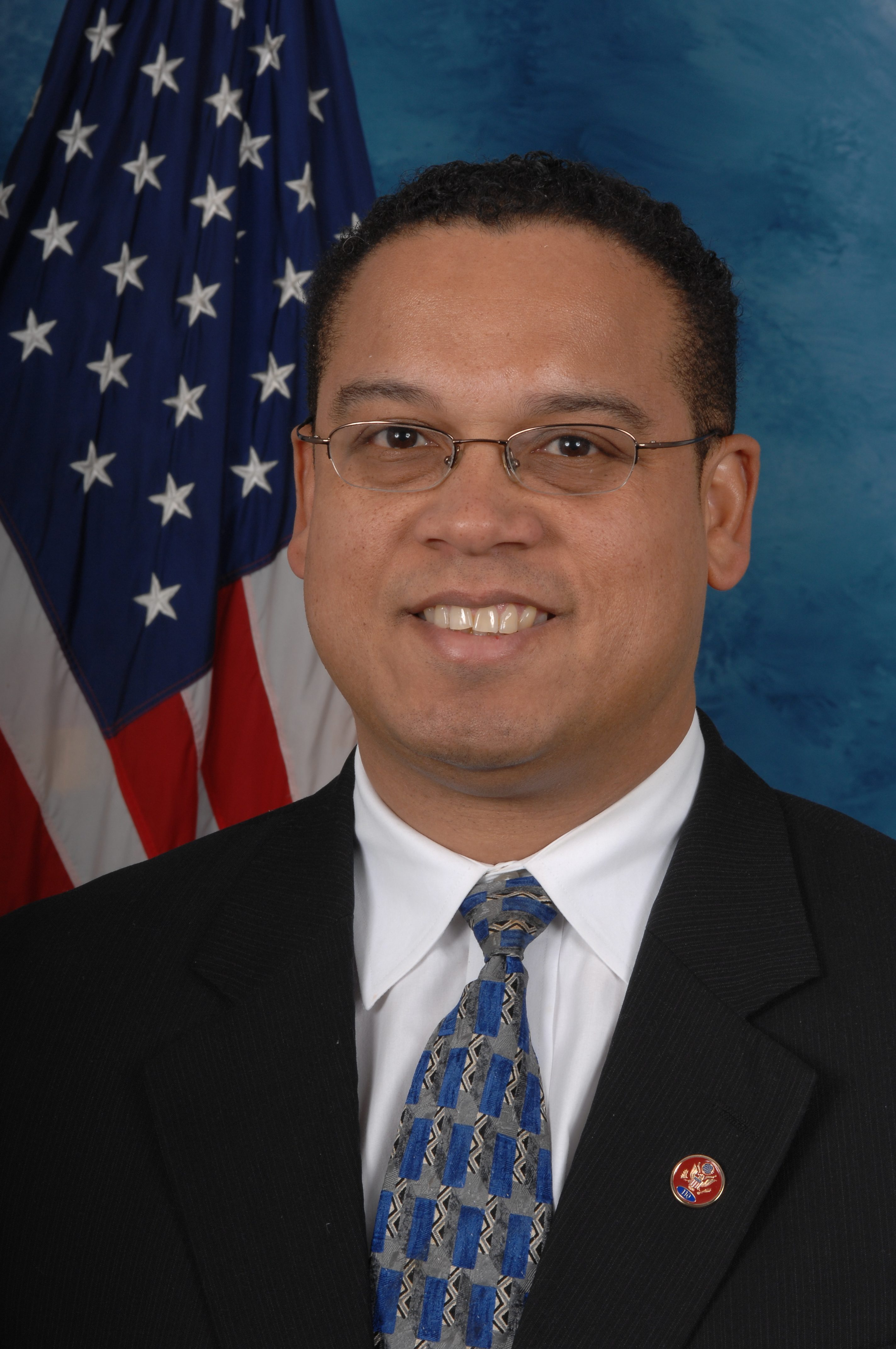
Keith Ellison

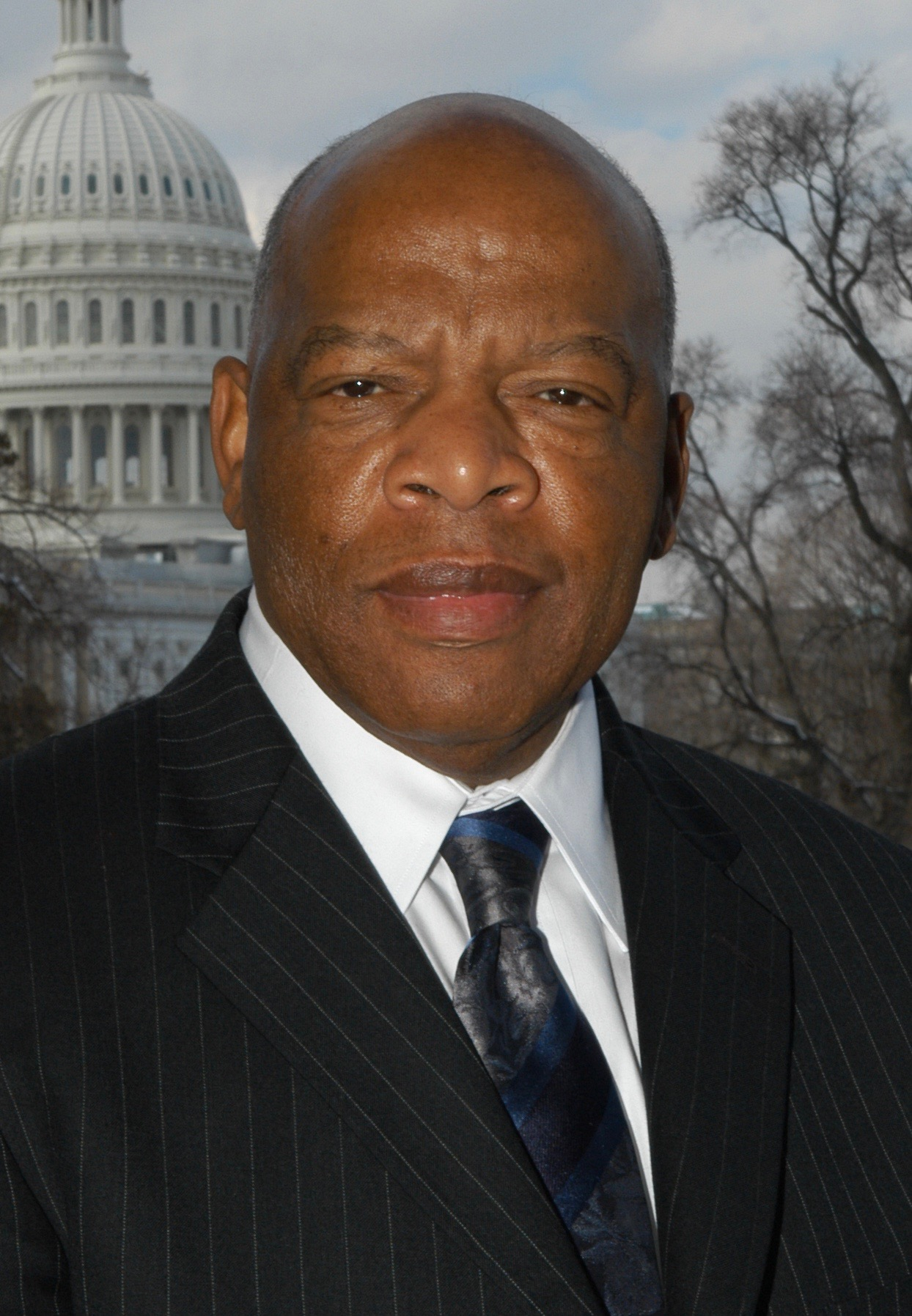
John Lewis

- Rep. **Neil Abercrombie** (D-HI)
- Rep. Gary Ackerman (D-NY)
- Rep. **Tom Allen** (D-ME)
- Rep. Jason Altmire (D-PA)
- Rep. Robert E. Andrews (D-NJ)
- Rep. Michael Arcuri (D-NY)
- Rep. Joe Baca (D-CA)
- Rep. **Brian Baird** (D-WA)
- Rep. **John Barrow** (D-GA)
- Rep. Tammy Baldwin (D-WI)
- Rep. Melissa Bean (D-IL)
- Rep. **Xavier Becerra** (D-CA)
- Rep. Shelley Berkley (D-NV)
- Rep. **Howard Berman** (D-CA)
- Rep. Marion Berry (D-AR)
- Rep. **Sanford Bishop** (D-GA)
- Rep. Timothy Bishop (D-NY)
- Rep. **Earl Blumenauer** (D-OR)
- Rep. **Madeleine Bordallo** (D-GU) (non-voting delegate)
- Rep. **Rick Boucher** (D-VA)
- Rep. Bob Brady (D-PA)
- Rep. **Bruce Braley** (D-IA)
- Rep. Corrine Brown (D-FL)
- Rep. **G. K. Butterfield** (D-NC)
- Rep. Lois Capps (D-CA)
- Rep. **Mike Capuano** (D-MA)
- Rep. **Dennis Cardoza** (D-CA)
- Rep. Russ Carnahan (D-MO)
- Rep. **André Carson** (D-IN)
- Rep. Kathy Castor (D-FL)
- Rep. **Ben Chandler** (D-KY)
- Rep. Yvette D. Clarke (D-NY)
- Rep. **Lacy Clay** (D-MO)
- Rep. Jim Clyburn (D-SC), Majority Whip
- Rep. Steve Cohen (D-TN)
- Rep. **John Conyers** (D-MI)
- Rep. Jim Cooper (D-TN)
- Rep. **Jim Costa** (D-CA)
- Rep. Jerry Costello (D-IL)
- Rep. Joe Courtney (D-CT)
- Rep. Joseph Crowley (D-NY)
- Rep. Henry Cuellar (D-TX)
- Rep. **Elijah Cummings** (D-MD)
- Rep. Artur Davis (D-AL)
- Rep. **Danny Davis** (D-IL)
- Rep. Susan Davis (D-CA)
- Rep. **Peter DeFazio** (D-OR)
- Rep. Diana DeGette (D-CO)
- Rep. **Bill Delahunt** (D-MA)
- Rep. **Rosa DeLauro** (D-CT)
- Rep. Norm Dicks (D-WA)
- Rep. John Dingell (D-MI)
- Rep. Lloyd Doggett (D-TX)
- Rep. Joe Donnelly (D-IN)
- Rep. Mike Doyle (D-PA)
- Rep. **Chet Edwards** (D-TX)
- Rep. Donna Edwards (D-MD)
- Rep. **Keith Ellison** (D-MN)
- Rep. Brad Ellsworth (D-IN)
- Rep. Rahm Emanuel (D-IL)
- Rep. Eliot Engel (D-NY)
- Rep. **Anna Eshoo** (D-CA)
- Rep. Bob Etheridge (D-NC)
- Rep. Eni Faleomavaega (D-AS) (non-voting delegate)
- Rep. Sam Farr (D-CA)
- Rep. **Chaka Fattah** (D-PA)
- Rep. Bob Filner (D-CA)
- Rep. **Bill Foster** (D-IL)
- Rep. Gabby Giffords (D-AZ)
- Rep. Wayne Gilchrest (R-MD)
- Rep. Kirsten Gillibrand (D-NY)
- Rep. **Charlie Gonzalez** (D-TX)
- Rep. Al Green (D-TX)
- Rep. **Raul Grijalva** (D-AZ)
- Rep. Luis Gutierrez (D-IL)
- Rep. John Hall (D-NY)
- Rep. Phil Hare (D-IL)
- Rep. Alcee Hastings (D-FL)
- Rep. **Stephanie Herseth Sandlin** (D-SD)
- Rep. Brian Higgins (D-NY)
- Rep. Baron Hill (D-IN)
- Rep. Maurice Hinchey (D-NY)
- Rep. Ruben Hinojosa (D-TX)
- Rep. **Mazie Hirono** (D-HI)
- Rep. **Paul Hodes** (D-NH)
- Rep. **Eleanor Holmes Norton** (D-DC) (non-voting delegate)
- Rep. Rush Holt Jr. (D-NJ)
- Rep. Darlene Hooley (D-OR)
- Rep. Steny Hoyer (D-MD), House Majority Leader
- Rep. Jay Inslee (D-WA)
- Rep. Steve Israel (D-NY)
- Rep. **Jesse Jackson Jr.** (D-IL)
- Rep. William Jefferson (D-LA)
- Rep. **Eddie Bernice Johnson** (D-TX)
- Rep. Hank Johnson (D-GA)
- Rep. **Steve Kagen** (D-WI)
- Rep. **Patrick J. Kennedy** (D-RI)
- Rep. Dale Kildee (D-MI)
- Rep. Carolyn Cheeks Kilpatrick (D-MI)
- Rep. **Ron Kind** (D-WI)
- Rep. Ron Klein (D-FL)
- Rep. **Dennis Kucinich** (D-OH)
- Rep. James Langevin (D-RI)
- Rep. Rick Larsen (D-WA)
- Rep. **John Larson** (D-CT)
- Rep. Barbara Lee (D-CA)
- Rep. Sander Levin (D-MI)
- Rep. **John Lewis** (D-GA)
- Rep. **Dan Lipinski** (D-IL)
- Rep. **Dave Loebsack** (D-IA)
- Rep. **Zoe Lofgren** (D-CA)
- Rep. Nita Lowey (D-NY)
- Rep. Carolyn Maloney (D-NY)
- Rep. Jim Matheson (D-UT)
- Rep. Carolyn McCarthy (D-NY)
- Rep. **Betty McCollum** (D-MN)
- Rep. **Jim McDermott** (D-WA)
- Rep. Mike McIntyre (D-NC)
- Rep. Jerry McNerney (D-CA)
- Rep. Michael McNulty (D-NY)
- Rep. Kendrick Meek (D-FL)
- Rep. Gregory Meeks (D-NY)
- Rep. Mike Michaud (D-ME)
- Rep. **Brad Miller** (D-NC)
- Rep. **George Miller** (D-CA)
- Rep. Harry Mitchell (D-AZ)
- Rep. **Alan Mollohan** (D-WV)
- Rep. Dennis Moore (D-KS)
- Rep. Gwen Moore (D-WI)
- Rep. **Jim Moran** (D-VA)
- Rep. **Chris Murphy** (D-CT)
- Rep. Patrick Murphy (D-PA)
- Rep. Jerry Nadler (D-NY)
- Rep. Grace Napolitano (D-CA)
- Rep. Richard Neal (D-MA)
- Rep. Jim Oberstar (D-MN)
- Rep. **David Obey** (D-WI)
- Rep. John Olver (D-MA)
- Rep. Solomon Ortiz (D-TX)
- Rep. Bill Pascrell (D-NJ)
- Rep. Donald M. Payne (D-NJ)
- Rep. Nancy Pelosi (D-CA), Speaker of the House
- Rep. **Ed Perlmutter** (D-CO)
- Rep. Collin Peterson (D-MN)
- Rep. Earl Pomeroy (D-ND)
- Rep. David Price (D-NC)
- Rep. **Nick Rahall** (D-WV)
- Rep. Charles Rangel (D-NY), House Ways and Means Committee chairman
- Rep. Silvestre Reyes (D-TX)
- Rep. Mike Ross (D-AR)
- Rep. Steve Rothman (D-NJ)
- Rep. Dutch Ruppersberger (D-MD)
- Rep. **Bobby Rush** (D-IL)
- Rep. Tim Ryan (D-OH)
- Rep. John Salazar (D-CO)
- Rep. Linda Sánchez (D-CA)
- Rep. John Sarbanes (D-MD)
- Rep. **Jan Schakowsky** (D-IL)
- Rep. **Adam Schiff** (D-CA)
- Rep. Allyson Schwartz (D-PA)
- Rep. Bobby Scott (D-VA)
- Rep. **David Scott** (D-GA)
- Rep. José Serrano (D-NY)
- Rep. Joe Sestak (D-PA)
- Rep. **Carol Shea-Porter** (D-NH)
- Rep. Louise Slaughter (D-NY)
- Rep. **Adam Smith** (D-WA)
- Rep. Vic Snyder (D-AR)
- Rep. Zack Space (D-OH)
- Rep. John Spratt (D-SC)
- Rep. **Pete Stark** (D-CA)
- Rep. Bart Stupak (D-MI)
- Rep. Betty Sutton (D-OH)
- Rep. **Bennie Thompson** (D-MS)
- Rep. Mike Thompson (D-CA)
- Rep. Edolphus Towns (D-NY)
- Rep. Nikki Tsongas (D-MA)
- Rep. Stephanie Tubbs Jones (D-OH)
- Rep. Mark Udall (D-CO)
- Rep. Tom Udall (D-NM)
- Rep. Chris Van Hollen (D-MD)
- Rep. Nydia Velázquez (D-NY)
- Rep. **Pete Visclosky** (D-IN)
- Rep. **Tim Walz** (D-MN)
- Rep. Debbie Wasserman Schultz (D-FL)
- Rep. Maxine Waters (D-CA)
- Rep. **Mel Watt** (D-NC)
- Rep. **Henry Waxman** (D-CA)
- Rep. Anthony Weiner (D-NY)
- Rep. **Peter Welch** (D-VT)
- Rep. Robert Wexler (D-FL)
- Rep. Charlie Wilson (D-OH)
- Rep. **David Wu** (D-OR)
- Rep. John Yarmuth (D-KY)

=== Former ===
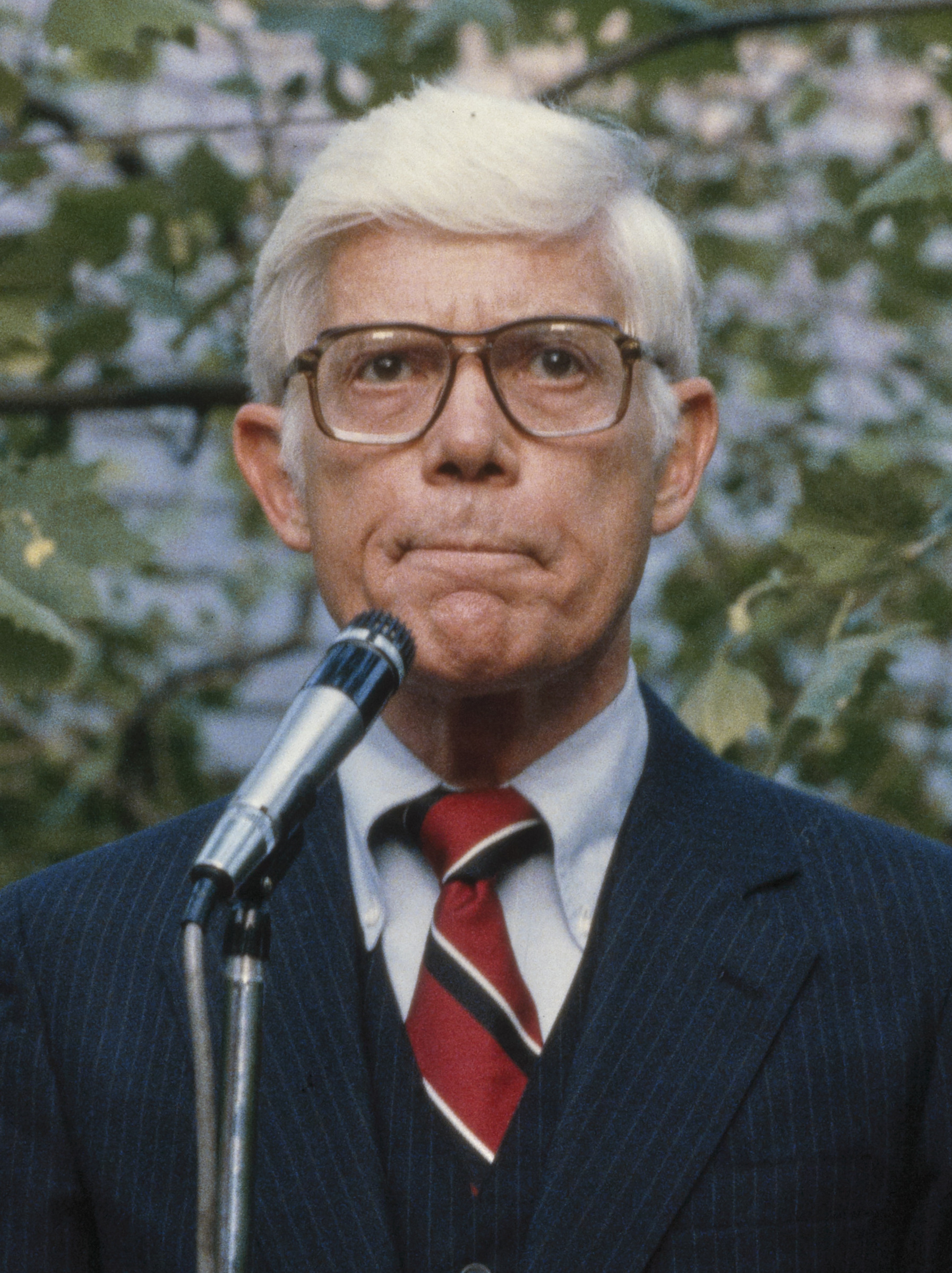
John B. Anderson

- Fmr. Rep. **John B. Anderson** (I-IL) (R-IL while in office)
- Fmr. Rep. Berkley Bedell (D-IA)
- Fmr. Rep. **David Bonior** (D-MI)
- Fmr. Rep. **Brad Carson** (D-OK), Special Assistant to the Secretary of Defense
- Fmr. Rep. Don Edwards (D-CA)
- Fmr. Rep. Mickey Edwards (R-OK)
- Fmr. Rep. Robert F. Ellsworth (R-KS)
- Fmr. Rep. Harris W. Fawell (R-IL)
- Fmr. Rep. Geraldine Ferraro (D-NY), 1984 Democratic vice presidential nominee
- Fmr. Rep. Paul Findley (R-IL)
- Fmr. Rep. **Lee Hamilton** (D-IN), Vice Chairman of the 9/11 Commission and the Iraq Study Group
- Fmr. Rep. **Ken Hechler** (D-WV), former West Virginia Secretary of State
- Fmr. Rep. Andrew Jacobs (D-IN)
- Fmr. Rep. Jim Leach (R-IA)
- Fmr. Rep. Mel Levine (D-CA)
- Fmr. Rep. Ken Lucas (D-KY)
- Fmr. Rep. **Romano Mazzoli** (D-KY)
- Fmr. Rep. **Pete McCloskey** (D-CA) (R-CA while in office)
- Fmr. Rep. **Abner J. Mikva** (D-IL), former White House Counsel under President Clinton; Chief Judge, DC Court of Appeals
- Fmr. Rep. **Major Owens** (D-NY)
- Fmr. Rep. **Tim Roemer** (D-IN), member of the 9/11 Commission
- Fmr. Rep. Claudine Schneider (R-RI)
- Fmr. Rep. Mike Ward (D-KY)
- Fmr. Rep. Howard Wolpe (D-MI)
- Fmr. Rep. **Albert Wynn** (D-MD)

== Governors ==
=== Current ===
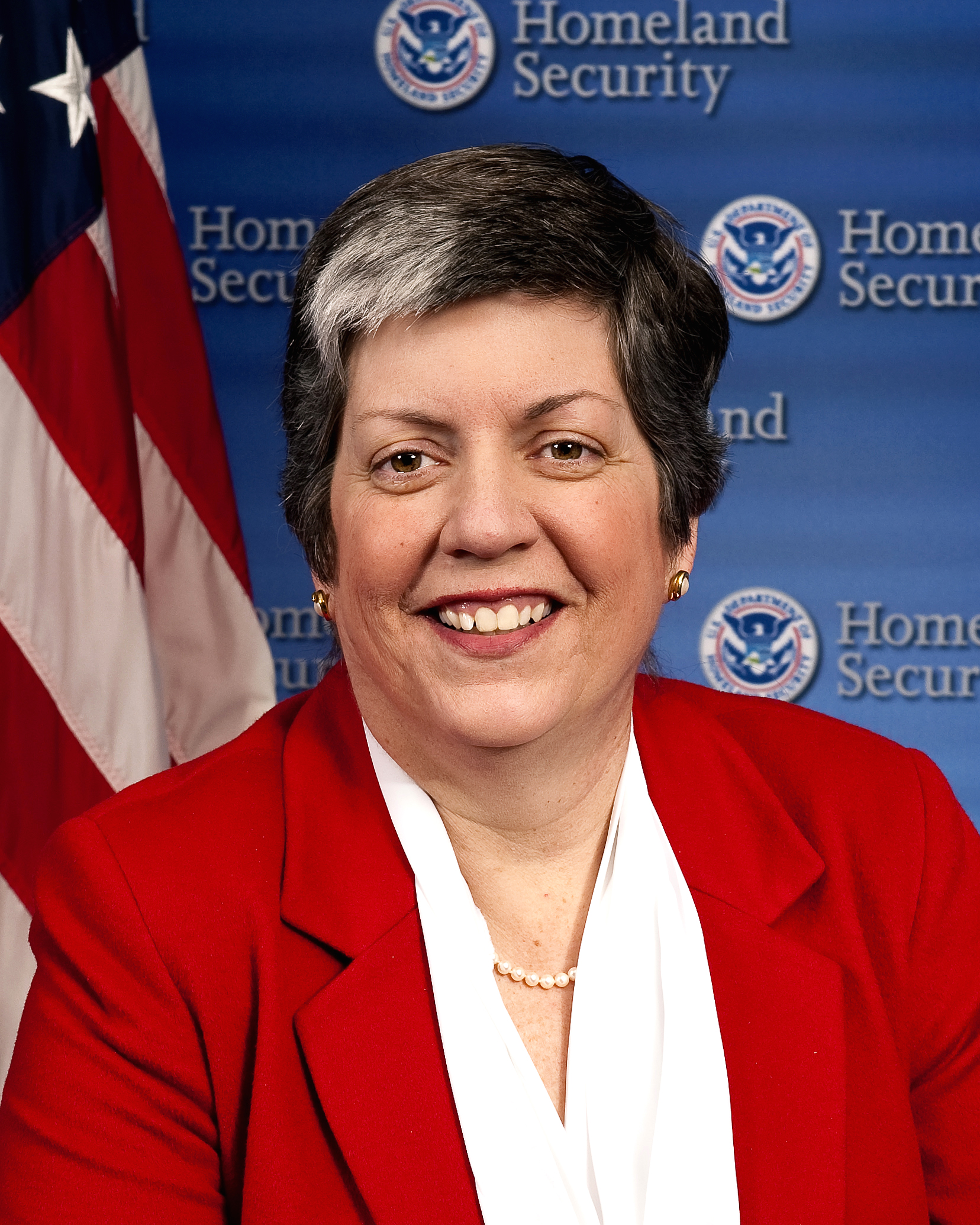
Janet Napolitano

- Gov. **Aníbal Acevedo Vilá** (D-PR)
- Gov. John Baldacci (D-ME)
- Gov. Steve Beshear (D-KY)
- Gov. **Rod Blagojevich** (D-IL)
- Gov. Phil Bredesen (D-TN)
- Gov. Jon Corzine (D-NJ)
- Gov. Chet Culver (D-IA)
- Gov. **Jim Doyle** (D-WI)
- Gov. Mike Easley (D-NC)
- Gov. **Dave Freudenthal** (D-WY)
- Gov. Jennifer Granholm (D-MI)
- Gov. **Christine Gregoire** (D-WA)
- Gov. **Brad Henry** (D-OK)
- Gov. **John de Jongh** (D-VI)
- Gov. **Tim Kaine** (D-VA)
- Gov. Ted Kulongoski (D-OR)
- Gov. John Lynch (D-NH)
- Gov. Joe Manchin (D-WV)
- Gov. **Janet Napolitano** (D-AZ)
- Gov. Martin O'Malley (D-MD)
- Gov. **Deval Patrick** (D-MA)
- Gov. Ed Rendell (D-PA)
- Gov. **Bill Richardson** (D-NM)
- Gov. Bill Ritter (D-CO)
- Gov. Brian Schweitzer (D-MT)
- Gov. Kathleen Sebelius (D-KS)
- Gov. Ted Strickland (D-OH)

=== Former ===
- Fmr. Gov. Cecil Andrus (D-ID)
- Fmr. Gov. **David Boren** (D-OK)
- Fmr. Gov. **Hugh Carey** (D-NY)
- Fmr. Gov. Arne Carlson (R-MN)
- Fmr. Gov. **Richard Codey** (D-NJ)
- Fmr. Gov. **John J. Gilligan** (D-OH)
- Fmr. Gov. Bob Graham (D-FL)
- Fmr. Gov. Wally Hickel (I-AK)
- Fmr. Gov. **Jim Hodges** (D-SC)
- Fmr. Gov. Linwood Holton (R-VA)
- Fmr. Gov. **Philip H. Hoff** (D-VT)
- Fmr. Gov. Angus King (I-ME)
- Fmr. Gov. **John Kitzhaber** (D-OR)
- Fmr. Gov. **Tony Knowles** (D-AK)
- Fmr. Gov. **Ray Mabus** (D-MS), former United States Ambassador to Saudi Arabia
- Fmr. Gov. John Malcolm Patterson (D-AL)
- Fmr. Gov. **Barbara Roberts** (D-OR)
- Fmr. Gov. **Roy Romer** (D-CO)
- Fmr. Gov. Mark Warner (D-VA)
- Fmr. Gov. **Lowell Weicker** (I-CT)
- Fmr. Gov. Bill Weld (R-MA)
- Fmr. Gov. **Mark White** (D-TX)
- Fmr. Gov. Douglas Wilder (D-VA)

== Presidential staff and advisors ==
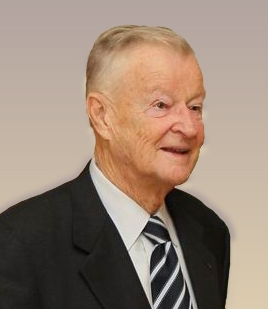
Zbigniew Brzezinski

- Ken Adelman, current member of the Pentagon's Defense Policy Board; former advisor to President Ronald Reagan; former director of the U.S. Arms Control and Disarmament Agency; former deputy U.S. Ambassador to the United Nations
- Madeleine Albright, former Secretary of State
- **Zbigniew Brzezinski**, former National Security Advisor
- Warren Christopher, former Secretary of State under Bill Clinton
- Greg Craig, former Assistant to the President and Director of Policy Planning, State Department
- **William M. Daley**, former Secretary of Commerce
- Kenneth Duberstein, former Chief of Staff (1988–1989) of Ronald Reagan
- Charles Fried, former Solicitor General under Ronald Reagan and former McCain Campaign Advisor
- Eric Holder, former Deputy Attorney General
- **Douglas Kmiec**, legal counsel to Presidents Ronald Reagan and George H.W. Bush, and co-chairman of Romney's Committee for the Courts and the Constitution
- Lawrence Korb, former Assistant Secretary of Defense
- Anthony Lake, former National Security Advisor under Bill Clinton
- Scott McClellan, former White House press secretary under George W. Bush
- Angela E. Oh, former member, of the "President's Initiative on Race"
- Paul O'Neill, former secretary of the Treasury under George W. Bush
- **Federico Peña**, former secretary of transportation and secretary of energy under Bill Clinton
- Colin Powell, former secretary of state under George W. Bush
- Robert Reich, former secretary of labor under Bill Clinton
- Susan E. Rice, former assistant secretary of state for African affairs
- Robert Rubin, former secretary of the Treasury
- Bill Ruckelshaus, first administrator of the Environmental Protection Agency under Richard Nixon
- David Scheffer, former Ambassador-at-Large for War Crimes Issues
- **Ted Sorensen**, President John F. Kennedy's top advisor and speechwriter
- Tara Sonenshine, executive vice president at the U.S. Institute of Peace (USIP); former Special Assistant to the President, National Security Council
- Lawrence Summers, former secretary of the Treasury
- **David Wilhelm**, President Bill Clinton's 1992 campaign chairman

== Military ==
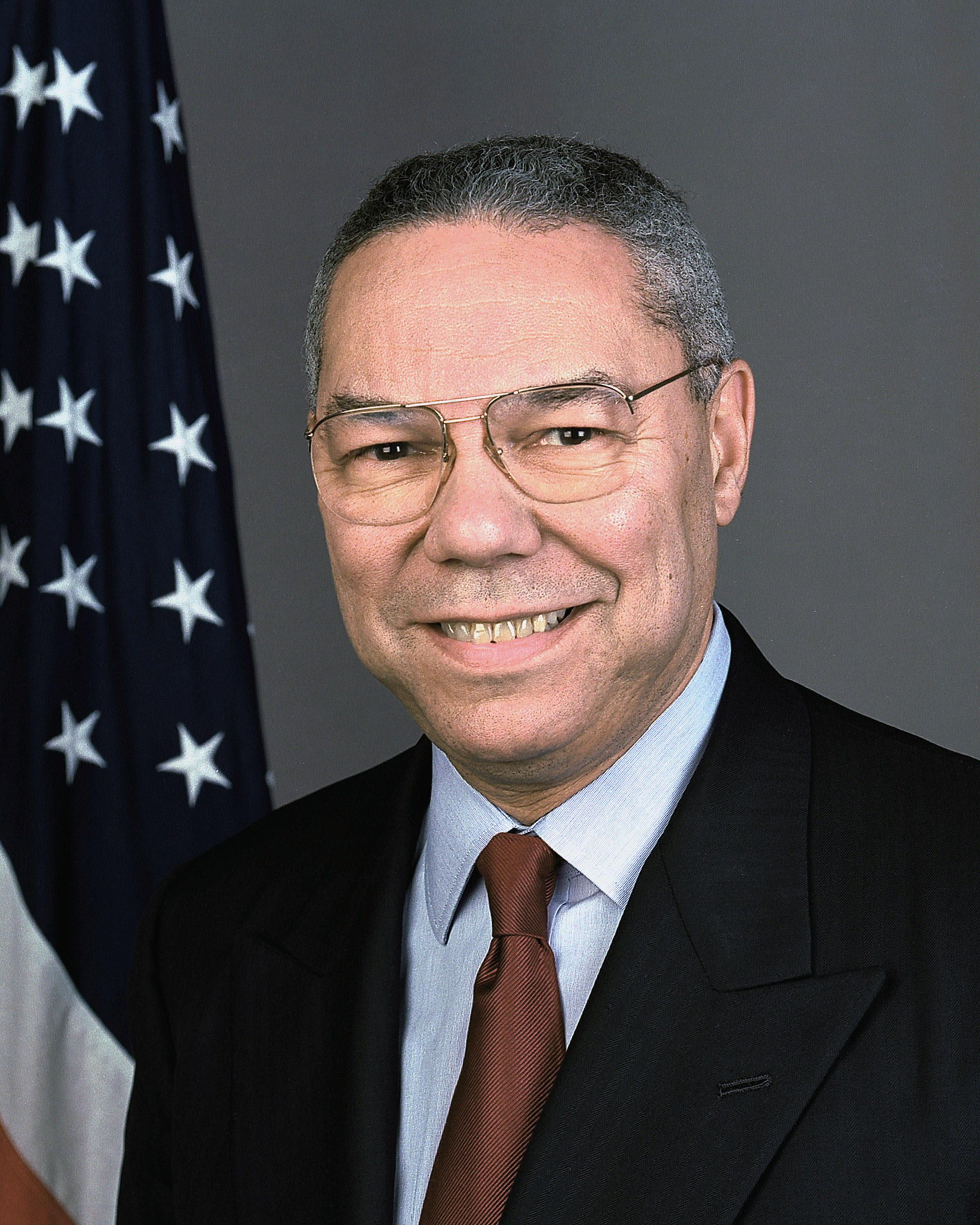
Colin Powell

- Clifford Alexander Jr., former Secretary of the Army
- Susan Ahn Cuddy, first female gunnery officer in the U.S. Navy and daughter of Korean Independence fighter Ahn Chang-ho
- Wesley Clark, four star General (Ret), former Supreme Allied Commander Europe of NATO, 2004 presidential candidate
- **Richard Danzig**, former Secretary of the Navy
- Scott Gration Major General (USAF-Ret), former director of strategy, policy, and assessments of the United States European Command in Germany
- Richard D. Hearney, former assistant commandant of the Marine Corps
- John Hutson, former Judge Advocate General of the U.S. Navy
- Robert G. Gard Jr., lieutenant general (Ret), and former President of the National Defense University (1977-1981)
- Jeh Johnson, former General Counsel of the U.S. Air Force
- Lester Lyles, former Vice Chief of Staff of the United States Air Force
- Merrill A. McPeak, four-star general (Ret), former Secretary of the United States Air Force during Operation Desert Storm
- John B. Nathman (Ret), former commander, U.S. Fleet Forces Command and Vice Chief of Naval Operations
- F. Whitten Peters, former Secretary of the Air Force
- Colin Powell, general (Ret), former general in the United States Army, National Security Advisor (1987–1989), Chairman of the Joint Chiefs of Staff (1989–1993), and United States Secretary of State (2001–2005)

== National political figures ==
- Joe Andrew, former Democratic National Committee chairman 1999–2001
- Jeffrey Bader, former U.S. Ambassador to Namibia and former assistant Office of the United States Trade Representative for Asia
- Esther Brimmer, former member of U.S. Department of State Policy Planning
- Mark Brzezinski, former director of European affairs of National Security Council
- James Burns, former chief judge of the state Intermediate Court of Appeals
- Joseph Cirincione, vice president for national security and international policy at the Center for American Progress
- Bonnie Cohen, former Under Secretary of State for Management\
- Ivo H. Daalder, former director, European affairs, National Security Council
- William H. Donaldson, former chairman of the U.S. Securities and Exchange Commission, appointed by George W. Bush
- Robert S. Gelbard, former presidential envoy for the Balkans; assistant secretary of state for international narcotics and law enforcement; ambassador to Indonesia; and ambassador to Bolivia
- Scott Gration, former director for strategy, policy and planning, U.S. European Command
- Gabriel Guerra-Mondragón, former United States Ambassador to Chile
- Vicki Huddleston, former deputy assistant secretary of state and ambassador to Mali and Madagascar, chief of mission to Cuba and Ethiopia
- Paul Igasaki, former vice chair and commissioner of the "U.S. Equal Employment Opportunity Commission"
- Paul G. Kirk, former Democratic National Committee chairman 1985–1988
- Arthur Levitt, former chairman of the U.S. Securities and Exchange Commission, appointed by Bill Clinton
- David Lipton, former under secretary of treasury for international affairs
- Frank Loy, former undersecretary of state for global affairs
- Terry McAuliffe, former Democratic National Committee chairman 2001–2005
- Donald McHenry, former United States Ambassador to the United Nations
- Norman Mineta, former U.S. representative (D-CA), mayor of San Jose, United States Secretary of Transportation and United States Secretary of Commerce
- Newton N. Minow, former chairman of the Federal Communications Commission
- Alfred H. Moses, former United States Ambassador to Romania
- David Ruder, former chairman of the U.S. Securities and Exchange Commission, appointed by Ronald Reagan
- Dan Shapiro, former director, National Security Council
- Mona Sutphen, former special assistant to the national security advisor
- Paul Volcker, former chairman of the Federal Reserve
- Patricia Wald, former chief judge for the United States Court of Appeals for the District of Columbia Circuit

== Mayors ==
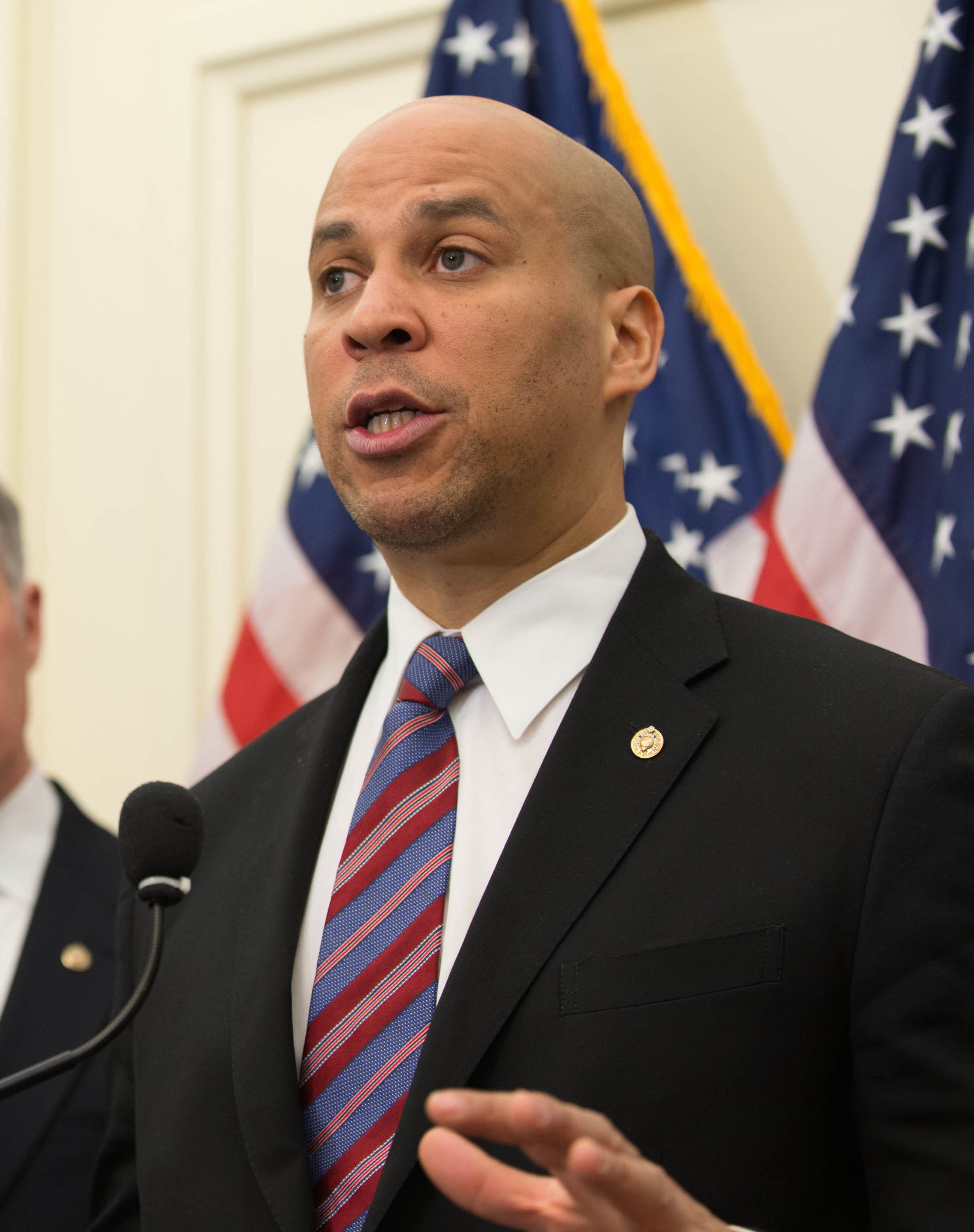
Cory Booker

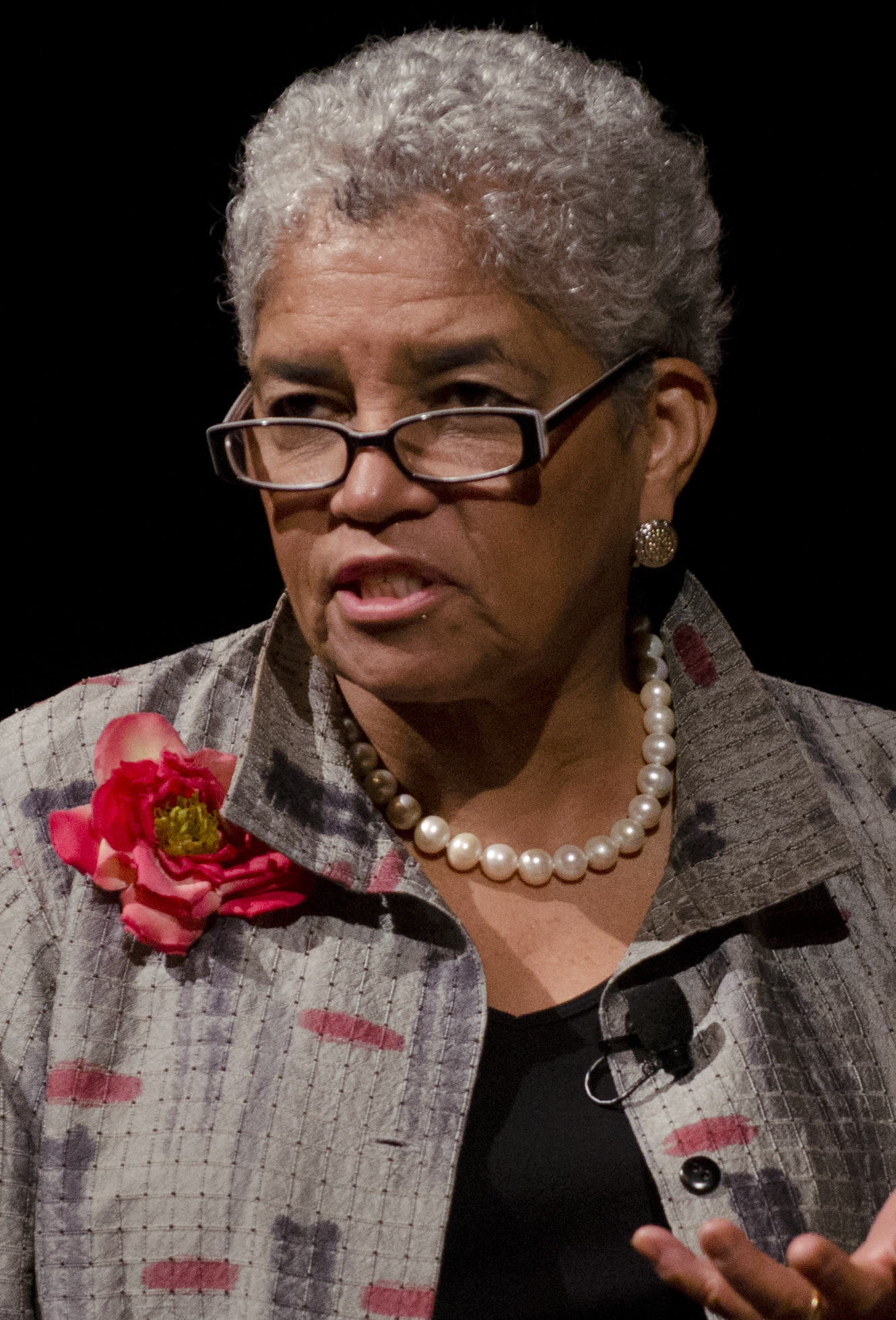
Shirley Franklin

- Anderson, South Carolina Mayor Terence Roberts (D-SC)
- Atlanta, Georgia Mayor **Shirley Franklin** (D-GA)
- Austin, Texas Mayor Will Wynn (D-TX)
- Baltimore, Maryland Mayor Sheila Dixon (D-MD)
- Beckley, West Virginia Mayor Emmett Pugh (D-WV)
- Bloomington, Indiana Mayor Mark Kruzan (D-IN)
- Boise, Idaho Mayor Dave Bieter (D-ID)
- Carrboro, North Carolina Mayor Mark H. Chilton (D-NC)
- Cary, North Carolina Mayor Harold Weinbrecht (D-NC)
- Chapel Hill, North Carolina Mayor Kevin Foy (D-NC)
- Chicago, Illinois Mayor Richard M. Daley (D-IL)
- Cincinnati, Ohio Mayor Mark L. Mallory (D-OH)
- Cleveland, Ohio Mayor **Frank G. Jackson** (D-OH)
- Columbus, Ohio Mayor Michael B. Coleman (D-OH)
- Cumberland, Rhode Island Mayor Daniel McKee (D-RI)
- Dayton, Ohio Mayor Rhine McLin (D-OH)
- Des Moines, Iowa Mayor Frank Cownie (D-IA)
- Durham, North Carolina Mayor **Bill Bell** (D-NC)
- Edison, New Jersey Mayor Jun Choi (D-NJ)
- Evansville, Indiana Mayor Jonathan Weinzapfel (D-IN)
- Fairbanks, Alaska Mayor Jim Whitaker (R-AK)
- Flint, Michigan Mayor Don Williamson (D-MI)
- Gary, Indiana Mayor Rudolph Clay (D-IN)
- Greensboro, North Carolina Mayor Yvonne Johnson (D-NC)
- Greenville, North Carolina Mayor Pro Tem Mildred Council (D-NC)
- Honolulu, Hawaii Mayor Mufi Hannemann (D-HI)
- Jersey City, New Jersey Mayor **Jerramiah Healy** (D-NJ)
- Lincoln, Nebraska Mayor Chris Beutler (D-NE)
- Lancaster, Pennsylvania Mayor Rick Gray (D-PA)
- Las Cruces, New Mexico Mayor Ken Miyagishima
- Laurinburg, North Carolina Mayor Matthew Block (D-NC)
- Long Beach, California Mayor Bob Foster (D-CA)
- Madisonville, Kentucky Mayor Will Cox (D-KY)
- Mansfield, Ohio Mayor Donald Culliver (D-OH)
- Milwaukee, Wisconsin Mayor Tom Barrett (D-WI)
- Minneapolis, Minnesota Mayor RT Rybak (D-MN)
- Missoula, Montana Mayor John Engen (D-MT)
- Navassa, North Carolina Mayor Pro Tem Jerry Merrick (D-NC)
- New Haven, Connecticut Mayor John DeStefano Jr. (D-CT)
- New Orleans, Louisiana Mayor Ray Nagin (D-LA)
- Newark, New Jersey Mayor **Cory Booker** (D-NJ)
- Omaha, Nebraska Mayor Mike Fahey (D-NE)
- Raleigh, North Carolina Mayor Charles Meeker (D-NC)
- Reading, Pennsylvania Former Mayor Tom McMahon (D-PA)
- San Antonio, Texas Mayor Phil Hardberger (D-TX)
- San Francisco, California Mayor Gavin Newsom (D-CA)
- Seattle, Washington Mayor Greg Nickels (D-WA)
- South Bend, Indiana Mayor Steve Luecke (D-IN)
- Southfield, Michigan Mayor Brenda L. Lawrence (D-MI)
- Snow Hill, North Carolina Mayor Don Davis (D-NC)
- Tampa, Florida Mayor Pam Iorio (D-FL)
- West Hollywood, California Mayor John Duran (D-CA)
- York, Pennsylvania Mayor John S. Brenner (D-PA)
- Youngstown, Ohio Mayor Jay Williams (D-OH)

== Publications ==
=== Newspapers ===
- Akron Beacon Journal – Akron, Ohio
- Anchorage Daily News – Anchorage, Alaska
- Arlington Heights Daily Herald – Arlington Heights, Illinois
- Asbury Park Press – Asbury Park, New Jersey
- The Asheville Citizen-Times – Asheville, North Carolina
- Aspen Daily News – Aspen, Colorado
- Atlanta Journal-Constitution – Atlanta, Georgia
- Austin American-Statesman – Austin, Texas
- Bangor News – Bangor, Maine
- The Blade – Toledo, Ohio
- The Boston Globe – Boston, Massachusetts
- Brunswick Times Record – Brunswick, Maine
- Buffalo News – Buffalo, New York
- Cabinet Press – Milford, New Hampshire
- Canton Repository – Canton, Ohio
- Charleston Gazette – Charleston, West Virginia
- Charlotte Observer – Charlotte, North Carolina
- Chattanooga Times – Chattanooga, Tennessee
- Chicago Sun-Times – Chicago, Illinois
- The Chicago Tribune – Chicago, Illinois
- Columbia Daily Tribune – Columbia, Missouri
- The Columbian – Vancouver, Washington
- Commercial Appeal – Memphis, Tennessee
- Concord Monitor – Concord, New Hampshire
- The Contra Costa Times – Walnut Creek, California
- Cortez Journal – Cortez, Colorado
- The Daily Breeze – Torrance, California
- Dayton Daily News – Dayton, Ohio
- Daytona Beach News Journal – Daytona Beach, Florida
- The Denver Post – Denver, Colorado
- Des Moines Register – Des Moines, Iowa
- Detroit Free Press – Detroit, Michigan
- The Durango Herald – Durango, Colorado
- Durham Herald Sun – Durham, North Carolina
- The Eagle – College Station, Texas
- East Oregonian – Pendleton, Oregon
- El Diario/La Prensa – New York City
- The Express-Times – Easton, Pennsylvania
- Falls Church News Press – Falls Church, Virginia
- Fort Wayne Journal Gazette – Fort Wayne, Indiana
- Fort Worth Star-Telegram – Fort Worth, Texas
- Fremont Argus – Fremont, California
- The Fresno Bee – Fresno, California
- Gainesville Sun – Gainesville, Florida
- Greenville Daily Reflector – Greenville, North Carolina
- The Gunnison County Times – Gunnison, Colorado
- The Hawk Eye – Burlington, Iowa
- Hayward Daily Review – Hayward, California
- Honolulu Star-Bulletin – Honolulu, Hawaii
- The Houston Chronicle – Houston, Texas
- Idaho Statesman – Boise, Idaho
- The Joplin Globe – Joplin, Missouri
- Kansas City Star – Kansas City, Missouri
- La Opinión – Los Angeles, California
- Las Cruces Sun-News – Las Cruces, New Mexico
- Las Vegas Sun – Las Vegas, Nevada
- Lexington Herald-Leader – Lexington, Kentucky
- Long Beach Press Telegram – Long Beach, California
- Los Angeles Daily News – Los Angeles, California
- Los Angeles Times – Los Angeles, California
- Lufkin Daily News – Lufkin, Texas
- Mail Tribune – Medford, Oregon
- Marin Independent Journal – Marin County, California
- Mason City Globe-Gazette – Mason City, Iowa
- Miami Herald – Miami, Florida
- Michigan Chronicle – Detroit, Michigan
- The Monterey County Herald – Monterey, California
- Muskegon Chronicle – Muskegon, Michigan
- Naples Daily News – Naples, Florida
- Nashua Telegraph – Nashua, New Hampshire
- The New Bedford Standard-Times – Massachusetts
- New York Daily News – New York City
- New York Times – New York City
- News and Observer – Raleigh, North Carolina
- Oakland Tribune – Oakland, California
- The Olympian – Olympia, Washington
- The Oregonian – Portland, Oregon
- Orlando Sentinel – Orlando, Florida
- Ouray Plaindealer – Ouray, Colorado
- Palladium-Item – Richmond, Indiana
- Palm Beach Post – Palm Beach, Florida
- Pasadena Star News – Pasadena, California
- Philadelphia Inquirer – Philadelphia, Pennsylvania
- The Pittsburgh Post-Gazette – Pittsburgh, Pennsylvania
- The Plain Dealer – Cleveland, Ohio
- Quad-City Times – the Quad Cities, Iowa and Illinois
- The Record – Stockton, California
- Register-Guard – Eugene, Oregon
- The Reno Gazette-Journal Reno, Nevada
- Rockford Register Star – Rockford, Illinois
- The Sacramento Bee – Sacramento, California
- The Salt Lake Tribune – Salt Lake City, Utah
- San Bernardino County Sun – San Bernardino, California
- San Francisco Chronicle – San Francisco, California
- San Gabriel Valley Tribune – San Gabriel, California
- San Joaquin Herald – San Joaquin County, California
- San Jose Mercury News – San Jose, California
- San Mateo County Times – San Mateo County, California
- Santa Cruz Sentinel – Santa Cruz, California
- Santa Fe New Mexican – Santa Fe, New Mexico
- Santa Monica Mirror – Santa Monica, California
- Sarasota Herald Tribune – Sarasota, Florida
- Seattle Post-Intelligencer – Seattle, Washington
- The Seattle Times – Seattle, Washington
- Springfield News Sun – Springfield, Ohio
- St. Cloud Times – St. Cloud, Minnesota
- St. Louis Post-Dispatch – St. Louis, Missouri
- St. Petersburg Times – St. Petersburg, Florida
- Standard-Times – Portland, Maine
- The Star-News – Wilmington, North Carolina
- Statesman Journal – Salem, Oregon
- Stockton Record – Stockton, California
- Storm Lake Times – Storm Lake, Iowa
- The Tennessean – Nashville, Tennessee
- Times-Reporter – Dover, Ohio
- Toledo Blade – Toledo, Ohio
- The Tri-City Herald – Kennewick, Washington
- Tri-Valley Herald – Pleasanton, California
- Tuscaloosa News – Tuscaloosa, Alabama
- Walla Walla Union-Bulletin – Walla Walla, Washington
- Walnut Creek Journal – Walnut Creek, California
- The Washington Post – Washington, D.C.
- The Wisconsin State Journal – Wisconsin
- Yakima Herald-Republic – Yakima, Washington

=== Magazines ===
- Condé Nast Portfolio
- Esquire
- The New Yorker – New York City, New York
- VIBE

== Academics ==
=== Economists ===
- Jared Bernstein, Economic Policy Institute labor economist
- J. Bradford DeLong, professor at the University of California, Berkeley; macroeconomist
- Ray Fair, professor at Yale School of Management; macroeconomist
- David D. Friedman
- Jason Furman
- Paul Krugman, professor and author, 2008 Nobel laureate
- Daniel McFadden, 2000 Nobel laureate
- Laurence H. Meyer, Federal Reserve Governor 1996–2002
- Edmund Phelps, 2006 Nobel laureate
- Amartya Sen, 1998 Nobel laureate
- Robert Solow, 1987 Nobel laureate
- Joseph E. Stiglitz, 2001 Nobel laureate

=== Scientists ===
- Alexei Abrikosov (Nobel Laureate Physics 2003)
- Peter Agre, Nobel Prize-winning scientist (Chemistry 2003)
- Sidney Altman (Nobel Laureate Chemistry 1989)
- Philip W. Anderson (Nobel Laureate Physics 1977)
- Richard Axel (Nobel Laureate Medicine 2004)
- David Baltimore (Nobel Laureate Medicine 1975)
- Baruj Benacerraf (Nobel Laureate Medicine 1980)
- Paul Berg (Nobel Laureate Chemistry 1980)
- J. Michael Bishop (Nobel Laureate Medicine 1989)
- Nicolaas Bloembergen (Nobel Laureate Physics 1981)
- Michael S. Brown (Nobel Laureate Medicine 1985)
- Linda B. Buck (Nobel Laureate Medicine 2004)
- Mario R. Capecchi (Nobel Laureate Medicine 2007)
- Martin Chalfie (Nobel Laureate Chemistry 2008)
- Stanley Cohen (Nobel Laureate Medicine 1986)
- Leon Cooper (Nobel Laureate Physics 1972)
- James W. Cronin (Nobel Laureate Physics 1980)
- Robert F. Curl (Nobel Laureate Chemistry 1996)
- Johann Deisenhofer (Nobel Laureate Chemistry 1988)
- John B. Fenn (Nobel Laureate Chemistry 2002)
- Edmond H. Fischer (Nobel Laureate Medicine 1992)
- Val Fitch (Nobel Laureate Physics 1980)
- Jerome I. Friedman (Nobel Laureate Physics 1990)
- Riccardo Giacconi (Nobel Laureate Physics 2002)
- Walter Gilbert (Nobel Laureate Chemistry 1980)
- Alfred G. Gilman (Nobel Laureate Medicine 1994)
- Donald A. Glaser (Nobel Laureate Physics 1960)
- Sheldon Glashow (Nobel Laureate Physics 1979)
- Joseph Goldstein (Nobel Laureate Medicine 1985)
- Paul Greengard (Nobel Laureate Medicine 2000)
- David Gross (Nobel Laureate Physics 2004)
- Robert H. Grubbs (Nobel Laureate Chemistry 2005)
- Roger Guillemin (Nobel Laureate Medicine 1977)
- John L. Hall (Nobel Laureate Physics 2005)
- Leland H. Hartwell (Nobel Laureate Medicine 2001)
- Dudley Herschbach (Nobel Laureate Chemistry 1986)
- Roald Hoffmann (Nobel Laureate Chemistry 1981)
- H. Robert Horvitz (Nobel Laureate Medicine 2002)
- Louis Ignarro (Nobel Laureate Medicine 1998)
- Eric R. Kandel (Nobel Laureate Medicine 2000)
- Walter Kohn (Nobel Laureate Chemistry 1998)
- Roger Kornberg (Nobel Laureate Chemistry 2006)
- Leon M. Lederman (Nobel Laureate Physics 1988)
- Sharon Long, former dean of Stanford University's School of Humanities & Science
- Craig C. Mello (Nobel Laureate Medicine 2006)
- Marshall Nirenberg (Nobel Laureate Medicine 1968)
- Peter Norvig (Director of Research, Google)
- Gilbert Omenn, professor of internal medicine, human genetics and public health at the University of Michigan
- Douglas D. Osheroff (Nobel Laureate Physics 1996)
- Stanley B. Prusiner (Nobel Laureate Medicine 1997)
- Norman F. Ramsey (Nobel Laureate Physics 1989)
- Robert Coleman Richardson (Nobel Laureate Physics 1996)
- Burton Richter (Nobel Laureate Physics 1976)
- Sally Ride, physicist, former NASA astronaut, first American woman in space
- Sherwood Rowland (Nobel Laureate Chemistry 1995)
- Richard Schrock (Nobel Laureate Chemistry 2005)
- Oliver Smithies (Nobel Laureate Medicine 2007)
- Joseph H. Taylor Jr. (Nobel Laureate Physics 1993)
- E. Donnall Thomas (Nobel Laureate Medicine 1990)
- Charles H. Townes (Nobel Laureate Physics 1964)
- Daniel C. Tsui (Nobel Laureate Physics 1998)
- Harold Varmus, Nobel Prize-winning scientist (Medicine 1989)
- James D. Watson (Nobel Laureate Medicine1962)
- Eric Wieschaus (Nobel Laureate Medicine 1995)
- Frank Wilczek (Nobel Laureate Physics 2004)
- Robert W. Wilson (Nobel Laureate Physics 1978)

=== Other academics ===
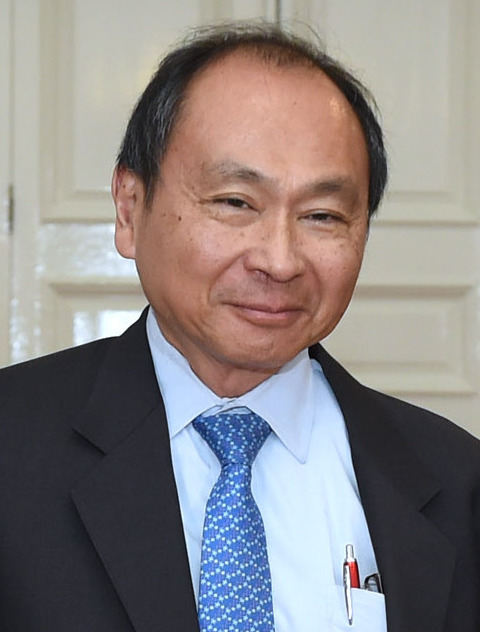
Francis Fukuyama

- Stephen B. Burbank, Professor of Law at the University of Pennsylvania
- Ronald Dworkin, Professor of Law and Political Philosophy at New York University
- **Michael Eric Dyson**, professor at Georgetown University
- John Hope Franklin, past president of the American Historical Association, Professor Emeritus of History at Duke University, chairman of President Bill Clinton's Initiative on Race in 1999, awarded the Presidential Medal of Freedom in 1995
- **Francis Fukuyama**, Professor of International Political Economy at Johns Hopkins University
- William R. Harvey, president, Hampton University
- Alice Kessler-Harris, R. Gordon Hoxie Professor of American History at Columbia University
- Scott Kurashige, associate professor of American Culture, History, and Asian/Pacific Islander American Studies at the University of Michigan
- **Lawrence Lessig**, professor at Stanford Law School
- Manning Marable, Professor of Public Affairs, History and African-American Studies at Columbia University
- Michael McFaul, Professor of Political Science at Stanford University
- Michael Nacht, Dean of Goldman School of Public Policy at the University of California at Berkeley
- Martha Nussbaum, Professor of Law and Ethics at the University of Chicago
- Michael Oppenheimer, Albert G. Milbank Professor of Geosciences and International Affairs, Woodrow Wilson School and Department of Geosciences, Princeton University
- Frances Fox Piven, professor of political science and sociology at the Graduate Center at the City University of New York
- Samantha Power, professor at Harvard University and Pulitzer Prize-winner
- Anita Ramasastry, professor of law at the University of Washington School of Law
- Riordan Roett, Professor of Western Hemisphere Studies and the Latin American Studies Program of Paul H. Nitze School of Advanced International Studies at Johns Hopkins University
- Barnett Rubin, Director of Studies and Senior Fellow of Center on International Cooperation at the New York University
- Simon Schama, professor of history and art history at Columbia University
- Laurence Tribe, professor of constitutional law at Harvard Law School
- Edward Tufte, Professor Emeritus of Statistics at Yale University
- David G. Victor, professor at Stanford Law School
- Celeste Wallander, professor at Georgetown University
- Barbara Weinstein, president of the American Historical Association (2007)
- Cornel West, Professor of Religion at Princeton University
- B. Joseph White, president, University of Illinois

== Business people ==
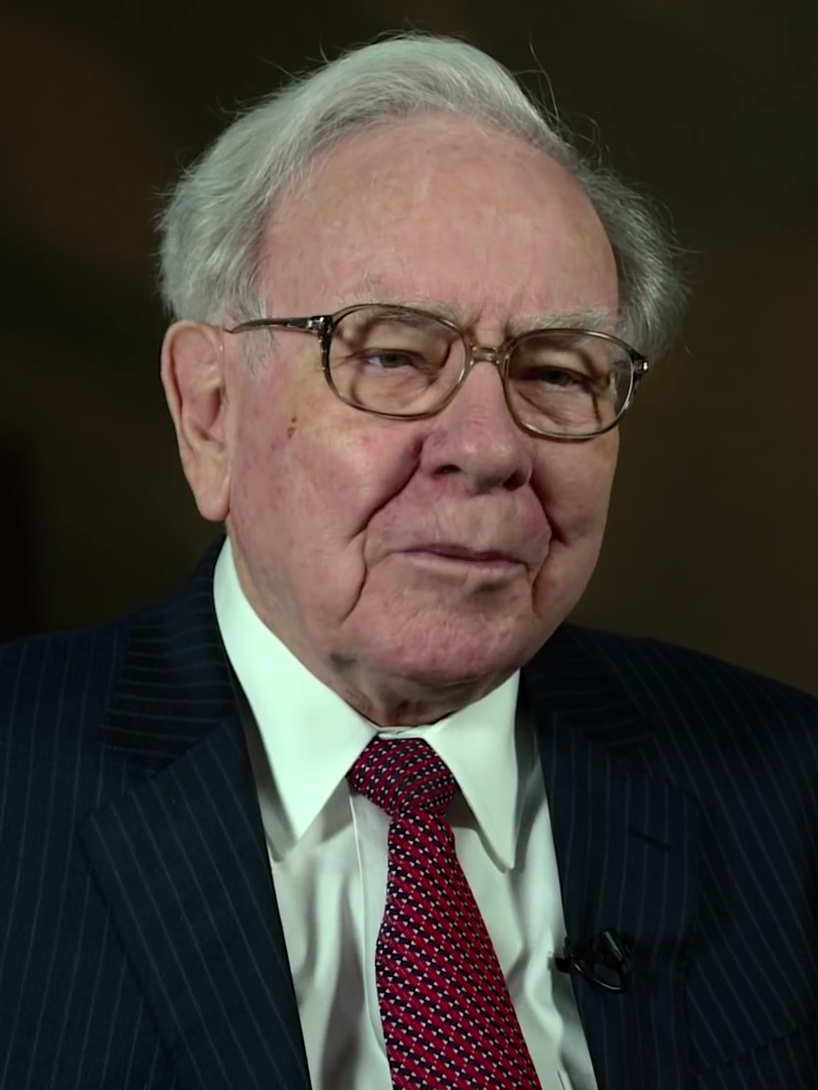
Warren Buffett

- **Marc Andreessen**, software engineer, Silicon Valley entrepreneur and co-founder of Netscape
- Michael Arrington, founder and co-editor of blog TechCrunch
- **Warren Buffett**, investor and the seventh richest man in the world
- Ben Cohen and Jerry Greenfield, co-founders of Ben & Jerry's
- Mohamed A. El-Erian, CEO and co-CIO of PIMCO
- David Geffen, media executive, producer and philanthropist
- Gary Hirshberg, chairman, president, and CEO of Stonyfield Farm
- Chris Hughes, co-founder of Facebook
- Jessica Jackley Flannery, co-founder of Kiva
- Sheila Johnson, co-founder of Black Entertainment Television
- **Jeffrey Katzenberg**, film producer and CEO of DreamWorks Animation
- Billy King, former general manager and team president of NBA team Philadelphia 76ers
- Ned Lamont, founder of Lamont Digital Systems and former Senate candidate
- Brink Lindsey, Vice President of Research for the Cato Institute and editor of Cato Unbound
- William Louis-Dreyfus, billionaire New York financier
- Ken Mok, president of 10 × 10 Entertainment
- Elisabeth Murdoch, daughter of Rupert Murdoch; chairman and CEO of Shine Limited
- Craig Newmark, founder of Craigslist
- Indra Nooyi, CEO of PepsiCo
- Pierre Omidyar, founder/chairman of the eBay auction site
- Dan Rooney, owner of the Pittsburgh Steelers of the NFL
- Hilary Rosen, on-air political and business analyst
- Eric Schmidt, Google chairman and CEO
- Alan Solomont, Massachusetts philanthropist and fund-raiser
- George Soros, businessman and philanthropist
- Leigh Steinberg, sports agent
- John W. Thompson, CEO of Symantec
- Billy Vassiliadis, CEO of R&R Partners

== Fashion designers ==
- American Apparel, T-shirt manufacturer
- Tory Burch
- Maria Cornejo, New York City-based Chilean designer
- Costello Tagliapietra, Brooklyn-based dressmakers
- Marc Jacobs
- Juicy Couture
- Derek Lam
- Nanette Lepore
- Isaac Mizrahi
- Charles Nolan
- Zac Posen
- Proenza Schouler
- Rag & Bone, New York City-based British designers
- Tracy Reese
- Narciso Rodriguez
- Rachel Roy
- Diane von Fürstenberg
- Alexander Wang

== Labor unions ==
- American Federation of Government Employees
- American Federation of Labor and Congress of Industrial Organizations
- American Federation of State, County and Municipal Employees (national, Illinois, Oregon, and Pennsylvania)
- American Federation of Teachers
- American Nurses Association
- American Postal Workers Union
- American Small Business League
- Association of Flight Attendants
- Brotherhood of Locomotive Engineers
- Change to Win Federation
- Culinary Workers Union Local 226
- Illinois Education Association
- International Association of Fire Fighters
- International Association of Machinists and Aerospace Workers
- International Brotherhood of Boilermakers, Iron Ship Builders, Blacksmiths, Forgers and Helpers
- International Brotherhood of Electrical Workers
- International Brotherhood of Teamsters
- International Federation of Professional and Technical Engineers
- International Union of Painters and Allied Trades
- National Air Traffic Controllers Association
- National Association of Letter Carriers
- National Education Association
- New York City Corrections Officers' Union
- Service Employees International Union (national, California, Illinois, Indiana, Kansas, Missouri, Nevada, Washington, Wisconsin)
- Transport Workers Union
- UNITE HERE
- United American Nurses
- United Association of Journeymen and Apprentices of the Plumbing, Pipefitting and Sprinkler Fitting Industry of the United States and Canada
- United Auto Workers Union (national, Region 4)
- United Food and Commercial Workers (national, southeast, northeast and central Pennsylvania, northeast Maryland and southern New York)
- United Healthcare Workers West
- United Mine Workers
- United Steelworkers
- Utility Workers Union of America

== Labor leaders and union officials ==
- Larry Cohen, president of Communications Workers of America
- Maria Elena Durazo, Executive secretary–treasurer of the Los Angeles County Federation of Labor
- Michael Thurmond, Georgia State Labor Commissioner
- Randi Weingarten, president of the American Federation of Teachers and the United Federation of Teachers

== Social and political activists ==
- Joan Baez, singer, peace and human rights activist
- Rev. Claude Black Jr., civil and human rights activist
- Cecil Bothwell, author, independent journalist, and "green builder"
- Eve Ensler
- Shepard Fairey, street artist and activist
- Louis Farrakhan, National Representative for the Nation of Islam
- Jane Fonda, actress and political activist
- Kim Gandy, feminist activist and president of the National Organization for Women
- Tom Hayden, anti-war activist, former California State Senator
- Jesse Jackson, former Democratic presidential candidate and former shadow Senator from the District of Columbia
- Joseph Lowery, minister and leader in the American civil rights movement
- Kate Michelman, pro-choice activist, former head of NARAL
- John Prendergast, human rights activist and former adviser to the White House and the State Department
- Michael Ratner, human rights lawyer, president of the Center for Constitutional Rights
- Rusty Schweickart, space advocate, co-founder of Association of Space Explorers, and Apollo 9 astronaut
- Eleanor Smeal, feminist activist and the President and founder of the Feminist Majority Foundation
- Linus Torvalds, founder of Linux and open-source activist
- Naomi Wolf, co-founder, American Freedom Campaign

== Organizations ==
=== Environmental organizations, humane organizations, and wildlife groups ===
- Environment America (national, New Hampshire, New Jersey, New Mexico, Pennsylvania, Texas)
- League of Conservation Voters
- Sierra Club

=== Other organizations ===
- American Coalition of Fathers and Children
- American Hunters and Shooters Association
- Cook County Democratic Party
- Democratic Party of Illinois
- Democratic Socialists of America
- EMILY's List
- Houston GLBT Political Caucus
- Human Rights Campaign
- Mexican American Political Association
- MoveOn.org
- NARAL Pro-Choice America
- National Association of Police Organizations
- Pirate Party of the United States

== Native American tribes ==
- Crow Nation
- Fort Peck Indian Reservation
- Navajo Nation

== Entertainers and artists ==
=== Actors and actresses ===
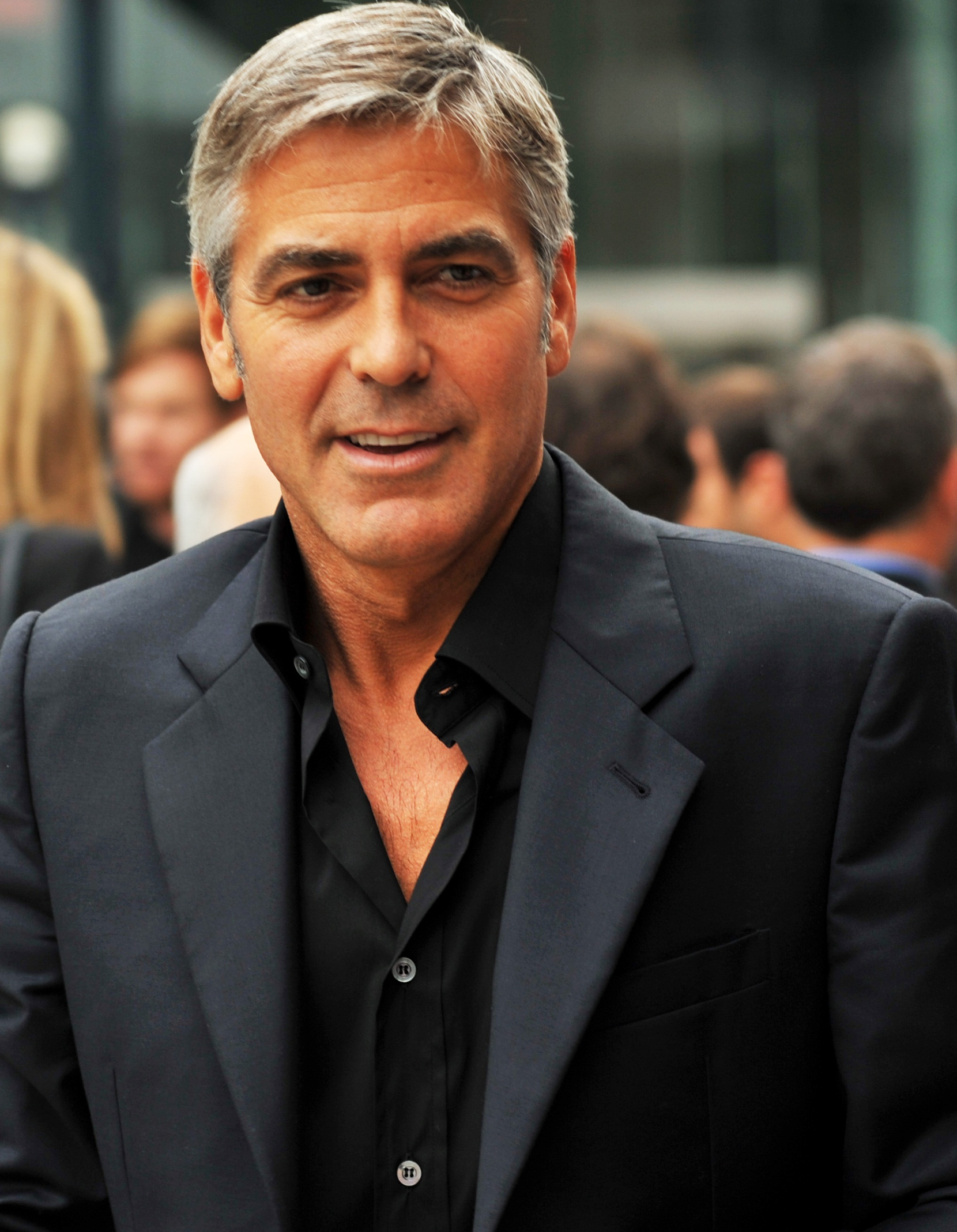
George Clooney

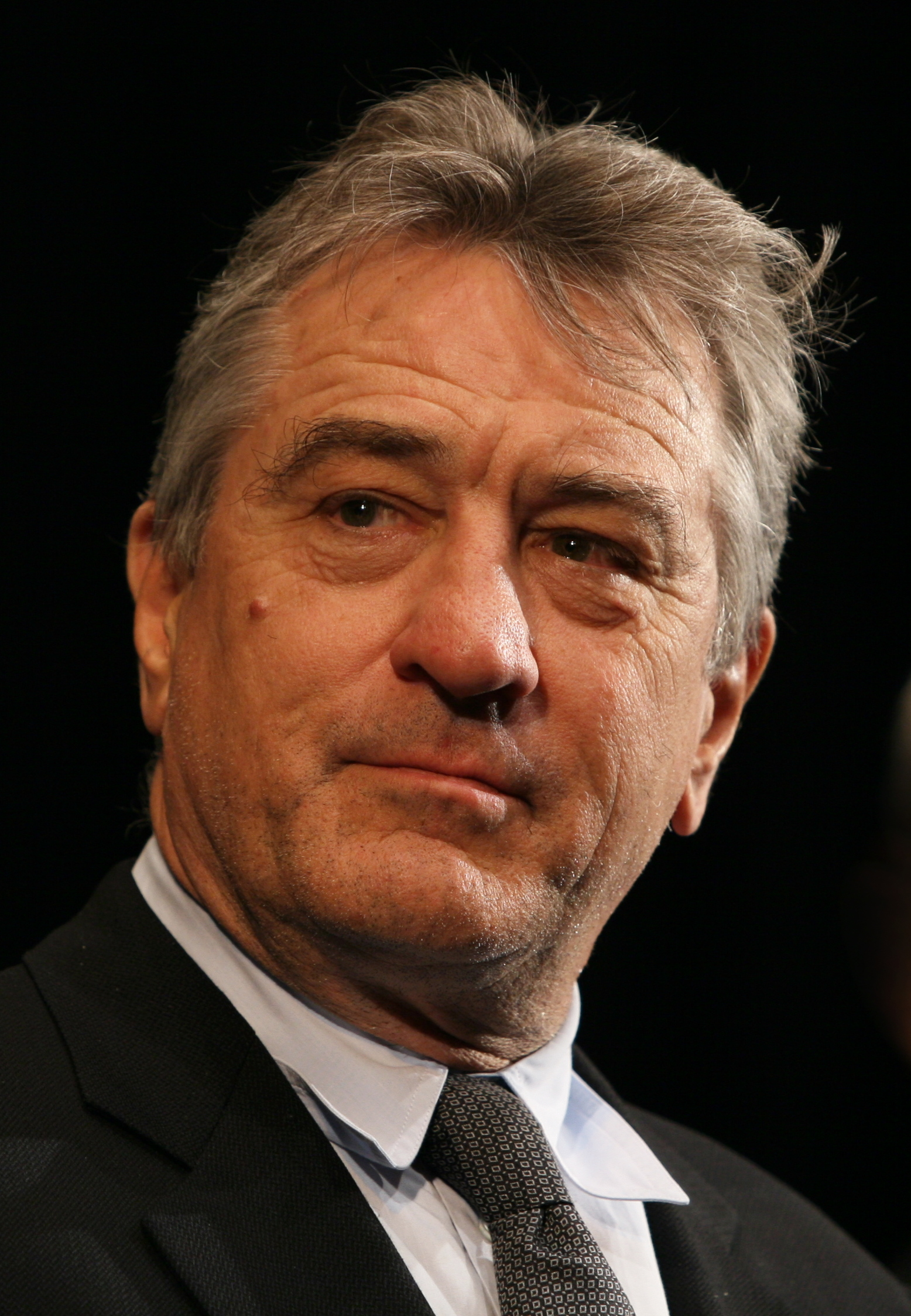
Robert De Niro

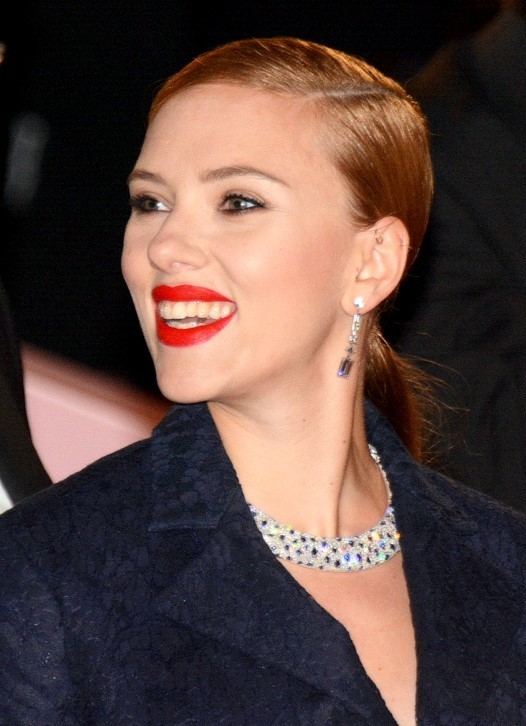
Scarlett Johansson

- Ben Affleck
- Shohreh Aghdashloo
- Jessica Alba
- Jennifer Aniston
- David Arquette
- Penn Badgley
- Alec Baldwin
- Eric Balfour
- Antonio Banderas
- Elizabeth Banks
- Drew Barrymore
- Noah Bean
- Kristen Bell
- Maria Bello
- Halle Berry
- Jessica Biel
- Jack Black
- Josh Brolin
- Pierce Brosnan
- Ellen Burstyn
- Sophia Bush
- Nick Cannon
- Justin Chambers
- Don Cheadle
- Kristin Chenoweth
- John Cleese
- **George Clooney**
- James Corden
- Bill Cosby
- Kevin Costner
- Courteney Cox-Arquette
- Daniel Craig
- Chris Crocker
- James Cromwell
- Alan Cumming
- Jamie Lee Curtis
- Tim Daly
- Matt Damon
- Ted Danson
- Larry David
- Rosario Dawson
- **Robert De Niro**
- Laura Dern
- Zooey Deschanel
- Danny DeVito
- Cameron Diaz
- Taye Diggs
- Fran Drescher
- Kirsten Dunst
- Megalyn Echikunwoke
- Aaron Eckhart
- Idris Elba
- Tracee Ellis Ross
- Isla Fisher
- Kate Flannery
- Jodie Foster
- Jamie Foxx
- Morgan Freeman
- Jennifer Garner
- Danny Glover
- Joseph Gordon-Levitt
- Topher Grace
- Bryan Greenberg
- Andre Gregory
- Adrian Grenier
- Andy Griffith
- Melanie Griffith
- Jasmine Guy
- Luis Guzmán
- Mark Hamill
- Josh Hamilton
- Tom Hanks
- Hill Harper
- Valerie Harper
- Anne Hathaway
- Dennis Haysbert
- Dulé Hill
- Gary Holt
- Dennis Hopper
- Kelly Hu
- Jennifer Hudson
- Kate Hudson
- Josh Hutcherson
- Samuel L. Jackson
- **Scarlett Johansson**
- Angelina Jolie
- Rashida Jones
- Ashley Judd
- Daniel Dae Kim
- Regina King
- Christopher Knight
- Michael Kostroff
- Ashton Kutcher
- Ken Leung
- Lucy Liu
- Blake Lively
- Nia Long
- Eva Longoria
- George Lopez
- Julia Louis-Dreyfus
- Josh Lucas
- Tobey Maguire
- James Marsters
- Rue McClanahan
- Benjamin McKenzie
- Anne Meara
- Alyssa Milano
- Demi Moore
- Julianne Moore
- Enrique Murciano
- Eddie Murphy
- Mike Ness
- Thandie Newton
- Cynthia Nixon
- Amaury Nolasco
- Edward Norton
- Ed O'Neill
- Gwyneth Paltrow
- Hayden Panettiere
- Sarah Jessica Parker
- Mario Van Peebles
- Amanda Peet
- Kal Penn
- Sean Penn
- Harold Perrineau
- Ryan Phillippe
- Chris Pine
- Jada Pinkett Smith
- Brad Pitt
- Jeremy Piven
- Sidney Poitier
- Ellen Pompeo
- Natalie Portman
- Jaime Pressly
- Queen Latifah
- Zachary Quinto
- Carl Reiner
- Ryan Reynolds
- Nicole Richie
- Chris Rock
- Adam Rodriguez
- Brandon Routh
- Paul Rudd
- Susan Sarandon
- Johnathon Schaech
- Richard Schiff
- Martin Sheen
- Alicia Silverstone
- Will Smith
- Phil Spector
- Lexington Steele
- Mary Steenburgen
- Ben Stiller
- Jerry Stiller
- Meryl Streep
- Rider Strong
- Donald Sutherland
- Cary-Hiroyuki Tagawa
- Charlize Theron
- Marisa Tomei
- Kathleen Turner
- Wilmer Valderrama
- Amber Valletta
- Kate Walsh
- Denzel Washington
- Isaiah Washington
- Wil Wheaton
- Forest Whitaker
- Bradley Whitford
- James Whitmore
- Olivia Wilde
- Gene Wilder
- Henry Winkler
- Alfre Woodard
- Daniel Wu
- Renée Zellweger

=== Comedians ===
- Aziz Ansari
- Russell Brand
- Margaret Cho
- Will Ferrell
- Larry Gelbart
- Kathy Griffin
- Chelsea Handler
- John Leguizamo
- Richard Lewis
- Bill Maher
- Lorne Michaels
- Eugene Mirman
- Tracy Morgan
- Sarah Silverman
- Hal Sparks
- Doug Stanhope
- Stella (Michael Ian Black, Michael Showalter, David Wain)
- Jon Stewart, host of The Daily Show
- Wanda Sykes
- Lizz Winstead, co-creator of The Daily Show

=== Directors ===
- J. J. Abrams
- Lexi Alexander
- Woody Allen
- David Benioff
- Ken Burns
- Eric Byler
- Jesse Dylan
- William Friedkin
- Todd Haynes
- Ron Howard
- Callie Khouri
- Spike Lee
- George Lucas
- David Lynch
- James Mangold
- Garry Marshall
- Michael Moore
- Rob Reiner
- John Sayles
- M. Night Shyamalan
- Steven Spielberg
- Oliver Stone
- Quentin Tarantino
- Boaz Yakin

=== Models ===
- Cindy Crawford
- Adrianne Curry
- Heidi Klum

=== Musicians ===
- 50 Cent
- Tom Araya
- Arcade Fire
- Billie Joe Armstrong
- Burt Bacharach
- Jon Bauman
- Beastie Boys
- Beyoncé
- Big Kenny
- Andrew Bird
- Biz Markie
- The Black Keys
- Black Thought of The Roots
- The Breeders
- Melanie Brown
- Carrie Brownstein, guitarist for Sleater-Kinney
- Jimmy Buffett
- Win Butler
- Nick Cannon
- Mariah Carey
- Chris Carrabba
- Clap Your Hands Say Yeah
- Kelly Clarkson
- Cold War Kids
- Natalie Cole
- Sean Combs
- Common
- Harry Connick Jr.
- Chris Cornell
- David Coverdale
- David Crosby
- Sheryl Crow
- The Decemberists
- Tom DeLonge
- Devo
- Dennis DeYoung
- Dianogah
- Celine Dion
- DJ Z-Trip
- David Draiman
- Bob Dylan
- Eminem
- Melissa Etheridge
- Fergie
- The Fiery Furnaces
- Flea of the Red Hot Chili Peppers
- John Flansburgh of They Might Be Giants
- Robb Flynn
- David Foster
- Jay Jay French, guitarist for Twisted Sister
- Ben Gibbard of Death Cab for Cutie
- Goo Goo Dolls
- Kim Gordon
- Macy Gray
- Sammy Hagar
- Merle Haggard
- Herbie Hancock
- Ben Harper
- Mickey Hart, Phil Lesh and Bob Weir of the Grateful Dead (Deadheads for Obama)
- Faith Hill
- Jennifer Hudson
- Scott Ian
- Jim James of My Morning Jacket
- Jay Red Eagle
- Jay-Z
- Stephan Jenkins
- Jin
- Billy Joel
- Alicia Keys
- Carole King
- Glenn Kotche of Wilco
- Ed Kowalczyk
- Kris Kristofferson
- Amel Larrieux
- Cyndi Lauper
- John Legend
- Annie Lennox
- Les Savy Fav
- Phil Lesh of the Grateful Dead (Deadheads for Obama)
- Adam Levine of Maroon 5
- Jenny Lewis
- John Linnell of They Might Be Giants
- Ludacris
- Joel Madden of Good Charlotte
- Chris Martin of Coldplay
- Master P
- Dave Matthews
- Michael McDonald
- Tim McGraw
- Duff Mckagan
- John Mellencamp
- Mos Def
- Nada Surf
- Nas
- Graham Nash
- The National
- Ne-Yo
- Joanna Newsom
- No Age
- Conor Oberst
- OK Go
- Don Omar
- Pearl Jam
- Q-Tip
- Questlove of The Roots
- R.E.M.
- Rhymefest
- Johnathan Rice
- Nile Rodgers
- Henry Rollins
- Pat Sansone of Wilco
- Tom Scholz, guitarist of Boston
- Patti Scialfa
- Seal
- Shakira
- Otep Shamaya
- Shudder to Think
- Silversun Pickups
- Russell Simmons
- Ashlee Simpson
- Slash
- Patti Smith
- Dee Snider
- Jill Sobule
- Jeff Scott Soto
- Regina Spektor
- **Bruce Springsteen**
- Ralph Stanley
- Mavis Staples
- Michael Stipe
- Barbra Streisand
- Taboo
- James Taylor
- Tegan and Sara
- Tenacious D (Jack Black and Kyle Gass)
- TV on the Radio
- Jeff Tweedy of Wilco
- Usher
- Vampire Weekend
- Rufus Wainwright
- Chris Walla of Death Cab for Cutie
- Joan Wasser
- Bob Weir of the Grateful Dead (Deadheads for Obama)
- Pete Wentz
- Stevie Wonder
- Kanye West
- will.i.am
- Pharrell Williams

=== Television and radio personalities ===
- Perez Hilton
- Star Jones
- Kim Kardashian
- Yul Kwon
- Lisa Ling
- Michael Smerconish
- Howard Stern
- Emme Tomingbang
- **Oprah Winfrey**

== Writers ==
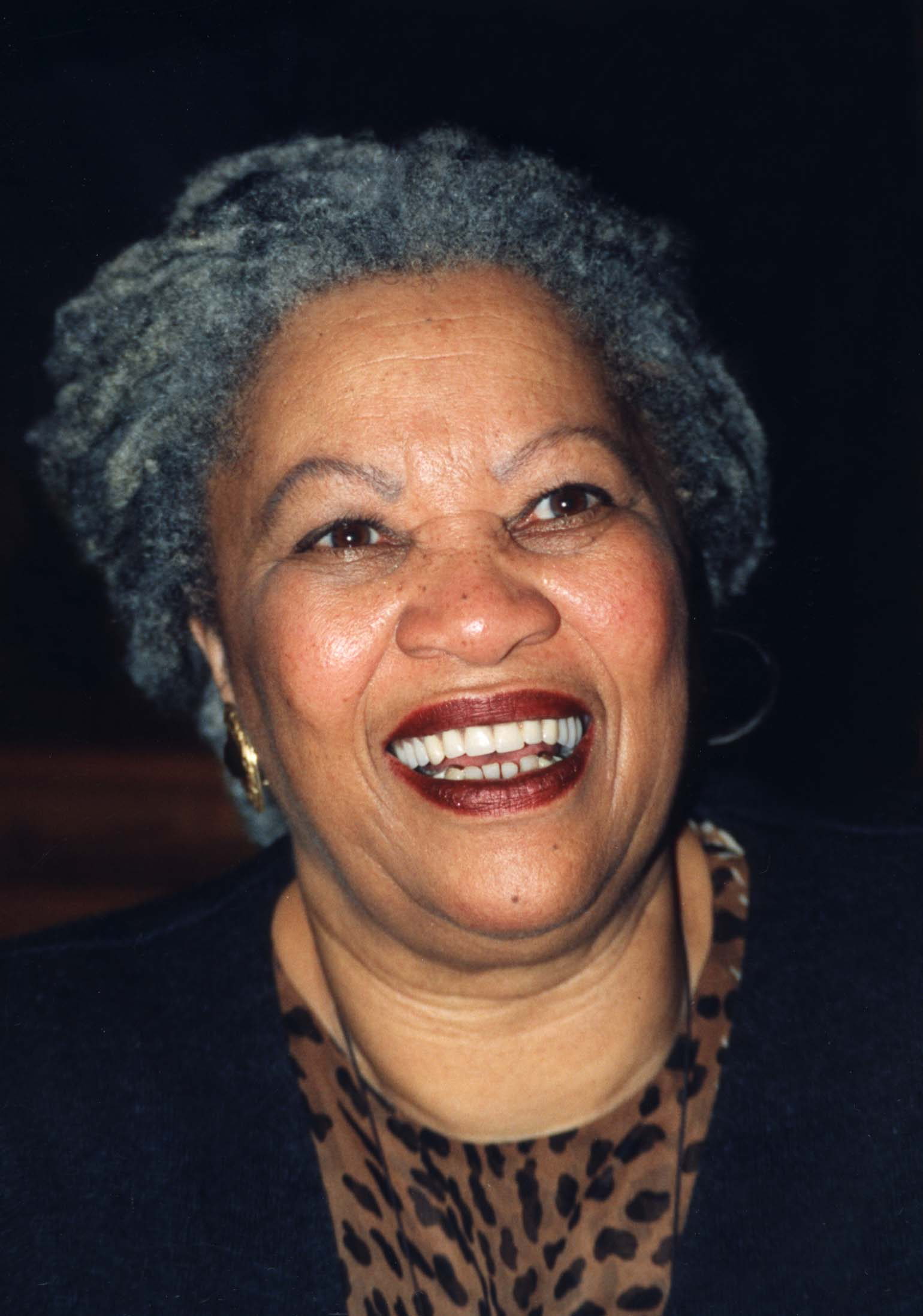
Toni Morrison

- Paul Auster
- Ronald Bailey
- Bruce Bartlett
- Judy Blume, popular children's and young adult writer, author of Are You There God? It's Me, Margaret., Superfudge, and others
- Christopher Buckley, conservative writer and satirist, son of William F. Buckley
- **Michael Chabon**
- Daniel Clowes
- **Dave Eggers**
- **Barbara Ehrenreich**, author, activist & non-profit executive
- Jonathan Safran Foer
- **Daniel Handler**, better known under the pen name Lemony Snicket
- **Jeffrey Hart**, columnist and former editor of the National Review
- Bob Herbert, columnist for The New York Times
- Christopher Hitchens, journalist, critic and author
- John Hodgman, actor and author of The Areas of My Expertise
- Khaled Hosseini, novelist and physician
- Jeanne Wakatsuki Houston
- Margo Jefferson, Pulitzer Prize–winning New York Times writer
- Miranda July, author of No One Belongs Here More Than You and director of Me And You And Everyone We Know
- Garrison Keillor, Grammy Award-winning author and radio personality
- Stephen King
- Maxine Hong Kingston
- John McWhorter, author
- David Mixner, writer and civil rights activist
- **Toni Morrison**, Nobel Prize winner and Pulitzer Prize recipient
- **Camille Paglia**, author
- Ann Patchett
- Katha Pollitt
- Richard Powers, novelist, National Book Award winner
- Philip Roth
- Michael Shermer
- Andrew Sullivan, political commentator
- Studs Terkel
- Andrew Tobias
- **Ayelet Waldman**
- Alice Walker
- Chris Ware
- Joss Whedon
- Jason Whitlock, sportswriter for the Kansas City Star
- Roger Wilkins, civil rights leader and journalist
- **Tobias Wolff**
- Sherman Yellen, playwright
- Fareed Zakaria

== Foreign writers ==
- Mark Millar, comic book writer, known for Wanted and The Ultimates
- J. K. Rowling, author of the Harry Potter series
- Eva Schloss, author and Holocaust survivor, stepsister of Anne Frank

== Athletes and sports ==
=== NBA basketball players ===
- Kareem Abdul-Jabbar
- Greg Anthony
- Charles Barkley
- Shane Battier
- Charlie Bell
- Chauncey Billups
- Baron Davis
- Chris Duhon
- Joe Dumars
- Evan Eschmeyer
- Steve Francis
- Grant Hill
- LeBron James
- Magic Johnson
- Michael Jordan
- Shawn Marion
- Joakim Noah
- Greg Oden
- Chris Paul
- Terry Porter
- Bill Walton
- Luke Walton

=== NFL football ===
- Jerome Bettis
- Jack Brewer
- Tony Dungy, NFL coach
- Donnie Edwards, linebacker
- Trent Edwards, quarterback
- Emmitt Smith
- Lovie Smith, NFL coach
- Rod Smith
- Pat White
- Roy Williams, wide receiver

=== Major League Baseball (MLB) ===
- Carl Crawford
- Cliff Floyd
- Jonny Gomes
- Darryl Hamilton
- Edwin Jackson
- Derrek Lee
- Fernando Perez
- David Price
- Jimmy Rollins
- B.J. Upton

=== Wrestlers and boxers ===
- Booker T
- Elijah Burke
- CM Punk
- Jim Cornette
- Mick Foley
- Hulk Hogan
- Dwayne Johnson
- Sugar Ray Leonard
- Kevin Nash

=== Others ===
- Pete Carroll, coach of the USC Trojans football team
- Ben Eager, NHL hockey player
- Junior Johnson, NASCAR Legend
- Shawn Johnson, gymnast and Olympic gold medalist
- Billie Jean King
- Billy Mills, Olympic gold medalist (10,000 meters)
- Craig Robinson, head coach, Obama's brother-in-law
- Diana Taurasi, WNBA basketball player

== Notable family members of political figures ==
- Jack Carter, Nevada politician, son of Jimmy Carter
- Kitty Dukakis, wife of 1988 Democratic nominee Michael Dukakis
- Julie Nixon Eisenhower, daughter of Richard Nixon and wife of grandson of Dwight D. Eisenhower
- Susan Eisenhower, granddaughter of former president Dwight D. Eisenhower
- **Caroline Kennedy**, daughter of John F. Kennedy
- Ethel Kennedy, widow of Robert F. Kennedy
- Joseph Kennedy III, son of Joseph Patrick Kennedy II and grandson of Robert F. Kennedy
- Max Kennedy, son of Robert F. Kennedy
- Rory Kennedy, daughter of Robert F. Kennedy, documentary filmmaker
- Stephanie Miller, host of The Stephanie Miller Show and the daughter of former Republican vice presidential candidate William E. Miller
- Christine Pelosi, member of DNC (superdelegate); daughter of the current Speaker of the United States House of Representatives Nancy Pelosi (D-CA)
- Dorothy Peterson, wife of former New Hampshire Governor and Republican Walter Peterson
- Ron Reagan, son of Ronald Reagan
- Maria Shriver, journalist, niece of John F. Kennedy, First Lady of California and wife of Arnold Schwarzenegger

== Other notable individuals ==
- Cliff Bleszinski, video game designer, creator of Gears of War
- Andy Bloch, poker player and former member of the MIT Blackjack Team
- Doyle Brunson, poker player
- Kirbyjon Caldwell, President George W. Bush's spiritual advisor
- James Carville, Clinton campaign strategist
- Tim Cavanaugh
- Jenny Durkan, chair of John Edwards' 2004 and 2008 presidential campaigns in Washington state
- Roger Ebert, Pulitzer Prize–winning film critic
- Myrlie Evers-Williams, former chairperson of National Association for the Advancement of Colored People, widow of murdered civil rights leader Medgar Evers
- Keemstar
- Don King, boxing promoter
- Harry Knowles, founder of Ain't It Cool News
- Tom Lehrer, political satirist
- Steven Pinker
- Ed Turlington, John Edwards' advisor
- David Weigel

== Foreign political figures ==
- Kurt Beck, Minister President of the German federal state of Rhineland-Palatinate (Rheinland-Pfalz), and former chairman of Germany's Social Democratic Party
- Wouter Bos, Minister of Finance and deputy prime minister of The Netherlands
- Gordon Brown, Prime Minister of the United Kingdom and the leader of the Labour Party
- Bertrand Delanoë, mayor of Paris, France and member of the French committee for Obama
- Patrick Devedjian, leader of the French political party Union for a Popular Movement
- Laurent Fabius, former prime minister of France
- George Galloway, British Respect Party MP for Bethnal Green and Bow
- Ralph Gonsalves, Prime Minister of Saint Vincent and the Grenadines
- Daniel Hannan, British Conservative party MEP for South East England
- François Hollande, former head of France's Socialist Party and former president of France
- Michael Ignatieff, Deputy Leader of the Liberal Party of Canada
- Boris Johnson, Mayor of London, former British Conservative Party Member of Parliament for Henley
- Andrés Manuel López Obrador, former Mexican presidential candidate and Mexican opposition leader
- Trevor Manuel, Minister of Finance of South Africa
- Daniel Ortega, president of Nicaragua
- Axel Poniatowski, president of the foreign affairs commission at the National Assembly of France.
- Fredrik Reinfeldt, Prime Minister of Sweden
- Ségolène Royal, former French Socialist presidential candidate
- Tulip Siddiq, British Labour Party politician
- Walter Veltroni, leader of the Italian opposition Democratic Party and former mayor of Rome
- Gough Whitlam, former prime minister of Australia

== See also ==
- Barack Obama 2008 presidential campaign
- Barack Obama 2012 presidential campaign
- List of Barack Obama 2012 presidential campaign endorsements
- Republican and conservative support for Barack Obama in 2008
- Joe Biden 2008 presidential campaign
- List of John McCain 2008 presidential campaign endorsements
- List of Hillary Clinton 2008 presidential campaign endorsements
- Congressional endorsements for the 2008 United States presidential election
- Newspaper endorsements in the 2008 United States presidential primaries
- List of superdelegates at the 2008 Democratic National Convention
