= Bay Area News Group =

California newspaper publisher

- Type: Private
- Industry: Media
- Founded: 2006
- Headquarters: San Jose, California, U.S.,
- Products: Newspaper; Online newspaper
- Owner: MediaNews Group
- Website: bayareanewsgroup.com

Bay Area News Group (BANG) is the largest publisher of daily and weekly newspapers in the San Francisco Bay Area, including its flagship The Mercury News. A subsidiary of the Denver-based MediaNews Group, its corporate headquarters is in San Jose, California, and publication offices in San Jose. Since 2010, MediaNews Group has been controlled by Alden Global Capital. Previously known as ANG (Alameda News Group), the name changed to Bay Area News Group in 2006 after the MediaNews Group bought The Mercury News and Contra Costa Times from McClatchy Co. Most production aspects have now moved to The Mercury News facilities in San Jose, California.

== Print ==
The company structure allows for the ability to share stories between its various newspapers, meaning one reporter can get the story for all the publications. Newspapers BANG publishes include:

- East Bay Times
- Marin Independent Journal
- The Mercury News
- Santa Cruz Sentinel
- Vallejo Times Herald
- Vacaville Reporter

== 2011 restructuring ==
On August 23, 2011, the company announced the reorganization of 11 of its newspapers, with shuttering of all of its East Bay nameplates under two new publications as of November 2, 2011. The planned merger and publication reorganization was modified in October 2011, when BANG decided to scrap plans to launch the East Bay Tribune and instead consolidate its East Bay newspapers under the Oakland Tribune name.

- The Oakland Tribune, Alameda Times-Star, Hayward Daily Review, Fremont Argus and West County Times were scheduled to publish their last editions on November 1, 2011. The following day, subscribers were to get copies of the new East Bay Tribune; instead the mastheads were made local editions of the Oakland Tribune.
- The Contra Costa Times, San Ramon Valley Times, East County Times, Tri-Valley Herald and San Joaquin Herald were scheduled to become the new The Times.
- The San Mateo Times was scheduled to publish its last issue on November 1, 2011. As of November 2, 2011, subscribers were to get localized versions of the San Jose Mercury News.

== 2016 restructuring ==
In March 2016, BANG announced it would further consolidate its newspapers (other than the Marin Independent Journal) down to two: The East Bay Times and The Mercury News, eliminating the Oakland Tribune and the other papers.
