= Human Rights Watch =

International non-governmental organization

- Founded: 1978; 48 years ago (as Helsinki Watch)
- Type: Nonprofit; NGO
- Purpose: Human rights, activism
- Headquarters: New York City, U.S.
- Region served: Worldwide
- Executive Director: Philippe Bolopion
- Revenue: $85 million (2025)
- Expenses: $102 million (2025)
- Endowment: $169 million (2025)
- Website: www.hrw.org

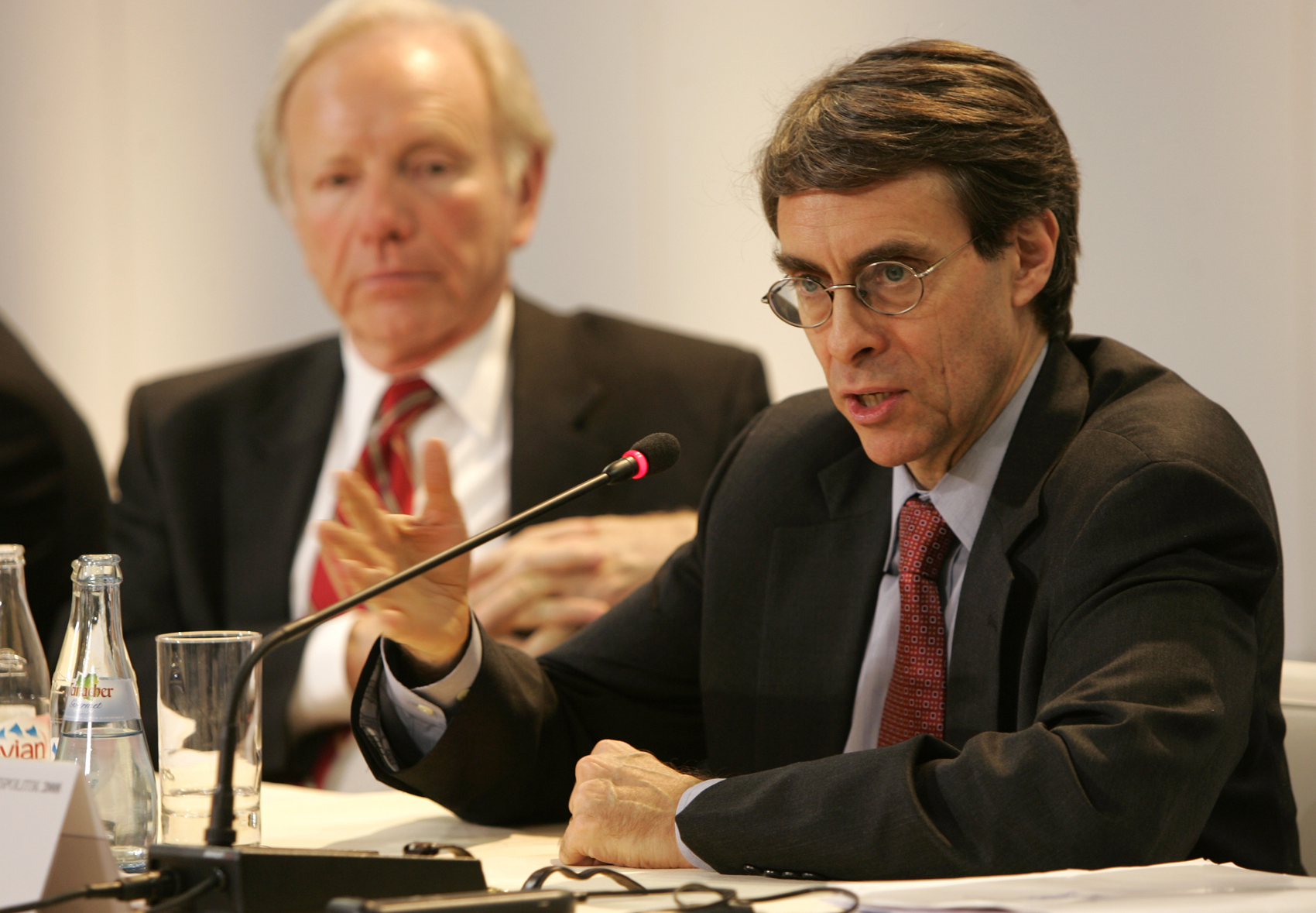
Former executive Director Kenneth Roth speaking at the 44th Munich Security Conference 2008

Human Rights Watch (HRW) is an international non-governmental watchdog organization, headquartered in New York City. HRW investigates and reports on human rights abuses, pressuring governments to respect human rights, and is active in nearly 100 countries.

The organization was founded in 1978 as Helsinki Watch, whose purpose was to monitor the Soviet Union's compliance with the 1975 Helsinki Accords. Its separate global divisions merged into Human Rights Watch in 1988.

== Organizational overview ==
=== History ===
Human Rights Watch was co-founded by Robert L. Bernstein, Jeri Laber, and Aryeh Neier as a private American NGO in 1978, under the name Helsinki Watch, to monitor the Soviet Union's compliance with the Helsinki Accords.

Asia Watch (1985), Africa Watch (1988), and Middle East Watch (1989) were added to what was known as "The Watch Committees". In 1988, these committees united under one umbrella to form Human Rights Watch.

In April 2021, HRW released a report accusing Israel of apartheid and calling on the International Criminal Court to investigate "systematic discrimination" against Palestinians, becoming the first major international rights NGO to do so.

In August 2020, the Chinese government sanctioned HRW executive director Kenneth Roth—along with the heads of four other U.S.-based democracy and human rights organizations and six U.S. Republican lawmakers—for supporting the Hong Kong pro-democracy movement in the 2019–20 Hong Kong protests. The five organizations' leaders saw the sanctioning, whose details were unspecified, as a tit-for-tat measure in response to the earlier U.S. sanctioning of 11 Hong Kong officials. The latter step, in turn, had been a reaction to the enactment of the Hong Kong National Security Law in June. In October 2021, The New York Times reported that HRW left Hong Kong as a result of the Chinese sanctions, with the situation in Hong Kong henceforth to be monitored by HRW's China team. The decision to leave came amid a wider crackdown on civil society groups in Hong Kong.

=== Activities ===
Pursuant to the Universal Declaration of Human Rights (UDHR), Human Rights Watch opposes violations of what the UDHR considers basic human rights. This includes capital punishment and discrimination on the basis of sexual orientation. HRW advocates freedoms in connection with fundamental human rights, such as freedom of religion and freedom of the press. It seeks to achieve change by publicly pressuring governments and their policymakers to curb human rights abuses, and by convincing more powerful governments to use their influence on governments that violate human rights.

Each year, Human Rights Watch presents the Human Rights Defenders Award to activists who demonstrate leadership and courage in defending human rights. The award winners work closely with HRW to investigate and expose human rights abuses.

Human Rights Watch is a founding member of the International Freedom of Expression Exchange.

Cuba, North Korea, Sudan, Iran, Israel, Egypt, the United Arab Emirates, Uzbekistan, and Venezuela are among the handful of countries that have blocked HRW staff members' access.

HRW's former executive director is Kenneth Roth, who held the position from 1993 to 2022. Roth conducted investigations on abuses in Poland after martial law was declared in 1981. He later focused on Haiti, which had just emerged from the Duvalier dictatorship but remained plagued by problems. Roth's awareness of the importance of human rights began with stories his father had told about escaping Nazi Germany in 1938. He graduated from Yale Law School and Brown University.

Tirana Hassan was the group's executive director from 2023 to February 2025.

=== Comparison with Amnesty International ===
Human Rights Watch and Amnesty International are both international non-governmental organizations headquartered in the North Atlantic Anglosphere that report on global human rights violations. The major differences lie in the groups' structures and methods for promoting change.

Amnesty International is a mass-membership organization. Mobilization of those members is the organization's central advocacy tool. Human Rights Watch's main products are its crisis-driven research and lengthy reports, whereas Amnesty International lobbies and writes detailed reports, and also focuses on mass letter-writing campaigns, adopting individuals as "prisoners of conscience" and lobbying for their release. HRW openly lobbies for specific actions for other governments to take against human rights offenders, including naming specific individuals for arrest, or sanctions to be levied against certain countries, such as calling for punitive sanctions against the top leaders in Sudan who oversaw a killing campaign in Darfur. The group also called for human rights activists who had been detained in Sudan to be released.

HRW's documentation of human rights abuses often includes extensive analyses of conflicts' political and historical backgrounds, some of which have been published in academic journals. AI's reports, on the other hand, tend to contain less analysis and instead focus on specific rights abuses.

In 2010, Jonathan Foreman wrote that HRW had "all but eclipsed" Amnesty International. According to Foreman, instead of being supported by a mass membership, as AI is, HRW depends on wealthy donors who like to see the organization's reports make headlines. For this reason, according to Foreman, it may be that organizations like HRW "concentrate too much on places that the media already cares about," especially Israel.

=== Funding ===
In 2010, financier George Soros of the Open Society Foundations announced his intention to grant $100 million to HRW over ten years to help it expand its efforts internationally. The donation, the largest in HRW's history, increased its operating staff of 300 by 120 people.

In 2020, HRW's board of directors discovered that HRW accepted a $470,000 donation from Saudi real estate magnate Mohamed Bin Issa Al Jaber, owner of a company HRW "had previously identified as complicit in labor rights abuse", under the condition that the donation not be used to support LGBT advocacy in the Middle East and North Africa. After The Intercept reported the donation, it was returned, and HRW issued a statement that accepting it was "deeply regrettable".

In 2025, HRW had total assets of $216.7 million.

=== Notable personnel ===
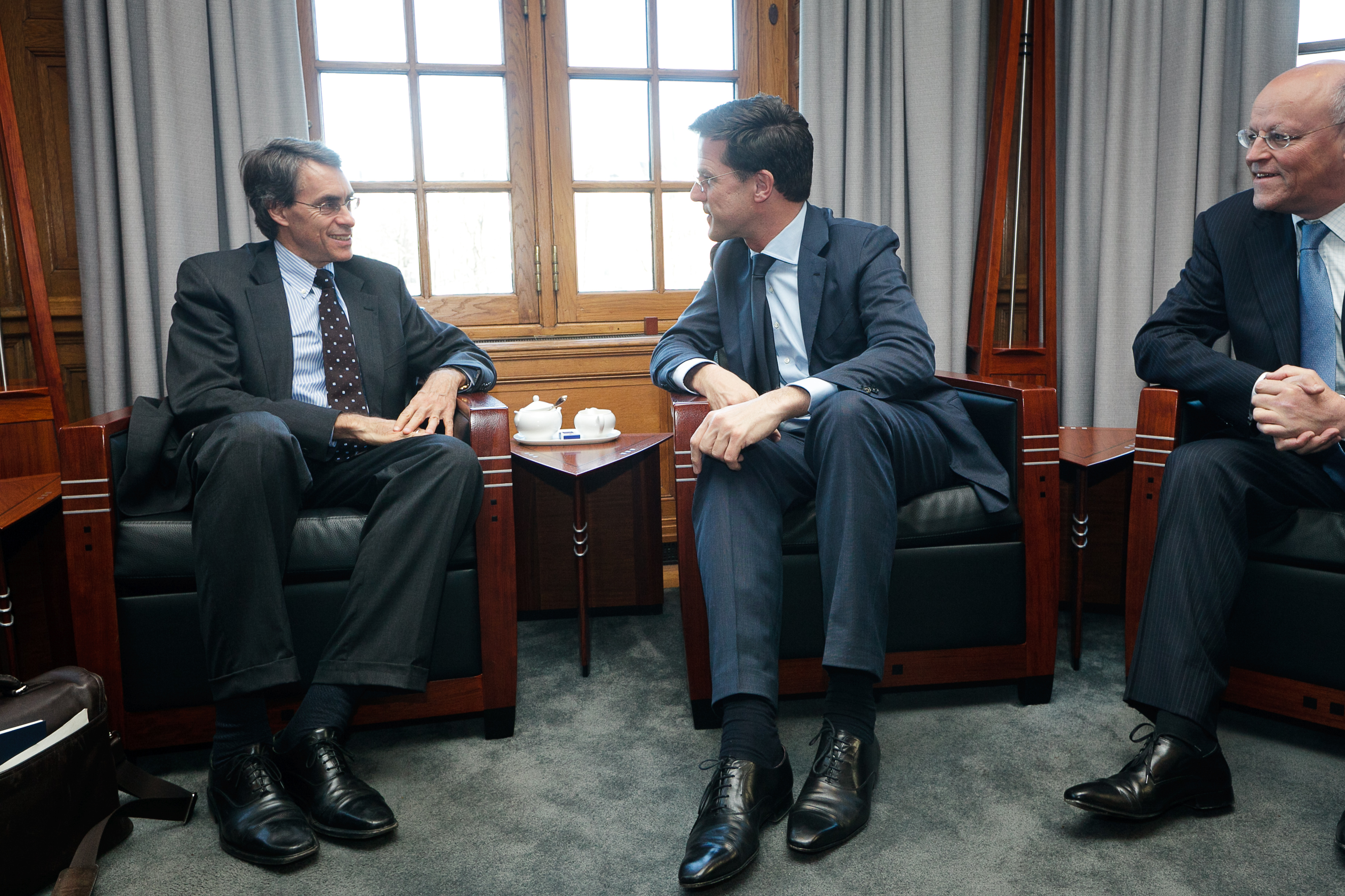
Kenneth Roth and the Prime Minister of the Netherlands, Mark Rutte, February 2, 2012

Notable current and former staff members of HRW include

- Neil Rimer, co-chair, board of directors
- John J. Studzinski, vice chair emeritus of the board of directors
- Marc Garlasco, former staff member, resigned due to a scandal involving his Nazi memorabilia collection
- Tejshree Thapa, former Senior South Asia researcher
- Habib Rahiab, former field researcher in Afghanistan and Pakistan

=== Publications ===
In the summer of 2004, the Rare Book and Manuscript Library at Columbia University in New York became the depository institution for the Human Rights Watch Archive, an active collection that documents decades of human rights investigations around the world. The archive was transferred from the Norlin Library at the University of Colorado, Boulder. It includes administrative files, public relations documents, and case and country files. With some exceptions for security considerations, the Columbia University community and the public have access to field notes, taped and transcribed interviews with alleged victims of human rights violations, video and audiotapes, and other materials documenting HRW's activities since its founding in 1978 as Helsinki Watch. Some parts of the HRW archive are not open to researchers or to the public, including the records of the meetings of the board of directors, the executive committee, and the various subcommittees, limiting historians' ability to understand the organization's internal decision-making.

== Criticism, bans and restrictions ==
HRW has been criticized by a number of observers. Its critics include the national governments it has investigated, the media, and its former chairman Robert L. Bernstein. The criticism generally falls into the category of alleged bias, frequently in response to critical HRW reports. Some sources allege HRW is biased against Israel in its coverage of the Israel–Palestine conflict. In 2026, HRW's Israel and Palestine director resigned after HRW blocked a report that argued that Israel's denial of the Palestinian right of return is a "crime against humanity".

In 2014, two Nobel Peace Laureates, Adolfo Pérez Esquivel and Mairead Maguire, wrote a letter signed by 100 other human rights activists and scholars criticizing HRW for its revolving-door hiring practices with the U.S. government, its failure to denounce the U.S. practice of extrajudicial rendition, its endorsement of the U.S. 2011 military intervention in Libya, and its silence during the 2004 Haitian coup d'état.

HRW has been retaliated against by governments upset by its reporting, including Russia, which effectively banned it from operating in Russia in 2025.

== Alison Des Forges Award ==
The Alison Des Forges Award for Extraordinary Activism is named after Alison Des Forges; until 2009, it was known as the Human Rights Defenders Award. It was given out by Human Rights Watch.

== Marca Bristo Fellowship ==
In 2020, Human Rights Watch created a Fellowship in memory of Marca Bristo. The first recipient was Hauwa Ojeifo, a Nigerian human rights advocate.

== See also ==
- Academic freedom in the Middle East
- American Freedom Campaign
- Freedom House
- Helsinki Committee for Human Rights
- Human Rights First
- International Freedom of Expression Exchange
- National Endowment for Democracy
- National Democratic Institute
