= Alameda Times-Star =

Defunct newspaper published in Alameda, California

- Type: Daily newspaper
- Owner: Bay Area News Group
- Founder: Truman G. Daniels
- Founded: 1877 (as Alameda Argus)
- Ceased publication: 2011
- Language: English
- City: Alameda, California
- OCLC number: 28700318

The Alameda Times-Star was a newspaper in the city of Alameda, California. It originated in 1877 and ceased in 2011 after merging into the Oakland Tribune.

== History ==
On December 6, 1877, Truman G. Daniels published the first edition of the Alameda Argus. In 1906, J. Sherman McDowell leased the Argus from Daniels who had become preoccupied with his duties as a receiver for the United States General Land Office. Previously, McDowell worked as business manager of the Oakland Tribune.

Two years later, two rival papers launched in the same month. On August 4, 1908, J.J. Bayard first published the Alameda Daily Star. On August 25, 1908, Edwin C. Williams first published the Alameda Daily Times. Soon afterwards, his father-in-law, who was a contractor, sued Williams to receive a $100 payment for carpenter work down on a bank basement converted into the paper's pressroom. Payment was sought to settle with several sub-contractors. That December, Williams suspended the Times.

In January 1909, McDowell purchased and revived the Times. At that time Daniels resumed management of the Argus. McDowell also acquired the Star and merged his two papers together. On January 2, 1909, the first edition of the Alameda Times-Star was published. A month later Daniels sold the Argus to Percival R. Milnes, owner of the Richmond Record. Later that year Daniels sued Milnes in an attempt to foreclose a $7,000 mortgage claiming he had defaulted on interest payments. Milnes made no contest and a judge returned the Argus to Daniels.

In 1912, W.A. Grahn purchased the Argus, and then merged his paper into the Times-Star. Grahn retained a minority interest. In 1931, McDowell died. A few months later, the paper was purchased from his widow and children by former governor Friend W. Richardson, who sold it to Helim G. Spaulding and Ralph T. Meeker in 1932. Meeker was bought out by Spaulding in 1934. Spaulding sold the Times-Star to Abraham "Abe" Kofman in 1939.

In 1949, Kofman sold the paper to William G. Werner, former owner of the Gilroy Dispatch. In 1961, Kofman reacquired the paper from Werner. In 1986, Kofman died. A month later the Kofman family sold the Times-Star, with a circulation of 8,700, to Alameda Newspapers, Inc. a subsidiary of MediaNews Group. At that time the company was headed by William Dean Singleton. In 1996, the Time-Star closed its office in Alameda and transferred its six remaining employees to the office of its sibling paper, the Oakland Tribune.

In 2006, the subsidiary became the Bay Area News Group. In 2011, the Times-Star was scheduled to close after merging with the Oakland Tribune, Hayward Daily Review, Fremont Argus and West County Times. Moving forward, subscribers would receive the East Bay Tribune, a localized edition of the San Jose Mercury-News. The plan was changed due to reader feedback, and this resulted in the Time-Star being absorbed into the Oakland Tribune.
