= Daily Review =

Defunct newspaper published in Hayward, California

- Type: Daily newspaper
- Owner: Bay Area News Group
- Founder(s): Daniel M. Conner; H.W. Dockham
- Founded: 1891
- Ceased publication: 2016
- Language: English
- City: Hayward, California
- Country: United States
- Website: www.eastbaytimes.com/location/hayward

The Daily Review was a daily newspaper published in Hayward, California, published from 1891 to 2016. It was last owned by the Bay Area News Group, a subsidiary of MediaNews Group, which bought the paper in 1985.

== History ==
In 1891, Daniel M. Conner and H.W. Dockham founded the Hayward Review. In 1893, Dr. A.P. Miller bought out Dockham, and exited the business after a year. In 1895, Conner sold the paper to A.V. Morgan, former owner of the Bodie Miner. In 1899, Morgan died from an illness. His brothers S.T. Morgan and O.R. Morgan then took over the paper.

The Review was acquired from the Morgans by Samuel C. Smith and M.J. Beaumont in 1904. In 1906, Smith's 11-year-old daughter accidentally electrocuted herself while standing up in the bathtub to turn on an electric light. At some point Beaumont left the business. Smith retired from the paper in 1907 to focus on real estate. At that time, the Review became affiliated with the Calkins Newspaper Syndicate, owned by Thomas D. Calkins.

In 1910, Fred E. Adams and Smith acquired the paper. In 1912, Adams acquired full ownership from Calkins. In 1915, Adams sold the paper to the Review Publishing Co. Smith continued as editor and J.S. Melo, Jr., editor of two local Portuguese language periodicals, was named business manager. In January 1925, George D. Crissey, Hal E. Reynolds became co-owners in the business with Melo, Jr. and expanded the paper into a daily.

The paper was acquired by N.R. Moore, former publisher of the Corvallis Times, in October 1925, followed by John J. Hooper in 1930. In 1944, Hopper sold the Review and Southern Alameda County News to Floyd L. Sparks, Dan L. Beebe and Glen Wright. Later that year, Sparks bought out the other two partners. At that time the Review was a twice-weekly with a 1,800 circulation. Over the years Sparks bought other papers. In 1950, he expanded the Review into a daily with a 6,000 circulation. By 1985, the paper had a circulation of 46,000.

In 1985, Sparks sold the Daily Review, Fremont Argus, Tri-Valley Herald and San Ramon Valley Herald to Garden State Newspapers, Inc., a subsidiary of MediaNews Group. The papers had a combined circulation of 97,000 and the sale price was $65 million. Following the sale, 130 employees were laid off. In 1988, Sparks died.

In 2011, the Daily Review was scheduled to close after merging with the Oakland Tribune, Alameda Times-Star, Fremont Argus and West County Times. Moving forward, subscribers would receive the East Bay Tribune, a localized edition of the San Jose Mercury-News. The plan was changed due to reader feedback, and the Daily Review was saved. In 2016, the Daily Review, Contra Costa Times, Fremont Argus and Oakland Tribune were combined to form the East Bay Times.
