= The Argus (Fremont) =

- Type: Daily newspaper
- Owner: MediaNews Group
- Founder: Viola Johnson
- Founded: April 29, 1960
- Ceased publication: April 4, 2016
- Language: English
- Headquarters: Fremont, California
- OCLC number: 31036225
- Website: www.eastbaytimes.com/location/fremont/

The Argus was a newspaper in the town of Fremont, California. It was published from 1960 to 2016.

== History ==
On April 29, 1960, Mrs. Viola Johnson published the weekly first edition of The Argus in Newark, California. In March 1983, Newark mayor George M. Silliman became business manager. In April 1964, Silliman acquired The Argus from Johnson and succeeded her as publisher. In October 1964, a Saturday edition was added.

A few years later Floyd L. Sparks, owner of the Daily Review, acquired the paper. In 1966, the paper was expanded into a daily, with six editions a week. By then the paper employed 37 workers and was based in Fremont, California. In 1974, Johnson, the paper's founder, died at age 56.

In 1985, Sparks sold the Fremont Argus, Daily Review, Tri-Valley Herald and San Ramon Valley Herald to Garden State Newspapers, Inc., a subsidiary of MediaNews Group. The papers had a combined circulation of 97,000 and the sale price was $65 million. Following the sale, 130 employees were laid off. In 1988, Sparks died.

In 2011, the Fremont Argus was scheduled to close after merging with the Oakland Tribune, Alameda Times-Star, Daily Review and West County Times. Moving forward, subscribers would receive the East Bay Tribune, a localized edition of the San Jose Mercury-News. The plan was changed due to reader feedback, and the Fremont Argus was saved. In 2016, the Fremont Argus, Daily Review, Contra Costa Times and Oakland Tribune were combined to form the East Bay Times.
