= American Freedom Campaign =

The American Freedom Campaign is an organization that has as its goal to put restoration of the Constitution on the agenda for Democratic presidential candidates, roughly parallel to the goal of the American Freedom Agenda for Republican candidates, although Democratic and Republican candidates could sign on to both pledges. It was launched in July 2007 by the Center for Constitutional Rights, Human Rights Watch and MoveOn.

The group urges presidential candidates to sign its "American Freedom Pledge", which reads:

We are Americans, and in our America we do not torture, we do not imprison people without charge or legal recourse, allow our phones and emails to be tapped without a court order, and above all we do not give any President unchecked power. I pledge to fight to protect and defend the Constitution from assault by any President.

The Constitution protects American Freedom. With checks and balances, and basic legal rights, it has prevented tyranny and safeguarded our liberty.

I hereby join the American Freedom Campaign to educate my neighbors about the threat and urge my representatives to confront and correct these abuses of our America.

AFC was co-founded by Naomi Wolf, Wes Boyd and William Haseltine.
