= San Mateo County Times =

Former daily newspaper in San Mateo, California

- Type: Daily newspaper
- Owner: Bay Area News Group (1996–2016)
- Founder: Robert A. Thompson
- Founded: April 4, 1901; 125 years ago
- Ceased publication: 2016
- Language: English
- City: San Mateo, California
- Country: United States
- OCLC number: 37552021
- Website: mercurynews.com/san-mateo-county-times

The San Mateo County Times was a daily newspaper published by the Media News Group. The paper was distributed throughout San Mateo County, Monday through Saturday. Before being sold in 1996, it had been published for over 100 years as the San Mateo Times, originally published by Amphlett Publishing.

== History ==
In 1901, Robert A. Thompson founded the San Mateo Times. A month later he sold the paper to W.H. Meacham and William Dillon. Dillon was soon succeeded by H.D. Hickok, who in 1902 sold out to Meacham, who left at the year's end.

In 1903, L.P. Hathaway exited the business and left the paper to Paul Pickney and Henry Thiel. In 1909, Thiel retired due to ill health and left Pickney as sole owner. In 1918, Pickney died at age 51 after a year-long illness. Pickney willed the paper to his devoted friend Horace W. Amphlett.

In 1924, the Times expanded into a daily. In 1926, Amphlett purchased The Daily News Leader, the first and oldest paper in the county, from Ed S. Riggins and merged it into the Times. In 1933, Amphlett died at age 43 from a Heart attack. Trustees then appointed Earl Callum as general manager. In 1943, J. Hart Clinton was named publisher.

In 1962, Amphlett Publishing launched a weekly paper called The Post, covering Westlake, Daly City and Pacifica. In 1987, John H. Clinton succeeded his father as publisher. I n 1992, the Times experienced layoffs and wage cuts. That same year, J. Hart Clinton died at age 87. In 1996, the Times and the surviving weekly newspapers owned and published by Amphlett Publishing were purchased by ANG Newspapers (Alameda Newspaper Group), an Oakland, California-based subsidiary of MediaNews Group. At that time the Times had a 39,000 circulation

In 2010, former owner Amphlett was posthumously inducted into the California Newspaper Hall of Fame. In 2011, Bay Area News Group announced that the Times would publish its last issue on November 1, 2011. From Nov. 2, 2011, subscribers would receive localized versions of the San Jose Mercury News. The plan was later canceled. In 2016, the Times was merged with five other papers to form the East Bay Times.
