= Tri-Valley Herald =

Newspaper in Pleasanton, California

- Type: Weekly newspaper
- Owner: MediaNews Group
- Founder(s): George B. Shearer; Charles C. Leys.
- Founded: 1874 (as the Livermore Enterprise)
- Ceased publication: 2011
- Language: English
- Headquarters: Livermore, California

The Tri-Valley Herald was a newspaper published in the town of Livermore, California. It originated in 1874 and ceased in 2011.

== History ==
In May 1874, the first edition of the Livermore Enterprise was published, founded by George B. Shearer and Charles C. Leys. In January 1876, William P. Bartlett bought the paper and renamed it to the Livermore Herald. In June 1891, Bartlett sold the Herald to Edward J. Livernash.

In September 1891, a fire destroyed the paper's office. Livernash lost $1,000 and temporarily moved printing to Oakland. A few weeks later, Livernash was arrested at the San Francisco ferry landing for dressing as a woman and wearing Blackface in public. He claimed it was part of a Practical joke played on his wife, but when searched, police found "pounds of poison" on him, specifically Chloroform and Prussic acid. Livernash claimed the chemicals were for personal use. In court, his doctor testified Livernash suffered from Insomnia and Auto-hypnosis. In November 1891, J.H. Dungan took over as publisher. In December 1896, Henry F. Ellis and Sherman E. Wright the paper.

In July 1899, Arthur L. Henry, former owner of the Dixon Tribune, bought the Herald. Henry published the paper for two decades. In March 1920, Henry died, and his son Maitland R. Henry took over as publisher. In October 1956, Lowell E. Jessen, of Beverly Hills, who was co-owner of the Turlock Journal with Stanley T. Wilson, purchased the Livermore Herald from the Henry family and Livermore News from Lionel Horwitz. He then merged the two to form the News and Herald. In October 1960, Jessen retired as publisher and was succeeded by Robert Penland, former owner of the Heppner Gazette-Times.

In June 1965, Floyd L. Sparks, owner of the Daily Review, bought the paper. In 1972, he renamed the publication to the Tri-Valley Herald & News and a year later dropped the word "News" from the masthead. In June 1985, Sparks sold the Daily Review, Fremont Argus, Tri-Valley Herald and San Ramon Valley Herald to Garden State Newspapers, Inc., a subsidiary of MediaNews Group. The papers had a combined circulation of 97,000 and the sale price was $65 million. Following the sale, 130 employees were laid off. In March 1988, Sparks died. The last issue of the Herald was published on November 1, 2011, after which the paper was consolidated with the BANG-EB papers Contra Costa Times, Valley Times, San Ramon Valley Times, East County Times, and San Joaquin Herald under the new name Tri-Valley Times, a localized edition of The Mercury News.
