= List of Hillary Clinton 2008 presidential campaign endorsements =

Hillary Clinton

Democratic Party candidate for President of the United States
- Election date 2008

Personal details
- Party: Democratic Party
- Website: www.hillaryclinton.com

This is a list of prominent individuals and organizations who formally endorsed or voiced support for Hillary Clinton as the Democratic Party's presidential nominee for the 2008 U.S. presidential election.

== Executive officials ==
- Bill Clinton, former President of the United States
- Walter Mondale, former Vice President of the United States

=== Cabinet officials ===
- Henry Cisneros, former Secretary of Housing and Urban Development and former Mayor of San Antonio
- Debra DeLee, former Chair of the Democratic National Committee
- Steve Grossman, former Chair of the Democratic National Committee
- Donald Fowler, former Chair of the Democratic National Committee
- Terry McAuliffe, former Chair of the Democratic National Committee
- Mack McLarty, former White House Chief of Staff
- Leon Panetta, former White House Chief of Staff
- Donna Shalala, former Secretary of Health and Human Services and President of the University of Miami
- Rodney Slater, former Secretary of Transportation
- Robert Strauss, former Chair of the Democratic National Committee
- Andrew Young, former United States Ambassador to the United Nations and former Mayor of Atlanta

== U.S. senators ==
- Sen. Evan Bayh (D-IN), National Campaign Co-Chair
- Sen. Blanche Lincoln (D-AR)
- Sen. Maria Cantwell (D-WA)
- Sen. Dianne Feinstein (D-CA), Chairwoman of the Rules and Administration Committee
- Sen. Daniel Inouye (D-HI), Chairman of the Commerce, Science and Transportation Committee
- Sen. Robert Menendez (D-NJ)
- Sen. Barbara Mikulski (D-MD)
- Sen. Patty Murray (D-WA)
- Sen. Bill Nelson (D-FL)
- Sen. Mark Pryor (D-AR)
- Sen. Chuck Schumer (D-NY)
- Sen. Debbie Stabenow (D-MI)
- Sen. Sheldon Whitehouse (D-RI)
- Fmr. Sen. John Breaux (D-LA)
- Fmr. Sen. John Glenn (D-OH), former NASA astronaut, 1984 presidential candidate
- Fmr. Sen. Dee Huddleston (D-KY)
- Fmr. Sen. Claiborne Pell (D-RI)
- Fmr. Sen. Robert Torricelli (D-NJ)

== U.S. representatives ==
- Jay Inslee, U.S. representative from WA-01
- Darlene Hooley U.S. representative from OR-05
- Ruben Hinojosa U.S. representative from TX-15
- Solomon Ortiz, U.S. representative from TX-27
- Maurice Hinchey, U.S. representative from NY-22
- Alcee Hastings, U.S. representative from FL-23
- Rep. Eliot Engel (D-NY)
- Jerry Nadler, U.S. representative from NY-10
- Rep. Norm Dicks (D-WA)
- Rep. Diana DeGette (D-CO)
- Rep. Henry Cuellar (D-TX)
- Rep. Joe Crowley (D-NY)
- Rep. Carolyn Maloney (D-NY)
- Rep. Carolyn McCarthy (D-NY)
- Rep. Brian Higgins (D-NY)
- Rep. John Hall (D-NY)
- Rep. Steve Israel (D-NY)
- Rep. Kirsten Gillibrand (D-NY)
- Rep. Michael McNulty (D-NY)
- Rep. Gregory Meeks (D-NY)
- Rep. Kendrick Meek (D-FL)
- Rep. Anthony Weiner, U.S. representative from NY-09
- Rep. Yvette Clarke (D-NY)
- Rep. Dennis Cardoza (D-CA)
- Rep. Corrine Brown (D-FL)
- Rep. Tim Bishop (D-NY)
- Rep. Marion Berry (D-AR)
- Rep. Mike Arcuri (D-NY)
- Rep. Gary Ackerman (D-NY)
- Rep. Richard Neal (D-MA)
- Rep. Chris Carney (D-PA)
- Rep. Heath Shuler (D-NC)
- Rep. Stephanie Tubbs Jones (D-OH)
- Rep. Rob Andrews (D-NJ)
- Rep. Leonard Boswell (D-IA)
- Rep. Joe Baca (D-CA)
- Rep. Tammy Baldwin (D-WI)
- Rep. Shelley Berkley (D-NV)
- Rep. Charles Rangel (D-NY)
- Fmr. Speaker of the United States House of Representatives Jim Wright (D-TX)
- Fmr. Rep. James Barcia (D-MI)
- Fmr. Rep. Edward Beard (D-RI)
- Fmr. Rep. Ken Bentsen (D-TX)
- Fmr. Rep. Jack Brooks (D-TX)
- Fmr. Rep. Kika de la Garza (D-TX)
- Fmr. Rep. Mervyn Dymally (D-CA)
- Fmr. Rep. Vic Fazio (D-CA)
- Fmr. Rep. and 1984 vice presidential candidate Geraldine Ferraro (D-NY)
- Fmr. Rep. Floyd Flake (D-NY)
- Fmr. Rep. Jack Hightower (D-TX)
- Fmr. Rep. James H. Maloney (D-CT)
- Fmr. Rep. Marjorie Margolies-Mezvinsky (D-PA)
- Fmr. Rep. William Patman (D-TX)
- Fmr. Rep. Marty Russo (D-IL)
- Fmr. Rep. Ronnie Shows (D-MS)
- Fmr. Speaker of the United States House of Representatives Tom Foley (D-WA)

== Governors ==
- Gov. Ted Kulongoski (D-OR)
- Gov. John Baldacci (D-ME)
- Gov. Mike Beebe (D-AR)
- Gov. Jon Corzine (D-NJ)
- Gov. Jennifer Granholm (D-MI)
- Gov. Martin O'Malley (D-MD)
- Gov. Mike Easley (D-NC)
- Gov. David Paterson (D-NY)
- Gov. Ed Rendell (D-PA)
- Gov. Ted Strickland (D-OH)
- Fmr. Gov. Tom Vilsack (D-IA)
- Fmr. Gov. John Y. Brown, Jr. (D-KY)
- Fmr. Gov. Julian Carroll (D-KY)
- Fmr. Gov. Wendell Ford (D-KY),
- Fmr. Gov. Paul E. Patton (D-KY)
- Fmr. Gov. and Fmr. Rep. Carlos Romero Barceló (PR)
- Fmr. Gov. Pedro Rossello (PR)
- Fmr. Gov. Hulett Smith (D-WV)
- Fmr. Gov. John Waihee (D-HI)
- Fmr. Gov. Brendan Byrne (D-NJ)

== State and local officials ==
- Andrew Cuomo, Attorney General of New York
- Fmr. Lt. Governor Kathleen Kennedy Townsend (D-MD)

=== Mayors ===
- Allentown, PA Mayor Ed Pawlowski (D-PA)
- Boston, MA Mayor Thomas Menino (D-MA)
- Hinton, West Virginia Mayor Cleo Mathews (D-WV)
- Kalispell, Montana Mayor Pam Kennedy (MT)
- Los Angeles, CA Mayor Antonio Villaraigosa (D-CA)
- Morgantown, West Virginia Mayor Ron Justice (D-WV)
- Oakland, CA Mayor Ron Dellums(D-CA)
- Philadelphia, PA Mayor Michael Nutter (D-PA)
- Pittsburgh, PA Mayor Luke Ravenstahl (D-PA)
- St. Louis, MO Mayor Francis G. Slay (D-MO)
- San Francisco, CA Mayor Gavin Newsom (D-CA)
- Williamstown, West Virginia Mayor Jean Ford (WV)

=== Kentucky ===
- Kentucky House Majority Leader Rocky Adkins
- Kentucky State Senator Denise Harper Angel (D-KY)
- State Rep. Joni Jenkins (D-KY)
- State Rep. Leslie A. Combs (D-KY)
- State Rep. Dottie J. Sims (D-KY)
- State Rep. Mary Lou Marzian (D-KY)
- Kentucky House Speaker Jody Richards
- State Rep. Robin L. Webb (D-KY) (later switched to Republican Party)

=== Maryland ===
- Kathleen Kennedy Townsend, former Lieutenant Governor of Maryland and member of the Kennedy family
- Maryland House of Delegates Speaker Pro Tempore Adrienne A. Jones (D-MD)
- Maryland House of Delegates member Susan C. Lee (D-MD)
- Maryland House of Delegates Deputy Majority Whip Shirley Nathan-Pulliam (D-MD)
- Maryland House of Delegates Deputy Speaker pro Tempore Carolyn J. B. Howard (D-MD)
- Maryland House of Delegates Deputy Majority Leader Shane E. Pendergrass (D-MD)

=== Ohio ===
- Sean Brennan, President of the Parma City Council

=== Oklahoma ===
- Secretary of State of Oklahoma Susan Savage (D-OK)
- State Rep. Al McAffrey (D-OK)
- State Rep. Scott Bighorse (D-OK)
- Fmr. President Pro Tem of Oklahoma Senate and Fmr. Mayor of Tulsa Rodger Randle (D-OK)
- Fmr. Speaker of the Oklahoma House of Representatives Larry Adair (D-OK)
- Fmr. Speaker of the Oklahoma House of Representatives Steve Lewis (D-OK)

=== West Virginia ===
- West Virginia House of Delegates member Bonnie Brown (D-WV)
- House of Delegates member Richard Browning (D-WV)
- State Senate Majority Leader H. Truman Chafin (D-WV)
- House of Delegates member Barbara Evans Fleischauer (D-WV)
- House of Delegates member Barbara Hatfield (D-WV)
- House of Delegates member Linda Longstreth (D-WV)
- House of Delegates member Steve Kominar (D-WV)
- House of Delegates member Tim Miley (D-WV)
- State Senator Michael Oliverio (D-WV)
- House of Delegates member Dan Poling (D-WV)
- House of Delegates member Roman Prezioso (D-WV)
- Fmr. Speaker Pro Tempore of the West Virginia House of Delegates Phyllis Rutledge (D-WV)
- House of Delegates member Bob Tabb (D-WV)

== International officials ==
- Mona Sahlin, leader of the Social Democratic Party of Sweden

== Newspapers ==
- Akron Beacon Journal
- Anniston Star
- Bend Bulletin newspaper in Bend, Oregon
- Buffalo News
- Burlington Hawk Eye newspaper in Burlington, Iowa
- Cabinet Press group of weekly newspapers in New Hampshire which includes: The Milford Cabinet, Bedford Journal, Hollis Brookline Journal and Merrimack Journal
- The Citizen (Laconia, NH)
- Cape Cod Times newspaper in Cape Cod Massachusetts
- Columbus Dispatch
- The Commercial Appeal (Memphis, TN)
- Concord Monitor newspaper in Concord, New Hampshire
- The New York Blade, an LGBT newspaper in New York City, New York
- The Daily Texan, student newspaper of the University of Texas
- The Daily Pennsylvanian college newspaper at the University of Pennsylvania
- Denver Post
- The Des Moines Register
- El Mundo, Spanish-language newspaper in Nevada
- El Mundo, Spanish-language newspaper group in San Francisco, California
- Foster's Daily Democrat newspaper in Dover, New Hampshire
- The Hartford Courant
- Indianapolis Star (Indianapolis, Indiana)
- Irish Voice Irish American Newspaper in the United States
- The Jersey Journal
- Kansas City Star newspaper in Kansas City, Missouri
- Keene Sentinel newspaper in Keene, New Hampshire
- Laconia Citizen newspaper in Laconia, New Hampshire
- Laredo Morning Times newspaper in Laredo, Texas
- Las Vegas Sun newspaper in Las Vegas, Nevada
- The Montgomery Advertiser
- The Sun News, newspaper in Myrtle Beach, South Carolina
- The New York Amsterdam News
- Newsday
- New York Times
- Pittsburgh Tribune-Review
- Orlando Sentinel newspaper in Orlando, Florida
- Plymouth Record Enterprise newspaper in Plymouth, New Hampshire
- Post News Group newspaper group family in Berkeley, California, Oakland, California, Richmond, California, San Francisco, California and San Jose, California
- Quad City Times, newspaper in the Quad Cities in Iowa
- Salmon Press group of weekly newspapers in New Hampshire which includes: The Littleton Courier, Coos County Democrat (Lancaster, NH), Berlin Reporter, Granite State News (Wolfeboro, NH), Carroll County Independent (Conway, NH), Meredith News, Record Enterprise (Plymouth, NH), Winnisquam Echo (Tilton, NH), Gilford Steamer, Baysider (Alton, NH), and The Mountain Ear
- The Salt Lake Tribune, newspaper in Salt Lake City, Utah
- Statesman Journal, newspaper in Salem, Oregon
- The Times Union (Albany, NY)
- The Vinton Eagle weekly newspaper in Benton County, Iowa
- Washington Blade, an LGBT newspaper in Washington, D.C.
- The Zanesville Times Recorder, a newspaper in Zanesville, Ohio

== Labor unions ==
December 2007 poster showing the endorsement of Clinton by the American Federation of State, County and Municipal Employees.

- New York's Civil Service Employees Association, Local 1000 AFSCME

== Political groups ==
- Houston Area Stonewall Democrats
- National Organization for Women
- Stonewall Democratic Club of New York City

== Entertainers ==
- Actor Sean Astin
- Musician Tony Bennett
- Actress Lynda Carter
- Musician Cher
- Actor Chevy Chase
- Film producer Bruce Cohen
- Musician Willie Colón
- Musician Elvis Costello
- Actor Billy Crystal
- Talk show host Ellen DeGeneres
- Musician Kenny "Babyface" Edmonds
- Actress Sally Field
- Actress Whoopi Goldberg
- Actress Melanie Griffith
- Musician Merle Haggard
- Musician Sophie B. Hawkins
- Playboy magazine founder Hugh Hefner
- Paris Hilton, socialite and media personality
- Pornographic actress Jenna Jameson
- Musician Elton John
- Actress Eva Longoria
- Musician Madonna
- Musician and American Idol finalist Katharine McPhee
- Actor Jack Nicholson
- Film director Rob Reiner
- Actress and comedian Caroline Rhea
- Actress Victoria Rowell
- Musician Carly Simon
- Talk show host and Fmr. Cincinnati Mayor Jerry Springer (D-OH)
- Actress Mary Steenburgen
- Musician Barbra Streisand
- Tiger Tyson, pornographic actor

== Other individuals ==
- Donald Trump, businessman and television personality (co-endorsement with Rudy Giuliani)
- Kari Ann Peniche, reality television personality
- Martha Stewart, businesswoman and media personality
- Tom Steyer, businessman and hedge fund manager
- Billie Jean King, tennis player
- Sarah Fisher, race car driver
- Magic Johnson, basketballer
- Hank Aaron, baseball player
- Hugh Shelton, former Chairman of the Joint Chiefs of Staff
- Wesley Clark, former U.S. Army General & candidate for President in 2004
- John R. Allen, former Marine Corps General
- Maya Angelou, poet
- Susan Estrich, writer
- Erica Jong, writer
- Anne Rice, novelist
- Sean Wilentz, historian
- Phyllis George, businesswoman, news anchor & former First Lady of Kentucky
- Anthony Shriver, founder of Best Buddies International and a member of the Kennedy family
- Kerry Kennedy, attorney, activist and member of the Kennedy family
- Robert F. Kennedy, Jr., environmental activist and member of the Kennedy family

== See also ==
- Congressional endorsements for the 2008 United States presidential election
- Newspaper endorsements in the United States presidential primaries, 2008
- List of Barack Obama presidential campaign endorsements, 2008
- List of John McCain presidential campaign endorsements
- List of Hillary Clinton presidential campaign political endorsements, 2016
- List of Hillary Clinton presidential campaign non-political endorsements, 2016
