= Democratic and liberal support for John McCain in 2008 =

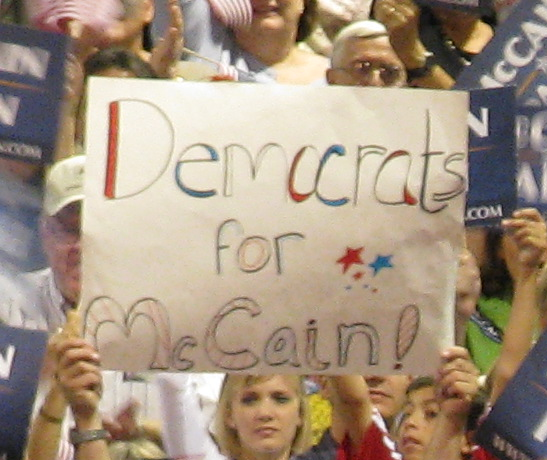
"Democrats for McCain" sign at a McCain campaign rally in Albuquerque

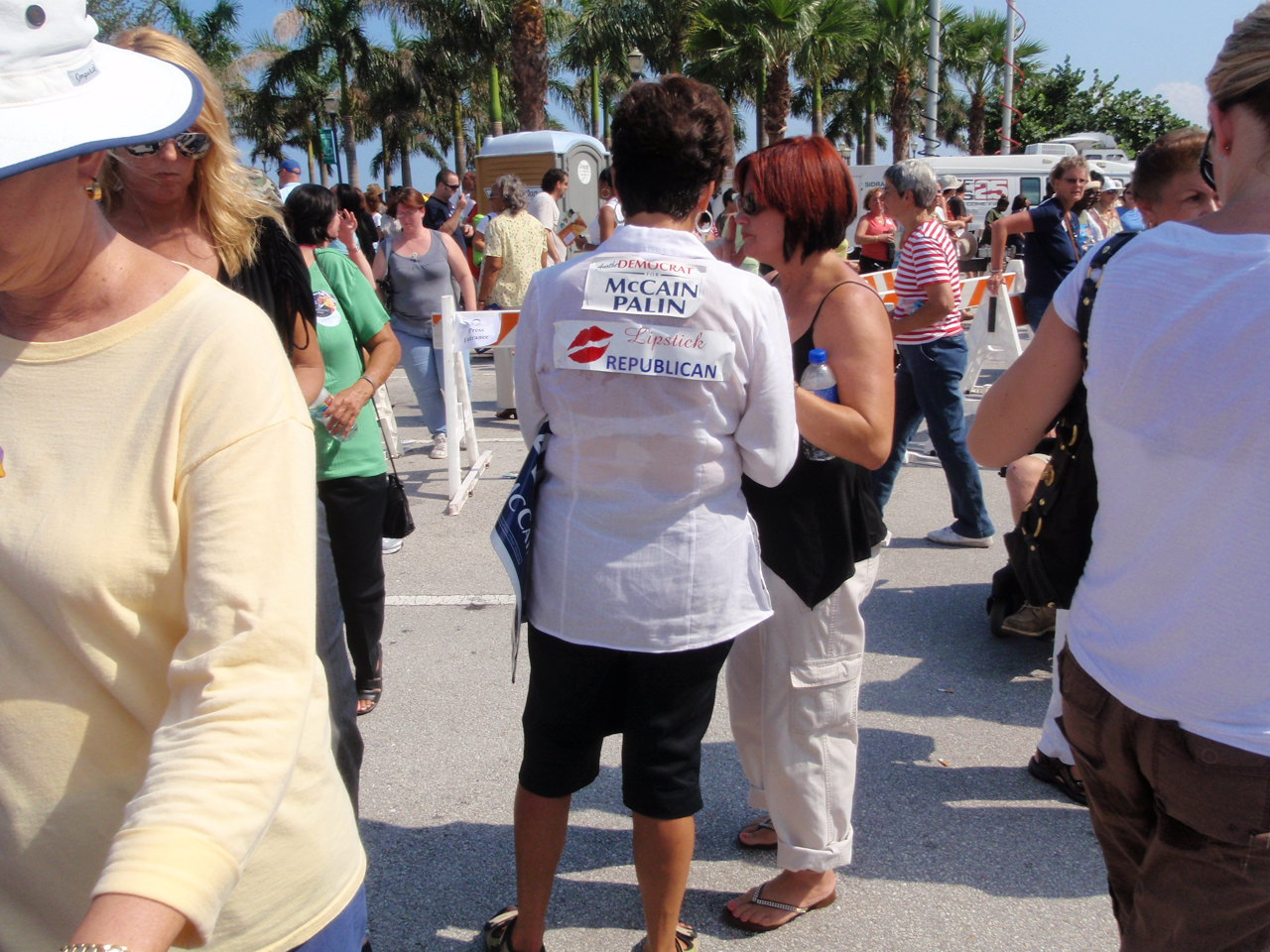
A woman wearing a sign saying, "Another Democrat for McCain/Palin"

Senator John McCain, the Republican Party nominee, was endorsed or supported by some members of the Democratic Party and by some political figures holding liberal views in the 2008 United States presidential election. McCain Democrat and McCainocrat are terms applied to Democrats who supported McCain.

Democratic and liberal supporters of McCain included some elected officials, retired elected officials, journalists, and some supporters of Hillary Clinton's unsuccessful primary campaign. According to exit polls on Election Day, 10% of those who identified themselves as Democrats voted for John McCain, approximately the same percentage of Democratic votes that George W. Bush won in 2004.

== History of the term "McCain Democrat" ==
The term "McCain Democrat" first appeared during McCain's 2000 primary campaign. McCain garnered attention for reportedly having cross-party appeal. In Texas, Charles Gandy explicitly ran for the Senate as a "McCain Democrat."

== Joe Lieberman ==
The most well-known Democratic Party member to support McCain was Senator Joe Lieberman, who had run for vice-president as a Democrat in 2000. On December 17, 2007, Lieberman endorsed McCain, contradicting his stance in July 2006 where he stated, "I want Democrats to be back in the majority in Washington and elect a Democratic president in 2008." Lieberman cited his agreement with McCain's stance on the war on terrorism as the primary reason for the endorsement.

On June 5, Lieberman launched "Citizens for McCain," hosted on the McCain campaign website, to recruit Democratic support for John McCain's candidacy. He emphasized the group's outreach to supporters of Hillary Clinton, who was at that time broadly expected to lose the Democratic presidential nomination to Barack Obama. Citizens for McCain was prominently featured in McCain team efforts to attract disgruntled Hillary Clinton supporters such as Debra Bartoshevich.

Lieberman spoke at the 2008 Republican National Convention on behalf of McCain and his running mate, Alaska Governor Sarah Palin. Lieberman was alongside McCain and Senator Lindsey Graham during a visit to French president Nicolas Sarkozy on March 21, 2008.

=== Republican vice president talk ===
Lieberman was mentioned as a possible vice presidential nominee on a McCain ticket. ABC News reported that Lieberman was McCain's first choice for vice president until several days before the selection, when McCain had decided that picking Lieberman would alienate the conservative base of the Republican Party, due to his left-of-center positions on social issues. Lieberman had been mentioned as a possible secretary of state under a McCain administration. In 2018 McCain confirmed that his advisers had counseled him to not pick Lieberman for the ticket, and that he regretted following their advice.

=== Fallout and support from Barack Obama ===
Many Democrats wanted Lieberman to be stripped of his chairmanship of the Senate Committee on Homeland Security and Governmental Affairs due to his support for John McCain. Republican Minority Leader Mitch McConnell reached out to Lieberman, asking him to caucus with the Republicans. Ultimately, the Senate Democratic Caucus voted 42 to 13 to allow Lieberman to keep chairmanship (although he did lose his membership for the Environment and Public Works Committee). Subsequently, Lieberman announced that he will continue to caucus with the Democrats. Lieberman credited President-elect Barack Obama for helping him keep his chairmanship. Obama had privately urged Democratic Senate majority Leader Harry Reid not to remove Lieberman from his position. Reid stated that Lieberman's criticism of Obama during the election angered him, but that "if you look at the problems we face as a nation, is this a time we walk out of here saying, 'Boy did we get even'?" Senator Tom Carper of Delaware also credited the Democrats' decision on Lieberman to Obama's support, stating that "If Barack can move on, so can we."

== McCain campaign efforts to recruit Democratic support ==
The case of Debra Bartoshevich, a 41-year-old emergency room nurse from Wisconsin who was featured in McCain's national television ads, is an example of McCain team efforts to recruit high-profile Democrats and supporters of Hillary Clinton. In the ad, Bartoshevich declares herself "a proud Hillary Clinton Democrat" who will vote for John McCain, rather than Barack Obama, in the 2008 presidential election.

Bartoshevich's support for McCain made national news because she was a delegate to the Democratic National Convention, one of four people from Racine County, Wisconsin selected by a local Democratic caucus. The Racine, Wisconsin Journal Time quotes her, "in a speech before the votes were cast" telling other delegates "I support her because of her universal health care plan...I see the devastating consequences of diseases on the uninsured."

Bartoshevich can be seen on YouTube telling a television interviewer that she was contacted by the McCain campaign "approximately three minutes" after Hillary Clinton's June 5 speech suspending her campaign for the presidency.

On Friday, June 13, the Milwaukee, Wisconsin Journal Sentinel's website reported Bartoshevich's public affiliation with the McCain campaign. She told the Journal Sentinel that her sister had "encouraged" her to sign up as a supporter with “Citizens for McCain,” an arm of the campaign targeting Democrats and independents. Bartoshevich added that it was the McCain campaign, not she herself, who then notified a reporter. In a later statement to Wisconsin Democratic Party leaders, however, Bartoshevich claimed that it was in fact her sister, who was working for Citizens for McCain, who had put her name onto the McCain campaign website.

McCain himself traveled to Racine in July, where he met with Bartoshevich before introducing her and her family to a campaign gathering of about 1,000 people. On August 25, the new ad (called "Debra") was launched. A second McCain ad launched the same day (called "Passed Over") also urged Hillary Clinton's followers to switch allegiance to McCain.

Also on August 25, Bartoshevich was made the central figure of a press conference sponsored by the Republican National Committee and hosted by Carly Fiorina. Bartoshevich, who is pro-choice, was asked about McCain's views on Roe v. Wade. She responded by saying, "Going back to 1999, John McCain did an interview with the San Francisco Chronicle saying that overturning Roe v. Wade would not make any sense, because then women would have to have illegal abortions". This raised questions, because McCain's position as of August 2008 was that Roe v. Wade should be overturned. In the presidential debate held on October 15, McCain reiterated this point.

== Conservative Democratic voters and Hillary Clinton supporters ==
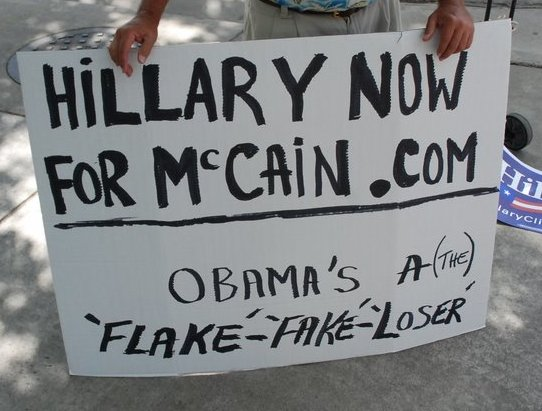
Individual with a sign outside the 2008 DNC advertising a website called "Hillary; now for McCain"

The Gallup Poll indicates McCain's support among Democrats calling themselves "conservative" by party standards has varied from a low of 15% to a high of 26% according to Gallup.

During the campaign, there was significant media discussion of Democratic Hillary Clinton voters backing McCain, in particular members of People United Means Action (also known as PUMA, originally standing for "Party Unity My Ass," and also known as "Just Stay No Deal") and those sympathetic to it. After Clinton's June 8 concession, 40% of women who supported Clinton described themselves as dissatisfied and 7% described themselves as angry; 25% said they would support McCain in November.

== Polling data ==
According to Gallup Polls from June 9 to August 17 McCain's cross-party support fluctuated between 10% and 13%. In the poll for August 18 to August 24 support for McCain among Democrats peaked at 14%. From October 13 to October 19 polls showed McCain's support among Democrats to be 7%, which was the lowest thus far. The CNN exit polls placed his Democratic support at 10% with the same percentage for liberal support. These results may not represent the general voters due to early voting.

According to exit polls on Election Day, McCain won the votes of only 10% of Democrats nationwide, the same percentage of Democrats' votes that George W. Bush won in 2004.

== Democrats and former Democrats who endorsed John McCain ==
- Bartle Bull (the elder), aide for Robert F. Kennedy.
- Wendy Button, former speechwriter for Barack Obama, John Edwards, and Hillary Clinton.
- Orson Scott Card, science fiction author and Democratic columnist said that he supported and voted for Barack Obama during the primary season, but had become a McCain supporter by September 2008.
- David Carlin, former Democratic majority leader of the Rhode Island Senate (pre-1992)
- Mark W. Erwin, former U.S. Ambassador
- Brenda Ferland, formerly Democratic member of the New Hampshire House of Representatives.
- Dick A. Greco, former Mayor of Tampa, Florida
- Doreen Howard, member of the New Hampshire House of Representatives
- Paul Johnson, former Mayor of Phoenix, Arizona (1990–94)
- Alexander M. Keith, former Lt. Governor (1963–1967) of Minnesota (conservative, member of the Minnesota Democratic-Farmer-Labor Party)
- Elaine Lafferty, former editor of Ms. magazine
- Joe Lieberman, Former Senator for the state of Connecticut and 2000 Democratic vice-presidential candidate (ID-CT)
- Shelly Mandell, president of the Los Angeles, California chapter of National Organization for Women
- Zell Miller, former U.S. Senator (D-GA)
- Tim Penny, former Representative (1983–1995) (once a member of the Minnesota Democratic-Farmer-Labor Party)
- Lynn Forester de Rothschild, businesswoman and fundraiser for Hillary Clinton
- Donald Trump, businessman, television personality, politician, and current president of the United States (at the time belonged to the conservative wing of the Democratic Party before subsequently becoming a Republican).
- Bill Veroneau, former mayor of Concord, New Hampshire
- Steve Wenzel, former state representative in Minnesota (Bush appointee to the USDA, since then he has only contributed to Republicans)
- R. James Woolsey Jr., former CIA Director under President Bill Clinton, who describes himself as a "Scoop Jackson Democrat."

== Democratic politicians who voted for McCain, but did not formally endorse ==
- Dov Hikind, New York Assemblyman and host of The Dov Hikind Show
- Gene Taylor – U.S. representative from Mississippi's 4th congressional district

== See also ==
- Democrats for Nixon
- Reagan Democrat
- Party switching
- Obama Republican
- Obama–Trump voters
- People United Means Action
