= List of John McCain 2008 presidential campaign endorsements =

John McCain, the nominee of the Republican party in the 2008 United States presidential election, has gained the endorsements of many high-profile figures.

Both McCain and his Democratic opponent, Barack Obama, have stated that a person or entity's endorsement of their candidacy does not necessarily imply an endorsement by the candidate of all of the views of the endorser.

== U.S. presidents, vice presidents, and spouses ==
- President George W. Bush
- Vice President Dick Cheney
- Former president George H. W. Bush
- Former vice president Dan Quayle
- Former first lady Nancy Reagan

== U.S. senators ==
- Senator Wayne Allard (R-CO)
- Senator Kit Bond (R-MO)
- Senator Sam Brownback (R-KS), former 2008 presidential candidate
- Senator Richard Burr (R-NC)
- Senator Saxby Chambliss (R-GA)
- Senator Tom Coburn (R-OK)
- Senator Thad Cochran (R-MS)
- Senator Norm Coleman (R-MN)
- Senator Susan Collins (R-ME), Ranking Member of Senate Homeland Security Committee
- Senator John Cornyn (R-TX)
- Senator Pete Domenici (R-NM)
- Senator John Ensign (R-NV)
- Senator Lindsey Graham (R-SC)
- Senator Kay Bailey Hutchison (R-TX)
- Senator Johnny Isakson (R-GA)
- Senator Jon Kyl (R-AZ), Senate Minority Whip
- Senator Joe Lieberman (I-CT), Chairman of Senate Homeland Security Committee and 2000 Democratic vice-presidential nominee
- Senator Richard Lugar (R-IN), ranking member of the Senate Foreign Relations Committee
- Senator Mel Martinez (R-FL)
- Senator Richard Shelby (R-AL)
- Senator Gordon Smith (R-OR), Ranking Member of Senate Aging Committee
- Senator Olympia Snowe (R-ME), Ranking Member of Senate Small Business and Entrepreneurship Committee
- Senator John Thune (R-SD)
- Senator George Voinovich (R-OH)
- Senator John Warner (R-VA), former chairman of Senate Armed Services Committee
- Former senator George Allen (R-VA)
- Former senator Howard Baker (R-TN), former Senate Majority Leader and Senate Minority Leader
- Former senator Rudy Boschwitz (R-MN)
- Former senator Conrad Burns (R-MT)
- Former senator Dan Coats (R-IN)
- Former senator Al D'Amato (R-NY)
- Former senator Ben Nighthorse Campbell
- Former senator John Danforth (R-MO), also served as Ambassador to the United Nations
- Former senator Mike DeWine (R-OH)
- Former senator Daniel J. Evans (R-WA), also served as governor of Washington
- Former senator Peter Fitzgerald (R-IL)
- Former senator Slade Gorton (R-WA)
- Former senator Phil Gramm (R-TX)
- Former senator Nancy Kassebaum Baker (R-KS)
- Former senator Bob Kasten (R-WI)
- Former senator Trent Lott (R-MS), former Senate Majority Leader and Senate Minority Whip
- Former senator Mack Mattingly (R-GA)
- Former senator Zell Miller (D-GA)
- Former senator Don Nickles (R-OK)
- Former senator Warren Rudman (R-NH)
- Former senator Fred Thompson (R-TN), former 2008 presidential candidate

== U.S. representatives ==
- Representative Spencer Bachus (R-AL)
- Representative Michael N. Castle (R-DE)
- Representative Tom Davis (R-VA)
- Representative Lincoln Díaz-Balart (R-FL)
- Representative Mario Díaz-Balart (R-FL)
- Representative Thelma Drake (R-VA)
- Representative Jeff Flake (R-AZ)
- Representative Jeb Hensarling (R-TX)
- Representative Darrell Issa (R-CA)
- Representative Ric Keller (R-FL)
- Representative Mark Kirk (R-IL)
- Representative Ray LaHood (R-IL)
- Representative Steve LaTourette (R-OH)
- Representative Dan Lungren (R-CA)
- Representative Cathy McMorris Rodgers (R-WA)
- Representative Chip Pickering (R-MS)
- Representative Jim Ramstad (R-MN)
- Representative Rick Renzi (R-AZ)
- Representative Ileana Ros-Lehtinen (R-FL), Ranking Member of House Foreign Affairs Committee
- Representative John Shadegg (R-AZ)
- Representative Christopher Shays (R-CT)
- Representative John Shimkus (R-IL)
- Representative Fred Upton (R-MI)
- Former representative Steve Bartlett (R-TX)
- Former representative Charlie Bass (R-NH)
- Former representative Thomas Bliley (R-VA)
- Former representative Jim Courter (R-NJ)
- Former representative Joseph J. DioGuardi (R-NY)
- Former representative Charles Douglas III (R-NH)
- Former representative and ambassador Fred J. Eckert (R-NY)
- Former representative Louis Frey, Jr. (R-FL)
- Former representative Greg Ganske (R-IA)
- Former representative Barry Goldwater, Jr.
- Former representative Van Hilleary (R-TN)
- Former representative Jack Kemp (R-NY) 1996 Republican vice-presidential nominee
- Former representative Jim Kolbe (R-AZ)
- Former representative Steven Kuykendall (R-CA)
- Former representative Tom Loeffler (R-TX)
- Former representative Susan Molinari (R-NY)
- Former representative Mark Neumann (R-WI)
- Former representative Tim Penny (D-MN)
- Former representative Frank Riggs (R-CA)
- Former representative Joe Schwarz (R-MI)
- Former representative Rob Simmons (R-CT)
- Former representative Dick Zimmer (R-NJ)

== Governors ==
- Governor Charlie Crist (R-FL)
- Governor Matt Blunt (R-MO)
- Governor Mitch Daniels (R-IN)
- Governor Jim Douglas (R-VT)
- Governor John Hoeven (R-ND)
- Governor Jon Huntsman, Jr. (R-UT)
- Governor Bobby Jindal (R-LA)
- Governor Linda Lingle (R-HI)
- Governor Sarah Palin (R-AK) 2008 Republican vice-presidential nominee
- Governor Tim Pawlenty (R-MN), Chairman of the National Governors Association, National co-chair of "McCain for President"
- Governor Sonny Perdue (R-GA)
- Governor Rick Perry (R-TX)
- Governor Jodi Rell (R-CT)
- Governor Bob Riley (R-AL)
- Governor Arnold Schwarzenegger (R-CA)
- Former governor Jeb Bush (R-FL), brother to President George W. Bush, and son to former president George H. W. Bush
- Former governor Paul Cellucci (R-MA), former U.S. Ambassador to Canada
- Former governor Bill Clements (R-TX)
- Former governor George Deukmejian (R-CA)
- Former governor Donald DiFrancesco (R-NJ)
- Former governor Winfield Dunn (R-TN)
- Former governor Jim Edgar (R-IL)
- Former governor Robert L. Ehrlich (R-MD)
- Former governor Jim Gilmore (R-VA), former 2008 presidential candidate
- Former governor Mike Huckabee (R-AR), former 2008 presidential candidate
- Former governor Thomas Kean (R-NJ), 9/11 Commission Co-chair
- Former governor Frank Keating (R-OK)
- Former governor John McKernan Jr. (R-ME)
- Former governor Bill Owens (R-CO)
- Former governor George Pataki (R-NY)
- Former governor Tom Ridge (R-PA), first Secretary of Homeland Security
- Former governor Buddy Roemer (R-LA)
- Former governor Mitt Romney (R-MA), former 2008 presidential candidate
- Former governor Don Sundquist (R-TN)
- Former acting governor Jane Swift (R-MA)
- Former governor James R. Thompson (R-IL)
- Former governor Tommy Thompson (R-WI), former 2008 presidential candidate

== Retired military ==
Senator McCain was endorsed by over 100 retired generals and admirals from the U.S. Army, Navy, Air Force, and Marine Corps, among them:

- Lieutenant General John B. Conaway, USAF (Ret.), former Chief of the National Guard Bureau
- General James B. Davis, USAF (Ret.), former Chief of Staff, Supreme Headquarters Allied Powers, Europe (NATO)
- Colonel George "Bud" Day, USAF (Ret.), Medal of Honor recipient
- Rear Admiral Jeremiah Denton, USN (Ret.), Navy Cross recipient
- Admiral S. Robert Foley, USN (Ret.), former commander-in-chief, Pacific Fleet
- Admiral Ronald J. Hays, USN (Ret.), former commander-in-chief, Pacific Command
- Admiral James L. Holloway III, USN (Ret.), former Chief of Naval Operations
- Admiral Bobby Ray Inman, USN (Ret.), former director of the NSA
- Admiral Jerome L. Johnson, USN (Ret.), former Vice Chief of Naval Operations
- General James L. Jones, USMC (Ret.), former Commandant of the Marine Corps
- General P.X. Kelley, USMC (Ret.), former Commandant of the Marine Corps
- Admiral Robert J. "Barney" Kelly, USN (Ret.), former commander-in-chief, Pacific Fleet
- Admiral Frank Kelso, USN (Ret.), former chief of naval operations
- Admiral George "Gus" Kinnear, USN (Ret.), former Commander of Air Force, Atlantic Fleet
- Admiral Charles R. "Chuck" Larson, USN (Ret.), former commander-in-chief, Pacific Command
- Admiral Joseph Lopez, USN (Ret.), former commander-in-chief, U.S. Naval Forces, Europe
- Admiral James "Ace" Lyons, USN (Ret.), former commander-in-chief, Pacific Fleet
- Admiral Paul David Miller, USN (Ret.), former commander-in-chief, Atlantic Fleet
- Rear Admiral Benjamin F. Montoya, USN (Ret.), former chief of Naval Civil Engineer Corps
- General Carl E. Mundy, Jr., USMC (Ret.), former commandant of the Marine Corps
- Vice Admiral John R. Ryan, USN (Ret.), former Superintendent of the Naval Academy
- General H. Norman Schwarzkopf, USA (Ret.), former commander-in-chief, Central Command
- Admiral Leighton W. Smith, Jr., USN (Ret.), former commander-in-chief, U.S. Naval Forces, Europe
- Colonel Leo K. Thorsness, USAF (Ret.), Medal of Honor recipient
- Lieutenant General James A. Williams, USA (Ret.), former director of the Defense Intelligence Agency
- Admiral Ronald J. Zlatoper, USN (Ret.), former commander-in-chief, Pacific Fleet

== Mayors ==
- Tommy Joe Alexander of Irondale, Alabama
- Carlos Alvarez of Miami-Dade County
- Alan Autry of Fresno
- Rich Crotty of Orange County, Florida
- Richard J. Gerbounka of Linden, New Jersey (I-NJ)
- Rudy Giuliani, former mayor of New York City, former 2008 presidential candidate

== State, local, and territorial officials ==
- Jeffrey L. Barnhart, member of the North Carolina General Assembly
- Peter Bragdon, state senator in New Hampshire
- Michael Downing, state senator in New Hampshire
- John Gallus, state senator in New Hampshire
- Ted Gatsas, state senator in New Hampshire
- Fletcher L. Hartsell, Jr., state senator in North Carolina
- Leonard Lance, former member of the New Jersey General Assembly and congressional candidate
- Steven Lukan, state representative in Iowa
- Mike May, state representative in Iowa
- Bob McDonnell, Virginia attorney general
- Larry McKibben, state senator in Iowa
- John Pappageorge, state senator in Michigan
- John Putney, state senator in Iowa
- Randy Richardville, state senator in Michigan

== Other political figures ==
- George Argyros, former United States Ambassador to Spain, billionaire, and former Major League Baseball owner
- James Baker, former Secretary of State under President George H. W. Bush
- Debra Bartoshevich (D), fmr. Hillary Clinton delegate
- John Rusling Block, former secretary of agriculture
- John R. Bolton, former ambassador to the UN under President George W. Bush
- Otis R. Bowen, former Secretary of Health and Human Services and former Indiana governor
- James H. Burnley IV, former secretary of transportation
- William Thaddeus Coleman, Jr., former Secretary of Transportation under President Gerald Ford
- Lawrence Eagleburger, former Secretary of State under President George H. W. Bush
- Alexander Haig, former Secretary of State under President Ronald Reagan
- Henry Kissinger, former National Security Advisor and Secretary of State under President Richard Nixon and President Gerald Ford
- Ann McLaughlin Korologos, former Secretary of Labor, DC
- Former ambassador Thomas Patrick Melady
- Former Secretary of Commerce Robert Mosbacher
- Former Secretary of Commerce Peter George Peterson
- Former FCC chairman Michael Powell
- Karl Rove, former political advisor to President Bush
- George Shultz, former secretary of state under President Ronald Reagan
- James R. Schlesinger, former Secretary of Defense under President Richard Nixon and President Gerald Ford
- Gordon St. Angelo, former chairman of the Indiana Democratic Party
- R. James Woolsey, Jr., former CIA director under President Bill Clinton

== National figures ==
- Francis J. Beckwith, professor of Philosophy and Church-State Studies, Baylor University
- Robert Gleason, chairman of the Republican Party of Pennsylvania
- John C. Hagee, founder and senior pastor of the evangelical mega-church Cornerstone Church in San Antonio, Texas
- Former treasurer of the United States Rosario Marin (CA)

== Newspapers ==
These newspapers endorsed John McCain's general election run:

- Amarillo Globe News newspaper in Amarillo, Texas
- Antelope Valley Press newspaper in Palmdale, California
- The Arizona Republic newspaper in Phoenix, Arizona
- The Bakersfield Californian newspaper in Bakersfield, California
- The Baltimore Examiner newspaper in Baltimore, Maryland
- The Beaumont Monitor newspaper in Beaumont, Texas
- Bend Bulletin newspaper in Bend, Oregon
- The Boston Herald newspaper in Boston, Massachusetts
- The Columbus Dispatch newspaper in Columbus, Ohio
- The Corpus Christi Caller-Times newspaper in Corpus Christi, Texas
- The Daily Press newspaper in Newport News, Virginia
- The Daily Sentinel newspaper in Grand Junction, Colorado
- The Dallas Morning News newspaper in Dallas, Texas
- The Findlay Courier newspaper in Findlay, Ohio
- Foster's Daily Democrat newspaper in Dover, New Hampshire
- Goldsboro News-Argus newspaper in Goldsboro, North Carolina
- The Intelligencer newspaper in Wheeling, West Virginia
- The Johnson County Sun newspaper in Overland Park, Kansas
- The Las Vegas Review-Journal newspaper in Las Vegas, Nevada
- The Lowell Sun newspaper in Lowell, Massachusetts
- The Mining Journal newspaper in Marquette, Michigan
- Mountain Valley News newspaper in Cedaredge, Colorado
- Napa Valley Register newspaper in Napa, California
- New Hampshire Union Leader newspaper in Manchester, New Hampshire
- The New York Post newspaper in New York, New York
- The News-Gazette newspaper in Champaign, Illinois
- The Press-Enterprise newspaper in Riverside, California
- The Pueblo Chieftain newspaper in Pueblo, Colorado
- San Antonio Express-News newspaper in San Antonio, Texas
- The San Diego Union Tribune newspaper in San Diego, California
- The San Francisco Examiner newspaper in San Francisco, California
- The Spokesman Review newspaper in Spokane, Washington
- The Tampa Tribune newspaper in Tampa, Florida
- The Times of Northwest Indiana newspaper in Munster, Indiana
- Times Record News newspaper in Wichita Falls, Texas
- The Times-News newspaper in Twin Falls, Idaho
- Wheeling News Register newspaper in Wheeling, Virginia
- Winchester Star newspaper in Winchester, Virginia

== Academics ==
- Anne O. Krueger, economist and former World Bank Chief Economist
- Robert P. George, McCormick Professor of Jurisprudence at Princeton University
- Bernie Machen, president of the University of Florida

== Business people ==
- Sheldon Adelson, Las Vegas Casino billionaire
- Bradbury Anderson, Best Buy CEO
- Hoyt R. Barnett, Publix vice chairman
- August A. Busch III, former Anheuser-Busch chairman
- Pete Coors, Coors Brewing Company chairman
- Carly Fiorina, former CEO of Hewlett-Packard
- Steve Forbes, magazine publisher, former GOP presidential candidate (1996, 2000)
- Deal W. Hudson, conservative publisher
- Tom Monaghan, founder of Domino's Pizza
- Frederick W. Smith, founder, chairman, president, and CEO of FedEx
- Donald Trump, chairman and CEO of the Trump Organization and future U.S. president
- Robert Ulrich, Target chairman and CEO
- Michael D. White, Pepsi vice chairman
- Meg Whitman, former CEO of eBay
- Bob Wright, former NBC Universal chairman and CEO

== Entertainers ==
- María Conchita Alonso, actress
- Stephen Baldwin, actor
- Pat Boone, singer
- Powers Boothe, actor
- Wilford Brimley, actor
- Jerry Bruckheimer, producer
- James Caan, actor
- Dean Cain, actor
- Adam Carolla, comedian, television and radio host
- Lacey Chabert, actress
- Jon Cryer, actor
- Daddy Yankee (Ramon Ayala), musician
- Charlie Daniels, musician
- Robert Davi, actor
- Robert Duvall, actor
- Clint Eastwood, actor and director
- Erik Estrada, actor
- Joe Eszterhas, screenwriter
- Lou Ferrigno, actor and bodybuilder
- Kelsey Grammer, actor
- Lee Greenwood, musician, often performed "God Bless the USA" at McCain/Palin rallies
- Angie Harmon, actress
- Elisabeth Hasselbeck, co-host of The View
- Patricia Heaton, actress
- Victoria Jackson, comedian
- Lorenzo Lamas, actor
- Blackie Lawless, musician
- Gerald McRaney, actor
- MF Doom, rapper
- Dennis Miller, comedian
- Heidi Montag, Hollywood figure
- Craig T. Nelson, actor
- George Newbern, actor
- Chuck Norris, actor
- Ted Nugent, hard rock guitarist
- Gail O'Grady, actress
- John Ondrasik, singer
- Joe Perry, guitarist for Aerosmith
- John Ratzenberger, actor
- John Rich, musician
- Shauna Sand, actress
- Tom Selleck, actor
- Gary Sinise, actor
- Kevin Sorbo, actor
- Sylvester Stallone, actor
- Connie Stevens, actress
- Billy Squier, singer
- Rip Torn, actor
- Cowboy Troy, musician
- Janine Turner, actress and author
- Dick Van Patten, actor
- Jon Voight, actor
- Hank Williams, Jr. musician, often performed at McCain/Palin rallies
- Gretchen Wilson, musician, often performed at McCain/Palin rallies
- James Woods, actor
- David Zucker, director

=== Foreign entertainers ===
- Eduardo Verástegui, Mexican actor

=== Adult entertainment ===
- Gauge, porn star
- Teri Weigel, porn star

== Athletes and sportspeople ==
- Troy Aikman, former Dallas Cowboys quarterback
- George Bodenheimer, ESPN president
- Bryan Clay, Olympic gold medalist in decathlon
- Bill Davidson, owner of the Detroit Pistons
- Mike Ditka, ESPN NFL analyst, former Chicago Bears and New Orleans Saints head coach
- John Elway, Hall of Fame Denver Broncos quarterback
- Al Leiter, former MLB pitcher
- Chuck Liddell, MMA fighter
- Colette Nelson, IFBB professional bodybuilder
- Brady Quinn, Cleveland Browns quarterback
- Nolan Ryan, Hall of Fame MLB pitcher
- Curt Schilling, Boston Red Sox pitcher
- Jason Sehorn, retired New York Giants cornerback
- Roger Staubach, Hall of Fame Dallas Cowboys quarterback
- Joe Thomas, Cleveland Browns offensive tackle

== Organizations ==
- Al-Hesbah
- Conservative Voice
- Log Cabin Republicans
- National Rifle Association of America
- Republicans for Environmental Protection

== Other individuals ==
- Morris J. Amitay, AIPAC
- David Frum, journalist
- Charles Krauthammer, conservative political pundit
- Michael Savage, radio host
- Samuel Joseph Wurzelbacher, "Joe the Plumber"

== Foreign political figures ==
- David Cameron, member of the British Conservative Party and future prime minister of the United Kingdom
- Wilfried Martens, president of the European People's Party

== See also ==
- Congressional endorsements for the 2008 United States presidential election
- Newspaper endorsements in the United States presidential primaries, 2008
- List of Barack Obama presidential campaign endorsements, 2008
- List of Hillary Clinton 2008 presidential campaign endorsements
- List of Ron Paul 2008 presidential endorsements
- McCain Democrat
