= Obama–Trump voters =

Type of voter in United States elections

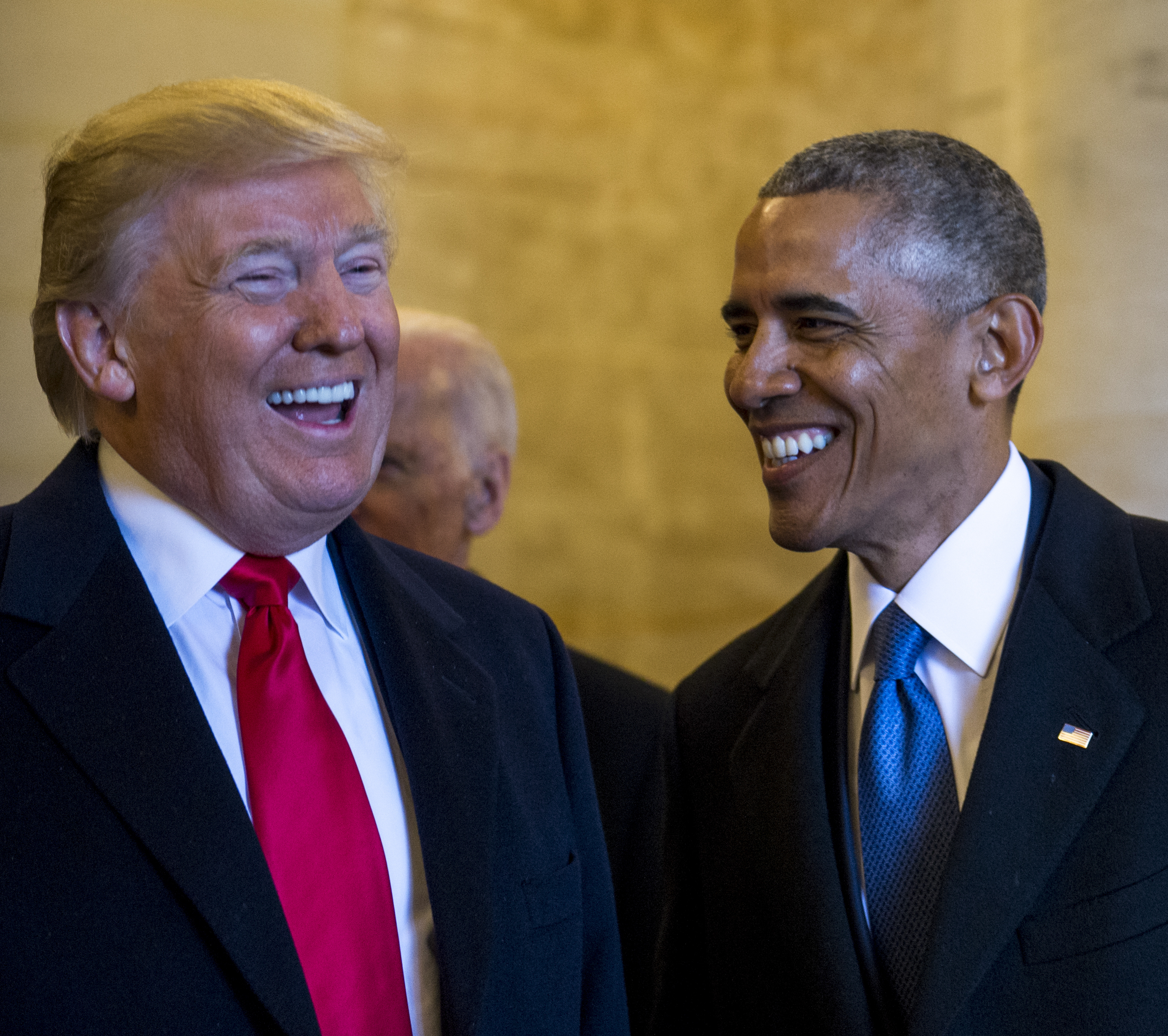
Donald Trump (left) and Barack Obama (right) together on the former's inauguration day, January 20, 2017

In the United States, Obama–Trump voters, sometimes referred to as Trump Democrats or Obama Republicans, are people who voted for Democratic Party nominee Barack Obama in the 2008 or 2012 presidential elections, but later voted for Republican Party nominee Donald Trump in 2016, 2020 or 2024. Data shows that in 2016, these voters comprised roughly 13% of Trump voters. In 2012, this segment of voters made up 9% of total Obama voters. Seven percent of 2012 Obama voters did not vote at all in 2016, and 3% voted for a third-party candidate. While some analysts consider Obama–Trump voters to have been decisive in Trump's 2016 victory, others have disputed this conclusion.

According to research done by the Democracy Fund Voter Study Group, compared to other voters, Obama–Trump voters have progressive economic views and conservative social views. However, 75 percent of them supported repealing and replacing the Affordable Care Act (Obamacare) according to another survey. Though these voters supported Trump in the 2016, 2020 and 2024 elections, they are less supportive of Republicans as a whole, and show a desire to change the status quo.

== Studies ==
Various studies estimate the percentage of 2016 Trump voters, who had previously voted for Obama, at between 11 and 15 percent. The Cooperative Congressional Election Study (CCES) found that 11% of 2016 Trump voters had voted for Obama in 2012, with the American National Election Study putting the number at 13%, and the University of Virginia Center for Politics estimating 15%. Expressed in total number of voters, these percentages indicate that between 7 and 9 million 2016 Trump voters voted for Obama in 2012.

According to a May 2017 McClatchy news report, an analysis by Democratic political firm Global Strategy Group estimated that Obama–Trump voters accounted for more than two-thirds of Obama voters who did not vote for Hillary Clinton.

In 2021, a Jacobin study found that while Joe Biden eked out a narrow victory in the 2020 presidential election by winning high vote totals in college educated metropolitan areas, Trump continued to increase his votes in both white and non-white non-college-educated counties which had previously shifted from Obama to Trump.

A 2024 Navigator Research analysis showed that Donald Trump continued to gain even more support in the important demographic groups of Black and Latino men, and voters experiencing financial hardship, building further on gains Trump achieved in these demographics from 2016 to 2020.

== Significance ==
Wisconsin from 2012 through to 2020. Voters in the western, northern and southeastern parts of the state that had voted for Barack Obama in 2012 had swung to Donald Trump in 2016 and predominantly stuck with Trump in 2020. This correlated closely with the state's white, working class populations, who had gone from supporting Mitt Romney 52 to 47 percent in 2012 to supporting Trump 56 to 38 percent in 2016. This pattern continued into 2020, with Trump continuing to win economically-depressed white Obama counties such as Racine and Kenosha.

Some analysts have argued that Obama–Trump voters had a disproportionately large impact on the 2016 election because they were concentrated in key swing states in the Midwest while others have said they were actually "Obama Republicans" rather than Democrats to begin with.

Some have disputed both the quantity and the significance of Obama–Trump voters in deciding the outcome of the 2016 election. Dana Milbank argued in an August 2017 Washington Post column that the number of such voters was initially overstated and that most of them were Republicans who only defected from their party to vote for Obama, not Democrats who defected to support Trump. Nate Cohn countered Milbank's assessment by arguing that Milbank's focus on national data obscured the magnitude of Democratic defection in 2016 to support Trump. Cohn noted that when looking specifically at white Obama voters with no higher education than a high school diploma, Clinton won only 74% (based on data from the Democracy Fund Voter Study Group) or 78% (based on the Cooperative Congressional Election Study).

In a 2021 interview about their book Trump's Democrats, Stephanie Muravchik and Jon A. Shields noted that many Obama–Trump voters likewise voted for Trump in the 2020 election, in some counties in even larger numbers than in 2016. Muravchik and Shields assessed that these "flipped" Democrats would continue to be a key factor in future elections.

In November 2024, Newsweek reported evidence from Donald Trump's successful 2024 presidential election bid, which showed that key voter demographic groups, particularly low income non-college educated voters, who had previously voted for Obama, had maintained their support for Trump.

== Voters' views ==
Shortly before the 2016 election, The New York Times reported that Obama voters who planned to vote for Trump felt he embodied the "change" they had hoped for when they voted for Obama. Multiple focus groups of Obama–Trump voters convened by the Roosevelt Institute and Democracy Corps in early 2017 showed that in general these voters wanted to change the status quo and had skeptical views of Congressional Republicans and their proposals. The same focus groups also indicated that these voters hoped then-President Trump would help reduce health care costs for working-class Americans, and that they were anxious about some immigrant groups.

A multi-year survey completed by the Democracy Fund Voter Study Group found that Obama–Trump voters generally had liberal views on economic issues, but conservative views on social issues. In a 2017 editorial for New York Magazine, Eric Levitz noted that data from the CCES indicates 75% of Obama–Trump voters supported repealing and replacing the Affordable Care Act.

According to an article in Politico, a September 2017 Democracy Fund Voter Study Group poll found that 70% of Obama–Trump voters approved of the job Trump was doing as president. This figure was significantly lower than the 88% approval rating among all Trump voters. Similarly, the percent of voters who disapproved of Trump's performance in this poll was much higher among Obama–Trump voters (22%) than among Trump voters as a whole (9%).

In the 2020 U.S. presidential election, which saw record turnouts of both Republicans and Democrats, Trump received millions more votes than he had received in 2016, including an overall increase in votes from people of color, despite losing the election to Democrat Joe Biden, who was Obama's running mate in both 2008 and 2012 presidential elections. Likewise, Biden received more votes than did Hillary Clinton in 2016.

A 2024 Navigator Research post-election survey showed that the dynamics and voter demographics involved in the shift of voters from Obama to Trump in 2016 and 2020, continued in the same trajectory into 2024, with Trump gaining further increases in votes from younger voters, working class voters concerned about economic problems, and non-white male voters.

== Swing states in presidential elections ==
During this post-Obama electoral era, Florida, Iowa, and Ohio, once swing states, became stronghold red states. These states voted for Obama in 2008 and 2012, and voted for Trump in 2016, 2020, and 2024. In contrast, the Sun Belt states of Arizona and Georgia, once stronghold red states, became swing states. These states voted for Trump in 2016 and 2024, and voted for Biden in 2020. The Rust Belt states of Michigan, Pennsylvania, and Wisconsin, once blue-leaning states (formerly part of the "blue wall"), became swing states. These states voted for Obama in 2008 and 2012, voted for Trump in 2016 and 2024, and voted for Biden in 2020. Indiana and North Carolina voted for Obama once 2008, voted for Romney in 2012, and voted for Trump in 2016, 2020, and 2024. Nevada voted for Obama in 2008 and 2012, voted for Clinton in 2016, voted for Biden in 2020, and voted for Trump once in 2024.

Year	Arizona	Florida	Georgia	Indiana	Iowa	Michigan	Nevada	North Carolina	Ohio	Pennsylvania	Wisconsin
2008	McCain	Obama	McCain	Obama	Obama	Obama	Obama	Obama	Obama	Obama	Obama
2012	Romney	Obama	Romney	Romney	Obama	Obama	Obama	Romney	Obama	Obama	Obama
2016	Trump	Trump	Trump	Trump	Trump	Trump	Clinton	Trump	Trump	Trump	Trump
2020	Biden	Trump	Biden	Trump	Trump	Biden	Biden	Trump	Trump	Biden	Biden
2024	Trump	Trump	Trump	Trump	Trump	Trump	Trump	Trump	Trump	Trump	Trump
Year	Arizona	Florida	Georgia	Indiana	Iowa	Michigan	Nevada	North Carolina	Ohio	Pennsylvania	Wisconsin

Key

Democratic Party nominee
Republican Party nominee

== See also ==
- Essex man
- List of Democrats who opposed the Hillary Clinton 2016 presidential campaign
- Reagan Democrat
- Red wall (British politics)
- Republican and conservative support for Barack Obama in 2008
- Sanders–Trump voters
- Workington man
