= Country club Republican =

American pejorative term

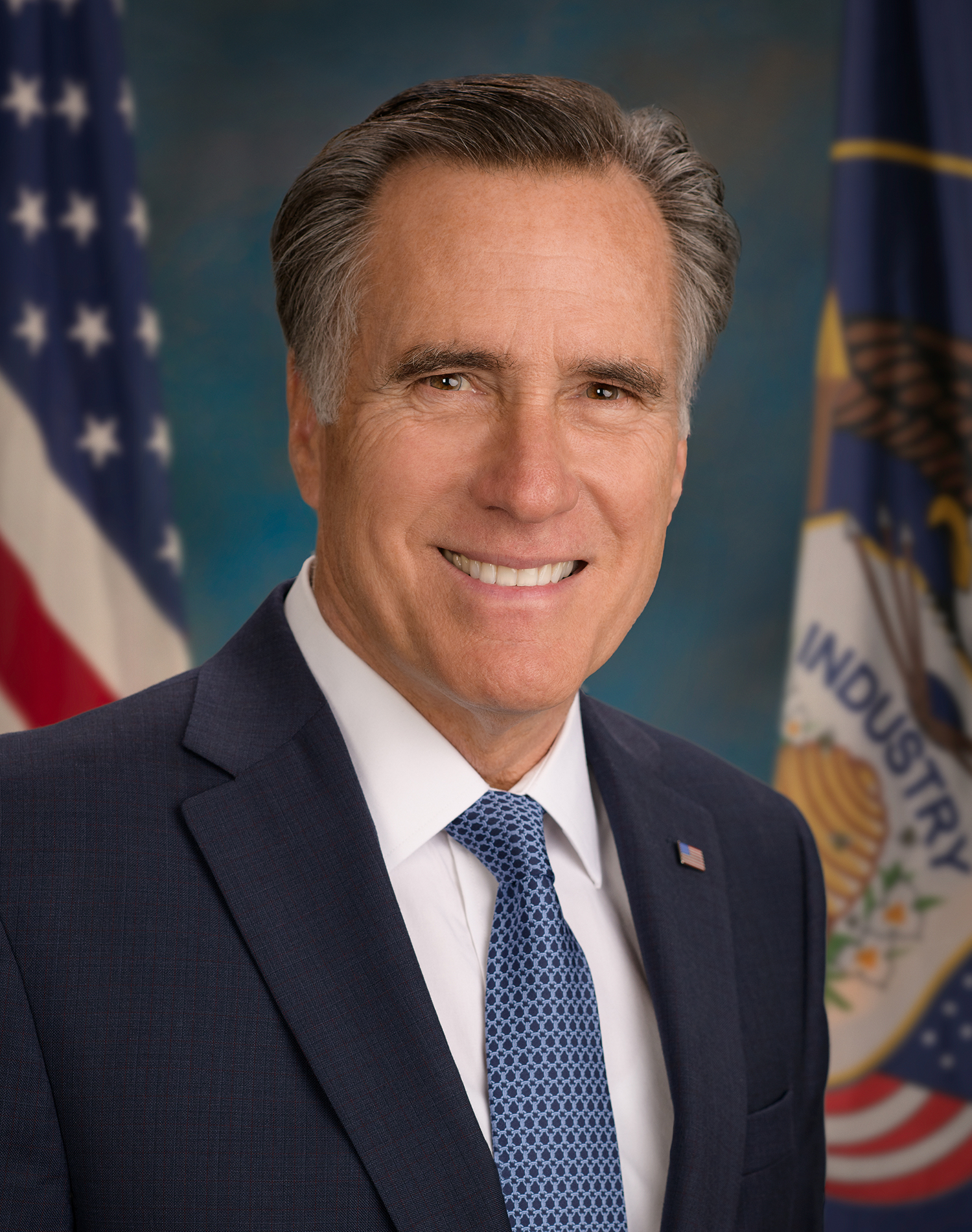
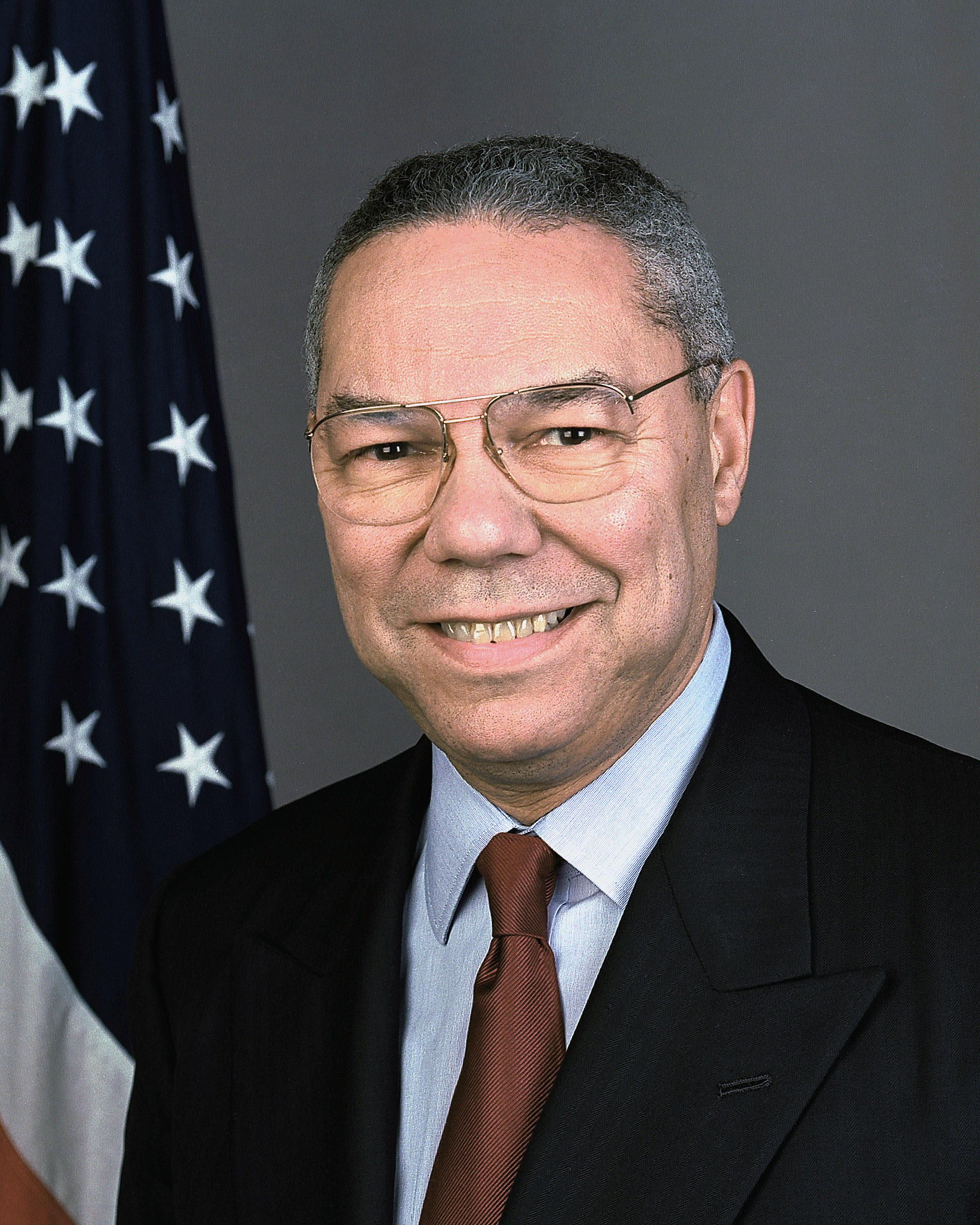
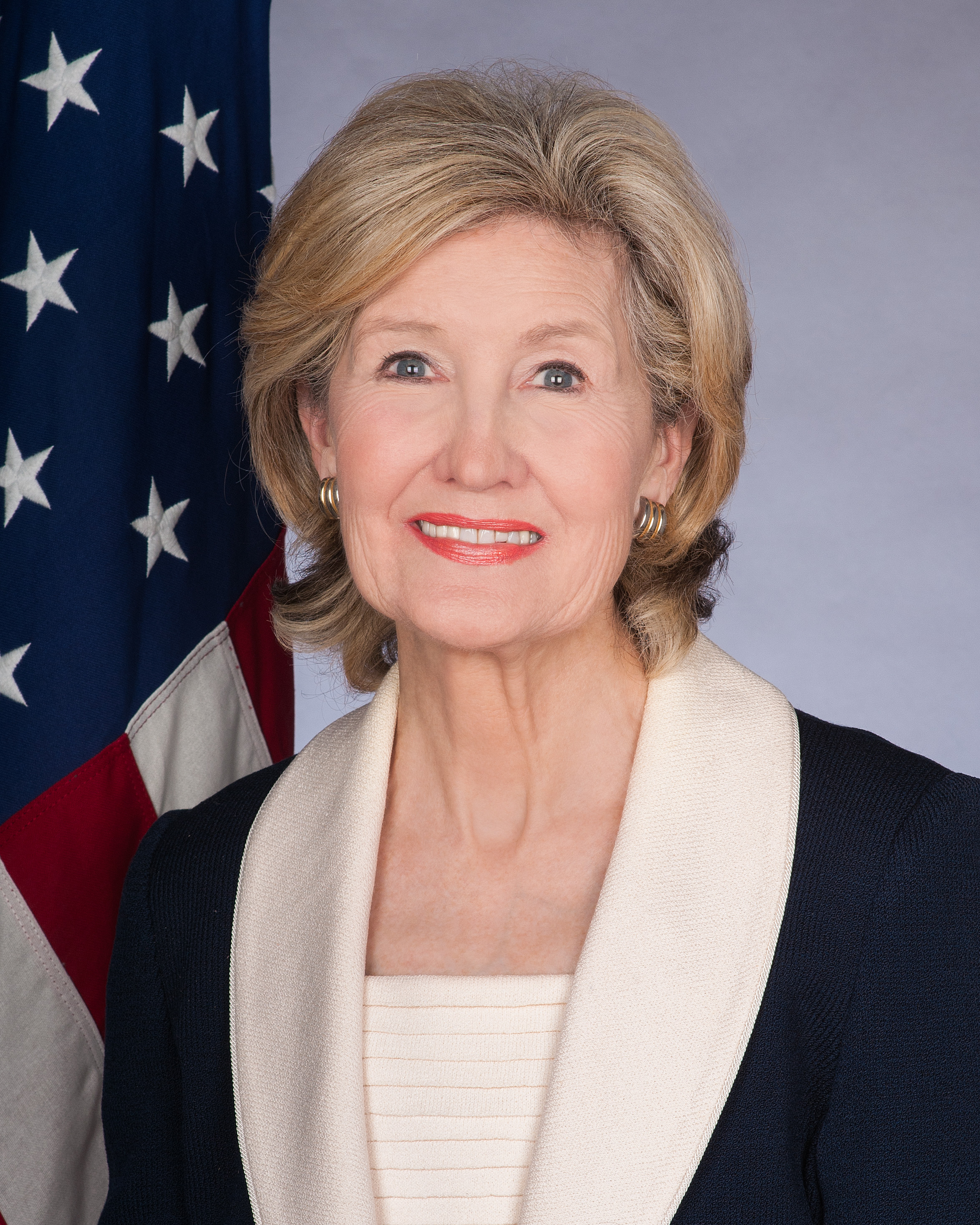
Notable figures often described as country club Republicans. From left to right: George H. W. Bush, Mitt Romney, Colin Powell, Kay Bailey Hutchison.

A country club Republican, also known as a country club conservative or establishment Republican, is a term, usually used pejoratively, to describe certain members of the Republican Party in the United States. The label is typically applied to Republicans who are perceived as being from higher socioeconomic backgrounds, often with inherited wealth, and who hail from politically or socially prominent families. These individuals are generally fiscally conservative but hold liberal, moderate, or indifferent positions on social issues such as abortion, censorship, and gay rights. Country club Republicans are also more likely than other party members to have attended prestigious colleges and universities.

== Characteristics ==
Country club Republicans have historically been associated with the White Anglo-Saxon Protestant (WASP) establishment that once dominated the political and economic life of the United States. This group was considered the closest thing to an American aristocracy, with privilege and influence based on lineage and old money. The archetype is often seen as fiscally conservative but socially moderate or liberal, sometimes indifferent to social issues altogether.

The term is frequently used to contrast this group with more populist, socially conservative, or grassroots elements within the Republican Party. While the country club Republican is often depicted as part of the party's moderate or centrist wing, the label is sometimes used to criticize perceived elitism or detachment from the concerns of working-class voters.

== History ==
The country club Republican archetype rose to prominence in the early and mid-20th century, when the Republican Party's leadership and donor base were dominated by wealthy, socially prominent families, particularly in the Northeast. The group overlapped with the so-called Rockefeller Republicans, who were center-right on economic issues and more liberal on social issues.

By the late 20th century, the influence of country club Republicans declined as the party's base expanded to include more socially conservative and populist constituencies, particularly in the South and West. The rise of new economic elites and increased social mobility also diminished the dominance of the old WASP establishment.

During the 2008 election, Barack Obama successfully drew support from some Republicans and moderate conservatives due to his charismatic communication style, appeals for national unity, and frustration with the existing political establishment. Many of these crossover voters—sometimes referred to as "Obamacons" or "Obama Republicans"—crossed party lines for specific reasons.

== Notable figures ==
Prominent politicians often identified as country club Republicans include:

- George H. W. Bush, 41st President of the United States (1989–1993)
- Mitt Romney, former Governor of Massachusetts (2003–2007) and U.S. Senator from Utah (2019–2025)
- Adam Kinzinger, politician, political commentator, and former United States Air Force and Air National Guard officer.
- Arnold Schwarzenegger, actor, businessman, politician, and former Governor of California (2003-2011)
- Michael Bloomberg, former New York City Mayor (2002-2013)
- Condoleezza Rice, former National Security Advisor and 66th United States Secretary of State
- David Frum, journalist, Republican speechwriter and columnist
- Thomas Kean, former Governor of New Jersey (1982–1990)
- Kay Bailey Hutchison, former U.S. Senator from Texas (1993–2013)
- Colin Powell, former National Security Advisor and 65th United States Secretary of State
- Charlie Baker, former Governor of Massachusetts (2015–2023)
- Larry Hogan, former Governor of Maryland (2015–2023)
- Gerald Ford, 38th President of the United States (1974–1977)

== See also ==
- Rockefeller Republican
- Republican and conservative support for Barack Obama in 2008
