= Newspaper endorsements in the 2008 United States presidential primaries =

Newspapers in the United States have traditionally endorsed candidates for party nomination prior to their final endorsements for president. Below is the list of endorsements in 2008, by candidate, for each primary race.

== Democrats ==
=== Dennis Kucinich ===
- The Nation Magazine (after a poll of visitors on its website)

=== Joe Biden ===
- The Storm Lake Times Storm Lake, Iowa

=== Hillary Clinton ===
- Akron Beacon Journal
- Anniston Star
- Bend Bulletin newspaper in Bend, Oregon
- Buffalo News
- Burlington Hawk Eye newspaper in Burlington, Iowa
- Cabinet Press group of weekly newspapers in New Hampshire which includes: The Milford Cabinet, Bedford Journal, Hollis Brookline Journal and Merrimack Journal
- The Citizen (Laconia, NH)
- Cape Cod Times newspaper in Cape Cod Massachusetts
- Columbus Dispatch
- The Commercial Appeal (Memphis, TN)
- Concord Monitor newspaper in Concord, New Hampshire
- The New York Blade, an LGBT newspaper in New York City, New York
- The Daily Texan, student newspaper of the University of Texas
- The Daily Pennsylvanian college newspaper at the University of Pennsylvania
- Denver Post
- The Des Moines Register
- El Mundo, Spanish-language newspaper in Nevada
- El Mundo, Spanish-language newspaper group in San Francisco, California
- Foster's Daily Democrat newspaper in Dover, New Hampshire
- The Hartford Courant
- Indianapolis Star (Indianapolis, Indiana)
- Irish Voice Irish American Newspaper in the United States
- The Jersey Journal
- Kansas City Star newspaper in Kansas City, Missouri
- Keene Sentinel newspaper in Keene, New Hampshire
- Laconia Citizen newspaper in Laconia, New Hampshire
- Laredo Morning Times newspaper in Laredo, Texas
- Las Vegas Sun newspaper in Las Vegas, Nevada
- The Montgomery Advertiser
- The Sun News, newspaper in Myrtle Beach, South Carolina
- The New York Amsterdam News
- Newsday
- New York Times
- Pittsburgh Tribune-Review
- Orlando Sentinel newspaper in Orlando, Florida
- Plymouth Record Enterprise newspaper in Plymouth, New Hampshire
- Post News Group newspaper group family in Berkeley, California, Oakland, California, Richmond, California, San Francisco, California and San Jose, California
- Quad City Times, newspaper in the Quad Cities in Iowa
- Salmon Press group of weekly newspapers in New Hampshire which includes: The Littleton Courier, Coos County Democrat (Lancaster, NH), Berlin Reporter, Granite State News (Wolfeboro, NH), Carroll County Independent (Conway, NH), Meredith News, Record Enterprise (Plymouth, NH), Winnisquam Echo (Tilton, NH), Gilford Steamer, Baysider (Alton, NH), and The Mountain Ear
- The Salt Lake Tribune, newspaper in Salt Lake City, Utah
- Statesman Journal, newspaper in Salem, Oregon
- The Times Union (Albany, NY)
- The Vinton Eagle weekly newspaper in Benton County, Iowa
- Washington Blade, an LGBT newspaper in Washington, D.C.
- The Zanesville Times Recorder, a newspaper in Zanesville, Ohio

=== John Edwards ===
- The Fresno Bee, daily newspaper of Fresno, California
- Valley News Today, Shenandoah, Iowa

=== Barack Obama ===
- Albuquerque Journal newspaper in Albuquerque, New Mexico
- Ames Iowa State Daily newspaper in Ames, Iowa
- The Arizona Republic newspaper in Phoenix, Arizona
- The Aspen Times newspaper in Aspen, Colorado
- AsianWeek magazine
- Atlanta Daily World newspaper in Atlanta, Georgia
- Atlanta Journal-Constitution newspaper in Atlanta, Georgia
- Austin American Statesman
- The Baltimore Sun newspaper in Baltimore, Maryland
- Belleville News-Democrat newspaper in Belleville, Illinois
- The Bergen County Record newspaper in Hackensack, New Jersey
- The Birmingham News newspaper in Birmingham, Alabama
- Black Voice News newspaper
- The Boston Bay State Banner newspaper in Boston, Massachusetts
- Boston Globe newspaper in Boston, Massachusetts
- The Boston Phoenix newspaper in Boston, Massachusetts
- The Charlotte Observer newspaper in Charlotte, North Carolina
- Chicago Defender newspaper in Chicago, Illinois
- Chicago Sun Times newspaper in Chicago, Illinois
- Chicago Tribune newspaper in Chicago, Illinois
- Chico News & Review newspaper in Chico, California
- Colorado Springs Independent newspaper in Colorado Springs, Colorado
- The Columbian newspaper in Vancouver, Washington
- Connecticut Post newspaper in Bridgeport, Connecticut
- Contra Costa Times newspaper in Walnut Creek, California
- Corpus Christi Caller-Times newspaper in Corpus Christi, Texas
- The Courier-Journal newspaper in Louisville, Kentucky
- Daily Herald newspaper in Arlington Heights, Illinois
- The Daily News Tribune newspaper in Waltham, Massachusetts
- The Daily Star newspaper in Oneonta, New York
- Dallas Morning News newspaper in Dallas, Texas
- The Day newspaper in New London, Connecticut
- The Desert Sun newspaper in Palm Springs, California
- El Latino, Spanish-language newspaper in Des Moines, Iowa
- El Paso Times newspaper in El Paso, Texas
- Elko Daily Free Press newspaper in Elko, Nevada
- Financial Times newspaper in London, England
- Fort Worth Star-Telegram newspaper in Fort Worth, Texas
- The Free Lance-Star newspaper in Fredericksburg, Virginia
- Fresno Bee newspaper in Fresno, California
- The Gainesville Sun newspaper in Gainesville, Florida
- Gay City News LGBT newspaper in New York City
- The Greenville News newspaper in Greenville, South Carolina
- The Honolulu Advertiser newspaper in Honolulu, Hawaii
- Houston Chronicle newspaper in Houston, Texas
- Hoy Spanish-language newspaper in Chicago, Illinois
- Inland Valley Daily Bulletin newspaper in Pomona Valley
- The Daily Iowan student newspaper of the University of Iowa
- Iowa City Press-Citizen newspaper in Iowa City, Iowa
- Jewish News of Greater Phoenix newspaper in Phoenix, Arizona
- Joplin Globe newspaper in Joplin, Missouri
- Juneau Empire newspaper in Juneau, Alaska
- Knoxville News Sentinel newspaper in Knoxville, Tennessee
- Las Vegas Review-Journal newspaper in Las Vegas, Nevada
- The Littleton Courier newspaper in Littleton, New Hampshire
- Little India magazine
- Logan Herald-Observer newspaper in Logan, Iowa
- Los Alamos Monitor newspaper in Los Alamos County, New Mexico
- Los Angeles Daily News newspaper in Los Angeles, California
- Los Angeles Sentinel newspaper in Los Angeles, California
- Los Angeles Times newspaper in Los Angeles, California
- Los Angeles Wave newspaper in Los Angeles, California
- Marin Independent Journal newspaper in Marin County, California
- Memphis Tri-State Defender newspaper in Memphis, Tennessee
- Merced Sun-Star newspaper in Merced, California
- Milwaukee Journal Sentinel newspaper in Milwaukee, Wisconsin
- Minnesota Daily student newspaper for the University of Minnesota
- The Modesto Bee newspaper in Modesto, California
- The Morning Call newspaper in Allentown, Pennsylvania
- Mundo Latino, Spanish language newspaper in Sioux City, Iowa
- The Nashua Telegraph newspaper in Nashua, New Hampshire
- Native American Times, newspaper based in Oklahoma
- New Haven Register newspaper in New Haven, Connecticut
- The New York Observer newspaper in New York City
- New York Post newspaper in New York, New York
- North Bay Bohemian newspaper in North Bay, California
- North Coast Journal newspaper in Humboldt County, California
- Norwich Bulletin newspaper in Norwich, Connecticut
- The Oakland Tribune newspaper in Oakland, California
- La Opinión Spanish language newspaper in Los Angeles, California
- The Oregonian newspaper in Portland, Oregon
- Ottumwa Courier newspaper in Ottumwa, Iowa
- Pacific Sun newspaper in Marin County, California
- The Palm Beach Post newspaper in Palm Beach County, Florida
- Paradise Post newspaper in Paradise, California
- Pasadena Star-News newspaper in Pasadena, California
- Pensacola News Journal newspaper in Pensacola, Florida
- Peoria Journal Star newspaper in Peoria, Illinois
- Philadelphia City Paper, newspaper in Philadelphia, Pennsylvania
- Philadelphia Daily News, newspaper in Philadelphia, Pennsylvania
- The Philadelphia Inquirer, newspaper in Philadelphia, Pennsylvania
- Philadelphia Tribune, newspaper in Philadelphia, Pennsylvania
- Philadelphia Weekly, newspaper in Philadelphia, Pennsylvania
- Pittsburgh Post-Gazette, newspaper in Pittsburgh, Pennsylvania
- The Plain Dealer newspaper in Cleveland, Ohio
- Portland Press Herald newspaper in Portland, Maine
- The Portsmouth Herald newspaper in Portsmouth, New Hampshire
- Post-Tribune newspaper in Gary, Indiana
- The Press Democrat newspaper in Santa Rosa, California
- The Press-Enterprise newspaper in Inland Empire, California
- The Record newspaper in Stockton, California
- Reno Gazette-Journal newspaper in Reno, Nevada
- Rochester City Newspaper newspaper in Rochester, New York
- The Rock Hill Herald newspaper in Rock Hill, South Carolina
- The Rockford Register Star newspaper in Rockford, Illinois
- Sacramento Bee newspaper in Sacramento, California
- San Francisco Bay Guardian newspaper in San Francisco, California
- San Francisco Chronicle newspaper in San Francisco, California
- San Jose Mercury News newspaper in San Jose, California
- Santa Barbara Independent newspaper in Santa Barbara, California
- Santa Cruz Sentinel newspaper in Santa Cruz, California
- Santa Fe New Mexican newspaper in Santa Fe, New Mexico
- Sacramento News & Review newspaper in Sacramento, California
- San Antonio Express-News newspaper in San Antonio, Texas
- San Diego CityBeat newspaper in San Diego, California
- San Francisco Bay View newspaper in San Francisco, California
- Santa Fe Reporter newspaper in Santa Fe, New Mexico
- SC Black News newspaper in South Carolina
- Seattle Post-Intelligencer newspaper in Seattle, Washington
- The Seattle Times newspaper in Seattle, Washington
- Selma Times-Journal newspaper in Selma, Alabama
- Sioux City Journal newspaper in Sioux City, Iowa
- South Florida Sun-Sentinel newspaper in Fort Lauderdale, Florida
- Southern Voice LGBT newspaper in Atlanta, Georgia
- The Springfield Republican newspaper in Springfield, Massachusetts
- St. Louis Post-Dispatch newspaper in St. Louis, Missouri
- St. Petersburg Times newspaper in St. Petersburg, Florida
- The Star-Ledger newspaper in Newark, New Jersey
- The Star Press newspaper in Muncie, Indiana
- The State newspaper in Columbia, South Carolina
- The Stranger newspaper in Seattle, Washington
- TimesDaily newspaper in Florence, Alabama
- Times-Republican, newspaper in Marshalltown, Iowa
- Times-Standard newspaper in Eureka, California
- The Times-Tribune newspaper in Scranton, Pennsylvania
- The Toledo Blade newspaper in Toledo, Ohio
- The Trenton Times newspaper in Trenton, New Jersey
- Tuscaloosa News newspaper in Tuscaloosa, Alabama
- Valley News newspaper in Lebanon, New Hampshire
- Woodbine Twiner newspaper in Woodbine, Iowa

== Republicans ==
=== Mike Huckabee ===
- Dallas Morning News
- Adel Dallas Co. News
- Albia Union-Republican
- Chariton Leader
- Iowa City Press-Citizen
- Sheldon N'West Iowa Review
- Shenandoah Valley News Today

=== John McCain ===
- Austin American Statesman
- The Arizona Republic
- Bradenton Herald (FL)
- Boston Herald (MA)
- Boston Globe
- Daytona Beach News-Journal
- Detroit News
- Gainesville Sun (FL)
- Kansas City Star
- Los Angeles Daily News
- The Modesto Bee
- New Hampshire Union Leader
- The New York Times
- Norwich Bulletin
- Oakland Tribune
- La Opinión
- The Oregonian newspaper in Portland, Oregon
- Orlando Sentinel
- The Palm Beach Post
- Pensacola News Journal (FL)
- Philadelphia Inquirer newspaper in Philadelphia, Pennsylvania
- The Polk County Democrat (FL)
- The Press-Enterprise
- The Springfield Republican
- Sacramento Bee
- St. Louis Post-Dispatch newspaper in St. Louis, Missouri
- St. Petersburg Times
- San Jose Mercury News
- Santa Cruz Sentinel newspaper in Santa Cruz, California
- The Seattle Post-Intelligencer newspaper in Seattle, Washington
- The Seattle Times
- The South Florida Sun-Sentinel (FL)
- The Star-Ledger (NJ)
- Tampa Tribune
- Tuscaloosa News newspaper in Tuscaloosa, Alabama
- Waltham (MA) Daily News Tribune

=== Ron Paul ===
- The Arab American News
- The American Conservative
- The Muslim Observer - national newspaper
- Pacific Sun
- San Francisco Bay Guardian

=== Mitt Romney ===
- National Review
- The Daily Nonpareil (IA)
- The Times-Republican (IA)
- Sioux City Journal (IA)
- The Grand Rapids Press (MI)
- The Oakland Press (MI)
- Las Vegas Review-Journal (NV)
- Reno Gazette-Journal (NV)
- Elko Daily Free Press (NV)
- The Atlanta Journal-Constitution (GA)
- Hartford Courant (CT)
- Salt Lake Tribune (UT)
- The Denver Post (CO)
- Long Beach Press-Telegram (CA)

=== Fred Thompson ===
- Human Events
