= Democracy Fund =

- Formation: 2011
- Founder: Pierre Omidyar
- Type: Private foundation
- Purpose: Activism
- Headquarters: 1200 17th Street NW Suite 300, Washington, D.C. 20036
- President: Joe Goldman
- Revenue: $64 million (2024)
- Expenses: $61.6 million (2024)
- Endowment: $15.8 million (2024)
- Website: www.democracyfund.org

The Democracy Fund is a charitable foundation created by eBay founder Pierre Omidyar in 2011. It has been an independent private foundation since 2014. Its stated aim is to improve the democratic process in the United States so that it better benefits voters. Its activities include awarding grants to organizations it believes will further its goal. It created the Voter Study Group, which surveyed 8,000 American voters on their political and social views.
