= Doreen Howard =

American politician

Member of the New Hampshire House of Representatives from the 12th district
- In office 2006–2010

Personal details
- Party: Democratic

Doreen Howard (born) is a Democratic former member of the New Hampshire House of Representatives who represented the Rockingham 12th district from 2006 to 2010.

She was raised in Newmarket. During her tenure as a state representative, she co-sponsored several bills including legislation for the continued surveillance of Eastern equine encephalitis, New Hampshire Medal of Honor, and respect for funerals.

On March 15, 2007, she endorsed Sen. Hillary Clinton in her bid for the presidency. However, after Clinton ended her campaign and endorsed Sen. Barack Obama, Howard decided to support the Republican presidential nominee, Sen. John McCain, saying, "Both Clinton and McCain put country first and that’s critically important".

Howard served on the State-Federal Relations and Veterans Affairs Committee, and is the regional coordinator for New Hampshire Women's Indoor Tennis.

She has a bachelor's degree in dietetics and an associate's degree in culinary arts. She is married with three grown sons.
