= Mountain Valley News =

- Type: Weekly newspaper
- Format: Tabloid
- Owner(s): Advantage Holdings, Inc.
- Founder: Harry Straub
- Publisher: Bob Cox
- Editor: Bob Cox
- Founded: 1992
- Ceased publication: 2013
- Language: English
- Headquarters: Cedaredge, CO
- Circulation: 1,800 (as of 2013)

The Mountain Valley News was a weekly newspaper published on Wednesdays based in Cedaredge, Colorado covering Delta County, Colorado, United States.

== History ==
The Mountain Valley News was founded in 1992 as a newsletter published by Harry Straub. The newspaper was sold to publisher Anne Chastain in 2000, and again the following year to J.B. Smith.

Advantage Holdings, Inc. bought the Mountain Valley News in 2002. The newspaper published its final edition on Sept. 25, 2013.
