= Elaine Lafferty =

American journalist

Elaine Lafferty is an American journalist and the former editor of Ms. magazine. She was a Hillary Clinton supporter who advised the McCain-Palin campaign in 2008.

Lafferty was a staff correspondent for Time magazine contributing to over 30 cover stories. While at Time, she covered the O. J. Simpson criminal and civil trials, as well as the Unabomber case, the Polly Klass murder case and many others. She joined the Dublin-based Irish Times in 1998, and covered conflicts and wars in Kosovo, the Middle East and Afghanistan and Pakistan. As editor of Ms., she led the magazine to its first National Magazine Award nomination in 17 years in 2005. Lafferty also served as a features editor at More magazine. Lafferty is a contributor to The Daily Beast/Newsweek. In 2011, she headed up social media and communications for the Diana Nyad Expedition, the athlete's attempt to swim from Cuba to Florida.

Laffterty is co-author of My Turn at the Bully Pulpit with Greta Van Susteren.
