= Times Recorder =

Daily newspaper in Zanesville, Ohio

Zanesville Times Recorder
- Type: Daily newspaper
- Format: Broadsheet
- Owner: USA Today Co.
- Editor: Pam James
- Language: English
- Headquarters: 3871 Gorsky Drive G1; Zanesville, OH 43701; United States
- Circulation: 5,268 morning 7,026 Sunday
- ISSN: 1095-8266
- Website: zanesvilletimesrecorder.com

The Zanesville Times Recorder is a daily newspaper based in Zanesville, Ohio, that serves Muskingum County. The newspaper is part of the USA Today Network.

== History ==
On December 1, 1959, The Zanesville Times Recorder began printing 7-days a week, merging with The Zanesville Times Signal.

In October 1970, The Zanesville Publishing Company, owned by the Littick Family sold the paper to the Thomson Newspaper Publishing Company of Chicago.

On April 6, 1992 the last daily paper was printed in Zanesville. Printing operations was moved to Newark, Ohio.

In July 2000, Gannett completed purchase of 19 Thomson Newspapers, including the Zanesville Times Recorder.

In early 2014, Gannett announced that they would be moving printing operations from their downtown Newark location to Columbus, to be handled by The Dispatch Printing Company located at 5300 Crosswind Drive Columbus, Ohio.

On November 7, 2015, the historic downtown offices were vacated with office operations moved to the Northpointe Center at 3871 Gorskey Drive. Records from the Muskingum County Auditor show the downtown building was sold from Gannett to Tofino LLC in 2015, with the City of Zanesville subsequent purchasing the property in 2016.

On January 6, 2020, The Columbus Dispatch reported that the Columbus printing facility located at 5300 Crosswind Drive would close with printing of the Dispatch being relocated to Indianapolis. The article mentioned that smaller Gannett papers would also be transferred to the facility located at 8278 North Georgetown Road, Indianapolis, Indiana.

Starting April 2024, the newspaper will switch from carrier to postal delivery.
