= Congressional endorsements for the 2008 United States presidential election =

Endorsements by U.S. Congress members

This article lists the endorsements made by members of the 110th United States Congress for candidates for their party's nominations in the 2008 United States presidential election. All of the Democratic members of Congress are also superdelegates to their party's presidential nominating convention, except for those from Florida and Michigan. For further details of superdelegates and their voting intentions see List of superdelegates at the 2008 Democratic National Convention. This page lists congressional endorsements, which are distinct from superdelegates' intentions to vote.

== Candidates for the US 2008 presidential election who have congressional endorsements ==
Candidate	Party	Senate endorsements	House endorsements	Total
Barack Obama	Democratic	46	188	233
Hillary Clinton	Democratic	0	28	28
John McCain	Republican	16	29	45
Ron Paul	Republican	0	2	2

== List of senators ==
Senator	Party	State	Endorsement	Reference
Richard Shelby	Republican	Alabama		
Jeff Sessions	Republican	Alabama		
Ted Stevens	Republican	Alaska		
Lisa Murkowski	Republican	Alaska		
John McCain	Republican	Arizona	John McCain	(self)
Jon Kyl	Republican	Arizona	John McCain	
Blanche Lincoln	Democratic	Arkansas	Barack Obama	
Mark Pryor	Democratic	Arkansas	Barack Obama	
Dianne Feinstein	Democratic	California	Barack Obama	
Barbara Boxer	Democratic	California	Barack Obama	
Wayne Allard	Republican	Colorado		
Ken Salazar	Democratic	Colorado	Barack Obama	
Chris Dodd	Democratic	Connecticut	Barack Obama	
Joe Lieberman	Independent	Connecticut	John McCain	
Joe Biden	Democratic	Delaware	Barack Obama (Vice Presidential nominee)	
Tom Carper	Democratic	Delaware	Barack Obama	
Bill Nelson	Democratic	Florida	Barack Obama	
Mel Martinez	Republican	Florida	John McCain	
Saxby Chambliss	Republican	Georgia	John McCain	
Johnny Isakson	Republican	Georgia	John McCain	
Daniel Inouye	Democratic	Hawaii	Barack Obama	
Daniel Akaka	Democratic	Hawaii	Barack Obama	
Larry Craig	Republican	Idaho		
Mike Crapo	Republican	Idaho		
Dick Durbin	Democratic	Illinois	Barack Obama	
Barack Obama	Democratic	Illinois	Barack Obama	(self)
Richard Lugar	Republican	Indiana		
Evan Bayh	Democratic	Indiana	Barack Obama	
Chuck Grassley	Republican	Iowa		
Tom Harkin	Democratic	Iowa	Barack Obama	
Sam Brownback	Republican	Kansas	John McCain	
Pat Roberts	Republican	Kansas	John McCain	
Mitch McConnell	Republican	Kentucky	John McCain	
Jim Bunning	Republican	Kentucky		
Mary Landrieu	Democratic	Louisiana	Barack Obama	
David Vitter	Republican	Louisiana		
Olympia Snowe	Republican	Maine	John McCain	
Susan Collins	Republican	Maine	John McCain	
Barbara Mikulski	Democratic	Maryland	Barack Obama	
Ben Cardin	Democratic	Maryland	Barack Obama	
Ted Kennedy	Democratic	Massachusetts	Barack Obama	
John Kerry	Democratic	Massachusetts	Barack Obama	
Carl Levin	Democratic	Michigan	Barack Obama	
Debbie Stabenow	Democratic	Michigan	Barack Obama	
Norm Coleman	Republican	Minnesota	John McCain	
Amy Klobuchar	Democratic	Minnesota	Barack Obama	
Thad Cochran	Republican	Mississippi		
Roger Wicker	Republican	Mississippi		
Kit Bond	Republican	Missouri		
Claire McCaskill	Democratic	Missouri	Barack Obama	
Max Baucus	Democratic	Montana	Barack Obama	
Jon Tester	Democratic	Montana	Barack Obama	
Chuck Hagel	Republican	Nebraska		
Ben Nelson	Democratic	Nebraska	Barack Obama	
Harry Reid	Democratic	Nevada	Barack Obama	
John Ensign	Republican	Nevada		
Judd Gregg	Republican	New Hampshire		
John E. Sununu	Republican	New Hampshire		
Frank Lautenberg	Democratic	New Jersey	Barack Obama	
Bob Menendez	Democratic	New Jersey	Barack Obama	
Pete Domenici	Republican	New Mexico	John McCain	
Jeff Bingaman	Democratic	New Mexico	Barack Obama	
Chuck Schumer	Democratic	New York	Barack Obama	
Hillary Clinton	Democratic	New York	Barack Obama	
Elizabeth Dole	Republican	North Carolina	John McCain	
Richard Burr	Republican	North Carolina	John McCain	
Kent Conrad	Democratic	North Dakota	Barack Obama	
Byron Dorgan	Democratic	North Dakota	Barack Obama	
George Voinovich	Republican	Ohio		
Sherrod Brown	Democratic	Ohio	Barack Obama	
Jim Inhofe	Republican	Oklahoma		
Tom Coburn	Republican	Oklahoma	John McCain	
Ron Wyden	Democratic	Oregon	Barack Obama	
Gordon H. Smith	Republican	Oregon	John McCain	
Arlen Specter	Republican	Pennsylvania		
Bob Casey Jr.	Democratic	Pennsylvania	Barack Obama	
Jack Reed	Democratic	Rhode Island	Barack Obama	
Sheldon Whitehouse	Democratic	Rhode Island	Barack Obama	
Lindsey Graham	Republican	South Carolina	John McCain	
Jim DeMint	Republican	South Carolina	Mitt Romney	
Tim P. Johnson	Democratic	South Dakota	Barack Obama	
John Thune	Republican	South Dakota	John McCain	
Lamar Alexander	Republican	Tennessee		
Bob Corker	Republican	Tennessee		
Kay Bailey Hutchison	Republican	Texas		
John Cornyn	Republican	Texas	John McCain	
Orrin Hatch	Republican	Utah		
Bob Bennett	Republican	Utah		
Patrick Leahy	Democratic	Vermont	Barack Obama	
Bernie Sanders	Independent	Vermont		
John Warner	Republican	Virginia	John McCain	
Jim Webb	Democratic	Virginia	Barack Obama	
Patty Murray	Democratic	Washington	Barack Obama	
Maria Cantwell	Democratic	Washington	Barack Obama	
Robert Byrd	Democratic	West Virginia	Barack Obama	
Jay Rockefeller	Democratic	West Virginia	Barack Obama	
Herb Kohl	Democratic	Wisconsin	Barack Obama	
Russ Feingold	Democratic	Wisconsin	Barack Obama	
John Barrasso	Republican	Wyoming		
Mike Enzi	Republican	Wyoming		

== List of representatives ==
District	Member	Party	State	Endorsement	Reference
1	Jo Bonner	Republican	Alabama	Mitt Romney	
2	Terry Everett	Republican	Alabama		
3	Mike D. Rogers	Republican	Alabama		
4	Robert Aderholt	Republican	Alabama		
5	Bud Cramer	Democratic	Alabama		
6	Spencer Bachus	Republican	Alabama	John McCain	
7	Artur Davis	Democratic	Alabama	Barack Obama	
At large	Don Young	Republican	Alaska		
1	Rick Renzi	Republican	Arizona	John McCain	
2	Trent Franks	Republican	Arizona		
3	John Shadegg	Republican	Arizona	John McCain	
4	Ed Pastor	Democratic	Arizona	Hillary Clinton	
5	Harry Mitchell	Democratic	Arizona	Barack Obama	
6	Jeff Flake	Republican	Arizona	John McCain	
7	Raúl Grijalva	Democratic	Arizona	Barack Obama	
8	Gabby Giffords	Democratic	Arizona	Barack Obama	
1	Marion Berry	Democratic	Arkansas	Barack Obama	
2	Vic Snyder	Democratic	Arkansas	Barack Obama	
3	John Boozman	Republican	Arkansas	Mike Huckabee	
4	Mike Ross	Democratic	Arkansas	Barack Obama	
1	Mike Thompson	Democratic	California	Barack Obama	
2	Wally Herger	Republican	California		
3	Dan Lungren	Republican	California	John McCain	
4	John Doolittle	Republican	California		
5	Doris Matsui	Democratic	California	Hillary Clinton	
6	Lynn Woolsey	Democratic	California	Hillary Clinton	
7	George Miller	Democratic	California	Barack Obama	
8	Nancy Pelosi	Democratic	California		
9	Barbara Lee	Democratic	California	Barack Obama	
10	Ellen Tauscher	Democratic	California	Hillary Clinton	
11	Jerry McNerney	Democratic	California	Barack Obama	
12	Jackie Speier	Democratic	California	Hillary Clinton	
13	Pete Stark	Democratic	California	Barack Obama	
14	Anna Eshoo	Democratic	California	Barack Obama	
15	Mike Honda	Democratic	California		
16	Zoe Lofgren	Democratic	California	Barack Obama	
17	Sam Farr	Democratic	California	Barack Obama	
18	Dennis Cardoza	Democratic	California	Barack Obama	
19	George Radanovich	Republican	California		
20	Jim Costa	Democratic	California	Barack Obama	
21	Devin Nunes	Republican	California		
22	Kevin McCarthy	Republican	California		
23	Lois Capps	Democratic	California	Barack Obama	
24	Elton Gallegly	Republican	California		
25	Howard McKeon	Republican	California		
26	David Dreier	Republican	California		
27	Brad Sherman	Democratic	California	Hillary Clinton	
28	Howard Berman	Democratic	California	Barack Obama	
29	Adam Schiff	Democratic	California	Barack Obama	
30	Henry Waxman	Democratic	California	Barack Obama	
31	Xavier Becerra	Democratic	California	Barack Obama	
32	Hilda Solis	Democratic	California	Hillary Clinton	
33	Diane Watson	Democratic	California	Hillary Clinton	
34	Lucille Roybal-Allard	Democratic	California	Hillary Clinton	
35	Maxine Waters	Democratic	California	Barack Obama	
36	Jane Harman	Democratic	California	Hillary Clinton	
37	Laura Richardson	Democratic	California	Hillary Clinton	
38	Grace Napolitano	Democratic	California	Barack Obama	
39	Linda Sánchez	Democratic	California	Barack Obama	
40	Ed Royce	Republican	California		
41	Jerry Lewis	Republican	California		
42	Gary Miller	Republican	California		
43	Joe Baca	Democratic	California	Barack Obama	
44	Ken Calvert	Republican	California		
45	Mary Bono	Republican	California		
46	Dana Rohrabacher	Republican	California		
47	Loretta Sanchez	Democratic	California	Hillary Clinton	
48	John Campbell	Republican	California		
49	Darrell Issa	Republican	California	John McCain	
50	Brian Bilbray	Republican	California		
51	Bob Filner	Democratic	California	Barack Obama	
52	Duncan Hunter	Republican	California		
53	Susan Davis	Democratic	California	Barack Obama	
1	Diana DeGette	Democratic	Colorado	Barack Obama	
2	Mark Udall	Democratic	Colorado	Barack Obama	
3	John Salazar	Democratic	Colorado	Barack Obama	
4	Marilyn Musgrave	Republican	Colorado		
5	Doug Lamborn	Republican	Colorado		
6	Tom Tancredo	Republican	Colorado		
7	Ed Perlmutter	Democratic	Colorado	Barack Obama	
1	John Larson	Democratic	Connecticut	Barack Obama	
2	Joe Courtney	Democratic	Connecticut	Barack Obama	
3	Rosa DeLauro	Democratic	Connecticut	Barack Obama	
4	Christopher Shays	Republican	Connecticut	John McCain	
5	Chris Murphy	Democratic	Connecticut	Barack Obama	
At large	Mike Castle	Republican	Delaware	John McCain	
1	Jeff Miller	Republican	Florida	John McCain	
2	Allen Boyd	Democratic	Florida		
3	Corrine Brown	Democratic	Florida	Barack Obama	
4	Ander Crenshaw	Republican	Florida		
5	Ginny Brown-Waite	Republican	Florida		
6	Cliff Stearns	Republican	Florida		
7	John Mica	Republican	Florida		
8	Ric Keller	Republican	Florida	John McCain	
9	Gus Bilirakis	Republican	Florida	John McCain	
10	Bill Young	Republican	Florida		
11	Kathy Castor	Democratic	Florida	Barack Obama	
12	Adam Putnam	Republican	Florida		
13	Vernon Buchanan	Republican	Florida		
14	Connie Mack IV	Republican	Florida		
15	Dave Weldon	Republican	Florida		
16	Tim Mahoney	Democratic	Florida		
17	Kendrick Meek	Democratic	Florida	Barack Obama	
18	Ileana Ros-Lehtinen	Republican	Florida	John McCain	
19	Robert Wexler	Democratic	Florida	Barack Obama	
20	Debbie Wasserman Schultz	Democratic	Florida	Barack Obama	
21	Lincoln Díaz-Balart	Republican	Florida	John McCain	
22	Ron Klein	Democratic	Florida	Barack Obama	
23	Alcee Hastings	Democratic	Florida	Barack Obama	
24	Tom Feeney	Republican	Florida		
25	Mario Díaz-Balart	Republican	Florida	John McCain	
1	Jack Kingston	Republican	Georgia		
2	Sanford Bishop	Democratic	Georgia	Barack Obama	
3	Lynn Westmoreland	Republican	Georgia		
4	Hank Johnson	Democratic	Georgia	Barack Obama	
5	John Lewis	Democratic	Georgia	Barack Obama	
6	Tom Price	Republican	Georgia		
7	John Linder	Republican	Georgia		
8	Jim Marshall	Democratic	Georgia		
9	Nathan Deal	Republican	Georgia		
10	Paul Broun	Republican	Georgia		
11	Phil Gingrey	Republican	Georgia		
12	John Barrow	Democratic	Georgia	Barack Obama	
13	David Scott	Democratic	Georgia	Barack Obama	
1	Neil Abercrombie	Democratic	Hawaii	Barack Obama	
2	Mazie Hirono	Democratic	Hawaii	Barack Obama	
1	Bill Sali	Republican	Idaho		
2	Mike Simpson	Republican	Idaho		
1	Bobby Rush	Democratic	Illinois	Barack Obama	
2	Jesse Jackson Jr.	Democratic	Illinois	Barack Obama	
3	Dan Lipinski	Democratic	Illinois	Barack Obama	
4	Luis Gutierrez	Democratic	Illinois	Barack Obama	
5	Rahm Emanuel	Democratic	Illinois	Barack Obama	
6	Peter Roskam	Republican	Illinois	John McCain	
7	Danny Davis	Democratic	Illinois	Barack Obama	
8	Melissa Bean	Democratic	Illinois	Barack Obama	
9	Jan Schakowsky	Democratic	Illinois	Barack Obama	
10	Mark Kirk	Republican	Illinois	John McCain	
11	Jerry Weller	Republican	Illinois		
12	Jerry Costello	Democratic	Illinois	Barack Obama	
13	Judy Biggert	Republican	Illinois		
14	Bill Foster	Democratic	Illinois	Barack Obama	
15	Tim V. Johnson	Republican	Illinois		
16	Donald Manzullo	Republican	Illinois		
17	Phil Hare	Democratic	Illinois	Barack Obama	
18	Ray LaHood	Republican	Illinois	John McCain	
19	John Shimkus	Republican	Illinois	John McCain	
1	Pete Visclosky	Democratic	Indiana	Barack Obama	
2	Joe Donnelly	Democratic	Indiana	Barack Obama	
3	Mark Souder	Republican	Indiana		
4	Steve Buyer	Republican	Indiana		
5	Dan Burton	Republican	Indiana		
6	Mike Pence	Republican	Indiana		
7	André Carson	Democratic	Indiana	Barack Obama	
8	Brad Ellsworth	Democratic	Indiana	Barack Obama	
9	Baron Hill	Democratic	Indiana	Barack Obama	
1	Bruce Braley	Democratic	Iowa	Barack Obama	
2	Dave Loebsack	Democratic	Iowa	Barack Obama	
3	Leonard Boswell	Democratic	Iowa	Hillary Clinton	
4	Tom Latham	Republican	Iowa		
5	Steve King	Republican	Iowa		
1	Jerry Moran	Republican	Kansas		
2	Nancy Boyda	Democratic	Kansas		
3	Dennis Moore	Democratic	Kansas	Barack Obama	
4	Todd Tiahrt	Republican	Kansas		
1	Ed Whitfield	Republican	Kentucky		
2	Ron Lewis	Republican	Kentucky		
3	John Yarmuth	Democratic	Kentucky	Barack Obama	
4	Geoff Davis	Republican	Kentucky		
5	Hal Rogers	Republican	Kentucky		
6	Ben Chandler	Democratic	Kentucky	Barack Obama	
1	Steve Scalise	Republican	Louisiana		
2	William Jefferson	Democratic	Louisiana	Barack Obama	
3	Charlie Melancon	Democratic	Louisiana		
4	Jim McCrery	Republican	Louisiana		
5	Rodney Alexander	Republican	Louisiana		
6	Don Cazayoux	Democratic	Louisiana		
7	Charles Boustany	Republican	Louisiana		
1	Tom Allen	Democratic	Maine	Barack Obama	
2	Mike Michaud	Democratic	Maine	Barack Obama	
1	Wayne Gilchrest	Republican	Maryland		
2	Dutch Ruppersberger	Democratic	Maryland	Barack Obama	
3	John Sarbanes	Democratic	Maryland	Barack Obama	
4	Donna Edwards	Democratic	Maryland	Barack Obama	
5	Steny Hoyer	Democratic	Maryland	Barack Obama	
6	Roscoe Bartlett	Republican	Maryland		
7	Elijah Cummings	Democratic	Maryland	Barack Obama	
8	Chris Van Hollen	Democratic	Maryland	Barack Obama	
1	John Olver	Democratic	Massachusetts	Barack Obama	
2	Richard Neal	Democratic	Massachusetts	Barack Obama	
3	Jim McGovern	Democratic	Massachusetts	Hillary Clinton	
4	Barney Frank	Democratic	Massachusetts	Hillary Clinton	
5	Niki Tsongas	Democratic	Massachusetts	Barack Obama	
6	John Tierney	Democratic	Massachusetts		
7	Edward Markey	Democratic	Massachusetts		
8	Michael Capuano	Democratic	Massachusetts	Barack Obama	
9	Stephen Lynch	Democratic	Massachusetts	Hillary Clinton	
10	William Delahunt	Democratic	Massachusetts	Barack Obama	
1	Bart Stupak	Democratic	Michigan	Barack Obama	
2	Peter Hoekstra	Republican	Michigan		
3	Vern Ehlers	Republican	Michigan		
4	David Lee Camp	Republican	Michigan		
5	Dale Kildee	Democratic	Michigan	Barack Obama	
6	Fred Upton	Republican	Michigan	John McCain	
7	Tim Walberg	Republican	Michigan		
8	Mike J. Rogers	Republican	Michigan		
9	Joe Knollenberg	Republican	Michigan		
10	Candice Miller	Republican	Michigan		
11	Thad McCotter	Republican	Michigan		
12	Sander Levin	Democratic	Michigan	Barack Obama	
13	Carolyn Cheeks Kilpatrick	Democratic	Michigan	Barack Obama	
14	John Conyers	Democratic	Michigan	Barack Obama	
15	John Dingell	Democratic	Michigan	Barack Obama	
1	Tim Walz	Democratic	Minnesota	Barack Obama	
2	John Kline	Republican	Minnesota		
3	Jim Ramstad	Republican	Minnesota		
4	Betty McCollum	Democratic	Minnesota	Barack Obama	
5	Keith Ellison	Democratic	Minnesota	Barack Obama	
6	Michele Bachmann	Republican	Minnesota		
7	Collin Peterson	Democratic	Minnesota	Barack Obama	
8	Jim Oberstar	Democratic	Minnesota	Barack Obama	
1	Travis Childers	Democratic	Mississippi		
2	Bennie Thompson	Democratic	Mississippi	Barack Obama	
3	Chip Pickering	Republican	Mississippi	John McCain	
4	Gene Taylor	Democratic	Mississippi		
1	Lacy Clay	Democratic	Missouri	Barack Obama	
2	Todd Akin	Republican	Missouri		
3	Russ Carnahan	Democratic	Missouri	Barack Obama	
4	Ike Skelton	Democratic	Missouri	Hillary Clinton	
5	Emanuel Cleaver	Democratic	Missouri	Hillary Clinton	
6	Sam Graves	Republican	Missouri		
7	Roy Blunt	Republican	Missouri		
8	Jo Ann Emerson	Republican	Missouri		
9	Kenny Hulshof	Republican	Missouri		
At large	Denny Rehberg	Republican	Montana		
1	Jeff Fortenberry	Republican	Nebraska		
2	Lee Terry	Republican	Nebraska		
3	Adrian Smith	Republican	Nebraska		
1	Shelley Berkley	Democratic	Nevada	Barack Obama	
2	Dean Heller	Republican	Nevada		
3	Jon Porter	Republican	Nevada		
1	Carol Shea-Porter	Democratic	New Hampshire	Barack Obama	
2	Paul Hodes	Democratic	New Hampshire	Barack Obama	
1	Rob Andrews	Democratic	New Jersey	Barack Obama	
2	Frank LoBiondo	Republican	New Jersey	John McCain	
3	Jim Saxton	Republican	New Jersey		
4	Chris Smith	Republican	New Jersey		
5	Scott Garrett	Republican	New Jersey		
6	Frank Pallone	Democratic	New Jersey	Hillary Clinton	
7	Mike Ferguson	Republican	New Jersey		
8	Bill Pascrell Jr.	Democratic	New Jersey	Barack Obama	
9	Steve Rothman	Democratic	New Jersey	Barack Obama	
10	Donald M. Payne	Democratic	New Jersey	Barack Obama	
11	Rodney Frelinghuysen	Republican	New Jersey		
12	Rush Holt Jr.	Democratic	New Jersey	Barack Obama	
13	Albio Sires	Democratic	New Jersey	Hillary Clinton	
1	Heather Wilson	Republican	New Mexico		
2	Steve Pearce	Republican	New Mexico		
3	Tom Udall	Democratic	New Mexico	Barack Obama	
1	Tim Bishop	Democratic	New York	Barack Obama	
2	Steve Israel	Democratic	New York	Barack Obama	
3	Peter King	Republican	New York	John McCain	
4	Carolyn McCarthy	Democratic	New York	Barack Obama	
5	Gary Ackerman	Democratic	New York	Barack Obama	
6	Gregory Meeks	Democratic	New York	Barack Obama	
7	Joseph Crowley	Democratic	New York	Barack Obama	
8	Jerrold Nadler	Democratic	New York	Barack Obama	
9	Anthony Weiner	Democratic	New York	Barack Obama	
10	Edolphus Towns	Democratic	New York	Barack Obama	
11	Yvette Clarke	Democratic	New York	Barack Obama	
12	Nydia Velázquez	Democratic	New York	Barack Obama	
13	Vito Fossella	Republican	New York		
14	Carolyn Maloney	Democratic	New York	Barack Obama	
15	Charles Rangel	Democratic	New York	Barack Obama	
16	José Serrano	Democratic	New York	Barack Obama	
17	Eliot Engel	Democratic	New York	Barack Obama	
18	Nita Lowey	Democratic	New York	Barack Obama	
19	John Hall	Democratic	New York	Barack Obama	
20	Kirsten Gillibrand	Democratic	New York	Barack Obama	
21	Michael McNulty	Democratic	New York	Barack Obama	
22	Maurice Hinchey	Democratic	New York	Barack Obama	
23	John M. McHugh	Republican	New York		
24	Michael Arcuri	Democratic	New York	Barack Obama	
25	James T. Walsh	Republican	New York		
26	Tom Reynolds	Republican	New York		
27	Brian Higgins	Democratic	New York	Barack Obama	
28	Louise Slaughter	Democratic	New York	Barack Obama	
29	Randy Kuhl	Republican	New York	John McCain	
1	G. K. Butterfield	Democratic	North Carolina	Barack Obama	
2	Bob Etheridge	Democratic	North Carolina	Barack Obama	
3	Walter B. Jones Jr.	Republican	North Carolina	Ron Paul	
4	David Price	Democratic	North Carolina	Barack Obama	
5	Virginia Foxx	Republican	North Carolina		
6	Howard Coble	Republican	North Carolina		
7	Mike McIntyre	Democratic	North Carolina	Barack Obama	
8	Robin Hayes	Republican	North Carolina		
9	Sue Myrick	Republican	North Carolina		
10	Patrick McHenry	Republican	North Carolina		
11	Heath Shuler	Democratic	North Carolina	Hillary Clinton	
12	Melvin Watt	Democratic	North Carolina	Barack Obama	
13	Brad Miller	Democratic	North Carolina	Barack Obama	
At large	Earl Pomeroy	Democratic	North Dakota	Barack Obama	
1	Steve Chabot	Republican	Ohio		
2	Jean Schmidt	Republican	Ohio		
3	Mike Turner	Republican	Ohio		
4	Jim Jordan	Republican	Ohio		
5	Bob Latta	Republican	Ohio		
6	Charlie Wilson	Democratic	Ohio	Barack Obama	
7	Dave Hobson	Republican	Ohio		
8	John Boehner	Republican	Ohio		
9	Marcy Kaptur	Democratic	Ohio		
10	Dennis Kucinich	Democratic	Ohio	Barack Obama	
11	Stephanie Tubbs Jones	Democratic	Ohio	Barack Obama	
12	Pat Tiberi	Republican	Ohio		
13	Betty Sutton	Democratic	Ohio	Barack Obama	
14	Steve LaTourette	Republican	Ohio	John McCain	
15	Deborah Pryce	Republican	Ohio	John McCain	
16	Ralph Regula	Republican	Ohio		
17	Tim Ryan	Democratic	Ohio	Barack Obama	
18	Zack Space	Democratic	Ohio	Barack Obama	
1	John Sullivan	Republican	Oklahoma		
2	Dan Boren	Democratic	Oklahoma		
3	Frank Lucas	Republican	Oklahoma		
4	Tom Cole	Republican	Oklahoma		
5	Mary Fallin	Republican	Oklahoma		
1	David Wu	Democratic	Oregon	Barack Obama	
2	Greg Walden	Republican	Oregon		
3	Earl Blumenauer	Democratic	Oregon	Barack Obama	
4	Peter DeFazio	Democratic	Oregon	Barack Obama	
5	Darlene Hooley	Democratic	Oregon	Barack Obama	
1	Bob Brady	Democratic	Pennsylvania	Barack Obama	
2	Chaka Fattah	Democratic	Pennsylvania	Barack Obama	
3	Phil English	Republican	Pennsylvania		
4	Jason Altmire	Democratic	Pennsylvania	Barack Obama	
5	John Peterson	Republican	Pennsylvania		
6	Jim Gerlach	Republican	Pennsylvania	John McCain	
7	Joe Sestak	Democratic	Pennsylvania	Barack Obama	
8	Patrick Murphy	Democratic	Pennsylvania	Barack Obama	
9	Bill Shuster	Republican	Pennsylvania		
10	Chris Carney	Democratic	Pennsylvania	Hillary Clinton	
11	Paul Kanjorski	Democratic	Pennsylvania	Hillary Clinton	
12	John Murtha	Democratic	Pennsylvania	Hillary Clinton	
13	Allyson Schwartz	Democratic	Pennsylvania	Barack Obama	
14	Mike Doyle	Democratic	Pennsylvania	Barack Obama	
15	Charlie Dent	Republican	Pennsylvania		
16	Joe Pitts	Republican	Pennsylvania		
17	Tim Holden	Democratic	Pennsylvania		
18	Tim Murphy	Republican	Pennsylvania		
19	Todd Russell Platts	Republican	Pennsylvania	John McCain	
1	Patrick Kennedy	Democratic	Rhode Island	Barack Obama	
2	James Langevin	Democratic	Rhode Island	Barack Obama	
1	Henry Brown	Republican	South Carolina		
2	Joseph Wilson	Republican	South Carolina	John McCain	
3	Gresham Barrett	Republican	South Carolina		
4	Bob Inglis	Republican	South Carolina		
5	John Spratt	Democratic	South Carolina	Barack Obama	
6	Jim Clyburn	Democratic	South Carolina	Barack Obama	
At large	Stephanie Herseth Sandlin	Democratic	South Dakota	Barack Obama	
1	David Davis	Republican	Tennessee		
2	Jimmy Duncan	Republican	Tennessee		
3	Zach Wamp	Republican	Tennessee		
4	Lincoln Davis	Democratic	Tennessee		
5	Jim Cooper	Democratic	Tennessee	Barack Obama	
6	Bart Gordon	Democratic	Tennessee		
7	Marsha Blackburn	Republican	Tennessee		
8	John Tanner	Democratic	Tennessee	Hillary Clinton	
9	Steve Cohen	Democratic	Tennessee	Barack Obama	
1	Louie Gohmert	Republican	Texas		
2	Ted Poe	Republican	Texas		
3	Sam Johnson	Republican	Texas		
4	Ralph Hall	Republican	Texas		
5	Jeb Hensarling	Republican	Texas		
6	Joe Barton	Republican	Texas		
7	John Culberson	Republican	Texas		
8	Kevin Brady	Republican	Texas		
9	Al Green	Democratic	Texas	Barack Obama	
10	Michael McCaul	Republican	Texas		
11	Mike Conaway	Republican	Texas		
12	Kay Granger	Republican	Texas		
13	Mac Thornberry	Republican	Texas		
14	Ron Paul	Republican	Texas	Ron Paul	(self)
15	Ruben Hinojosa	Democratic	Texas	Barack Obama	
16	Silvestre Reyes	Democratic	Texas	Barack Obama	
17	Chet Edwards	Democratic	Texas	Barack Obama	
18	Sheila Jackson-Lee	Democratic	Texas	Hillary Clinton	
19	Randy Neugebauer	Republican	Texas		
20	Charlie Gonzalez	Democratic	Texas	Barack Obama	
21	Lamar Smith	Republican	Texas		
22	Nick Lampson	Democratic	Texas		
23	Ciro Rodriguez	Democratic	Texas	Hillary Clinton	
24	Kenny Marchant	Republican	Texas		
25	Lloyd Doggett	Democratic	Texas	Barack Obama	
26	Michael C. Burgess	Republican	Texas		
27	Solomon Ortiz	Democratic	Texas	Barack Obama	
28	Henry Cuellar	Democratic	Texas	Barack Obama	
29	Gene Green	Democratic	Texas	Hillary Clinton	
30	Eddie Bernice Johnson	Democratic	Texas	Barack Obama	
31	John Carter	Republican	Texas		
32	Pete Sessions	Republican	Texas		
1	Rob Bishop	Republican	Utah		
2	Jim Matheson	Democratic	Utah	Barack Obama	
3	Chris Cannon	Republican	Utah		
At large	Peter Welch	Democratic	Vermont	Barack Obama	
1	Rob Wittman	Republican	Virginia		
2	Thelma Drake	Republican	Virginia		
3	Bobby Scott	Democratic	Virginia	Barack Obama	
4	Randy Forbes	Republican	Virginia		
5	Virgil Goode	Republican	Virginia		
6	Bob Goodlatte	Republican	Virginia		
7	Eric Cantor	Republican	Virginia		
8	Jim Moran	Democratic	Virginia	Barack Obama	
9	Rick Boucher	Democratic	Virginia	Barack Obama	
10	Frank Wolf	Republican	Virginia		
11	Tom Davis	Republican	Virginia	John McCain	
1	Jay Inslee	Democratic	Washington	Barack Obama	
2	Rick Larsen	Democratic	Washington	Barack Obama	
3	Brian Baird	Democratic	Washington	Barack Obama	
4	Richard "Doc" Hastings	Republican	Washington		
5	Cathy McMorris	Republican	Washington		
6	Norm Dicks	Democratic	Washington	Barack Obama	
7	Jim McDermott	Democratic	Washington	Barack Obama	
8	Dave Reichert	Republican	Washington		
9	Adam Smith	Democratic	Washington	Barack Obama	
1	Alan Mollohan	Democratic	West Virginia	Barack Obama	
2	Shelley Moore Capito	Republican	West Virginia		
3	Nick Rahall	Democratic	West Virginia	Barack Obama	
1	Paul Ryan	Republican	Wisconsin		
2	Tammy Baldwin	Democratic	Wisconsin	Barack Obama	
3	Ron Kind	Democratic	Wisconsin	Barack Obama	
4	Gwen Moore	Democratic	Wisconsin	Barack Obama	
5	Jim Sensenbrenner	Republican	Wisconsin		
6	Tom Petri	Republican	Wisconsin		
7	Dave Obey	Democratic	Wisconsin	Barack Obama	
8	Steve Kagen	Democratic	Wisconsin	Barack Obama	
At large	Barbara Cubin	Republican	Wyoming		
At large	Eni Faleomavaega	Democratic	American Samoa	Barack Obama	
At large	Eleanor Holmes Norton	Democratic	District of Columbia	Barack Obama	
At large	Madeleine Bordallo	Democratic	Guam	Barack Obama	
At large	Luis Fortuño	Republican	Puerto Rico		
At large	Donna Christian-Christensen	Democratic	Virgin Islands	Hillary Clinton	

== Past candidates ==
=== Democratic ===
Joe Biden

- Sen. Thomas Carper (DE)

Chris Dodd

- Rep. Xavier Becerra (CA) (Obama)
- Rep. Rosa DeLauro (CT) (Obama)
- Rep. Chris Murphy (CT) (Obama)
- Rep. Tim Ryan (OH) (Clinton)

John Edwards

- Rep. Bruce Braley (IA) (Obama)
- Rep. G. K. Butterfield (NC) (Obama)
- Rep. Bob Etheridge (NC)
- Rep. Stephanie Herseth-Sandlin (SD) (Obama)
- Rep. Charlie Gonzalez (TX) (Obama)
- Rep. Eddie Bernice Johnson (TX) (Obama)
- Rep. Mike McIntyre (NC)
- Rep. Mike Michaud (ME)
- Rep. Brad Miller (NC) (Obama)
- Rep. Jim Oberstar (MN) (Obama)
- Rep. Dave Obey (WI) (Obama)
- Rep. David Price (NC) (Obama)
- Rep. Heath Shuler (NC) (Clinton)
- Rep. Bart Stupak (MI)
- Rep. Mel Watt (NC) (Obama)

Bill Richardson

- Sen. Jeff Bingaman (NM) (Obama)
- Rep. Mike Doyle (PA)
- Rep. Gene Green (TX) (Clinton)
- Rep. Solomon Ortiz (TX) (Clinton)
- Rep. Ed Pastor (AZ) (Clinton)
- Rep. Silvestre Reyes (TX) (Clinton)
- Rep. Tom Udall (NM)

=== Republican ===
Rudy Giuliani

- Sen. David Vitter (LA)
- Sen. Norm Coleman (MN) (McCain)
- Sen. Kit Bond (MO)
- Rep. Judy Biggert (IL)
- Rep. Mary Bono (CA)
- Rep. Charles Boustany (LA)
- Rep. Charlie Dent (PA)
- Rep. David Dreier (CA)
- Rep. Jo Ann Emerson (MO)
- Rep. Phil English (PA)
- Rep. Vito Fossella (NY)
- Rep. Jim Gerlach (PA)
- Rep. Peter King (NY)
- Rep. Jerry Lewis (IL)
- Rep. Frank LoBiondo (NJ)
- Rep. Candice Miller (MI)
- Rep. Devin Nunes (CA)
- Rep. Jon Porter (NV)
- Rep. George Radanovich (CA)
- Rep. Dave Reichert (WA)
- Rep. Ed Royce (CA)
- Rep. Pete Sessions (TX)
- Rep. James T. Walsh (NY)
- Rep. Jerry Weller (IL)
- Del. Luis Fortuño (PR)

Mike Huckabee

- Rep. John Boozman (AR)
- Rep. Duncan Hunter (CA)
- Rep. Bob Inglis (SC)
- Rep. John Linder (GA)
- Rep. Don Young (AK)

Mitt Romney

- Sen. Wayne Allard (CO)
- Sen. Bob Bennett (UT)
- Sen. Thad Cochran (MS)
- Sen. Jim DeMint (SC)
- Sen. Judd Gregg (NH)
- Sen. Orrin Hatch (UT)
- Sen. Lisa Murkowski (AK)
- Rep. Robert Aderholt (AL)
- Rep. Rodney Alexander (LA)
- Rep. Brian Bilbray (CA)
- Rep. Marsha Blackburn (TN)
- Rep. Ginny Brown-Waite (FL)
- Rep. Dave Camp (MI)
- Rep. John Campbell (CA)
- Rep. Chriss Cannon (UT)
- Rep. John Carter (TX)
- Rep. Howard Coble (NC)
- Rep. Mike Conaway (TX)
- Rep. Ander Crenshaw (FL)
- Rep. Vernon Ehlers (MI)
- Rep. Tom Feeney (FL)
- Rep. Mike Ferguson (NJ)
- Rep. Virginia Foxx (NC)
- Rep. Phil Gingrey (GA)
- Rep. Kay Granger (TX)
- Rep. Wally Herger (CA)
- Rep. Peter Hoekstra (MI)
- Rep. Jack Kingston (GA)
- Rep. Joe Knollenberg (MI)
- Rep. Ron Lewis (KY)
- Rep. Connie Mack (FL)
- Rep. Jim McCrery (LA)
- Rep. Buck McKeon (CA)
- Rep. Thomas Petri (WI)
- Rep. Tom Price (GA)
- Rep. Ralph Regula (OH)
- Rep. Hal Rogers (KY)
- Rep. Mike D. Rogers (AL)
- Rep. Dana Rohrabacher (CA)
- Rep. Bill Shuster (PA)
- Rep. Mike Simpson (ID)
- Rep. Lamar Smith (TX)
- Rep. Tom Tancredo (CO)
- Rep. Lynn Westmoreland (GA)
- Rep. Ed Whitfield (KY)

Fred Thompson

- Sen. Lamar Alexander (TN)
- Sen. Bob Corker (TN)
- Sen. Jim Inhofe (OK)
- Sen. Roger Wicker (MS)
- Rep. Gresham Barrett (SC)
- Rep. Dan Burton (IN)
- Rep. Steve Buyer (IN)
- Rep. David Davis (TN)
- Rep. Jimmy Duncan (TN)
- Rep. Louie Gohmert (TX)
- Rep. Steve King (IA)
- Rep. Donald Manzullo (IL)
- Rep. Thad McCotter (MI)
- Rep. Susan Myrick (NC)
- Rep. Jeff Miller (FL)
- Rep. Adam Putnam (FL)
- Rep. John Sullivan (OK)
- Rep. Lee Terry (NE)
- Rep. Zach Wamp (TN)
- Rep. Lynn Westmoreland (GA)
