= Whitby woman =

UK electoral stereotype

Whitby woman is a stereotypical voter identified in the United Kingdom, similar to Stevenage woman or Worcester woman.

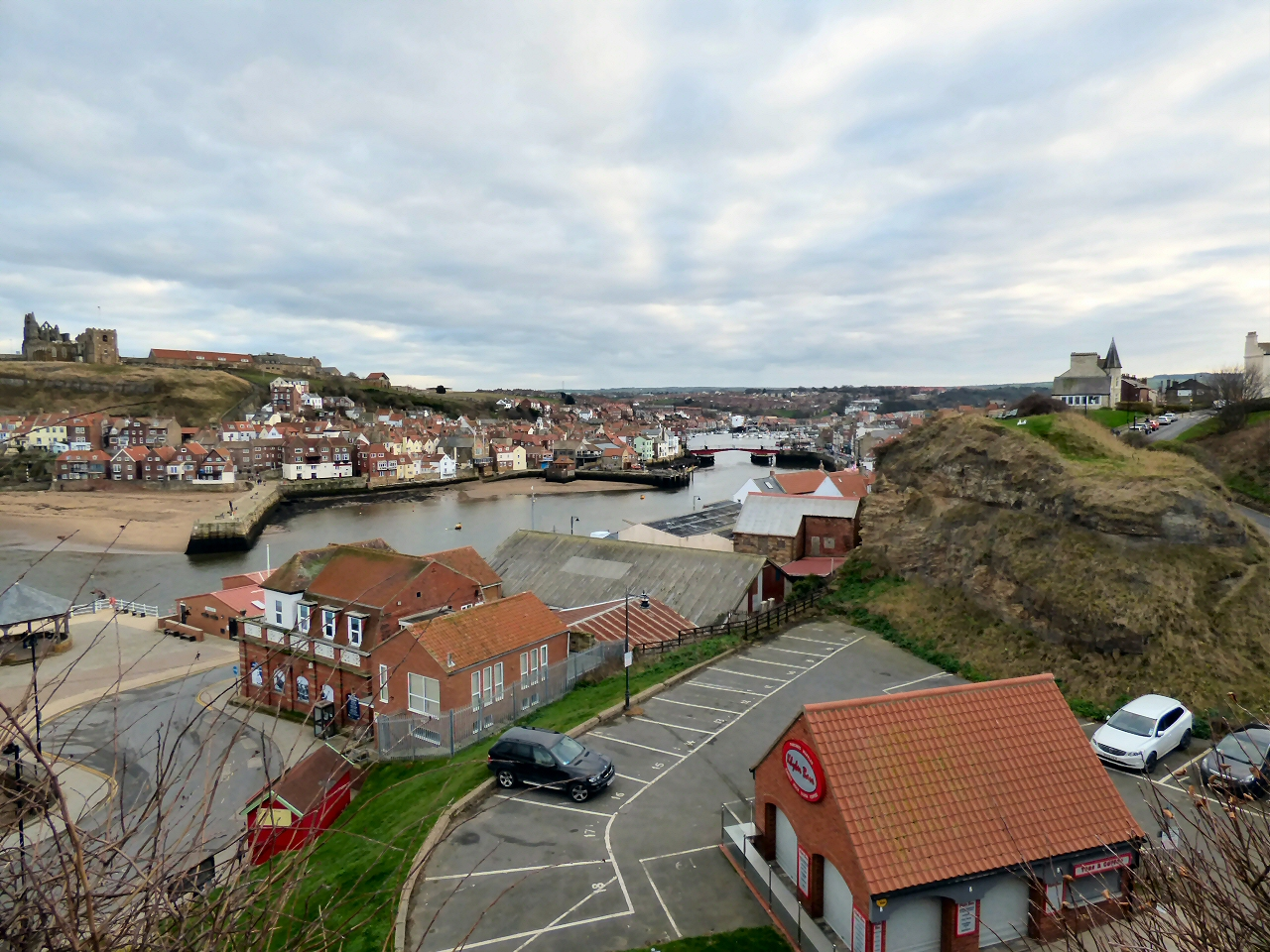
Whitby, North Yorkshire

The term "Whitby woman" was coined by the polling think-tank More in Common. Like Stevenage woman and Waitrose woman, the Whitby woman was considered a important swing voter for the Labour Party in the 2024 United Kingdom general election. It was a key female demographic considered important for Keir Starmer to win over for a parliamentary majority. The woman lives in the medieval fishing town of Whitby on the north east coast of England. Yorkshire was considered a battleground in the election with many marginal constituencies including Scarborough and Whitby on the North Yorkshire coast. The constituency had been held by Labour under Tony Blair. Like many coastal constituencies that depend on farming and tourism. This is typical of other seats in the sea wall election battleground. Scarborough and Whitby was a traditional Conservative seat which voted Labour in 1997 for the first time since the seat's creation in 1918.

The Whitby woman was identified as in her 60s and previously was a reliable voter for the Conservative Party. She may have voted for New Labour in the 1997 general election. She may be working class, is non-university educated and is described as having traditional values. In particularly she cares about the triple lock on the State Pension. The Whitby woman voted for Brexit in 2016 and for Boris Johnson in 2019. They had disapproved of the government and were undecided voters by 2024. YouGov had projected that Scarborough and Whitby had the potential of being a Labour gain.

In the 2024 United Kingdom general election, Labour candidate Alison Hume was elected member of Parliament (MP) for Scarborough and Whitby. In the 2019 United Kingdom general election, the Conservatives had won the seat with a majority of 10,000 votes.

== See also ==
- Bellwether
- Blue wall
- Essex man
- Holby City woman
- Placeholder name
- Politics of the United Kingdom
- Middle England
- Motorway man
- Red wall
- Sea wall
- Stevenage woman
- Workington man
- Worcester woman
