= Sea wall (British politics) =

British political term

Results of coastal constituencies within England and Wales at the 2024 general election: Labour Party Conservative Party Liberal Democrats Reform UK Green Party Plaid Cymru

In British politics, the sea wall consists of the 108 constituencies along the coastline of England and Wales, which are generalised as marginal. Before the July 2024 election, most of these constituencies were held by the Conservatives, though many were marginal enough to be vulnerable to Labour according to opinion polls. The sea wall overlaps both the Red and Blue walls, and was described in some coverage of the 2024 general election. From the 2019 general election to July 2024, Labour held 24 of these seats.

These seats in England and Wales are noted, relative to the national average, for deprivation. They are personified by tourism-based economies, the cost of living crisis, and poor connectivity. Coastal residents bring home on average lower wages. The availability of affordable housing has also been an issue.

Before the 2024 general election, the think tank Onward called coastal areas “the forgotten battleground that could decide [this] election”.

== Background ==
The term was used 2022 local elections when the Labour Party took majority control of Worthing Borough Council just five years after winning their first councillor in the district. Labour are considered to be competitive in Conservative areas within the South like Plymouth, Bournemouth, Southampton, and Portsmouth.

Research from the Fabian Society was reported on that Labour had unprecedented polling leads over the Conservatives. The "sea wall" was regarded by them as an important area for the 2024 general election. YouGov polling showed that 44% of voters in the Sea wall said they would never consider voting Conservative.

Jaywick in Tendring District in Essex is the most deprived neighbourhood in England. The Clacton constituency was noted for being the only place to elect a UKIP MP in a general election. Since Brexit, Conservative support in coastal areas that voted Leave has been waning. On 3 June 2024, Nigel Farage took over Reform UK and announced his candidacy in Clacton, eventually winning Clacton in the 2024 United Kingdom general election.

== Elections in the 2020s ==
Labour won the 2024 Blackpool South by-election with a large swing. Channel 4 reported during the 2024 election that the coastal towns in the sea wall would determine the election.

In the 2024 United Kingdom general election, Labour had a breakthrough in coastal England, winning coastal areas they never had before in Cornwall, Dorset, Somerset, the Isle of Wight, West Sussex, Kent, Norfolk and Essex.

== See also ==
- Bellwether
- Blue wall
- Essex man
- Holby City woman
- Middle England
- Motorway man
- Placeholder name
- Politics of the United Kingdom
- Red wall
- Stevenage woman
- Worcester woman
- Workington man
