= Stevenage woman =

UK electoral stereotype

Stevenage Town Centre

Stevenage woman is a stereotypical voter identified in the United Kingdom, similar to Workington man or Worcester woman. It profiles a suburban mother in her early 40s who is disillusioned with politics. Identified with the Hertfordshire new town of Stevenage, Stevenage woman has been described as an important swing voter for the Labour Party in the 2024 general election. Such voters are identified as typically struggling with stagnant wages and the cost-of-living crisis.

In April 2023, a report from Labour Together mentioned the term Stevenage woman. They may have voted for Boris Johnson in the 2019 general election, but since then has leaned towards Labour. Sky News has reported the Stevenage women were concerned about the cost of living crisis in the runup to the 2024 United Kingdom budget.

Other female voters identified include Nuneaton woman and Whitby woman.

In the 2024 United Kingdom general election, Stevenage constituency swung from Conservative to Labour.

== See also ==
- Bellwether
- Blue wall
- Essex man
- Holby City woman
- Placeholder name
- Politics of the United Kingdom
- Middle England
- Motorway man
- Red wall
- Sea wall
- Whitby woman
- Workington man
- Worcester woman
