= Sanders–Trump voters =

Voter electorate in the United States

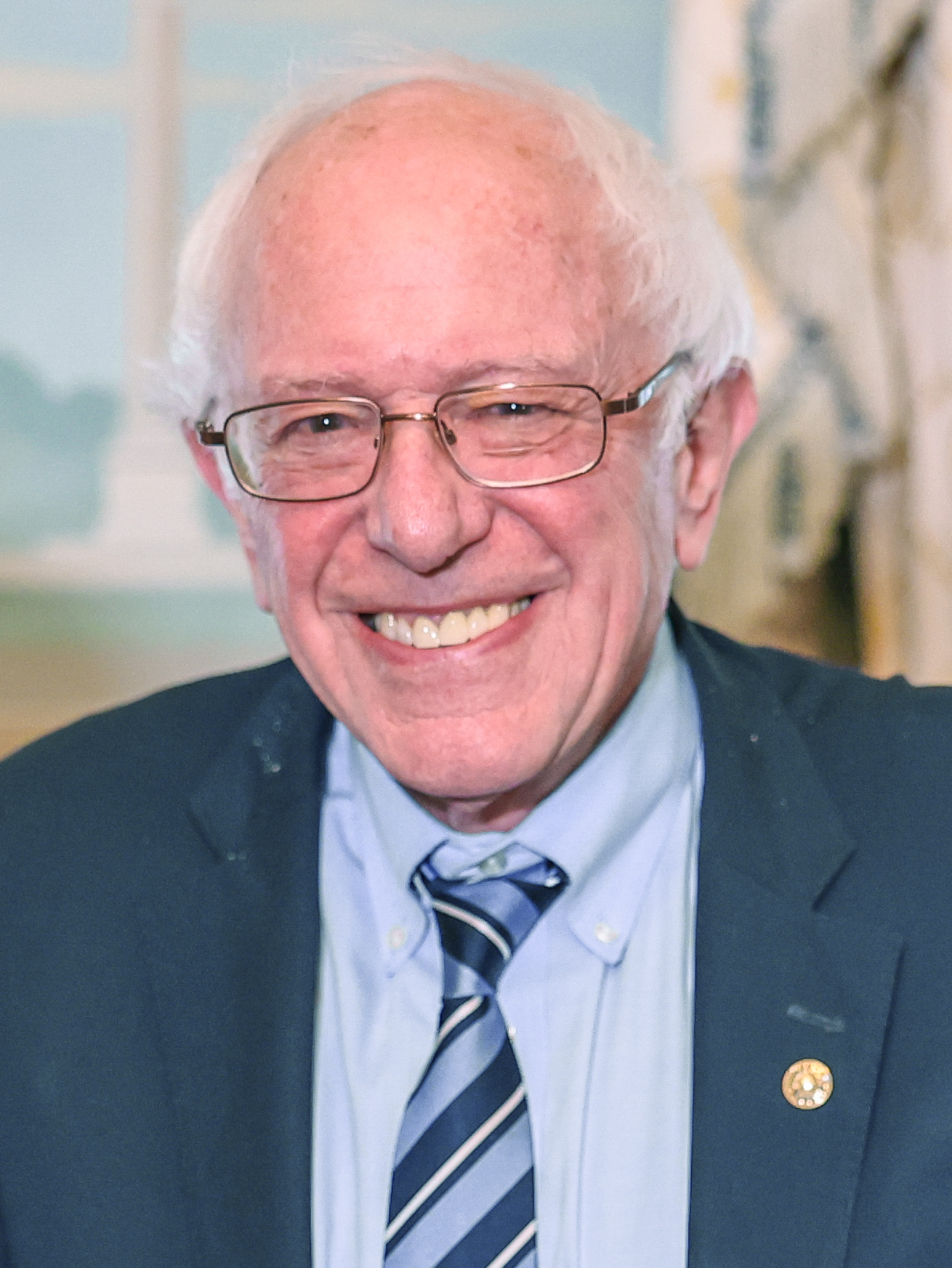
Bernie Sanders

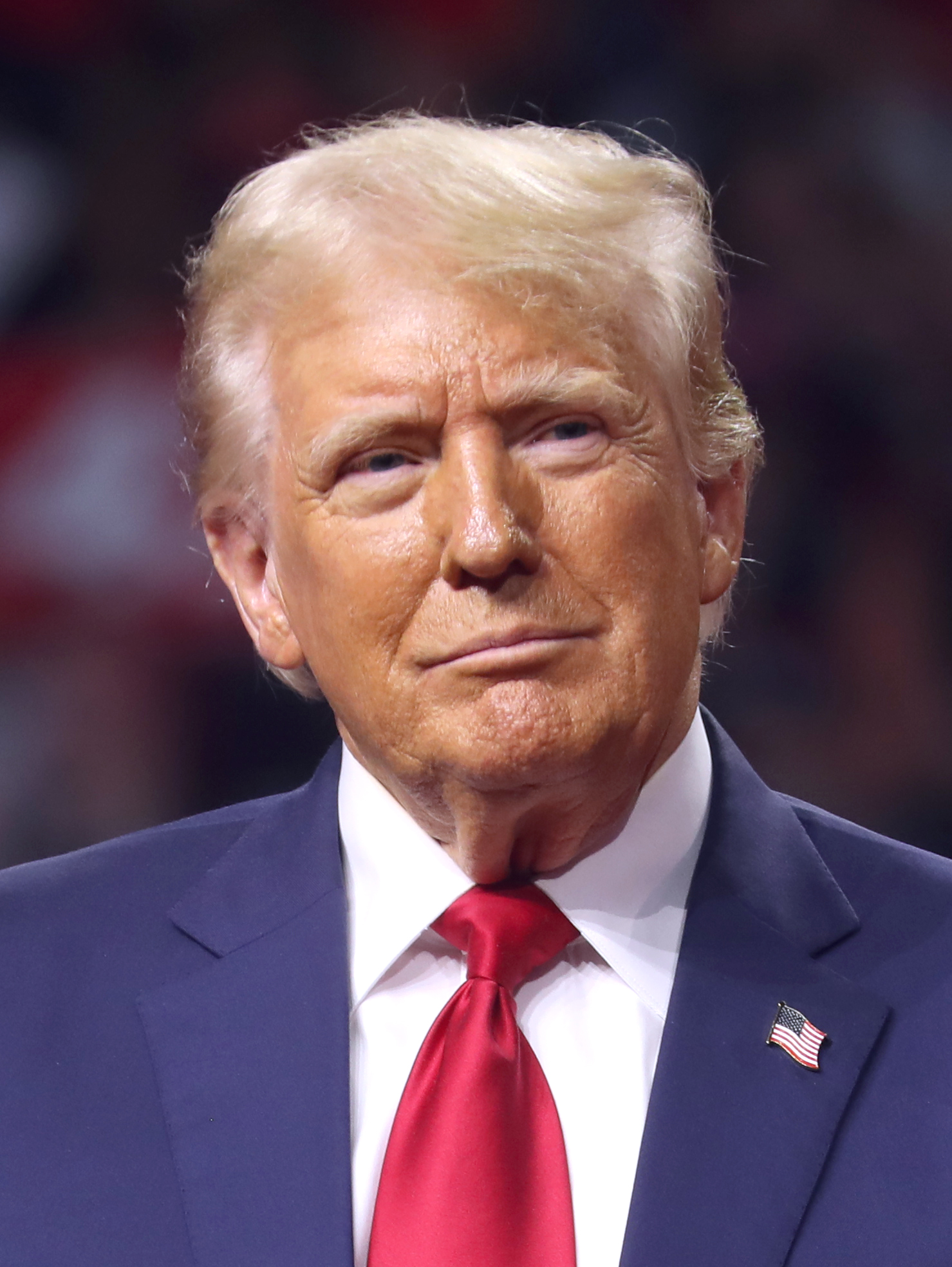
Donald Trump

In the United States, Sanders–Trump voters, also known as Bernie–Trump voters, are the voter electorate that voted for Bernie Sanders in the 2016 or 2020 Democratic Party presidential primaries (or both), but who subsequently voted for Republican Party nominee Donald Trump in the general election. In the 2016 U.S. presidential election, these voters composed an estimated 6%–12% of Sanders supporters. At least another 12% of Sanders supporters did not vote for Democratic Party nominee Hillary Clinton, but also did not vote for Trump.

The extent to which these voters were decisive in Trump's 2016 victory and their effect on the 2020 U.S. presidential election have been a subject of debate. Compared to other Sanders voters, Sanders–Trump voters have more conservative views on social and gender issues and are less likely to identify as Democrats.

== 2016 election ==
=== Studies ===
The Cooperative Congressional Election Study (CCES), an election survey of about 50,000 people, found that 12% of Sanders voters voted for Trump in 2016. In the states of Michigan, Pennsylvania, and Wisconsin, the number of Sanders–Trump voters was more than two times Trump's margin of victory in those states. Some analysts, such as Economist data journalist G. Elliott Morris, have argued that these voters disproportionately impacted the 2016 election. Others, including political scientist Brian Schaffner, who served as a co-Principal Investigator in the CCES survey, have said that Trump's margin of victory was small enough that Sanders–Trump voters were merely one voting bloc out of many that could have decided the outcome, and that "defections" between a primary and a general election are quite common. By every estimate, Obama–Trump voters—voters who had previously voted for Barack Obama but voted for Trump in 2016—vastly outnumber Sanders-to-Trump voters, accounting for about 14% of Trump's total vote.

The 2016 VOTER survey conducted by YouGov, which interviewed 8,000 respondents in July and December 2016, found that 12% of those who preferred Sanders in the primary preferred Trump in the general election. The RAND Presidential Election Panel Survey, which interviewed the same group of around 3,000 respondents six times during the campaign, found that 6% of those who reported supporting Sanders in March reported supporting Trump in November. A November 2016 poll conducted by ABC News and The Washington Post only days before the general election showed 8% of Sanders supporters intended to vote for Trump or had voted for him. Unlike the CCES survey, these surveys did not validate the turnout of those surveyed, while CCES was limited to examining only voters whose participation in both the primaries and general election could be verified via voter file data, which excluded those who voted in caucuses or party-run primaries.

=== Analysis ===
In an interview with Vox, Schaffner highlighted the fact that Sanders–Trump voters were much less likely to identify as Democrats than Sanders voters who voted for Clinton or a third-party candidate. According to Schaffner, about half of the voting bloc identified themselves as Republicans or independents. Data from the VOTER survey showed that only 35% of Sanders–Trump voters voted for Democratic incumbent Barack Obama in the 2012 election; in contrast, 95% of Sanders–Clinton voters voted for Obama in 2012.

2012 election results in Wisconsin, Obama +6.94%

2016 Wisconsin Democratic presidential primary results, Sanders +13.54%

2016 election results in Wisconsin, Trump +0.77%

Compared to average Democratic Party voters, Sanders–Trump voters were much more conservative on racial and social issues. Over 40% of Sanders–Trump voters disagreed that white people have advantages, compared to less than 10% of Sanders voters who voted for Clinton. Compared to the average Sanders voter, Sanders–Trump voters tend to be white and older. The CCES survey showed that only between 17% and 18% of Sanders–Trump voters identified themselves as ideologically liberal, with the rest either identifying as moderate or conservative. In the VOTER survey, Sanders–Trump voters rated minority groups less favorably than Sanders–Clinton voters; this included Latinos, Muslims and LGBT people. According to both the CCES and VOTER surveys, Sanders–Trump voters' views on trade policy are largely similar to typical Democrats, despite Sanders' relative opposition to free trade deals.

Jeff Stein of Vox suggested that many Sanders–Trump voters may have been Reagan Democrats who were white and pro-union. Political scientist John M. Sides suggested that many Sanders–Trump voters were unlikely to support Clinton in the first place. Writing in RealClearPolitics, Tim Chapman, executive director of conservative advocacy group Heritage Action, suggested that both Trump and Sanders had strong populist appeal, especially to working-class voters in the heartland, despite their starkly different policies. In 2020, Schaffner suggested that Sanders' appeal to Sanders–Trump voters in 2016 was due to his outsider status, his populist policies, and his targeting of issues which affected groups of people Trump attempted to court in his 2016 campaign.

== 2020 election ==
Sanders–Trump voters were cited as a potential deciding factor in the 2020 United States presidential election. According to a February 2020 NBC News/Wall Street Journal poll, about 7% of respondents who said they were enthusiastic about or comfortable with Sanders in the 2020 election voted for Trump in 2016. In March 2020, Schaffner suggested that if Sanders were the Democratic nominee in the 2020 general election, Sanders would be able to target some but not all of those who voted Sanders–Trump in 2016. Philippe Reines, a longtime Clinton adviser, suggested that whether this group of voters would vote for Democratic nominee Joe Biden in the general election depended on Sanders' efforts to demonstrate his support for Biden.

There was no consensus between pre-election forecasters on the potential effect of Sanders–Trump voters on the 2020 election. In March 2019, Grace Sparks of CNN suggested that Sanders–Trump voters were unlikely to be significant in 2020, pointing to early polling which showed little overlap in support between Sanders and Trump. According to a March 2020 ABC News/Washington Post poll, 15% of Sanders voters (corresponding to 6% of leaned Democrats) planned to vote for Trump, while 80% planned to vote for Biden. A March 2020 Morning Consult poll showed that although Sanders supporters were less likely to vote for Biden than the average Democrat, they were also less likely to "defect" to Trump compared to 2016. Citing exit polls on the 2020 South Carolina Democratic presidential primary, Washington Examiner columnist Timothy P. Carney suggested that Sanders voters were demographically similar to Trump voters.

== See also ==
- Anti-establishment
- Essex man
- Haley Voters for Harris
- Horseshoe theory
- List of Democrats who opposed the Hillary Clinton 2016 presidential campaign
- MAGA communism
- Obama–Trump voters
- People's Party (United States, 2017)
- Populism in the United States
- Reagan Democrat
- Red wall (British politics)
- Swing vote
- Workington man
