= Red/blue provinces (Canada) =

In Canada, red provinces are the provinces that consistently vote for the Liberal Party, whereas blue provinces tend to support the Conservative Party. Regionally, the West is heavily blue (except the BC Coast) and Eastern provinces are red.

Differing from the U.S., red is associated with liberalism while blue represents conservatism.

Since the turn of the millennium, Western Canada has voted "blue" in all but two federal elections, 2015 and 2025, while Eastern Canada voted "red" in all but four elections, 2004, 2006, 2008 and 2011.

== Red wall ==

Canada's red wall includes Ontario, Quebec, and the Atlantic provinces which vote red, strongly favouring the Liberals.

During 2015, Atlantic Canada ridings were entirely swept by the Liberals. In 2025, the Liberals won 25/32 ridings.

== Orange islands ==
The term orange islands is used to describe local areas within red or blue provinces that support the New Democratic Party (NDP). Historically these are urban, majority minority, and working class.

== See also ==
- Red states and blue states (U.S.)
- Red wall (U.K.)
- Blue wall (U.K.)
