= Southern Discomfort =

Southern Discomfort may refer to:

- Southern Discomfort (Rita Mae Brown novel), a novel released in 1982 by Rita Mae Brown
- Southern Discomfort (Eyehategod album), an album released in 2000 by sludge metal band Eyehategod
- Southern Discomfort (Rehab album), is an album released in 2000 by rock band Rehab
- Southern Discomfort (Fabian Society pamphlets), a series of pamphlets that examined attitudes to the British Labour Party in the south of England
- Southern Discomfort Roller Derby, a men's roller derby league based in London
- "Southern Discomfort", an episode of the seventh season of The Real Housewives of Atlanta, an American reality television series
- The Mask: Southern Discomfort, a 1996 comic book limited series published by Dark Horse Comics
