= ThinkLabour =

British think tank

- Formation: June 2015 (11 years ago)
- Founder: John Clarke
- Location: London, United Kingdom
- Interim Director: Ed Owen
- Website: labourtogether.uk
- Formerly called: Common Good Labour, Labour Together

ThinkLabour, formerly known as Labour Together and Common Good Labour, is a British think tank closely associated with the right wing of the Labour Party. Founded in June 2015 with the initial aim of bridging Labour factions, it switched its focus to opposing the leadership of Jeremy Corbyn and later supported Keir Starmer in the 2020 Labour Party leadership election. It works to measure public opinion and develop political policy. Its leading architect was Morgan McSweeney. The group supported Labour in the 2024 general election, as well as for a second term in government.

It is regarded by The Guardian, Politico, The Times, and Business Insider as a highly influential group upon the Starmer-led Labour Party, and seen as an "incubator" of its 2024 manifesto. It has sought to resemble the centre-right think tank Onward.

As Labour Together, the group failed to declare £730,000 of donations from millionaire venture capitalists and businessmen between 2017 and 2020. The organisation was fined and found guilty of over 20 separate breaches of the law. In 2025 it was reported that they had paid private investigators to run a smear campaign against prominent journalists investigating "Operation Red Shield", Labour Together's campaign to marginalise the Labour left.

The organisation rebranded to ThinkLabour in 2026.

== History ==
=== 2015–2017: Formation ===
The organisation was set up in June 2015 by John Clarke, a former Blue Labour director, under the name Common Good Labour (renamed Labour Together on 1 September that year), following the Labour Party defeat in the 2015 general election and the resignation of its leader Ed Miliband, intending to capitalise on Miliband's defeat. MP Jon Cruddas, in an attempt to prevent the wider party from fracturing, gathered other MPs including Steve Reed and Lisa Nandy to form the group. Clarke resigned less than a year after establishing the group, allowing Cruddas, Reed and Nandy to step forward as leaders. Labour Together during this time has been described by The Guardian as "initially such a broad church," with members such as former national coordinator of Momentum Laura Parker, as well as Miliband himself. As described by Steve Reed MP "Labour Together is the new unity project open to everyone in our party. It's for supporters of any of the leadership candidates, for people who know that what unites us is bigger than what divides us."

The group involved members from both New Labour and Blue Labour, and by October 2015 had also recruited Chuka Umunna, Tristram Hunt and Maurice Glasman. Cruddas commented on the group's formation in The Observer that same month, stating that "in the 2015 leadership election we surrendered the argument on devolution. Labour is stuck in an unpopular, outdated politics of taxing and spending and using state control", and that this had placed Labour "into a situation in which a Tory chancellor looks more in tune with our Labour councils in the north than the Labour party itself." Labour Together existed alongside other groups associated with the right wing such as Labour for the Common Good.

On 31 May 2016, Nandy officially announced the launch of Labour Together, chaired by Cruddas. Before the launch, on 25 May, the group announced a "communities fund" for donations as well as an academy with the aim of teaching party members about campaigning, organising and leadership. The group received initial funding from Nevsky Capital founder Martin Taylor and Trevor Chinn, the latter of whom was appointed as Labour Together's director after donating £10,000. Members often met in parliament or at the House of St Barnabas. The group received initial funding of £75,000 to cover early research and its first staff member, growing to approximately £150,000 over three years. By the time of the 2020 Labour leadership campaign, the group had received about half a million pounds in funding.

=== 2017–2020: Support of Keir Starmer for Labour Party leadership ===
In 2017, Morgan McSweeney took over as director of the organisation at its offices in Vauxhall, responsible to a board which included Reed, Nandy, Cruddas and Chinn. The purpose of the group was to remove Jeremy Corbyn from the leadership position "by any means necessary". This was primarily achieved by exploiting the issue of anti-semitism. McSweeney wrote in an early confidential strategy paper, that the group would cultivate "seemingly independent voices to generate and share content to build up a political narrative and challenge fake news and political extremism." They also launched a "Stop funding fake news" campaign targeting websites they considered alt-left or alt-right, which included identifying articles they deemed to contain racist or fake content and contacting advertisers on these sites.

Internal documents from the period, later obtained by The Guardian, showed Labour Together's strategic assessment of the party's situation. A document sent to prospective donors warned that the "Hard left [...] will divide our party, condemn us to electoral defeat, attempt to drive out democratic socialists and corrupt our moral purpose in the interest of ideological aims".

Labour Together relaunched with an unofficial purpose to dissuade moderate MPs from starting a breakaway group after the success of Corbyn in the 2015 Labour leadership election, as well as to obtain control of the party from the left. It obtained new funding from donors opposed to Corbyn's leadership, with the donations being reported to the Electoral Commission until December 2017, when the organisation largely stopped reporting them. The Times has stated that after this point, "Labour Together was starting to raise money on a scale and at a speed rarely seen in British politics." Further donations were made in 2018 by Paul Myners, Clive Hollick, Simon Tuttle, Sean Wadsworth and Richard Greer.

Labour Together polled party members on their policy priorities, splitting members into "instrumentalists" (who would vote for any leader that they thought would win the next election), "idealists" (who projected onto Corbyn what they wanted of him), and "ideologues" (who initially signed up to Labour in the 1970s and 1980s, left or were removed, and then rejoined for Corbyn). The group decided that a successor to Corbyn would need to appeal to all of the "instrumentalists" and over one third of the "idealists", and would need to have served under and backed Corbyn, eventually picking Keir Starmer.

Some members of the group backed Starmer in the 2020 Labour leadership election, endorsing McSweeney to be his campaign director, with whom Starmer won the leadership with 56.2% of the vote. During the campaign, Labour Together raised £160,000 to fund a cross factional Election Review, and its financial supporters donated £205,000 in total to Starmer, which amounted to 30% of Starmer's cash donations over the campaign's course. These donations were not declared and the group claimed not to back any candidate until after 2022, at which point its public statements began to state that it "played a key role in Keir Starmer's leadership campaign." Starmer immediately appointed McSweeney as his chief of staff, making him the most senior adviser in the Labour Party. Hannah O'Rourke, former advisor to Tristram Hunt, took over as acting director.

=== 2017–2021: Electoral Commission investigation and fine ===
In December 2020, acting director Hannah O'Rourke filed a series of donation reports that, from 2017 until 2020, had not been filed within 30 days as required by the Political Parties, Elections and Referendums Act 2000. Labour Together was investigated by the Electoral Commission from January 2021 for failing to declare over £800,000 of donations within 30 days, £730,000 of which was not disclosed when McSweeney was director. McSweeney had falsely asserted in a January 2019 meeting in parliament that donations were being declared fully and promptly. The investigation became public in February 2021, when Business Insider revealed that only £165,000 of the £970,492 donated between October 2015 and January 2021 had been declared within the specified period. O'Rourke stated that this "administrative oversight" was "entirely unintentional" and asserted that "we are now fully transparent and compliant with regards to our donations, and are cooperating fully with the Electoral Commission to assist them in their ongoing inquiry." Following this, the Electoral Commission stated that "admin error" was not a reasonable excuse, and fined Labour Together £14,250 in September 2021 after finding it had committed over 20 offences under electoral law, including disclosures with incorrect information and a failure to appoint a "responsible person" for declaring funds.

=== 2020–2022: Election review ===
During the 2020 Labour Leadership Election, Labour Together convened a cross party review of 2019 Election convened by its acting director Hannah O'Rourke. The review was led by 15 Commissioners from across the party. "We intentionally designed our review so that our whole movement can feel part of it, because the process of constructing a project that involves all our traditions is as important as what we conclude." The analysis was drawn from the combined insights from over 11,000 survey responses from Labour members, supporters, and former voters, alongside more than 50 in depth interviews with activists, organisers and party staff, Labour candidates and MEPs across the UK. It was supported by submissions from groups across the movement including Momentum, Progress, Labour Business, English Labour Network, a Labour LGA councillors’ survey, Labour's Community Organising Unit and affiliated Trade Unions including Unite. The review was described in Labour List as being "welcomed by party across factions".

The Election Review concluded that for Labour to win the next election, it would need to win over "hero voters" and the red wall, who in the 2019 general election had voted for the Conservative Party.

Continuing its cross-party work, in early 2022 Labour Together published Labour's Covenant: A Plan for National Reconstruction, authored by Jonathan Rutherford. The work was the culmination of a project that involved over 100 policy advisers, academics, journalists and think tank experts, along with Labour mayors, councillors and MPs, from across the party, to discuss Labour's political renewal. Ten working groups produced over 50 papers in over 40 webinar discussions.

=== 2022–2024: Relaunch as a policy think tank and general election campaign ===
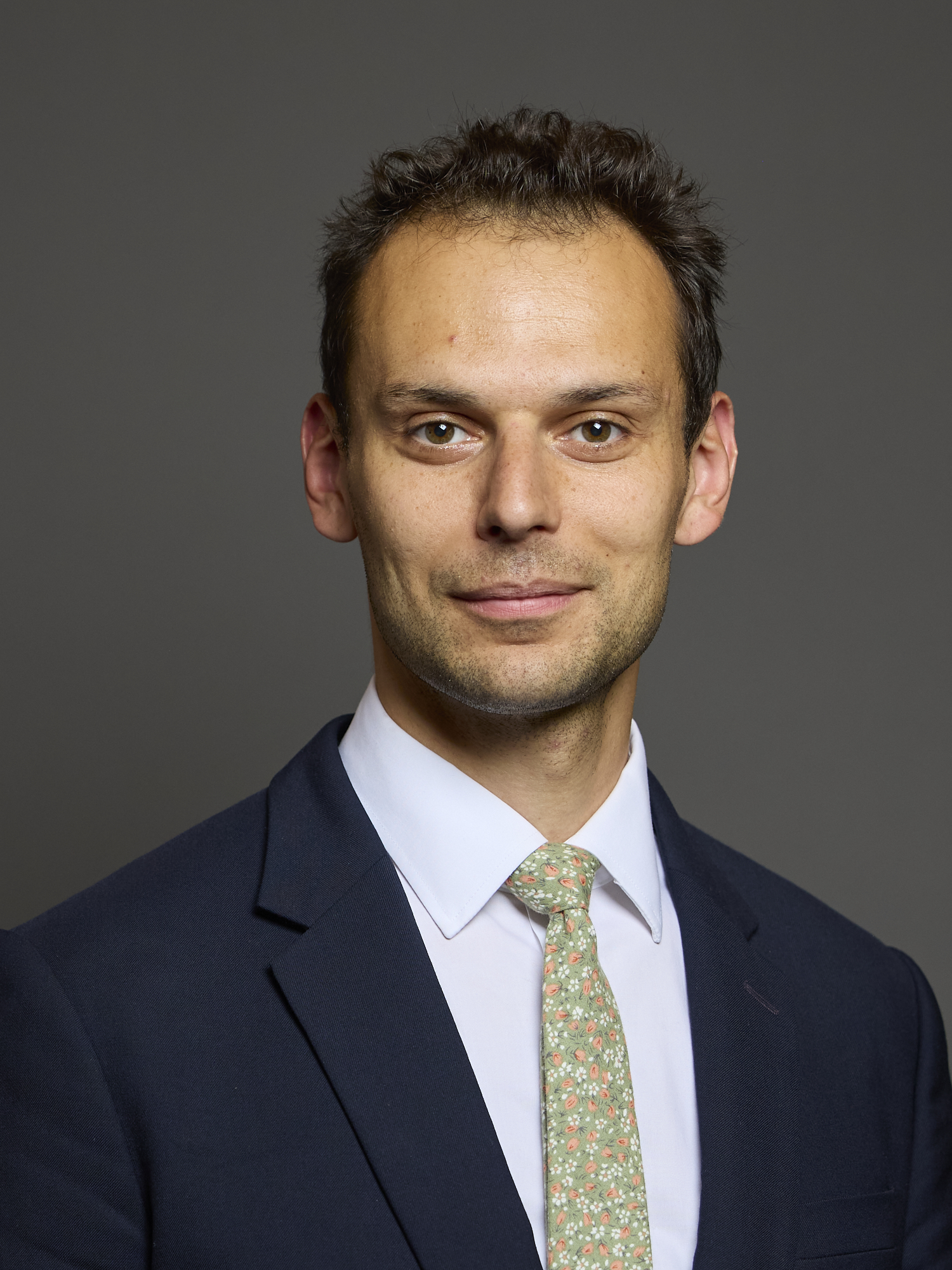
Josh Simons became Labour Together director in 2022, relaunching it "as a political think tank."

In 2022, Josh Simons, a former Corbyn policy advisor who had resigned after being demoted for suspected leaking, in his words in protest due to accusations of antisemitism in the party, took over as director of the group. He stated in 2023 that "now, Labour Together has relaunched as a political think tank." This was a change in direction compared to its previous purpose as a network aiming to bridge build within the party. Lisa Nandy objected to the relaunch. The group focused on "security" as a central campaign theme, and based Labour Together's strategy on the Conservative think tank Onward. A report from the group on 29 March 2023, one of its first major attempts at profiling the full British electorate, identified the "Stevenage woman" in addition to the "Workington man" as critical to a Labour election victory. In the summer of 2023, Labour Together founder Jon Cruddas left the organisation, claiming that Labour was under the control of a "rightwing, illiberal" faction. He also stated that "there's been a lot of ‘boasting’ on Labour Together's work within the party," and that "many are reinterpreting history for their own purposes."

As of October 2023 Labour Together had received over £1.8 million in donations after Starmer became leader, with the three biggest donors being Martin Taylor, Trevor Chinn and Gary Lubner. It kept significant contact with McSweeney, who had since become Labour's campaign director, as well as Labour's strategy director Deborah Mattinson, policy chief Stuart Ingham, and Shadow Chancellor of the Exchequer Rachel Reeves. In October 2023, Politico noted that "nearly all the MPs credited with building Labour Together since 2017 — Reeves, Wes Streeting, Shabana Mahmood, Steve Reed, Bridget Phillipson, Lucy Powell and Lisa Nandy — now sit in Starmer's top team." That month, it appointed an advisory board which included Helen Thompson, Alan Milburn and pollster Andrew Cooper, and also hired former pollster Chris Curtis for its polling operations. Labour Together was described by Andrew Marr as "as near as Starmer's Labour has to an emotional core." It published policy papers on investment, technology, artificial intelligence, climate, constitutional reform, and geopolitics, which included China.

By 2 June 2024, the group had received £1.92 million in donations from the start of that year, including a £1.3 million donation from a millionaire hedge fund manager. Records from Companies House state that Francesca Perrin, one of Labour Together's largest donors, had become a director at the organisation. In June 2024, the Labour left-oriented Tribune magazine has suggested Labour Together is a "big money operation", highlighting large donors including Trevor Chinn, Martin Taylor, Ian Laming, and William Reeves, to label the think tank an "undemocratic, multimillionaire-funded structure". At the 2024 general election, five staff or policy fellows (Simons, Miatta Fahnbulleh, Hamish Falconer, Chris Curtis, and Gordon McKee) became Labour MPs.

=== 2024–present: Working with Labour in government ===
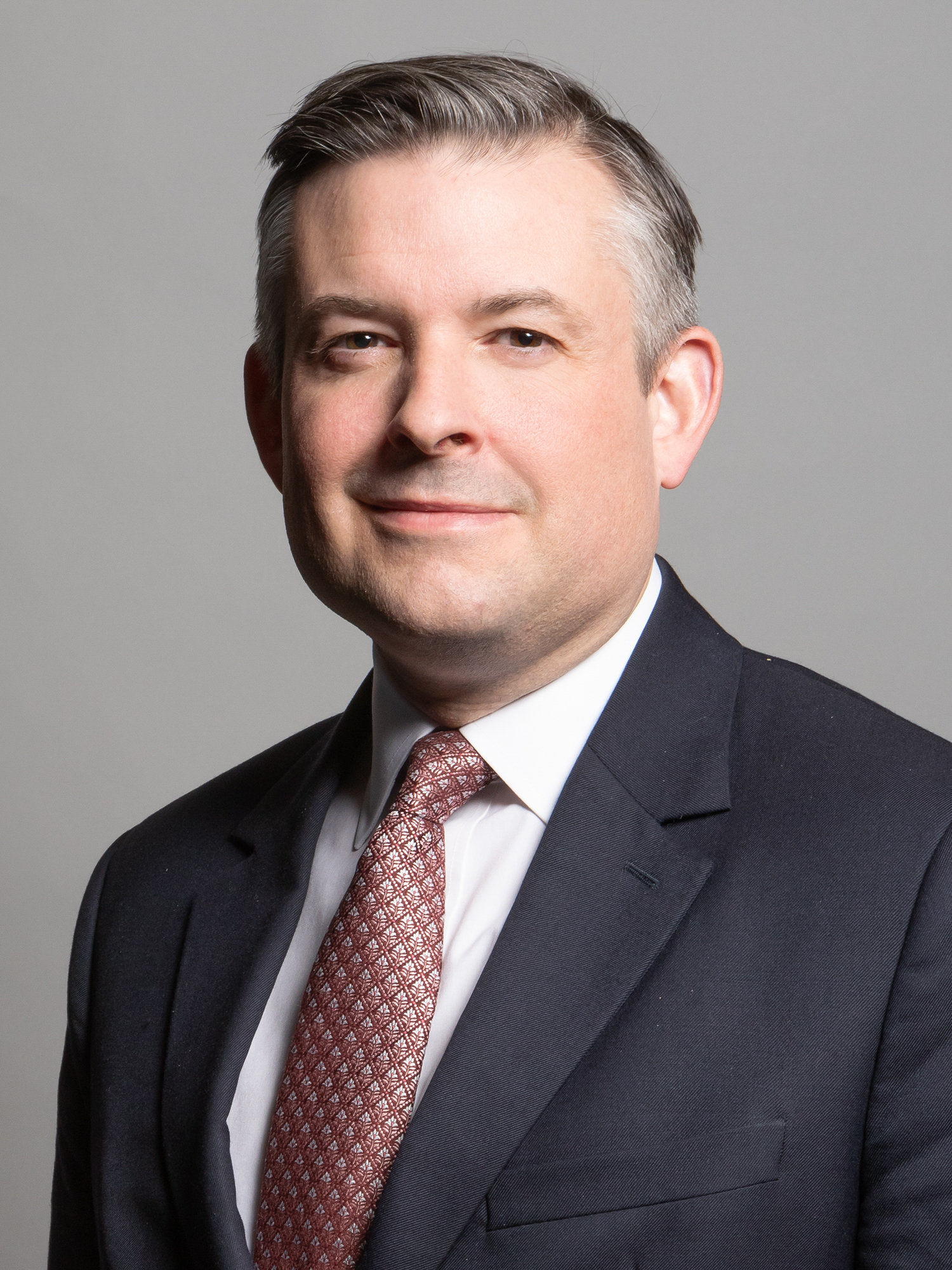
Jonathan Ashworth became director after losing his seat during Labour's victory in the July 2024 general election

It was announced on 9 July 2024 that outgoing Labour MP Jonathan Ashworth, who narrowly lost his seat, was Labour Together's new director. Ashworth has close connections with Starmer's leadership team, having served in Starmer's shadow cabinet until his defeat at the election. By October, Labour Together had given donations totalling £1.5 million to over 100 different Labour MPs, ranging from donations of £5,000 to £137,168. The same month, the group published a report recommending that regional and city mayors be given more power over their budgets and public services. The group pushed Starmer's government to set "long-term targets" to reduce immigration, as well as to "de-risk" supply chains by reducing reliances on China for critical minerals, in December 2024.

In January 2025, The Times reported that the group had made redundancies, with up to 15% of staff leaving since the previous summer. One of these sources stated that Labour Together lacked "much of a purpose or sense of direction anymore", with few appearances from Ashworth and its director of policy Matthew Upton making decisions instead. One Labour Together member said that the group had "moved away from being a think tank that speaks publicly about policy", instead turning to "influencing government policy through private conversations with ministers and special advisers". The paper highlighted that the think tank was "losing staff and donors" and was "faltering under the leadership" of Ashworth, with MPs reporting receiving an increasing number of job applications from staff at Labour Together and funders turning their attention to other think tanks aligned with the Starmer leadership. In March the government discussed plans laid out by the think tank for the restructuring of NHS England and other quangos. These plans were dubbed "project chainsaw", in reference to a stunt by Elon Musk in which he wielded a chainsaw to symbolise government cuts. In July 2025, Jonathan Ashworth stood down as the organisation’s CEO and in September was replaced by Alison Phillips, former editor of the Daily Mirror.

Labour Together were criticised by charity Asylum Matters over what was alleged to be their "Farage-flavoured approach" to migration policy, and encouraging the Labour government to "[play] with fire" by leaning "into the anti-migrant policies and rhetoric employed by the populist far-right across Europe". The LabourList article went on to say that Labour Together was proposing directions that lead to 'the road to a ruinous breakdown of community cohesion and the house of cards that is the progressive electoral coalition that brought Labour to power in the first place.'

=== 2025–2026: The Fraud and Operation Cannon ===
In September 2025, Labour Together was reported by The National to have hired private investigators to go after author and journalist Paul Holden, who wrote a book on Starmer entitled The Fraud, and anti-corruption campaigner Andrew Feinstein, who had stood against Starmer in his constituency of Holborn and St Pancras at the 2024 general election. Paul Ovenden, Starmer's director of political strategy, resigned after Holden notified ITV News of text messages made by Ovenden. ITV published the texts, which contained offensive sexual comments about Diane Abbott.

Five months later, The Times revealed that Labour Together had paid £36,000 to American public relations firm APCO to discredit journalist Gabriel Pogrund, and by extension The Sunday Times, by falsely suggesting its journalists might be part of a Russian conspiracy or had relied on emails hacked by the Russian government. Paul Holden was also investigated because he provided documents for the Sunday Times article. According to The Sunday Times, Labour Together commissioned APCO in November 2023 after The Sunday Times published a report on Labour Together's failure to declare £730,000 of donations between 2017 and 2020. APCO’s report was named "Operation Cannon", and was allegedly made with the full knowledge of Morgan McSweeney who was heavily criticised in the Sunday Times article. APCO’s report made various false claims about Pogrund's journalism, Jewish faith and relationships, whilst concluding that the emails that Pogrund had used in his article were leaked from Russian hacks. Neither Pogrund or Yorke were made aware of APCO’s investigations. A shortened version of APCO’s report was shared with British intelligence agency GCHQ, which declined to investigate the claims. The Public Relations and Communications Association launched an investigation into the incident in February 2026. Starmer ordered the Cabinet Office to investigate Josh Simons, who was head of Labour Together, over the claims that Labour Together had commissioned the report into a journalist's background. On 28 February, Simons resigned from his government postings over his involvement with Operation Cannon.

=== 2026 rebrand: ThinkLabour ===
Labour Together received a fine of £14,250 for over 20 breaches of electoral law. In response, it was announced in April 2026 that the think tank would completely overhaul its operations and change its name to ThinkLabour. Chief executive Alison Phillips stated that ThinkLabour would no longer donate to individual MPs, endorse candidates or second its staff into ministerial offices. The rebrand officially took effect in May 2026. In July 2026, Phillips left her role as CEO of Labour Together and assumed office as Downing Street Transition Director, she was replaced by Labour Together's Executive Director of Political Strategy, Ed Owen, who will serve as Interim CEO until a permanent one can be chosen in 6 months.
