= Jim Pickard =

British political commentator

- Citizenship: United Kingdom
- Education: University of Bristol
- Occupations: Journalist; Political analyst
- Employer: The Financial Times

Jim Pickard is a British journalist and the current deputy political editor at the Financial Times. Pickard joined the FT in 1999 and became chief political correspondent for the paper in 2013.

Pickard coined the political term motorway man in the run up to the 2010 general election.

In 2019 he was part of a FT team which won "Political Journalism" at the British Journalism Awards of the Press Gazette for a series about Jeremy Corbyn's Labour party.

In March 2021 he was involved in the Financial Times' reporting of David Cameron's lobbying for Greensill Capital.
