= Haley Voters for Harris =

American political action committee

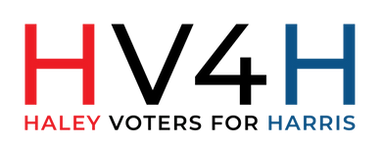
- Founded: March 6, 2024
- Type: PAC
- Headquarters: United States
- Formerly called: Haley Voters for Biden

Haley Voters for Harris (HV4H) was an American political action committee (PAC) that consists of former supporters of Nikki Haley's 2024 presidential campaign, who then supported Kamala Harris in the general election.

== Background ==
The organization said it was an outgrowth of Primary Pivot, a group that encouraged Democrats and Independents to vote for Nikki Haley in the primaries.

The organization was founded on March 6, 2024, under the name Haley Voters for Biden (HV4B). This was the same day Haley suspended her presidential campaign.

The organization received a cease and desist letter from Haley in July 2024; the organization said they planned to ignore the letter. Haley said in a statement referencing the group that "Kamala Harris and I are total opposites on every issue. Any attempt to use my name to support her or her agenda is deceptive and wrong".

== Advertising campaign ==
The organization launched a seven-figure digital advertising campaign on October 2, 2024.

Issues targeted include Harris being the more conservative choice when it comes to the national debt, tax cuts for the middle class, and Trump's plans on tariffs.

== Messaging ==
Democracy was a major issue for a number of voters who used to support Nikki Haley but now supported Kamala Harris.

Eric LeVine criticized Trump for not embracing Nikki Haley and her supporters and instead embracing fringe figures like Robert F. Kennedy Jr. and Tulsi Gabbard.

The national debt was another issue motivating support among some former Haley voters for Kamala Harris.

Kamala Harris' experience as a prosecutor had appeal for some Haley voters.

The border is an issue that the organization had addressed, trying to educate voters about how the Biden-Harris administration pushed a bipartisan border bill to greatly expand the number of border agents beyond what Trump had proposed during his presidency.

The organization also pointed to greater oil production under Biden than Trump.

== Polling ==
New York Times/Siena polls in September and October found between 5-10% of Republicans had planned to vote for Kamala Harris.

A survey by Blueprint reported on October 9, 2024, found that among independent and Republican Nikki Haley voters, 36% had planned to vote for Kamala Harris and 45% for Donald Trump. The poll did not include Democrats or democratic-leaning independents. Joe Biden got the votes of 28% of those voters in 2020 compared with Trump receiving 59%, showing Harris performed better among this group.

== See also ==
- List of Republicans who opposed the Donald Trump 2024 presidential campaign
- Never Trump movement
- Republican and conservative support for Barack Obama in 2008
- Sanders–Trump voters
