= Middle Australia =

Socio-political term for middle class Australian people

The term "Middle Australian" is a socio-political term which generally refers to middle class or lower-middle class Australian people who hold traditional or right-wing views. As such, it does not refer to the geographical middle of the country, but rather to the socio-economic middle (as is also the primary meaning of the monikers "Middle America" or "Middle England").
