= Southern Discomfort (Fabian Society pamphlets) =

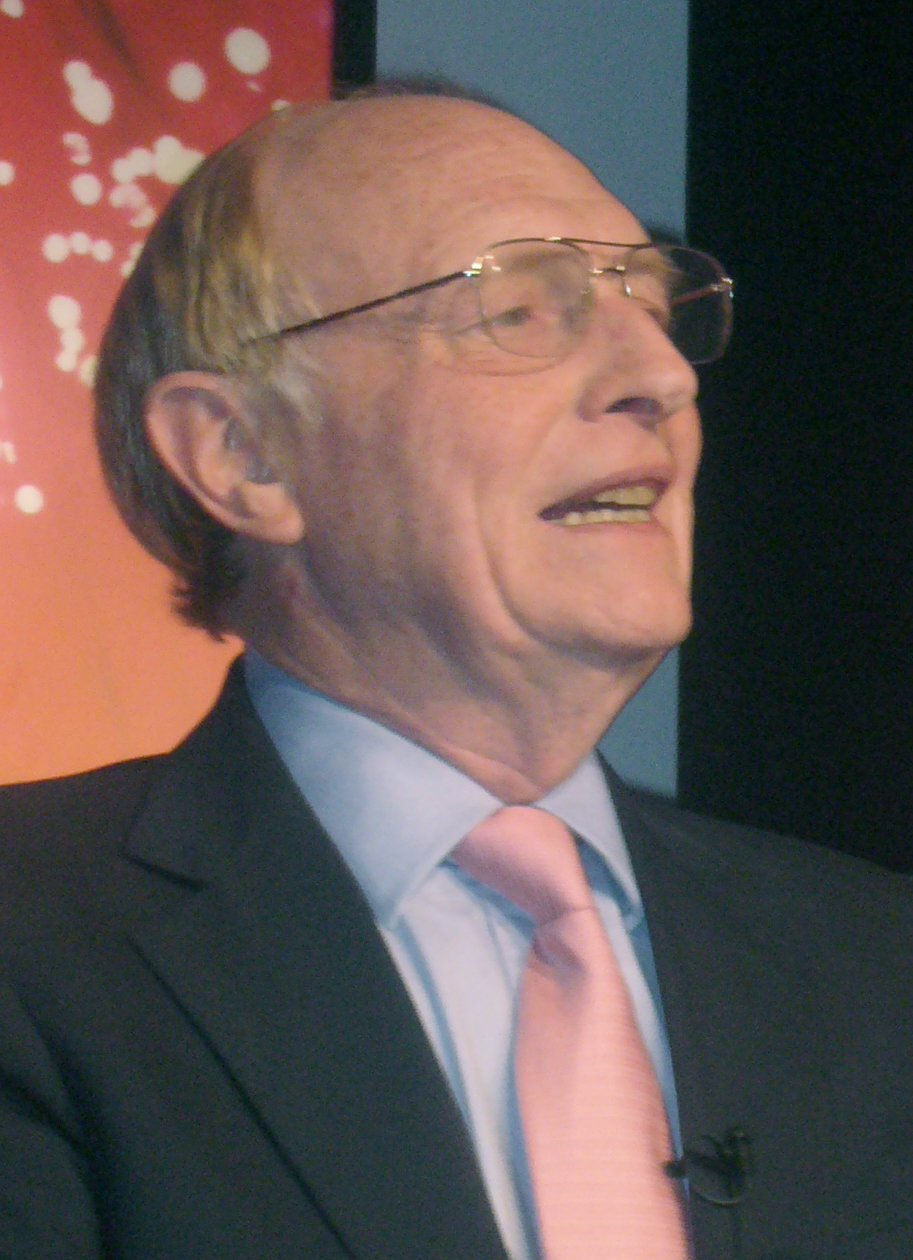
The Southern Discomfort studies examined why the Labour Party failed to win the 1992 General Election in which Neil Kinnock (pictured in 2007) unexpectedly lost to John Major.

The Southern Discomfort pamphlets were a series of studies by Labour MP Giles Radice, published by the Labour-affiliated think tank the Fabian Society that examined attitudes towards the party in the south of England after the 1992 general election defeat. The studies found that voters in marginal constituencies were concerned about Labour's lack of economic credibility and feared that their taxes would increase if party leader Neil Kinnock had won the election. The pamphlets were influential in underscoring the need for Labour to appeal to "C1" (white collar) and "C2" (skilled) voters (based on the NRS social grade classifications identifying class in the UK). The title is a reference to Southern Comfort, a well-known American liqueur. It had been widely expected that Labour would form a government as a result of the 1992 election. However, John Major unexpectedly led the Conservative Party to a fourth successive majority. At the next election in 1997, new Labour leader Tony Blair won a landslide victory, including in the southern areas identified by the pamphlets.

== 1990s Pamphlets ==
=== Southern Discomfort ===
The original pamphlet, published in September 1992, had three key chapters: "Labour's 'Southern' problem", "Why waverers did not vote Labour" and "What Labour must do". It was based on studies done in five marginal constituencies in the south of England which Labour had failed to win at the 1992 election: Gravesham, Harlow, Luton South, Slough and Stevenage. The party had only won ten seats in the south of England outside London, and Radice asserted that it would have to do better in this area to win power. He recommended that Labour show it was "The party of the individual", "Against vested interests", Opportunity for all" and "Managing capitalism better than the Tories". He also gave recommendations in the key policy areas of "Tax and spending", "Housing, education and health" and "Rights and electoral reform". By the time the work was written, John Smith had taken over from Neil Kinnock as party leader.

=== More Southern Discomfort : a year on - taxing and spending ===
The follow-up pamphlet, published in September 1993, returned to the same constituencies, and was co-authored by Fabian Research Officer Stephen Pollard. The findings were concentrated in three themed chapters: "Why southern voters matter", "Tax, spending and benefits" and "Lessons for Labour". In conclusion, it noted that "The southern 'floaters' feel let down by the Tories but do not yet trust Labour." Further to this, "They still think Labour is an old fashioned party, remote from their concerns and aspirations, wedded to high taxation and extravagant expenditure and not competent to run the country. Despite their disgust with the government, they still believe the Tories will win the next election." The authors recommended that Labour should consider "policies such as hypothecated taxes" "prove that it is no longer a trade union dominated party by giving individual members more say" and "demonstrate that it understands the modern world by rewriting Clause IV".

=== Any Southern Comfort? ===
The final Fabian pamphlet, published in September 1994, was again co-authored by Radice and Pollard, and the three main chapters were titled "Labour's lost voters", "What they now think" and "Labour on probation". The research again took place in Harlow, Luton and Slough, but this time added two marginal Midlands seats: Dudley West and Lincoln. This was done to test the original theory from Southern Discomfort that "the political attitudes of Labour's 'lost voters' in the South are increasingly shared by similar voters in other parts of the country". It concluded that "at a time when voters are deeply sceptical about politicians, the Labour Party must earn their trust." Tony Blair had become party leader since the previous pamphlet's publication, and the authors noted that the voters questioned had "a good initial impression" of him.

== 2010s Pamphlets ==
=== Southern Discomfort Again? ===
Following Labour's return to opposition as a result of the 2010 general election, a new study was published by Policy Network, examining the reasons for Labour's defeat in the south of England. It was once again co-authored by Radice, this time with Patrick Diamond, who had been head of policy planning in 10 Downing Street and senior policy adviser to the Prime Minister when Labour were in government. The purpose of the study was "to address the crippling weakness that Labour faces in Southern England following the 2010 defeat." The main chapters were titled "Labour's Southern problem: 2010", "Why Labour lost: party views", "Why wavering voters deserted Labour", "The new electoral battleground" and "What Labour must now do". It concluded that "If Labour takes into account the views of those voters that have deserted the party in recent years, it can re-emerge as the dominant progressive force in British politics, advancing its vision of a society where in R. H. Tawney's words every individual can have access to 'the means of civilisation', and once again become the natural party of government." Labour had been led to defeat by Gordon Brown at that year's election, and was succeeded by Ed Miliband as party leader several weeks before the publication of this study.

== See also ==
- Essex Man
- Swing voter
