= List of Democrats who opposed the Hillary Clinton 2016 presidential campaign =

Most Democratic Party voters supported Hillary Clinton in the 2016 United States presidential election, but some traditionally Democratic counties in the Rust Belt voted for Donald Trump. One reason given for Trump winning counties in Appalachian Ohio in the 2016 Ohio Republican primary was Democratic voters opposed to free trade who had voted in the Republican primary. In general exit polls by CNN showed Ohio Democratic voters with slightly less support for Clinton than the national average, and Trump receiving higher support among Democratic voters in Ohio than Mitt Romney had in the 2012 election.

Hillary Clinton had relatively low support in Appalachia from Democratic voters. In interviews with The Guardian, Appalachian Democrats voting for Trump cited concerns about NAFTA and coal mining. An exit poll showed Donald Trump receiving 22% of the Democratic vote in Kentucky, a state Clinton had won overwhelmingly in the 2008 presidential primary. Elliott County, Kentucky, which had the longest unbroken streak of voting Democrat of any county in the United States, went for Trump. Some Appalachian states, such as Tennessee and West Virginia, did not have exit polls.

Overall CNN exit polls indicated Clinton received 89% of the Democratic vote, compared with House Democrats receiving 92% of the Democratic vote. The difference between percentage of Republicans voting for a Republican representative and voting for Trump was six points. The Democrats who voted for Trump have been labelled "Trumpocrats".

There were also Democratic voters who favored Jill Stein. In Oregon, Stein received one percent of the Democratic vote according to CNN exit polls, equal to the total for all third-party voting among Democrats in 2012.

== Prominent Democrats who supported other candidates ==
This list also includes people who left the Democratic Party in 2016.

=== Democrats for Trump ===
- Robert Kraft, owner of the New England Patriots
- David Clarke, Sheriff of Milwaukee County
- Michael T. Flynn, (Note: Indicated support before Donald Trump's presumptive nomination on May 4.) retired three-star General, former Director of the Defense Intelligence Agency
- Tom Luken, former mayor of Cincinnati and former United States Representative
- Peter Navarro, UC Irvine Professor and 1996 Democratic nominee for California's 49th congressional district
- Richard Ojeda, West Virginia State Senator from the 7th district
- David Saunders, political strategist and author
- Andrew Stein, former Borough President of Manhattan and President of the New York City Council
- Adam Walinsky, lawyer who served in the Department of Justice and as a speechwriter for Robert F. Kennedy
- R. James Woolsey Jr., former Director of Central Intelligence

=== Democrats for Stein ===
- Cecil Bothwell, member of the Asheville, North Carolina city council (switched to Independent)
- Jimmy Dore, comedian and political commentator (switched to Independent)
- Coleen Rowley, former FBI agent and congressional candidate
- Susan Sarandon, actress

=== Others ===
- Jim Justice, Democratic nominee for governor of West Virginia
- Rocky De La Fuente, businessman and 2016 presidential candidate
- Caitlin Flanagan, writer and social critic
- Douglas Schoen, conservative analyst and Democratic political operative
- Jim Webb, former United States Senator from Virginia (2007–2013)
- Douglas Wilder, former governor of Virginia

== See also ==
- Party switching in the United States
- Democrats for Nixon
- Reagan Democrat
- Democratic and liberal support for John McCain in 2008
- List of Republicans who opposed the Donald Trump 2016 presidential campaign
- List of Democrats who opposed the Joe Biden 2024 presidential campaign
- Obama–Trump voters
- Sanders–Trump voters
