= Onward (think tank) =

Think tank established in 2018, based in the United Kingdom

Onward is a British centre-right think tank producing research on economic and social issues. It has been described as "close to Rishi Sunak's Downing Street". Onward was founded in 2018 by Will Tanner, Martyn Rose, and Neil O'Brien; its advisory board is chaired by Daniel Finkelstein. The founders state that the think tank would operate in the mainstream of conservative politics, and is a reaction to the "lack of energy on the centre right". It is explicitly aligned to the Conservative Party and is not a charity.

In October 2020, Onward stated that its advisory board also included Kate Fall, Tom Tugendhat, Kate Rock, John Lamont, James Kanagasooriam, Craig Elder, Martyn Rose, Siobhan Baillie, James O'Shaughnessy, Rupert Harrison, Richard Harrington, Anthony Browne and Claire Coutinho. In 2022, journalist Sebastian Payne became its director. In January 2025, Payne was replaced by former MP and government minister Sir Simon Clarke.

The Labour Party think tank Labour Together, associated with the party's leader, Keir Starmer, has sought to model itself on Onward.

== History ==
According to the Financial Times, Onward was launched in May 2018 at an event where the then Scottish Conservative leader Ruth Davidson and the then environment secretary Michael Gove gave speeches, and Onward's stated mission is to generate a "new wave of modernising ideas" and "a fresh kind of politics that reaches out to new groups of people".

== Publications ==
A 2019 report by Onward entitled "The Politics of Belonging" looked at the changing electoral landscape of the UK. The Times reported that "The general election will be won in the "rugby league towns" of the north of England, according to new analysis. Conservative success in attracting older white men without degrees living in such towns will determine whether the party gets a majority, the think tank Onward argues. "Workington man" will be the vital swing voter, taking the place of demographics such as "Worcester woman" and "Mondeo man" both targeted by Tony Blair's New Labour."

Onward has published a number of papers on regional disparities in economic performance. A March 2020 paper "Levelling up" argued that spending on infrastructure, culture and science was excessively skewed towards wealthier regions. The Guardian reported that, "The Treasury should stop directing so much money towards rich and productive London if it is serious about the "levelling up agenda" that Boris Johnson hopes will help him retain red wall seats, according to a report by centre-right thinktank Onward." In September 2020 the BBC reported on an Onward study which found that the UK was "one of the most geographically unbalanced developed economies" and that "in Germany 12% of people live in areas where the average income is 10% below the national average, while in the UK 35% do." The Financial Times said the study showed that "People living in seats won by the UK Conservative party in last year's general election earn on average 5 per cent less than those in areas held by the Labour opposition."

Another programme of research at the think tank has looked at social capital and community life. A March 2020 report "Repairing our social fabric", was launched with a joint article by Conservative MP Danny Kruger and Labour MP Jon Cruddas which argued that "The share of people joining local organisations, volunteering, or exchanging news or favours with those living around them is in precipitous decline. Of course, there are substitutes in new online forms of community, but the loss of face-to-face connection cannot be replaced by screen-time."
