= Labour for the Common Good =

British Labour Party pressure group

- Nickname: The Resistance
- Formation: 2015; 11 years ago
- Founder: Chuka Umunna; Tristram Hunt

Labour for the Common Good was a British pressure group within the Parliamentary Labour Party, intended to act as a resistance faction against the Labour Party leadership of Jeremy Corbyn.

== History ==
Labour for the Common Good was established in 2015 by Chuka Umunna and Tristram Hunt when, in the lead up to the 2015 Labour Party leadership election, Corbyn began pulling ahead in polling. It stated it was open to "the right to the soft left of the party", and the New Statesman stated that it aimed "to bring together the soft left, old right, Brownites and Blairites to counter the Corbynite wing." In response to its establishment, businessman John Mills stated he would "funnel" funding into Labour for the Common Good, having stated he would not fund the party itself under Corbyn. The group was seen by MPs as a direct rival to Corbyn's platform within the party, quickly gaining the nickname "the Resistance" in reference to the French Resistance. It had its first official meeting on 8 September 2015, four days before the leadership election results were held. Labour for the Common Good existed alongside other groups associated with the moderate centre-left such as Labour Together.

== Controversy ==
In 2016, Gerard Coyne was given a final written warning by Unite the Union general secretary Len McCluskey for speaking at an event held by Labour for the Common Good. The letter stated that his speech was "serious breach of trust". In 2015, Peter Hyman, the chief speechwriter and strategist for Tony Blair, said: "This is an existential moment in Labour's history. It may not survive. And it may never win again ... It is now home to two parties – one made up of Corbyn supporters and the other a centre-left party. They can't coexist. One or other will have to find a home outside Labour." By January 2016, The Guardian and The Observer were reporting a united front against a potential split of the party, with the headline "Let's stick together".
