= Workington man =

British political stereotype

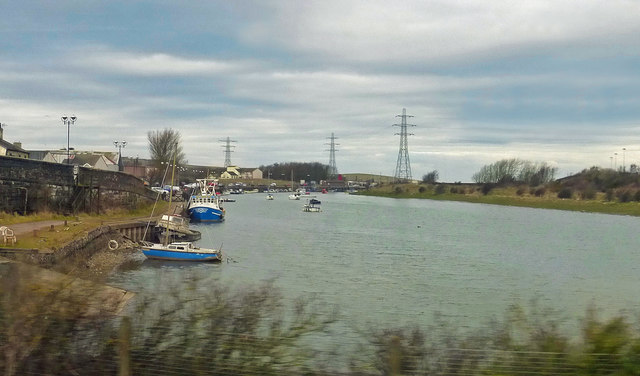
Workington Town Quay

Workington man is a political term that has been used by polling companies in the United Kingdom. Named after the Cumbria town of Workington, the term was first used ahead of the 2019 general election. Workington man describes the stereotypical swing voter who it was believed would determine the election result. Their support of the Conservatives in the 2019 election helped the party break the Labour Party's Red Wall of safe seats.

== Background ==
The term was invented by Onward, a centre-right think tank that worked on the 2019 Conservative Party campaign. In an October 2019 report entitled "The Politics of Belonging," Onward described the Workington man as:

"likely to be over 45 years old, white, does not have a degree and has lived in his home for over 10 years. He voted to Leave the EU in 2016 and thinks the country is moving away from his views both economically and culturally."

Specific values and political demands were attributed to the Workington man by the Onward report:

"The typical “Workington Man” favours security over freedom across both social and economic axes, but leans much more towards security on social issues. He wants government to prioritise apprenticeships rather than cut the cost of student loans and thinks government should promote a shared sense of national identity over a diversity of identities. Workington Man is more likely to think that crime is a major issue facing the country and twice as likely as the rest of the population to think that immigration is a major issue. He is particularly sceptical about the benefits of globalisation and thinks that we have a special responsibility to protect local institutions such as pubs and post offices from closure."

== Analysis ==
The Financial Times described the term as "just the latest depressing political caricature". The term is similar to political stereotypes used at previous elections, such as Worcester woman, who were thought to define the characteristics of a key target voter. Onward used the figure of the Workington man to draw a list of seats that the Conservatives should target in the 2019 general election, arguing that the Party should focus on "security-focused, pro-Brexit and older seats" which were held by Labour.

Labour had held the Workington constituency for most of its 100-year history, with the exception being the period following the 1976 by-election, which saw a Conservative candidate elected against a backdrop of Labour in government at national level. Less than three years after this by-election victory, the seat returned to Labour at the 1979 general election. Going into the 2019 general election, it was seen as a key marginal seat for the Conservatives to win from Labour. On a 9.7% swing, it fell to the Conservatives on election night, marking the first time the seat had elected a Conservative at a general election.

== Abolition of constituency ==
Further to the completion of the 2023 Periodic Review of Westminster constituencies, the seat was abolished. The town of Workington itself was combined with the majority of the also-abolished constituency of Copeland to form Whitehaven and Workington. The remainder, comprising the majority of the electorate, was reformed as the new seat of Penrith and Solway. In February 2023, Workington's MP Mark Jenkinson announced that he had been selected by Conservative Party members for Penrith and Solway, which was considered to be the safer seat.

== Rebuilding of the Red Wall ==
In April 2023, a Labour Together report suggested the Conservatives' vote share among 'Workington man' voters had dropped, from 49% at the 2019 general election to 15%, with Labour's vote share among the group increasing in turn to 56%, a lead of 41 points. Analysis by The Guardian said that should the level of support that Labour "currently receives from this group [be] mirrored on election day, Labour would win back every one of its 30 lost red wall seats".

== See also ==
- Essex man
- Worcester woman
- Holby City woman
- Soccer mom
- Reagan Democrat
- Obama–Trump voters
- Sanders–Trump voters
- Squeezed middle
- Stevenage woman
- Yuppie
- Motorway man
