= Waitrose woman =

British political stereotype

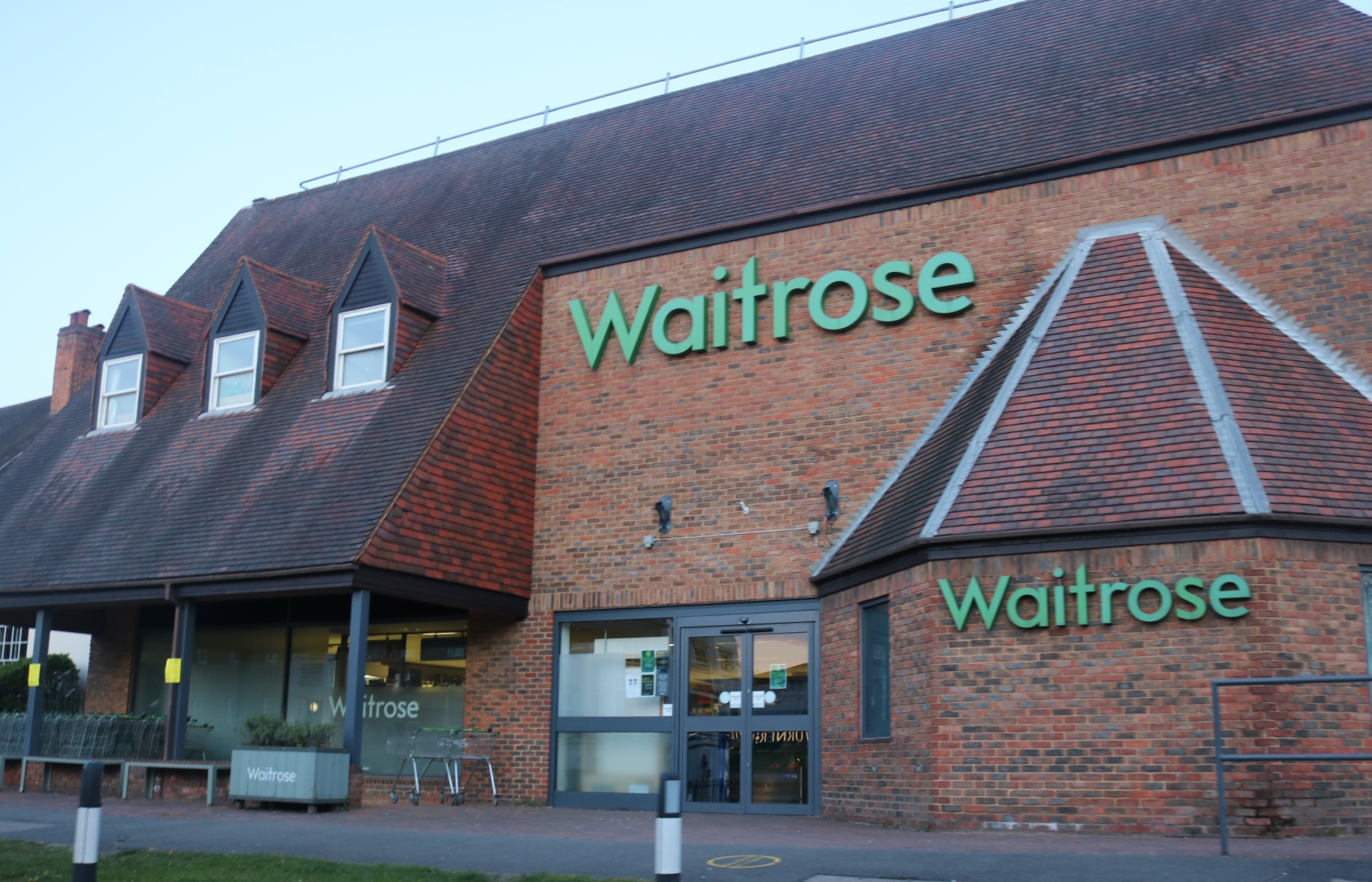
A Waitrose supermarket in Esher in Surrey, an example of where a stereotypical female voter residing in the Home counties shops.

Waitrose woman is a stereotypical voter identified in the United Kingdom ahead of the 2024 general election. It profiles a more upper middle class middle-aged woman living in the Home Counties and working in a white-collar industry, who usually voted Conservative, but is more socially liberal and dislikes culture war politics, and more likely voted Remain in the 2016 European Union referendum. The term is taken from the upmarket Waitrose supermarket chain, where she would most likely shop. Ahead of the 2024 election, Waitrose was the only supermarket chain for which shoppers were more likely to identify with the Conservatives.

== Characteristics ==
The "Waitrose woman" is a female voter in her 40s or 50s living in the Home Counties, typically university-educated, employed in a white-collar job in the City of London and has children attending secondary school. She is relatively well off and prefers low taxes, her reliance on the state is low. She is described as a "small-c conservative", likely to have voted Conservative in 2010 and 2015, supporting David Cameron, and for Remain in 2016. While she has normally voted Conservative because of family links or professional background, she has started identifying less with the party after the 2016 referendum, when the Conservatives began employing more populist/culture war politics in an attempt to appeal to pro-Brexit voters in The Midlands and Northern England. She also values national institutions, such as National Trust and the BBC, and her local environment, and is angered by the water companies and the pollution of local rivers and lakes. She has identified with the party even less following Partygate and in the 2024 election, would more likely switch to the Liberal Democrats or Labour.

== Origins ==
The term "Waitrose woman" seems to have been first coined around June 2022, after the Partygate scandal, when Conservatives lost severely in the local elections to Labour. In the Politico's London Playbook, the "Waitrose woman" was mentioned as being targeted by Prime Minister Boris Johnson as a "mythical middle-class female voter who may not have been a fan of Brexit or gone in for Johnson's populist red wall appeal, definitely doesn't look kindly upon Partygate, and might usually vote Tory but is now considering the Lib Dems.", whose votes would be fundamental to keeping him afloat. In addition, former Conservative MP David Gauke wrote in the New Statesman about the 2022 local election defeats that in the 2019 election, Conservative majorities in the "traditionally Conservative, prosperous, well-educated, generally Remain voting" Blue Wall areas in Southern England were much smaller than in 2015. In addition, he noted just a month before the 2024 election, that the Conservative proposal for a national service might not be popular with the "Waitrose woman", who would not want her teenagers subjected to that.
