= Motorway man =

Political term

"Motorway man" is a political term used by polling companies in the United Kingdom. The phrase was coined by Jim Pickard of the Financial Times in the run up to the general election of 2010 and describes a type of floating voter who it is believed can determine the outcome of an election by the way he casts his vote. The name is derived from the idea that this type of voter lives on a modern housing estate, with easy access to the motorway network.

== Description ==
The term covers male and female voters.

The Motorway Man is seen as the successor to both the Essex Man and the Mondeo Man, who respectively backed Margaret Thatcher during the 1980s and Tony Blair during the 1990s. According to an article in The Observer from February 2010, the term "Motorway man" has been used to describe "childless, youngish voters who live in modern homes close to the main motorway networks, the less environmentally attractive pockets of England where planning permission for new developments is often easier to obtain."

On 22 January 2010, the Financial Times defined Motorway man as "aspirational, materialistic and car dependent." In terms of occupation, Motorway man might be a regional sales manager, sales rep or production manager; a person who needs to be near a motorway to get around the country.

The MOSAIC database, which divides the British population into different sections, and is used by the United Kingdom's three main political parties, Labour, the Conservatives and Liberal Democrats, portrays Motorway Man as "exerting vital influence in marginal seats across southern England". 21 constituencies, located in the Midlands and North of England and adjacent to the M1, M6 and M61 were identified as marginal constituencies where "Motorway man" could influence the outcome of the general election.

Among the constituencies where "Motorway man" is thought to reside include: South Derbyshire, North West Leicestershire, Broxtowe, Loughborough, Kingswood, Warwick and Leamington, Worcester, Telford, Rugby, Nuneaton, Tamworth, Stafford, Bolton West, Chorley, West Lancashire, Milton Keynes North and Milton Keynes South.

== Characteristics ==
The typical "Motorway man" is described as follows;

- Young singles or couples, usually childless.
- Homes worth less than they paid for them.
- Live in new, purpose-built estates close to major infrastructure.
- New to managing their own domestic arrangements.
- Unfamiliar with running their finances.
- Rely on internet search engines for information about products and services, which they buy over the telephone or on the internet.
- Increasingly affected by the growth of "viral" marketing, and responsive to information sent using text messaging and direct mail.
- Live in houses with small kitchens, so are reluctant to cook. Usually eat out, buy a takeaway or heat convenience food.

== See also ==
- Essex man
- Worcester woman
- Holby City woman
- Soccer mom
- Reagan Democrat
- Squeezed middle
- Yuppie
- Workington man
- Red wall (British politics)
