= Reagan Democrat =

Democratic voters who supported Republican president Ronald Reagan

Bumper sticker from Ronald Reagan's successful 1980 presidential campaign reading "Democrats for Reagan & Bush"

A Reagan Democrat is a traditionally Democratic voter in the United States, usually working class Americans who supported Republican presidential candidates Ronald Reagan in the 1980 or the 1984 United States presidential elections or George H. W. Bush in the 1988 United States presidential election. The term remains part of the lexicon in American political jargon because of Reagan's continued widespread popularity among a large segment of the electorate.

== Overview ==
1980 bumper sticker reading, "Democrats Independents for Reagan"

During the 1980 election a dramatic number of voters in the United States, disillusioned with the economic malaise of the 1970s and the presidency of Jimmy Carter (even more than four years earlier under Republican Gerald Ford), supported Reagan, a former Democrat and California governor. Reagan's optimistic tone managed to win over a broad set of voters to an almost unprecedented degree (for a Republican since Dwight D. Eisenhower's victories in 1952 and 1956) across the board but did not make particular demographic inroads with Democratic voters, with the possible exception of national security voters (a focused yet relatively small group, difficult to find decisive empirical support for and identified in 1980 with Democrat Henry "Scoop" Jackson, a Reagan ally for a brief period after 1980 until his death in 1983).

The term Reagan Democrat is sometimes used to describe moderate Democrats who are more conservative than liberal on certain issues like national security and immigration. The term Reagan Democrat also refers to the vast sway that Reagan held over the House of Representatives during his presidency, even though the house had a Democratic majority during both of his terms. The term also hearkens back to Richard Nixon's silent majority, a concept that Reagan himself used during his political campaigns in the 1970s.

"Democrat for Reagan" bumper sticker, c. 1984

Democratic pollster Stan Greenberg issued a study of Reagan Democrats, analyzing white ethnic voters (largely unionized auto workers) in Macomb County, Michigan, just north of Detroit. The county voted 63 percent for John F. Kennedy in 1960 but 66 percent for Reagan in 1984. He concluded that Reagan Democrats no longer saw the Democratic Party as champions of their working-class aspirations but instead saw them as working primarily for the benefit of others: the very poor, feminists, the unemployed, African Americans, Latinos, and other groups. In addition, Reagan Democrats enjoyed gains during the period of economic prosperity that coincided with the Reagan administration following the malaise of the Carter administration. They also supported Reagan's strong stance on national security and opposed the 1980s Democratic Party on such issues as pornography, crime, and high taxes.

Greenberg periodically revisited the voters of Macomb County as a barometer of public opinion until he conducted a 2008 exit poll that found "nearly 60 percent" of Macomb County voters were "'comfortable' with Mr. Obama", drawing the conclusion that Macomb County had "become normal and uninteresting" and "illustrates America's evolving relationship with race". As such, Greenberg stated in an op-ed for The New York Times: "I'm finished with the Reagan Democrats of Macomb County in suburban Detroit after making a career of spotlighting their middle-class anger and frustrations about race and Democratic politicians." Obama ultimately won Macomb County by a comfortable 53–45% margin that year, the same margin he won nationally. In 2016, Macomb County voted for Donald Trump, and did so again in 2020 and 2024.

Reagan biographer Craig Shirley wrote extensively about Reagan Democrats. His 1980 election account "Rendezvous with Destiny" clearly distinguishes the appearance of blue-collar crossovers for Reagan during the 1980 Wisconsin primaries at a Reagan event in Milwaukee's "ethnic Mecca" Serb Hall. He writes: "A young Democrat, Robert Ponasik, stood on a chair furiously waving a handmade sign that proclaimed, 'Cross Over for Reagan'. Of the reaction to Reagan in Serb Hall, Lynn Sherr of ABC reported, 'In judging from the way they showed up at a long-time Democratic meeting hall ... a large number of blue-collar voters could go for Reagan.'"

== Reagan Democrats in the 1990s ==
The demographic shift that Reagan tapped into continued into the 1990s after he left office. The Democrats responded with new themes. This is evidenced by the rise of Bill Clinton to the presidency during the 1992 presidential election. In that campaign, candidate Clinton billed himself as "a different kind of Democrat", and forswore many older Democratic Party policies in favor of centrist Third Way policies that were championed by the Democratic Leadership Council in hopes of reconnecting with many working-class voters who had voted Republican in presidential campaigns since 1968—the silent majority of Nixon and the Reagan Democrats.

Many self-styled Reagan Democrats claim to be fiscal conservatives but still support many aspects of the core programs of the New Deal and the Great Society while also supporting Reagan's strong defense policies and his optimism in American culture. They still voted for Democratic politicians in the legislative and state elections until mid-1990s. Some elements of the Tea Party movement fit this sketch but many other independents and Democrats could fall into the same category as well. One of the most prominent self-styled Reagan Democrats includes the one-time Virginia Senator Jim Webb (who was in office from 2007 to 2013), whom columnist David Paul Kuhn asserts is the quintessential Reagan Democrat and one of the last of an "endangered species" within the Democratic Party.

In 2012, conservative commentator George Will, observing the long-term movements of partisanship, said: "White voters without college education—economically anxious and culturally conservative—were called 'Reagan Democrats' when they were considered only seasonal Republicans because of Ronald Reagan. Today they are called the Republican base."

== Donald Trump and Joe Biden ==
Donald Trump narrowly flipped the three Rust Belt states, which flipped from part of the blue wall in 2016 and 2024, resulting in him winning the electoral college and thus the presidency twice.

Joe Biden narrowly flipped the three Rust Belt states back into the blue wall in 2020, resulting in him winning the electoral college and thus the presidency.

The term retained relevance during and after the 2010s, as part of this group defected to Trump in the 2016 presidential election, who narrowly won every swing state in the Rust Belt and became the first Republican presidential candidate to win Pennsylvania and Michigan since George H. W. Bush in 1988 and also became first Republican presidential candidate to win Wisconsin since Ronald Reagan in 1984. Since 1980, all of these Rust Belt states always voted for the winner of the U.S. presidential election (Note: The states of Pennsylvania and Michigan voted for Republican president George H. W. Bush in 1988, but he failed to carry the state of Wisconsin.) except for Republican president George W. Bush in 2000 and 2004 in which he did not carry any three of these Rust Belt states at least once. All of these states voted for Republican president Ronald Reagan in 1980 and 1984, but voted for Democratic presidents Bill Clinton in 1992 and 1996 and Barack Obama in 2008 and 2012, as all three were once blue-leaning states, which were formerly part of the "blue wall" in the six consecutive presidential elections from 1992 to 2012. Most recently, all of these Rust Belt states became swing states and narrowly voted for Republican president Donald Trump in 2016, Democratic president Joe Biden in 2020, and again, Republican president Donald Trump in 2024.

Following the 2016 election, which saw many Rust Belt counties turn to Trump, a Republican strategist said that the working-class Reagan Democrats who favored Trump in 2016 should now be called "Trump Republicans". Conversely, it has been suggested that Reagan Democrats did not necessarily swing the Rust Belt states in 2016 but rather that Democratic voters in those regions stayed home on election day. Trump became the first Republican presidential candidate to win all three Rust Belt states of Michigan, Pennsylvania, and Wisconsin since Reagan in 1984. (Note: Ronald Reagan was the last Republican presidential candidate to win the Rust Belt state of Wisconsin in 1984.) (Note: George H. W. Bush was the last Republican presidential candidate to win the Rust Belt states of Michigan and Pennsylvania in 1988.)

In a 2021 profile with Politico, Stan Greenberg used the term "Biden Republican" to identify a large bloc of suburban white collar voters who chose Joe Biden over Trump in the 2020 presidential election. Greenberg highlighted that these voters have been reliably Republican for decades but were inclined to vote for the Democratic nominee because of the nativism of Trumpism. Following the 2024 presidential election, Trump narrowly flipped all three Rust Belt states of Michigan, Pennsylvania, and Wisconsin again. With Trump's Electoral College victories in 2016 and 2024, he became the first Republican presidential candidate to win all three Rust Belt states twice since Reagan in 1980 and 1984. (Note: George W. Bush was the only Republican presidential candidate who was able to narrowly win the electoral college and thus the presidency twice in 2000 and 2004 without carrying any of the three Rust Belt states at least once.)

== Similar concepts internationally ==
- In the United Kingdom, the term "Essex man" can be used to describe a similar group of traditionally Labour-voting working-class voters who switched to voting for the Conservative Party led by Margaret Thatcher in the 1980s thanks to her Right to Buy policy in particular. While no name in particular has been given to this group, the 2017 UK general election saw some Brexit-supporting middle or northern working-class areas swing disproportionally to the Conservative Party. For example, this was manifested in the Conservative candidates gaining part-urban Labour seats in Stoke-on-Trent, Middlesbrough, and Walsall in spite of the general Labour gain nationwide and in pro-European Union areas and the general losses for the Conservatives. On the other hand, Essex was dominated by the Conservatives in that election, with the party winning all 18 seats. After a larger number of northern working class areas swung to the Conservatives in the 2019 election, polling companies dubbed this group of people Workington man. The trend intensified in the 2019 UK general election, where the red wall largely voted for the Conservatives in greater numbers. This resulted in some constituencies that had been Labour for a century electing a Conservative MP, while others turned Conservative for the first time.
- In Australia, the term "Howard battler" was used to refer to suburban working-class and traditionally Labor voters who switched to the Liberal Party led by John Howard in the mid-1990s and carried the Liberals to victory for the first time since Malcolm Fraser in 1980.
- In New Zealand, political columnist Chris Trotter has theorised about the emergence of "Waitakere Man", a traditionally blue-collar constituency who he believes switched their votes to National Party leader John Key in 2008 on the premises of "ambition" and "aspiration", and supposedly also represent a backlash against "political correctness gone mad".

== See also ==
- Blue Labour
- Conservative Democrat
- Crossing the floor
- Crossover voting
- Democratic and liberal support for John McCain in 2008
- Democrats for Nixon
- Democrats for Trump
- The Lincoln Project
- No Labels
- Obama–Trump voters
- Sanders–Trump voters
- Party switching in the United States
- Republican and conservative support for Barack Obama in 2008
- Swing voter
