= Blue wall (British politics) =

Constituencies that typically vote Conservative

In British politics, the blue wall is a set of parliamentary constituencies in southern England which have traditionally voted for the Conservative Party, but generally opposed Brexit and are seen as being potentially vulnerable to gains either by the Liberal Democrats or the Labour Party. This shift was noticeable in the UK general elections of 2017 (when Labour gained Canterbury, which had sat a Conservative MP since 1918) and 2019 (when the Liberal Democrats gained St Albans and Labour gained Putney). In 2024, a majority of these seats fell mostly to the Liberal Democrats and some to the Labour Party.

== Overview ==
The "blue wall" is the inverse of the "red wall", a term coined in August 2019 to describe a set of constituencies in northern England, the Midlands and Wales that had long been held by Labour, and many of which were later gained by the Conservatives at the 2019 election. YouGov defines the blue wall as seats which are "currently held by the Conservatives; voted to Remain in 2016; and have a higher-than-average concentration of degree holders in the population (25%+)."

The term saw significant use following the 2021 Chesham and Amersham by-election, in which the Liberal Democrats overturned a large Conservative majority; Ed Davey, the Leader of the Liberal Democrats, knocked down a literal blue wall of bricks with an orange mallet to symbolise his party's victory. He said afterwards that he believed "the blue wall in the south can be taken by the Liberal Democrats in large numbers of constituencies." In July 2021, Davey started the process of selecting parliamentary candidates in blue wall seats and the party revealed its first candidate, for Guildford, the following month.

Starting in December 2021, with the 2021 North Shropshire by-election, the usage of this term has evolved to mean any seat which the Conservative Party has traditionally held. The evolved usage has been demonstrated by Davey describing the North Shropshire seat as being another seat falling from the blue wall.

In February 2022, think tank Onward posited that the north of England—as part of the red wall—would be "the principal battleground in the next general election" with there being "no evidence of a southern 'blue wall' ready to fall". The study found that only 20% of battleground seats at the next election would be in southern England, and in such seats the Conservatives could "gain ground". Onward's director Will Tanner said, "While the south is steadily becoming less Conservative over time, there is no blue wall waiting to fall across the Home Counties in two years' time". However, Onward did admit that certain seats "in London and the south-east are drifting away from the Tories and could fall in two or three elections' time", with data analyst James Blagden observing that "[t]he heart of the Tory party has been shifting northwards for the last 30 years" yet any potential of their "traditional southern heartlands slowly drifting away" existed in the long-term, with their "greatest short-term concern" being "backsliding in the red wall, losing their iconic 2019 gains, and putting their majority at serious risk."

A few weeks after the 2023 local elections, which saw the Conservatives lose over 1,000 seats, former Conservative minister David Gauke told The Observer that he believed the blue wall "is going to crumble", but not for some time. "The Conservative party’s got a real long-term problem in the home counties," he said. "Rishi Sunak is perfectly capable of appealing to blue wall seats, but he's the leader of a party that people have seen over quite a long period of time heading in a particular direction. Those memories are not going to disappear quickly. There's an element of 'long Boris' about it all."

Politics.co.uk has indicated "42 Blue Wells" that are vulnerable for Labour in the 2024 general election. Campaigning in the 2024 local elections, Ed Davey said he was confident of toppling the "Tory Blue Wall in Surrey".

== Blue wall constituencies ==
The following constituencies, among others, are considered part of the blue wall.

Constituency	County	% Remain in 2016 EU referendum	2015 result	2017 result	2019 result	2021–23 by-elections	2024 election	Description
Canterbury	Kent	54.7%	Con +18.4	Lab +0.3	Lab +3.1		Lab +18.4	Held by the Conservatives from 1918 to 2017.
Chesham and Amersham	Buckinghamshire	55.0%	Con +45.4	Con +40.1	Con +29.1	LD +21.2	LD +10.0	Held by the Conservatives from 1974 to 2021.
Chipping Barnet	Greater London	59.1%	Con +14.5	Con +0.6	Con +2.1		Lab +5.7	Held by the Conservatives from its creation in 1974 to 2024.
Cities of London and Westminster	Greater London	71.4%	Con +26.7	Con +8.2	Con +9.3		Lab +6.9	Held by the Conservatives from its creation in 1950 to 2024.
Esher and Walton	Surrey	58.4%	Con +50.2	Con +38.9	Con +4.4		LD +22.3	Held by the Conservatives from its creation in 1997 to 2024.
Guildford	Surrey	58.9%	Con +41.6	Con +30.7	Con +5.7		LD +17.5	Held by the Conservatives from 1910 to 2001 and from 2005 to 2024.
Hitchin and Harpenden	Hertfordshire	60.3%	Con +36.3	Con +20.5	Con +11.7		Lab +11.7	Held by the Conservatives from its creation in 1997 to 2024.
North Shropshire	Shropshire	40.2%	Con +31.6	Con +29.4	Con +40.6	LD +15.6	LD +30.9	Held by the Conservatives from 1832 to 2021 (other than from 1904 to 1906). (Note: North Shropshire was known as Oswestry from 1885 to 1983)
Putney	Greater London	73.2%	Con +23.8	Con +3.3	Lab +9.4		Lab +25.3	Held by the Conservatives from 2005 to 2019.
Somerton and Frome	Somerset	46.7%	Con +33.6	Con +35.8	Con +29.6	LD +21.2	LD +28.4	Held by the Conservatives from 2015 to 2023.
South Cambridgeshire	Cambridgeshire	61.6%	Con +33.5	Con +24.6	Con +4.3		LD +19.4	Held by the Conservatives from its creation in 1997 to 2024.
South West Surrey	Surrey	59.4%	Con +50.0	Con +35.7	Con +14.6			Held by the Conservatives since its creation in 1983. Abolished at the 2024 General Election and replaced largely by Godalming and Ash, which stayed Conservative.
St Albans	Hertfordshire	62.6%	Con +23.3	Con +10.7	LD +10.9		LD +38.4	Held by the Conservatives from 2005 to 2019.
Tiverton and Honiton	Devon	42.2%	Con +37.5	Con +34.3	Con +40.7	LD +14.4	LD +14.4	Held by the Conservatives from 1997 to 2022.
Wimbledon	Greater London	70.6%	Con +26.1	Con +10.9	Con +1.2		LD +22.9	Held by the Conservatives from 2005 to 2024.
Wokingham	Berkshire	57.6%	Con +43.2	Con +31.5	Con +11.9		LD +15.5	Held by the Conservatives from its creation in 1950 to 2024.
Wycombe	Buckinghamshire	52.0%	Con +28.9	Con +12.3	Con +7.7		Lab +10.3	Held by the Conservatives from 1951 to 2024.

== Criticism of the term ==
Just like "red wall", the concept of a blue wall has been criticised as a generalisation. James Blagden, Chief Data Analyst at the think tank Onward, said, in 2022, that there was no evidence of a blue wall in Southern England that mirrored Labour's red wall.

If a Blue Wall existed anywhere, it was London in the 1990s. The Conservatives polled better in London than they did nationally at every election between 1979 and 1992. But there was a 'correction waiting to happen'. Using regression analysis, we show that the Conservatives over-performed demographic predictions in 49 out of their 60 London seats in 1987. Only 11 of these remained after Tony Blair swept to victory ten years later. The pendulum swung hard against the Conservatives and has never returned. So much so that the Conservatives have never held a smaller share of London seats, while being in Government, than they do now.

== See also ==
- Blue wall (United States)
- Red wall (British politics)
- Sea wall (British politics)
- Teal independents
