= Middle England =

Conservative middle classes in England

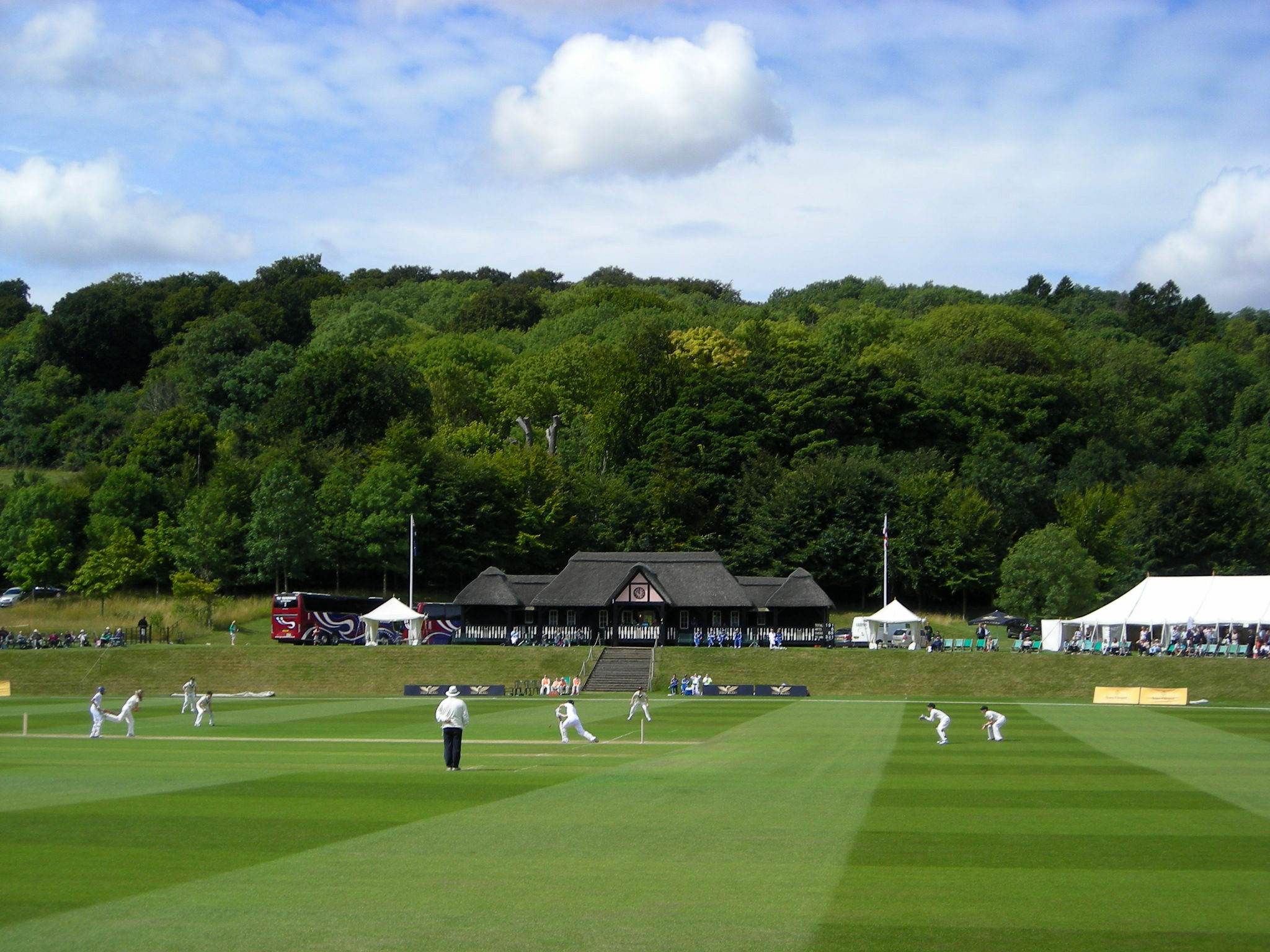
Typically English activities such as village cricket matches popularly evoke an image of Middle England

The phrase "Middle England" is a socio-political term which generally refers to middle class or lower middle class people in England who hold traditional conservative or right-wing views.

== Origins ==
The origins of the term "Middle England" are not known. Writer Ian Hislop found evidence of the British Prime Minister Lord Salisbury's using the term in 1882, but it did not gain popularity at the time. Modern popular usage of the phrase has been attributed to Margaret Thatcher who, according to the historian David Cannadine, introduced the expression into political phraseology by adopting Richard Nixon's concept of "Middle America". However, Joe Moran found that, although the concept originated in Thatcherism, the term itself was rarely used by Thatcher, or by national newspapers until the 1990s premiership of John Major.

== Modern usage ==
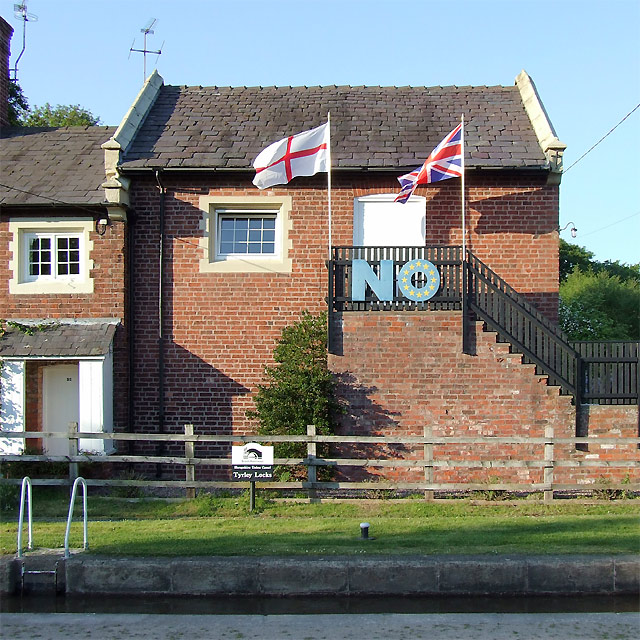
Middle England's political opinions, such as Euroscepticism, are considered highly influential

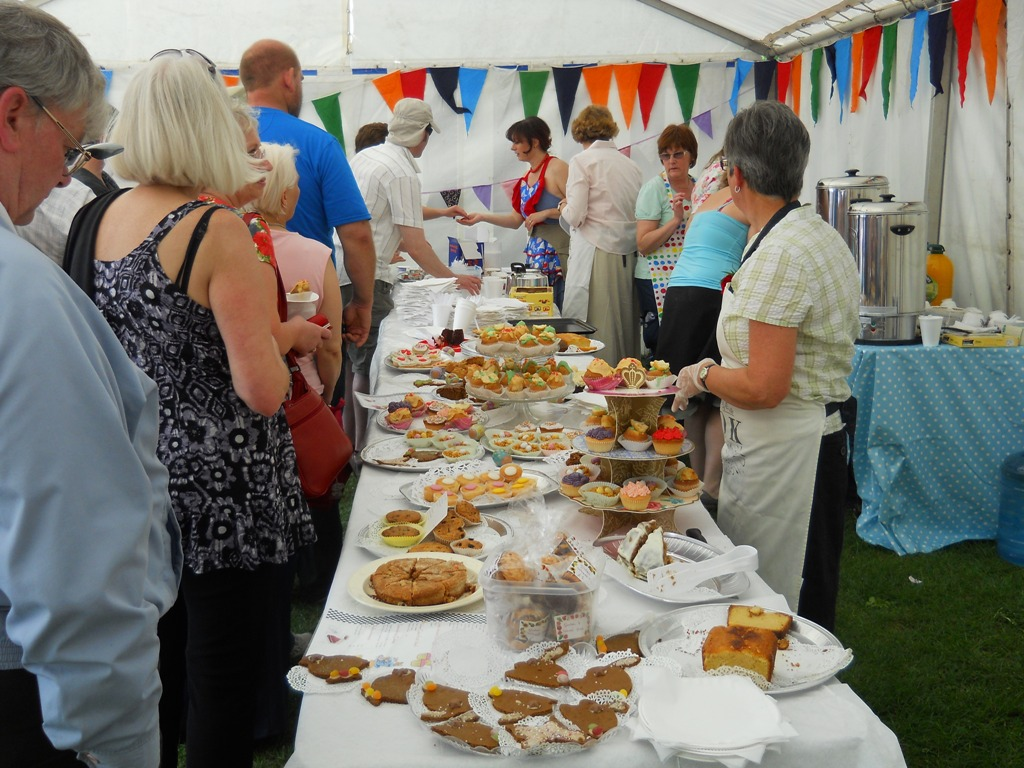
The Women's Institute is strongly associated with the concept of Middle England

The primary meaning of the term is now a political or sociological one (as is also the case for the term "Middle America" or "Middle Australia"). It principally indicates the middle classes or lower-middle classes of non-urban Britain, but also carries connotations of "Deep England". John Major's 1993 speech to the Conservative Group for Europe is often cited, evoking romantic imagery of rural cricket matches, warm beer, suburban gardens, and "old maids bicycling to Holy Communion through the morning mist" (itself based on a quote from George Orwell).

Although Middle England does not refer to a geographical region, it may be understood to refer to the inhabitants of suburbs in the South of England and the Midlands, typified by the small towns that make up "Metro-Land", the suburban areas north-west of London that are served by London Underground's Metropolitan line. The BBC described the Kent town of Tunbridge Wells as the "spiritual home" of Middle England, with particular reference to the popular characterisation of "Disgusted of Tunbridge Wells", the pseudonym of an imaginary, incensed letter-writer. Emphasising its lack of geographical location, the writer Nick Inman likened Middle England to J. R. R. Tolkien's Middle-earth: "We know everything about it except where it is".

The term is used by journalists to refer to the presumed views of mainstream English and to a lesser extent British people, as opposed to minorities of all types (the rich or the poor, ethnic minorities, gays, lesbians and bisexuals, the politically active, the intelligentsia, etc.). In particular, it is increasingly used to denote the more right-wing views of those who are not in such minorities. The phrase "Middle England" may be regarded by some as interchangeable with "Middle Britain", particularly with reference to political campaigns that seek to include middle-class voters in Scotland and Wales, but commentators such as Cannadine have assessed it as a designation specific to a segment of England, not Britain as a whole. John Major's 1993 speech has been noted for its culturally selective evocation of Britain, omitting inner cities, football, people who are unemployed, coal mines, Muslims, and the other Constituent Countries of the United Kingdom.

People who belong to the Middle England grouping are typically said to be white, middle class or lower-middle class, heterosexual, with a strong work ethic and a highly developed sense of conscientiousness. They may typically read the Daily Mail, a popular British newspaper known for its conservative editorial bias, and are also sometimes referred to as the "silent majority" or "moral majority" in the British media.

== In politics ==
In British politics, Middle England is considered as a grouping to be especially important because of its potential to swing the results of United Kingdom general elections; according to the polling company MORI, Middle England is said to make up 25% of the UK population, its members are not devoted to any particular party and may be swayed by successful political campaigning, and many live in marginal constituencies. Middle England was also considered to be a major force in the vote to leave the European Union during the 2016 European Union membership referendum. Following the 2025 United Kingdom local elections, the Leader of the Liberal Democrats, Sir Ed Davey, said he believes his party is shaping up to be "the new party of middle England", replacing the Conservative Party.

== Other institutions ==
Members of the Countryside Alliance may be considered to be typical of Middle England, while members of the Women's Institute have been described as "the backbone of Middle England".

== Related terms ==
Other demographic personas associated with Middle England include "Mondeo Man" (a term attributed to Tony Blair which describes a middle-class floating voter who owns a Ford Mondeo); "Worcester woman" (a provincial voter with little actual political awareness); "Essex Man" (an aspirational lower-middle-class voter from Essex); and "Pebbledash people" (a term coined by ICM Research to describe married white collar couples who live in semi-detached houses covered in pebbledash).

== See also ==
- Merry England
- Little Englander
- Demographics of England
- Social structure of the United Kingdom
- Middle America

== Sources ==
- Moran, Joe (April 2005). "The Strange Birth of Middle England" (PDF). The Political Quarterly. 76 (2): 232–240. doi:10.1111/j.1467-923X.2005.00675.x – via academia.edu.
