= Holby City woman =

Voter demographic

Holby City woman (HCW) was a voter demographic which was identified by Conservative Party strategists in the United Kingdom as a key group of voters for the Conservative Party at the 2010 general election. The term is taken from the fictional BBC hospital drama Holby City, set in South West England. The character of Faye Morton (played by actress Patsy Kensit) has been described as an example of a typical "Holby City woman".

== Characteristics ==
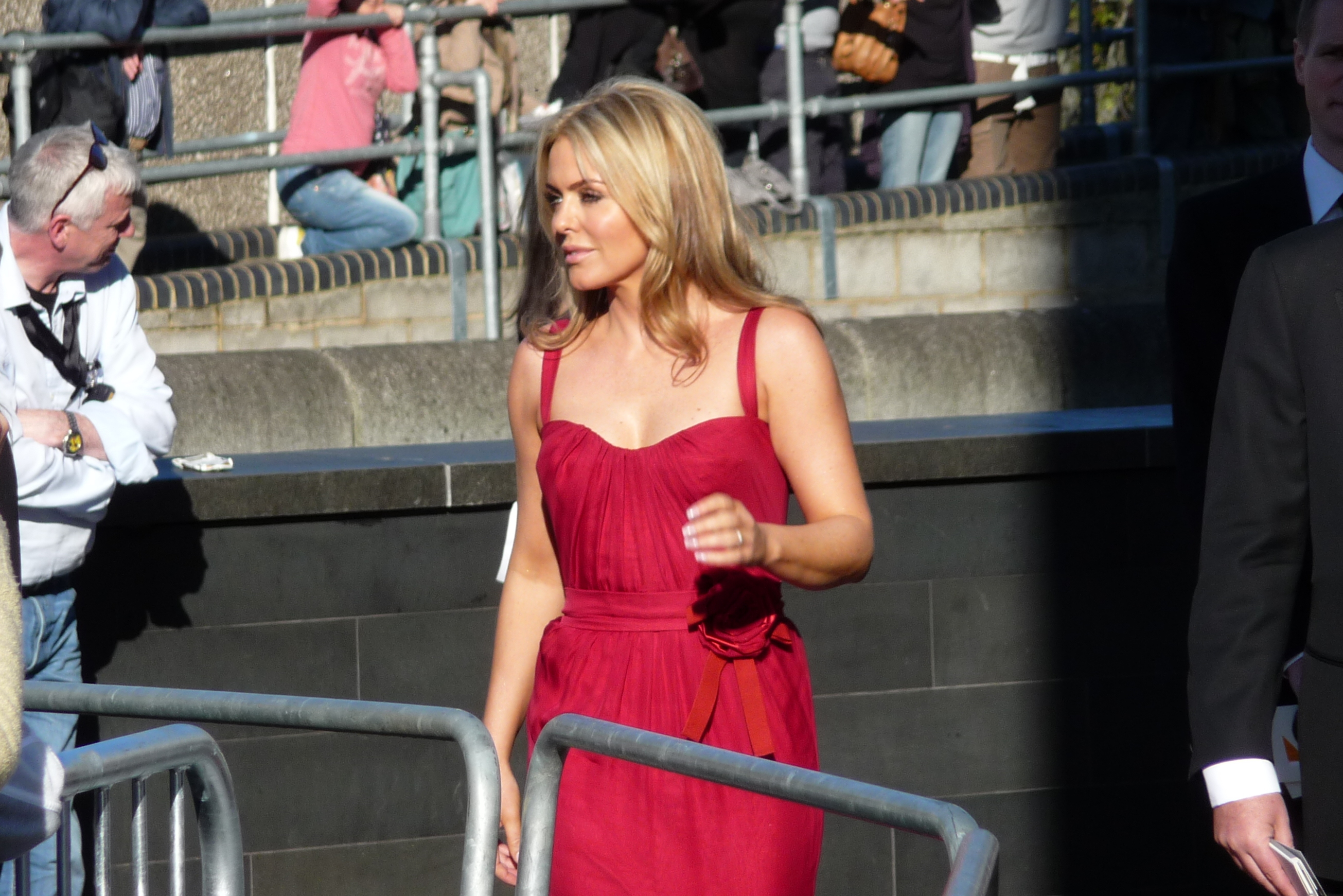
The character of Faye Morton, as portrayed by actress Patsy Kensit, is the "typical Holby City woman"

The "Holby City woman" is a female voter in her 30s or 40s, employed in a clinical or clerical position or some other public sector job. She is a swing voter in General Elections. Key issues for such a voter include: education, the state of the National Health Service, care for the elderly and childcare. A "Holby City woman" has voted for the Labour Party in previous elections but her identification with the Labour Party is not strong. Such a voter is likely to be in charge of family finances and is therefore accepting of public sector cuts during a recession. Conservative strategists believe that the Damian McBride controversy and the alleged "macho" culture surrounding the Prime Minister will turn such voters against the Labour Party. Occupations for HCW include nurses, administrators and teachers. "Holby City Women" earn less than £30,000 per annum.

== Analysis ==
The Times columnist David Aaronovitch has argued that the Conservative Party may struggle to win over "Holby Women". The Health Policy Insight argue that policies aimed to appeal to "Holby Women" such as ring-fencing health spending appeal more to left-minded voters rather than right-wing voters.

== Similar terms ==
The term has been compared to “Worcester woman” — Middle England voters who were seen as key to the success of New Labour under the leadership of Tony Blair.

== See also ==
- Essex man (also called "Mondeo Man") - Targeted by the Conservatives in 1992
- Worcester woman - Targeted by Labour in 1997
- Motorway man - a type of floating voter targeted at the 2010 general election
- Stevenage woman - a type of floating voter targeted at the 2024 general election
- Workington man - Targeted by the Conservatives in 2019
- Soccer mom - A term used in the United States, particularly during the 1996 presidential campaign
