= Red wall (British politics) =

Term for a group of constituencies

The results of the 2017 and 2019 general elections, showing blocks of Labour support (in red) in the West Midlands, Lancashire, South Yorkshire, West Yorkshire, and North East England

Map (in equal-size constituencies) of the 2017 general election results showing the red wall

The red wall is a term used in British politics to describe the UK Parliament constituencies in the Midlands and Northern England that have historically supported the Labour Party. The term was coined by the pollster James Kanagasooriam in a 2019 article for the Financial Times. At the 2019 general election, many of these parliamentary seats were won by the Conservative Party, with the media describing the red wall as having "turned blue".

At the 2021 Hartlepool by-election, the Conservatives won for the first time in decades in another red wall seat. The 2021 Batley and Spen by-election was also for a red wall seat; Labour held the seat, albeit with a reduced majority. In the 2022 Wakefield by-election, Labour regained their first red wall seat; this was also their first gain in any by-election since 2012. At the 2024 general election, Labour regained almost all of these seats, with the media describing the red wall as having been "rebuilt".

== Background ==
Historically, the working class-dominated constituencies in the North Midlands and Northern England tended to favour the Labour Party. As early as the 1906 general election, two-thirds of Labour candidates elected came from Northern English constituencies. In 2014, political scientists Robert Ford and Matthew Goodwin documented the erosion by the UK Independence Party (UKIP) of the Labour-supporting working-class vote in their book Revolt on the Right.

At the 2017 general election, the Conservatives lost seats overall but gained six Labour-held seats in the Midlands and North, which Labour had held for at least three decades: North East Derbyshire, Walsall North, Mansfield, Stoke-on-Trent South, Middlesbrough South and East Cleveland, and Copeland (held from the 2017 Copeland by-election). In 2019, the Conservatives increased their majority in the seats previously gained. Former Brexit Party leader Nigel Farage suggested prior support of many northern Labour voters for UKIP, which he had also led, and the Brexit Party made it easier for them to vote Conservative.

== 2019 general election results ==
Constituencies gained in the 2019 general election (Conservative gains in blue). Animated version available here.

In the 2019 United Kingdom general election the Conservative Party had a net gain of 48 seats in England. The Labour Party had a net loss of 47 seats in England, losing approximately 20% of its 2017 general election support in red wall seats. Labour lost in the election 36 seats that voted for Brexit, and Conservatives leader and then-prime minister Boris Johnson's primary campaign pledge was to swiftly act on withdrawal from the European Union.

Voters in seats like Bolsover, and swing voters of the type thought to be typified by Workington man, cited Brexit and the leadership of Jeremy Corbyn as reasons why they chose not to vote Labour. The party lost so much support in the red wall in some seats, such as Sedgefield, Ashfield, and Workington, that even without the Tory vote share increase, the Conservatives would still have gained those seats.

=== Notable examples of red wall constituencies taken by the Conservatives ===
Constituency	County	% Leave in 2016 EU referendum	Description	Ref.	2024 Result
Ashfield	Nottinghamshire	70.5%	Held by Labour since 1955, except for a brief Conservative by-election victory in 1977–79. It was won by Gloria De Piero in 2010 with a majority of 192 votes for Labour. She stood down in 2019, and her former office manager Lee Anderson took the seat after defecting to the Conservatives. Labour finished third behind local independent Jason Zadrozny, who also stood on a Eurosceptic platform.		Reform UK gain
Bassetlaw	Nottinghamshire	68.3%	Held by Labour since 1935. The Conservatives won more than half of the vote share, with a Labour to Conservative swing of 18.4%, the largest in the country, and a majority of over 14,000 votes for the new MP.		Labour regain
Bishop Auckland	County Durham	60.6%	Held by Labour at every UK general election except one since 1918, though its majority decreased in every election from 2001 to 2017, by which time it had been reduced to just 502 votes. Returned a Conservative MP for the first time in its 134-year history, with a majority of 7,962.		Labour regain
Blyth Valley	Northumberland	59.8%	Held by Labour at every election except one since creation in 1950. The constituency declaration, shortly after 11:30pm, was the election's first flip and regarded as an early sign of the electoral trend.		abolished Labour gained new seats
Bolsover	Derbyshire	70.2%	Held by Labour since its creation in 1950. 87-year old Socialist Campaign Group stalwart Dennis Skinner was defeated, having held the seat for 49 years (since 1970).		Labour regain
Don Valley	South Yorkshire	68.5%	Held by Labour since 1922. Caroline Flint, previously a Labour minister and Leave supporter, was defeated having served since 1997.		abolished Labour gained new seats
Dudley North	West Midlands	71.4%	Held by Labour since creation in 1997 (predecessor seats since 1970). Won by a majority of 11,533 on a Labour to Conservative swing of 15.8%. Retiring Labour MP was Ian Austin who became Independent and encouraged people to vote Conservative.		Labour gain new seat
Heywood and Middleton	Greater Manchester	62.4%	Held by Labour since its creation in 1983. It was almost lost to UKIP at a 2014 by-election in which Labour retained the seat by just 617 votes, but Labour majorities had recovered in 2015 and 2017 to over 5,000 and 7,000, respectively. By-elections usually have significantly lower levels of voter turnout compared to ordinary general elections in the UK.		Labour regain
Leigh	Greater Manchester	63.4%	Held by Labour since 1922. Formerly the seat of Andy Burnham from 2001 to 2017 when he became Mayor of Greater Manchester.		Labour gain new seat
Sedgefield	County Durham	58.9%	Held by Labour since 1935 (although the seat was abolished 1974–1983). Formerly the seat of Prime Minister Tony Blair from his first election to the Commons in 1983 until his resignation from Parliament in June 2007.		Labour gain new seat
Wakefield	West Yorkshire	62.6%	Held by Labour since a by-election in 1932, although the majority in 1983 was only 360 votes, and since 2010 had been marginal. The incumbent MP Mary Creagh was a prominent opponent of Brexit. Creagh confronted Labour Party leader Jeremy Corbyn in Parliament five days after the election.		Regained in 2022 by-election
Workington	Cumbria	60.3%	Held by Labour at every election except one since creation in 1918. "Workington man" was a profile seen as typical of northern, older, male, working-class voters who watch rugby league. Won by Mark Jenkinson, previously a candidate in Workington for UKIP, with a majority of 4,176.		Labour gains replacement seats

== 2024 general election results ==
Results of the 2024 general election, which saw Labour regain a large number of 'Red Wall' seats

Runners up in each constituency in the 2024 General Election; Reform UK came second in a number of 'Red Wall' seats

At the 2024 general election, Labour regained 34 of the 36 Brexit-voting seats it lost in 2019. The Conservatives held on in Keighley and Ilkley and Stockton West. Labour only increased its vote share from about 38% to 41%, however; the Conservative share decreased from about 47% to 24%, while Reform UK received about 22%.

== Labour parliamentary caucus ==
In November 2024, a few dozen Labour MPs formed the 'Red Wall Caucus' to push the government to be more vocal on immigration and stop Reform UK gaining in their constituencies. The group is led by Jo White. The group is reported to be working with Labour Together, the think tank.

One month later, PoliticsHome reported the caucus had 30 MPs; the BBC reported this was around 40 in February 2025.

== Criticism of the term ==
=== Generalisation ===
The red wall metaphor has been criticised as a generalisation. In the aftermath of the 2019 general election, author and Newcastle University lecturer Alex Niven said that it was "a convenient term of journalese that seemed to arise in the last days of the 2019 campaign to describe a large, disparate part of the country north of Oxford." Lewis Baston called it "a mythical wall" and "a way of making a patronising generalisation about a huge swathe of England (and a corner of Wales)". He argued that the red wall is politically diverse, and includes bellwether seats that swung with the national trend, as well as former mining and industrial seats that show a more unusual shift.

In July 2020, Rosie Lockwood from the Institute for Public Policy Research said: "For years the Westminster establishment has sought to define the north through soundbites. The most recent is 'the red wall'." In an article for The Daily Telegraph that same month, Royston Smith, member of Parliament for Southampton Itchen, made the case that his seat in post-industrial Southampton was one of the first red wall seats gained from the Labour Party when he became its Conservative MP at the 2015 general election.

In July 2021, following Labour's narrow victory in the Batley and Spen by-election, David Edgerton, professor of Modern British History at King's College London, denounced the concept of the red wall and pointed out that "the belief that working-class people traditionally voted Labour has only been true (and barely so) for a mere 25 years of British history, and a long time ago." He went on to say:

"The phenomenon of a working-class red wall is an ideological concoction that benefits Labour's enemies. It makes little sociological or psephological sense today, and the fragment of the past it reflects is one of Tory working classes. Yet this group has come to define how Labour thinks of the working class. That the party views this Tory analysis as a bellwether of its fortunes speaks to its collapse as an independent, transformative political force. If it is ever to win significant support today among real English people, Labour needs to understand its own history, celebrate its successes and love itself, its members and its voters.

Labour undoubtedly still needs the working-class vote. Winning this means creating a Labour party for workers and trade unionists in the present day, not those of a mythologised past. Doing better among those workers than Labour did in its heyday would also be necessary for electoral success. The party needs to relearn not only how to get votes, but how to keep them too, which it has failed to do for decades. To make all this possible it needs to present a real alternative with vigour and confidence, and to stop acting as if it believed that this uniquely dangerous Conservative government had the British past, present and future in its bones."

=== Demographics ===
In January 2022, Anthony Wells, director of Political Research at YouGov, wrote an article titled "Stop obsessing about the Red Wall". In it, he criticised political commentators and politicians who use the term "based upon a perception of what the author's idea of a stereotypical working class Conservative voter would think, rather missing the point of James [Kanagasooriam]'s original hypothesis that voters in those areas were actually demographically similar to more Tory areas ... [T]hese were seats that for cultural reasons were less Conservative than you would have expected given their demographics. To some degree that has unwound in some areas. There is probably not an easy way for Labour to rebuild that reluctance to consider voting Tory in places where it has collapsed. It is also worth considering whether it has even fully played out... it may be there is further realignment to go."

=== Class and social issues ===
Newcastle University geography professor Danny MacKinnon said that the weakening relationship between Labour and red wall voters can be traced back to the late 1990s, when New Labour aimed for middle-class support. He said that "Labour became more of a middle-class party. [Red wall areas] have older voters who have had lower living standards since 2010. There's the phrase 'left behind'. And there's a sense of cultural alienation from Labour and metropolitan cities."

David Jeffery, a lecturer in British Politics at the University of Liverpool, stated that "the Conservative party's new supporters aren't really that different from their old ones". Using data from the British Election Study, he analysed the attitudes between voters within and without the red wall and found that "[t]he differences between Red Wall and non-Red Wall voters (and switchers) is marginal across all three topics, suggesting [that] 'going woke' isn't a unique threat to the party's new electoral coalition any more than it is to their voter base in general."

In May 2021, YouGov released the results of a large survey that "somewhat contradicts 'evidence' from vox-pops and commentary on the underlying reasons for voters moving away from Labour in these constituencies." Patrick English wrote:

"Our survey shows that rather than being a bastion of social conservativism within Britain, these constituencies up and down the North and Midlands contain a great diversity of opinions, and indeed widespread support for a range of what we might consider progressive policies and views.

Furthermore, where Red Wall voters do exhibit socially conservative attitudes, they are not significant stronger (or no more common) than the level of social conservativism which we see among the British public in general.

In other words, the Red Wall is no more socially conservative than Britain as a whole, and characterisation of voters in these areas as predominantly 'small c' conservatives concerned about social liberalisation or culture wars is not supported by polling evidence."

Responding to this survey, Jeremy Corbyn's former senior policy adviser Andrew Fisher insisted that the concept of the "mythologised Red Wall" was "part of a decades-long agenda aimed at undermining progressive causes."

=== Ethnic minority voters ===
In Tribune, Jason Okundaye warned Labour not to forget about its "other heartlands", namely Black and South Asian voters in urban areas. He said that during the New Labour years, "Labour felt it could ignore the concerns of working-class voters because they were assumed to be pious followers of the Labour religion. Peter Mandelson's belief that they had 'nowhere else to go' became a creedal statement. What it failed to see was a class of increasing political atheists. It is not hard to imagine the same thing happening in future to ethnic minority communities."

== Other similar terms ==
=== Blue wall ===
The "blue wall" is a set of parliamentary constituencies in southern England which have traditionally voted for the Conservative Party, but generally opposed Brexit and are seen as being potentially vulnerable to gains either by the Liberal Democrats or the Labour Party. It is made up of counties like Kent, Surrey and Sussex. The name "blue wall" was coined as an analogy with the concept of the Labour "red wall".

=== Tartan wall ===
The tartan wall refers to the Labour-voting areas in the formerly industrial Central Belt in Scotland, which slowly progressed towards voting for the Scottish National Party (SNP) in the 2015 United Kingdom general election in Scotland. This resulted in the borderline extinction of Scottish Labour MPs, as only Ian Murray (Edinburgh South) retained his seat whilst 40 other constituencies were won by the SNP.

Although these seats did not fall to the Scottish Conservatives in the 2019 United Kingdom general election in Scotland and thus are not commonly included in the category of the red wall, it has been argued that much of the same disillusionment felt in the parts of England and Wales that resulted in the loss of those seats in 2019 was also present in 2015 in Scotland. Perhaps a predictor for the now red wall seats in England, Labour's decline in Scotland has largely been seen as ongoing, as even though they saw a small revival in the 2017 United Kingdom general election in Scotland, where they won seven seats, this was seen as part the national trend towards Labour, as well as lower turnout among SNP voters; in the 2019 election, the party lost six of its seats, again reducing it to one MP. All these seats fell back to Scottish Labour at the 2024 general election.

=== Yellow halo ===
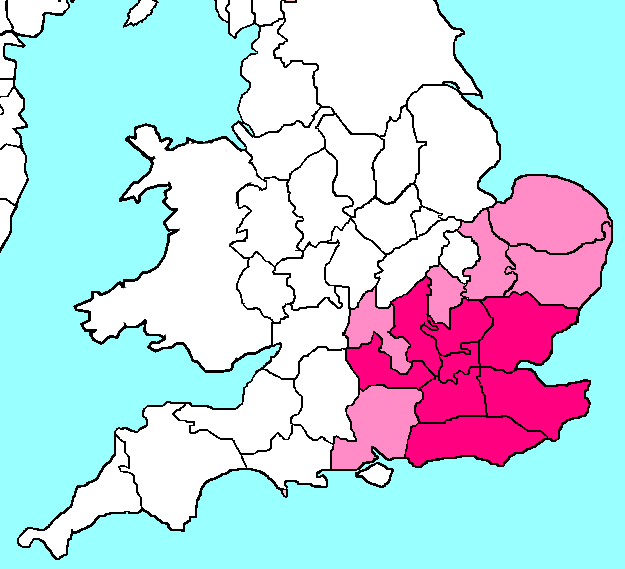
Some parts of the Home counties were identified as constituting the yellow halo

In 2020, a yellow halo of Liberal Democrat targets was identified, including south-west London and eastern Surrey, Oxfordshire, Hampshire and Cambridgeshire, corresponding in part to the Home Counties. This included held the held seats of Ed Davey in Kingston and Surbiton and Layla Moran in Oxford West and Abingdon, as well as targets such as Esher and Walton, Guildford, Wantage, Winchester and Woking, all of which were held or gained by the Liberal Democrats in 2024. Alongside several other by-election wins, the Liberal Democrats won the 2021 Chesham and Amersham by-election, which constituted part of the halo. In the 2024 general election, the Liberal Democrats gained a large number of seats in the South West and South East, including all but two seats in Oxfordshire.

=== Red belt ===
Within the context of the 2020 Emilia-Romagna regional election, as the Italian region of Emilia-Romagna was put under comparable pressure by Matteo Salvini and the League for the first time in the history of the Italian Republic, journalist Nicholas Burgess Farrell described Italy's historical red belt as its red wall equivalent. Citing the examples of Salvini and then Prime Minister Boris Johnson, he argued that right-wing populists in Britain and Italy were making inroads within their respective country's most left-leaning regions.

== See also ==
- Workington man
- Blue wall (British politics)
- Blue wall (United States)
- Sea wall (British politics)
- Red wall (Canada)
- Essex man
- Ceinture rouge
- Red Belt (Russia)
- Obama–Trump voters
- Reagan Democrat
- Sanders–Trump voters
- Solid North
