= Worcester woman =

UK electoral stereotype

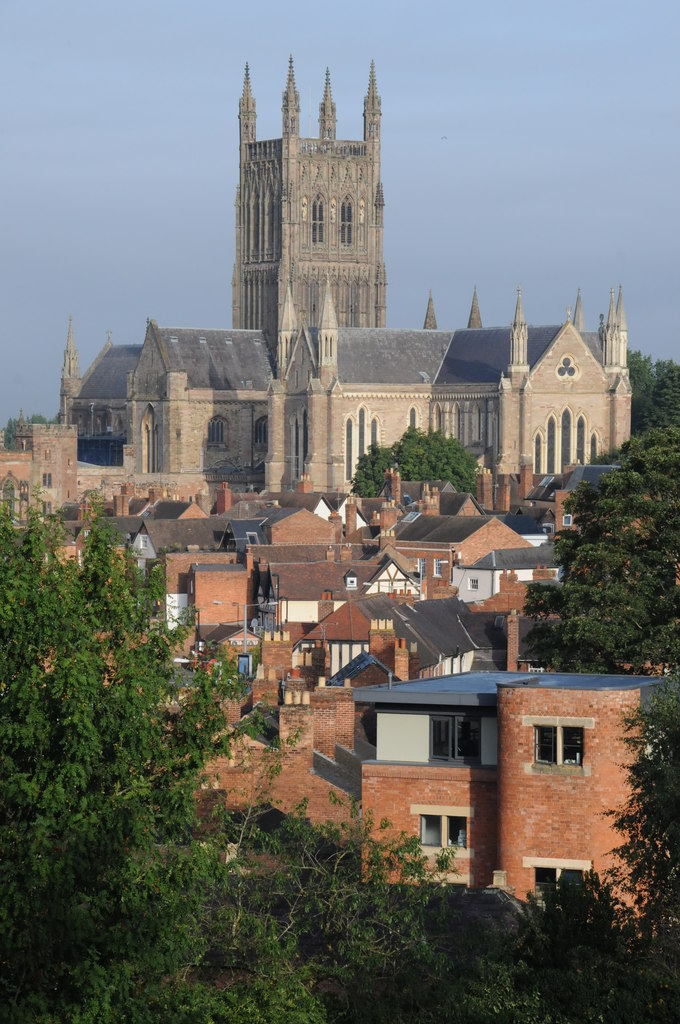
The historic city of Worcester

Worcester woman is a political term used by polling companies in the United Kingdom. It profiles or describes a type of median voter, a working class woman in her 30s with two children who worries about quality of life issues and has little interest in politics. Not necessarily hailing from the West Midlands city of Worcester, Worcester woman has been described as an important swing voter when it comes to deciding elections.

It has been perceived to represent someone who would previously have voted Conservative but would likely be swung to vote for Tony Blair's Labour Party by the New Labour rebranding. This electoral sector was particularly targeted in the 1997 and 2001 UK general elections. The Worcester constituency is a noted marginal seat which elected its first ever Labour MP in 1997. It subsequently returned to the Conservatives in 2010. In 2015, it was considered a swing voter for Ed Miliband.

Worcester woman has also been used as a pejorative term to describe a woman with consumerist views and a shallow interest in politics, leading her to decide her vote based on issues raised during the election campaign, and therefore likely to vote for whichever political party has the most effective spin.

== See also ==
- Bellwether
- Essex man
- Holby City woman
- Person having ordinary skill in the art
- Placeholder name
- Politics of the United Kingdom
- Price of milk question
- Middle England
- Motorway man
- Soccer mom
- Stevenage woman
- Workington man
