= Essex man =

British political stereotype

Essex man and Mondeo man are stereotypical figures which were popularised in 1990s Britain. The "Essex man" as a political figure is an example of a type of median voter and was used to help explain the electoral successes of Conservative Prime Minister Margaret Thatcher in the 1980s. The closely related "Mondeo man" was identified as the sort of voter the Labour Party needed to attract to win the election in 1997. Basildon man and woman are narrower terms being used synonymously.

== Background ==
Although the Labour Party was traditionally considered the "natural choice" for the working class, there has traditionally been a group within that class who have voted Conservative, who are distinct from the "Essex man" phenomenon. Following the Second World War, there was considerable social change in South East England. Working-class English families were encouraged to leave the war-damaged slums in inner London and move to newly built council-owned properties in the suburbs and new towns in the home counties, including Basildon and Harlow in Essex. With the decline of manufacturing and skilled manual work in the 1980s, this group increasingly looked to middle class professions for employment, or became self-employed.

Their children enjoyed housing, education and employment opportunities far removed from the experiences of their parents.

== Essex man and Thatcherism ==
Margaret Thatcher's policies during her tenure in office from 1979–90 included: lower taxation, control of inflation and sale of council houses at subsidised prices. These policies (in particular, the right to buy scheme) are thought to have caused many people who had traditionally voted Labour in Essex to switch their allegiance in the elections of 1979, 1983 and 1987.

The Oxford English Dictionary (OED) lists the earliest reference to the Essex man as one from 7 October 1990, in an anonymous article penned by Simon Heffer for The Sunday Telegraph. However, the 26 January 1990 issue of Campaign has the following reference: "Representative [David Amess] of new Essex man, working class, father electrician, right wing, keen hanger, noisily rambunctious, no subtlety". Sky UK minidishes on newly purchased council houses were, according to Heffer, symbols of Essex man's pride in his prosperity. Owing to the similarities between the politics of Thatcher's UK and Ronald Reagan's US, the contemporary term Reagan Democrat is roughly analogous to Essex man.

== Mondeo man ==
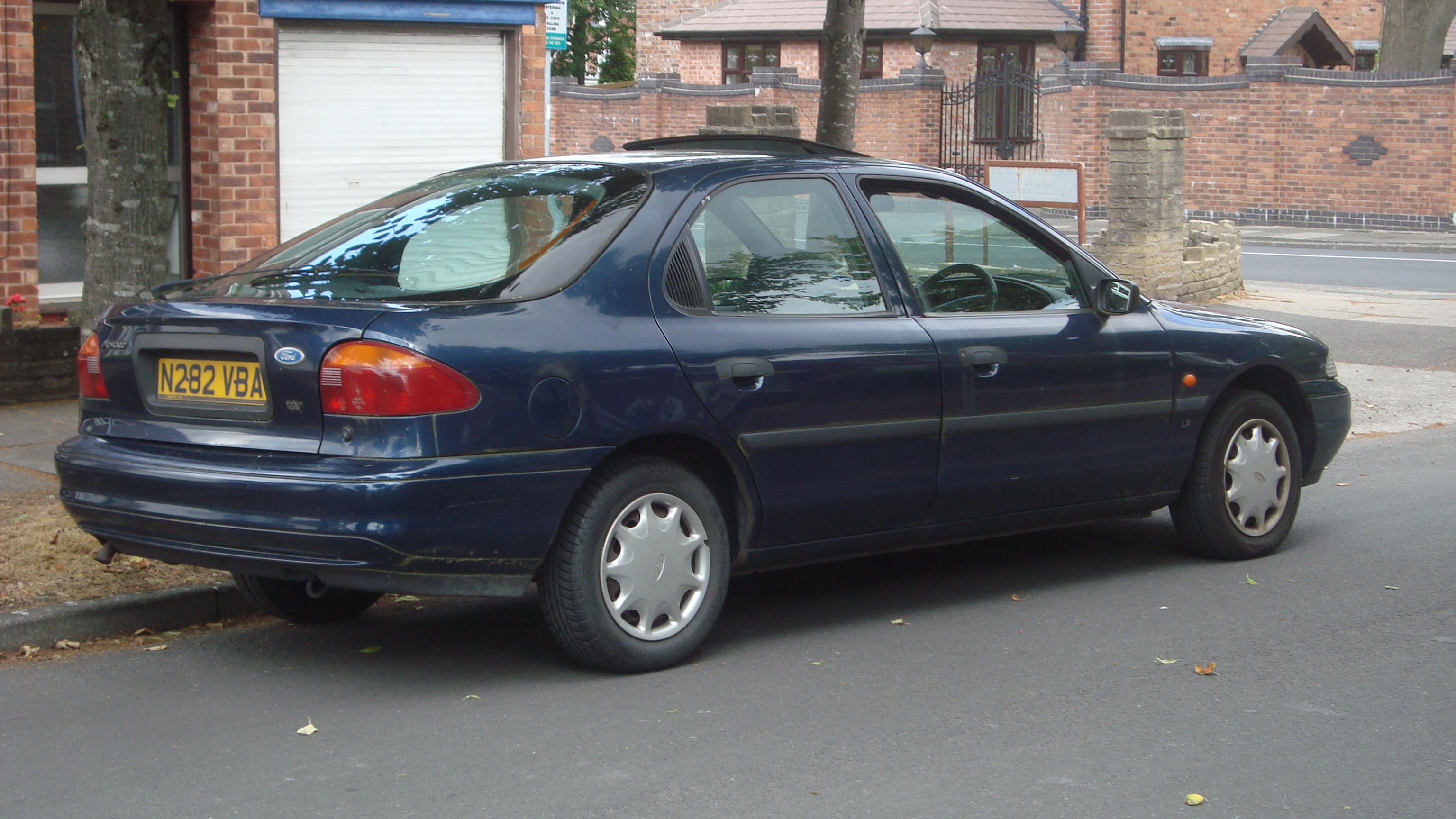
A 1995 Ford Mondeo that a "Mondeo man" may have wanted to own

The concept of the "Mondeo man" was popularised by a phrase used by then Leader of the Labour Party, Tony Blair at the Labour Party Conference in October 1996. He recalled a Ford Sierra owner he had canvassed in the Midlands whilst out campaigning for the 1992 general election. The man was a self-employed electrician, whom Blair met while the man was polishing his car at the weekend, and told Blair that he was an ex-Labour voter who had bought his council house, owned his own car, and wondered what the Labour Party had to offer him given the party's history of raising taxes and mortgage rates:

His dad voted Labour, he said. He used to vote Labour, too. But he'd bought his own house now. He'd set up his own business. He was doing very nicely. "So I've become a Tory" he said. In that moment, he crystallised for me the basis of our failure... His instincts were to get on in life. And he thought our instincts were to stop him. But that was never our history or our purpose.

This is the story that is often credited with inspiring Blair's concept of New Labour, and the "Mondeo man" superseded the "Essex man", as the target of the campaign for the 1997 general election for the Labour Party. (By 1993, the Sierra had been replaced by the Mondeo in the Ford model range, hence the misquote that gave birth to Mondeo Man). Under the leadership of Blair, Labour subsequently won the 1997 general election, with a record landslide majority of 179 MPs.

== See also ==
- Basildon constituency
- Bellwether
- Essex girl
- Holby City woman
- Middle England
- Motorway man
- Nouveau riche
- New Russians
- Obama–Trump voters
- Reagan Democrat
- Red wall (British politics)
- Sanders–Trump voters
- Selsdon Man
- Southern Discomfort (Fabian Society pamphlets)
- Stevenage woman
- White van man
- Worcester woman
- Workington man
