= Swing vote =

Vote potentially going to more than one candidate

A swing vote is a vote that is seen as potentially going to any one of a number of candidates in an election, or, in a two-party system, may go to either of the two dominant political parties. It usually comes from voters who are 'undecided' or who may change their preferences between candidates or parties. Such votes are usually sought after in election campaigns, since they can play a big role in determining the outcome.

A swing voter or floating voter is a voter who may not be affiliated with a particular political party (Independent) or who will vote across party lines. In American politics, many centrists, liberal Republicans, conservative Democrats, and inconsistent voters are considered "swing voters" since their voting patterns cannot be predicted as easily as voters in “safe seat” voters.

While the swing voter is ostensibly the target of most political activity during elections, another factor is the success of each party in rallying its core support. In a two-party system, those who become disillusioned with their once-favoured party are more likely to vote for a third-party or abstain than cross over.

Smaller groups that use voting to decide matters, such as chambers of parliament and supreme courts, can also have swing voters. The smaller the group, the more power swing voters can have. For example, on the Supreme Court of the United States, a court of nine judges, one judge may be seen as single-handedly deciding a case when four others are committed to each side.

== Impact on campaigning ==
Swing Vote can have a very broad meaning and has been used in many different contexts by different media and news outlets. One definition is someone who has not yet made up their mind on how they will be voting. These voters can be easily persuaded and are cross pressured. If some voters are firm, clear, dependable supporters of one candidate or the other, swing voters are the opposite: those whose final allegiance is in some doubt all the way up until election day. This is particularly significant when considering where political parties choose to focus their campaigning efforts. The voters who can be convinced are the voters that receive the most attention because campaigns will not bother to engage the voters they know will show up to the polls and support them. In the state of New York, voters almost always vote Democrat so the Democratic and Republican candidates do not spend much campaign time there as there is little chance the outcome will change.

Whether swing voters actually exist is a point of contention. Prior to an election, some voters may claim to be "swing voters", open to the idea of changing their vote. But in reality, they are not as "undecided" as they may claim. They have pre-existing biases and history that almost always draws them to one political side or the other.

Focusing only on the undecided voters instead of all voters at large is a core part of almost all political campaigns. With this framework in mind, the idea of a swing vote can closely tie with the concept of swing states. Swing/Battleground states are states that neither party can guarantee will go in their favour. These are the states that politicians will most likely focus their time to maximize their reach, in the same way that there is a focus on swing voters. Identifying battleground states is much easier than identifying individual swing votes.

To some extent, it is unclear if a state truly is a "swing state." For decades Missouri was the ultimate "swing" state until 2004 when it "swung" from Democrat to Republican. Since then it has been reliably Republican in presidential elections. The same can be said for the state of Florida which was famously the deciding state in the 2000 presidential election, but in the 2016, 2020 and 2024 presidential elections has become reliably Republican. Colorado and Virginia also went from "swing states" to reliably Democrat in recent presidential elections as well.

With battleground states being essential in a potential close call in a future election, campaigns must balance their efforts, targeting persuadable voters while energizing their base to ensure high turnout. The 1960 election, where swing voters tipped the scales for Kennedy, demonstrates the importance of strategic resource allocation, prioritizing battleground areas where both groups can be influenced. However, swing voters often reinforce existing trends rather than decisively shifting outcomes, showing the need for campaigns to focus on broad appeal through national messaging and policies that resonate across demographics.

== Calculating a swing votes ==
Deciding who is a swing voter can be calculated by measuring how a voter feels about each of the candidates. The American National Election Studies (ANES) created a scale by asking how favourably they see each candidate from negative 100 to 100, with zero as neutral. Then, the two scores for the candidates are subtracted and the smaller the difference is, the more likely that the person is a swing voter. The answers are indicative of the voters voting behaviour and their ideological identification. The ANES also shows about the relationship between scale position and “convertibility”—the likelihood that a campaign can change a person's vote intention. This method of measurement is also a good indication of how polarized the public already is. For example, in 2004, only 13% of the voters were considered swing voters which is low compared to previous elections.

== Profile ==
In an election, there are "certain" or "lock" votes, voters who are solidly behind or partisan to a particular candidate and will not consider changing their minds whatever the opposition says. Swing voters are undecided about how they will vote. They are sometimes referred to as undecideds, undecided voters, or floating voter. Which is essentially respondents who tell pollsters that they do not know how they are going to vote in the upcoming election.

They may be dissatisfied party members who are open to the idea of voting for other parties, or they could be officially registered as "independents" or simply people who have never had a strong affiliation with any political party and will vote depending on certain things such as valance factors with may influence them: healthcare, benefits, election campaign, etc.

Some, but not all, swing voters are considered to be "low-information voters." Because the votes of swing voters are considered to be "up for grabs," candidates direct a fair proportion of campaign effort towards them, but they must also be concerned with voter turnout among their political base. There is a perception that swing voters are primarily motivated by self-interest rather than values or ideology and so are particularly susceptible to pork barreling.

If a constituency contains a large proportion of swing voters it is often called a marginal seat and extensive campaign resources are poured into it.

== Demographics within the United States ==
An April 2016 poll by the Progressive Policy Institute examined voters in the U.S. states considered "battlegrounds" in the upcoming presidential election (Florida, Ohio, Colorado and Nevada). Swing voters were slightly more likely to be women (52% women, 48% men) and slightly less likely to have a college degree (44%) than voters overall in these states (48%. By contrast, race was a significant determinant, especially for African-Americans. While 7% of poll respondents identified as African-American, only 2% of swing voters were African-American. Latinos (12% of poll respondents) were represented more proportionately (13% of swing voters).

"Overall, white voters are likely to swing the outcome of a national election by an average of 10 percentage points—voting more Democratic in elections Democrats win and more Republican in elections Republicans win," according to a 2008 report by the Democratic Leadership Council. Most of this (6.7 of the 10 percentage points) is due to those white people who have only a high school education.

In mid-term and presidential elections from 1992 to 2014, people who self-identified as "gay, lesbian, or bisexual" voted consistently "around 75% Democratic within a range of 67 to 81%." In the 2016 presidential election, people who identified as gay, lesbian, bisexual or transgender cast 78% of their votes for the Democratic candidate Hillary Clinton.

Among people who identify as gay and bisexual, men's support for Democratic candidates in the 1990s Congressional elections (held every two years from 1990 to 1998) was more consistent than women's. Across these five elections, men's support ranged from 67% to 75%, while women's support ranged from 53% to 82%. This suggests that lesbian and bisexual women may be more likely swing voters, at least over time, if not necessarily for any given election. There are also differences by state: "California GLB voters are more likely to identify as 'Independent' than are GLB voters nationally, and therefore have a greater potential to play the role of a swing vote in a close election."

In the 2020 election, 30% of voters were considered swing voters. The swing votes in this election demographically were younger, ideologically moderate, disengaged in politics. Political apathy also plays a part in identifying swing voters. 24% of swing voters did not vote in the 2016 election and 22% did not vote in the 2018 election. 18-29 year olds were the age group that had the highest percentage of swing voters - there was about the same number of swing voters as there were "decided voters". In the oldest age group of 65 and older, only 22% are considered swing voters. Another important data point from the 2020 election was that 39% of Swing Voters say they are paying "a lot" of attention to politics, compared to the 68% of decided voters that pay attention.

The 2024 election highlights how new voter groups can emerge that had been unseen before. What now looks like a new group called "Barstool Conservatives" would have been seen to the election as "swing voters". But the relevance of Donald Trump in American politics through the 2024 election, and the future, highlights how a "swing voter" can become the base demographic of a candidate.

== Impact ==
Swing voters occasionally play a huge part in elections. First-time voters and swing voters are usually credited for helping Jesse Ventura win the Minnesota gubernatorial election in 1998. Swing voters who support third-party candidates take potential votes away from the major candidates. Ventura was a third-party candidate; his opponents were seen as two weak major-party candidates, and this situation created many more swing voters than usual. This resulted in Jesse Ventura, the third-party candidate, winning the election.

In the Supreme Court of the United States the swing justice, if one exists, essentially decides the overall outcome of the ruling during a split, which can mean highly impacting landmark decisions. For example, the effective decision of the President of the United States in the 2000 election was ultimately made by Justice Anthony Kennedy in the Bush v. Gore case.

== Examples ==
Common examples of swing voters include "Reagan Democrats" (Democrats who voted for Republican Ronald Reagan in the 1980s) and "Clinton Conservatives" (Republicans who voted for Democrat Bill Clinton in the 1990s). In her 2012 book The Swing Vote, Linda Killian divides the American swing vote into 4 factions: NPR Republicans, America First Democrats, the Facebook Generation, and Starbucks Moms and Dads. On the Supreme Court of the United States, Associate Justices Potter Stewart, Byron White, Lewis F. Powell Jr., Sandra Day O'Connor, Anthony Kennedy, and Chief Justice John Roberts have been described as swing votes between the two factions of the court. In the United Kingdom, the "Essex man", "Worcester woman" and "Holby City woman" are examples of personifications of swing voters.

== See also ==
- Independent voter
- Marginal seat
- Median voter theorem
- Political apathy
- Split-ticket voting
- Swing (politics)
- Swing state
