= List of Advance subsidiaries =

Companies owned by Advanced Publications, Inc

This is a list of subsidiaries of the American media company Advance Publications Inc.

== Local media groups ==
The following subsidiaries are owned through Advance Local:

=== Advance Media New York ===
- The Post-Standard (Syracuse, New York)
  - Syracuse.com
  - NYup.com
    - New York Cannabis Insider
  - Central New York Magazine

=== Advance Ohio ===
- The Plain Dealer (Cleveland, Ohio) / Cleveland.com

=== Alabama Media Group ===
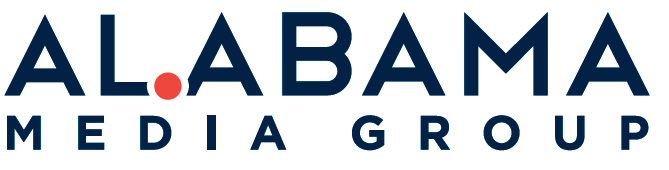

- AL.com and The Lede
  - The Birmingham News (Birmingham, Alabama)
  - The Huntsville Times (Huntsville, Alabama)
  - Press-Register (Mobile, Alabama)
- Alabama Education Lab
- Red Clay Media
  - It's a Southern Thing
  - This is Alabama
  - People of Alabama

=== MassLive Media ===
- The Republican (Springfield, Massachusetts) / MassLive.com

=== MLive Media Group ===
- MLive.com
  - The Ann Arbor News (Ann Arbor, Michigan)
  - Bay City Times (Bay City, Michigan)
  - The Flint Journal (Flint, Michigan)
  - Grand Rapids Press (Grand Rapids, Michigan)
  - Kalamazoo Gazette (Kalamazoo, Michigan)
  - Jackson Citizen Patriot (Jackson, Michigan)
  - Muskegon Chronicle (Muskegon, Michigan)
  - Saginaw News (Saginaw, Michigan)

=== NJ Advance Media ===
- NJ.com
  - The Star-Ledger (Newark, New Jersey)
  - The Times (Trenton, New Jersey)
  - The Jersey Journal (Jersey City, New Jersey)
  - South Jersey Times (South Jersey)
  - Hunterdon County Democrat (Hunterdon County, New Jersey)
    - Hunterdon Observer
    - Warren Reporter (Warren County, New Jersey)
  - Ledger Somerset Observer (Somerset County, New Jersey)
  - Star-Gazette
  - Ledger Local
  - Suburban News
- Jersey's Best
- The Express-Times (Easton, Pennsylvania) / LehighValleyLive.com

=== Oregonian Media Group ===
- The Oregonian (Portland, Oregon) / OregonLive.com
- Here is Oregon

=== PA Media Group ===
- The Patriot-News (Harrisburg, Pennsylvania) / PennLive.com
- Penn Studios

=== Staten Island Media Group ===
- Staten Island Advance (Staten Island, New York) / SILive.com

== Leaders Group ==
Advance Publications purchased Street & Smith Publications, Inc. in August 1959. The Street & Smith trademark was resurrected in 2017, by Advance Publications' subsidiary American City Business Journals, for a series of sports annuals, and transferred later to a newly formed Leaders Group subsidiary of Advance Publications, creating a standalone sports focused division within Advance.

- Street & Smith's Sports Business Journal
- The Esports Observer
- SportTechie
- Newzoo

== Condé Nast ==
=== Print ===
- Allure
- Architectural Digest
- Bon Appétit
- Condé Nast Traveler
- GQ
- The New Yorker
- Vanity Fair
- Vogue
- Wired

=== Digital ===
- Ars Technica
- Backchannel
- Epicurious
- Glamour
- La Cucina Italiana
- Love
- Pitchfork
- Teen Vogue
- them.
- Self

== Other related websites/companies ==
- Street & Smith, acquired 1959
- POP, acquired 2013
- reddit.com, originally part of Condé Nast, moved to Advance Publications in 2011, spun off in early 2012
- Charter Communications shareholder following May 2016 merger of Bright House Networks
- The IRONMAN Group, acquired March 2020
- Warner Bros. Discovery, carried over from its predecessor Discovery, Inc.
- Turnitin an Internet-based plagiarism detection service.

== Former and defunct divisions ==
- RCA purchased Random House in 1965 and later sold it to Advance Publications in 1980. Advance sold Random House to German media conglomerate Bertelsmann in 1998.
- Advance Entertainment Corporation (uplinker and programmer of WWOR EMI Service during 1996)
- Newhouse News Service, bearing the name of Advance Publications founder Samuel Irving Newhouse Sr., was founded in 1961 and closed in late 2008, as a cost-cutting measure due to the 2008 financial crisis; based in Washington, D.C., its staff served as a national news bureau to all publications in the Advance portfolio
- Religion News Service (sold 2011 to the Religion Newswriters Foundation, a non-profit affiliate of the Religion Newswriters Association)
- Parade (sold December 2014)
- Fairchild Fashion Media (sold August 2014 to Penske Media Corporation)
- The Times-Picayune/NOLA.com (sold 2019 to Georges Media Group)

== Former television stations ==
- Stations are arranged in alphabetical order by state and city of license.
- Two boldface asterisks appearing following a station's call letters (**) indicate a station built and signed on by Advance or Newhouse.

Media market	State	Station	Purchased	Sold	Notes
Birmingham	Alabama	WAPI-TV	1956	1980	(Note: Known as WAPT from 1953 to 1958.)
St. Louis	Missouri	KTVI	1955	1980	
Elmira	New York	WSYE-TV **	1956	1980	
Syracuse	New York	WSYR-TV **	1950	1980	
Portland	Oregon	KOIN	1953	1977	
Harrisburg	Pennsylvania	WTPA **	1953	1980	
