= Newspaper endorsements in the 2012 United States presidential election =

Newspapers made endorsements of candidates in the 2012 United States presidential election, as follows. The tables below also indicate which candidate each publication endorsed in the 2008 United States presidential election, where known.

== Barack Obama ==
The following 158 newspapers endorsed Barack Obama for the 2012 presidential election:

=== Daily newspapers ===
| Newspaper | Largest reported circulation | State | 2008 endorsement |
|---|---|---|---|
| The New York Times | 1,265,839 | New York | Barack Obama |
| Chicago Tribune | 779,440 | Illinois | Barack Obama |
| San Jose Mercury News | 690,258 | California | Barack Obama |
| Detroit Free Press | 668,332 | Michigan | Barack Obama |
| The Denver Post | 595,363 | Colorado | Barack Obama |
| Star Tribune (Minneapolis) | 544,186 | Minnesota | Barack Obama |
| Financial Times US | 337,700 | United Kingdom | Barack Obama |
| The Times | 633,718 | United Kingdom | No endorsement |
| The Philadelphia Inquirer | 517,310 | Pennsylvania | Barack Obama |
| Los Angeles Times | 512,744 | California | Barack Obama |
| The Washington Post | 507,615 | District of Columbia | Barack Obama |
| The Plain Dealer (Cleveland) | 440,968 | Ohio | Barack Obama |
| Tampa Bay Times (St. Petersburg) | 432,202 | Florida | Barack Obama |
| The Star-Ledger (Newark) | 413,472 | New Jersey | Barack Obama |
| The Boston Globe | 365,512 | Massachusetts | Barack Obama |
| San Antonio Express-News | 353,572 | Texas | John McCain |
| The Seattle Times | 346,589 | Washington | Barack Obama |
| St. Louis Post-Dispatch | 333,529 | Missouri | Barack Obama |
| Pittsburgh Post-Gazette | 318,962 | Pennsylvania | Barack Obama |
| The Kansas City Star | 310,487 | Missouri | Barack Obama |
| San Francisco Chronicle | 296,874 | California | Barack Obama |
| The Sacramento Bee | 271,610 | California | Barack Obama |
| Hartford Courant | 256,900 | Connecticut | Barack Obama |
| The San Francisco Examiner | 255,527 | California | John McCain |
| Las Vegas Sun | 252,174 | Nevada | Barack Obama |
| The Buffalo News | 233,069 | New York | Barack Obama |
| The Courier-Journal (Louisville) | 232,811 | Kentucky | Barack Obama |
| Honolulu Star-Advertiser | 224,973 | Hawaii | Barack Obama (Endorsement was from The Honolulu Advertiser in 2008) |
| The Charlotte Observer | 216,862 | North Carolina | Barack Obama |
| The Miami Herald | 212,541 | Florida | Barack Obama |
| The News & Observer (Raleigh) | 196,219 | North Carolina | Barack Obama |
| The Baltimore Sun | 195,561 | Maryland | Barack Obama |
| The Record (Hackensack) | 167,969 | New Jersey | Barack Obama |
| Contra Costa Times | 175,535 | California | Barack Obama |
| Democrat and Chronicle (Rochester) | 154,922 | New York | Barack Obama |
| The Fresno Bee | 154,873 | California | Barack Obama |
| Arizona Daily Star (Tucson) | 154,715 | Arizona | Barack Obama |
| Asbury Park Press | 150,646 | New Jersey | Barack Obama |
| The Salt Lake Tribune | 140,628 | Utah | Barack Obama |
| Toledo Blade | 127,953 | Ohio | Barack Obama |
| Times Union (Albany) | 125,506 | New York | Barack Obama |
| Akron Beacon Journal | 122,598 | Ohio | Barack Obama |
| The Providence Journal | 122,377 | Rhode Island | Barack Obama |
| The Patriot-News (Harrisburg) | 118,655 | Pennsylvania | Barack Obama |
| Lexington Herald-Leader | 115,737 | Kentucky | Barack Obama |
| The News Journal (Wilmington) | 111,344 | Delaware | Barack Obama |
| The News Tribune (Tacoma) | 105,207 | Washington | Barack Obama |
| The Republican (Springfield) | 103,330 | Massachusetts | John McCain |
| Philadelphia Daily News | | Pennsylvania | Barack Obama |
| La Opinión (Los Angeles) | 95,148 | California | |
| El Paso Times | 91,972 | Texas | John McCain |
| Ventura County Star | 80,494 | California | |
| Chattanooga Times Free Press (Times editorial) | 75,336 | Tennessee | Barack Obama |
| Winston-Salem Journal | 74,066 | North Carolina | John McCain |
| Erie Times-News | 69,659 | Pennsylvania | Barack Obama |
| Lincoln Journal Star | 68,816 | Nebraska | John McCain |
| The Charleston Gazette | 66,633 | West Virginia | Barack Obama |
| The Vindicator (Youngstown) | 60,205 | Ohio | Barack Obama |
| Kalamazoo Gazette | 56,079 | Michigan | No endorsement |
| Bangor Daily News | 52,093 | Maine | Barack Obama |
| The Herald (Everett) | 50,795 | Washington | No endorsement |
| Asheville Citizen-Times | 48,653 | North Carolina | Barack Obama |
| The Free Lance–Star (Fredericksburg) | 47,665 | Virginia | |
| The Times-Tribune (Scranton) | 47,131 | Pennsylvania | Barack Obama |
| Post-Bulletin (Rochester) | | Minnesota | Barack Obama |
| Montgomery Advertiser | 44,010 | Alabama | Barack Obama |
| Staten Island Advance | 42,899 | | |
| The Burlington Free Press | 35,299 | Vermont | Barack Obama |
| La Crosse Tribune | 34,339 | Wisconsin | Barack Obama |
| Muskegon Chronicle | 34,179 | Michigan | Barack Obama |
| Daily Camera (Boulder) | 32,753 | Colorado | Barack Obama |
| Marin Independent Journal | 32,150 | California | Barack Obama |
| TimesDaily (Florence) | | Alabama | Barack Obama |
| The Berkshire Eagle (Pittsfield) | 26,201 | Massachusetts | Barack Obama |
| The Monterey County Herald | 26,000 | California | Barack Obama |
| Mansfield News Journal | 25,893 | Ohio | Barack Obama |
| Wausau Daily Herald | 25,060 | Wisconsin | Barack Obama |
| Las Cruces Sun-News | 24,167 | New Mexico | Barack Obama |
| The Decatur Daily | | Alabama | Barack Obama |
| The Herald (Rock Hill) | 22,948 | South Carolina | Barack Obama |
| The Santa Fe New Mexican | 20,781 | New Mexico | Barack Obama |
| Valley News (Lebanon) | | New Hampshire | Barack Obama |
| The News Leader (Staunton) | 16,166 | Virginia | Barack Obama |
| Chillicothe Gazette | 10,054 | | |
| Del Rio News-Herald | | Texas | |
| Oakland Tribune | | California | Barack Obama |
| The Keene Sentinel | 9,978 | New Hampshire | Barack Obama |
| The Portsmouth Herald | 9,807 | New Hampshire | Barack Obama |
| The Durango Herald | | Colorado | Barack Obama |
| The Daily Astorian | 8,000 | Oregon | Barack Obama |
| The Aspen Times | 9,000 | Colorado | Barack Obama |
| Post Independent (Glenwood Springs) | 9,000 | Colorado | |
| The Anniston Star | 18,985 | Alabama | Barack Obama |
| AnnArbor.com | 34,923 | Michigan | No endorsement (as The Ann Arbor News) |
| Haaretz (Tel Aviv) | 95,000 | Israel | |
| The Globe and Mail (Toronto) | | Canada | |
| Santa Maria Times (California) | 17,943 | California | Barack Obama |
| The Hawk Eye | | Iowa | Barack Obama |
| Stamford Advocate | 21,549 | Connecticut | Barack Obama |
| The Enterprise (Brockton) | 27,702 | Massachusetts | Barack Obama |

=== Weekly newspapers ===
| Newspaper | Largest reported circulation | State | 2008 endorsement |
|---|---|---|---|
| The Phoenix | | Massachusetts | Barack Obama |
| The Stranger (Seattle) | 67,999 | Washington | Barack Obama |
| Arkansas Times (Little Rock) | 26,033 | Arkansas | Barack Obama |
| Aurora Sentinel | 36,000 | Colorado | Barack Obama |
| The Flint Journal | 66,622 | Michigan | Barack Obama |
| Montclair Times | 7,814 | New Jersey | |
| Eugene Weekly | 37,576 | Oregon | Barack Obama |
| Northwest Asian Weekly (Seattle) | 25,000 | Washington | |
| The Austin Chronicle | 82,772 | Texas | Barack Obama |
| The Capital Times (Madison; 2x weekly) | online | Wisconsin | Barack Obama |
| St. Louis American | 66,000 | Missouri | Barack Obama |
| Falls Church News-Press | 30,000 | Virginia | Barack Obama |
| Washington City Paper | 68,059 | District of Columbia | Barack Obama |
| Tucson Weekly | 45,583 | Arizona | Barack Obama |
| East Bay Express (Oakland) | 42,696 | California | |
| La Prensa (Toledo) | | Ohio | |
| Jackson Free Press | 17,000 | Mississippi | Barack Obama |
| Sacramento News & Review | 70,539 | California | Barack Obama |
| The Vermont Standard (Woodstock) | | | |
| Dorchester Reporter | 6,000 | Massachusetts | Barack Obama |
| City Newspaper (Rochester) | 40,000 | New York | Barack Obama |
| The Medfield Press | | Massachusetts | Barack Obama |
| Willamette Week (Portland) | 90,000 | Oregon | Barack Obama |
| The Seward Phoenix Log | 1,865 | Alaska | |
| The Malibu Times | 12,000 | California | |
| Santa Barbara Independent | 40,000 | California | Barack Obama |
| Boulder Weekly | 25,000 | Colorado | Barack Obama |
| Colorado Springs Independent | 36,000 | Colorado | Barack Obama |
| Seattle Medium | 13,500 | Washington | |
| Cincinnati CityBeat | 40,000 | Ohio | Barack Obama |
| The Athens NEWS (2x-weekly) | 18,018 | Ohio | Barack Obama |

=== Magazines ===
| Magazine | Largest reported circulation | State | 2008 endorsement |
|---|---|---|---|
| The New Yorker | 1,043,792 | New York | Barack Obama |
| The Economist | 847,313 (North American Edition) | United Kingdom | Barack Obama |
| The Nation | 140,787 | New York | Barack Obama |

=== College and university newspapers ===
| Newspaper | Institution | Largest reported circulation | State | 2008 endorsement |
|---|---|---|---|---|
| The Michigan Daily | University of Michigan | | Michigan | Barack Obama |
| The Harvard Crimson | Harvard University | | Massachusetts | Barack Obama |
| Columbia Daily Spectator | Columbia University | 8,000 | New York | Barack Obama |
| Central Michigan Life | Central Michigan University | 13,500 | Michigan | Barack Obama |
| Daily Athenaeum | West Virginia University | | West Virginia | Barack Obama |
| Daily Nebraskan | University of Nebraska–Lincoln | | Nebraska | |
| Yale Daily News | Yale University | | Connecticut | Barack Obama |
| The Emory Wheel | Emory University | | Georgia | |
| The Daily Orange | Syracuse University | | New York | Barack Obama |
| The Brown Daily Herald | Brown University | | Rhode Island | |
| The Daily Princetonian | Princeton University | | New Jersey | |
| The Tufts Daily | Tufts University | | Massachusetts | Barack Obama |
| The Justice | Brandeis University | | Massachusetts | Barack Obama |
| The Daily Californian | University of California, Berkeley | | California | Barack Obama |
| UCSD Guardian | University of California, San Diego | | California | |
| Daily Bruin | University of California, Los Angeles | | California | Barack Obama |
| Daily 49er | California State University, Long Beach | | California | |
| The Post | Ohio University | 10,000 | Ohio | Barack Obama |
| The Spartan Daily | San Jose State University | | California | |
| Arizona Daily Wildcat | University of Arizona | | Arizona | Barack Obama |
| The Daily Iowan | University of Iowa | | Iowa | Barack Obama |
| The Maneater | University of Missouri | | Missouri | Barack Obama |
| The Pitt News | University of Pittsburgh | | Pennsylvania | Barack Obama |
| The Criterion | Colorado Mesa University | | Colorado | John McCain |
| The State News | Michigan State University | 14,500 | Michigan | Barack Obama |

== Mitt Romney ==
The following 112 newspapers endorsed Mitt Romney for the 2012 presidential election:

=== Daily newspapers ===
| Newspaper | Largest reported circulation | State | 2008 endorsement |
|---|---|---|---|
| Houston Chronicle | 916,934 | Texas | Barack Obama |
| Dallas Morning News | 702,848 | Texas | John McCain |
| Daily News (New York) | 579,636 | New York | Barack Obama |
| New York Post | 555,327 | New York | John McCain |
| The Arizona Republic (Phoenix) | 538,579 | Arizona | John McCain |
| Newsday | 471,662 | New York | Barack Obama |
| U-T San Diego | 296,331 | California | John McCain |
| Orlando Sentinel | 288,328 | Florida | Barack Obama |
| The Cincinnati Enquirer | 278,607 | Ohio | John McCain |
| Fort Worth Star-Telegram | 275,345 | Texas | Barack Obama |
| The Columbus Dispatch | 264,802 | Ohio | John McCain |
| The Tampa Tribune | 262,369 | Florida | John McCain |
| South Florida Sun-Sentinel (Fort Lauderdale) | 245,869 | Florida | Barack Obama |
| Las Vegas Review-Journal | 220,619 | Nevada | John McCain |
| The Des Moines Register | 216,648 | Iowa | Barack Obama |
| The Tennessean (Nashville) | 216,434 | Tennessee | Barack Obama |
| Pittsburgh Tribune-Review | 202,230 | Pennsylvania | John McCain |
| The Oklahoman (Oklahoma City) | 187,240 | Oklahoma | John McCain |
| Omaha World-Herald | 168,403 | Nebraska | John McCain |
| Richmond Times-Dispatch | 162,769 | Virginia | John McCain |
| The Florida Times-Union (Jacksonville) | 157,559 | Florida | No endorsement |
| The Press-Enterprise (Riverside) | 156,545 | California | John McCain |
| The Grand Rapids Press | 149,667 | Michigan | John McCain |
| The Detroit News | 133,508 | Michigan | John McCain |
| Tulsa World | 133,066 | Oklahoma | John McCain |
| Wisconsin State Journal (Madison) | 112,677 | Wisconsin | Barack Obama |
| Boston Herald | 108,548 | Massachusetts | John McCain |
| Daily Herald (Arlington Heights) | 106,326 | Illinois | Barack Obama |
| Albuquerque Journal | 102,150 | New Mexico | |
| Los Angeles Daily News | 97,606 | California | Barack Obama |
| The Times of Northwest Indiana (Munster) | 91,627 | Indiana | John McCain |
| Florida Today (Melbourne) | 89,258 | Florida | Barack Obama |
| The Spokesman-Review (Spokane) | 87,694 | Washington | John McCain |
| Naples Daily News | 86,558 | Florida | Barack Obama |
| The Gazette (Colorado Springs) | 84,661 | Colorado | No endorsement |
| Press-Telegram (Long Beach) | 82,556 | California | Barack Obama |
| Green Bay Press-Gazette | 80,870 | Wisconsin | John McCain |
| North County Times (Escondido) | 80,789 | California | John McCain |
| Telegram & Gazette (Worcester) | 79,958 | Massachusetts | Barack Obama |
| Daily Breeze (Torrance) | 75,352 | California | Barack Obama |
| Quad-City Times (Davenport) | 70,051 | Iowa | Barack Obama |
| Inland Valley Daily Bulletin (Ontario) | 63,553 | California | Barack Obama |
| The San Bernardino Sun | 62,536 | California | Barack Obama |
| Cedar Rapids Gazette | 60,485 | Iowa | John McCain |
| Reno Gazette-Journal | 53,562 | Nevada | Barack Obama |
| The Columbian (Vancouver) | 51,764 | Washington | Barack Obama |
| The Times (Shreveport) | 51,297 | Louisiana | Barack Obama |
| The Forum of Fargo-Moorhead | 49,880 | North Dakota | John McCain |
| The Sun (Lowell) | 48,213 | Massachusetts | John McCain |
| Statesman Journal (Salem) | 45,218 | Oregon | Barack Obama |
| Savannah Morning News | 46,326 | Georgia | John McCain |
| Billings Gazette | 44,937 | Montana | Barack Obama |
| Lubbock Avalanche-Journal | 44,681 | Texas | John McCain |
| New Hampshire Union Leader (Manchester) | 44,665 | New Hampshire | John McCain |
| The Pueblo Chieftain | 41,428 | Colorado | John McCain |
| Pasadena Star-News | 40,485 | California | Barack Obama |
| The Intelligencer (Doylestown) | 40,045 | Pennsylvania | Barack Obama |
| Journal & Courier (Lafayette) | 34,630 | Indiana | Barack Obama |
| Mitchell Daily Republic | | South Dakota | |
| Sun Journal (Lewiston) | | Maine | |
| Sioux City Journal | 36,123 | Iowa | John McCain |
| The Southern Illinoisan (Carbondale) | 33,782 | Illinois | John McCain |
| Northwest Herald (Crystal Lake) | 34,458 | Illinois | John McCain |
| Cape Cod Times | 39,970 | Massachusetts | Barack Obama |
| The Bismarck Tribune | 29,145 | North Dakota | John McCain |
| The Intelligencer & Wheeling News Register | 25,556 | West Virginia | John McCain |
| The Daily Reflector (Greenville) | 20,177 | North Carolina | Barack Obama |
| Longmont Times-Call | 19,062 | Colorado | John McCain |
| The Daily Tribune (Royal Oak) | 6,180 | Michigan | Barack Obama |
| Cherokee Tribune (Canton) | 4,771 | Georgia | |
| The Journal (Martinsburg) | 16,851 | West Virginia | John McCain |
| Weirton Daily Times | 4,574 | West Virginia | John McCain |
| The Parkersburg News and Sentinel | 28,044 | West Virginia | John McCain |
| The Inter-Mountain (Elkins) | 9,037 | West Virginia | John McCain |
| The Messenger (Fort Dodge) | 15,237 | Iowa | John McCain |
| The Daily News (Galveston) | | Texas | John McCain |
| Sentinel & Enterprise (Fitchburg) | 15,031 | Massachusetts | Barack Obama |
| Grand Junction Daily Sentinel | 26,654 | Colorado | John McCain |
| Estherville Daily News | | Iowa | |
| Pensacola News Journal | | Florida | Barack Obama |
| Casper Star-Tribune | 24,791 | Wyoming | Barack Obama |
| Bluefield Daily Telegraph | 16,138 | West Virginia | Barack Obama |
| Duluth News Tribune | | Minnesota | John McCain |
| Charleston Daily Mail | 17,879 | West Virginia | John McCain |
| The Star-Herald (Scottsbluff) | 12,864 | Nebraska | |
| The Washington Examiner | | District of Columbia | John McCain |
| The Joplin Globe | 20,414 | Missouri | Barack Obama |
| Quincy Herald-Whig | 20,419 | Illinois | |
| Sauk Valley Telegraph & Gazette (Dixon & Sterling) | 18,301 | Illinois | John McCain |
| The Lima News | 36,848 | Ohio | No endorsement |
| Tyler Morning Telegraph | 30,421 | Texas | John McCain |
| The Telegraph (Nashua) | 22,169 | New Hampshire | Barack Obama |
| The Bemidji Pioneer | 10,715 | Minnesota | John McCain |
| Danville Register & Bee | 17,407 | Virginia | John McCain |
| San Angelo Standard-Times | 22,101 | Texas | Barack Obama |
| The Washington Times | 38,587 | District of Columbia | John McCain |
| The Herald-Dispatch (Huntington) | 28,287 | West Virginia | Barack Obama |
| The Daily Courier (Prescott) | 14,405 | Arizona | John McCain |
| Casa Grande Dispatch | 7,289 | Arizona | John McCain |
| Minot Daily News | 16,535 | North Dakota | John McCain |
| Waco Tribune-Herald | 36,716 | Texas | No endorsement |
| Laredo Morning Times | 14,018 | Texas | |
| The Morning Journal (Lorain) | 22,487 | Ohio | John McCain |
| Grand Forks Herald | 27,636 | North Dakota | John McCain |
| The News-Sentinel (Fort Wayne) | 16,173 | Indiana | John McCain |

=== Weekly/monthly newspapers ===
| Newspaper | Largest reported circulation | State | 2008 endorsement |
|---|---|---|---|
| The New York Observer | 52,000 | New York | Barack Obama |
| Chicago Jewish Star (2x monthly) | 17,500 | Illinois | John McCain |
| Sun Prairie Star | 4,400 | Wisconsin | |
| New Richmond News | 5,000 | Wisconsin | John McCain |
| South Washington County Bulletin | | Minnesota | |

=== Magazines ===
| Magazine | Largest reported circulation | State | 2008 endorsement |
|---|---|---|---|
| The National Interest | | District of Columbia | |
| National Review | 166,755 | New York | John McCain |

== Gary Johnson ==
The following newspapers endorsed Gary Johnson for the 2012 presidential election:

=== Daily newspapers ===
| Newspaper | Largest reported circulation | State | 2008 endorsement |
|---|---|---|---|
| Chattanooga Times Free Press (Free Press editorial) | 75,336 | Tennessee | John McCain |

=== Weekly newspapers ===
| Newspaper | Largest reported circulation | State | 2008 endorsement |
|---|---|---|---|
| Saint Joseph Telegraph | | Missouri | No endorsement |

== Jill Stein ==
The following newspapers endorsed Jill Stein for the 2012 presidential election:

=== Weekly newspapers ===
| Newspaper | Largest reported circulation | State | 2008 endorsement |
|---|---|---|---|
| Maui Time Weekly (Wailuku) | 18,000 | Hawaii | |

=== College and university newspapers ===
| Newspaper | Institution | Largest reported circulation | State | 2008 endorsement |
|---|---|---|---|---|
| The Georgetown Voice | Georgetown University | 6,000 | District of Columbia | Barack Obama |

== No endorsement ==
=== Discontinued endorsing candidates ===
- Chicago Sun-Times—Endorsed Barack Obama in 2008.
- Dayton Daily News—Endorsed Barack Obama in 2008.
- Knoxville News Sentinel—Endorsed John McCain in 2008.
- Milwaukee Journal Sentinel—Endorsed Barack Obama in 2008.
- St. Paul Pioneer Press—Did not endorse in 2008.
- The Tuscaloosa News—Endorsed Barack Obama in 2008.
- Sarasota Herald-Tribune—Endorsed Barack Obama in 2008.
- The Atlanta Journal-Constitution—Endorsed Barack Obama in 2008.

=== No endorsement in 2012 ===
- Austin American-Statesman—Endorsed Barack Obama in 2008.
- The Oregonian (Portland)—Endorsed Barack Obama in 2008.
- The State Journal-Register (Springfield, Illinois)—Endorsed Barack Obama in 2008.
- The Indianapolis Star—Did not endorse in 2008 either.
- Times Record News (Wichita Falls)—Endorsed John McCain in 2008.
- The Times-Picayune (New Orleans)—Endorsed Barack Obama in 2008.
- The Palm Beach Post—Endorsed Barack Obama in 2008.
- The Birmingham News—Endorsed John McCain in 2008.
- The Bakersfield Californian—Endorsed John McCain in 2008.

=== Other ===
- The Post-Standard (Syracuse) -- Listed itself as "undecided" and criticized both candidates. Endorsed Barack Obama in 2008.
