= George Lewis =

George Lewis may refer to:

== Entertainment and art ==
- G. B. W. Lewis (George Benjamin William Lewis, 1818–1906), circus rider and theatre manager in Australia
- George E. Lewis (born 1952), American composer and free jazz trombonist
- George J. Lewis (1903–1995), Mexican-born American actor
- George Robert Lewis (1782–1871), English painter of landscapes and portraits
- George Lewis (clarinetist) (1900–1968), New Orleans jazz clarinettist
- George Lewis, Jr. aka Twin Shadow (born 1983), Dominican-American musician and actor

== Politics ==
- George Lowys or Lewis (fl. 1536), mayor of Winchelsea
- George Lewis (MP for Cardiff), Member of Parliament (MP) for Cardiff, 1586
- George Cornewall Lewis (1806–1863), British statesman
- George Lewis (politician) (1820–1887), American politician, mayor of Roxbury, Massachusetts

== Sports ==
- George Lewis (athlete) (1917–2011), track and field athlete from Trinidad and Tobago
- George Lewis (footballer, born 1875) (1875–?), English footballer
- George Lewis (footballer, born 1913) (1913–1981), Watford and Southampton footballer
- George Lewis (footballer, born 2000), Rwandan-born, Norwegian footballer
- George Lewis (rugby league), rugby league footballer of the 1920s, 1930s and 1940s
- George Lewis (rugby) (1897–1988), Welsh rugby union and rugby league footballer
- Duffy Lewis (George Edward Lewis, 1888–1979), Major League Baseball player

== Other ==
- George Lewis (British Army officer) (1735–1791), British colonel
- George Lewis (Royal Marines officer) (1774–1854), in Napoleonic Wars and War of 1812
- George Lewis (coleopterist) (1839–1926), English entomologist
- George W. Lewis (1882–1948), director of aeronautical research at NACA
- George Lewis (journalist) (born 1943), American television reporter
- Sir George Lewis, 1st Baronet (1833–1911), UK solicitor, baronet
- Slave George (1794–1811), murder victim, known also as George Lewis
- George Lewis (priest) (died 1730), Archdeacon of Meath
- George F. Lewis (1828–1890), American journalist and newspaper proprietor

== See also ==
- George Henry Lewes (1817–1878), British philosopher
- George Louis (disambiguation)
