= Hugh Mercer =

General in the American Revolutionary War (1726–1777)

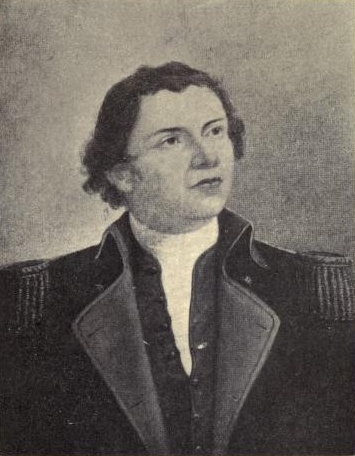
- Hugh Mercer
- Born: 16 January 1726; Pitsligo, Aberdeenshire, Scotland
- Died: 12 January 1777 (aged 50); Princeton, New Jersey, US
- Burial place: Laurel Hill Cemetery, Philadelphia, Pennsylvania
- Education: University of Aberdeen
- Relatives: Hugh W. Mercer (grandson); Johnny Mercer and George S. Patton (great-great-great grandsons)
- Military career
- Allegiance: Jacobites; Great Britain; United States
- Branch: Jacobite Army; Pennsylvania Militia; Continental Army
- Service years: Jacobite Army (1745–1746); Pennsylvania Militia (1755–1776); Continental Army (1776–1777)
- Rank: Brigadier general (Continental Army)
- Conflicts: Jacobite rising of 1745; Battle of Culloden; French and Indian War; Kittanning Expedition; Battle of Fort Duquesne; American Revolutionary War; Battle of Trenton; Battle of Princeton (DOW)
- Other work: Surgeon, apothecary

Hugh Mercer (January 16, 1726 – January 12, 1777) was a Scottish brigadier general in the Continental Army during the American Revolutionary War. He fought in the New York and New Jersey campaign and was mortally wounded at the Battle of Princeton.

Mercer was born in Pitsligo, Aberdeenshire, Scotland and studied medicine at the University of Aberdeen. He served as an assistant surgeon in Charles Edward Stuart's army during the Battle of Culloden in the Jacobite rising of 1745.

The uprising failed, and Mercer escaped to the Province of Pennsylvania where he lived in Greencastle, near Mercersburg, Pennsylvania and Fredericksburg, Virginia. He worked as a physician and established an apothecary. He served alongside George Washington in the provincial troops during the French and Indian War, and he and Washington became close friends.

== Early life and education ==
Mercer was born on January 16, 1726, in Pitsligo, Aberdeenshire, Scotland to Ann Monro and the Reverend William Mercer, a minister in the Church of Scotland.

At age 15, he began studying medicine at the University of Aberdeen's Marischal College, and graduated as a physician in 1744. He served as an assistant surgeon in the army of Charles Edward Stuart during the Jacobite rising of 1745, and was present at the Battle of Culloden when Charles' army was defeated on 16 April 1746.

As a fugitive in his homeland, Mercer fled Scotland after months in hiding. In the fall of 1746, he departed Leith by ship and sailed to Philadelphia. He settled in Pennsylvania near Greencastle, now known as Mercersburg, and practiced medicine as a physician and apothecary for eight years.

== French and Indian War ==
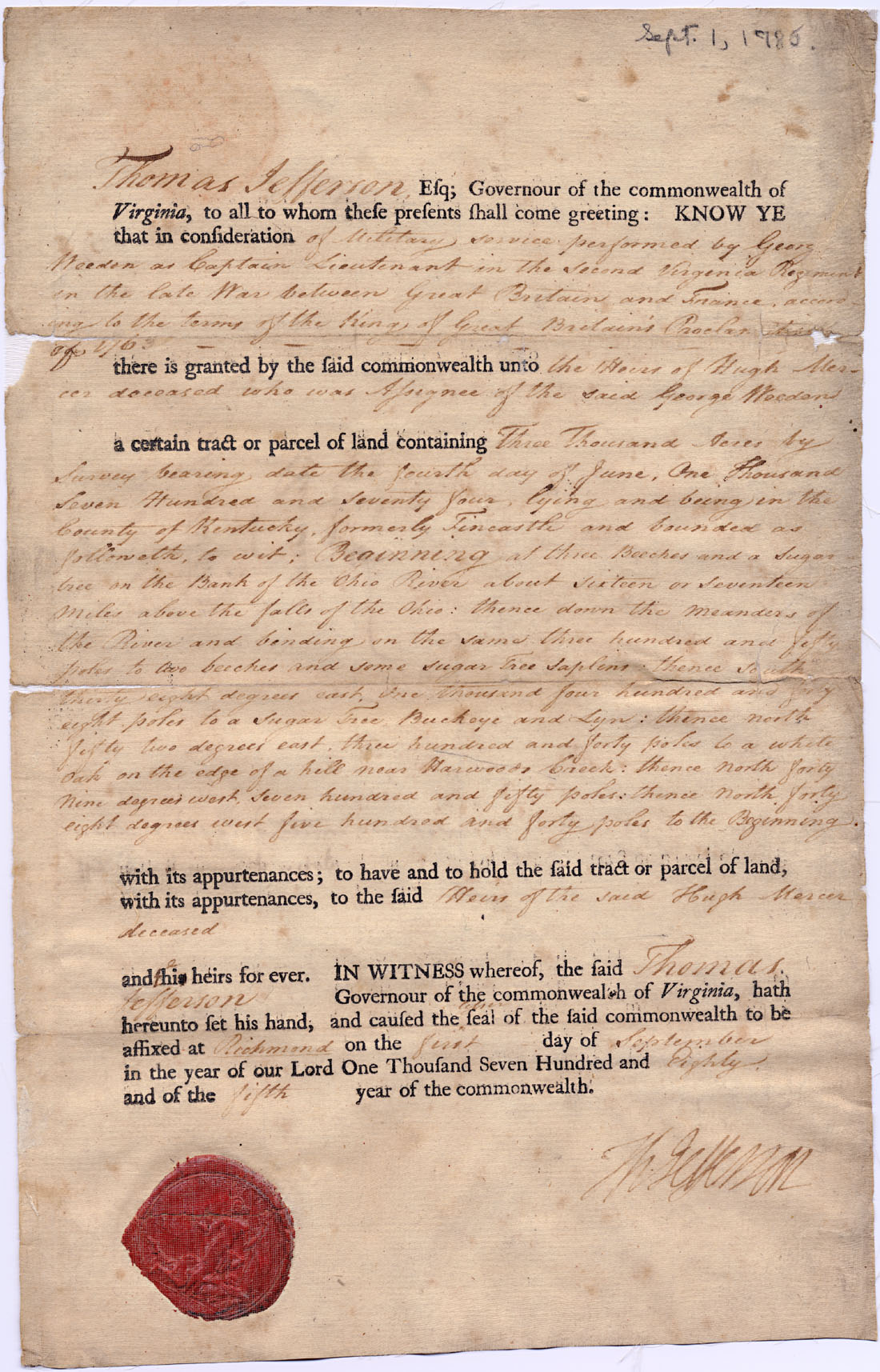
The Kentucky land grant to heirs of Mercer for military service of George Weedon during the French and Indian War signed by then Virginia governor Thomas Jefferson in 1780

The French and Indian War broke out in 1754, and Mercer joined the Pennsylvania Provincial Forces. In 1755, he served as a captain in General Edward Braddock's army in his failed attempt to take Fort Duquesne. He was wounded in the arm during the battle and left behind in the scramble to retreat, but he was able to rejoin his troops and continue to treat wounded soldiers. In March 1756, he was commissioned a captain in a Pennsylvania regiment and took command of Fort Shirley. He accompanied Lt. Col. John Armstrong in the Kittanning Expedition in September 1756.

Mercer was badly wounded in the fighting at Kittanning and separated from his unit. He trekked 100 miles (160 km) through the woods for 14 days, injured and with no supplies, before he "lay down, giving up all hopes of ever getting home." A "company of Cherokee Indians in kings pay" found him and carried him to Fort Lyttleton, where he recovered. In 1757, he was placed in charge of the garrison at Fort Morris in Shippensburg and promoted to Major. It was during this period that Mercer developed a lifelong friendship with George Washington.

Both Washington and Mercer served in the Forbes Expedition under British General John Forbes during the second attempt to capture Fort Duquesne. Forbes occupied the burned fort on 25 November 1758 and immediately ordered the construction of a new fortification to be named Fort Pitt, after British Secretary of State William Pitt the Elder. He also named the settlement "Pittsborough" between the rivers which today is Pittsburgh. Mercer built a temporary fort during construction of Fort Pitt, informally known as "Mercer's Fort". It was dismantled in 1760.

== American Revolution ==
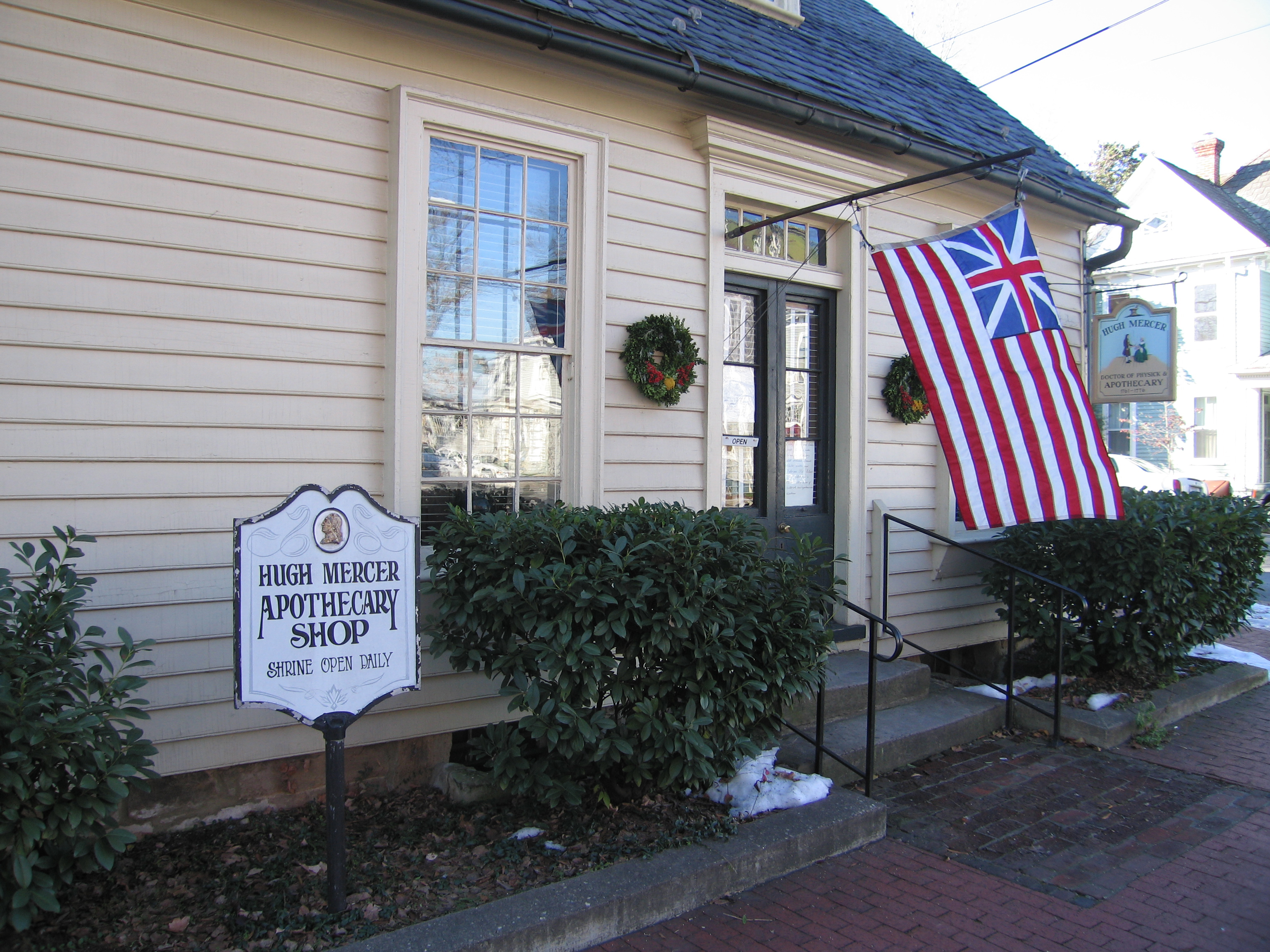
Hugh Mercer Apothecary in Fredericksburg, Virginia

Mercer moved to Fredericksburg, Virginia in 1760 after the French and Indian War to practice medicine, following George Washington's recommendation. There he befriended fellow Scottish expatriate John Paul Jones. Mercer became a noted businessman in town, buying land and involving himself in local trade. He married Isabella Gordon and they had five children: Ann Mercer Patton, John Mercer, William Mercer, George Weedon Mercer, and Hugh Tennant Mercer. He also opened a physician's apothecary and practice which is now a museum. In 1774, George Washington sold his childhood home Ferry Farm to Mercer, who wanted to make this prized land into a town where he and his family would settle for the remainder of his days.

During 1775, Mercer was a member of the Fredericksburg Committee of Safety, and he was one of the members of the Independent Company of the Town of Fredericksburg who sent a letter of concern to Colonel George Washington when the British removed gunpowder from the magazine at Williamsburg. In an August vote, Mercer was excluded from the elected leadership of the new regiments formed by the Virginia Convention because he was a "northern Briton", but he was elected Colonel of the Minute Men of Spotsylvania, King George, Stafford, and Caroline Counties on 12 September.

On November 17, 1775, Mercer was one of 21 members chosen for the Committee of Safety for Spotsylvania County. On January 10, 1776, he was appointed colonel to the 3rd Virginia Regiment of the Virginia Line, and George Weedon was appointed lieutenant colonel.

=== American Revolutionary War ===
On June 5, 1776, Mercer received a letter from the Second Continental Congress in Philadelphia, signed by John Hancock, appointing him brigadier-general in the Armies of the United Colonies and requesting him to report to headquarters in New York immediately.

Mercer was placed in charge of a large troop of Pennsylvania Militia stationed in Paulus Hook, New Jersey to protect from potential attack from British troops in Staten Island.

Before the New York City Campaign, Washington had ordered two forts built to repel the Royal Navy. On the New York side of the Hudson River, Fort Washington was constructed, and Mercer himself oversaw the building of the earthen fortification on the New Jersey side, named Fort Lee. The British captured Fort Washington on 16 November 1776, and the Americans abandoned Fort Lee four days later. The retreat to New Jersey became known as "the Crisis of the Revolution", because the enlistments of most of Washington's soldiers ended on New Year's Day 1777.

Mercer led a raid on Richmondtown, Staten Island on October 15, 1776, temporarily securing the town and taking as prisoners those inside the makeshift hospital of St. Andrew's Church, but was repelled back to New Jersey, releasing the prisoners and causing numerous British casualties in the process.

Some historical accounts credit Mercer with the suggestion for George Washington's crossing of the Delaware River, which resulted in a surprise attack on the Hessians at the Battle of Trenton on December 26, 1776. The victory at Trenton (and a small monetary bonus) made Washington's men agree to a ten-day extension to their enlistment. When Washington decided to face off with Cornwallis during the Second Battle of Trenton on January 2, 1777, Mercer was given a major role in the defense of the city.

=== Death ===
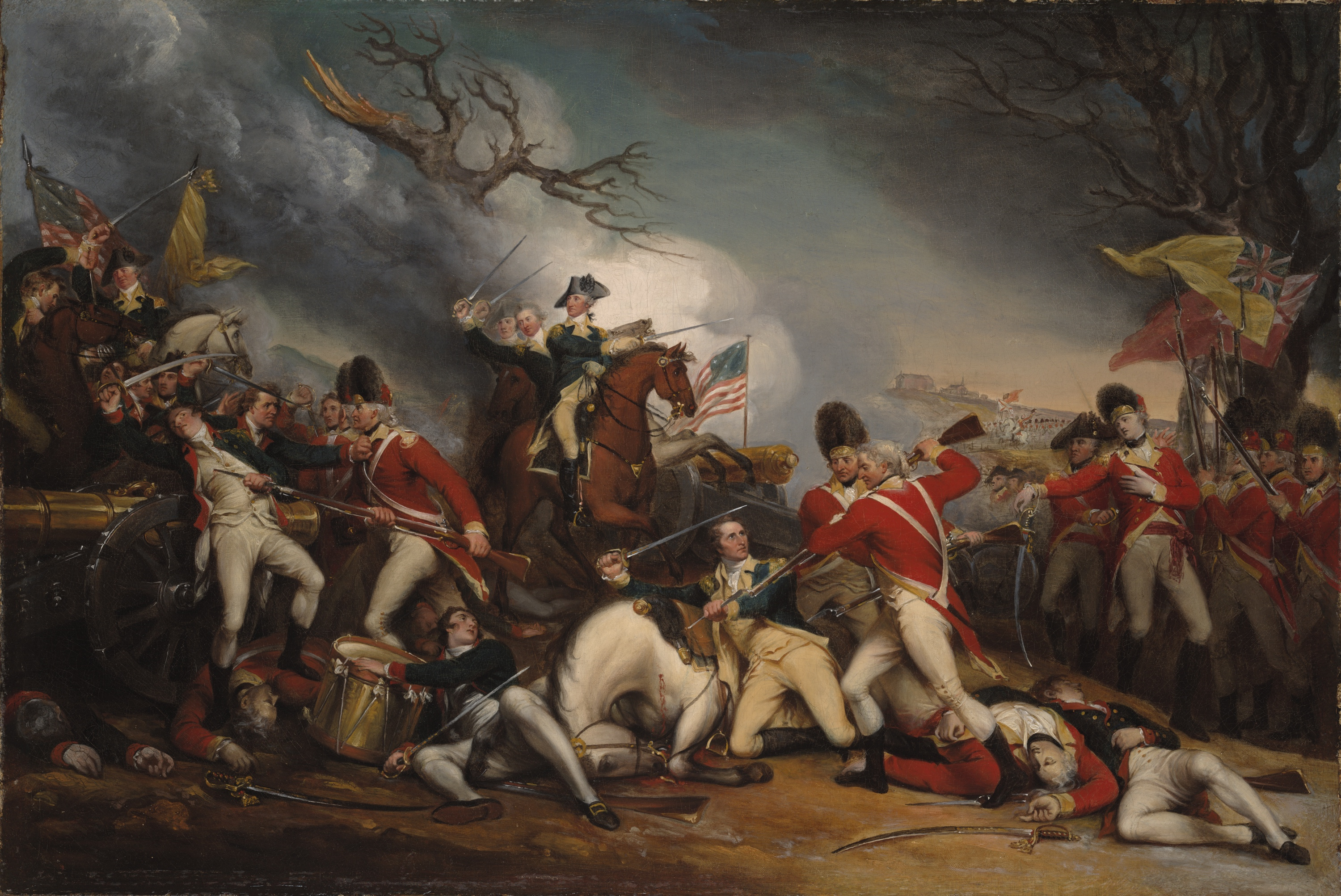
The Death of General Mercer at the Battle of Princeton, January 3, 1777, a portrait by John Trumbull featuring Mercer's death and George Washington on the horse

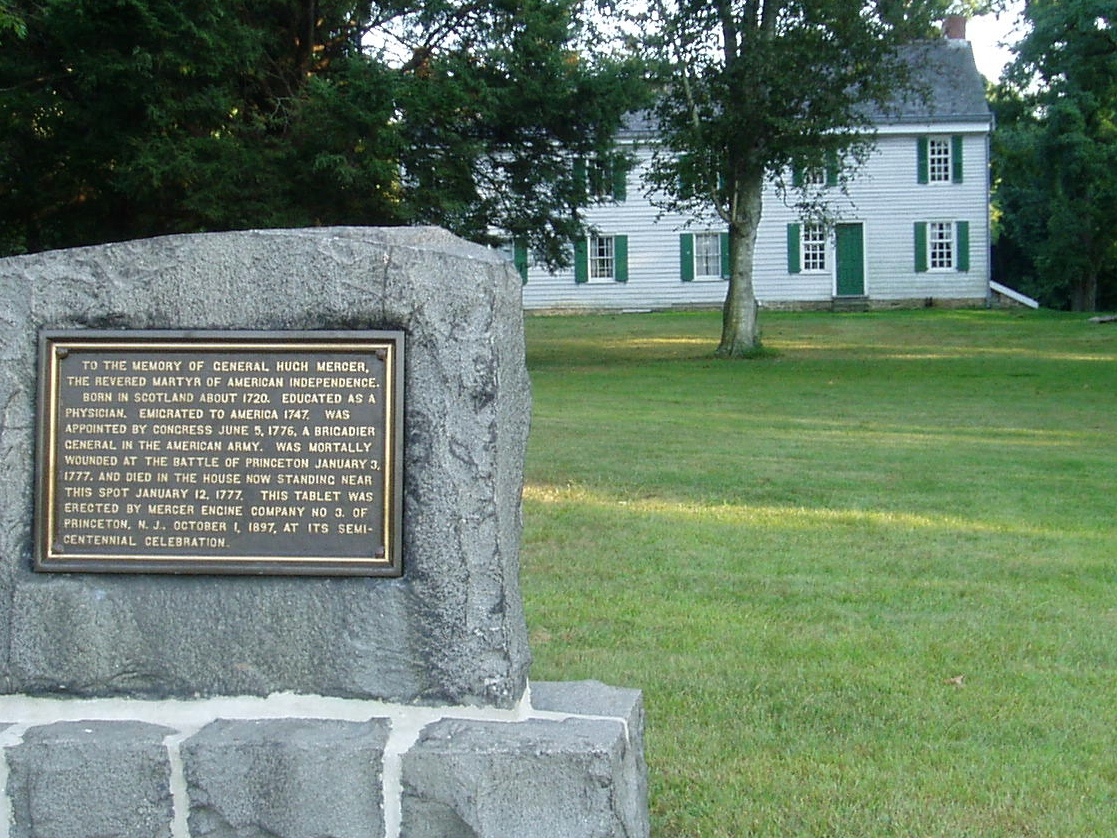
Mercer Memorial at the Thomas Clarke House in Princeton, New Jersey, where Mercer was treated after being bayonetted by British troops at the Battle of Princeton

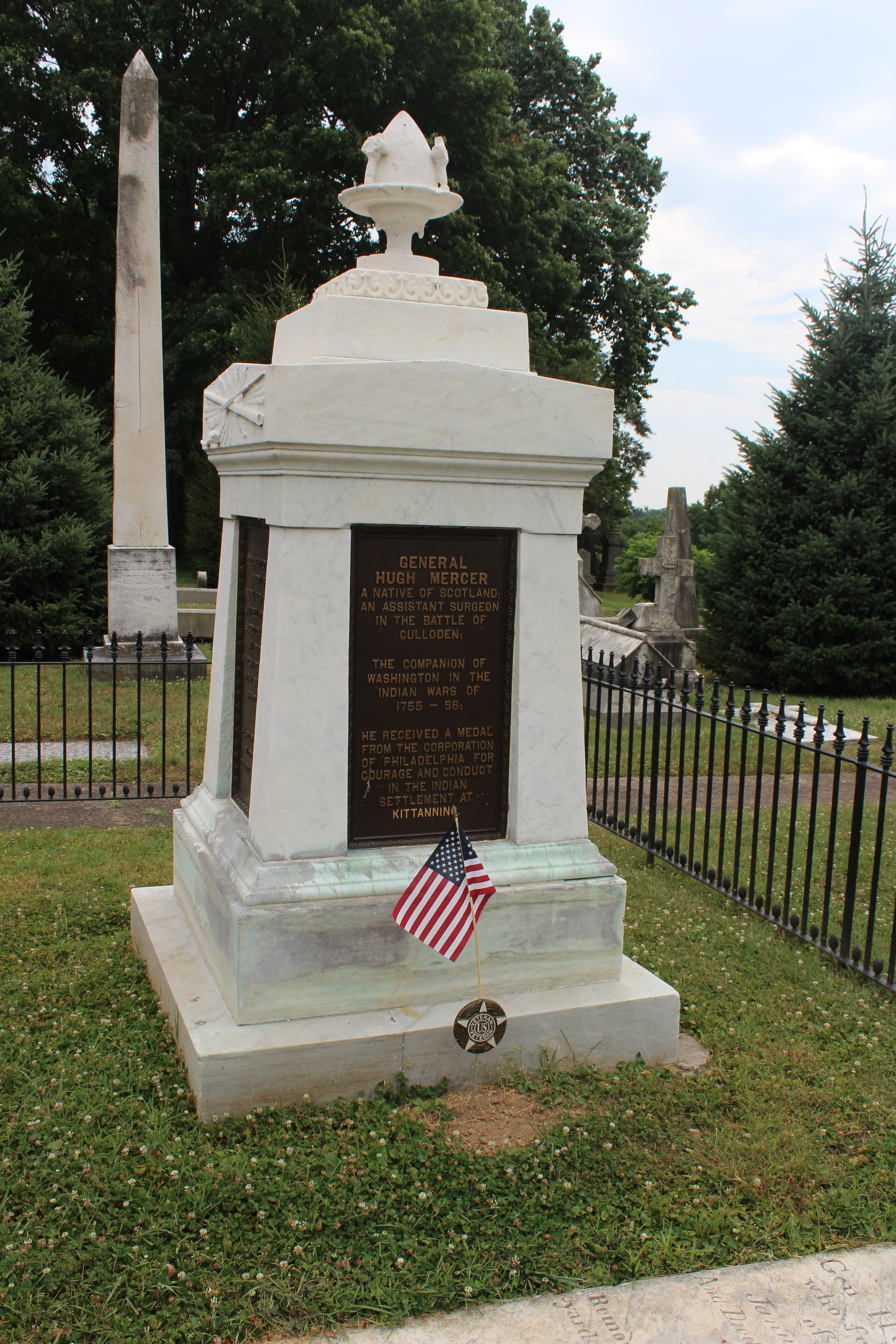
Mercer's remains were reinterred from Christ Church Burial Ground in Philadelphia to Laurel Hill Cemetery in 1840, where a monument funded by the Saint Andrew's Society marks his gravesite.

The next day, January 3, 1777, Washington's army was en route to the Battle of Princeton. While leading a vanguard of 350 soldiers, Mercer's brigade encountered two British regiments and a mounted unit. A fight broke out at an orchard grove and Mercer's horse was shot from under him. Getting to his feet, he was quickly surrounded by British troops who mistook him for George Washington and ordered him to surrender. Outnumbered, he drew his saber and began an unequal contest. He was finally beaten to the ground, bayoneted seven times, and left for dead.

When he learned of the British attack and saw some of Mercer's men in retreat, Washington himself entered the fray. Washington rallied Mercer's men and pushed back the British regiments, but Mercer had been left on the field to die with multiple bayonet wounds to his body and blows to his head. Legend has it that a beaten Mercer, with a bayonet still impaled in him, did not want to leave his men and the battle and was given a place to rest on a white oak tree's trunk, and those who remained with him stood their ground. The tree became known as "the Mercer Oak" and is the key element of the seal of Mercer County, New Jersey.

When he was found, Mercer was carried to the field hospital in the Thomas Clarke House, now a museum. at the eastern end of the battlefield. Benjamin Rush cared for Mercer and other wounded troops. Rush was assisted in caring for the wounded by Quakers.

Local Quakers continued to care for wounded troops from both Continental and British forces, after the Continental Army moved North. The Quaker meeting house is adjacent to the property now known as Princeton Battlefield State Park. Medical efforts were made by Rush to save Mercer, but he was mortally wounded and died nine days later, on January 12, 1777.

==== Interment ====
Mercer was initially interred in the Christ Church Burial Ground in Philadelphia. In 1840, he was reinterred in Laurel Hill Cemetery, including a memorial monument funded by the Saint Andrew's Society.

Because of Mercer's courage and sacrifice, Washington proceeded into Princeton, where he and the Continental Army defeated British forces in the Battle of Princeton. Washington then moved and quartered his forces in Morristown following the victory. Because of those victories, most of Washington's army re-enlisted, the French finally approved arms and supplies to the Americans, and a stunned Cornwallis pulled his forces back to New York to reassess the surprising military victories by Washington and his Continental Army. The crisis ended, demonstrating that Washington and his army had the means to fight, and British public support for continued engagement in the war began waning.

John Trumbull used Mercer's son, Hugh Jr., as a model for his portrait The Death of General Mercer at the Battle of Princeton, January 3, 1777.

A second portrait by Charles Willson Peale, Washington at the Battle of Princeton, January 3, 1777, displays Washington in the foreground with Hugh Mercer lying mortally wounded in the background, supported by Dr. Benjamin Rush and Major George Lewis holding the American flag. This portrait is the prize possession of Princeton University. Peale painted a version of Battle of Princeton, whose background shows a very indistinct portrait of Mercer being helped from the ground.

== Family ==
Succeeding generations of Mercer's family have distinguished themselves. Famous direct descendants of Hugh Mercer were his grandson Virginia governor John Mercer Patton, his sons Confederate Lt. Col Waller T. Patton and Col. George Smith Patton, who in turn was an ancestor of General George S. Patton, Jr. Other direct descendants include another grandson Confederate General Hugh Weedon Mercer (CSA), songwriter Johnny Mercer, and Sergeant Christopher Mercer Lowe of the U.S. Army.

Descendants of Hugh Mercer

Notable descendants of Hugh Mercer
Reverend William Mercer
Hugh Mercer
Hugh Tennant Weedon Mercer	Ann Gordon Mercer
Hugh Weedon Mercer	John M. Patton
George Anderson Mercer (1835-1907)	George S. Patton Sr.	Waller T. Patton
George Anderson Mercer (1869-1940)	George S. Patton Jr.
Johnny Mercer	Gen. George S. Patton

== In popular culture ==
- In the 2000 television film The Crossing, a dramatization of Washington's crossing of the Delaware and the Battle of Trenton, Mercer is played by Roger Rees.
- In the 2015 Broadway musical Hamilton, Mercer is referenced by Aaron Burr in the song "The Room Where It Happens": "Did ya hear the news about good old General Mercer? You know Clermont Street? They renamed it after him. The Mercer legacy is secure."
- In episode 3 of The Walking Dead: The Ones Who Live (2024), Mercer's story is retold and one of the characters, Major General Beale, possesses a sword said to have belonged to him.

== Namesakes ==
- Fort Mercer, located in Red Bank Battlefield of what is now the Borough of National Park, New Jersey
- Hugh Mercer Elementary School in Fredericksburg, Virginia
- Mercer County, Illinois
- Mercer County, Kentucky
- Mercer County, Missouri
- Mercer County, New Jersey
- Mercer County, Ohio
- Mercer County, Pennsylvania
- Mercer County, West Virginia
- Mercer Hall at the University of Mary Washington
- Mercer, Maine
- Mercer, Pennsylvania
- Mercer Street in Fredericksburg, Virginia
- Mercer Street in New York City
- Mercer Street in Trenton, New Jersey
- Mercers Bottom, West Virginia
- Mercersburg, Pennsylvania
- Mercerville, New Jersey
- Mercer, Wisconsin

== Gallery ==
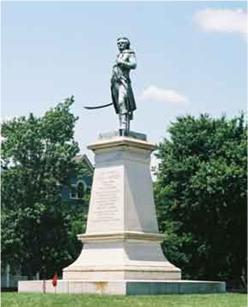
General Hugh Mercer Memorial Statue, Washington Avenue Historic District, Fredericksburg, Virginia

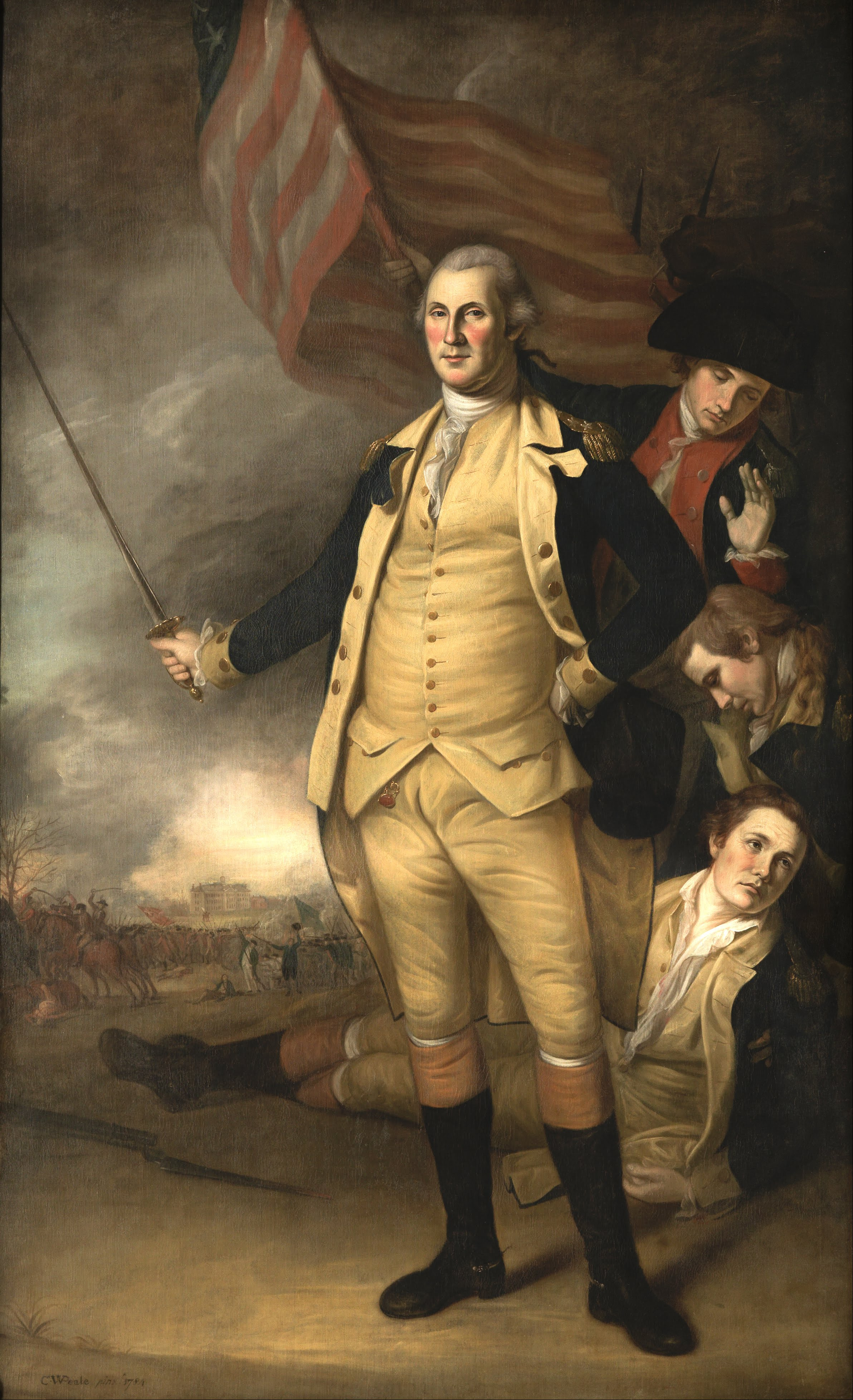
Charles Willson Peale portrait of Washington; Mercer; Rush and Lewis

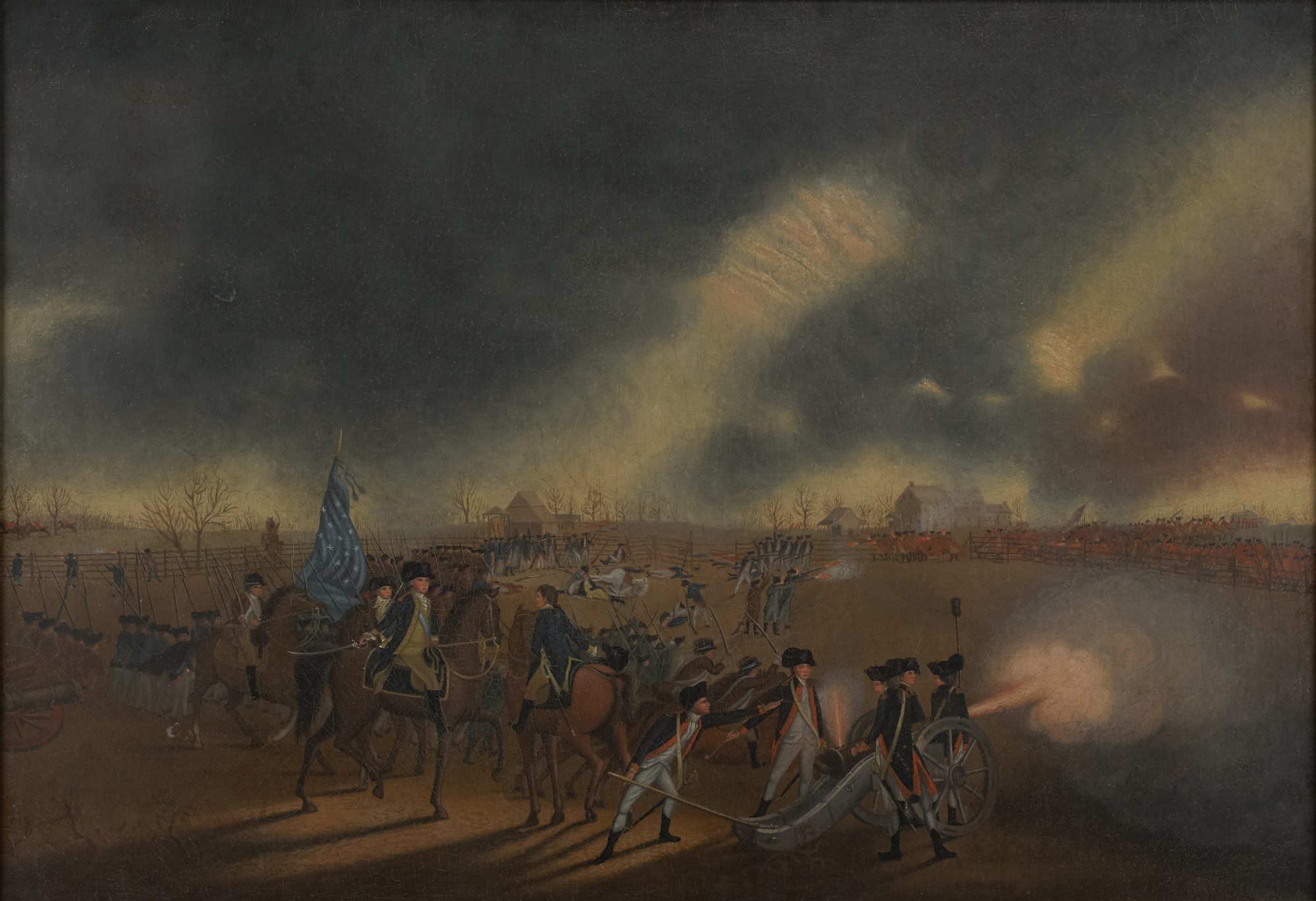
James Peale's The Battle of Princeton. background left can be seen Mercer beside his white horse
