= 21st Century Newspapers =

American newspaper company

21st Century Newspapers, Frank Shepherd
- Industry: Publishing
- Founded: 1995-2005
- Founder: Frank Homer Shepherd; Goldman Sachs Alternatives; Kelso & Company
- Headquarters: Pontiac, Michigan, United States
- Area served: Michigan
- Key people: Frank Homer Shepherd, Chairman and CEO; Doug Haensel, President and COO
- Products: Newspapers, 129 newspaper titles including weeklies and dailies
- Revenue: $175,000,000
- Net income: $35,000,000
- Subsidiaries: Heritage Newspapers

21st Century Newspapers was a corporation owning newspapers in the state of Michigan and based in Pontiac, Michigan, and founded in 1995.

== History ==
Frank Shepherd was born December 20, 1941, to Velma J.(Johnston) and Homer F. Shepherd in Port Huron, Michigan. Shepherd owned 21st Century Newspapers' and his first acquisitions were The Oakland Press and The Macomb Daily and The Royal Oak Tribune on August 21, 1997. They were purchased from The Walt Disney Company in Burbank, California. 21st Century under Frank Shepherd, president, chairman, and CEO, began a buying spree that eventually ended with approx. 129 newspaper titles. The company also acquired newspaper assets of Brill Media Company(purchased out of bankruptcy) in August 2002 including Morning Sun daily newspaper in Mt. Pleasant, Michigan, and newspapers in Traverse City, Charlevoix, Gaylord, East Jordan, Elk Rapids, Central Lake, Bellaire and Tawas City and other communities in central and northern Michigan. In addition, newspapers in "Downriver Detroit" were also purchased including newspapers in Wyandotte, Southgate, Dearborn, Lincoln Park, Melvindale, Allen Park, Taylor and Trenton In September 2002, Booth Newspapers acquired 21st Century Newspapers Suburban Flint Newspaper Group which has nine local papers: The Clio Messenger, The Davison Flagstaff, The Fenton Press, The Grand Blanc News, Flint Township News, The Flushing Observer, The Holly Press, The Suburban Burton, and Swartz Creek News and included Suburban Flint shopper. All of which became part of the Flint Journal as the Community Newspapers. on August 21, 2005, 21st Century was acquired by Journal Register Company.

== Assets ==
- Oakland Press
- The Macomb Daily
- Daily Tribune, Royal Oak
- Morning Sun, Mount Pleasant

It has approximately 120 other newspaper titles. In addition, the acquiring company purchased The Greater Detroit Newspaper Network. This 21st Century Company operated as the major group selling arm of 21st Century Newspapers. They generated approx. $25. million of annual profit by selling to national companies with most revenue coming from pre-printed inserts. The sale of 21st Century Newspapers in August 2005 was the largest newspaper sales by dollar volume in the US for the year 2005. Shepherd remained a consultant for the purchasing company for a short period, then left and joined another newspaper company's Board of Directors. In 2012, he finally retired to Charlevoix, Michigan, where he still resides. He started a township newspaper in 2018 and it still is published monthly and has a website. Shepherd began his newspaper career in Port Huron, Michigan, as a carrier boy for The Port Huron Times Herald, owned by the "Weil Family". He rose to become Classified Manager, and then the company purchased a weekly Utica Sentinel in Utica, Michigan. Shepherd became General Manager and turned the weekly into a daily newspaper, The Daily Sentinel. It was sold to Gannett in the late 1960's. Shepherd previously worked for Scripps Howard Newspapers in Cincinnati, Ohio as VP of Operations from 1983 until 1991. He was recruited by Stauffer Communications in 1991 as President and CEO and a member of The Board of Directors. Stauffer owned 29 daily newspapers, 9 television stations, and 4 radio stations, as well as several magazines. Shepherd improved the finances of Stauffer dramatically and then sold Stauffer to Morris Communications, headed by Billy Morris of Augusta, Georgia, for $245 million . Previously, Shepherd also worked for Panax Corporation of East Lansing, Michigan, and was a member of their Board of Directors. He joined the company in 1968 and headed the sale of the company, in part to Rupert Murdock(Texas newspapers) in August 1980. Shepherd then moved to Houston, Texas where he founded the book publishing company, Pioneer Publishing Company. He and his wife also attended classes to become Travel Agents. They bought into Action World Travel in Woodlands, Texas. He sold the book publishing company to his partner and took a consulting job with a California publishing company headed by Charles Morris of Morris Publishing in Savannah, Georgia. After the consulting agreement, Shepherd joined Scripps Howard in Cincinnati as VP of Newspaper Operations, where he stayed from 1982 until 1992. His career spanned the 50s through the 2000s. From hot-metal days until offset and heat set printing. He mastered all 3 processes, but empire-building, buying, building, and selling, was his forte. He was a gambler who rarely lost! His last venture was 21st Century Newspapers, Inc. which employed over 2,000 employees. He was considered an early pioneer in suburban journalism and a leader in "clustering" suburban newspapers into shared printing, sales, and accounting services. He studied rotogravure printing with Axel-Springer in Hamburg, Germany and built printing plants in South Africa from 1975 to 1978 at the behest of the South African Gov't.

Shepherd sold 21st Century in August 2005 for $415,000,000 cash, then retired to Charlevoix, Michigan. He is married to the former Beth Louise Lyons(Shepherd) for the past 44 years. His newspaper career spanned 5 decades, from the early 1960's until 2005. Shepherd has a son, Jim Shepherd, a successful executive with Snapchat. Jim was born in Newhall, California, and lives in Beverley Hills, California. Jim was an outstanding basketball for the Charlevoix Rayder(Charlevoix, Michigan) team who lost to the State Champs two years in a row. Jim held the High School "Breslin Center"(Michigan State University) record for the most 3-point baskets in one game(9) and was an MVP player at Wesleyan University in Middletown, Conn.

Shepherd was previously married and divorced in 1978. He fathered five children, Melanie, Mark, Kim, Chris, and Kathy, from that previous marriage to Chere Marie Denczek, daughter of Joseph and Lorraine Denczek of Port Huron, Michigan.

Shepherd says he will be cremated and scattered to the winds upon this death.
