= The Accidental Teacher =

Book by Annie Lubliner Lehmann

The Accidental Teacher: Life Lessons from My Silent Son
- First edition
- Author: Annie Lubliner Lehmann
- Language: English
- Subject: Autism
- Genre: Non-fiction
- Publisher: The University of Michigan Press
- Publication date: 2008 (self-published) / 2009
- Publication place: United States
- Media type: Paperback
- Pages: 184
- ISBN: 978-0-472-05074-1

The Accidental Teacher: Life Lessons from My Silent Son is an autism memoir by Annie Lubliner Lehmann. It was originally self-published in 2008, and then published in 2009 by The University of Michigan Press. It is a general overview of the author's life with her family, including her autistic eldest son Jonah.

== Background and content ==
The memoir recounts Lehmann's experiences navigating diagnosis, education and caregiving, and the impact of disability on family life. In a 2010 feature about the University of Michigan Press Open Text Project, AnnArbor.com described the book as an "honest look" at raising a child who remains severely impaired into adulthood and highlighted the author's focus on sharing a parental perspective for teachers and professionals working with autistic people.

== Reception ==
The book has been reviewed by The Detroit News in 2008.

In 2010, the Los Angeles Times discussed the book in the context of autism memoirs and the University of Michigan Press Open Text Project, noting the project's temporary free online access and paragraph-by-paragraph commenting format.

== See also ==
- Autism
- Autistic people
- Autism spectrum disorders in the media
