= Ann Arbor Business Review =

Business magazine

The Ann Arbor Business Review was a weekly business journal published in Ann Arbor, Michigan. The publication, formerly distributed in a tab format and then primarily on-line, covered business news in the Washtenaw County and Livingston County areas.

== History and profile ==
The publication started as Business Direct Weekly in January 2003 and became Business Review Washtenaw/Livingston in late 2004. It changed names again in 2005, becoming the Ann Arbor Business Review.

Owned by Advance Publications, it had the same parent company as The Ann Arbor News, a daily newspaper. The two publications shared a publisher but were editorially independent. The Ann Arbor Business Review drew attention in 2005 when it became the first publication to report that Google was making plans to move its AdWords headquarters to Ann Arbor.

The business journal was part of the Michigan Business Review network, which also included the Novi-based Oakland Business Review and the Kalamazoo-based Western Michigan Business Review. Following the folding of the Ann Arbor News in July 2009 as a daily printed paper, the Ann Arbor Business Review ceased its regular printed offering on August 13 and joined the News as a primarily on-line publication, sharing the AnnArbor.com website and appearing in the AnnArbor.com print edition each Sunday.
