= Newspaper endorsements in the 2008 United States presidential election =

During the 2008 United States presidential election, newspapers, magazines, and other publications made general election endorsements. As of November 4, 2008, Barack Obama had received more than twice as many publication endorsements as John McCain; in terms of circulation, the ratio was more than 3 to 1, according to the detailed tables below.

According to Editor & Publisher magazine, as of November 3, 2008, there were 273 newspapers endorsing Barack Obama compared to 172 for John McCain. By comparison, the magazine reported that before election day in 2004, John Kerry received 213 endorsements compared to 205 for George W. Bush.

UWIRE, in its Presidential Scorecard, reported that Barack Obama led John McCain by 86 to 2 in college newspaper endorsements, as of November 4.

The Association of Alternative Newsweeklies reported that Barack Obama led John McCain by 57 to 0 in endorsements among its 123 member newspapers as of October 31, 2008.

Cumulative endorsements As of 4 November 2008
Publications	Obama		McCain	
Publications	Publications	Circulation	Publications	Circulation
Daily newspapers	296	30,580,459	180	11,917,481
Weekly newspapers	111	3,951,905	32	333,392
College newspapers	78	768,000	2	16,479
Magazines and other	10	5,226,633	1	178,780
Switched parties from 2004	66		11	
Total	495	40,526,997	215	12,446,132

== Not endorsing ==
The following explicitly chose not to endorse any candidate.

- Abilene Reporter News (Texas, circulation 36,802) discontinued endorsing presidential candidates as a matter of policy in 2004.
- Ann Arbor News (Michigan, circulation 59,997) endorsed George W. Bush in 2004.
- Ashland Daily Press (Wisconsin, circulation 7,252) does not endorse candidates as a matter of policy.
- Brownsville Herald (Texas, circulation 15,517)
- Carlisle Sentinel (Pennsylvania, circulation 15,334) endorsed George W. Bush in 2004.
- Colorado Springs Gazette (Colorado, circulation 109,603) did not endorse any candidate in 2004.
- Deseret News (Salt Lake City) (Utah, circulation 75,614) does not endorse candidates as a matter of policy.
- East Tennessean (East Tenn. Univ.) (Tennessee, circulation 6,000)
- Everett Herald (Washington, circulation 52,226) endorsed John Kerry in 2004.
- Florida Times-Union (Jacksonville) (Florida, circulation 201,352) endorsed George W. Bush in 2004.
- Flyer News (Univ. of Dayton) (Ohio, circulation 5,000)
- The News-Press (Fort Myers) (Florida, circulation 84,022)
- Free Lance-Star (Fredericksburg) (Virginia, circulation 50,480) endorsed George W. Bush in 2004.
- Fond du Lac Reporter (Wisconsin, circulation 16,469) did not endorse any candidate in 2004.
- Harlingen Valley Morning Star (Texas, circulation 20,403)
- Honolulu Advertiser (Hawaii, circulation 142,401) endorsed John Kerry in 2004.
- Houma Courier (Louisiana, circulation 26,528)
- Huntsville Times (Alabama, circulation 71,032)
- Indianapolis Star (Indiana, circulation 255,303) endorsed George W. Bush in 2004.
- Kalamazoo Gazette (Michigan, circulation 64,198) endorsed George W. Bush in 2004.
- Lima News (Ohio, circulation 39,450)
- Loyola Phoenix (Loyola Univ.) (Illinois)
- Manitowoc Herald Times Reporter (Wisconsin, circulation 14,243) endorsed George W. Bush in 2004.
- Marietta Register (Ohio, free weekly circulation 10,000)
- Marysville Appeal-Democrat (California, circulation 22,911)
- Morning Call (Allentown, Pennsylvania) endorsed John Kerry in 2004.
- Mountain Home News (Boise) (Idaho, weekly circulation 4,000)
- The New Hampshire (Univ. of New Hampshire) (New Hampshire, circulation 6,000)
- Northeast Mississippi Daily Journal (Tupelo) (Mississippi, circulation 36,929)
- Oshkosh Northwestern (Wisconsin, circulation 19,506) endorsed George W. Bush in 2004.
- Port Huron Times Herald (Michigan, circulation 32,766) endorsed John Kerry in 2004.
- Redding Record Searchlight (California, circulation 35,004)
- Roanoke Times (Virginia, circulation 99,171) endorsed John Kerry in 2004.
- Rocky Mount Telegram (North Carolina, circulation 15,880)
- Rocky Mountain News (Denver) (Colorado, circulation 490,043) endorsed George W. Bush in 2004.
- Roseburg News-Review (Oregon, circulation 19,290) endorsed George W. Bush in 2004
- St. Paul Pioneer Press (Minnesota, circulation 191,591) endorsed George W. Bush in 2004.
- Springfield News-Leader (Missouri, circulation 54,307)
- Superior Daily Telegram (Wisconsin, circulation 7,550) endorsed George W. Bush in 2004.
- Topeka Capital-Journal (Kansas, circulation 53,180)
- Tucson Citizen (Arizona, circulation 19,851) did not endorse any candidate in 2004.
- Victoria Advocate (Texas, circulation 34,604)
- Virginian Pilot (Norfolk) (Virginia, circulation 200,457) endorsed John Kerry in 2004.
- Waco Tribune-Herald (Texas, circulation 42,914) Endorsed John Kerry in 2004.

== See also ==
- Newspaper endorsements in the United States presidential primaries
