= Hit N Move =

American sporting goods manufacturer

Hit N Move is an American sporting goods manufacturer that produces boxing equipment, including gloves, headgear, and training gear. The company was founded by Ozhan Akcakaya and is headquartered in Alexandria, Virginia.

The brand has been noted in sports and business media for attempting to apply medical and biomechanical research to the design of boxing equipment, including impact dispersion, ergonomic hand positioning, and protective padding systems.

== History ==
Hit N Move was founded in the early 2020s by Ozhan Akcakaya, a medical professional with experience in the pharmaceutical industry who also participated in amateur boxing. According to Sports Business Journal, the company was established with the aim of incorporating sports science and medical research into boxing equipment design.

Industry commentary has described the brand as part of a group of newer boxing equipment manufacturers emphasizing ergonomics, structural balance, and visibility improvements in protective gear.
