= Saginaw Daily Courier =

American newspaper

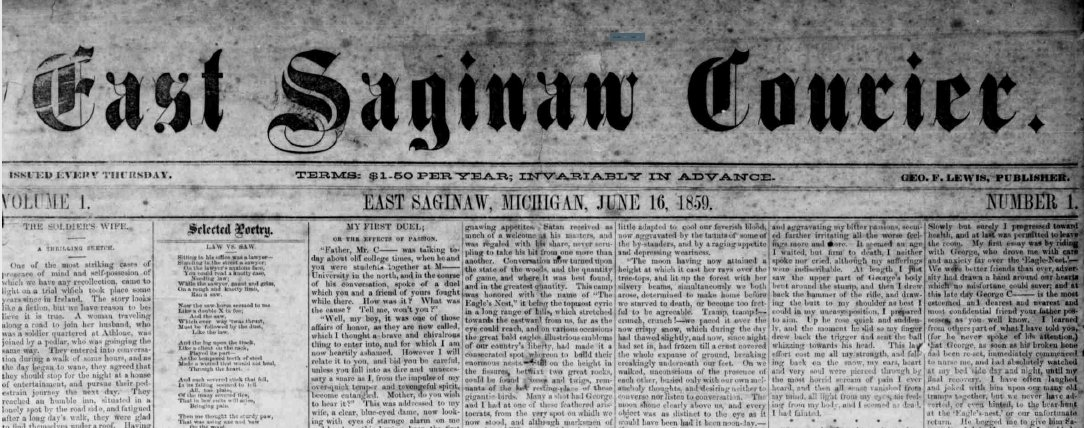
East Saginaw Courier newspaper, Volume 1 Number1, first issue published on June 16, 1859

The Saginaw Daily Courier was a newspaper published from 1868 to 1881 in Saginaw, Michigan. It has its roots with an earlier local newspaper called the East Saginaw Courier. Merging with other newspapers as time went on it eventually became the Saginaw News.

== History ==
The history starts with The East Saginaw Courier that was first published in June 1859 by George F. Lewis. It was printed in East Saginaw, Michigan, a city that no longer exists. The city was on the Saginaw River, located near the "thumb" region of Michigan. Lewis was the proprietor and first editor of the newspaper. It was at the beginning a four-page weekly publication. It came out on Thursdays. Lewis in 1861 sold his press equipment to Perry Joslin, proprietor of Saginaw Weekly Enterprise newspaper. The sale agreement was made so that Lewis could still use the press upon request. The East Saginaw Courier in 1863 updated and bought new printers. It was financed by Captain Lyon who then became a partner in the newspaper firm. Their central offices had moved around the city at least six times between 1859 and 1866.

The Saginaw Courier Company of East Saginaw in 1868 was publishing the Saginaw Daily Courier and at the same time as the weekly newspaper East Saginaw Courier. Lewis published both newspapers. The weekly newspaper was eventually phased out by 1881 and the two publications became The Saginaw Courier.
