= George Louis =

George Louis may refer to:

- George Louis, Prince of Nassau-Dillenburg (1618–1656)
- George Louis I, Count of Erbach-Erbach (1643–1693)
- George I of Great Britain (1660–1727), born Georg Ludwig or George Louis
- George Louis, Landgrave of Hesse-Darmstadt or Prince George of Hesse-Darmstadt (1669–1705)
- George Louis, Prince of Erbach-Schönberg (1903–1971)

== See also ==
- George Lewis (disambiguation)
