= Hugh Mercer Apothecary =

- U.S. Historic district – Contributing property
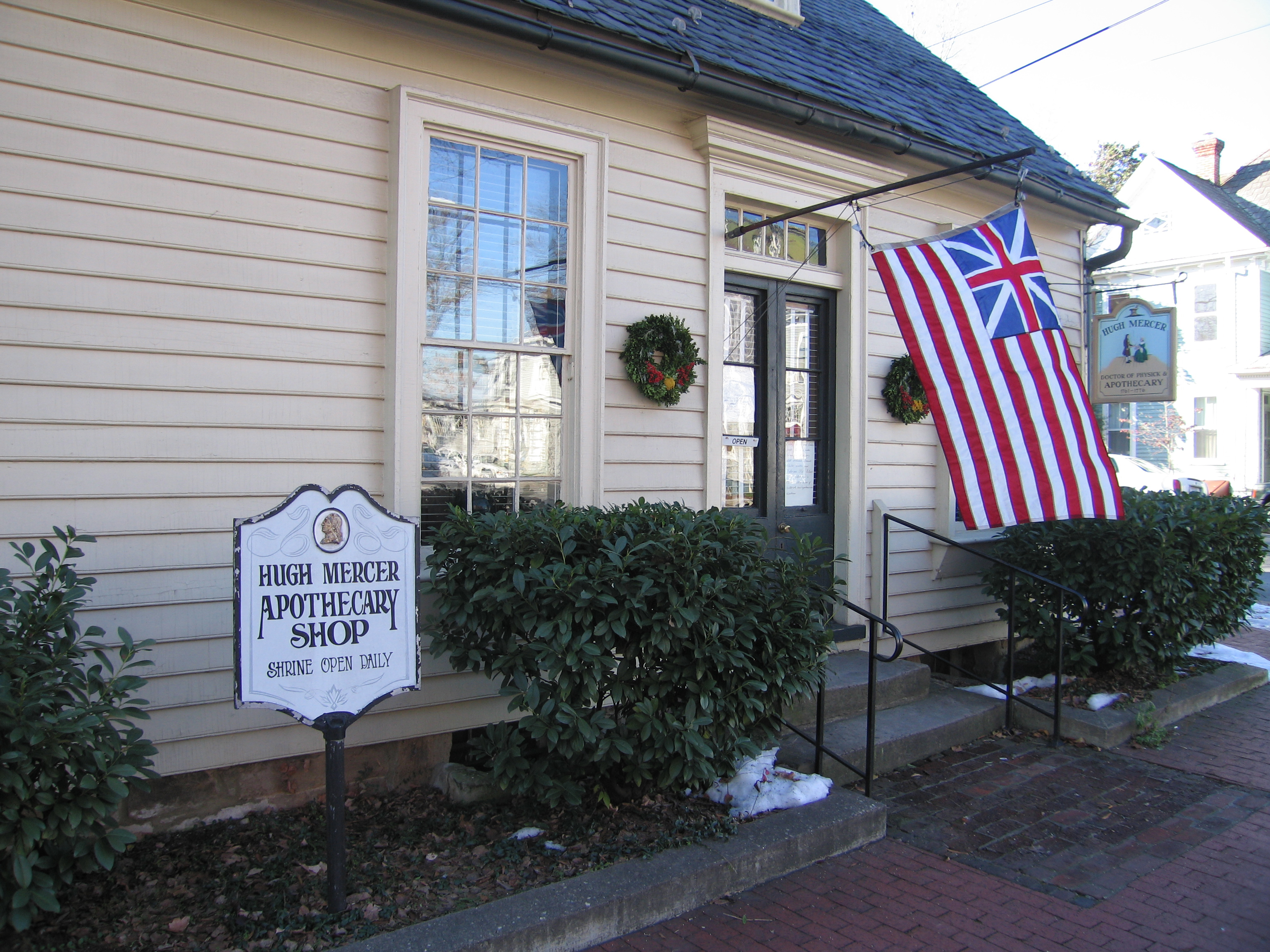
- Hugh Mercer Apothecary Shop

- Location within Northern Virginia Location within Virginia Location within the United States
- Location: 1020 Caroline Street, Fredericksburg, Virginia
- Coordinates: 38°18′0″N 77°28′13″W
- Part of: Fredericksburg Historic District (ID71001053)
- Designated CP: September 22, 1971

Hugh Mercer Apothecary was founded by Hugh Mercer in the mid-18th century. Mercer was a doctor who fled Scotland after the Battle of Culloden. He travelled to Pennsylvania, where he met Colonel George Washington during the French and Indian War and later moved to Fredericksburg, Virginia on Washington's advice to practice medicine and operate an apothecary.

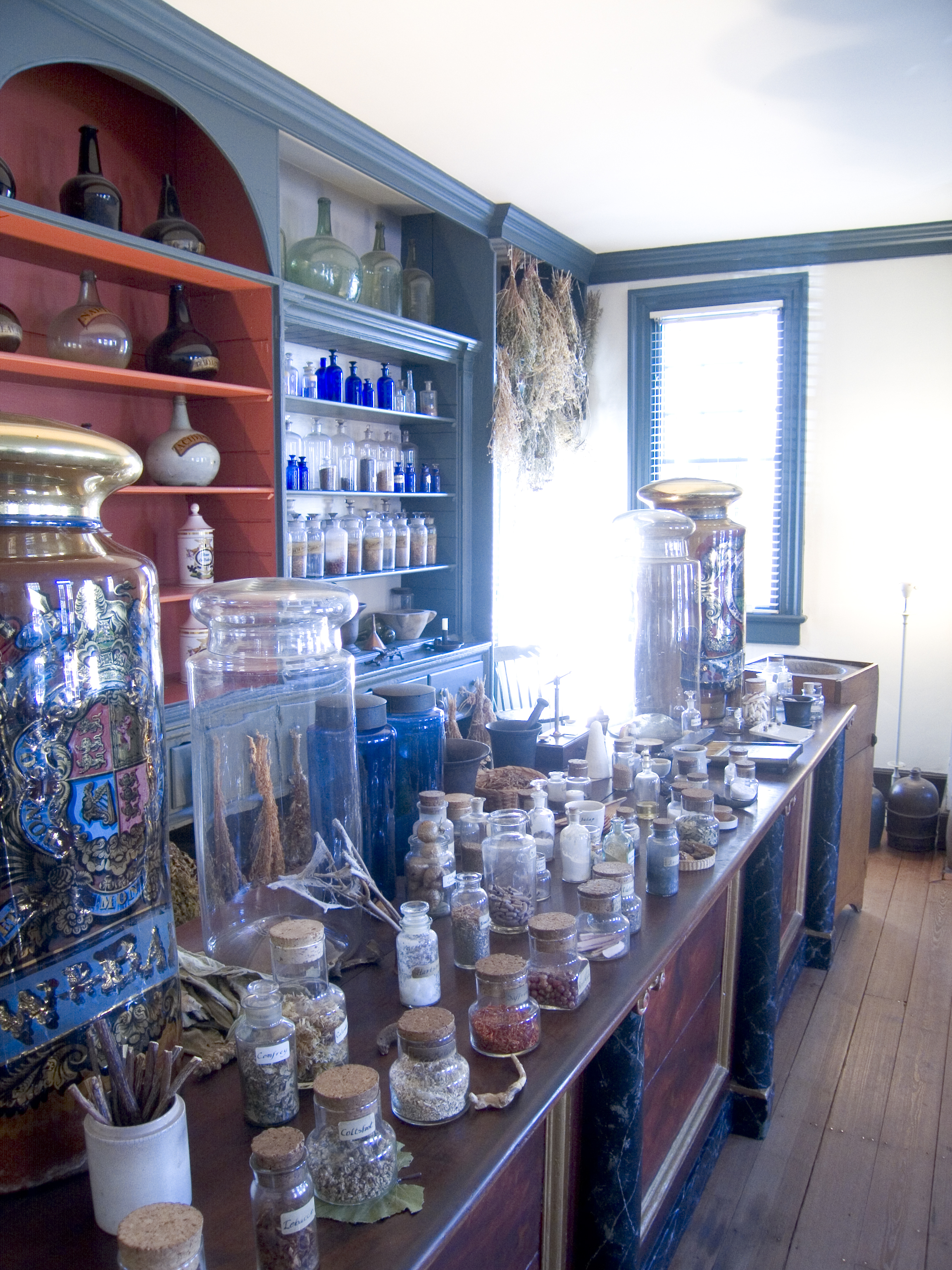

The building that housed the apothecary has been restored by Preservation Virginia to demonstrate 18th Century medical treatments. It also includes a small exhibit on Mercer's life and contributions to the American Revolutionary War.

Preservation Virginia signed an agreement in 2012 passing ownership to the "Washington Heritage Museums" group beginning in 2013. The museum is located at 1020 Caroline Street in Fredericksburg, Virginia.
