= MLive Media Group =

Media company of Grand Rapids, Michigan, founded 1893

- Formerly: Booth Newspapers
- Type: Division
- Industry: Publishing
- Founded: 1893; 133 years ago
- Founder: George Gough Booth and his 2 brothers
- Headquarters: Grand Rapids, Michigan, United States
- Area served: Michigan
- Key people: Timothy D. Gruber (president)
- Products: MLive.com; The Ann Arbor News; The Bay City Times; The Flint Journal; The Grand Rapids Press; Jackson Citizen Patriot; Kalamazoo Gazette; Muskegon Chronicle; The Saginaw News; Advance Newspapers
- Parent: Advance Publications
- Website: mlivemediagroup.com

MLive Media Group (previously as Booth Newspapers and Booth Michigan) is a media group that produces newspapers for the state of Michigan, headquartered in Grand Rapids, Michigan. Founded by George Gough Booth with his two brothers, Booth Newspapers was sold to Advance Publications, a Samuel I. Newhouse property, in 1976.

MLive Media Group newspaper publications include The Ann Arbor News, The Bay City Times, The Flint Journal, The Grand Rapids Press, Jackson Citizen Patriot, Kalamazoo Gazette, Muskegon Chronicle, The Saginaw News, and Advance Newspapers. All of Advance Publications' Michigan content is published on Mlive.com.

== History ==
=== Early history ===
Booth Newspapers was founded by George Gough Booth and his brothers in 1893 and was a media company based in Grand Rapids, Michigan. In 1976, Samuel Irving Newhouse Sr. of Advance Publications acquired Booth Newspapers for $305 million, equivalent of $1.45 billion. It was the highest price paid in American newspaper history at the time.

The Herald Company, Inc. merged with Booth Newspapers, Inc. in July 1987.

In 1997, MLive.com was launched that contained content from Booth's eight newspapers, while the Ann Arbor Times had separated their website, known as AnnArbor.com until 2013.

In September 2002, Booth Newspapers acquired 21st Century Newspapers, Inc.'s Heritage Newspapers' Suburban Flint Newspaper Group which had nine local papers: Clio Messenger, Davison Flagstaff, Fenton Press, Grand Blanc News, Flint Township News, Flushing Observer, Holly Press, Suburban Burton, and Swartz Creek News, and included Suburban Flint Shopper. All of these operated with The Flint Journal as the Community Newspapers.

In December 2006, the Herald Company, Inc. merged with Advance Magazine Publisher, Inc. but continues to operate under the Booth Newspapers name in Michigan.

On November 3, 2008, the day before the 2008 presidential election, many copies of Booth newspapers were delivered inside a white advertising wrapper, paid for by the National Rifle Association, with "Defend Freedom, Defeat Obama" written across the outside. The bags were mostly reported with The Flint Journal, but there were also similar reports from customers of The Saginaw News and The Bay City Times. The Flint Journal posted a short apology on its website that stated that "The wrapper was supposed to be inserted into the newspaper." The Journal also told WJRT-TV, who also received a flood of calls about the incident, that there was "some miscommunication" with the paper carriers. The three papers mentioned endorsed Barack Obama for president.

On March 23, 2009, Booth Newspapers announced in The Ann Arbor News that it would end the paper's 174-year print run in July 2009, due to economic difficulties, and be replaced by AnnArbor.com, a daily web paper that will have a twice-weekly print edition. Also on this date, Booth announced that beginning June 1, 2009, The Bay City Times, The Saginaw News, and The Flint Journal would reduce publishing to three times a week (Thursday, Friday, and Sunday) while increasing their web presence; the three newspapers would add a Tuesday edition in March 2010, with The Bay City Times and The Saginaw News sharing an edition.

=== MLive consolidation ===
On February 2, 2012, Booth Newspapers split into two companies: MLive Media Group and Advance Central Services Michigan. MLive Group handles advertising and news for all newspapers and websites. Advance Central Services handles human resources, production, and distribution. At the same time, home delivery of Booth's remaining daily newspapers was reduced to Tuesdays, Thursdays, and Sundays with subscribers receiving e-editions on the other days on which they print.

Also in 2012, Mlive contracted with former WEYI-TV meteorologist Mark Torregrossa to run the website's weather section with the expectation of increasing the section's views from 900,000 to 1 million. Instead by 2014, the section received on average 5 million to 6 million page views with a high in January 2014 of 13 million.

In 2012, the former 21st Century Newspapers-owned papers in the Flint area had all ceased publication, although the Clio Messenger had stopped publishing two years prior.

In 2013 AnnArbor.com joined MLive Media Group, which was established in 2012 as the Michigan brand for Advance Publications. At that time, AnnArbor.com's web presence was integrated with the other Michigan properties under the MLive.com URL and the AnnArbor.com newspaper returned to its historical identity as The Ann Arbor News.

In 2019, a similar group of Booth/Advance/MLive-owned community newspapers in the Grand Rapids area, operating under the banner Advance Newspapers, also ceased publishing.

In March 2020, MLive Media Group announced Tim Gruber as the president and chief revenue officer.
