= George F. Lewis =

American journalist and newspaper owner

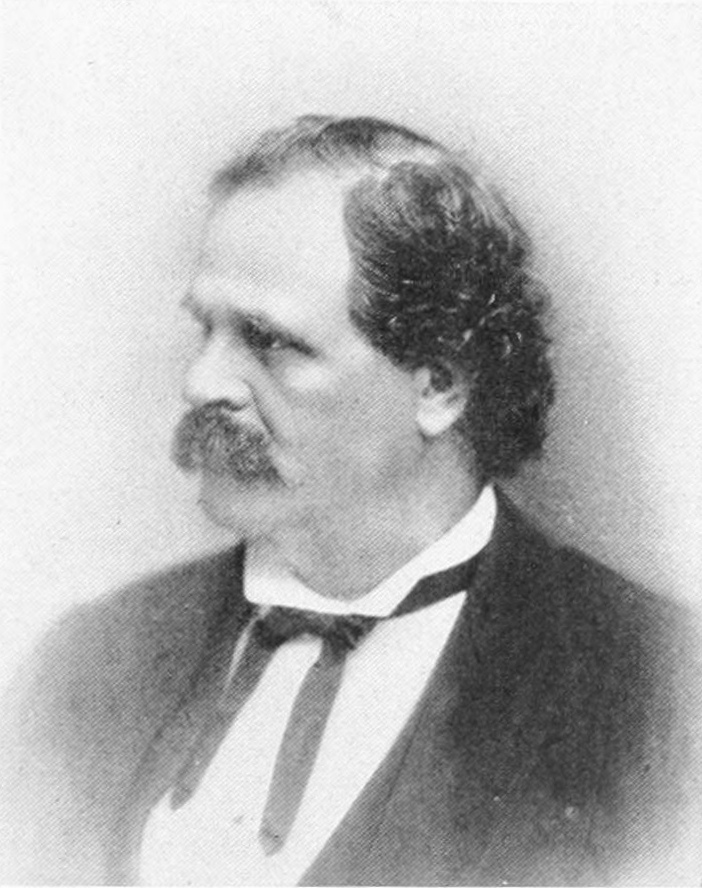
- Lewis, circa 1863

Mayor of Saginaw, Michigan
- In office 1877–1879
- Preceded by: Fred H. Potter
- Succeeded by: Lyman W. Bliss

Personal details
- Born: June 7, 1828; Harvard, Massachusetts, US
- Died: May 30, 1890 (aged 61); Saginaw, Michigan, US
- Occupation: journalist, businessman
- Known for: journalism and Michigan historian

George F. Lewis (June 7, 1828 – May 30, 1890) was a nineteenth-century American journalist and proprietor of several newspapers. He helped in the printing of the first time news of presidential election results were published. He was involved in determining there was copper ore in Michigan to be mined. He was also mayor of Saginaw, Michigan.

== Early life ==
Lewis was born in Harvard, Massachusetts, on June 7, 1828. He had a sister and a brother. In 1835, Lewis moved with his family to Mount Clemens, Michigan.

== Business career ==
Lewis was a newspaper delivery person for the Mt. Clemens Patriot when he was ten years old. As a pioneer journalist, he helped set the printing of the Macomb Statesman newspaper in 1838, when it was first published at the printing office of John N. Ingersoll, the proprietor and editor.

In 1845, when he was seventeen years old, Lewis made a four-week trip to the Lake Superior region of the Upper Peninsula of Michigan with General John Stockton, a government mineral agent. On the return trip, Lewis took specimens of copper ore to Boston and New York City for examination of value. Lewis again traveled to Upper Michigan in mid-1847 to obtain samples of copper ore. On his return trip to New York City he met Horace Greeley of the New-York Tribune on journalism matters.

Lewis returned to Copper Harbor in Michigan's Lake Superior region in early 1847 and remained there until the November. When he returned, Thomas M Perry of the Mt. Clemens Patriot hired him as an apprentice journalist. Lewis stayed with Perry until mid-1848, when he took a job in July at the Detroit Daily Commercial Bulletin, a newspaper that had started two months earlier. Lewis helped set up the printing of the news of the presidential election victory of General Zachary Taylor in 1848 – the first time news of a presidential win had been transmitted by telegraph. Lewis worked in Michigan's government printing office at the state capital for Munger & Pattison during the winter of 1848 to 1849. He started the weekly newspaper Macomb County Herald in 1849 and worked there until 1851.

Lewis started the Port Huron Commercial newspaper in 1851, and continued publishing it until April 1855. He bought the Peninsular Advocate newspaper of Mt. Clemens in September of that year; the weekly newspaper was published under his complete control until 1863, when he partnered with Major E. W. Lyon in its publication and their partnership continued until 1867. That year, B. M. Thompson became another partner and the three of them ran the publication. The Saginaw Daily Courier was then started in March 1868 by Lewis, Lyon, Thompson and Joseph Leeman. In December, Thompson bought out all the partners of the newspaper and he subsequently sold it to the Saginaw Enterprise Publishing Company.

Lewis started several other Michigan newspapers including the Saginairian in 1869, the Mt Pleasant Journal in 1880, and the Bay City Daily Morning Call in 1881.

== Personal life ==
Lewis was one of the Deputy Marshals of Macomb County, Michigan, when he took the census of eight towns in 1850. He had helped his father take the 1845 Michigan census so he had experience in this task.

Lewis was a historian of the Saginaw Valley, Michigan, and served as mayor of Saginaw from 1877 to 1879. He died in Saginaw of heart disease on May 30, 1890.
