= Barry Edmonds =

American photojournalist

Barry Edmonds (July 18, 1931 - July 21, 1982) was a United States photojournalist.

The work of photographer Barry Edmonds started in the Flint Journal beginning in 1955. For 27 years, Edmonds worked at the paper. Edmonds was named the Michigan Press Photographer of the Year four times in the 1960s, more than any other photographer at the time. He was the only Flint Journal photographer to serve as president of the National Press Photographers Association. At the time of his death in July 1982 he was Director of Photography at the Flint Journal. The Barry Edmonds Award was established to recognize and honor photographers whose work best portrays the common purpose of man. The subjects may show facets of human relationships, friendship, mutual concern for the environment, a lifting hope for peace or any aspect of life appropriate to the theme of Michigan Understanding.

Trained as an artist from boyhood on, he received his degree in Art Education and was a teacher at Mt. Morris High School from 1954 to 1955. The Flint Journal hired Edmonds in May 1955. He was mentored by Bill Gallagher (Pulitzer Prize 1953)and Dante Levi of The Flint Journal and J. D. Hicks (Hicks Studios). He went on to develop his own style deeply relating to the human condition. As an educator Edmonds emphasized the need for continuing education for photojournalists and newspaper photographers. For many years he was one of the lecturers on the Traveling Short Course sponsored by National Press Photographers Association during 1960s and 1970s which was presented in the United States and Europe.

While he remained in Flint, Michigan all his life, he was offered staff positions by The National Geographic Magazine, The Washington Post, The Miami Herald and other prominent newspapers. He chose to remain close to his wife and three children rather than pursue a national career.
