= The Saginaw News =

Newspaper in Saginaw, Michigan

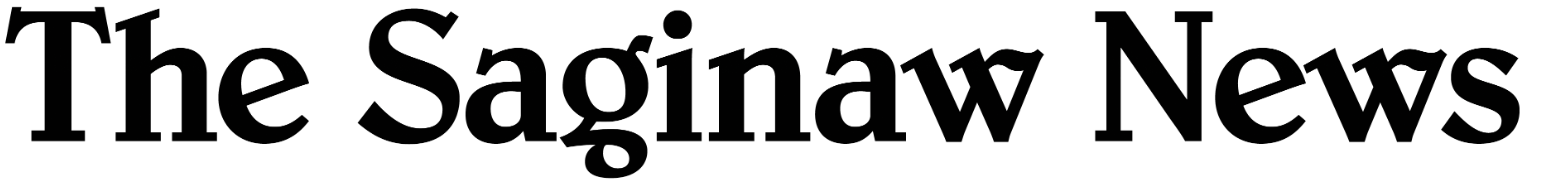
- Type: Four times weekly (Tuesday, Thursday, Friday, Sunday)
- Format: Broadsheet
- Owner(s): MLive Media Group (Advance Publications)
- Publisher: Tim Gruber
- Editor: Bob Johnson
- Language: English
- Headquarters: Saginaw, Michigan, United States
- Circulation: 4,354 Daily; 9,525 Sunday (as of 2022)
- Sister newspapers: The Bay City Times, Flint Journal
- Website: mlive.com/saginaw

The Saginaw News is a newspaper publication based in Saginaw, Michigan, owned by MLive Media Group, originally known as Booth Newspapers or Booth Michigan, a division of Advance Publications. Published on Thursdays, Fridays and Sundays (along with a joint Tuesday edition with The Bay City Times), the paper has approximately 30,000 readers each day. It celebrated its 150th year in 2009.

The paper was originally published seven days a week until June 1, 2009, when the News and its sister papers, The Bay City Times and The Flint Journal, reduced publishing to three times a week—Thursday, Friday and Sunday, while increasing their web presence. In addition, The Saginaw News began to be published at the Booth-owned Valley Publishing Co. printing plant in Monitor Township, near Bay City.

On March 30, 2010, The Saginaw News and The Bay City Times launched a joint Tuesday print edition, Great Lakes Bay Edition, which is available at selected locations in Saginaw, Bay and Midland Counties.

MLive Media Group announced that publication of the print edition of the paper, along with its sister papers and several other print newspapers it publishes throughout Michigan, will come to an end with a final publication on December 6th, 2026.

== Staff ==
The Saginaw News is headed up by President Dan Gaydou; its editorial staff is led by Executive Editor Paul Keep, who also is executive editor of MLive.com's sister newspapers across Michigan. Local coverage for The Saginaw News is directed by Editor Jodi McFarland; managing producer Eric English. Reporters and their coverage beats are Mark Tower, City Hall; Brad Devereaux, police; Bob Johnson; police and schools; Andy Hoag, courts; Heather Jordan, business; Jessica Shepherd, entertainment; Hugh Bernreuter and Cory Butzin, sports; Jeff Schrier, photographer.

== See also ==
- Saginaw Daily Courier
