= The Bay City Times =

Newspaper published in Bay City, Michigan

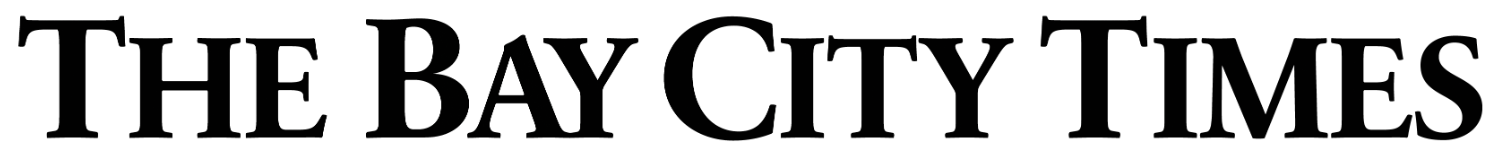
- Type: Three-times weekly newspaper, plus a joint edition with The Saginaw News
- Format: Broadsheet
- Owner(s): MLive Media Group (Advance Publications)
- Publisher: Tim Gruber
- Editor: Bob Johnson
- Founded: 1873
- Language: English
- Headquarters: Bay City, Michigan, United States
- Circulation: 4,387 Daily; 8,486 Sunday (as of 2022)
- Sister newspapers: Times Plus
- ISSN: 2638-3314
- Website: mlive.com/bay-city

The Bay City Times is a newspaper published in Bay City, Michigan, United States, published Thursdays, Fridays and Sundays, with a Tuesday edition jointly published with The Saginaw News. The paper is published by Booth Newspapers, owned by Advance Publications. The paper is the most widely circulated newspaper in northeastern Michigan. The newspaper began in 1873 and remains one of the oldest newspapers still in circulation.

The paper originally published seven days a week until June 1, 2009, when the Times and its sister papers, The Saginaw News and The Flint Journal, reduced publishing to three times a week (Thursday, Friday and Sunday) while increasing their web presence. The Times, along with the News and the Journal, are published at the Booth-owned Valley Publishing Co. printing plant in Monitor Township, near Bay City.

On March 30, 2010, The Bay City Times and The Saginaw News launched a joint Tuesday print edition, Great Lakes Bay Edition, which is available at selected locations in Bay, Saginaw and Midland Counties. Both the News and the Times share the same sports section and staff, Hugh Bernreuter, Cory Butzin, Michael Niziolek and Lee Thompson, and the same features sections and staff. Both newspapers and the Flint Journal share the same radio and television writer, Sue White.
