= George Lewis (priest) =

18th-century Irish Priest

George Lewis was an 18th-century Anglican priest in Ireland.

Lewis was educated at Queens' College, Cambridge. He was Archdeacon of Meath from 1723 until his death in 1730.
