= George Lewis (footballer, born 1875) =

English footballer

Personal information
- Full name: George Lewis
- Date of birth: 1875
- Place of birth: Chasetown, England
- Position: Full back

Senior career*
Years	Team	Apps	(Gls)
1894–1896	Walsall	32	(1)
1896–1897	Wellingborough		
1897–1902	Notts County	129	(1)
1902–1903	Bristol City	30	(1)
1903	Stourbridge		
1903–1904	Leicester Fosse	10	(0)
1904	Stourbridge		
Total		201	(3)
- * Club domestic league appearances and goals

George Lewis (1875–unknown) was an English footballer who played in the Football League for Bristol City, Leicester Fosse, Notts County and Walsall.
