= John N. Ingersoll House =

- U.S. National Register of Historic Places
- Michigan State Historic Site
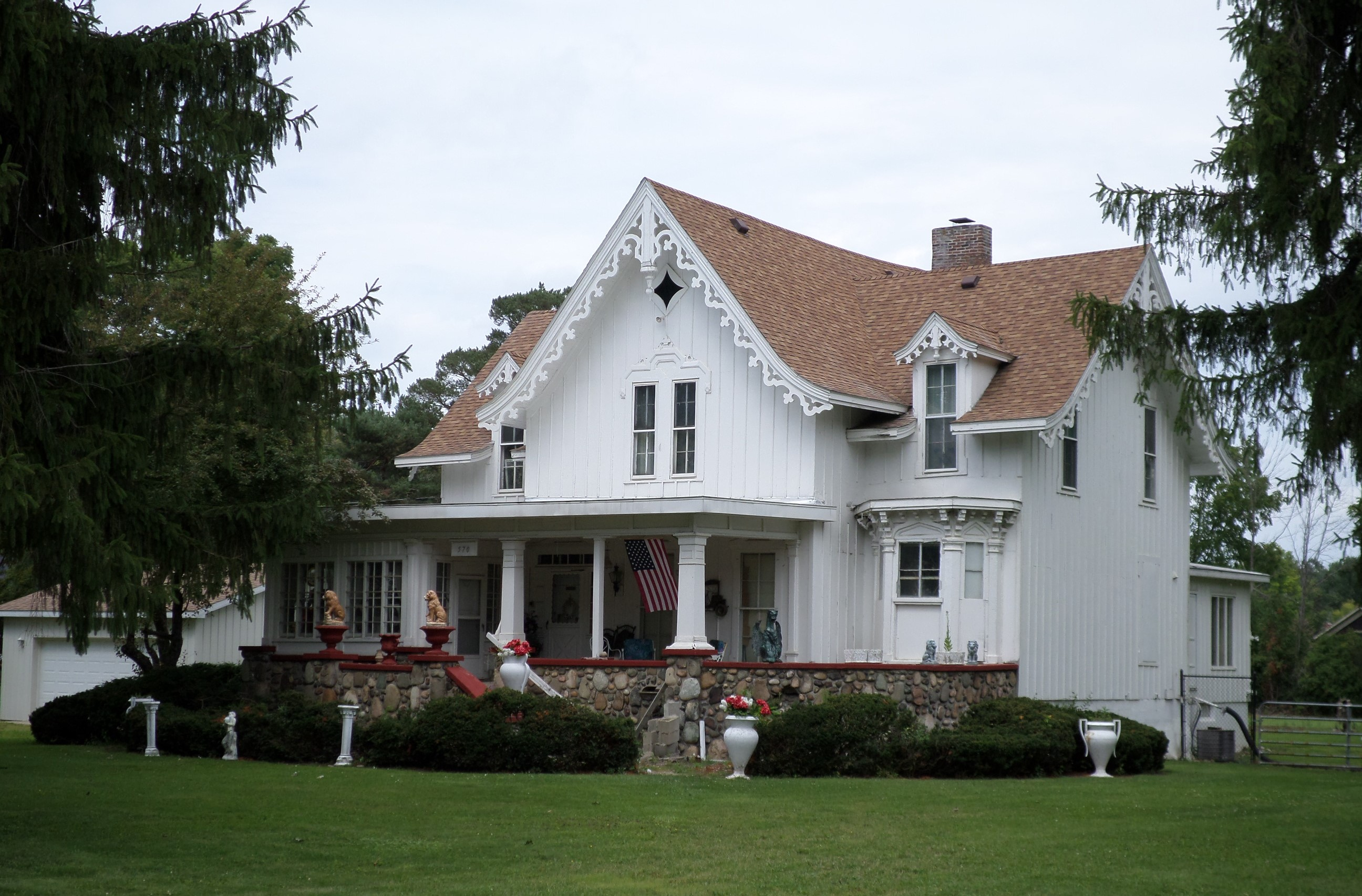
- Interactive map
- Location: 570 W. Corunna Ave., Corunna, Michigan
- Coordinates: 42°58′57″N 84°07′35″W
- Area: 2 acres (0.81 ha)
- Built: 1868
- Architectural style: Carpenter Gothic
- NRHP reference No.: 80001890
- Added to NRHP: May 9, 1980

The John N. Ingersoll House is a single-family home located at 570 West Corunna Avenue in Corunna, Michigan. It was listed on the National Register of Historic Places in 1980.

== History ==
John Ingersoll was born in North Castle, New York in 1817. The family moved to New York City, where in 1828 John's parents died. He was adopted by his uncle, and two years later began an apprenticeship as a printer at a newspaper in New York. In 1837, Henry Barnes, owner of the Detroit Free Press, noticed Ingersoll and invited him to work in Detroit. Ingersoll moved there with his wife Harriett, but the next year he left the Free Press to become foreman on the Detroit Daily Advertiser, and in 1839 he went into the publishing business himself by publishing the Macomb Statesman in Mt. Clemens, Michigan. He moved on the St. Clair, Michigan to publish the Banner in 1842.

Ingersoll continued to wander to different papers, publishing the Lake Superior News and Miners Journal from first Copper Harbor, Michigan and then Sault Ste. Marie, Michigan. He returned to Detroit, publishing two papers there, moved to Rochester, New York, and in 1858 moved to Owosso, Michigan to publish the American. Harriett Ingersoll died in 1860, and John Ingersoll settled down somewhat, entering local politics, and in 1862 merging the Owosso American with the Corunna Democrat, changing the name of the merged publication to the Shiawassee American. He married Mrs. Julia H. Barnum of Owosso in 1864, and built a new house for the family in Corunna in 1868. He continued in politice, and published papers in Corunna and Owosso until his death in 1881.

== Description ==
The John N. Ingersoll House is a three-bay, two-story, wood-frame Carpenter Gothic residence. The house has board and batten siding and steeply pitched gable roofs, accented with ski-slope eaves and decorative bargeboards. The front facade is symmetrical, with a wide projecting center bay. The front entryway is topped with a small-paned transom and flanked by side lights. Two four-over-four double hung sash windows are located to the right of the door. On the second story are two paired four-over-four double hung sash windows. A gable roof caps the center bay, with a curved diamond window in the gable end.

The bay to the right of center contains a tri-sided bay at the first-floor level with multi-paned double-hung sash windows. Above this is a four-over-four double hung sash window within a small gable, breaking the eavesline of the main roof. A similar window is on the second story level of the bay to the left of center. Below, a twentieth-century porch obscures the original first-floor level of the front facade on the left and center bay.
