= Advance Newspapers =

Newspaper chain

Advance BCI, Inc.
- Trade name: Advance Newspapers
- Type: Division
- Industry: Media
- Headquarters: Hudsonville, Michigan
- Products: newspapers
- Parent: MLive Media Group

Advance Newspapers, based in Hudsonville, Michigan, published weekly community newspapers for Kent County, Michigan and portions of Muskegon, Ottawa, and Allegan counties. Advance Newspapers started as an independent company, later purchased by Advance Publications which later placed them into their MLive Media Group unit. MLive Media Group ceased publication of the seven community newspapers as of January 27, 2019, citing the "cost of publishing the products exceeded the company’s ability to sustain production."

The seven Advance community newspapers at the time of their shuttering were:

- Southwest Advance – covering Byron Center and Wyoming
- Grand Valley Advance – covering Allendale, Hudsonville, Allendale and Jenison
- Cadence Advance – covering East Grand Rapids, Ada and the Forest Hills area
- Northeast Advance – covering Rockford, Cedar Springs and the Northview area
- Northwest Advance – covering Walker, Comstock Park, Coopersville, Sparta and vicinity
- Penasee Globe – covering Wayland, Hopkins, Dorr, Martin and the Gun Lake area
- Southeast Advance – covering Kentwood, Caledonia and Cutlerville
