= Muskegon Chronicle =

Newspaper in Muskegon, Michigan, US

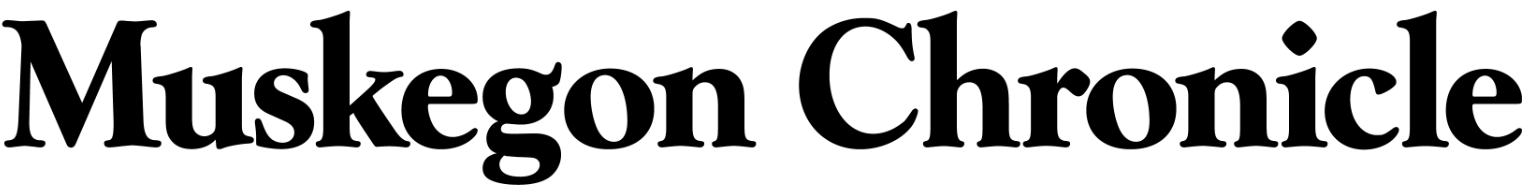
- Type: Daily newspaper
- Owner(s): MLive Media Group (Advance Publications)
- Publisher: Tim Gruber
- Editor: Eric Gaertner
- Founded: 1857; 169 years ago
- Circulation: 6,544 Daily; 11,725 Sunday (as of 2022)
- Sister newspapers: The Grand Rapids Press; Lakeshore Press
- Website: www.mlive.com/news/muskegon/

The Muskegon Chronicle is a daily newspaper in Muskegon, Michigan, owned by MLive Media Group. It was founded in 1857.

Because of common ownership with Grand Rapids Press, the Chronicle's coverage and distribution focuses on Muskegon, Newaygo, Oceana, and Ottawa County north of the Grand River, while the Press focuses on Kent, Ottawa (south of the Grand River), and Allegan counties. These two papers often publish each other's stories. Beginning with the October 18 edition, printing of the Chronicle was moved from Muskegon to the Walker, Michigan, printing facility of The Grand Rapids Press. Both newspapers are still printed daily, although home delivery for both was reduced to three days a week (Tuesday, Thursday, and Sunday) with an e-edition available to subscribers and the print edition available only in newsstands on the other days.

== Features ==
- Parade Magazine is inserted in Sunday's paper.
- Susan Harrison Wolffis, Clayton Hardiman, and Marla Miller write columns.
- The television listings section, "On TV," is published on Saturday. The Saturday paper is the smallest paper of the week.
- On Tuesdays, a community paper is published. It is similar to the Advance Newspapers but features no original content. It is distributed only to those who don't subscribe to the daily paper.
- The Chronicle no longer has a physical location in Muskegon.
- Water's Edge is a quarterly visitor's guide to Muskegon and Grand Haven.
- The Chronicle publishes books based on its archives, focusing on Muskegon's history. A book about Buster Keaton is available, as well as books about Muskegon street names and the origins of several companies founded in the city.
- WOOD-TV provides weather forecasts.
- The "Jobs and Business" section is published on Sunday and Wednesday.
- The "Edge" section is published everyday except Monday, Wednesday, and Thursday. Each day has its own features: food/health, family/faith, and movies/TV. On Monday, it is called "SIMPLE," an acronym listing the food and health-related topics found in the section. It includes features found in "Edge" - syndicated columns, comics, crossword puzzle, etc.
- "MAX" is published on Thursday and is a weekend entertainment guide.
