= The Grand Rapids Press =

Newspaper

- Front page on February 18, 2009
- Type: Daily newspaper
- Format: Broadsheet
- Owner(s): MLive Media Group (Advance Publications)
- Publisher: Tim Gruber
- Editor: Monica Scott
- Language: English
- Headquarters: 169 Monroe Ave NW #100, Grand Rapids, MI 49503
- Circulation: 21,433 Daily; 50,834 Sunday (as of 2022)
- Sister newspapers: The Lakeshore Press
- ISSN: 2574-8378 (print); 2691-9419 (web)
- OCLC number: 9975013
- Website: www.mlive.com/grand-rapids-muskegon/

The Grand Rapids Press is a daily newspaper published in Grand Rapids, Michigan. It is the largest of the print publications of MLive Media Group. It is sold for $1.50 daily and $7.99 on Sunday.

AccuWeather provides weather content to the Grand Rapids Press.

== History ==
The Morning Press was founded by William J. Sproat and appeared on Monday, September 1, 1890. Sproat was its proprietor until November 5, 1891, when control passed to the Press Publishing company. Soon after, the controlling interest in the company was purchased by George G. Booth, who in 1892 bought the rival Grand Rapids Eagle and merged it with the Press. January 1, 1893, the Press went into the evening daily field, which it has since occupied.

This newspaper at first was published at 63 Pearl Street. Then for a number of years it occupied a building on the Grand River at the southeast end of the Pearl Street bridge. In 1906 it moved to a new home at Fulton Street and Sheldon Avenue.

The paper was published downtown at the corner of Monroe and Michigan until 2004 when the printing facility was moved to the northern suburb of Walker. The Walker facility was closed in October, 2020, and sold in 2021 to an industrial contracting firm. The newspaper is now printed in Cleveland, OH, at the same facility that prints the Plain Dealer. The editorial and newsroom offices are now at 169 Monroe Ave. NW, suite 100. They hire aspiring journalists through an internship program.

Home delivery for the Press, Muskegon Chronicle and Kalamazoo Gazette were cut back to Tuesdays, Thursdays and Sundays in 2012; on the other days in which the Grand Rapids Press is published, subscribers receive an e-edition of that day's newspaper. The print edition of each day's Press continues to be available in newsstands.

== Bibliography ==
- Etten, William J., A Citizens' History of Grand Rapids, Michigan
