= Kalamazoo Gazette =

Newspaper in Kalamazoo, Michigan

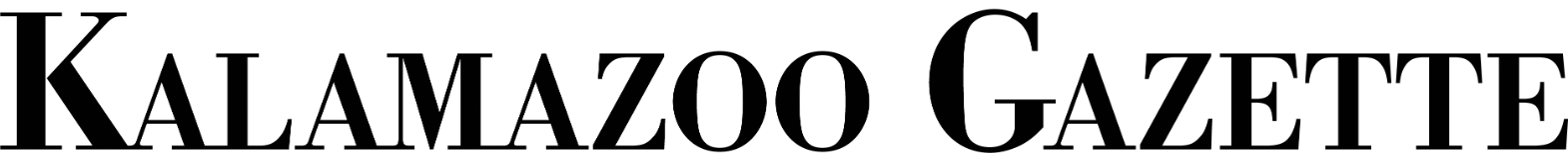
- Type: Daily newspaper
- Format: Broadsheet
- Owner(s): MLive Media Group (Advance Publications)
- Publisher: Tim Gruber
- Editor: Mark Tower
- Founded: 1837
- Headquarters: 306 S. Kalamazoo Mall; Kalamazoo, Michigan 49001; United States
- Circulation: 9,290 daily 20,716 Sunday (as of 2022)
- Website: mlive.com/kalamazoo

The Kalamazoo Gazette is the daily newspaper in Kalamazoo, Michigan, and is part of MLive Media Group, Michigan's largest local media organization. The Gazette publishes seven days a week. Papers are available for home delivery on Thursday and Sunday.

== History ==
Originally founded in 1833 by John D. Defrees as the Michigan Statesman and St. Joseph Chronicle, the paper's name was shortened to the Michigan Statesman after it was purchased by Henry Gilbert. The paper became the Kalamazoo Gazette in 1837.

In April 2010, the Gazette announced it would pay $1,525,000 to the City of Kalamazoo to avoid lawsuits seeking $4 million in previously awarded tax breaks related to the 2002 expansion of their downtown Kalamazoo printing facility. The 2002 expansion cost the Gazette $33 million, including $20 million in new equipment. The breaks were awarded on the condition that the Gazette maintain 175 jobs related to the expansion until 2014.

On November 2, 2011, the Gazette's owners announced that the newspaper would limit home delivery to Tuesdays, Thursdays, and Sundays beginning February 2, 2012 as it made the transition to a digital-first news organization as part of the newly created MLive Media Group. In November, the Gazette also confirmed 77 employees were issued layoff notices related to the reorganization while an unspecified number of employees were hired back by MLive.

On February 2, 2012, the Gazette moved into its new hub at 306 S. Kalamazoo Mall. The hub is an open-office environment and is also designed to accommodate community events. Printing facilities for the Gazette were moved from Kalamazoo to MLive Media Group's printing facility in Walker, Michigan in 2012 and are shared with The Grand Rapids Press and Muskegon Chronicle.

=== Publishers and editors, 1833-2011 ===
In the early days of the paper, the publisher (owner) and editor were generally the same person. In the 1900s, those roles were commonly separate. A list of people who ran the paper from 1833 to 2011 flows (with year they began):

Editor and publisher
1833 John D. Defrees (in White Pigeon)
1834 Henry Gilbert
1839 E. D. Burr
1841 Henry Gilbert
1846 Volney Hascall
1862 Joseph W. Mansur
1865-1869 Several ownership configurations, involving William Shakespeare, B.S. Gleason, Joseph Lomax, and Elijah J. Clark
1870 Andrew J. Shakespeare
1897 Edgar Bartlett
1898 T. B. Shoaff
1900 Frank Ford Rowe

Publisher		Editor
1923	Charles M. Greenway Jr. (Manager)	1912	John K. Walsh
1953	Ralph H. Bastien Jr. (Manager)	1959	Daniel M. Ryan
1983	Daniel M. Ryan	1983	James R. Mosby
1988	George E. Arwady	2000–11	Rebecca Pierce
2004	James Stephanak

== Awards ==
In 2009, the Gazette was named "Newspaper of the Year" by the Michigan Press Association. The Michigan Press Association also named the Gazette Newspaper of the Year in its circulation category on October 6, 2013.

In the MPA's annual Better Newspaper Contest for 2013, the Gazette won 23 awards, including first place in all four photo categories (three won by Mark Bugnaski, the fourth by intern Matt Gade), as well as first place for general excellence, editorial writing, local columnist (Julie Mack), feature story (Yvonne Zipp) and sports columnist (David Drew).
