= George Lewis (British Army officer) =

British Army Colonel

- Posthumous portrait of Lewis by John Copley
- Born: 22 March 1735; Farringdon, London, England, Kingdom of Great Britain
- Died: 22 February 1791 (aged 55); Chislehurst, Kent, England, Kingdom Of Great Britain
- Military career
- Allegiance: Kingdom of Great Britain
- Branch: British Army
- Rank: Colonel
- Conflicts: Seven Years' War; Siege of Louisbourg; Battle of Havana; American Revolutionary War; Battle of Quebec (1775); Great Siege of Gibraltar; Battle of Martinique

George Lewis (March 22, 1735 – February 22, 1791) was a Colonel in the British Army and commander of the Royal Artillery at the Siege of Gibraltar. He served in the several campaigns against the French and Spaniards in America, from 1757 to the end of the war in 1762, and was present at the taking Louisburgh, Quebec, Martinique, and Havannah. He is most famously known for the events that took place on 13 September 1782, at the Siege of Gibraltar, when the artillery under his direction set fire to and destroyed all the floating batteries of the combined forces of France and Spain. For this he was awarded a mark of Royal favour by King George III. He was also a sitter in The Siege and Relief of Gibraltar by John Singleton Copley.

== Personal life ==
Lewis was born in Farringdon, Berkshire to Joshua and Elizabeth Lewis on 22 March 1735 and had one sister. He married Mary Russel on 3 May 1764 and had eight children.

== Military service ==
Lewis fought in many battles including the Battle of Havana and the Siege of Louisbourg. He also commanded a company of the 2nd Battalion, Royal Artillery, during the defense of Gibraltar from 1779 to 1783.
