= The Ann Arbor News =

Newspaper in Michigan

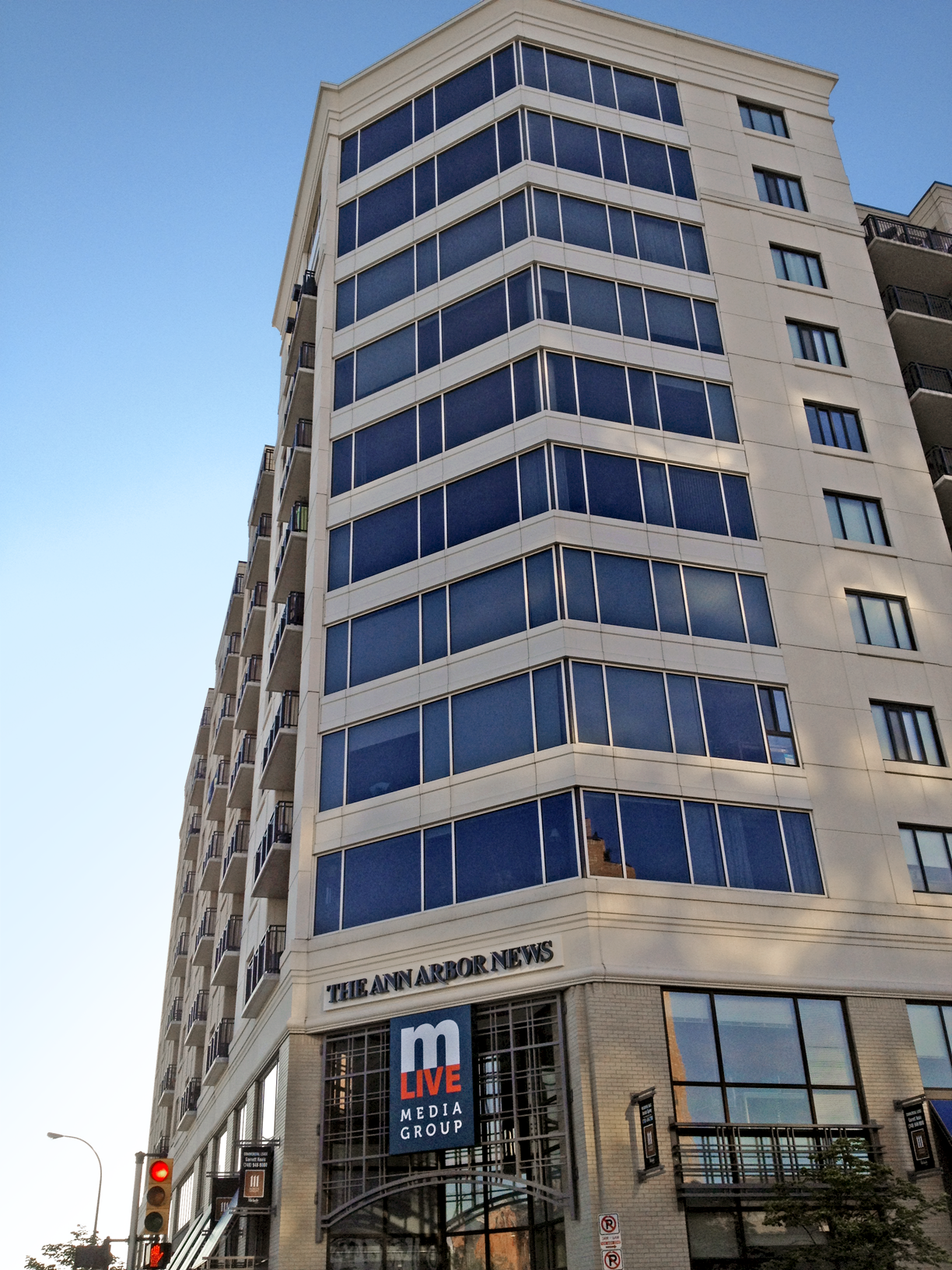
- Type: Online/Bi-weekly print (Thursday & Sunday)
- Format: Broadsheet
- Owner(s): MLive Media Group (Advance Publications)
- Publisher: Tim Gruber
- Editor: John Count
- Founded: 1835
- Ceased publication: July 23, 2009
- Relaunched: 2013
- Headquarters: 111 N. Ashley St. Ann Arbor, Michigan
- Circulation: 8,196 Daily; 14,352 Sunday (as of 2022)
- Website: mlive.com/ann-arbor

The Ann Arbor News is a newspaper serving Washtenaw and Livingston counties in Michigan. Published daily online through MLive.com, the paper also publishes print editions on Thursdays and Sundays.

== History ==
=== Original publication ===
Published in Ann Arbor under various names from 1835 to 2009, The News was part of Booth Newspapers, owned after 1976 by Advance Publications. The News was published in the afternoons Monday through Friday and in the mornings on weekends and holidays. It published special sections throughout the year.

The newspaper ended its 174-year print run on July 23, 2009. The publisher blamed the loss of classified advertising revenue (which moved to Craigslist), and noted "the seven-day-a-week print model just is not sustainable here. We have very low home ownership. The population is transient and young. Those demographics have worked against us."

=== Website ===
The Ann Arbor News was replaced by a website, AnnArbor.com, which carried daily news stories and was accompanied by print editions on Thursdays and Sundays. Of the 272 people employed as of the announcement of the paper's closing, "more than a dozen" were hired for AnnArbor.com.

The closure also ended Livingston Community News, a free weekly newspaper for Livingston County published from 2003 to 2009 by the Ann Arbor News.

The company closed the Ann Arbor Business Review at the same time and moved the weekly publication under the brand of AnnArbor.com. Several employees of Ann Arbor Business Review were hired by the new company.

The Ann Arbor News is believed to be the first daily newspaper to fail in an American city with only one for-profit daily newspaper. (A Monday-through-Friday paper, The Michigan Daily, is the student newspaper of the University of Michigan and is non-profit.)

=== Renaming ===
In 2013, AnnArbor.com was transitioned to MLive.com along with Advance Publications' other Michigan newspapers and renamed back to The Ann Arbor News.

== Awards ==
- 1982 Penney-Missouri Award General Excellence

== Building ==
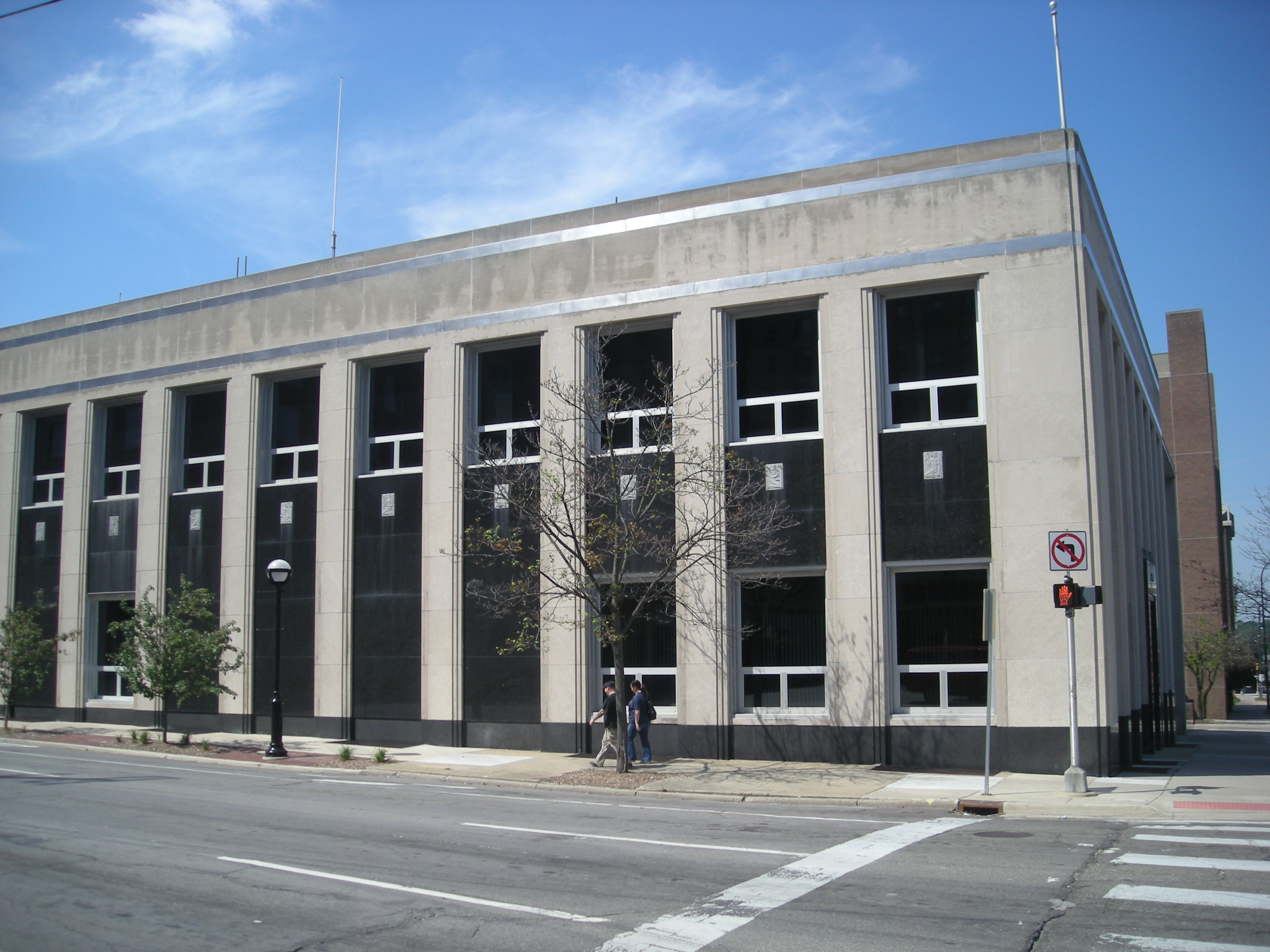
Ann Arbor News Building 1936–2009 in 2013

From 1936 until its closing in 2009, The Ann Arbor News owned and occupied a three-story Art Deco-style building at the corner of Huron and Division streets in downtown Ann Arbor. It is the only commercial building in the city designed by famed architect Albert Kahn. The building was sold to the University of Michigan Credit Union in 2010.
