= The Flint Journal =

American newspaper

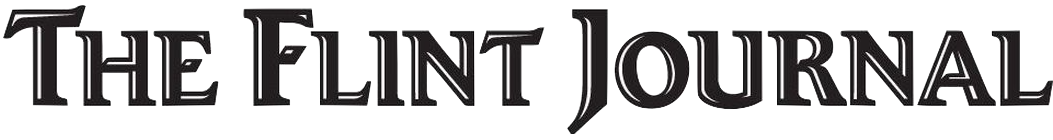
- Type: Quad-weekly newspaper
- Format: Broadsheet
- Owner(s): MLive Media Group (Advance Publications)
- Publisher: Dan Gaydou
- Founded: 1876; 150 years ago
- Headquarters: 540 S Saginaw St, Suite 504; Flint, Michigan, U.S. 48502
- Circulation: 8,326 Daily; 17,576 Sunday (as of 2022)
- Sister newspapers: The Saginaw News; The Bay City Times
- Website: mlive.com/flint

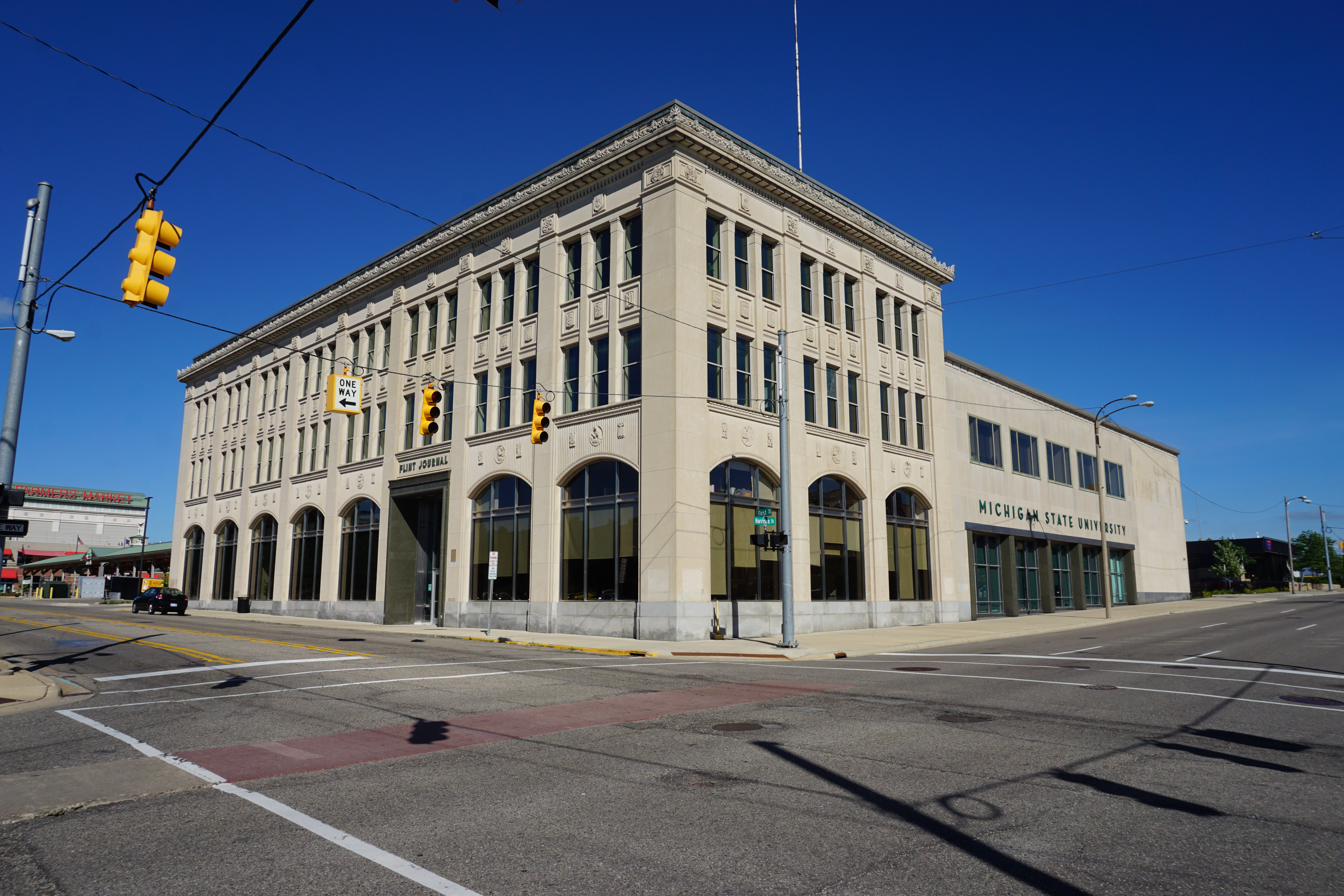
The former Flint Journal Building, designed by Albert Kahn in 1924, is now used by the Michigan State University College of Human Medicine.

The Flint Journal is a quad-weekly newspaper based in Flint, Michigan, owned by Booth Newspapers, a subsidiary of Advance Publications. Published Tuesdays, Thursdays, Fridays and Sundays, it serves Genesee, Lapeer and Shiawassee Counties. As of February 2, 2012, it is headquartered in Downtown Flint at 540 S Saginaw St, Suite 504. The paper and its sister publications The Saginaw News and The Bay City Times are printed at the Booth-owned Valley Publishing Co. printing plant in Monitor Township.

== History ==
The Flint Journal was founded in 1876 during Flint's booming lumber years by Charles Fellows and Washington Irving Beardsley as a weekly newspaper The Journal's main competitors at the time were the Wolverine Citizen, The Genesee Democrat and The Flint Globe. The paper was sold in rapid succession to Doctor Carman, who sold ownership in December 1882 to George McConnolly and others until the Journal was purchased by the Flint Globe's owner, Howard H. Fitzgerald, and merged as the Weekly Globe and Daily Journal. The Booth Publishing Company, owned by Ralph H. Booth of Detroit, along with his brothers George and Edmund, purchased ownership of the Weekly Globe and Daily Journal in 1911. In 1919, the Journal had a paid circulation of 25,947, giving it the 4th largest paid circulation of any evening newspaper in the state. By the early 1920s, the Journal had not only consolidated with the Globe but also the Flint Daily News. In July 1922, the Journal entered the field of radio broadcasting, becoming partners with local broadcaster Frank D. Fallain to put Flint's first station, WEAA, on the air. The newspaper was known as the Flint Daily Journal until 1935, when its name was shortened to the Flint Journal.

Along with the rest of the Booth properties, the Journal was sold to newspaper publisher S.I. (Sy) Newhouse's Advance Publications in November 1976 for an estimated $305 million. On January 27, 2013, its old headquarters at 200 E First St was leased to the Michigan State University College of Human Medicine.

Since the newspaper's conception, it has been eminently acknowledged for its coverage of local news. Major events that occurred in Flint, like the 1936 Sit-Down Strike, were reported with an up-and-close perspective.

=== Reduced publication dates ===
On June 1, 2009, the Journal and its sister papers, The Saginaw News and The Bay City Times, reduced publishing to three times a week—Thursday, Friday and Sunday, while increasing their interactive media capabilities. The changes came after the three papers laid off 35% of their staff in March 2009. Also at that point, all three newspapers increased their online presence, in partnership with MLive.com.

The Flint Journal added a Tuesday print edition starting on March 23, 2010, bringing the number of publishing days a week to four. Unlike the other three daily editions, Tuesdays were originally "news stand only;" however, since June 7, 2011, the Tuesday edition has also been delivered to subscribers. If Metro Detroit is not counted, Flint is the fifth-largest city in the United States, and second largest in Michigan, without a daily newspaper. In 2012, the Journal donated its archives, consisting of more than 100,000 Flint Journal newspaper clippings, books, microfilm, microfiche and photographs, to Flint's Sloan Museum.

In 2014, the MLive Media Group newspapers including the Flint Journal introduced digital editions via apps for tablets and smartphones on Monday, Wednesday and Saturday to complement the four print editions, which are also available in digital editions.

== Circulation ==
In March 2012, the Journal had an average Tuesday, Thursday, and Friday circulation of 49,685, and a Sunday circulation of 66,622. At the end of 2017, the Flint Journal had a paid circulation of 33,215 for the weekly editions, and 45,051 for the Sunday edition.

== See also ==
- Barry Edmonds
- William M. Gallagher
