= AnnArbor.com =

Online newspaper in Michigan, US

- AnnArbor.com on a typical day. Note the blog style, voting, and "deal".
- Type: Online and printed twice weekly
- Owner: Advance Publications
- Founded: July 24, 2009
- Ceased publication: 2013
- Headquarters: Ann Arbor, Michigan
- Circulation: 28,290 Thursday (2012); 34,923 Sunday (2012)
- Website: www.mlive.com/ann-arbor/

AnnArbor.com was an online newspaper that covered local news of Ann Arbor, Michigan, and the surrounding Washtenaw County. In 2013 AnnArbor.com was transitioned to MLive.com along with Advance Publications other Michigan newspapers and renamed The Ann Arbor News.

== Overview ==
AnnArbor.com reported news both online and in print. The print version was also known as AnnArbor.com and was published on Thursdays and Sundays. It had a full-time staff of 60, 35 of which were reporters; 80 more bloggers. The website had online ads known as "deals", on which users could vote to include on the Sunday print edition.

As a website, AnnArbor.com was not only a news source but also a place for social interaction, presenting information in a chronological blog-style format. Users could register to start "conversations" and upload photos and videos.

== History ==
AnnArbor.com was launched on July 24, 2009, to replace The Ann Arbor News, when Advance Publications, the parent company of the News as well as more than 20 other daily newspapers, attempted to produce a greater profit from the newspaper. By downsizing the print edition from seven days a week to two, the newspaper could reduce costs, becoming more sustainable in the long run. The website is part of Advance's experiment to convert its paper publications to online versions; Ann Arbor was chosen because a study found that 92% of its population was able to access online news. In response to the change, one local lamented, "The [175-year-old] News was like an old friend." A Time article has compared the News to similar defunct newspapers like the Seattle Post-Intelligencer and the Rocky Mountain News. In 2013, AnnArbor.com was transitioned to MLive.com and renamed The Ann Arbor News.
