= L. Whitney Watkins =

American politician (1873–1950)

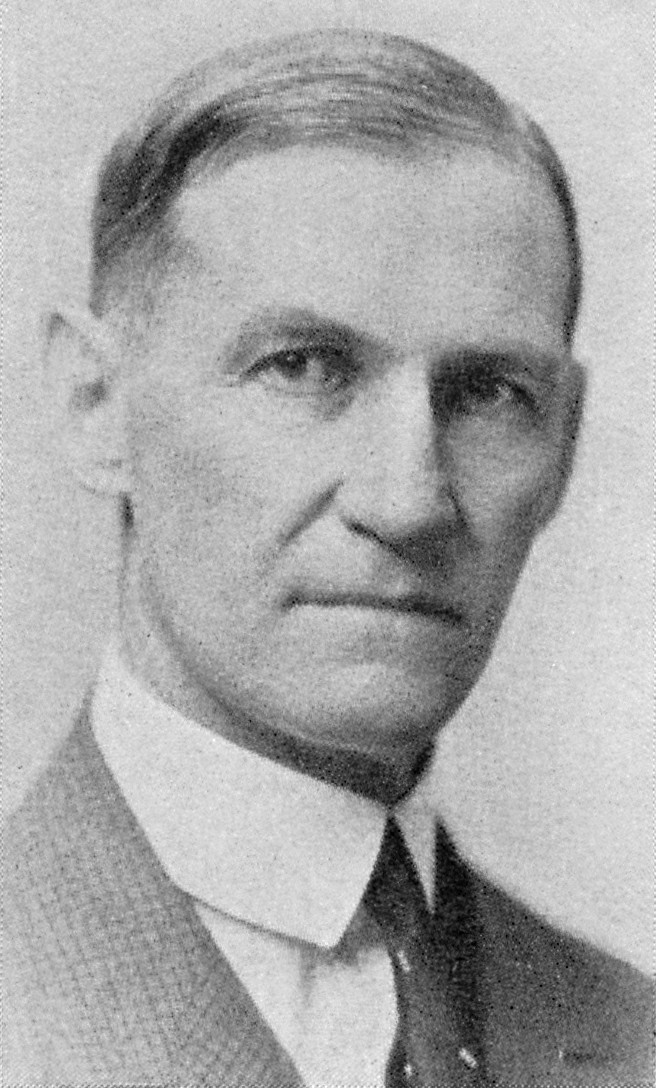

Member of the Michigan Senate from the 10th district
- In office January 1, 1909 – 1913
- Preceded by: Archibald J. Peek
- Succeeded by: J. Weston Hutchins

Personal details
- Born: Lucius Whitney Watkins; August 6, 1873 Norvell Township, Michigan, U.S.
- Died: September 17, 1950 (aged 77) Tecumseh, Michigan, U.S.
- Resting place: Oak Grove Cemetery, Manchester, Michigan, U.S.
- Party: Republican
- Other political affiliations: Bull Moose (1912–1915)
- Spouse: Grace Edith Alley
- Children: 4
- Education: Agricultural College of the State of Michigan

Lucius Whitney Watkins (August 6, 1873 – September 17, 1950) was an American politician who served in the Michigan Senate from the 10th district from 1909 to 1913, as a member of the Republican Party. He later served on the Michigan Board of Agriculture from 1920 to 1932, and commissioner of the Michigan Department of Agriculture from 1923 to 1927.

Born in Norvell Township, Michigan, Watkins was educated at the Agricultural College of the State of Michigan. He worked as a Deputy State Game and Fish Warden from 1896 to 1898, and operated a farm. He was elected to the state senate in 1908, where he served and chaired agricultural committees.

A supporter of Theodore Roosevelt, Watkins joined the Bull Moose Party and was its gubernatorial nominee in 1912. He was elected to the Michigan Board of Agriculture in 1919 and 1925, and chaired it from 1921 to 1931. In 1937, he was appointed as a director of the Detroit branch of the Federal Reserve Bank of Chicago and served until 1945.

== Early life and education ==
Lucius Whitney Watkins was born on a farm in Norvell Township, Michigan, on August 6, 1873, to L.D. Watkins and Sarah English. His father was born in Keene, New Hampshire, and his mother was born in King's County, Ireland. L.D. Watkins moved from New Hampshire to Michigan in 1834, where he started a farm. Watkins graduated from the Agricultural College of the State of Michigan in 1893. He was given an honorary degree in agriculture from the college in 1932.

== Career ==
=== Agriculture, education, and appointments ===
Chase Osborn appointed Watkins as a Deputy State Game and Fish Warden for central southern Michigan in 1896, and served until 1898. Watkins worked as a farmer and operated a 2,000 acre farm by 1920. He was president of both the State Association of Farmers' Clubs and State Live Stock Breeders and Feeders' Association from 1906 to 1907. A farm bureau was established in Jackson County in 1918, and Watkins was made president.

Governor Hazen S. Pingree appointed Watkins to the board of trustees for the Agricultural College of the State of Michigan in 1899, and served until 1905. Watkins had a role in changing the name of the Agricultural College of the State of Michigan to Michigan State College in 1925.

Woodbridge N. Ferris selected Watkins as a delegate to the 4th American Peace Congress in 1913. He was the chair of the liberty bond campaign in Norvell in 1917. He was made secretary of the Emergency Grain Board of the Michigan Committee of Near East Relief in 1921, and the organization called for 100,000 bushels of grain from Michigan to be sent to Anatolia.

On May 29, 1937, Watkins was appointed to a term as a director of the Detroit branch of the Federal Reserve Bank of Chicago ending on December 31, 1938. He was given two additional three year terms. He was president and general manager of the Detroit Packing Company.

=== Senate state and gubernatorial campaign ===
Watkins was elected to the Michigan Senate from the 10th district in the 1908 election and reelected in 1910. During Watkins' tenure in the state senate he served on the Executive Business, Supplies and Expenses, Agricultural College, Liquor Traffic, Banks and Corporations, and Fisheries committees. He was chair of the Agricultural Interests, Gaming Interests, and Horticulture committees.

Watkins attended the 1904 Republican National Convention as an alternate delegate from Michigan's 4th congressional district. During the 1910 gubernatorial election Watkins supported Osborn for the Republican nomination. Watkins was a delegate to the 1912 Republican National Convention from Michigan's 2nd congressional district and supported Theodore Roosevelt for the Republican presidential nomination.

The Jackson Citizen-Press called for Whitney to run in the 1912 gubernatorial election, but he stated that he would not on May 20. Watkins became the chair of the Bull Moose Party in Michigan and was elected as an at-large delegate from Jackson County to the state convention. Watkins wanted Osborn to run for reelection in 1912, but Watkins was given the Bull Moose's gubernatorial nomination despite him stating that "I have earnestly sought to avoid" the nomination. Osborn endorsed Watkins for governor. Watkins placed third behind Democratic nominee Ferris and Republican nominee Amos S. Musselman.

In 1913, Watkins was an at-large delegate to the Bull Moose's state convention. There were attempts to get Watkins to run for governor in 1914, but he declined to run and instead endorsed Osborn. Watkins rejoined the Republican Party in 1915, as he no longer believed the Bull Moose Party was capable of winning elections. He declined to run seek the Republican gubernatorial nomination in the 1920 and 1928 elections.

=== Department of Agriculture ===
Dora Hall Stockman and Watkins were given the Republican nominations for seats on the Michigan Board of Agriculture, defeating incumbents A.J. Doherty and Robert D. Graham; both were elected in 1919. W.H. Wallace, chair of the board, resigned in 1921, and Watkins was selected to replace him as chair; Watkins served as chair until he left the board. Watkins and Stockman were reelected in 1925, but Watkins chose to not seek reelection in 1931.

John A. Doelle, the commissioner of the Michigan Department of Agriculture, tendered his resignation on January 4, 1923. Governor Alex J. Groesbeck appointed Watkins to replace him on February 1, and the state senate approved his nomination on February 7. He was director of the Michigan Department of Agriculture and Rural Development from 1926 to 1928. Governor Fred W. Green appointed Herbert E. Powell to replace Watkins as commissioner of agriculture on February 3, 1927.

== Personal life ==
On June 28, 1899, Watkins married Grace Edith Alley, with whom he had four children, in Dexter, Michigan. Watkins died in Tecumseh, Michigan, on September 17, 1950, and was buried in Oak Grove Cemetery in Manchester, Michigan, on September 19. When Whitney died he was treasurer of the Michigan Insurance Company. Grace died on July 30, 1956.

== Political positions ==
The direct election for members of the United States Senate was supported by Watkins. In 1907, he called for the creation of a referendum system and recall elections. In 1909, he proposed to have the Michigan Highway Commission be an elected office. He supported women's suffrage.

Watkins supported the use of capital punishment. He opposed reciprocity with Canada and a resolution he proposed against it in 1911, stated that Canadian agriculture was a menace to American farmers. He supported the passage of the McNary–Haugen Farm Relief Bill.

== Electoral history ==
1925 Michigan Board of Agriculture election
Party	Candidate	Votes	%
Republican	L. Whitney Watkins (incumbent)	87,596	38.56%
Republican	Dora Hall Stockman (incumbent)	87,552	38.54%
Democratic	Benjamin Halstead	27,291	12.01%
Democratic	Minnie Kaltenbrun	24,733	10.89%
Total votes		227,172	100.00%

== Works cited ==
=== Books ===
- Beal, W. (1915). History of the Michigan Agricultural College and Biographical Sketches of Trustees and Professors. Michigan Agricultural College.
- Martindale, Frederick (1912). Michigan Official Directory and Legislative Manual for the Years 1911-1912. Michigan Secretary of State.
- Peters, Roger (1991). Michigan Manual 1991-1992. The Legislative Service Bureau. ISBN 1878210041.
- Vaughan, Coleman (1915). Michigan Official Directory and Legislative Manual for the Years 1915 and 1916. Michigan Secretary of State.

=== News ===
- "Advocates The Direct Vote". Saginaw Courier-Herald. December 13, 1906. p. 1 – via Newspapers.com.
- "Appoints Detroit Man Bank Director". The Grand Rapids Press. May 29, 1937. p. 11 – via Newspapers.com.
- "Boom Watkins For Governor". Battle Creek Enquirer. January 18, 1914. p. 1 – via Newspapers.com.
- "Clash In Capitol". The Flint Journal. April 14, 1909. p. 1 – via Newspapers.com.
- "Death Claims Veteran of State Political Wars". Detroit Free Press. September 18, 1950. p. 30 – via Newspapers.com.
- "Death Sentence Is Not Favored". The Saginaw News. December 13, 1906. p. 8 – via Newspapers.com.
- "Drys Defeat Beer Issue By 207,000". The Herald-Press. April 29, 1919. p. 5 – via Newspapers.com.
- "East Lansing". Kalamazoo Gazette. November 8, 1931. p. 3 – via Newspapers.com.
- "Farmers Are In Saddle At AG College". Jackson Citizen Patriot. November 17, 1921. p. 1 – via Newspapers.com.
- "Farmers Realize Dream of Years". The Grand Rapids Press. January 1, 1920. p. 2 – via Newspapers.com.
- "Gift-Grain Relief For Near East Launched From Historic Farm Of L. Whitney Watkins". The Times Herald. September 20, 1921. p. 10 – via Newspapers.com.
- "G.O.P. Ticket Sweeps State By 3 To 1 Vote". Detroit Free Press. April 7, 1925. p. 1 – via Newspapers.com.
- "Gov. Ferris Names Peace Delegates". Jackson Citizen Patriot. February 18, 1913. p. 1 – via Newspapers.com.
- "Harmony Rules G.O.P." Lansing State Journal. April 4, 1931. p. 2 – via Newspapers.com.
- "Ionian Farmer Is Named By Governor". The Saginaw News. February 3, 1927. p. 1 – via Newspapers.com.
- "Issue Call For State Convention". Jackson Citizen Patriot. July 10, 1912. p. 1 – via Newspapers.com.
- "Jackson County News". Jackson Citizen Patriot. July 8, 1899. p. 6 – via Newspapers.com.
- "Jackson Farmers Have Organized A Farm Bureau". Jackson Patriot. March 24, 1918. p. 6 – via Newspapers.com.
- "Jackson Solid For Roosevelt Watkins Says". The Ann Arbor News. March 21, 1912. p. 1 – via Newspapers.com.
- "L.W. Watkins President". Lansing State Journal. December 13, 1905. p. 1 – via Newspapers.com.
- "L. Whitney Watkins, Bull Moose Leader, Back In The G.O.P." Jackson Citizen Patriot. March 24, 1915. p. 1 – via Newspapers.com.
- "L. Whitney Watkins, Farm Leader, Dies". Jackson Citizen Patriot. September 18, 1950. p. 1 – via Newspapers.com.
- "L. Whitney Watkins Is Progressives' Choice For The Governorship". Jackson Citizen Patriot. July 22, 1912. p. 1 – via Newspapers.com.
- "L. Whitney Watkins of Manchester Made Commissioner of Agriculture". Battle Creek Enquirer. February 1, 1923. p. 1 – via Newspapers.com.
- "Liberty Loan Committees Are Named In Townships". Jackson Citizen Patriot. June 1, 1917. p. 9 – via Newspapers.com.
- "Make Laws Direct". The Herald-Press. February 28, 1907. p. 1 – via Newspapers.com.
- "Manchester Man Is Named Bank Director". Jackson Citizen Patriot. January 3, 1942. p. 4 – via Newspapers.com.
- "Many Moose To Go To Battle Creek". Jackson Citizen Patriot. February 17, 1913. p. 8 – via Newspapers.com.
- "Marston Back on M.A.C. Board". Lansing State Journal. January 5, 1905. p. 5 – via Newspapers.com.
- "Mrs. L. V. Watkins, 80, Solon's Widow, Dies". The Grand Rapids Press. August 1, 1956. p. 17 – via Newspapers.com.
- "Name Watkins Bank Director". The Grand Rapids Press. December 31, 1938. p. 7 – via Newspapers.com.
- "Not A Candidate". Battle Creek Enquirer. May 21, 1912. p. 1 – via Newspapers.com.
- "Opposed To Reciprocity". The Flint Journal. February 3, 1911. p. 5 – via Newspapers.com.
- "Osborn Best Man to Nominate". Owosso Times. August 26, 1910. p. 4 – via Newspapers.com.
- "Progressives of Jackson Repudiate Taft's Nomination". Jackson Citizen Patriot. July 18, 1912. p. 1 – via Newspapers.com.
- "Second For Roosevelt". Battle Creek Enquirer. April 10, 1912. p. 2 – via Newspapers.com.
- "State AG Leaders Back Relief Bills". Dowagiac Daily News. May 1, 1926. p. 1 – via Newspapers.com.
- "State Convention". The Herald-Press. May 18, 1904. p. 1 – via Newspapers.com.
- "State Grange Candidates Nominated". Jackson Citizen Patriot. February 19, 1919. p. 2 – via Newspapers.com.
- "The Senate Committees". Lansing State Journal. January 11, 1899. p. 1 – via Newspapers.com.
- "Third Party Is Born; T.R. Electors Named". Detroit Free Press. July 20, 1912. p. 1 – via Newspapers.com.
- "Want Osborn To Run Again For Governor". The Ann Arbor News. July 20, 1912. p. 1 – via Newspapers.com.
- "Watkins Boomed For State Berth". The Flint Journal. January 6, 1923. p. 1 – via Newspapers.com.
- "Watkins Jollies Women". The Flint Journal. August 15, 1912. p. 6 – via Newspapers.com.
- "Watkins Not To Seek Gubernatorial Honor". Detroit Free Press. March 26, 1920. p. 19 – via Newspapers.com.
- "Watkins Refuses To Be Candidate". Lansing State Journal. January 5, 1920. p. 1 – via Newspapers.com.
- "Watkins Says He Does Not Plan To Run For Governor". Niles Daily Star. May 31, 1928. p. 15 – via Newspapers.com.
- "Watkins Will Not Be Candidate". The Grand Rapids Press. June 4, 1914. p. 2 – via Newspapers.com.
- "Will Vote For Watkins". Battle Creek Enquirer. August 14, 1912. p. 2 – via Newspapers.com.
- Kern, Armstrong (February 7, 1923). "Watkins Appointment Approved By Senate". Kalamazoo Gazette. p. 2 – via Newspapers.com.
- Tinkham, Henry (June 12, 1914). "Watkins Will Back Osborn For Governor". The Grand Rapids Press. p. 1 – via Newspapers.com.

=== Web ===
- "L. Whitney Watkins Papers". Michigan State University. Archived from the original on January 17, 2025.
- "Legislator Details". Michigan Department of Education. Archived from the original on July 16, 2023.
- "View a list of MDA directors both past and present". Michigan Department of Agriculture and Rural Development. Archived from the original on June 16, 2012.

Party political offices
First	Progressive nominee for Governor of Michigan; 1912	Succeeded by Henry R. Pattengill
