= 1912 Michigan gubernatorial election =

- November 5, 1912
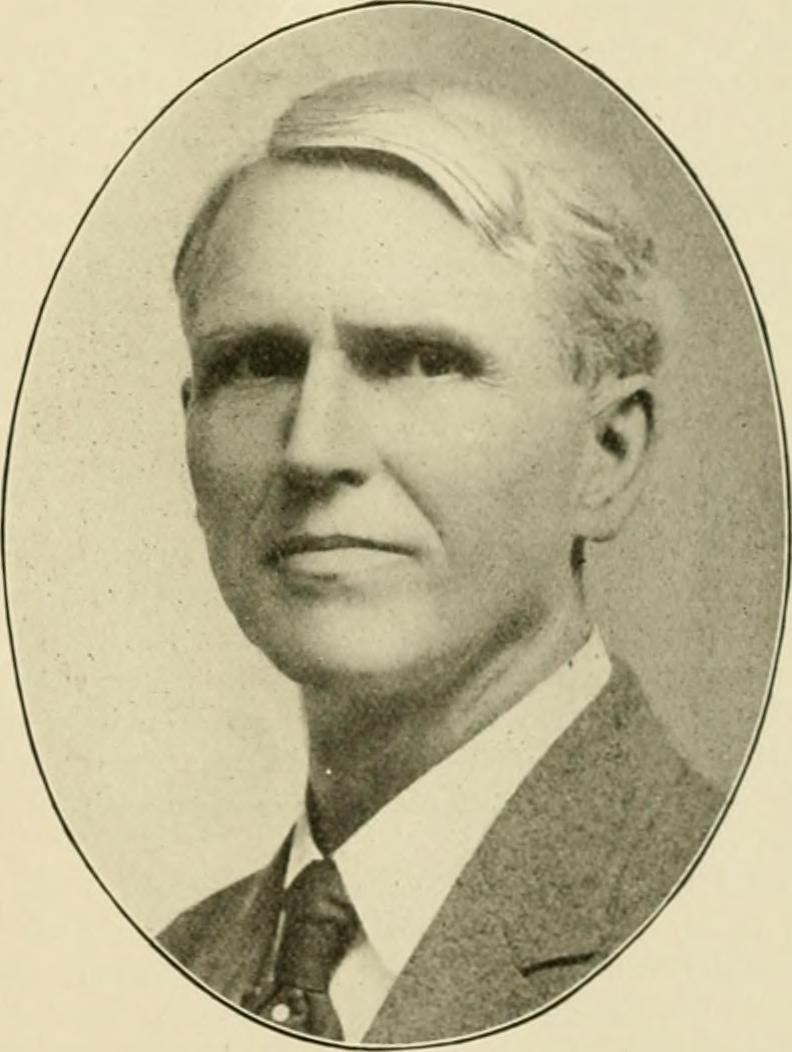

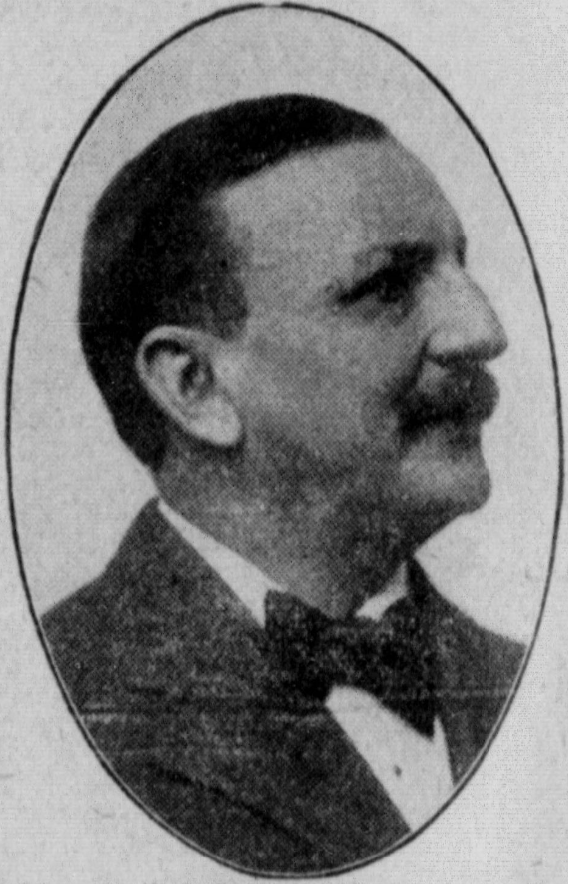

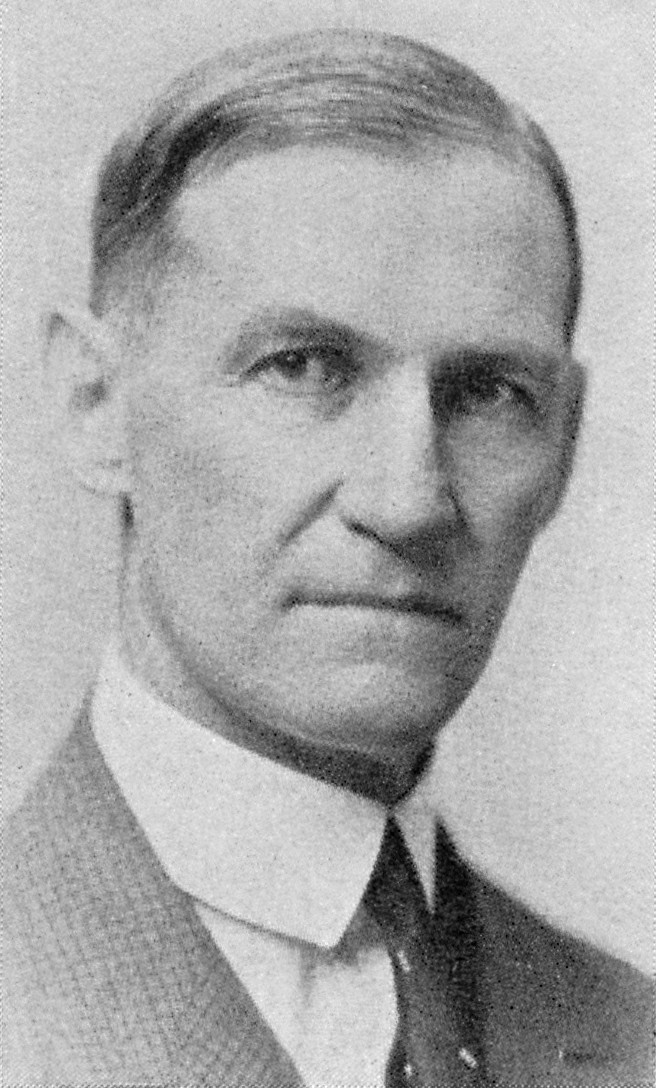
Nominee	Woodbridge N. Ferris	Amos S. Musselman	Lucius Whitney Watkins
Party	Democratic	Republican	Progressive
Popular vote	194,017	169,963	155,372
Percentage	35.35%	30.96%	28.31%
- County results Ferris: 30–40% 40–50% Musselman: 30–40% 40–50% Watkins: 30–40% 40–50%
Governor before election
Chase S. Osborn
Republican
Elected Governor
Woodbridge N. Ferris
Democratic

The 1912 Michigan gubernatorial election was held on November 5, 1912. Democratic nominee Woodbridge N. Ferris defeated Republican candidate Amos S. Musselman and Progressive candidate Lucius Whitney Watkins with 35.35% of the vote.

== Primary election ==
Michigan held primary elections on August 27, 1912.

=== Republican party ===
Incumbent governor Chase S. Osborn declined to seek a second term. Amos S. Musselman narrowly defeated Frederick C. Martindale for the Republican nomination.

==== Candidates ====
- Frederick C. Martindale, Michigan Secretary of State
- Amos S. Musselman, businessman from Grand Rapids

==== Results ====
Republican primary results
Party	Candidate	Votes	%
Republican	Amos S. Musselman	86,191	51.03%
Republican	Frederick C. Martindale	82,714	48.97%
Total votes		168,905	100.00%

=== Democratic party ===
Woodbridge N. Ferris was unopposed for the Democratic nomination.

==== Candidates ====
- Woodbridge N. Ferris, Democratic nominee for governor in 1904

==== Results ====
Democratic primary results
Party	Candidate	Votes	%
Democratic	Woodbridge N. Ferris	39,457	100.00%
Total votes		39,457	100.00%

=== National Progressive party ===
After the national Republican convention nominated William Howard Taft over Theodore Roosevelt, Lucius Whitney Watkins became chair of Michigan's Progressive Party and was subsequently nominated for governor.

==== Candidates ====
- Lucius Whitney Watkins, member of Michigan Senate

==== Results ====
National Progressive primary results
Party	Candidate	Votes	%
Progressive	Lucius Whitney Watkins	9,770	100.00%
Total votes		9,770	100.00%

=== Minor parties ===
Socialist primary results
Party	Candidate	Votes	%
Socialist	James Hoogerhyde	3,461	100.00%
Total votes		3,461	100.00%

Prohibition primary results
Party	Candidate	Votes	%
Prohibition	J. D. Leland	2,115	100.00%
Total votes		2,115	100.00%

Socialist Labor primary results
Party	Candidate	Votes	%
Socialist Labor	Herman Richter	109	100.00%
Total votes		109	100.00%

== General election ==
=== Candidates ===
Major party candidates

- Woodbridge N. Ferris, Democratic
- Amos S. Musselman, Republican

Other candidates

- Lucius Whitney Watkins, National Progressive
- James Hoogerhyde, Socialist
- J. D. Leland, Prohibition
- Herman Richter, Socialist Labor

=== Results ===
1912 Michigan gubernatorial election
Party	Candidate	Votes	%	±%
Democratic	Woodbridge N. Ferris	194,017	35.35%	−6.29%
Republican	Amos S. Musselman	169,963	30.96%	−21.88%
Progressive	Lucius Whitney Watkins	155,372	28.31%	
Socialist	James Hoogerhyde	21,398	3.90%	+1.29%
Prohibition	J. D. Leland	7,811	1.42%	−1.18%
Socialist Labor	Herman Richter	359	0.07%	−0.25%
	Scattering	1	0.00%	
Plurality		24,054	4.38%	
Total votes		548,921	100.00%	
Democratic gain from Republican		Swing	+15.60%	

==== Results by county ====
Kalkaska County, Mecosta County, and Wexford County voted Democratic for the first time ever in this election. Kalkaska County would not vote Democratic again until 1974, while Emmet County and Wexford County would not vote Democratic again until 1986. The following counties did not vote Republican for the first since their respective organizations: Alger, Antrim, Gogebic, Kalkaska, Lake, Mecosta, and Wexford. Ferris was the first Democrat to be elected governor without carrying St. Clair County.

County	Woodbridge N. Ferris Democratic		Amos S. Musselman Republican		L. Whitney Watkins Progressive		James Hoogerhyde Socialist		J. D. Leland Prohibition		Herman Richter Socialist Labor		Margin (Note: Because this election was a three-way race, there is considerable variation in who placed first, second, and third in each county. All margins are Ferris over Musselman unless otherwise noted.)		Total votes cast
County	#	%	#	%	#	%	#	%	#	%	#	%	#	%	Total votes cast
Alcona	223	22.82%	284	29.07%	395	40.43%	69	7.06%	6	0.61%	0	0.00%	-111 (Note: Watkins' margin over Musselman)	-11.36%	977
Alger	343	31.44%	290	26.58%	391	35.84%	50	4.58%	17	1.56%	0	0.00%	-48 (Note: Watkins' margin over Ferris)	-4.40%	1,091
Allegan	2,356	30.69%	2,598	33.84%	2,309	30.07%	274	3.57%	116	1.51%	25	0.33%	-242	-3.15%	7,678
Alpena	1,377	38.66%	987	27.71%	1,121	31.47%	56	1.57%	21	0.59%	0	0.00%	256 (Note: Ferris's margin over Watkins)	7.19%	3,562
Antrim	748	29.92%	736	29.44%	828	33.12%	151	6.04%	37	1.48%	0	0.00%	-80	-3.20%	2,500
Arenac	662	33.23%	424	21.29%	757	38.00%	106	5.32%	43	2.16%	0	0.00%	-95	-4.77%	1,992
Baraga	295	26.04%	328	28.95%	459	40.51%	36	3.18%	15	1.32%	0	0.00%	-131	-11.56%	1,133
Barry	2,187	39.81%	1,798	32.73%	1,313	23.90%	93	1.69%	103	1.87%	0	0.00%	389	7.08%	5,494
Bay	3,506	31.65%	2,834	25.59%	3,993	36.05%	501	4.52%	242	2.18%	0	0.00%	-487	-4.40%	11,076
Benzie	536	27.96%	594	30.99%	454	23.68%	239	12.47%	89	4.64%	5	0.26%	-58	-3.03%	1,917
Berrien	4,518	37.80%	3,315	27.74%	3,529	29.53%	435	3.64%	154	1.29%	0	0.00%	979	8.28%	11,951
Branch	2,653	42.95%	1,865	30.19%	1,419	22.97%	142	2.30%	98	1.59%	0	0.00%	788	12.76%	6,177
Calhoun	4,409	33.82%	3,581	27.47%	3,749	28.76%	974	7.47%	200	1.53%	122	0.94%	660	5.06%	13,035
Cass	2,208	40.85%	1,796	33.23%	1,003	18.56%	328	6.07%	70	1.30%	0	0.00%	412	7.62%	5,405
Charlevoix	1,114	30.62%	1,349	37.08%	769	21.14%	368	10.12%	38	1.04%	0	0.00%	-235	-6.46%	3,638
Cheboygan	1,305	40.57%	904	28.10%	862	26.80%	115	3.57%	28	0.87%	3	0.09%	401	12.47%	3,217
Chippewa	1,285	35.38%	851	23.43%	1,240	34.14%	154	4.24%	102	2.81%	0	0.00%	45	1.24%	3,632
Clare	573	31.59%	589	32.47%	508	28.00%	118	6.50%	26	1.43%	0	0.00%	-16	-0.88%	1,814
Clinton	2,309	42.68%	1,796	33.20%	1,209	22.35%	25	0.46%	71	1.31%	0	0.00%	513	9.48%	5,410
Crawford	358	48.44%	216	29.23%	130	17.59%	30	4.06%	5	0.68%	0	0.00%	142	19.22%	739
Delta	1,254	28.49%	1,177	26.74%	1,713	38.91%	220	5.00%	38	0.86%	0	0.00%	-459	-10.43%	4,402
Dickinson	436	13.03%	1,449	43.32%	1,166	34.86%	252	7.53%	42	1.26%	0	0.00%	-283 (Note: Musselman's margin over Watkins)	-8.46%	3,345
Eaton	3,253	44.60%	2,452	33.62%	1,409	19.32%	92	1.26%	88	1.21%	0	0.00%	801	10.98%	7,294
Emmet	1,294	38.75%	970	29.05%	662	19.83%	365	10.93%	48	1.44%	0	0.00%	324	9.70%	3,339
Genesee	4,440	33.38%	3,551	26.70%	4,428	33.29%	643	4.83%	207	1.56%	32	0.24%	12	0.09%	13,301
Gladwin	407	25.03%	667	41.02%	442	27.18%	82	5.04%	24	1.48%	4	0.25%	-225	-13.84%	1,626
Gogebic	698	22.99%	851	28.03%	1,211	39.89%	122	4.02%	154	5.07%	0	0.00%	-360	-11.86%	3,036
Grand Traverse	1,344	34.44%	1,153	29.54%	1,106	28.34%	249	6.38%	51	1.31%	0	0.00%	191	4.89%	3,903
Gratiot	2,367	40.21%	2,130	36.18%	1,288	21.88%	31	0.53%	71	1.21%	0	0.00%	237	4.03%	5,887
Hillsdale	2,606	37.49%	1,600	23.02%	2,551	36.70%	48	0.69%	146	2.10%	0	0.00%	55	0.79%	6,951
Houghton	2.618	21.64%	4,458	36.86%	4,248	35.12%	416	3.44%	356	2.94%	0	0.00%	-210	-1.76%	12,096
Huron	1,817	28.66%	2,099	33.11%	2,305	36.36%	62	0.98%	57	0.90%	0	0.00%	-206	-3.25%	6,340
Ingham	5,221	39.52%	3,328	25.19%	3,782	28.63%	528	4.00%	291	2.20%	60	0.45%	1,439	10.89%	13,210
Ionia	3,565	46.20%	2,740	35.51%	1,133	14.68%	142	1.84%	136	1.76%	0	0.00%	825	10.69%	7,716
Iosco	617	34.32%	521	28.98%	614	34.15%	27	1.50%	19	1.06%	0	0.00%	3	0.17%	1,798
Iron	315	13.83%	1,113	48.86%	718	31.52%	109	4.78%	23	1.01%	0	0.00%	-395	-17.34%	2,278
Isabella	2,002	41.92%	1,489	31.18%	1,116	23.37%	112	2.35%	55	1.15%	2	0.04%	513	10.74%	4,776
Jackson	4,892	37.31%	2,377	18.13%	5,329	40.64%	341	2.60%	173	1.32%	0	0.00%	-437	-3.33%	13,112
Kalamazoo	4,240	34.23%	3,251	26.25%	3,073	24.81%	1,411	11.39%	366	2.95%	46	0.37%	959	7.98%	12,387
Kalkaska	510	36.77%	439	31.65%	306	22.06%	96	6.92%	36	2.60%	0	0.00%	71	5.12%	1,387
Kent	11,794	37.14%	10,357	32.62%	7,405	23.32%	1,808	5.69%	388	1.22%	0	0.00%	1,437	4.53%	31,752
Keweenaw	81	7.29%	544	48.96%	434	39.06%	36	3.24%	16	1.44%	0	0.00%	-110	-9.90%	1,111
Lake	257	27.58%	290	31.12%	341	36.59%	40	4.29%	4	0.43%	0	0.00%	-51	-5.47%	932
Lapeer	1,662	30.56%	2,086	38.36%	1,554	28.58%	35	0.64%	101	1.86%	0	0.00%	-424	-7.80%	5,438
Leelanau	492	27.95%	675	38.35%	500	28.41%	75	4.26%	18	1.02%	0	0.00%	-175	-9.94%	1,760
Lenawee	4,554	41.11%	3,268	29.50%	2,932	26.47%	131	1.18%	192	1.73%	0	0.00%	1,286	11.61%	11,077
Livingston	2,326	46.97%	1,536	31.02%	988	19.95%	11	0.22%	91	1.84%	0	0.00%	790	15.95%	4,952
Luce	179	28.50%	274	43.63%	158	25.16%	8	1.27%	9	1.43%	0	0.00%	-95	-15.13%	628
Mackinac	869	49.15%	600	33.94%	276	15.61%	0	0.00%	21	1.19%	2	0.11%	269	15.21%	1,768
Macomb	3,290	45.04%	2,730	37.38%	1,158	15.85%	26	0.36%	100	1.37%	0	0.00%	560	7.67%	7,304
Manistee	2,176	46.16%	1,341	28.45%	875	18.56%	261	5.54%	61	1.29%	0	0.00%	835	17.71%	4,714
Marquette	1,281	16.37%	2,666	34.08%	3,286	42.00%	489	6.25%	101	1.29%	0	0.00%	-1,203	-7.92%	7,823
Mason	1,391	35.35%	1,143	29.05%	1,150	29.22%	160	4.07%	91	2.31%	0	0.00%	241	6.12%	3,935
Mecosta	1,803	45.77%	1,102	27.98%	871	22.11%	109	2.77%	54	1.37%	0	0.00%	701	17.80%	3,939
Menominee	1,440	32.58%	1,207	27.31%	1,560	35.29%	181	4.10%	32	0.72%	0	0.00%	-120	-2.71%	4,420
Midland	783	24.98%	987	31.48%	1,292	41.21%	32	1.02%	34	1.08%	7	0.22%	-305	-9.73%	3,135
Missaukee	568	27.75%	777	37.96%	607	29.65%	68	3.32%	26	1.27%	0	0.00%	-170	-8.31%	2,047 (Note: Includes 1 write-in vote for Thomas Sunderland)
Monroe	3,239	44.47%	2,427	33.32%	1,465	20.11%	56	0.77%	89	1.22%	8	0.11%	812	11.15%	7,284
Montcalm	2,151	33.10%	2,393	36.82%	1,597	24.57%	253	3.89%	105	1.62%	0	0.00%	-242	-3.72%	6,499
Montmorency	203	27.18%	360	48.19%	167	22.36%	15	2.01%	2	0.27%	0	0.00%	-157	-21.02%	747
Muskegon	2,033	24.86%	1,854	22.67%	3,647	44.60%	587	7.18%	56	0.68%	0	0.00%	-1,614	-19.74%	8,177
Newaygo	1,241	31.63%	1,185	30.20%	1,230	31.35%	205	5.22%	63	1.61%	0	0.00%	11	0.28%	3,924
Oakland	4,707	41.13%	4,161	36.36%	2,178	19.03%	192	1.68%	207	1.81%	0	0.00%	546	4.77%	11,455
Oceana	1,225	32.84%	1,098	29.44%	1,216	32.60%	88	2.36%	103	2.76%	0	0.00%	9	0.24%	3,730
Ogemaw	430	25.10%	582	33.98%	586	34.21%	72	4.20%	43	2.51%	0	0.00%	-4	-0.24%	1,713
Ontonagon	392	22.39%	779	44.49%	427	24.39%	131	7.48%	22	1.26%	0	0.00%	-352	-20.10%	1,751
Osceola	1,132	32.10%	1,432	40.60%	806	22.85%	82	2.32%	75	2.13%	0	0.00%	-300	-8.51%	3,527
Oscoda	74	21.51%	131	38.08%	137	39.83%	1	0.29%	1	0.29%	0	0.00%	-6	-1.75%	344
Otsego	415	39.45%	369	35.08%	250	23.76%	6	0.57%	12	1.14%	0	0.00%	46	4.37%	1,052
Ottawa	2,620	29.96%	2,731	31.23%	2,990	34.19%	300	3.43%	103	1.18%	0	0.00%	-259	-2.96%	8,744
Presque Isle	458	23.40%	820	41.90%	615	31.43%	56	2.86%	8	0.41%	0	0.00%	-205	-10.47%	1,957
Roscommon	251	41.28%	143	23.52%	178	29.28%	26	4.28%	9	1.48%	1	0.16%	73	12.01%	608
Saginaw	6,691	37.11%	5,613	31.13%	4,309	23.90%	1,267	7.03%	151	0.84%	0	0.00%	1,078	5.98%	18,031
Sanilac	1,905	26.57%	2,734	38.13%	2,051	28.60%	227	3.17%	254	3.54%	0	0.00%	-683	-9.53%	7,171
Schoolcraft	423	22.60%	659	35.20%	439	23.45%	241	12.87%	110	5.88%	0	0.00%	-220	-11.75%	1,872
Shiawassee	2,540	33.38%	2,324	30.54%	2,344	30.81%	305	4.01%	83	1.09%	13	0.17%	196	2.58%	7,609
St. Clair	3,762	35.22%	2,966	27.77%	3,814	35.71%	56	0.52%	83	0.78%	0	0.00%	-52	-0.49%	10,681
St. Joseph	2,713	44.54%	1,388	22.79%	1,932	31.72%	39	0.64%	10	0.16%	9	0.15%	781	12.82%	6,091
Tuscola	1,762	23.89%	2,674	36.25%	2,756	37.36%	55	0.75%	129	1.75%	0	0.00%	-82	-1.11%	7,376
Van Buren	2,248	30.98%	2,393	32.98%	2,294	31.61%	236	3.25%	86	1.19%	0	0.00%	-99	-1.37%	7,257
Washtenaw	4,959	46.70%	2,705	25.47%	2,683	25.27%	115	1.08%	137	1.29%	20	0.19%	2,254	21.23%	10,619
Wayne	33,284	37.20%	28,452	31.80%	23,720	26.51%	3,454	3.86%	565	0.63%	0	0.00%	4,832	5.40%	89,475
Wexford	1,352	34.85%	1,057	27.24%	1,116	28.76%	251	6.47%	104	2.68%	0	0.00%	236	6.08%	3,880
Total	194,017	35.35%	169,963	30.96%	155,372	28.30%	21,398	3.90%	7,811	1.42%	359	0.07%	24,054	4.38%	548,921

===== Counties that flipped from Republican to Democratic =====
- Alpena
- Barry
- Calhoun
- Cass
- Cheboygan
- Chippewa
- Clinton
- Crawford
- Emmet
- Genesee
- Grand Traverse
- Gratiot
- Iosco
- Isabella
- Kalkaska
- Kent
- Lenawee
- Mackinac
- Macomb
- Mason
- Mecosta
- Monroe
- Newaygo
- Oakland
- Oceana
- Otsego
- Roscommon
- Saginaw
- Shiawassee
- St. Joseph
- Wayne
- Wexford

===== Counties that flipped from Republican to Progressive =====
- Alcona
- Alger
- Antrim
- Arenac
- Baraga
- Bay
- Delta
- Gogebic
- Huron
- Lake
- Marquette
- Menominee
- Midland
- Muskegon
- Ogemaw
- Oscoda
- Ottawa
- St. Clair
- Tuscola

===== Counties that flipped from Democratic to Progressive =====
- Jackson
