= 1914 Michigan gubernatorial election =

1914 Michigan election

- November 3, 1914
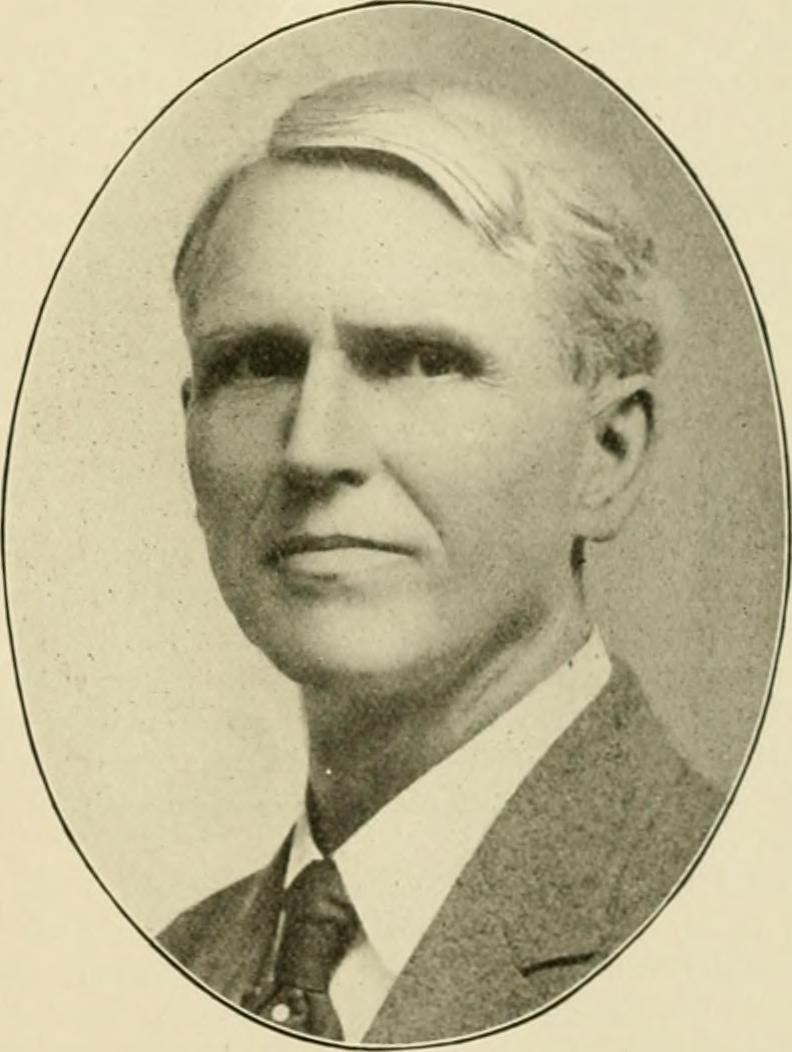

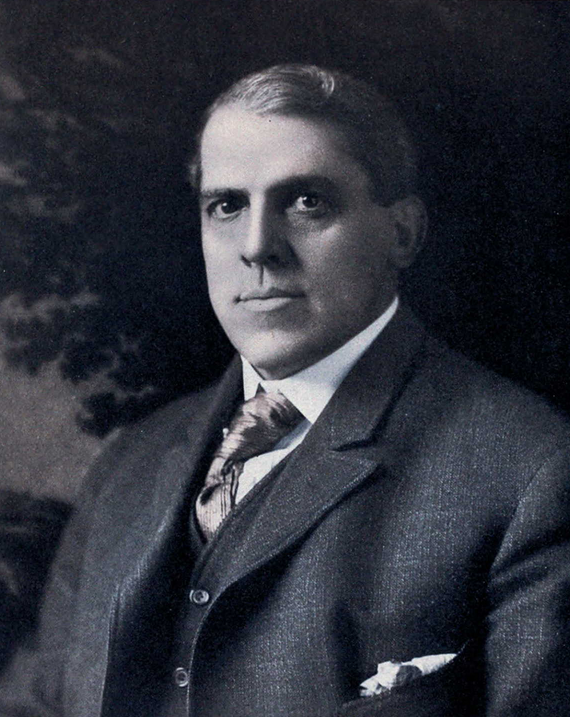

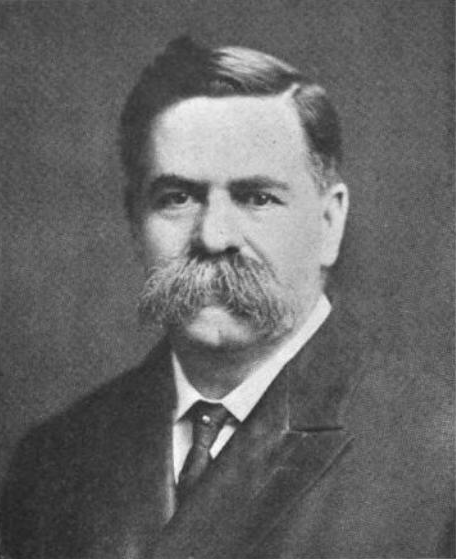
Nominee	Woodbridge N. Ferris	Chase S. Osborn	Henry R. Pattengill
Party	Democratic	Republican	Progressive
Popular vote	212,063	176,254	36,747
Percentage	48.15%	40.02%	8.34%
- County results Ferris: 30–40% 40–50% 50–60% 60–70% 70–80% Osborn: 40–50% 50–60% 60–70%
Governor before election
Woodbridge N. Ferris
Democratic
Elected Governor
Woodbridge N. Ferris
Democratic

The 1914 Michigan gubernatorial election was held on November 3, 1914. Incumbent Democrat Woodbridge N. Ferris defeated Republican candidate Chase S. Osborn with 48.15% of the vote.

== Primary election ==
Michigan held primary elections on August 25, 1914.

=== Democratic party ===
Incumbent governor Woodbridge N. Ferris was renominated without opposition.

==== Candidates ====
- Woodbridge N. Ferris, incumbent governor

==== Results ====
Democratic primary results
Party	Candidate	Votes	%
Democratic	Woodbridge N. Ferris (inc.)	31,302	100.00%
Total votes		31,302	100.00%

=== Republican party ===
Former governor Chase S. Osborn emerged victorious in a crowded primary field.

==== Candidates ====
- George E. Ellis, former member of Michigan House of Representatives
- Alex J. Groesbeck, chairman of the Michigan Republican Party
- William S. Linton, former representative from Michigan's 8th congressional district
- Frederick C. Martindale, former Michigan Secretary of State
- Chase S. Osborn, former governor

==== Results ====
Republican primary results
Party	Candidate	Votes	%
Republican	Chase S. Osborn	58,405	28.89%
Republican	Frederick C. Martindale	47,942	23.71%
Republican	Alex J. Groesbeck	43,137	21.34%
Republican	William S. Linton	30,443	15.06%
Republican	George E. Ellis	22,248	11.00%
Total votes		202,175	100.00%

=== National Progressive party ===
==== Candidates ====
- Henry R. Pattengill, former Michigan Superintendent of Public Instruction

==== Results ====
National Progressive primary results
Party	Candidate	Votes	%
Progressive	Henry R. Pattengill	7,000	100.00%
Total votes		7,000	100.00%

=== Minor parties ===
Socialist primary results
Party	Candidate	Votes	%
Socialist	James Hoogerhyde	2,742	100.00%
Total votes		2,742	100.00%

Prohibition primary results
Party	Candidate	Votes	%
Prohibition	Charles N. Eayrs	852	100.00%
Total votes		852	100.00%

Socialist Labor primary results
Party	Candidate	Votes	%
Socialist Labor	Herman Richter	133	100.00%
Total votes		133	100.00%

== General election ==
=== Candidates ===
Major party candidates

- Woodbridge N. Ferris, Democratic
- Chase S. Osborn, Republican

Other candidates

- Henry R. Pattengill, National Progressive
- James Hoogerhyde, Socialist
- Charles N. Eayrs, Prohibition
- Herman Richter, Socialist Labor

=== Results ===
1914 Michigan gubernatorial election
Party	Candidate	Votes	%	±%
Democratic	Woodbridge N. Ferris (inc.)	212,063	48.15%	+12.80%
Republican	Chase S. Osborn	176,254	40.02%	+9.05%
National Progressive	Henry R. Pattengill	36,747	8.34%	−19.96%
Socialist	James Hoogerhyde	11,056	2.51%	−1.39%
Prohibition	Charles N. Eayrs	3,830	0.87%	−0.55%
Socialist Labor	Herman Richter	497	0.11%	+0.05%
	Scattering	1	0.00%	
Plurality		35,809	8.13%	
Total votes		440,448	100.00%	
Democratic hold		Swing	+3.75%	

==== Results by county ====
Alger County and Luce County voted Democratic for the first time ever. Houghton County voted Democratic for the first time since 1874. After this election, Iosco County, Luce County and Washtenaw County would not Democratic again until 1982, while Mecosta County would not Democratic again until 1986. This was the only election between 1882 and 1940 in which Mason County failed to back the winning candidate.

County	Woodbridge N. Ferris Democratic		Chase S. Osborn Republican		Henry R. Pattengill Progressive		James Hoogerhyde Socialist		Charles N. Eayrs Prohibition		Herman Richter Socialist Labor		Margin		Total votes cast
County	#	%	#	%	#	%	#	%	#	%	#	%	#	%	Total votes cast
Alcona	224	33.84%	339	51.21%	63	9.52%	34	5.14%	2	0.30%	0	0.00%	-115	-17.37%	662
Alger	505	45.13%	347	31.01%	196	17.52%	51	4.56%	20	1.79%	0	0.00%	158	14.12%	1,119
Allegan	2,412	41.32%	2,816	48.24%	407	6.97%	144	2.47%	54	0.93%	4	0.07%	-404	-6.92%	5,837
Alpena	1,481	42.73%	1,769	51.04%	165	4.76%	41	1.18%	9	0.26%	1	0.03%	-288	-8.31%	3,466
Antrim	656	31.30%	871	41.56%	414	19.75%	128	6.11%	27	1.29%	0	0.00%	-215	-10.26%	2,096
Arenac	719	38.20%	832	44.21%	244	12.96%	62	3.29%	22	1.17%	3	0.16%	-113	-6.00%	1,882
Baraga	402	31.19%	658	51.05%	169	13.11%	46	3.57%	13	1.01%	1	0.08%	-256	-19.86%	1,289
Barry	2,127	46.04%	2,224	48.14%	155	3.35%	74	1.60%	36	0.78%	4	0.09%	-97	-2.10%	4,620
Bay	3,777	41.57%	3,432	37.77%	1,511	16.63%	321	3.53%	32	0.35%	13	0.14%	345	3.80%	9,086
Benzie	513	39.71%	541	41.87%	86	6.66%	116	8.98%	36	2.79%	0	0.00%	-28	-2.17%	1,292
Berrien	5,304	51.37%	4,225	40.92%	523	5.07%	144	1.39%	119	1.15%	10	0.10%	1,079	10.45%	10,325
Branch	2,434	49.86%	1,754	35.93%	562	11.51%	73	1.50%	55	1.13%	4	0.08%	680	13.93%	4,882
Calhoun	4,859	53.31%	2,508	27.52%	1,300	14.26%	330	3.62%	93	1.02%	25	0.27%	2,351	25.79%	9,115
Cass	2,138	48.62%	1,945	44.23%	168	3.82%	93	2.12%	46	1.05%	7	0.16%	193	4.39%	4,397
Charlevoix	997	39.39%	1,242	49.07%	98	3.87%	170	6.72%	21	0.83%	3	0.12%	-245	-9.68%	2,531
Cheboygan	1,335	47.17%	1,186	41.91%	209	7.39%	84	2.97%	8	0.28%	8	0.28%	149	5.27%	2,830
Chippewa	1,252	34.50%	2,139	58.94%	129	3.55%	73	2.01%	33	0.91%	3	0.08%	-887	-24.44%	3,629
Clare	750	43.63%	746	43.40%	157	9.13%	57	3.32%	8	0.47%	0	0.00%	4	0.23%	1,719 (Note: Includes 1 write-in vote for W. M. Harris)
Clinton	2,146	46.40%	2,090	45.19%	340	7.35%	29	0.63%	20	0.43%	0	0.00%	56	1.21%	4,625
Crawford	448	59.57%	204	27.13%	76	10.11%	20	2.66%	4	0.53%	0	0.00%	244	32.45%	752
Delta	1,405	34.96%	2,080	51.75%	307	7.64%	191	4.75%	28	0.70%	8	0.20%	-675	-16.80%	4,019
Dickinson	662	20.28%	1,655	50.69%	706	21.62%	213	6.52%	25	0.77%	4	0.12%	-949 (Note: Osborn's margin over Pattengill)	-29.07%	3,265
Eaton	2,945	50.14%	2,522	42.93%	315	5.36%	50	0.85%	38	0.65%	4	0.07%	423	7.20%	5,874
Emmet	1,053	42.86%	1,085	44.16%	82	3.34%	212	8.63%	21	0.85%	4	0.16%	-32	-1.30%	2,457
Genesee	4,906	51.59%	3,143	33.05%	1,095	11.51%	258	2.71%	92	0.97%	16	0.17%	1,763	18.54%	9,510
Gladwin	416	31.73%	618	47.14%	215	16.40%	46	3.51%	16	1.22%	0	0.00%	-202	-15.41%	1,311
Gogebic	861	28.13%	1,528	49.92%	485	15.84%	105	3.43%	77	2.52%	5	0.16%	-667	-21.79%	3,061
Grand Traverse	1,355	46.32%	1,089	37.23%	305	10.43%	148	5.06%	25	0.85%	3	0.10%	266	9.09%	2,925
Gratiot	2,349	47.13%	2,250	45.14%	294	5.90%	38	0.76%	48	0.96%	5	0.10%	99	1.99%	4,984
Hillsdale	2,254	42.97%	1,950	37.18%	900	17.16%	31	0.59%	109	2.08%	1	0.02%	304	5.80%	5,245
Houghton	4,832	45.62%	3,808	35.96%	1,500	14.16%	273	2.58%	171	1.61%	7	0.07%	1,024	9.67%	10,591
Huron	2,060	37.88%	2,391	43.97%	879	16.16%	72	1.32%	35	0.64%	1	0.02%	-331	-6.09%	5,438
Ingham	5,420	48.13%	3,877	34.43%	1,446	12.84%	423	3.76%	75	0.67%	21	0.19%	-1,543	-13.70%	11,262
Ionia	3,325	51.06%	2,844	43.67%	169	2.60%	97	1.49%	75	1.15%	2	0.03%	481	7.39%	6,512
Iosco	637	38.84%	573	34.94%	404	24.63%	18	1.10%	7	0.43%	1	0.06%	64	3.90%	1,640
Iron	418	19.23%	1,507	69.32%	138	6.35%	82	3.77%	24	1.10%	5	0.23%	-1,089	50.09%	2,174
Isabella	1,749	45.99%	1,660	43.65%	293	7.70%	62	1.63%	37	0.97%	2	0.05%	89	2.34%	3,803
Jackson	4,290	42.35%	3,789	37.40%	1,786	17.63%	199	1.96%	61	0.60%	5	0.05%	501	4.95%	10,130
Kalamazoo	5,414	55.10%	3,070	31.25%	630	6.41%	509	5.18%	188	1.91%	14	0.14%	2,344	23.86%	9,825
Kalkaska	341	42.68%	348	43.55%	50	6.26%	42	5.26%	16	2.00%	2	0.25%	-7	-0.88%	799
Kent	11,240	47.12%	10,686	44.80%	919	3.85%	752	3.15%	235	0.99%	22	0.09%	554	2.32%	23,854
Keweenaw	291	28.93%	595	59.15%	100	9.94%	13	1.29%	7	0.70%	0	0.00%	-304	-30.22%	1,006
Lake	229	30.95%	409	55.27%	67	9.05%	31	4.19%	3	0.41%	1	0.14%	-180	-24.32%	740
Lapeer	1,942	46.28%	1,970	46.95%	186	4.43%	24	0.57%	72	1.72%	2	0.05%	-28	-0.67%	4,196
Leelanau	574	54.30%	377	35.67%	58	5.49%	40	3.78%	8	0.76%	0	0.00%	197	18.64%	1,057
Lenawee	5,205	56.26%	2,789	30.15%	1,070	11.57%	97	1.05%	77	0.83%	13	0.14%	2,416	26.12%	9,251
Livingston	2,274	50.90%	1,825	40.85%	291	6.51%	21	0.47%	55	1.23%	2	0.04%	449	10.05%	4,468
Luce	463	78.61%	80	13.58%	25	4.24%	14	2.38%	7	1.19%	0	0.00%	383	65.03%	589
Mackinac	1,101	59.71%	660	35.79%	58	3.15%	14	0.76%	8	0.43%	3	0.16%	441	23.92%	1,844
Macomb	3,681	55.93%	2,608	39.62%	193	2.93%	33	0.50%	65	0.99%	2	0.03%	1,073	16.30%	6,582
Manistee	1,942	48.24%	1,659	41.21%	204	5.07%	175	4.35%	42	1.04%	4	0.10%	283	7.03%	4,026
Marquette	1,989	29.10%	3,128	45.77%	1,437	21.03%	231	3.38%	47	0.69%	2	0.03%	-1,139	-16.67%	6,834
Mason	1,080	32.33%	1,658	49.63%	414	12.39%	138	4.13%	45	1.35%	6	0.18%	-578	-17.30%	3,341
Mecosta	1,322	46.16%	1,292	45.11%	118	4.12%	77	2.69%	48	1.68%	7	0.24%	30	1.05%	2,864
Menominee	1,790	44.01%	2,066	50.80%	111	2.73%	81	1.99%	18	0.44%	1	0.02%	-276	-6.79%	4,067
Midland	1,102	41.85%	1,052	39.95%	417	15.84%	33	1.25%	27	1.03%	2	0.08%	50	1.90%	2,633
Missaukee	629	39.29%	791	49.41%	150	9.37%	19	1.19%	10	0.62%	2	0.12%	-162	-10.12%	1,601
Monroe	3,459	54.08%	2,551	39.88%	305	4.77%	29	0.45%	47	0.73%	5	0.08%	908	14.20%	6,396
Montcalm	1,591	37.93%	2,328	55.49%	150	3.58%	87	2.07%	37	0.88%	2	0.05%	-737	-17.57%	4,195
Montmorency	252	49.80%	199	39.33%	28	5.53%	27	5.34%	0	0.00%	0	0.00%	53	10.47%	506
Muskegon	1,800	27.92%	2,863	44.40%	1,397	21.67%	340	5.27%	36	0.56%	12	0.19%	-1,063	-16.49%	6,448
Newaygo	825	30.63%	1,487	55.22%	190	7.06%	155	5.76%	32	1.19%	4	0.15%	-662	-24.58%	2,693
Oakland	5,768	58.64%	3,134	31.86%	716	7.28%	132	1.34%	83	0.84%	4	0.04%	2,634	26.78%	9,837
Oceana	943	33.13%	1,439	50.56%	352	12.37%	70	2.46%	40	1.41%	2	0.07%	-496	-17.43%	2,846
Ogemaw	461	32.98%	570	40.77%	301	21.53%	34	2.43%	32	2.29%	0	0.00%	-109	-7.80%	1,398
Ontonagon	848	45.59%	791	42.53%	117	6.29%	85	4.57%	18	0.97%	1	0.05%	57	3.06%	1,860
Osceola	826	36.71%	1,209	53.73%	165	7.33%	28	1.24%	21	0.93%	1	0.04%	-383	-17.02%	2,250
Oscoda	111	32.46%	165	48.25%	63	18.42%	3	0.88%	0	0.00%	0	0.00%	-54	-15.79%	342
Otsego	439	49.44%	327	36.82%	111	12.50%	7	0.79%	4	0.45%	0	0.00%	112	12.61%	888
Ottawa	2,373	37.31%	3,178	49.97%	581	9.14%	178	2.80%	48	0.75%	2	0.03%	-805	-12.66%	6,360
Presque Isle	609	36.04%	965	57.10%	75	4.44%	37	2.19%	4	0.24%	0	0.00%	-356	-21.07%	1,690
Roscommon	213	37.17%	197	34.38%	153	26.70%	8	1.40%	0	0.00%	2	0.35%	16	2.79%	573
Saginaw	7,430	55.65%	4,933	36.95%	551	4.13%	350	2.62%	65	0.49%	23	0.17%	2,497	18.70%	13,352
Sanilac	1,758	34.30%	2,874	56.07%	388	7.57%	45	0.88%	60	1.17%	1	0.02%	-1,116	-21.77%	5,126
Schoolcraft	442	41.08%	540	50.19%	53	4.93%	30	2.79%	10	0.93%	1	0.09%	-98	-9.11%	1,076
Shiawassee	2,704	47.16%	2,284	39.83%	430	7.50%	180	3.14%	128	2.23%	8	0.14%	420	7.32%	5,734
St. Clair	3,856	44.13%	3,864	44.23%	845	9.67%	117	1.34%	51	0.58%	4	0.05%	-8	-0.09%	8,737
St. Joseph	2,327	46.93%	1,979	39.92%	414	8.35%	186	3.75%	46	0.93%	6	0.12%	348	7.02%	4,958
Tuscola	1,921	42.54%	2,026	44.86%	454	10.05%	77	1.71%	35	0.78%	3	0.07%	-105	-2.33%	4,516
Van Buren	2,287	42.27%	2,618	48.39%	338	6.25%	124	2.29%	39	0.72%	4	0.07%	-331	-6.12%	5,410
Washtenaw	5,757	60.79%	3,059	32.30%	505	5.33%	85	0.90%	60	0.63%	5	0.05%	2,698	28.49%	9,471
Wayne	43,901	62.19%	21,583	30.57%	3,102	4.39%	1,594	2.26%	275	0.39%	139	0.20%	22,318	31.61%	70,594
Wexford	1,137	34.88%	1,791	54.94%	174	5.34%	96	2.94%	59	1.81%	3	0.09%	-654	-20.06%	3,260
Total	212,063	48.15%	176,254	40.02%	36,747	8.34%	11,056	2.51%	3,830	0.87%	497	0.11%	35,809	8.13%	440,448

===== Counties that flipped from Republican to Democratic =====
- Clare
- Houghton
- Leelanau
- Luce
- Montmorency
- Ontonagon

===== Counties that flipped from Progressive to Democratic =====
- Alger
- Bay
- Jackson
- Midland

===== Counties that flipped from Democratic to Republican =====
- Alpena
- Barry
- Chippewa
- Emmet
- Kalkaska
- Mason
- Newaygo
- Oceana
- Wexford

===== Counties that flipped from Republican to Progressive =====
- Alcona
- Antrim
- Arenac
- Baraga
- Delta
- Gogebic
- Huron
- Lake
- Marquette
- Menominee
- Muskegon
- Ogemaw
- Oscoda
- Ottawa
- St. Clair
- Tuscola
