= J. Weston Hutchins =

American politician

Member of the Michigan Senate from the 10th district
- In office January 1, 1913 – 1914
- Preceded by: L. Whitney Watkins
- Succeeded by: Charles J. DeLand

Personal details
- Born: June 14, 1854
- Died: March 5, 1943 (aged 88)
- Party: Progressive
- Spouse: Sarah Elizabeth Lambert

John Weston Hutchins (June 14, 1854 – March 5, 1943) was a Michigan politician.

== Early life ==
Hutchins was born on June 14, 1854.

== Career ==
Hutchins was elected to the Michigan Senate on November 5, 1912. He served from January 1, 1913, to 1914. Hutchins was a member of the Progressive Party. Hutchins was not re-elected in 1914.

== Death ==
Hutchins died on March 5, 1943.
