= Dora Hall Stockman =

American politician (1872–1948)

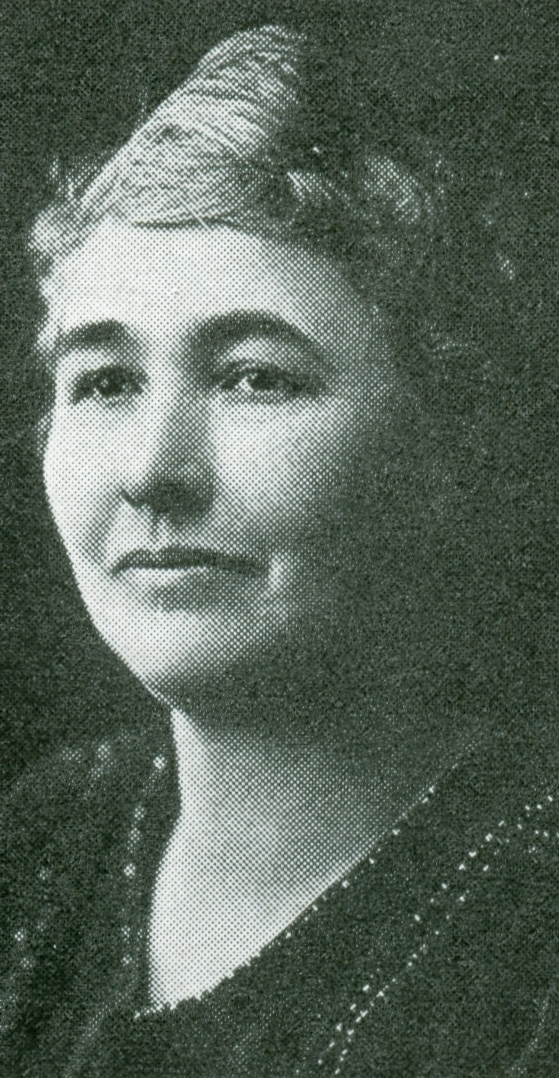

Member of the Michigan House of Representatives
- In office 1939 – 1946

Personal details
- Born: August 4, 1872 Marilla Township, Michigan
- Died: May 25, 1948 (aged 75) Berkeley, California
- Resting place: Hurd Cemetery, DeWitt, Michigan
- Party: Michigan Republican Party
- Spouse: Francis Stockman (m. 1889; died 1936) Gustaf Weinkauf (m. 1947)
- Education: Hillsdale College
- Occupation: Politician

Dora Hall Stockman (August 4, 1872 – May 25, 1948) was an American politician who served as a member of the Michigan House of Representatives for four terms from 1939 to 1946. In 1919, she was elected to the State Board of Agriculture, making her the first woman in Michigan to hold statewide office.

== Biography ==
Stockman was born Eudora Hall on August 4, 1872, to Leander L. and Lucy J. Hall, in Marilla Township, Michigan. She attended Benzonia Academy from 1895 to 1902, and Hillsdale College from 1902 to 1903. She married Francis Stockman in 1889, at the age of 17. She was a member of the Woman's Christian Temperance Union, and advocated for prohibition. In 1913, Governor Woodbridge N. Ferris invited her to serve as a delegate to the International Congress of Farm Women. The following year, she was elected State Grange Lecturer, a position which she held until 1930. Stockman was elected to the State Board of Agriculture in 1919, where she served until 1931. She helped to promote the liberal arts program of Michigan Agricultural College (now Michigan State University).

Stockman ran for a seat in the Michigan House of Representatives in the 1938 general election for Ingham County, winning against her Democratic rival by 3,000 votes. In her first year as a representative, she introduced seventeen bills, and was placed on several committees. She retired from the legislature in 1946 due to complications of diabetes.

Stockman married Gustaf Weinkauf in April 1947. She died on May 25, 1948, at the age of 75.

== Awards and honors ==
In 1934, Michigan State University awarded Stockman an honorary LL.D. degree. In 2006, she was inducted into the Michigan Women's Hall of Fame. A plaque honoring Stockman is located on the campus of Michigan State University.

== Bibliography ==
- O'Rourke-Kelly, Margaret (2008). Phenomenal Woman: The Dora Stockman Story. Zoe Life Pub. ISBN 9781934363188.
