= 1920 Michigan gubernatorial election =

- November 2, 1920
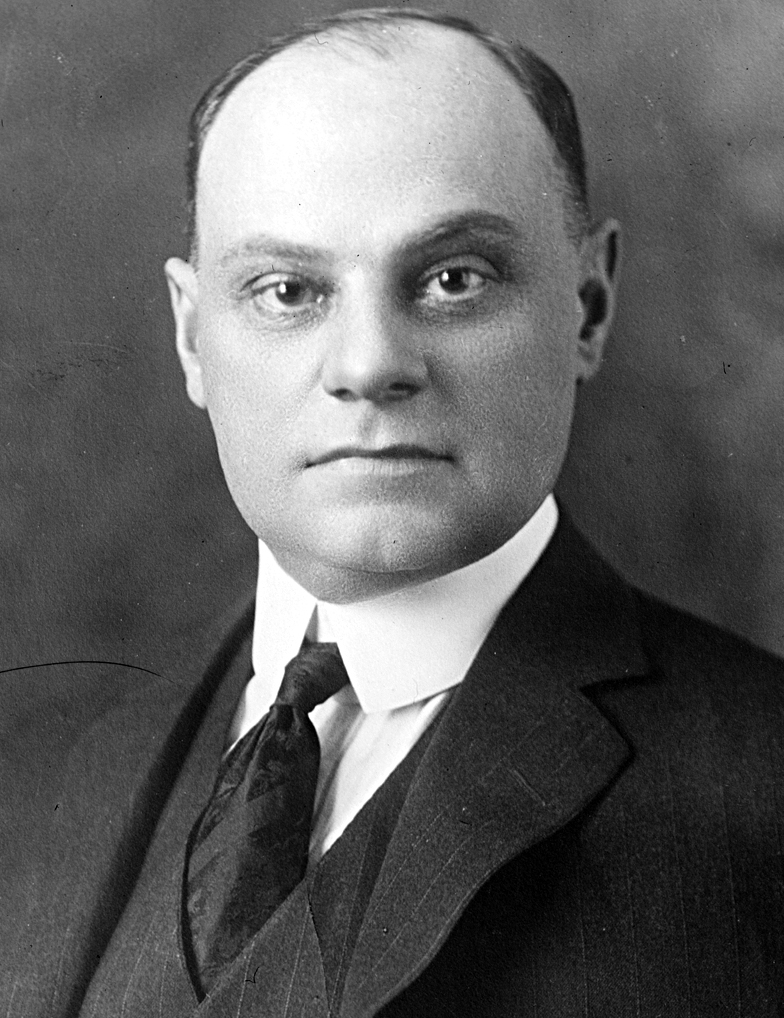

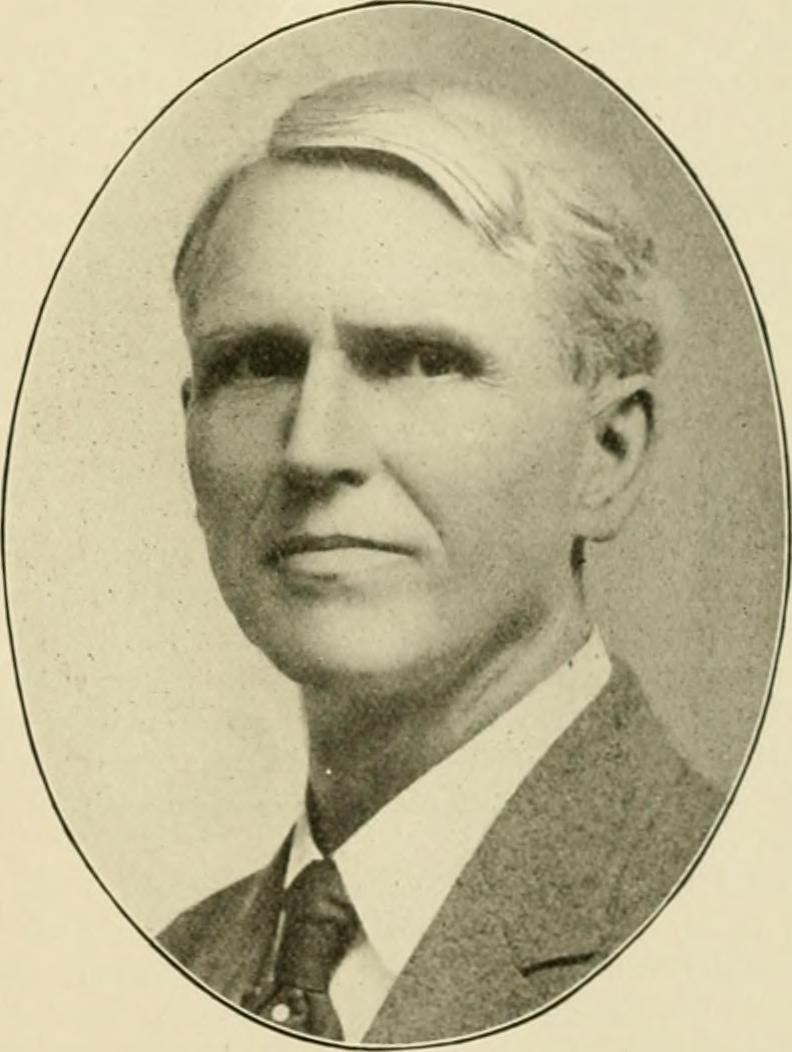
Nominee	Alex J. Groesbeck	Woodbridge N. Ferris
Party	Republican	Democratic
Popular vote	703,180	310,566
Percentage	66.43%	29.34%
- County results Groesbeck: 50–60% 60–70% 70–80% 80–90%
Governor before election
Albert Sleeper
Republican
Elected Governor
Alex J. Groesbeck
Republican

The 1920 Michigan gubernatorial election was held on November 2, 1920. Republican nominee Alex J. Groesbeck defeated Democratic nominee Woodbridge N. Ferris with 66.43% of the vote.

== Primary election ==
Michigan held primary elections on August 31, 1920.

=== Republican party ===
Attorney General Alex J. Groesbeck emerged victorious in a crowded primary field.

==== Candidates ====
- Milo D. Campbell, lawyer and former member of Michigan House of Representatives
- Luren D. Dickinson, Lieutenant Governor of Michigan
- Horatio S. Earle, transport engineer
- Cassius L. Glasgow, former member of Michigan Senate
- Alex J. Groesbeck, Attorney General of Michigan
- James Hamilton
- Frank B. Leland, member of University of Michigan Board of Regents
- Frederick C. Martindale, former Michigan Secretary of State
- Charles S. Mott, former mayor of Flint

==== Results ====
Republican primary results
Party	Candidate	Votes	%
Republican	Alex J. Groesbeck	101,973	28.15%
Republican	Milo D. Campbell	72,692	20.07%
Republican	Charles S. Mott	57,473	15.87%
Republican	Frank B. Leland	30,322	8.37%
Republican	Frederick C. Martindale	28,748	7.94%
Republican	James Hamilton	21,963	6.06%
Republican	Luren D. Dickinson	21,443	5.92%
Republican	Cassius L. Glasgow	16,113	4.45%
Republican	Horatio S. Earle	11,496	3.17%
Total votes		362,223	100.00%

=== Democratic party ===
Former governor Woodbridge N. Ferris was nominated without opposition.

==== Candidates ====
- Woodbridge N. Ferris, former governor

==== Results ====
Democratic primary results
Party	Candidate	Votes	%
Democratic	Woodbridge N. Ferris	22,379	100.00%
Total votes		22,379	100.00%

=== Minor parties ===
Socialist primary results
Party	Candidate	Votes	%
Socialist	Benjamin Blumenberg	1,142	100.00%
Total votes		1,142	100.00%

Prohibition primary results
Party	Candidate	Votes	%
Prohibition	John Y. Johnston	279	100.00%
Total votes		279	100.00%

Socialist Labor primary results
Party	Candidate	Votes	%
Socialist Labor	Edward R. Markley	167	100.00%
Total votes		167	100.00%

Farmer-Labor primary results
Party	Candidate	Votes	%
Farmer–Labor	Edward J. Jeffries	1,235	100.00%
Total votes		1,235	100.00%

== General election ==
=== Candidates ===
Major party candidates

- Alex J. Groesbeck, Republican
- Woodbridge N. Ferris, Democratic

Other candidates

- Benjamin Blumenberg, Socialist
- Edward J. Jeffries, Farmer-Labor
- John Y. Johnston, Prohibition
- Edward R. Markley, Socialist Labor

=== Results ===
1920 Michigan gubernatorial election
Party	Candidate	Votes	%	±%
Republican	Alex J. Groesbeck	703,180	66.43%	+5.02%
Democratic	Woodbridge N. Ferris	310,566	29.34%	−7.07%
Socialist	Benjamin Blumenberg	23,748 (Note: Includes 206 votes listed separately for "Benjamin J. Blumenberg". These votes were cast in Baraga, Gladwin, and Luce counties.)	2.24%	+0.62%
Farmer–Labor	Edward J. Jeffries	11,817	1.12%	
Prohibition	John Y. Johnston	6,990	0.66%	+0.28%
Socialist Labor	Edward R. Markley	2,097	0.20%	+0.02%
	Scattering	141	0.01%	
Majority		392,614	37.09%	
Total votes		1,058,539	100	
Republican hold		Swing	+12.09%	

==== Results by county ====
County	Alex J. Groesbeck Republican		Woodbridge N. Ferris Democratic		Benjamin Blumenberg Socialist		Edward J. Jeffries Farmer-Labor		John Y. Johnston Prohibition		Edward R. Markley Socialist Labor		Margin		Total votes cast
County	#	%	#	%	#	%	#	%	#	%	#	%	#	%	Total votes cast
Alcona	1,004	72.54%	318	22.98%	36	2.60%	12	0.87%	12	0.87%	2	0.14%	686	49.57%	1,384
Alger	1,212	62.03%	369	29.12%	137	7.01%	18	0.92%	8	0.41%	10	0.51%	643	32.91%	1,954
Allegan	6,904	66.43%	3,237	31.15%	97	0.93%	24	0.23%	121	1.16%	10	0.10%	3,667	35.28%	10,393
Alpena	3,351	61.08%	2,042	37.22%	82	1.49%	7	0.13%	3	0.05%	1	0.02%	1,309	23.86%	5,486
Antrim	2,054	70.37%	774	26.52%	42	1.44%	10	0.34%	38	1.30%	1	0.03%	1,280	43.85%	2,919
Arenac	1,373	59.51%	845	36.63%	56	2.43%	10	0.43%	20	0.87%	3	0.13%	528	22.89%	2,307
Baraga	1,289	69.56%	407	21.96%	117 (Note: Listed separately for "Benjamin J. Blumenberg")	6.31%	25	1.35%	6	0.32%	9	0.49%	882	47.60%	1,853
Barry	4,503	61.19%	2,691	36.57%	36	0.49%	10	0.14%	119	1.62%	0	0.00%	1,812	24.62%	7,359
Bay	13,009	61.21%	7,743	36.43%	188	0.88%	212	1.00%	42	0.20%	58	0.27%	5,266	24.78%	21,252
Benzie	1,321	61.93%	663	31.08%	84	3.94%	19	0.89%	44	2.06%	2	0.09%	658	30.85%	2,133
Berrien	14,584	67.87%	6,354	29.57%	327	1.52%	62	0.29%	120	0.56%	40	0.19%	8,230	38.30%	21,487
Branch	4,988	60.67%	3,032	36.88%	56	0.68%	17	0.21%	123	1.50%	4	0.05%	1,956	23.79%	8,221 (Note: Includes 1 Scattering vote)
Calhoun	14,373	59.12%	9,028	37.13%	424	1.74%	213	0.88%	214	0.88%	58	0.24%	5,345	21.99%	24,312 (Note: Includes 2 Scattering votes)
Cass	4,266	61.39%	2,464	35.46%	134	1.93%	19	0.27%	51	0.73%	14	0.20%	1,802	25.93%	6,949
Charlevoix	2,738	67.72%	1,101	27.23%	121	2.99%	13	0.32%	64	1.58%	6	0.15%	1,637	40.49%	4,043
Cheboygan	2,388	60.70%	1,440	36.60%	49	1.25%	29	0.74%	16	0.41%	12	0.31%	948	24.10%	3,934
Chippewa	4,632	71.99%	1,491	23.17%	157	2.44%	71	1.10%	67	1.04%	15	0.23%	3,141	48.82%	6,434
Clare	1,527	63.15%	793	32.80%	68	2.81%	3	0.12%	16	0.66%	11	0.45%	734	30.36%	2,418
Clinton	5,241	67.00%	2,469	31.56%	30	0.38%	14	0.18%	68	0.87%	0	0.00%	2,772	35.44%	7,822
Crawford	561	50.31%	525	47.09%	22	1.97%	1	0.09%	6	0.54%	0	0.00%	36	3.23%	1,115
Delta	5,083	65.74%	2,180	28.19%	302	3.91%	118	1.53%	23	0.30%	26	0.34%	2,903	37.55%	7,732
Dickinson	3,609	75.28%	725	15.12%	336	7.01%	25	0.52%	50	1.04%	49	1.02%	2,884	60.16%	4,794
Eaton	6,045	57.86%	4,094	39.18%	73	0.70%	23	0.22%	101	0.97%	4	0.04%	1,951	18.67%	10,448 (Note: Includes 108 Scattering votes)
Emmet	2,654	59.14%	1,586	35.34%	160	3.57%	14	0.31%	64	1.43%	10	0.22%	1,068	23.80%	4,488
Genesee	21,723	64.93%	10,988	32.84%	452	1.35%	80	0.24%	174	0.52%	40	0.12%	10,735	32.09%	33,457
Gladwin	1,591	73.25%	435	20.03%	81	3.73%	6	0.28%	54	2.49%	4	0.18%	1,156	53.22%	2,172
Gogebic	5,551	78.96%	963	13.70%	323	4.59%	61	0.87%	84	1.19%	48	0.68%	4,588	65.26%	7,030
Grand Traverse	3,513	62.17%	1,896	33.55%	151	2.67%	16	0.28%	70	1.24%	5	0.09%	1,617	28.61%	5,651
Gratiot	5,613	65.35%	2,827	32.91%	39	0.45%	12	0.14%	98	1.14%	0	0.00%	2,786	32.44%	8,589
Hillsdale	5,712	60.28%	3,570	37.67%	46	0.49%	11	0.12%	132	1.39%	4	0.04%	2,142	22.60%	9,476
Houghton	14,479	76.76%	3,855	20.44%	342	1.81%	81	0.43%	90	0.48%	15	0.08%	10,624	56.32%	18,862
Huron	7,703	74.51%	2,436	23.56%	97	0.94%	19	0.18%	77	0.74%	6	0.06%	5,267	50.95%	10,338
Ingham	15,224	56.46%	10,928	40.53%	436	1.62%	142	0.53%	207	0.77%	25	0.09%	4,296	15.93%	26,964
Ionia	6,421	54.05%	5,179	43.59%	80	0.67%	20	0.17%	176	1.48%	4	0.03%	1,242	10.45%	11,880
Iosco	1,855	69.37%	769	28.76%	28	1.05%	11	0.41%	9	0.34%	1	0.04%	1,086	40.61%	2,674
Iron	3,452	79.72%	679	15.68%	158	3.65%	11	0.25%	7	0.16%	23	0.53%	2,773	64.04%	4,330
Isabella	4,532	64.84%	2,299	32.89%	60	0.86%	6	0.09%	89	1.27%	3	0.04%	2,233	31.95%	6,990
Jackson	15,058	60.36%	9,250	37.08%	259	1.04%	105	0.42%	258	1.03%	18	0.07%	5,808	23.28%	24,948
Kalamazoo	12,784	61.53%	6,783	32.65%	474	2.28%	526	2.53%	158	0.76%	52	0.25%	6,001	28.88%	20,778
Kalkaska	812	66.23%	348	28.38%	25	2.04%	7	0.57%	33	2.69%	1	0.08%	464	37.85%	1,226
Kent	34,542	58.66%	22,214	37.73%	909	1.54%	628	1.07%	493	0.84%	97	0.16%	12,328	20.94%	58,883
Keweenaw	1,248	87.89%	121	8.52%	39	2.75%	4	0.28%	8	0.56%	0	0.00%	1,127	79.37%	1,420
Lake	870	67.49%	375	29.09%	30	2.33%	7	0.54%	6	0.47%	1	0.08%	495	38.40%	1,289
Lapeer	4,969	69.72%	2,002	28.09%	28	0.39%	11	0.15%	113	1.59%	4	0.06%	2,967	41.63%	7,127
Leelanau	1,919	71.85%	704	26.36%	35	1.31%	3	0.11%	8	0.30%	2	0.07%	1,215	45.49%	2,671
Lenawee	10,493	60.01%	6,764	38.68%	79	0.45%	11	0.06%	125	0.71%	6	0.03%	3,729	21.33%	17,486 (Note: Includes 8 Scattering votes)
Livingston	4,084	56.13%	3,050	41.92%	15	0.21%	9	0.12%	115	1.58%	3	0.04%	1,034	14.21%	7,276
Luce	635	66.77%	292	30.70%	8	0.84%	3	0.32%	13	1.37%	0	0.00%	343	36.07%	951
Mackinac	1,572	58.46%	1,065	39.61%	35	1.30%	5	0.19%	10	0.37%	2	0.07%	507	18.85%	2,689
Macomb	9,665	72.41%	3,393	25.42%	127	0.95%	63	0.47%	85	0.64%	15	0.11%	6,272	46.99%	13,348
Manistee	4,323	59.88%	2,755	38.16%	109	1.51%	11	0.15%	18	0.25%	4	0.06%	1,568	21.72%	7,220
Marquette	8,702	64.94%	3,975	29.66%	492	3.67%	144	1.07%	69	0.51%	19	0.14%	4,727	35.27%	13,401
Mason	3,328	62.43%	1,758	32.98%	148	2.78%	18	0.34%	69	1.29%	10	0.19%	1,570	29.45%	5,331
Mecosta	3,160	58.87%	2,075	38.65%	69	1.29%	6	0.11%	53	0.99%	2	0.04%	1,085	20.21%	5,368 (Note: Includes 3 Scattering votes)
Menominee	4,719	67.56%	2,013	28.82%	189	2.71%	29	0.42%	21	0.30%	14	0.20%	2,706	38.74%	6,985
Midland	3,659	68.75%	1,546	29.05%	68	1.28%	11	0.21%	35	0.66%	3	0.06%	2,113	39.70%	5,322
Missaukee	1,592	71.87%	593	26.77%	11	0.50%	3	0.14%	16	0.72%	0	0.00%	999	45.10%	2,215
Monroe	7,835	55.82%	6,023	42.91%	84	0.60%	14	0.10%	76	0.54%	5	0.04%	1,812	12.91%	14,037
Montcalm	5,990	69.03%	2,515	28.98%	85	0.98%	10	0.12%	68	0.78%	9	0.10%	3,475	40.05%	8,677
Montmorency	793	71.44%	255	22.97%	49	4.41%	4	0.36%	9	0.81%	0	0.00%	538	48.47%	1,110
Muskegon	10,889	67.41%	4,689	29.03%	399	2.47%	42	0.26%	104	0.64%	30	0.19%	6,200	38.38%	16,153
Newaygo	3,890	72.48%	1,309	24.39%	86	1.60%	8	0.15%	65	1.21%	9	0.17%	2,581	48.09%	5,367
Oakland	16,761	61.58%	9,354	34.36%	730	2.68%	123	0.45%	208	0.76%	41	0.15%	7,407	27.21%	27,220
Oceana	3,253	70.93%	1,150	25.08%	92	2.01%	14	0.31%	69	1.50%	8	0.17%	2,103	45.86%	4,586
Ogemaw	1,511	67.07%	657	29.16%	37	1.64%	3	0.13%	38	1.69%	7	0.31%	854	37.91%	2,253
Ontonagon	1,983	67.36%	696	23.64%	209	7.10%	29	0.99%	12	0.41%	15	0.51%	1,287	43.72%	2,944
Osceola	3,176	70.14%	1,275	28.16%	36	0.80%	10	0.22%	29	0.64%	2	0.04%	1,901	41.98%	4,528
Oscoda	417	76.80%	116	21.36%	3	0.55%	3	0.55%	3	0.55%	0	0.00%	301	55.43%	543
Otsego	747	53.78%	621	44.71%	3	0.22%	10	0.72%	8	0.58%	0	0.00%	126	9.07%	1,389
Ottawa	9,490	69.86%	3,762	27.69%	169	1.24%	31	0.23%	113	0.83%	20	0.15%	5,728	42.16%	13,585
Presque Isle	2,456	78.39%	618	19.73%	25	0.80%	16	0.51%	8	0.26%	10	0.32%	1,838	58.67%	3,133
Roscommon	615	68.87%	251	28.11%	22	2.46%	0	0.00%	2	0.22%	3	0.34%	364	40.76%	893
Saginaw	17,744	58.42%	11,701	38.52%	513	1.69%	259	0.85%	127	0.42%	30	0.10%	6,043	19.90%	30,374
Sanilac	6,786	77.32%	1,858	21.17%	44	0.50%	14	0.16%	70	0.80%	4	0.05%	4,928	56.15%	8,776
Schoolcraft	1,773	69.07%	531	20.69%	215	8.38%	20	0.78%	17	0.66%	11	0.43%	1,242	48.38%	2,567
Shiawassee	6,325	61.09%	3,617	34.93%	121	1.17%	28	0.27%	256	2.47%	5	0.05%	2,708	26.15%	10,354
St. Clair	14,057	70.33%	5,629	28.16%	129	0.65%	63	0.32%	83	0.42%	24	0.12%	8,428	42.17%	19,988
St. Joseph	5,654	61.74%	3,253	35.52%	102	1.11%	24	0.26%	104	1.14%	21	0.23%	2,401	26.22%	9,158
Tuscola	6,580	73.97%	2,089	23.49%	58	0.65%	27	0.30%	137	1.54%	4	0.04%	4,491	50.49%	8,895
Van Buren	6,469	69.75%	2,587	27.89%	133	1.43%	10	0.11%	69	0.74%	6	0.06%	3,882	41.85%	9,275
Washtenaw	12,087	64.05%	6,497	34.43%	110	0.58%	46	0.24%	106	0.56%	25	0.13%	5,590	29.62%	18,871
Wayne	218,803	72.08%	63,361	20.87%	11,666	3.84%	7,944	2.62%	771	0.25%	1,022	0.34%	155,442	51.21%	303,567
Wexford	2,884	61.21%	1,681	35.67%	52	1.10%	16	0.34%	69	1.46%	10	0.21%	1,203	25.53%	4,712
Total	703,180	66.43%	310,566	29.34%	23,748	2.24%	11,817	1.12%	6,990	0.66%	2.097	0.20%	392,614	37.09%	1,058,539
