= 1904 Michigan gubernatorial election =

- November 8, 1904
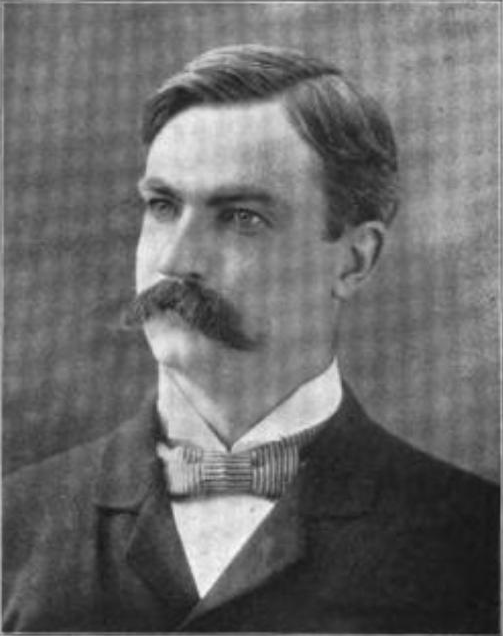

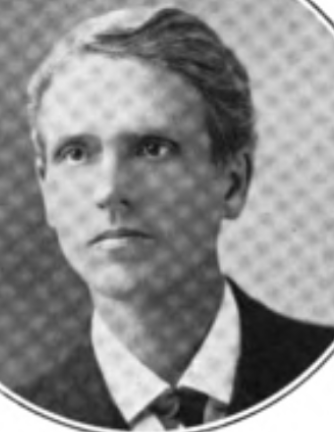
| Nominee | Fred M. Warner | Woodbridge N. Ferris |
| Party | Republican | Democratic |
| Popular vote | 283,799 | 223,571 |
| Percentage | 54.09% | 42.61% |
- County results Warner: 40–50% 50–60% 60–70% 70–80% 80–90% >90% Ferris: 40–50% 50–60%
Governor before election
Aaron T. Bliss
Republican
Elected Governor
Fred M. Warner
Republican

The 1904 Michigan gubernatorial election was held on November 8, 1904. Republican nominee Fred M. Warner defeated Democratic candidate Woodbridge N. Ferris with 54.09% of the vote.

== General election ==
=== Candidates ===
Major party candidates

- Fred M. Warner, Republican
- Woodbridge N. Ferris, Democratic

Other candidates

- Walter S. Westerman, Prohibition
- William E. Walter, Socialist
- Shepard B. Cowles, Socialist Labor

=== Results ===
1904 Michigan gubernatorial election
| Party | Candidate | Votes | % | ±% |
|---|---|---|---|---|
| Republican | Fred M. Warner | 283,799 | 54.09% | +1.56% |
| Democratic | Woodbridge N. Ferris | 223,571 | 42.61% | −0.67% |
| Prohibition | James M. Shackleton | 10,395 | 1.98% | −0.83% |
| Socialist | Clayton J. Lamb | 6,170 | 1.18% | +0.11% |
| Socialist Labor | Meiko Meyer | 782 | 0.15% | −0.17% |
| | Scattering | 4 | 0.00% | |
| Majority | | 60,228 | 11.48% | |
| Total votes | | 524,721 | 100.00% | |
| Republican hold | | Swing | +2.23% | |

==== Results by county ====
| County | Fred M. Warner Republican | | Woodbridge N. Ferris Democratic | | James M. Shackleton Prohibition | | Clayton J. Lamb Socialist | | Meiko Meyer Socialist Labor | | Margin | | Total votes cast |
| County | # | % | # | % | # | % | # | % | # | % | # | % | Total votes cast |
|---|---|---|---|---|---|---|---|---|---|---|---|---|---|
| Alcona | 802 | 77.41% | 200 | 19.31% | 17 | 1.64% | 16 | 1.54% | 1 | 0.10% | 602 | 58.11% | 1,036 |
| Alger | 899 | 67.44% | 407 | 30.53% | 9 | 0.68% | 15 | 1.13% | 3 | 0.23% | 492 | 36.91% | 1,333 |
| Allegan | 4,810 | 63.31% | 2,505 | 32.97% | 223 | 2.93% | 56 | 0.74% | 4 | 0.05% | 2,305 | 30.34% | 7,598 |
| Alpena | 2,151 | 59.68% | 1,303 | 36.15% | 27 | 0.75% | 115 | 3.19% | 8 | 0.22% | 848 | 23.53% | 3,604 |
| Antrim | 1,883 | 59.70% | 1,191 | 37.76% | 75 | 2.38% | 5 | 0.16% | 0 | 0.00% | 692 | 21.94% | 3,154 |
| Arenac | 1,100 | 55.25% | 753 | 37.82% | 77 | 3.87% | 60 | 3.01% | 1 | 0.05% | 347 | 17.43% | 1,991 |
| Baraga | 523 | 68.01% | 233 | 30.30% | 9 | 1.17% | 2 | 0.26% | 2 | 0.26% | 290 | 37.71% | 769 |
| Barry | 2,962 | 50.53% | 2,669 | 45.53% | 208 | 3.55% | 18 | 0.31% | 5 | 0.09% | 293 | 5.00% | 5,862 |
| Bay | 5,777 | 52.35% | 4,939 | 44.75% | 220 | 1.99% | 63 | 0.57% | 37 | 0.34% | 838 | 7.59% | 11,036 |
| Benzie | 1,235 | 57.34% | 707 | 32.82% | 190 | 8.82% | 18 | 0.84% | 3 | 0.14% | 528 | 24.51% | 2,154 (Note: Includes 1 Scattering vote) |
| Berrien | 6,427 | 55.12% | 4,881 | 41.86% | 177 | 1.52% | 155 | 1.33% | 19 | 0.16% | 1,546 | 13.26% | 11,659 |
| Branch | 3,560 | 56.39% | 2,640 | 41.82% | 95 | 1.50% | 15 | 0.24% | 3 | 0.05% | 920 | 14.57% | 6,313 |
| Calhoun | 5,991 | 51.27% | 4,904 | 41.97% | 223 | 1.91% | 521 | 4.46% | 46 | 0.39% | 1,087 | 9.30% | 11,685 |
| Cass | 2,874 | 52.48% | 2,334 | 42.62% | 161 | 2.94% | 103 | 1.88% | 4 | 0.07% | 540 | 9.86% | 5,476 |
| Charlevoix | 2,126 | 62.00% | 1,197 | 34.91% | 70 | 2.04% | 32 | 0.93% | 4 | 0.12% | 929 | 27.09% | 3,429 |
| Cheboygan | 2,101 | 57.56% | 1,469 | 40.25% | 41 | 1.12% | 33 | 0.90% | 6 | 0.16% | 632 | 17.32% | 3,650 |
| Chippewa | 2,551 | 67.88% | 1,088 | 28.95% | 91 | 2.42% | 26 | 0.69% | 2 | 0.05% | 1,463 | 38.93% | 3,758 |
| Clare | 1,199 | 58.23% | 820 | 39.83% | 24 | 1.17% | 15 | 0.73% | 1 | 0.05% | 379 | 18.41% | 2,059 |
| Clinton | 3,227 | 50.81% | 3,021 | 47.57% | 90 | 1.42% | 11 | 0.17% | 2 | 0.03% | 206 | 3.24% | 6,351 |
| Crawford | 465 | 58.20% | 317 | 39.67% | 10 | 1.25% | 7 | 0.88% | 0 | 0.00% | 148 | 18.52% | 799 |
| Delta | 3,007 | 71.87% | 1,034 | 24.71% | 42 | 1.00% | 80 | 1.91% | 21 | 0.50% | 1,973 | 47.16% | 4,184 |
| Dickinson | 2,839 | 84.09% | 417 | 12.35% | 74 | 2.19% | 39 | 1.16% | 7 | 0.21% | 2,422 | 71.74% | 3,376 |
| Eaton | 4,168 | 51.76% | 3,705 | 46.01% | 139 | 1.73% | 38 | 0.47% | 2 | 0.02% | 463 | 5.75% | 8,052 |
| Emmet | 2,254 | 57.43% | 1,453 | 37.02% | 211 | 5.38% | 5 | 0.13% | 2 | 0.05% | 801 | 20.41% | 3,925 |
| Genesee | 4,946 | 50.81% | 4,246 | 43.62% | 308 | 3.16% | 217 | 2.23% | 18 | 0.18% | 700 | 7.19% | 9,735 |
| Gladwin | 985 | 71.22% | 360 | 26.03% | 26 | 1.88% | 10 | 0.72% | 2 | 0.14% | 625 | 45.19% | 1,383 |
| Gogebic | 1,992 | 73.48% | 541 | 19.96% | 117 | 4.32% | 40 | 1.48% | 21 | 0.77% | 1,451 | 53.52% | 2,711 |
| Grand Traverse | 2,607 | 62.28% | 1,449 | 34.59% | 119 | 2.84% | 7 | 0.17% | 5 | 0.12% | 1,159 | 27.69% | 4,186 |
| Gratiot | 3,524 | 52.46% | 2,991 | 44.52% | 180 | 2.68% | 20 | 0.30% | 3 | 0.04% | 533 | 7.93% | 6,718 |
| Hillsdale | 3,817 | 53.80% | 2,983 | 42.04% | 264 | 3.72% | 25 | 0.35% | 6 | 0.08% | 834 | 11.75% | 7,095 |
| Houghton | 8,197 | 72.48% | 2,180 | 19.28% | 382 | 3.38% | 512 | 4.53% | 38 | 0.34% | 6,017 | 53.21% | 11,309 |
| Huron | 3,346 | 56.28% | 2,457 | 41.33% | 112 | 1.88% | 30 | 0.50% | 0 | 0.00% | 889 | 14.95% | 5,945 |
| Ingham | 5,259 | 46.61% | 5,643 | 50.01% | 292 | 2.59% | 76 | 0.67% | 13 | 0.12% | -384 | -3.40% | 11,283 |
| Ionia | 4,046 | 47.16% | 4,293 | 50.03% | 181 | 2.11% | 56 | 0.65% | 4 | 0.05% | -247 | -2.88% | 8,580 |
| Iosco | 1,200 | 60.70% | 749 | 37.89% | 19 | 0.96% | 8 | 0.40% | 0 | 0.00% | 451 | 22.81% | 1,977 |
| Iron | 1,520 | 84.12% | 244 | 13.50% | 18 | 1.00% | 15 | 0.83% | 10 | 0.55% | 1,276 | 70.61% | 1,807 |
| Isabella | 2,756 | 54.93% | 2,190 | 43.65% | 61 | 1.22% | 9 | 0.18% | 0 | 0.00% | 566 | 11.28% | 5,017 |
| Jackson | 6,038 | 48.77% | 6,053 | 48.89% | 168 | 1.36% | 105 | 0.85% | 17 | 0.14% | -15 | -0.12% | 12,381 |
| Kalamazoo | 6,328 | 55.05% | 4,312 | 37.52% | 431 | 3.75% | 372 | 3.24% | 51 | 0.44% | 2,016 | 17.54% | 11,494 |
| Kalkaska | 1,034 | 64.18% | 527 | 32.71% | 48 | 2.98% | 2 | 0.12% | 0 | 0.00% | 507 | 31.47% | 1,611 |
| Kent | 12,854 | 45.08% | 14,695 | 51.54% | 429 | 1.50% | 501 | 1.76% | 32 | 0.11% | -1,841 | -6.46% | 28,511 |
| Keweenaw | 641 | 92.23% | 46 | 6.62% | 4 | 0.58% | 2 | 0.29% | 2 | 0.29% | 595 | 85.61% | 695 |
| Lake | 689 | 60.07% | 445 | 38.80% | 7 | 0.61% | 6 | 0.52% | 0 | 0.00% | 244 | 21.27% | 1,147 |
| Lapeer | 3,110 | 54.35% | 2,440 | 42.64% | 133 | 2.32% | 38 | 0.66% | 1 | 0.02% | 670 | 11.71% | 5,722 |
| Leelanau | 1,228 | 62.75% | 682 | 34.85% | 41 | 2.10% | 4 | 0.20% | 2 | 0.10% | 546 | 27.90% | 1,957 |
| Lenawee | 5,953 | 50.67% | 5,461 | 46.48% | 302 | 2.57% | 29 | 0.25% | 3 | 0.03% | 492 | 4.19% | 11,748 |
| Livingston | 2,239 | 41.89% | 2,989 | 55.92% | 113 | 2.11% | 3 | 0.06% | 1 | 0.02% | -750 | -14.03% | 5,345 |
| Luce | 288 | 63.02% | 151 | 33.04% | 14 | 3.06% | 2 | 0.44% | 2 | 0.44% | 137 | 29.98% | 457 |
| Mackinac | 1,035 | 60.00% | 666 | 38.61% | 20 | 1.16% | 3 | 0.17% | 1 | 0.06% | 369 | 21.39% | 1,725 |
| Macomb | 4,032 | 50.28% | 3,850 | 48.01% | 118 | 1.47% | 13 | 0.16% | 5 | 0.06% | 182 | 2.27% | 8,019 |
| Manistee | 2,406 | 51.28% | 2,098 | 44.71% | 86 | 1.83% | 88 | 1.88% | 14 | 0.30% | 308 | 6.56% | 4,692 |
| Marquette | 4,988 | 70.80% | 1,732 | 24.58% | 227 | 3.22% | 88 | 1.25% | 10 | 0.14% | 3,256 | 46.22% | 7,045 |
| Mason | 1,668 | 49.85% | 1,576 | 47.10% | 82 | 2.45% | 18 | 0.54% | 2 | 0.06% | 92 | 2.75% | 3,346 |
| Mecosta | 2,361 | 53.85% | 1,932 | 44.07% | 86 | 1.96% | 4 | 0.09% | 1 | 0.02% | 429 | 9.79% | 4,384 |
| Menominee | 2,827 | 63.80% | 1,460 | 32.95% | 66 | 1.49% | 70 | 1.58% | 8 | 0.18% | 1,367 | 30.85% | 4,431 |
| Midland | 1,708 | 56.71% | 1,231 | 40.87% | 58 | 1.93% | 15 | 0.50% | 0 | 0.00% | 477 | 15.84% | 3,012 |
| Missaukee | 1,484 | 66.91% | 689 | 31.06% | 30 | 1.35% | 15 | 0.68% | 0 | 0.00% | 795 | 35.84% | 2,218 |
| Monroe | 3,783 | 48.84% | 3,796 | 49.01% | 152 | 1.96% | 13 | 0.17% | 2 | 0.03% | -13 | -0.17% | 7,746 |
| Montcalm | 3,998 | 57.48% | 2,805 | 40.33% | 114 | 1.64% | 29 | 0.42% | 9 | 0.13% | 1,193 | 17.15% | 6,955 |
| Montmorency | 587 | 71.50% | 225 | 27.41% | 8 | 0.97% | 0 | 0.00% | 1 | 0.12% | 362 | 44.09% | 821 |
| Muskegon | 4,369 | 60.76% | 2,442 | 33.96% | 80 | 1.11% | 287 | 3.99% | 12 | 0.17% | 1,927 | 26.80% | 7,190 |
| Newaygo | 2,345 | 59.87% | 1,470 | 37.53% | 91 | 2.32% | 7 | 0.18% | 4 | 0.10% | 875 | 22.34% | 3,917 |
| Oakland | 5,656 | 49.85% | 5,479 | 48.29% | 175 | 1.54% | 33 | 0.29% | 3 | 0.03% | 177 | 1.56% | 11,346 |
| Oceana | 2,193 | 62.18% | 1,156 | 32.78% | 146 | 4.14% | 31 | 0.88% | 1 | 0.03% | 1,037 | 29.40% | 3,527 |
| Ogemaw | 1,158 | 66.32% | 506 | 28.98% | 73 | 4.18% | 7 | 0.40% | 2 | 0.11% | 652 | 37.34% | 1,746 |
| Ontonagon | 1,289 | 73.87% | 418 | 23.95% | 15 | 0.86% | 21 | 1.20% | 2 | 0.11% | 871 | 49.91% | 1,745 |
| Osceola | 2,208 | 60.03% | 1,365 | 37.11% | 91 | 2.47% | 10 | 0.27% | 4 | 0.11% | 843 | 22.92% | 3,678 |
| Oscoda | 307 | 81.87% | 61 | 16.27% | 7 | 1.87% | 0 | 0.00% | 0 | 0.00% | 246 | 65.60% | 375 |
| Otsego | 1,060 | 67.34% | 472 | 29.99% | 29 | 1.84% | 9 | 0.57% | 4 | 0.25% | 588 | 37.36% | 1,574 |
| Ottawa | 4,853 | 61.78% | 2,767 | 35.23% | 123 | 1.57% | 95 | 1.21% | 17 | 0.22% | 2,086 | 26.56% | 7,855 |
| Presque Isle | 1,634 | 72.78% | 596 | 26.55% | 11 | 0.49% | 2 | 0.09% | 2 | 0.09% | 1,038 | 46.24% | 2,245 |
| Roscommon | 318 | 60.57% | 181 | 34.48% | 9 | 1.71% | 17 | 3.24% | 0 | 0.00% | 137 | 26.10% | 525 |
| Saginaw | 8,481 | 50.61% | 7,176 | 42.82% | 172 | 1.03% | 861 | 5.14% | 67 | 0.40% | 1,305 | 7.79% | 16,757 |
| Sanilac | 3,632 | 57.67% | 2,377 | 37.74% | 268 | 4.26% | 17 | 0.27% | 4 | 0.06% | 1,255 | 19.93% | 6,298 |
| Schoolcraft | 1,325 | 74.94% | 388 | 21.95% | 37 | 2.09% | 16 | 0.90% | 2 | 0.11% | 937 | 53.00% | 1,768 |
| Shiawassee | 4,272 | 50.91% | 3,720 | 44.33% | 338 | 4.03% | 54 | 0.64% | 7 | 0.08% | 552 | 6.58% | 8,391 |
| St. Clair | 6,638 | 54.88% | 5,119 | 42.32% | 186 | 1.54% | 141 | 1.17% | 12 | 0.10% | 1,519 | 12.56% | 12,096 |
| St. Joseph | 3,113 | 51.00% | 2,837 | 46.48% | 90 | 1.47% | 57 | 0.93% | 7 | 0.11% | 276 | 4.52% | 6,104 |
| Tuscola | 4,100 | 59.14% | 2,517 | 36.30% | 284 | 4.10% | 29 | 0.42% | 3 | 0.04% | 1,583 | 22.83% | 6,933 |
| Van Buren | 4,707 | 64.96% | 2,293 | 31.65% | 188 | 2.59% | 53 | 0.73% | 5 | 0.07% | 2,414 | 33.31% | 7,246 |
| Washtenaw | 4,892 | 46.02% | 5,571 | 52.41% | 132 | 1.24% | 24 | 0.23% | 11 | 0.10% | -679 | -6.39% | 10,630 |
| Wayne | 32,561 | 45.04% | 38,732 | 53.57% | 358 | 0.50% | 500 | 0.69% | 144 | 0.20% | -6,171 | -8.54% | 72,295 |
| Wexford | 2,283 | 56.81% | 1,555 | 38.69% | 173 | 4.30% | 6 | 0.15% | 2 | 0.05% | 728 | 18.11% | 4,019 |
| Total | 283,799 | 54.09% | 223,571 | 42.61% | 10,395 | 1.98% | 6,170 | 1.18% | 782 | 0.15% | 60,228 | 11.48% | 524,721 |

===== Counties that flipped from Democratic to Republican =====
- Bay
- Calhoun
- Kalamazoo
- Saginaw
- St. Joseph

===== Counties that flipped from Republican to Democratic =====
- Ionia
- Kent
- Monroe
