= Woodbridge N. Ferris =

American politician and educator (1853–1928)

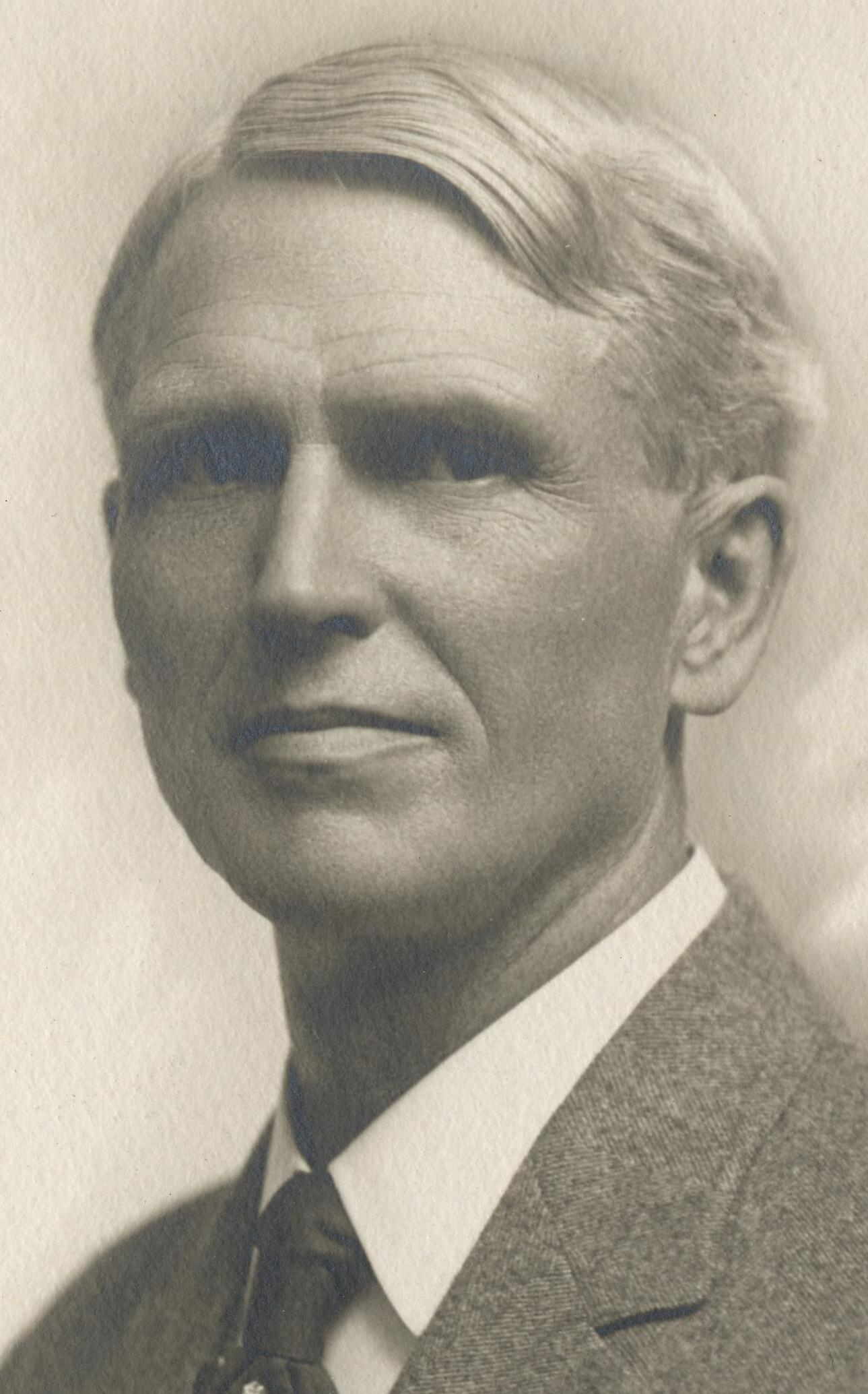
- Ferris in 1907

28th Governor of Michigan
- In office January 1, 1913 – January 1, 1917
- Lieutenant: John Q. Ross; Luren D. Dickinson
- Preceded by: Chase Osborn
- Succeeded by: Albert Sleeper

United States Senator from Michigan
- In office March 4, 1923 – March 23, 1928
- Preceded by: Charles E. Townsend
- Succeeded by: Arthur H. Vandenberg

Personal details
- Born: Woodbridge Nathan Ferris; January 6, 1853 Spencer, New York, US
- Died: March 23, 1928 (aged 75) Washington, D.C., US
- Resting place: Highlandview Cemetery, Big Rapids, Michigan, US
- Party: Democratic
- Spouses: Helen Frances Gillespie (m. 1874; died 1917) Mary Ethel McLoud (m. 1921)
- Children: 3
- Education: Oswego Normal Training School; University of Michigan Medical School
- Occupation: Educator

Woodbridge Nathan Ferris (January 6, 1853 – March 23, 1928) was an American educator from New York, Illinois and Michigan who served as the 28th governor of Michigan and in the United States Senate as a Democrat. He was the founder and namesake of Ferris State University.

== Early life ==
Woodbridge N. Ferris was born in a log cabin near Spencer, New York, on January 6, 1853, the first of seven children born to John Ferris Jr. and Estella (Reed) Ferris. He was raised and educated in Spencer, and at age 14 enrolled in Spencer Academy. At age 16, he attended a teacher's institute in Waverly and received his teaching credentials. After a year of teaching, he decided to further his education at the academy in Owego.

From 1870 to 1873, Woodbridge attended the Oswego Normal Training School (now State University of New York at Oswego). At Oswego, Woodbridge's professors included Hermann Krusi, an instructor of drawing and geometry; Krusi's father had been chief assistant to Johann Heinrich Pestalozzi at Pestalozzi's school in Switzerland. Krusi taught Woodbridge the Pestalozzi method of learning by hands on application rather than theoretical lectures, a concept Woodbridge continued to employ throughout his career as an educator.

== Start of career ==
After graduating from the Oswego normal school, Woodbridge returned to Spencer, where he became principal of the village's academy. After a year as principal, Ferris attended the University of Michigan Medical School from 1873 to 1874. In December 1874, he married Helen Frances Gillespie, whom he met at Oswego, and who taught at the academy in Spencer while he was principal. The couple had three sons: Carleton Gillespie (1876–1961), Clifford Wendell (1881, died at three months), and Phelps Fitch (1889–1935). Ferris taught again at Spencer Academy from 1874 to 1875.

In 1875, Ferris moved to Freeport, Illinois to become principal of the Freeport Business College and Academy. In 1876, he became principal of the Normal Department of Rock River University. In 1877, he co-founded the Dixon Business College and Academy of Dixon, Illinois. In 1879, Ferris became superintendent of schools in Pittsfield, Illinois, where he remained until 1884.

== Continued career ==
In 1884, Ferris settled in Big Rapids, Michigan, where he established the Ferris Industrial School (now Ferris State University). Ferris served as president of the school until his death, and became so identified with it that he was nicknamed "The Big Rapids Schoolmaster". He was also president of the Big Rapids Savings Bank.

During the Panic of 1893, Ferris experienced financial setbacks and his school was on the verge of closing, but several former students loaned him the money to continue. The institution was subsequently incorporated, and Ferris was able to capitalize it at $50,000 (almost $2 million in 2024). The Ferris school was a success, and its reputation became known nationwide. Over time, it expanded to include several well-regarded departments, among them English, business, pharmacy, civil service, elocution, music, and college preparatory.

In 1892, Ferris was an unsuccessful Democratic candidate for the U.S. House from Michigan's 11th district. In 1904, he was an unsuccessful candidate for Governor of Michigan against Republican Fred M. Warner. He was a delegate to the 1908 Democratic National Convention, and he was again a delegate to the 1912 convention.

== Governor of Michigan ==
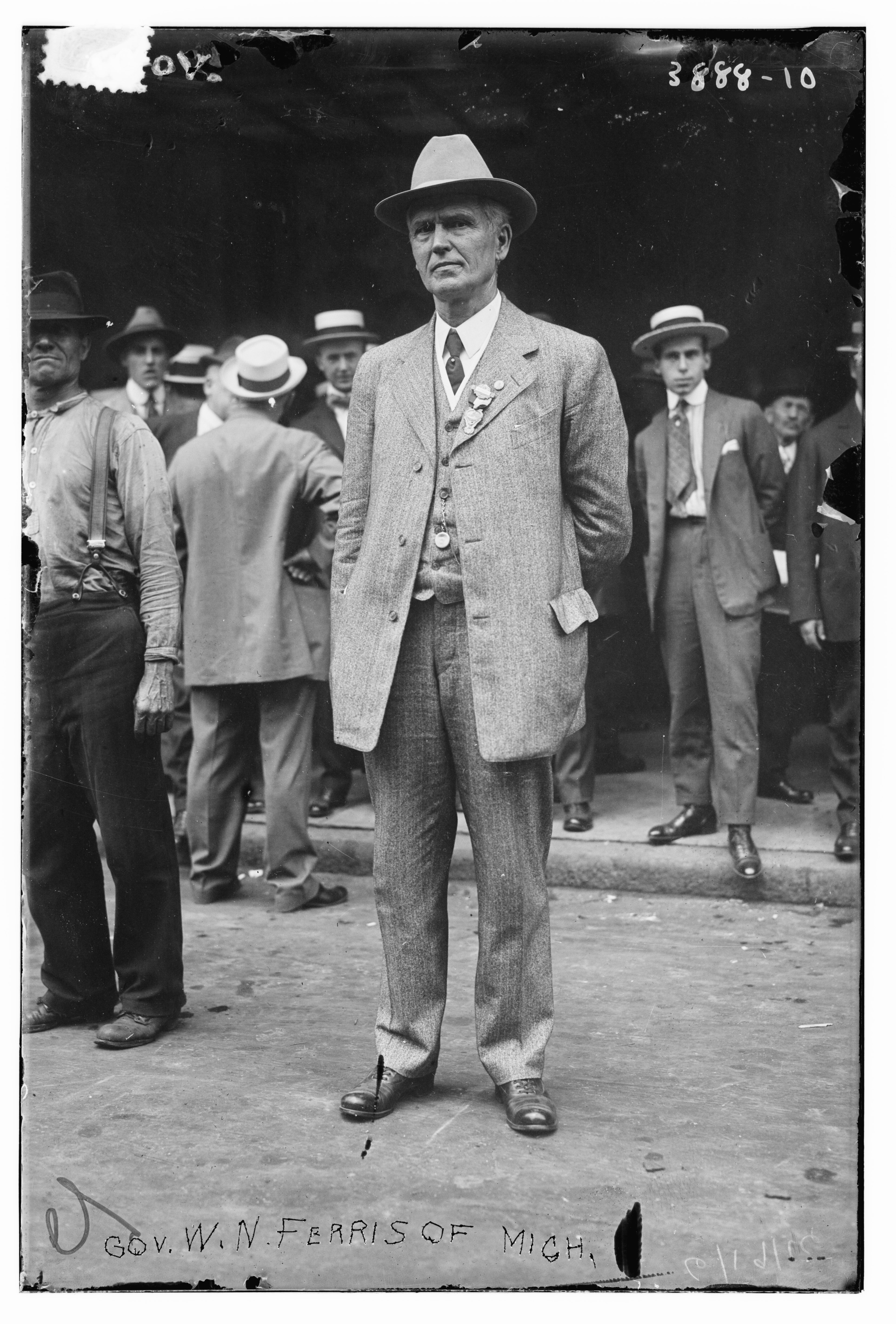
Governor Ferris in 1916

Ferris was elected governor of Michigan in 1912, becoming the first Democratic governor in 20 years, and he served from 1913 to 1917. During his tenure, several reforms were introduced, including a farm colony for epileptics and the Central Michigan Tuberculosis Sanatorium. In addition, the bitter Copper Country Strike of 1913–1914 occurred during Ferris's tenure. After a sustained period of violence between striking miners and a combination of strikebreakers and supporters of the mine owners, Ferris deployed the National Guard, which stayed in the area for more than a year, an action that provoked confrontations between strikers and troops. The violence between strikers and strikebreakers, and strikers and the National Guard revealed the need for a sustained law enforcement presence in northern Michigan, which led to the post-strike creation of the Michigan State Police.

In 1914, Ferris was named honorary president of the First National Conference on Race Betterment, a meeting about eugenics held at the Battle Creek Sanatorium; because of the mine strike was still ongoing, he did not attend the conference. In 1916, he was again a delegate to the Democratic National Convention. Ferris's successful governorship and his easy to recognize appearance—tall, with a full head of silver-gray hair—led to the nickname the "Good Gray Governor".

== U.S. Senator ==
Helen Ferris died on March 23, 1917. In 1920, Ferris was an unsuccessful candidate for governor, being defeated by Alex Groesbeck. On August 14, 1921, he married Mary E. McCloud (1882–1954). Ferris was the recipient of several honorary degrees, including a master of pedagogy from Michigan State Normal College, and LL.D.s from Olivet College, the University of Michigan, and the University of Notre Dame.

In 1922, Ferris was elected to the United States Senate for the term beginning on March 4, 1923. Appointed to the Committee On Education and Labor, Ferris supported the establishment of a federal Department of Education. In 1924, Ferris was again a delegate to the Democratic National Convention; he was Michigan's favorite son candidate for president, and received 30 votes on the first ballot. The nomination went to John W. Davis, who lost the general election to Calvin Coolidge.

== Death ==
In early March 1928, Ferris announced that he would not be a candidate for reelection to the senate. He died in Washington, D.C., on March 23, 1928. Ferris was interred at Highlandview Cemetery in Big Rapids, as were his first wife and his sons Carleton and Phelps.

== Legacy ==
The World War II Liberty Ship SS Woodbridge N. Ferris was named in his honor.

== See also ==
- List of members of the United States Congress who died in office (1900–1949)

Party political offices
Preceded by Lorenzo T. Durand	Democratic nominee for Governor of Michigan; 1904	Succeeded by Charles H. Kimmerle
Preceded by Lawton T. Hemans	Democratic nominee for Governor of Michigan; 1912, 1914	Succeeded by Edwin F. Sweet
Preceded by John W. Bailey	Democratic nominee for Governor of Michigan; 1920	Succeeded by Alva M. Cummins
Preceded by Lawrence Price	Democratic nominee for U.S. Senator from Michigan (Class 1); 1922	Succeeded by John W. Bailey
Political offices
Preceded by Chase Osborn	Governor of Michigan; 1913–1917	Succeeded by Albert Sleeper
U.S. Senate
Preceded by Charles E. Townsend	U.S. Senator (Class 1) from Michigan; 1923–1928	Succeeded by Arthur H. Vandenberg
