= Jackson Citizen Patriot =

Daily newspaper in Michigan, US

- Type: Daily newspaper
- Owner(s): MLive Media Group (Advance Publications)
- Publisher: Tim Gruber
- Editor: Leanne Smith
- Circulation: 4,917 Daily; 9,529 Sunday (as of 2022)
- Website: mlive.com/jackson

Jackson Citizen Patriot is a daily newspaper published in Jackson, Michigan.

Since 2012, the Citizen Patriot has been published at AnnArbor.com printing facility in Ann Arbor. Also in 2012, home delivery of the newspaper was cut back to Tuesdays, Thursdays and Sundays, although the print edition is still published daily.

== Citizen of the Year Awards ==
Every year the Patriot seeks to recognize true community heroes who donate their time or money or other resources to improve the quality of life in Jackson County through its Citizen Patriot Citizen of the Year program.
