= Fred M. Warner =

American politician (1865–1923)

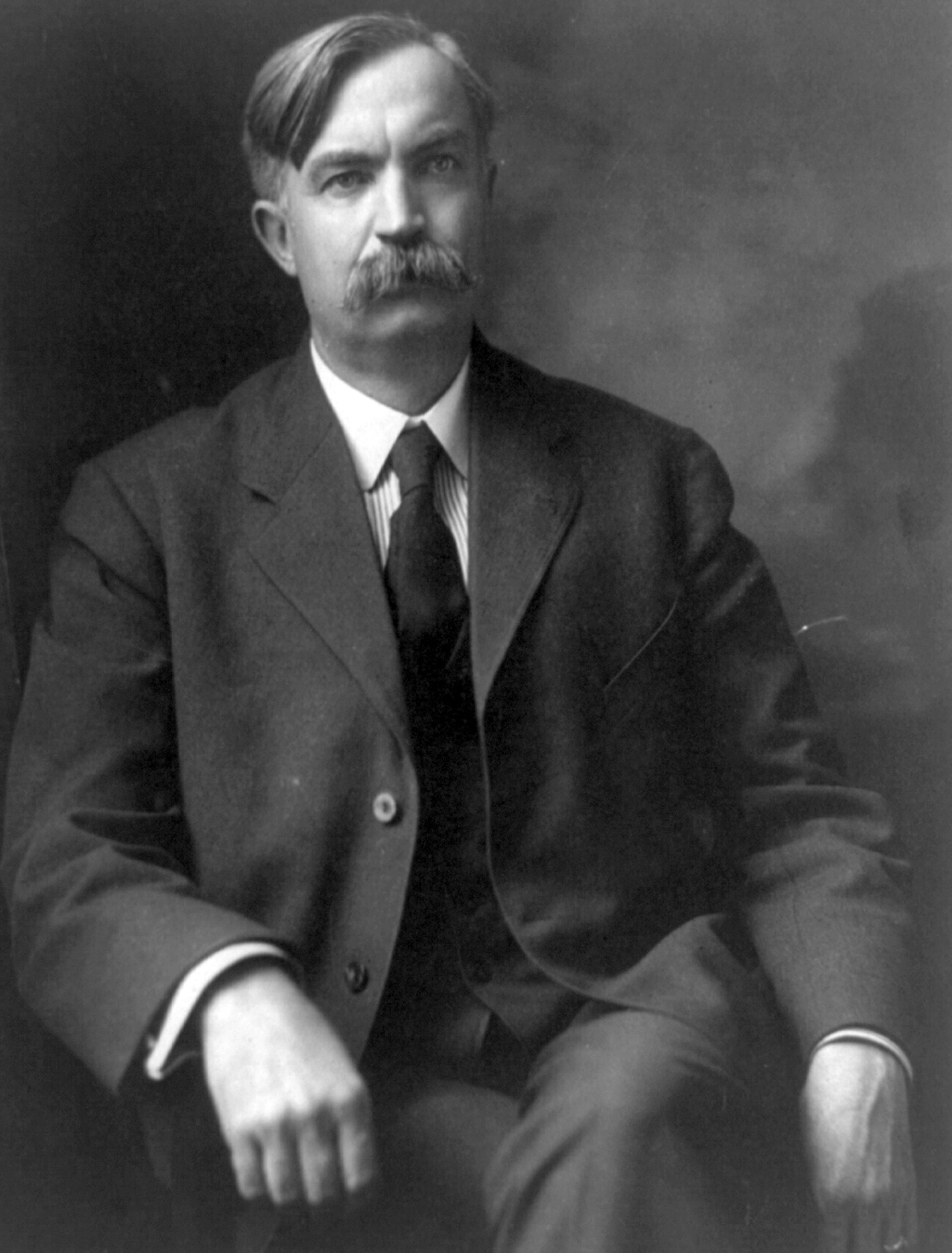

26th Governor of Michigan
- In office January 1, 1905 – January 2, 1911
- Lieutenant: Alexander Maitland; Patrick H. Kelley
- Preceded by: Aaron T. Bliss
- Succeeded by: Chase Osborn

24th Secretary of State of Michigan
- In office 1901–1905
- Governor: Aaron T. Bliss
- Preceded by: Justus S. Stearns
- Succeeded by: George A. Prescott

Member of the Michigan Senate from the 12th district
- In office January 2, 1895–1898
- Preceded by: Harvey Mellen
- Succeeded by: George Burlingham Davis

Personal details
- Born: Fred Maltby Warner; July 21, 1865 Hickling, Nottinghamshire, England
- Died: April 17, 1923 (aged 57) Orlando, Florida, U.S.
- Party: Republican

Fred Maltby Warner (July 21, 1865 – April 17, 1923) was an American politician who served as the 26th governor of Michigan from 1905 to 1911. He also served as the 24th secretary of state of Michigan from 1901 to 1905.

== Birth in England and early life in Michigan ==
Born in Hickling, Nottinghamshire, England, Warner spent most of his life in Michigan. Warner was orphaned at three months of age and adopted by a family in Farmington. His adoptive father, P. Dean Warner, served in both chambers of the state legislature during periods from 1852 to 1870.

He attended the common schools there and later attended the Michigan Agricultural College (now Michigan State University). He worked at his father's store and later, as a Farmington businessman and agriculturist, he established thirteen cheese factories.

== Politics ==
As a prominent citizen he rose quickly in politics in 1894. From 1895 to 1898 he served in the Michigan Senate just as his father did. From 1901 until 1904 he served as the Michigan Secretary of State under Aaron T. Bliss.

In 1904, Warner was elected Governor of Michigan and served three terms, 1905–1911. He was known as a progressive governor advocating such policies as regulation of railroad and insurance, conservation, child labor laws and woman's suffrage. Also during his six years in office, a factory inspection bill was authorized, a direct primary election law was sanctioned and there was a promotion of highway construction.

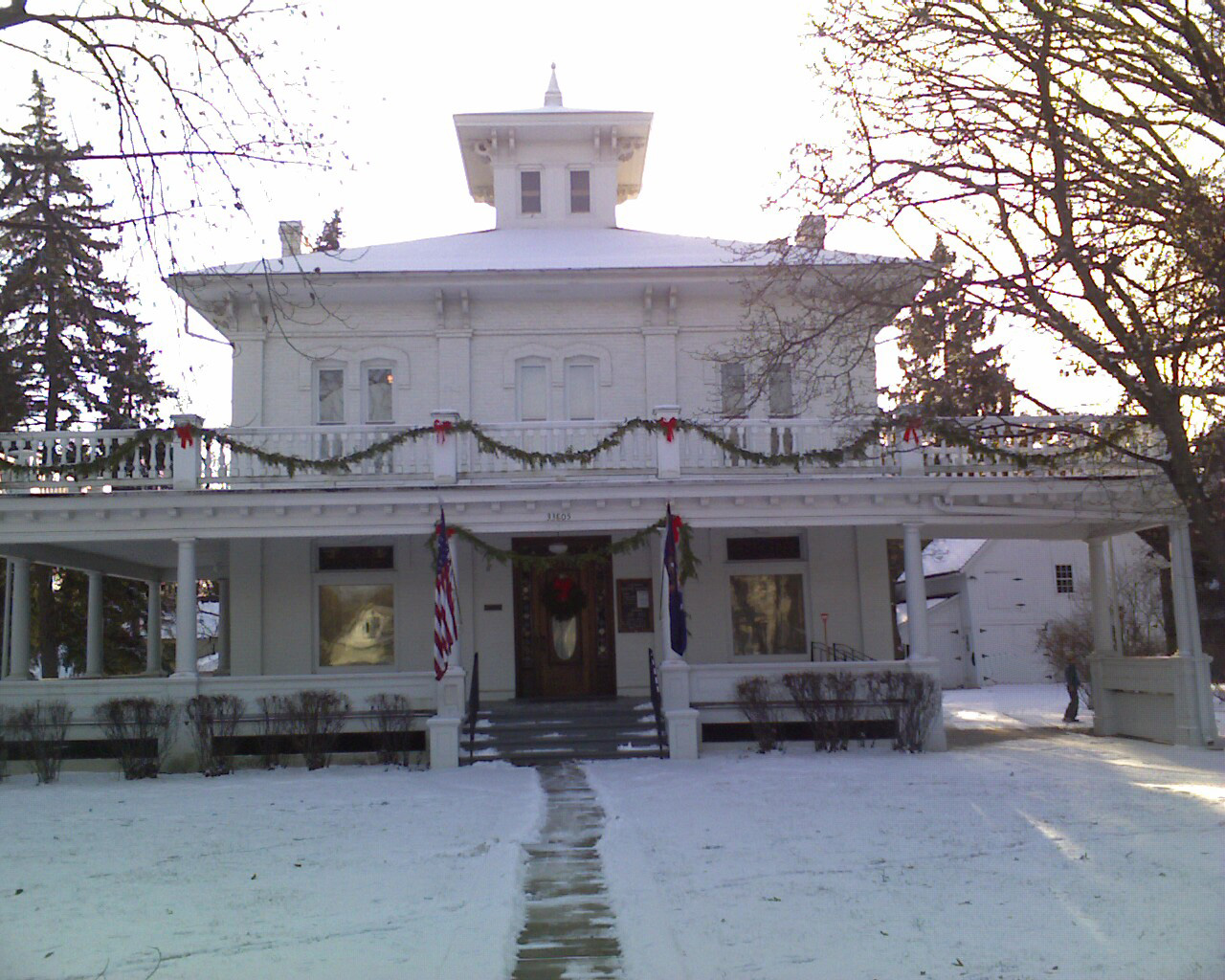
Warner Mansion in Farmington, Michigan was the Governor's residence and is now a historical site

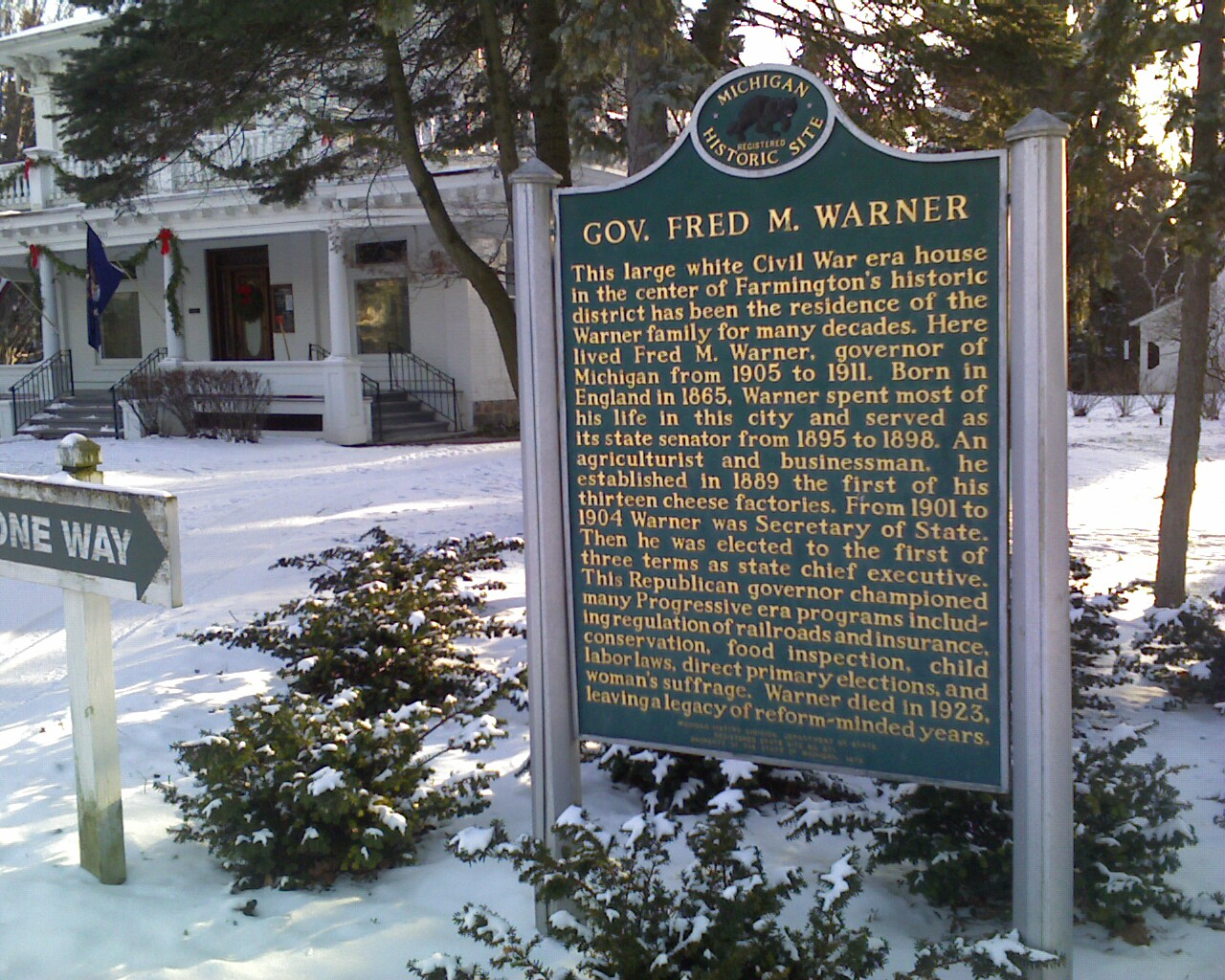

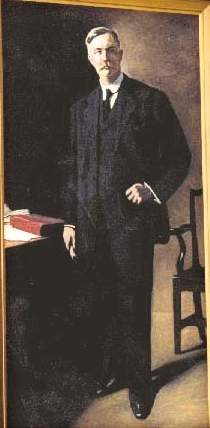
Portrait of Warner

== Retirement and death ==
After leaving office, he stayed politically active. Warner was a member of the Freemasons, Shriners, Elks, Knights of Pythias, and Maccabees. In 1920, he began serving as a Republican National Committeeman until his death three years later. He died at the age of 57 from kidney failure and is interred at Oakwood Cemetery in Farmington, Michigan.

== See also ==
- List of United States governors born outside the United States

== Sources ==
- The Political Graveyard
- National Governors Association
- Gov. Warner Mansion via web.archive.org. Accessed March 29, 2024.

Party political offices
Preceded by Aaron T. Bliss	Republican nominee for Governor of Michigan; 1904, 1906, 1908	Succeeded by Chase Osborn
Political offices
Preceded by Justus S. Stearns	Michigan Secretary of State; 1901 – 1904	Succeeded by George A. Prescott
Preceded by Aaron T. Bliss	Governor of Michigan; 1905–1911	Succeeded by Chase Osborn
