= Frederick C. Martindale =

American politician (1865–1928)

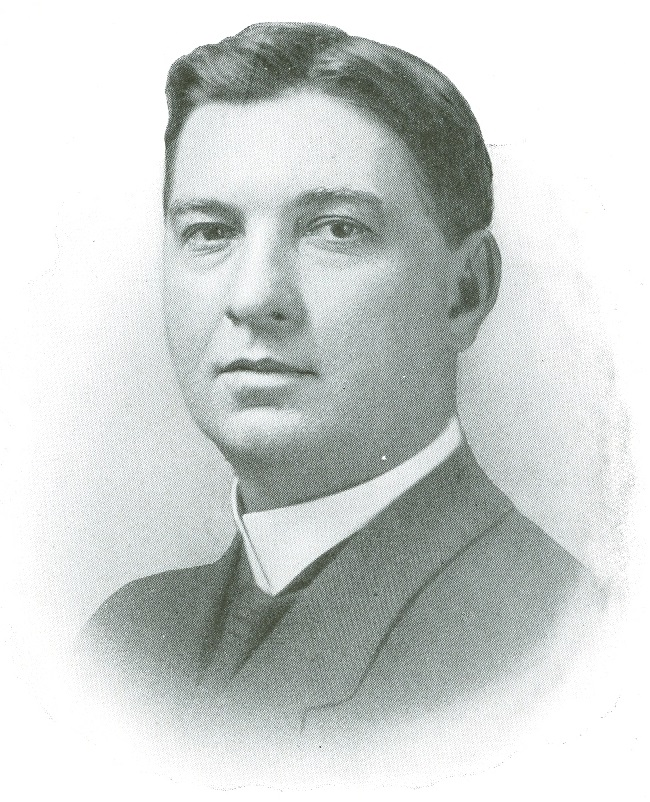

Michigan Secretary of State
- In office 1909–1914
- Governor: Fred M. Warner; Chase Osborn
- Preceded by: George A. Prescott
- Succeeded by: Coleman C. Vaughan

Member of the Michigan Senate from the 1st district
- In office January 1, 1905 – 1908
- Preceded by: William P. Scullen
- Succeeded by: Lawrence W. Snell

Member of the Michigan House of Representatives from the Wayne County 2nd district
- In office January 1, 1901 – 1902

Personal details
- Born: December 18, 1865 Ontario, Canada
- Died: September 21, 1928 (aged 62)
- Party: Republican
- Spouse: Mary Tireman

Frederick C. Martindale (December 18, 1865 – September 21, 1928) was an American politician who served as the 26th Secretary of State of Michigan from 1909 to 1914 as a member of the Republican Party. He previously served in both chambers of the Michigan Legislature.

== Early life ==
Martindale was born in Canada West on December 18, 1865. Martindale was born to parents Wales C. and Clara Martindale.

== Career ==
Martindale was a lawyer. On January 2, 1901, Martindale as sworn in as a member Republican of the Michigan House of Representatives from the Wayne County 2nd district. He served in this position until 1902. In 1902, Martindale unsuccessfully ran for position of the member of the Michigan Senate from the 1st district. On January 4, 1905, Martindale was sworn in to this position, which he served in until 1908. Martindale served as Michigan Secretary of State from 1909 to 1914.

== Personal life ==
Marindale married Mary Tireman.

== Death ==
Martindale killed himself via self-inflicted gunshot wound on September 21, 1928.
