= List of Mitt Romney 2012 presidential campaign endorsements =

This is a list of prominent people or groups who formally endorsed or voiced support for presidential hopeful Mitt Romney's 2012 presidential election campaign during the Republican Party primaries and the general election.

== Former U.S. presidents, vice presidents, and spouses ==
George H. W. Bush

George W. Bush

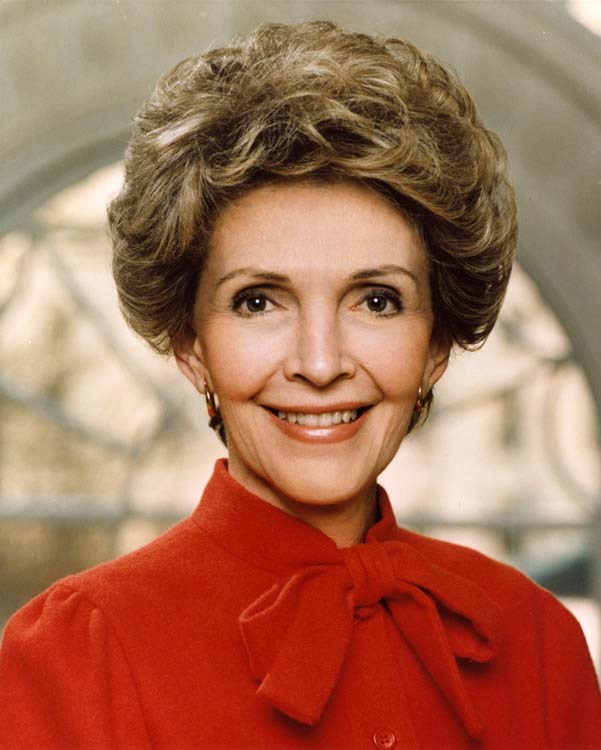
Nancy Reagan

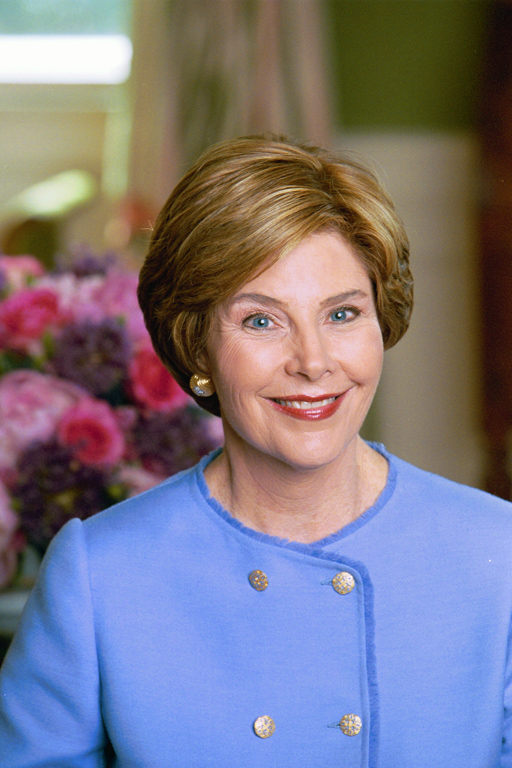
Laura Bush

- First Lady Barbara Bush
- President George H. W. Bush
- President George W. Bush
- First Lady Laura Bush
- Vice President Dick Cheney
- Vice President Dan Quayle
- First Lady Nancy Reagan
- Second Lady Lynne Cheney

== Former 2012 presidential candidates ==
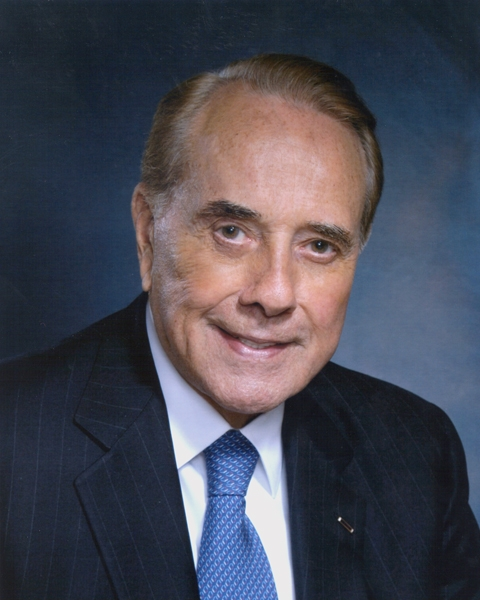
Bob Dole

- Representative Michele Bachmann of Minnesota
- Businessman Herman Cain of Georgia
- Fmr. Speaker of the House Newt Gingrich of Georgia
- Fmr. governor, fmr. ambassador to China, fmr. Ambassador to Singapore Jon Huntsman, Jr. of Utah
- Fmr. Representative Thaddeus McCotter of Michigan
- Fmr. Governor Tim Pawlenty of Minnesota
- Governor Rick Perry of Texas
- Fmr. Senator Rick Santorum of Pennsylvania

== U.S. senators ==
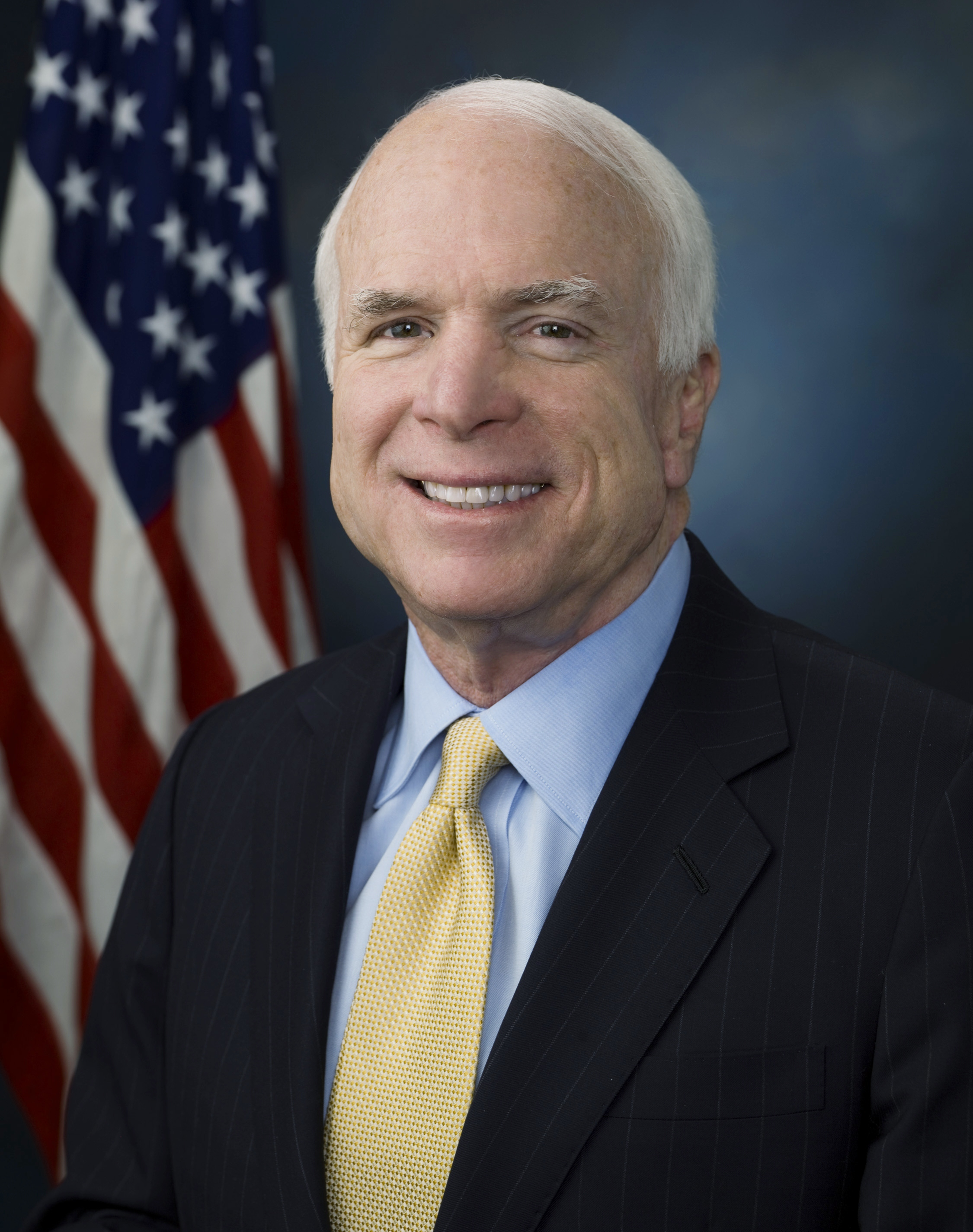
John McCain

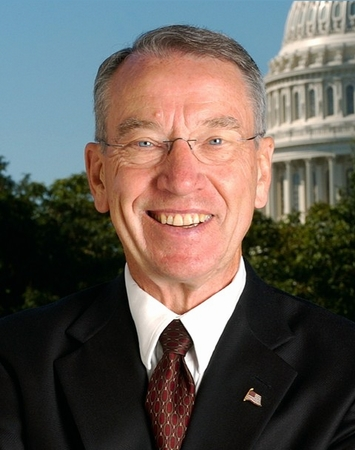
Chuck Grassley

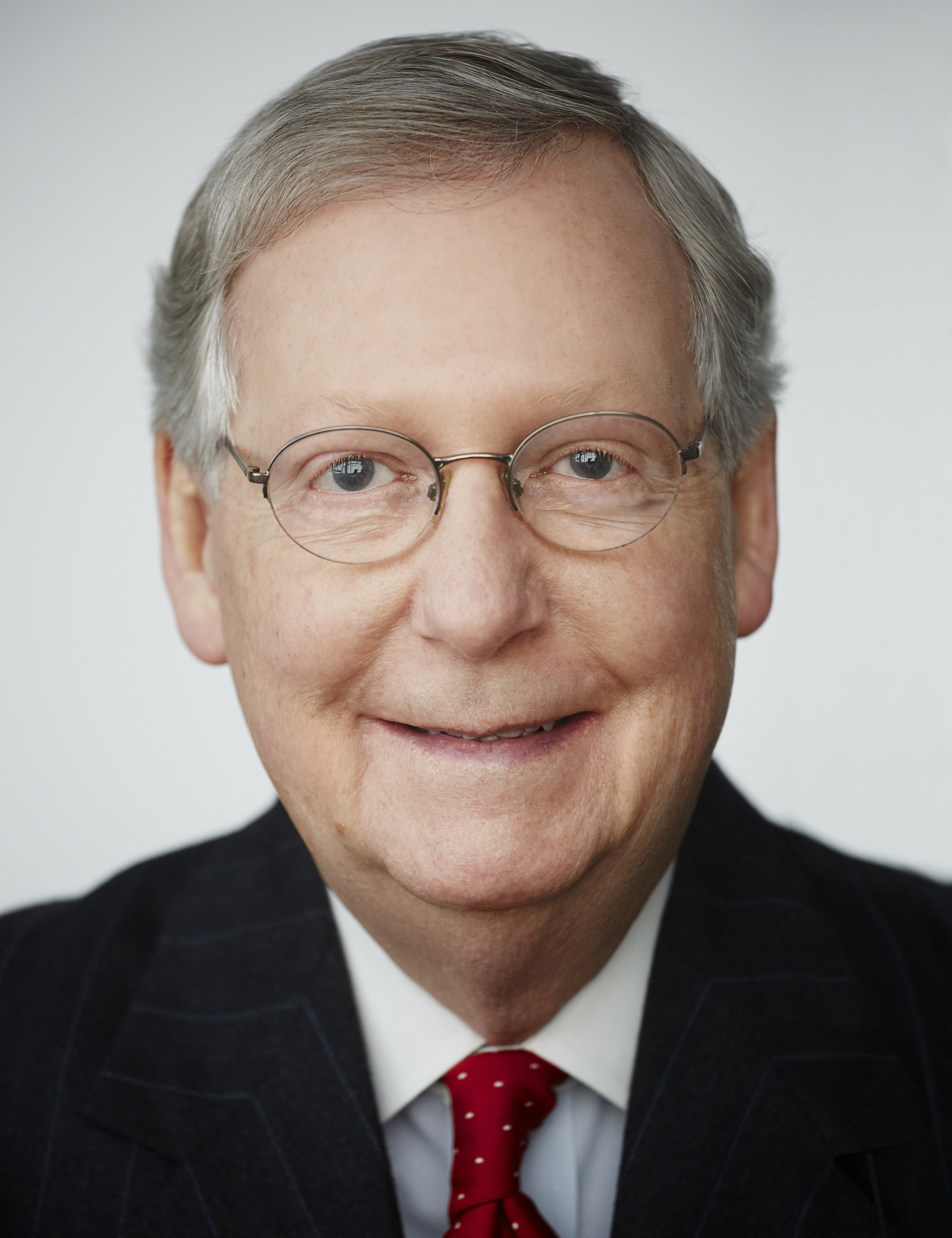
Mitch McConnell

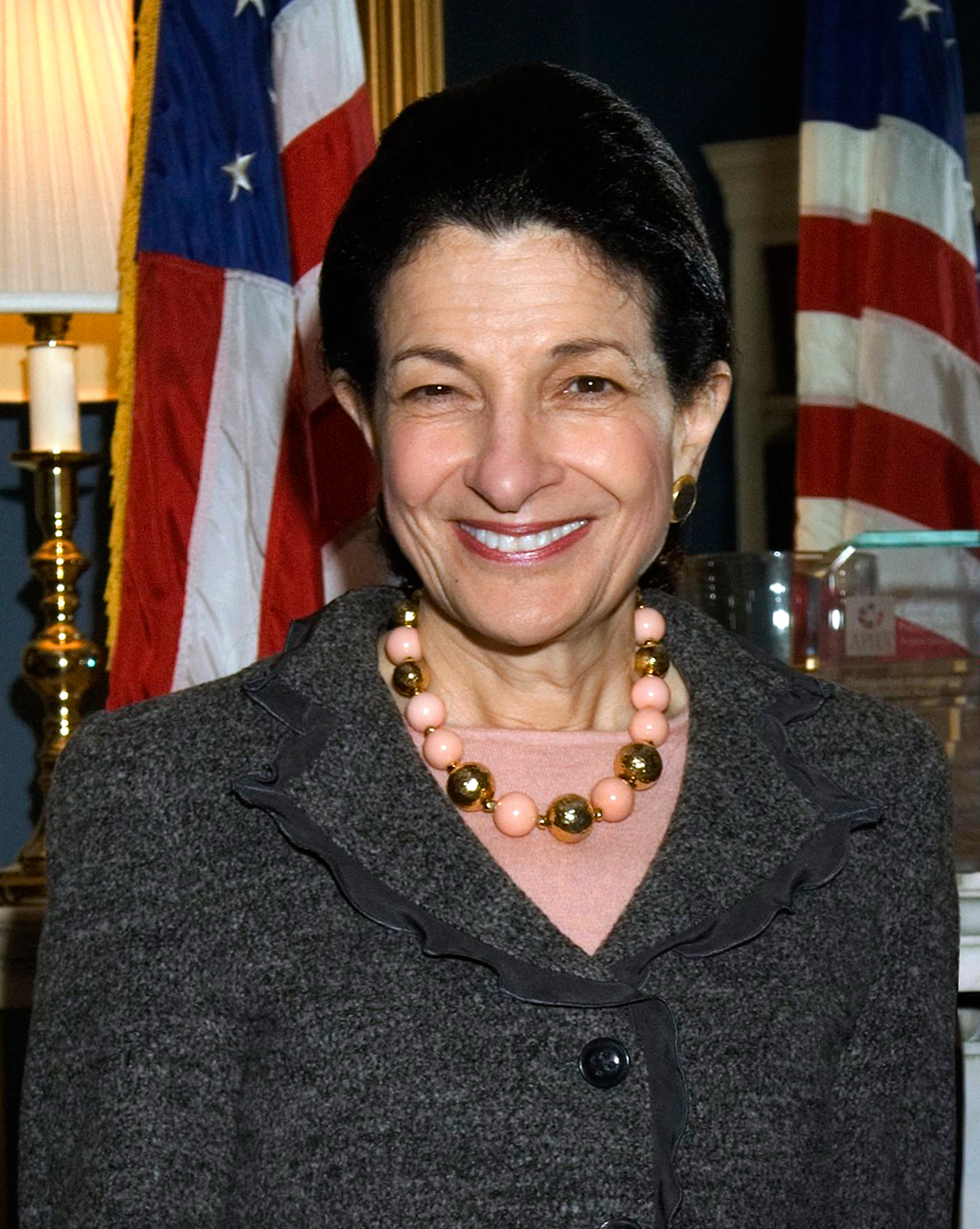
Olympia Snowe

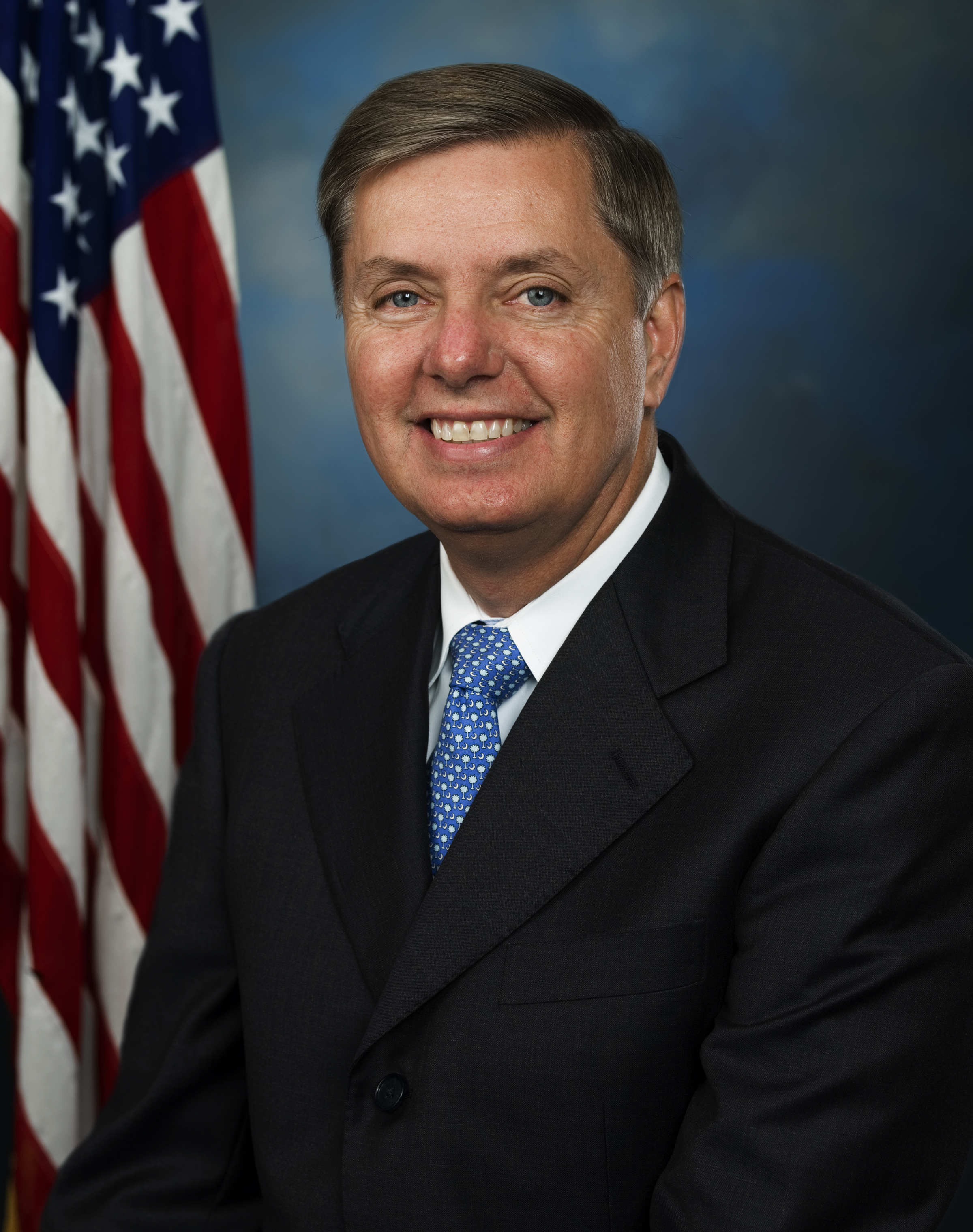
Lindsey Graham

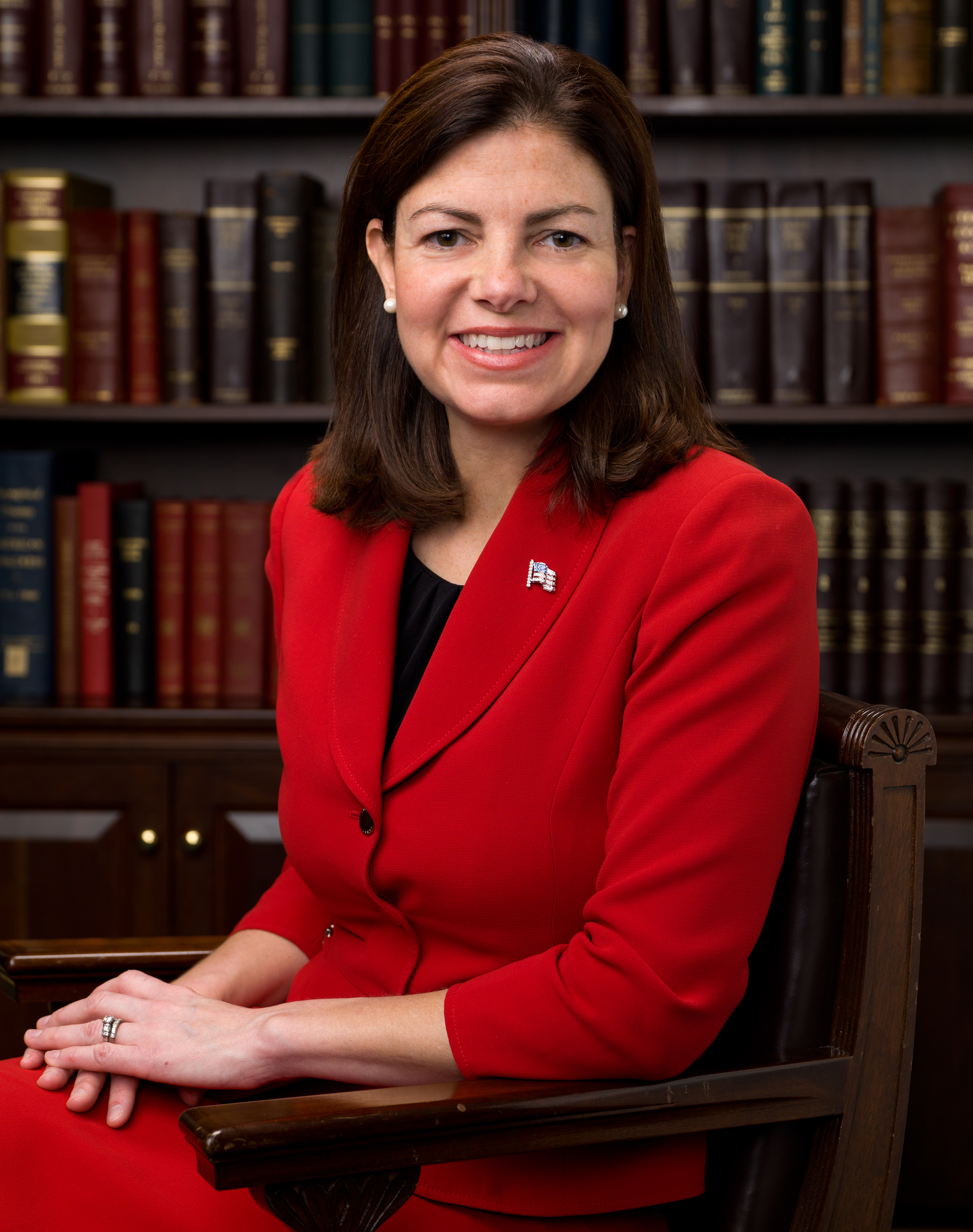
Kelly Ayotte

=== Incumbent senators in 2012 ===
- Lamar Alexander of Tennessee
- Kelly Ayotte of New Hampshire
- John Barrasso of Wyoming
- Roy Blunt of Missouri
- John Boozman of Arkansas
- Scott Brown of Massachusetts
- Richard Burr of North Carolina
- Saxby Chambliss of Georgia
- Tom Coburn of Oklahoma
- Thad Cochran of Mississippi
- Susan Collins of Maine
- John Cornyn of Texas
- Mike Enzi of Wyoming
- Lindsey Graham of South Carolina
- Chuck Grassley of Iowa
- Orrin Hatch of Utah
- Dean Heller of Nevada
- John Hoeven of North Dakota
- Kay Bailey Hutchison of Texas
- Jim Inhofe of Oklahoma
- Mike Johanns of Nebraska
- Ron Johnson of Wisconsin
- Mark Kirk of Illinois
- Jon Kyl of Arizona
- Mike Lee of Utah
- John McCain of Arizona, 2008 Republican presidential nominee
- Mitch McConnell of Kentucky, Senate Minority Leader
- Jerry Moran of Kansas
- Lisa Murkowski of Alaska
- Rand Paul of Kentucky, son of 2012 presidential candidate Ron Paul
- Rob Portman of Ohio
- Pat Roberts of Kansas
- Marco Rubio of Florida
- Jeff Sessions of Alabama
- Richard Shelby of Alabama
- Olympia Snowe of Maine
- John Thune of South Dakota
- Pat Toomey of Pennsylvania

=== Former ===
- Kit Bond of Missouri
- Harry F. Byrd, Jr. of Virginia (Independent)
- Ben Nighthorse Campbell of Colorado
- Norm Coleman of Minnesota
- Al D'Amato of New York
- Bob Dole, Senate majority leader, 1996 Republican presidential nominee and 1976 Republican vice presidential nominee Bob Dole of Kansas
- Elizabeth Dole of North Carolina
- Lauch Faircloth of North Carolina
- Judd Gregg of New Hampshire
- Senate Majority Leader Trent Lott of Mississippi
- Connie Mack III of Florida
- Mel Martinez of Florida
- Gordon Smith of Oregon
- Richard B. Stone of Florida
- John E. Sununu of New Hampshire
- Jim Talent of Missouri
- Fred Thompson of Tennessee

== U.S. representatives ==
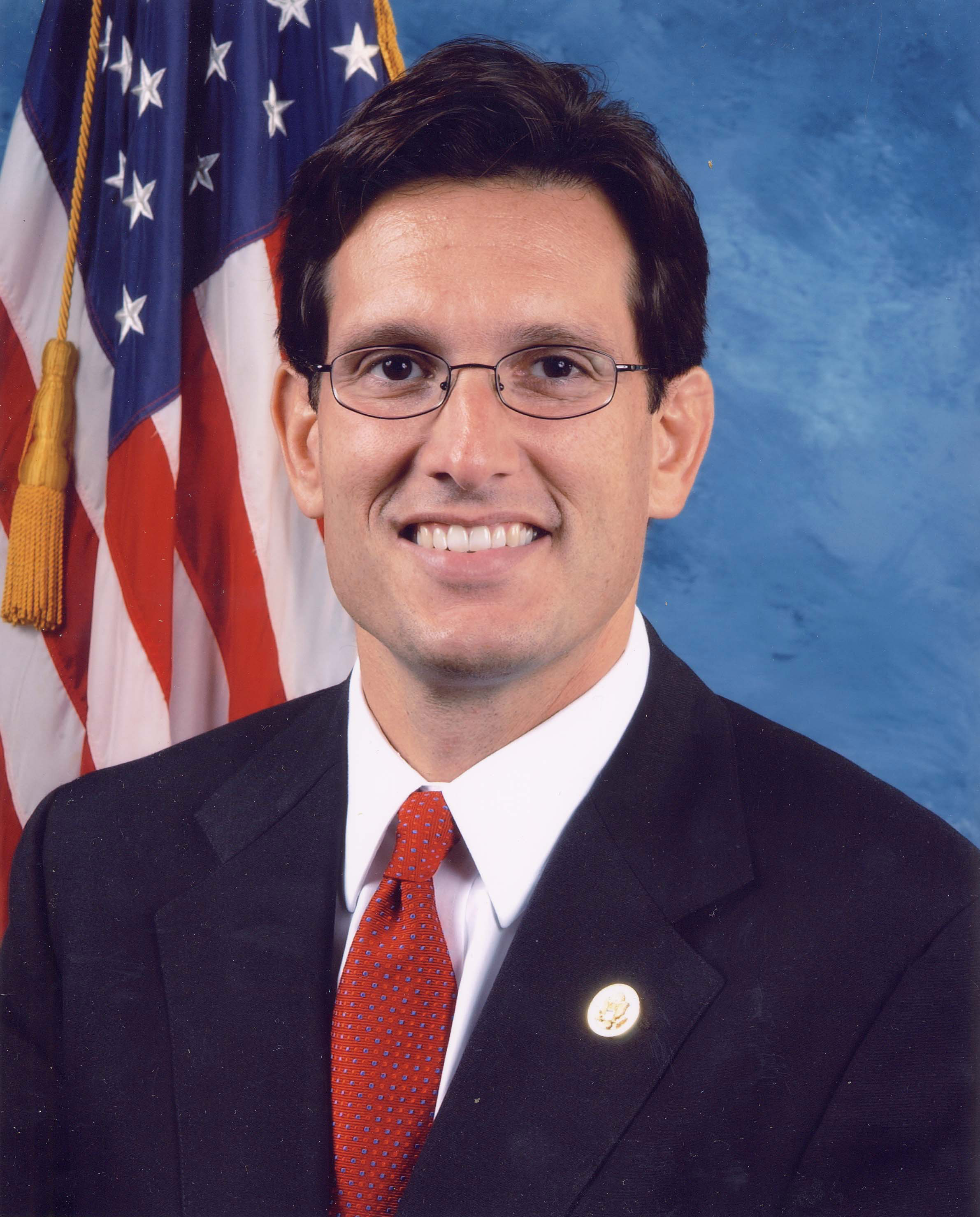
Eric Cantor

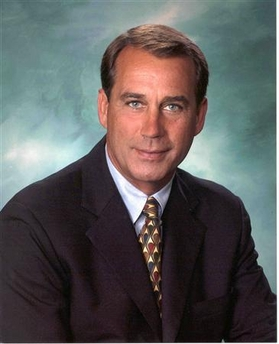
John Boehner

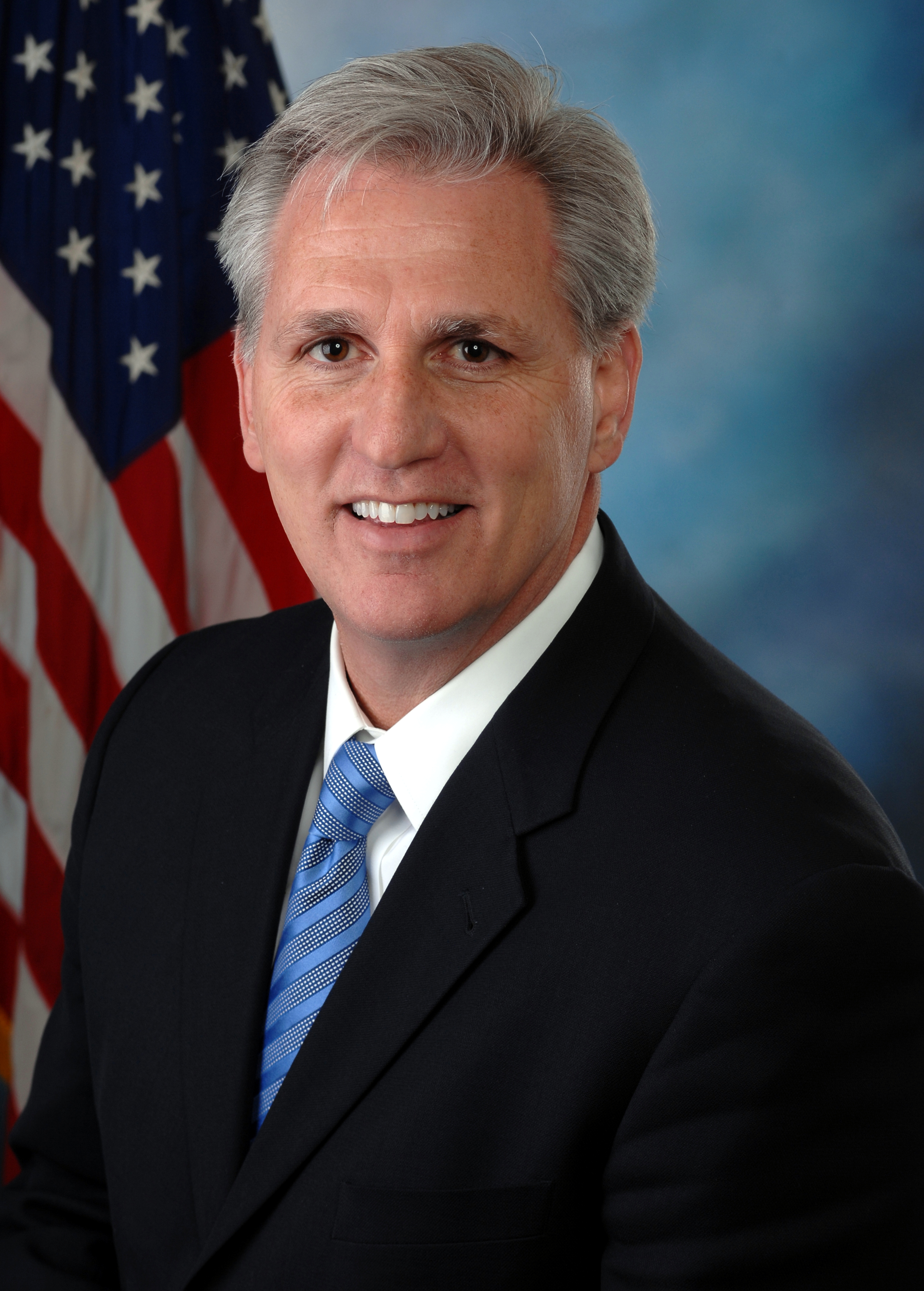
Kevin McCarthy

=== Incumbent U.S. representatives in 2012 ===
- Sandy Adams of Florida
- Rodney Alexander of Louisiana
- Justin Amash of Michigan
- Mark Amodei of Nevada
- Charles Bass of New Hampshire
- Judy Biggert of Illinois
- Brian Bilbray of California
- Rob Bishop of Utah
- Diane Black of Tennessee
- Marsha Blackburn of Tennessee
- Speaker of the United States House of Representatives John Boehner of Ohio
- Ann Marie Buerkle of New York
- Ken Calvert of California
- Dave Camp of Michigan, chairman of the House Committee on Ways and Means
- John B. T. Campbell III of California
- Quico Canseco of Texas
- House Majority Leader Eric Cantor of Virginia
- John Carter of Texas
- Jason Chaffetz of Utah
- Howard Coble of North Carolina
- Mike Conaway of Texas
- Rick Crawford of Arkansas
- Ander Crenshaw of Florida
- Jeff Denham of California
- Charlie Dent of Pennsylvania
- Scott DesJarlais of Tennessee
- Mario Díaz-Balart of Florida
- Robert Dold of Illinois
- Jimmy Duncan of Tennessee
- Renee Ellmers of North Carolina
- Jo Ann Emerson of Missouri
- Stephen Fincher of Tennessee
- Mike Fitzpatrick of Pennsylvania
- Jeff Flake of Arizona
- Jeff Fortenberry of Nebraska
- Virginia Foxx of North Carolina
- Elton Gallegly of California
- Cory Gardner of Colorado
- Jim Gerlach of Pennsylvania
- Bob Gibbs of Ohio
- Bob Goodlatte of Virginia
- Kay Granger of Texas
- Timothy Griffin of Arkansas
- Morgan Griffith of Virginia
- Michael Grimm of New York
- Richard Hanna of New York
- Vicky Hartzler of Missouri
- Nan Hayworth of New York
- Joe Heck of Nevada
- Wally Herger of California
- Jaime Herrera Beutler of Washington
- Bill Huizenga of Michigan
- Randy Hultgren of Illinois
- Duncan D. Hunter of California
- Darrell Issa of California, chairman of the House Committee on Oversight and Government Reform
- Lynn Jenkins of Kansas
- Jack Kingston of Georgia
- Raul Labrador of Idaho
- Leonard Lance of New Jersey
- Tom Latham of Iowa
- Steve LaTourette of Ohio
- Jerry Lewis of California, former chairman of the House Committee on Appropriations
- Billy Long of Missouri
- Frank Lucas of Oklahoma
- Cynthia Lummis of Wyoming
- Connie Mack IV of Florida
- Mary Bono Mack of California
- Kevin McCarthy of California, House Majority Whip
- Patrick McHenry of North Carolina
- Howard McKeon of California, chairman of the House Committee on Armed Services
- Cathy McMorris Rodgers of Washington
- John Mica of Florida, chairman of the House Committee on Transportation and Infrastructure
- Candice Miller of Michigan
- Jeff Miller of Florida
- Shelley Moore Capito of West Virginia
- Mick Mulvaney of South Carolina
- Sue Myrick of North Carolina
- Randy Neugebauer of Texas
- Kristi Noem of South Dakota
- Pete Olson of Texas
- Erik Paulsen of Minnesota
- Denny Rehberg of Montana
- Dave Reichert of Washington
- Jim Renacci of Ohio
- Reid Ribble of Wisconsin
- Martha Roby of Alabama
- Phil Roe of Tennessee
- Hal Rogers of Kentucky, chairman of the House Committee on Appropriations
- Mike Rogers of Michigan
- Mike D. Rogers of Alabama
- Dana Rohrabacher of California
- Todd Rokita of Indiana
- Tom Rooney of Florida
- Ileana Ros-Lehtinen of Florida
- Dennis A. Ross of Florida
- Paul Ryan of Wisconsin, chairman of the House Committee on the Budget
- Jean Schmidt of Ohio
- Aaron Schock of Illinois
- Tim Scott of South Carolina
- Pete Sessions of Texas, chairman of the National Republican Congressional Committee
- John Shimkus of Illinois
- Mike Simpson of Idaho
- Lamar S. Smith of Texas, chairman of the House Committee on the Judiciary
- Steve Southerland of Florida
- Marlin Stutzman of Indiana
- Mac Thornberry of Texas
- Scott Tipton of Colorado
- Mike Turner of Ohio
- Fred Upton of Michigan, chairman of the House Committee on Energy and Commerce
- Tim Walberg of Michigan
- Greg Walden of Oregon
- Allen West of Florida
- Ed Whitfield of Kentucky
- Steve Womack of Arkansas

=== Former ===
- Bob Barr of Georgia, 2008 Libertarian presidential nominee
- Bob Beauprez of Colorado
- Michael Castle of Delaware
- Dick Cheney of Wyoming
- Artur Davis of Alabama
- Lawrence J. DeNardis of Connecticut
- Lincoln Díaz-Balart of Florida
- Charles Djou of Hawaii
- Jack Edwards of Alabama
- Vern Ehlers of Michigan
- David F. Emery of Maine
- Phil English of Pennsylvania
- Mark Green of Wisconsin
- Tommy Hartnett of South Carolina
- Speaker of the House Dennis Hastert of Illinois
- Sue W. Kelly of New York
- Joe Knollenberg of Michigan
- Rick Lazio of New York
- Ronald Machtley of Rhode Island
- Guy Molinari of New York
- Susan Molinari of New York
- George Nethercutt of Washington
- E. Clay Shaw, Jr. of Florida
- Chris Shays of Connecticut
- Rob Simmons of Connecticut
- James Stanton of Ohio (Democratic)
- Vin Weber of Minnesota

== Governors ==
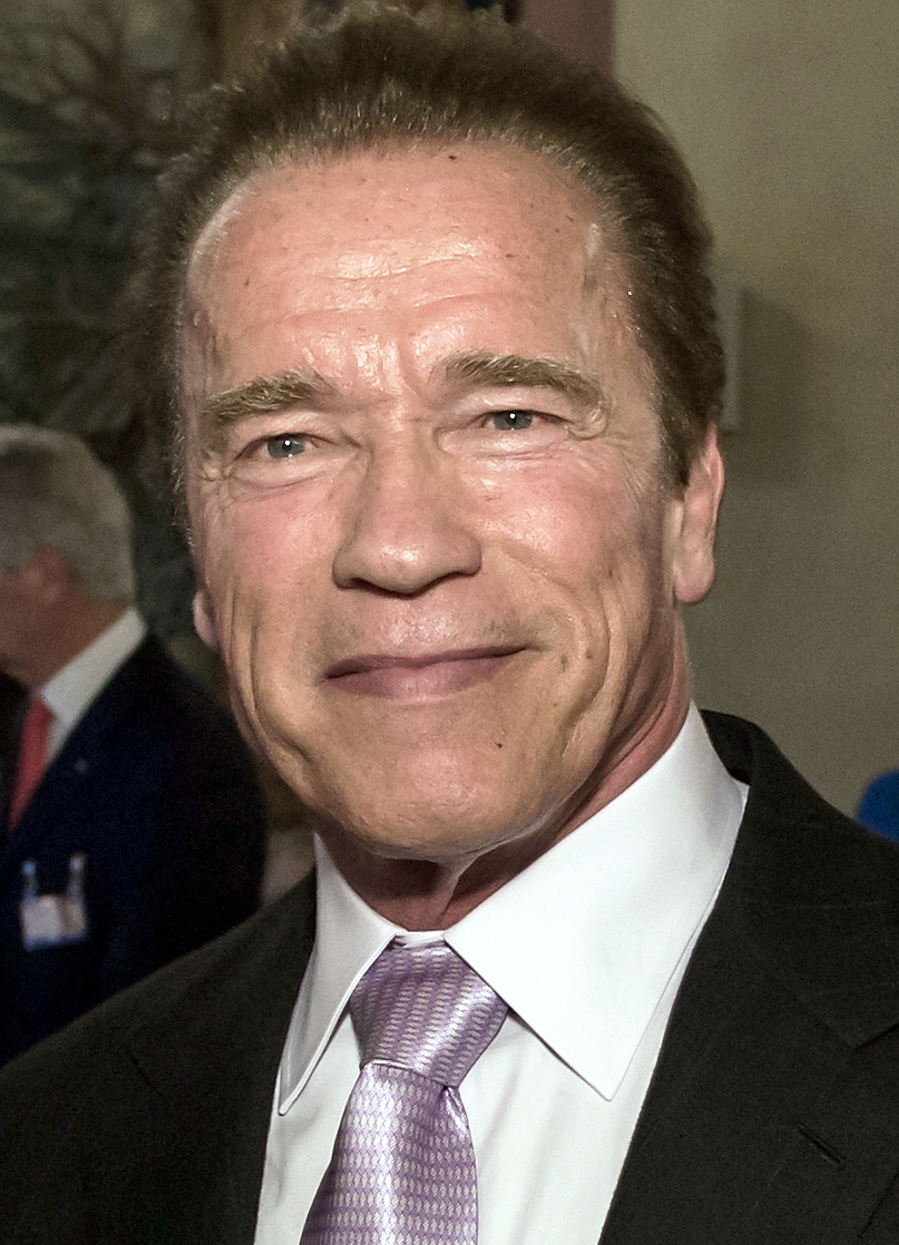
Arnold Schwarzenegger

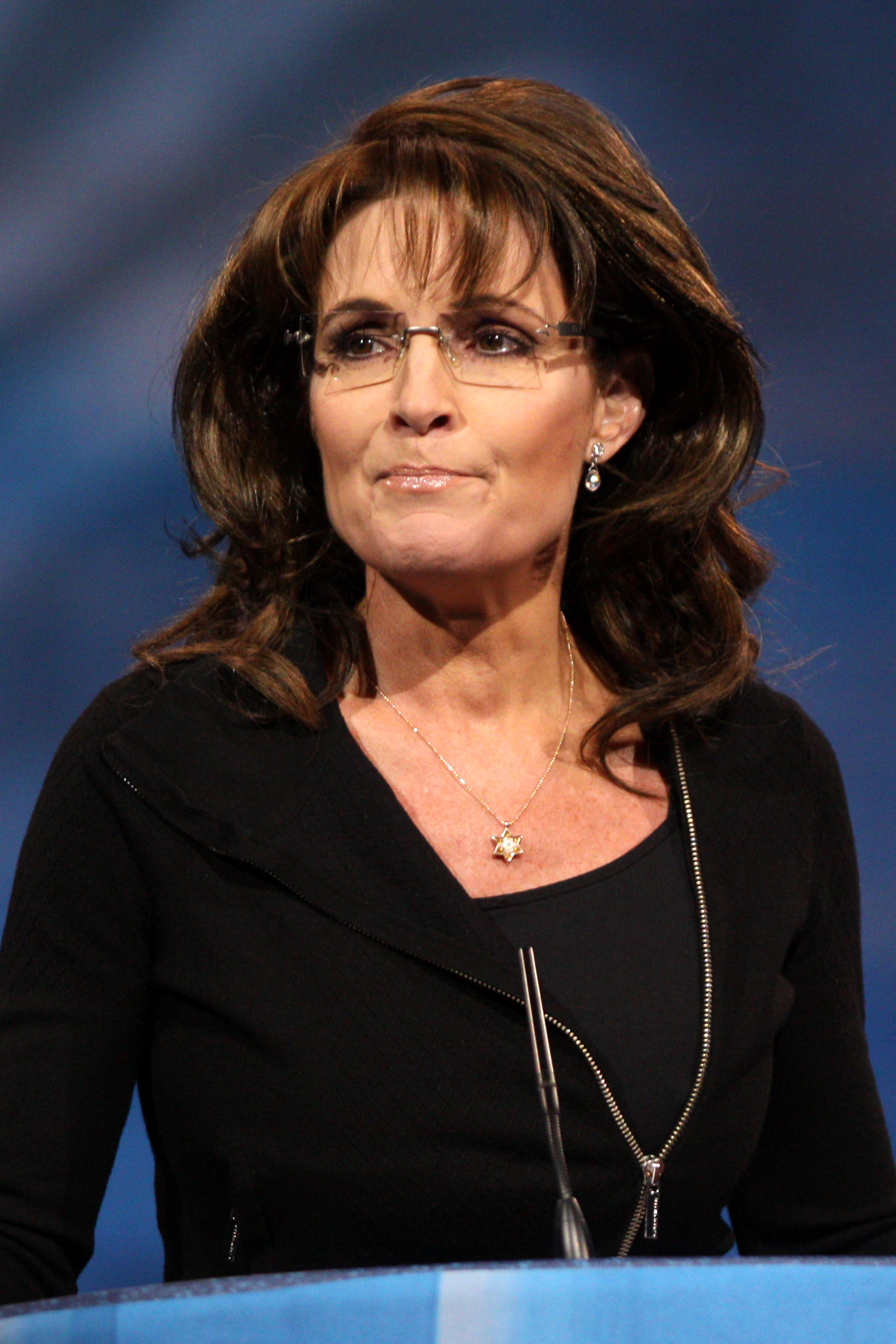
Sarah Palin

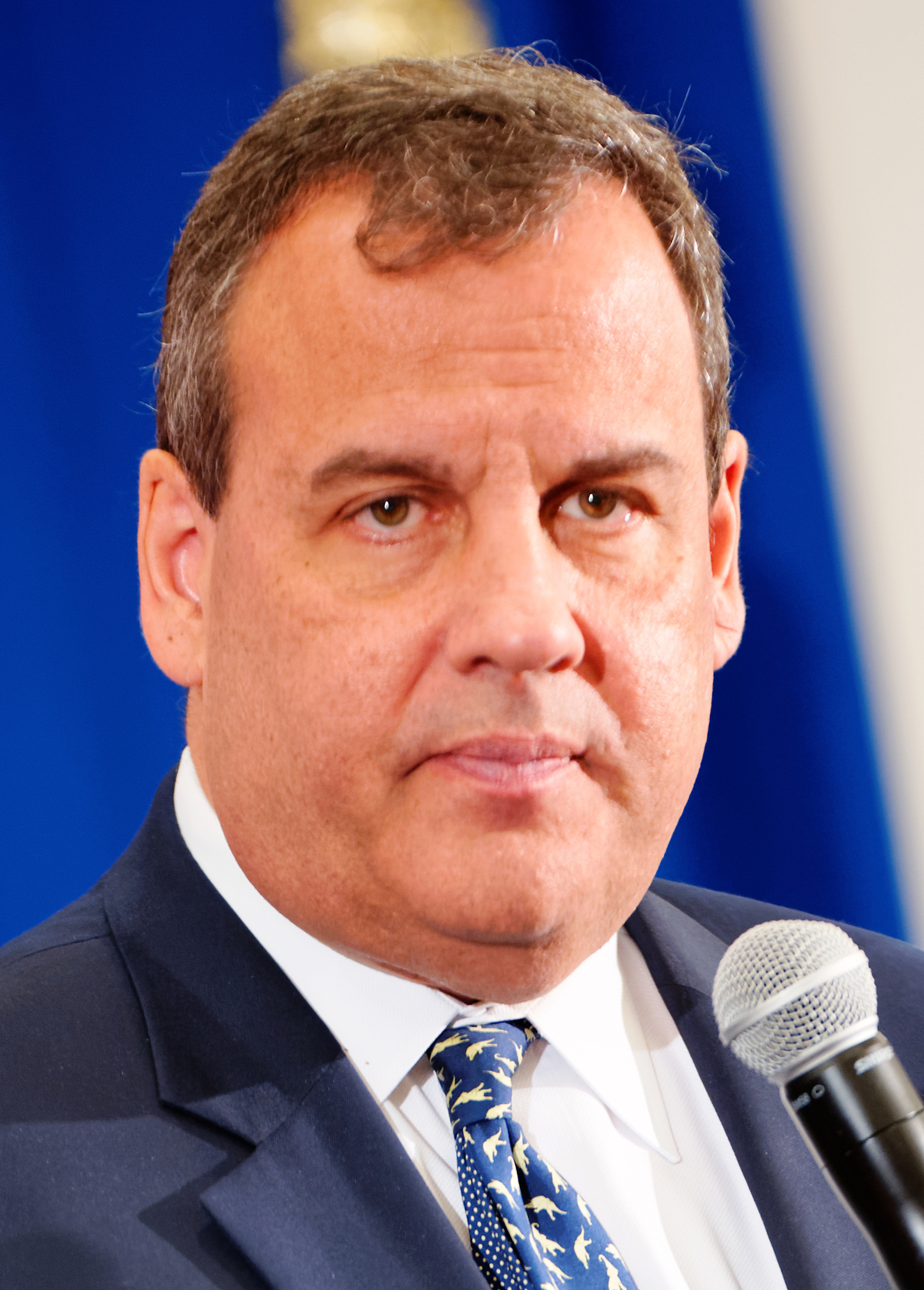
Chris Christie

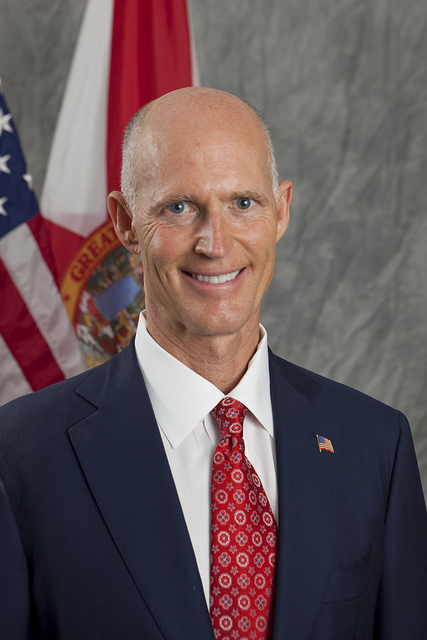
Rick Scott

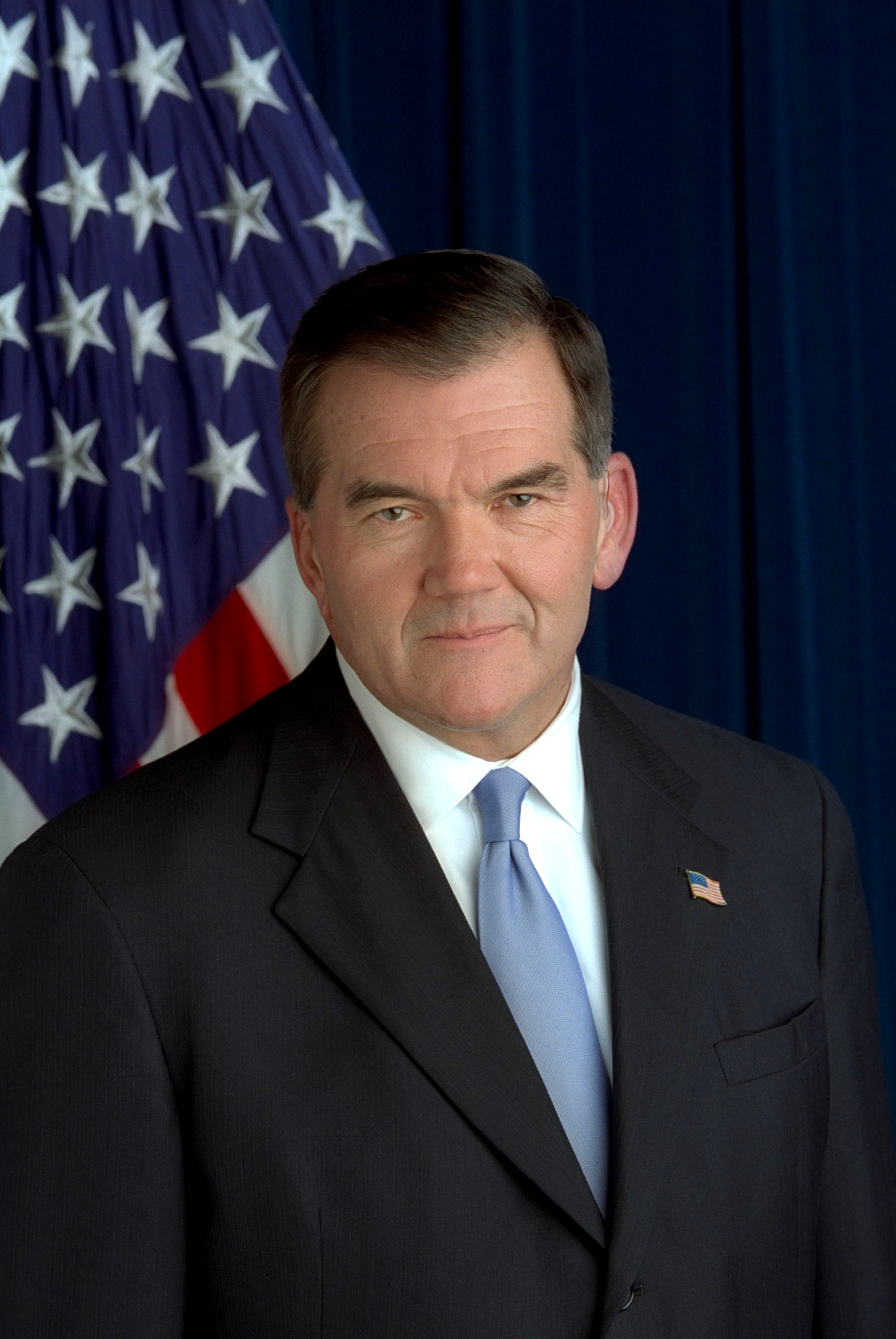
Tom Ridge

=== Incumbent governors in 2012 ===
- Terry Branstad of Iowa
- Jan Brewer of Arizona
- Phil Bryant of Mississippi
- Eddie Calvo of Guam
- Chris Christie of New Jersey
- Tom Corbett of Pennsylvania
- Jack Dalrymple of North Dakota
- Mitch Daniels of Indiana
- Nathan Deal of Georgia
- Mary Fallin of Oklahoma
- Benigno Fitial of the Northern Mariana Islands
- Luis Fortuño of Puerto Rico
- Nikki Haley of South Carolina
- Bill Haslam of Tennessee
- Dave Heineman of Nebraska
- Gary Herbert of Utah
- Bobby Jindal of Louisiana
- John Kasich of Ohio
- Paul LePage of Maine
- Susana Martinez of New Mexico
- Bob McDonnell of Virginia
- Matt Mead of Wyoming
- Butch Otter of Idaho
- Brian Sandoval of Nevada
- Rick Scott of Florida
- Rick Snyder of Michigan
- Scott Walker of Wisconsin

=== Former ===
- Vic Atiyeh of Oregon
- Jeb Bush of Florida
- George Deukmejian of California
- Bob Ehrlich of Maryland
- Frank Keating of Oklahoma
- Judy Martz of Montana
- Zell Miller of Georgia
- Bill Owens of Colorado
- Sarah Palin of Alaska, 2008 Republican vice presidential nominee
- George Pataki of New York
- Marc Racicot of Montana
- Robert D. Ray of Iowa
- Fmr. Secretary of Homeland Security Tom Ridge of Pennsylvania
- Arnold Schwarzenegger of California
- Mark Schweiker of Pennsylvania
- John H. Sununu of New Hampshire
- William F. Weld of Massachusetts
- Pete Wilson of California
- Dale E. Wolf of Delaware

== State, local and territory officials ==
- Greg Abbott, Texas attorney general, future governor of Texas
- Patrick Abrami, New Hampshire state representative
- Cindy Acree, Colorado state representative
- Dawn Marie Addiego, New Jersey state senator
- J.D. Alexander, Florida state senator
- Diane B. Allen, New Jersey state senator
- George Amedore, New York assemblyman
- Eric Anderson, New Hampshire state representative
- Marlene Anielski, Ohio state representative
- Joe Arpaio, sheriff of Maricopa County, Arizona
- Troy Balderson, Ohio state senator
- William Barclay, New York assemblyman
- Jack Barnes, New Hampshire state senator
- Kip Bateman, New Jersey state senator
- Jennifer Beck, New Jersey state senator
- Peter Beck, Ohio state representative
- Greg Bell, Utah lieutenant governor
- Ken Bennett, Arizona secretary of state
- Mike Bennett, Florida state senator
- Tom Berryhill, California state senator
- Bruce Bickford, Maine state representative
- Sam Blakeslee, California state senator
- Louis Blessing, Jr., Ohio speaker of the House pro tempore
- Donna Boley, West Virginia state senator
- Bill Bolling, Virginia lieutenant governor
- Pam Bondi, Florida attorney general
- Phil Boyle, New York assemblyman
- Peter Bragdon, New Hampshire Senate president
- Greg Brower, Nevada state senator
- Doug Broxson, Florida state representative
- Anthony R. Bucco, New Jersey state senator
- David Burke, Ohio state senator
- Dan Burling, New York assemblyman
- Harold Burns, fmr. New Hampshire speaker of the House
- Mark Butler, New York assemblyman
- Casey Cagle, Georgia lieutenant governor
- Nancy Calhoun, New York assemblywoman
- Brian Calley, Michigan lieutenant governor
- Anthony Cannella, California state senator
- Jennifer Carroll, Florida lieutenant governor
- Sharon Carson, New Hampshire state senator
- Stefani Carter, Texas state representative
- Robert Castelli, New York assemblyman
- Richard Cebra, Maine state representative
- Barbara Cegavske, Nevada state senator
- Andrew R. Ciesla, New Jersey state senator
- Marti Coley, Florida state representative
- Ron Collins, Maine state senator
- Christopher J. Connors, New Jersey state senator
- Jim Conte, New York assemblyman
- Connie Conway, California Assembly Republican leader
- Paul Cook, California assemblyman
- Steve Cooley, Los Angeles district attorney
- Richard Corcoran, Florida state representative
- Jane Corwin, New York assemblywoman
- Fred Costello, Florida state representative
- Joe Courtney, Maine Senate majority leader
- Dean Cray, Maine state representative
- Steve Crisafulli, Florida state representative
- Ted Cruz, fmr. Texas solicitor general & 2012 Republican nominee for U.S. Senate
- William Current, North Carolina state representative
- Jay Dardenne, Louisiana lieutenant governor
- Alberta Darling, Wisconsin state senator
- Mark Darr, Arkansas lieutenant governor
- Daniel Davis, Florida state representative
- Timothy Derickson, Ohio state representative
- Nancy Detert, Florida state senator
- José Félix Díaz, Florida state representative
- Jimmy Dixon, North Carolina state representative
- Jim Donnelly, fmr. Maine House Republican leader
- Chris Dorworth, Florida state representative
- Mike Duffey, Ohio state representative
- Ed Dupont, fmr. New Hampshire Senate president
- Janet Duprey, New York assemblywoman
- Bill Emmerson, California state senator
- Gary Finch, New York assemblyman
- Stacey Fitts, Maine state representative
- Mike Fleck, Pennsylvania state representative
- Anitere Flores, Florida state senator
- Leslie Fossel, Maine state representative
- Ken Fredette, Maine state representative
- Jim Frishe, Florida state representative
- Jean Fuller, California state senator
- Ted Gaines, California state senator
- John Gallus, New Hampshire state senator
- Bob Gardner, Colorado state representative
- Randy Gardner, Ohio state representative
- Cheri Gerou, Colorado state representative
- Joe Giglio, New York assemblyman
- Karen Gillmor, Ohio state senator
- Ed Goedhart, Nevada state representative
- Anne Gonzales, Ohio state representative
- Eduardo Gonzalez, Florida state representative
- Bruce Goodwin, Ohio state representative
- Al Graf, New York assemblyman
- Cheryl Grossman, Ohio state representative
- Bob Hackett, Ohio state representative
- Curt Hagman, California assemblyman
- Scott Hammond, Nevada state representative
- Bill Hardiman, fmr. Michigan state senator
- Cresent Hardy, Nevada state representative
- Joe Hardy, Nevada state senator
- Tom Harman, California state senator
- Shawn Harrison, Florida state representative
- Steve Hawley, New York assemblyman
- Kerry Healey, fmr. Massachusetts lieutenant governor
- Dave Hess, fmr. New Hampshire House majority leader
- Pat Hickey, Nevada state representative
- Dov Hikind, New York assemblyman
- Richard Hollington, Ohio state representative
- James W. Holzapfel, New Jersey state senator
- Ed Hooper, Florida state representative
- Tom Horne, Arizona attorney general
- Jay Hottinger, Ohio state representative
- Mike Hubbard, Alabama speaker of the House of Representatives
- Kay Ivey, Alabama lieutenant governor, fmr. Alabama state treasurer
- Shawn Jasper, New Hampshire Deputy House majority leader
- Kevin Jeffries, California assemblyman
- Peter Johnson, Maine state representative
- Shannon Jones, Ohio state senator
- Tony Jordan, New York assemblyman
- Sean T. Kean, New Jersey state senator
- Thomas Kean, New Jersey state senator
- Jim Kerr, Colorado state representative
- Ben Kieckhefer, Nevada state senator
- Peter Kinder, Missouri lieutenant governor
- Steve King, Colorado state senator
- Kelly Kite, Nevada state representative
- Rebecca Kleefisch, Wisconsin lieutenant governor
- Brian Kolb, New York Assembly minority leader
- Brian Krolicki, Nevada lieutenant governor
- Joseph M. Kyrillos, New Jersey state senator
- Gary Lambert, New Hampshire state senator
- Al Landis, Ohio state representative
- Larry Liston, Colorado state representative
- Pete Livermore, Nevada state representative
- Ana Rivas Logan, Florida state representative
- Daniel Losquadro, New York assemblyman
- Mia Love, mayor of Saratoga Springs, UT & 2012 Republican nominee for U.S. House
- Evelyn Lynn, Florida state senator
- Tom Massey, Colorado state representative
- Charles McBurney, Florida state representative
- Danny McComas, North Carolina state representative
- Pat McElraft, North Carolina state representative
- Mike McGinness, Nevada state senator
- Ross McGregor, Ohio state representative
- Frank McNulty, Colorado speaker of the House of Representatives
- Larry Metz, Florida state representative
- Marc Molinaro, New York assemblyman
- Mike Montesano, New York assemblyman
- Betty Montgomery, fmr. Ohio attorney general
- Tim Moore, North Carolina state representative
- Chuck Morse, New Hampshire state senator
- Richard Mourdock, Indiana treasurer & 2012 Republican nominee for U.S. Senate
- Carole Murray, Colorado state representative
- Dean Murray, New York assemblyman
- Pat Neal, fmr. Florida state senator
- Peter Nehr, Florida state representative
- Bryan Nelson, Florida state representative
- Craig Newbold, Ohio state representative
- Tom Niehaus, Ohio Senate president
- Jim Nielsen, California assemblyman
- David Nohe, West Virginia state senator & fmr. mayor of Vienna, WV
- Jeanette Nunez, Florida state representative
- Bob Oaks, New York assemblyman
- José R. Oliva, Florida state representative
- Steven V. Oroho, New Jersey state senator
- Kevin J. O'Toole, New Jersey state senator
- Kathleen Passidomo, Florida state representative
- Jimmy Patronis, Florida state representative
- Russell Pearce, Arizona state senator
- Joseph Pennacchio, New Jersey state senator
- Jason Perillo, Connecticut state representative
- Ray Pilon, Florida state representative
- Bruce Poliquin, Maine treasurer
- Stephen Precourt, Florida state representative
- Kevin Priola, Colorado state representative
- Adam Putnam, Florida commissioner of agriculture
- Jack Quinn III, fmr. New York assemblyman
- Robert Ramirez, Colorado state representative
- Lake Ray, Florida state representative
- Tate Reeves, Mississippi lieutenant governor
- Kim Reynolds, Iowa lieutenant governor
- Dean Rhoads, Nevada state senator
- Garrett Richter, Florida state senator
- Michael Roberson, Nevada state senator
- George Roberts, fmr. New Hampshire speaker of the House
- Patrick Rooney, Florida state representative
- Richard Rosen, Maine state senator
- Cliff Rosenberger, Ohio state representative
- Sharon Runner, California state senator
- Dan Rutherford, Illinois state treasurer
- Teresa Sayward, New York assemblywoman
- Doug Scamman, fmr. New Hampshire speaker of the House
- Bill Schuette, Michigan attorney general
- Tom Scott, fmr. West Virginia state senator
- Mark Sherwood, Nevada state representative
- Jim Silva, California assemblyman
- Robert W. Singer, New Jersey state senator
- Becky Skillman, Indiana lieutenant governor
- Lois Snowe-Mello, Maine state senator
- Gerald Stebelton, Ohio state representative
- Lynn Stewart, Nevada state representative
- Tony Strickland, California state senator
- Spencer Swalm, Colorado state representative
- Donna Sytek, fmr. New Hampshire speaker of the House
- Josh Tardy, fmr. Maine House Republican leader
- Mary Taylor, Ohio lieutenant governor
- John Thrasher, Florida state senator
- Thom Tillis, North Carolina speaker of the House
- Lou Tobacco, New York assemblyman
- John Tobia, Florida state representative
- John B. Tucker, fmr. New Hampshire speaker of the House
- Tommy Tucker, North Carolina state senator
- Donald P. Wagner, California assemblyman
- Mark Wagoner, Ohio state senator
- Mark Waller, Colorado state representative
- Raymond Walter, New York assemblyman
- Mimi Walters, California state senator
- Will Weatherford, Florida speaker designate
- Mike Weinstein, Florida state representative
- Jean White, Colorado state senator
- Chris Widener, Ohio state senator
- Michael L. Williams, Texas commissioner of education, Fmr. Texas railroad commissioner
- Stephen Wise, Florida state senator
- Kevin Witkos, Connecticut state senator
- Melissa Woodbury, Nevada state representative
- Mark Wyland, California state senator
- Dave Yost, Ohio state auditor

== Mayors/vice mayors ==
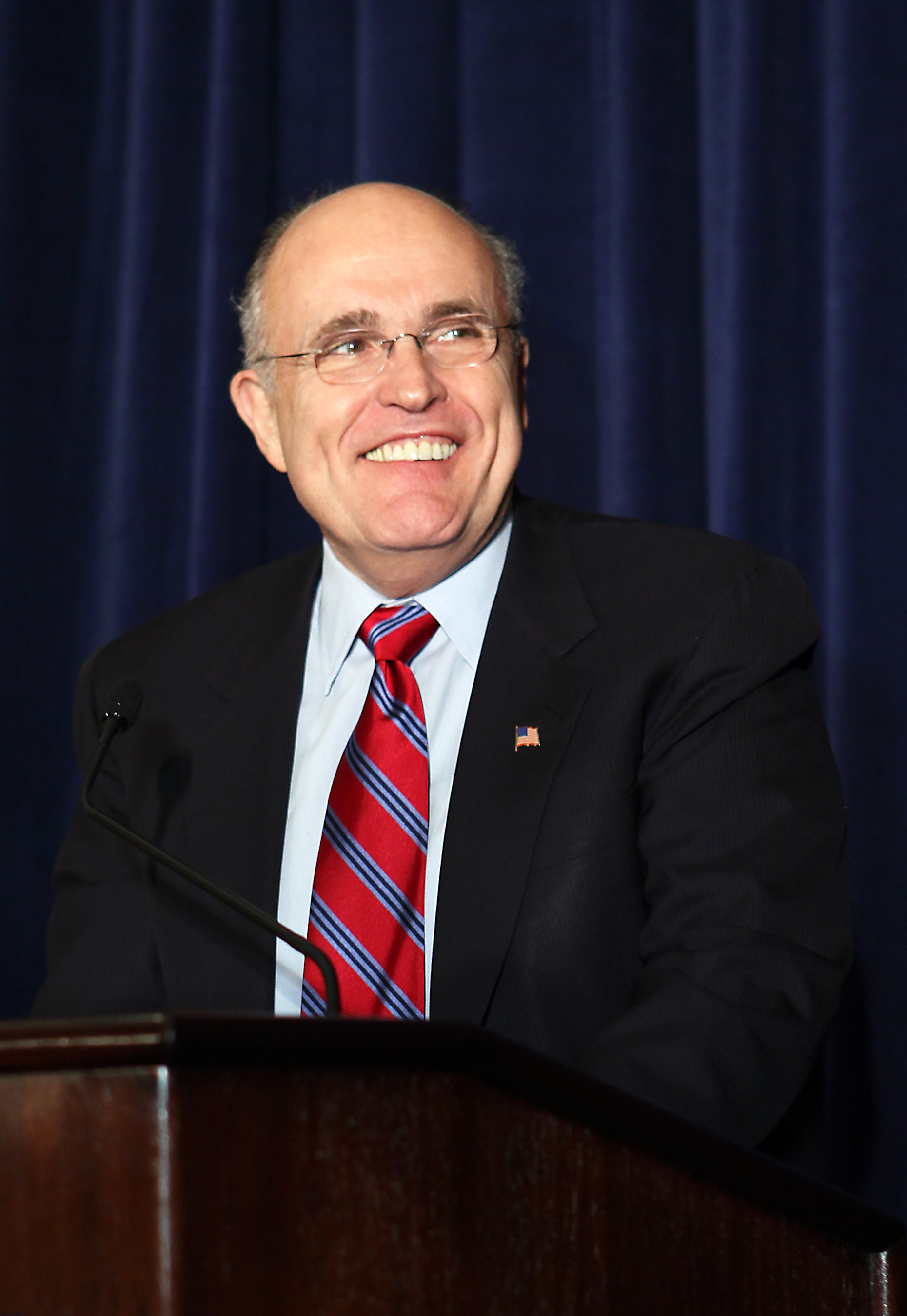
Rudy Giuliani

- Fmr. Mayor of Los Angeles Richard Riordan
- Dan Sullivan of Anchorage, Alaska
- Fmr. mayor of New York City Rudy Giuliani
- Mayor of Danbury, CT Mark Boughton
- Mayor of New Britain, CT Tim Stewart
- Mayor of Norwalk, CT Dick Moccia
- Mayor of Torrington, CT Ryan Bingham
- Mayor of Hialeah, FL Carlos Hernandez
- Mayor of Miami Lakes, FL Michael Pizzi
- Former St. Petersburg, FL Mayor Rick Baker
- Vice-mayor of Miami Springs, FL Dan Espino
- Mayor of Wheeling, WV Andy McKenzie
- Mayor of Ripley, WV Carolyn Rader
- Mayor of Elkins, WV Judy Guye Swanson
- Mayor of Huntington, WV Kim Wolfe
- Former mayor of Marlinton, WV Dottie Kellison

== Publications ==
See: Newspaper endorsements in the United States presidential election, 2012

== National political figures and former cabinet officials ==
- Fmr. Ambassador to Spain George Argyros
- Fmr. Attorney General and Fmr. Missouri Governor and Senator John Ashcroft
- Fmr. White House Chief of Staff, fmr. Secretary of the Treasury, fmr. Secretary of State James Baker
- Fmr. Attorney General William Barr
- Fmr. Administrator of the U.S. Small Business Administration Hector Barreto
- Fmr. Director of the CIA Counter-Terrorism Center, fmr. United States Department of State Coordinator for Counter-Terrorism Cofer Black
- Fmr. Solicitor General, fmr. acting Attorney General, fmr. Justice on the Court of Appeals for the District of Columbia Circuit, fmr. Reagan Supreme Court nominee Robert Bork
- Fmr. Treasurer of the United States Bay Buchanan
- Fmr. Ambassador to the Czech Republic William J. Cabaniss
- Fmr. Treasurer of the United States Anna Escobedo Cabral
- Fmr. Ambassador to Denmark James P. Cain
- Fmr. United States Secretary of Homeland Security Michael Chertoff
- Fmr. Ambassador to Costa Rica Peter Cianchette
- Fmr. Defense Policy Advisory Board member, fmr. Counselor of the United States Department of State Eliot A. Cohen
- Los Angeles District Attorney Steve Cooley
- Fmr. Ambassador to the Netherlands James Culbertson
- Fmr. Under Secretary of Defense for Policy, fmr. Ambassador to Turkey, fmr. Ambassador to Finland Eric Edelman
- Fmr. Massachusetts Workforce Secretary Jane Edmonds
- Fmr. Deputy Attorney General Mark Filip
- Fmr. Assistant Attorney General Alice Fisher
- Fmr. Mayor of Boston, fmr. Ambassador to the Holy See Raymond Flynn
- Fmr. Ambassador to Ireland Tom Foley
- Fmr. Ambassador to Belgium Sam Fox
- Fmr. Ambassador to Malta Anthony H. Gioia
- Fmr. Ambassador to the Holy See Mary Ann Glendon
- Fmr. Administrator of the National Aeronautics and Space Administration Michael D. Griffin
- Fmr. Secretary of Commerce Carlos Gutierrez
- Fmr. Director of the National Security Agency, fmr. Director of the Central Intelligence Agency Michael Hayden
- Fmr. Massachusetts Secretary of Environmental Affairs Ellen Roy Herzfelder
- Fmr. Ambassador to Jamaica Brenda LaGrange Johnson
- Fmr. Ambassador to Belgium Tom Korologos
- Fmr. Ambassador to Barbados Mary Kramer
- Fmr. Ambassador to Latvia Chuck Larson
- Fmr. Ambassador to France Howard Leach
- Fmr. Secretary of the Navy John Lehman
- Fmr. Secretary of the Interior Manuel Lujan, Jr.
- Fmr. Treasurer of the United States Rosario Marin
- Fmr. Ambassador to the Holy See Thomas Patrick Melady
- Fmr. Attorney General Michael Mukasey
- Fmr. chairman of the Republican National Committee, fmr. Ambassador to the Holy See, fmr. Secretary of Veterans Affairs Jim Nicholson
- Fmr. Secretary of State, fmr. National Security Advisor Condoleezza Rice
- Fmr. Mayor of Los Angeles Richard Riordan
- Fmr. Under Secretary of State for Arms Control and International Security Affairs John Rood
- Fmr. Ambassador to the Holy See Francis Rooney
- Fmr. Ambassador to Italy Peter F. Secchia
- Fmr. Ambassador to Italy, Ambassador to Australia Mel Sembler
- Fmr. Senior Advisor and Chief Spokesman for the Coalition Provisional Authority in Iraq Dan Senor
- Fmr. Ambassador to the Holy See Frank Shakespeare
- Fmr. Secretary of State, fmr. Secretary of the Treasury, fmr. Secretary of Labor George P. Shultz
- Fmr. Ambassador to Brazil, Ambassador to the Netherlands Clifford Sobel
- Fmr. Ambassador to France, Ambassador to the Czech Republic, Ambassador to Monaco Craig Roberts Stapleton
- Fmr. Deputy Attorney General George J. Terwilliger III
- Fmr. Ambassador to Hungary George Herbert Walker III
- Fmr. Ambassador to Slovakia Ronald Weiser
- Fmr. Ambassador to Canada David Wilkins
- Fmr. Assistant Secretary of State for International Organization Affairs Richard S. Williamson
- Fmr. Ambassador to Estonia Aldona Wos
- Fmr. Under Secretary of Defense (Comptroller) Dov Zakheim

== International political figures ==
- Daniel Hannan, British Conservative Party MEP for South East England
- Lech Wałęsa, former president of Poland (1990–1995)

== Miscellaneous ==
- George P. Bush
- Josefina Carbonell
- Sharon Day
- Cari M. Dominguez
- Callista Gingrich
- First Lady Supriya Jindal of Louisiana
- Fmr. First Lady Mary Pawlenty of Minnesota
- First Lady Anita Perry of Texas
- Karen Santorum
- First Lady Lucé Vela of Puerto Rico

== U.S. armed forces members ==
- Medal of Honor recipient, retired United States Army Sergeant John F. Baker, Jr.
- Retired United States Navy Captain, former astronaut, and last man to walk on the Moon, Eugene Cernan
- Retired United States Navy Captain and former astronaut Robert Crippen
- Retired General Tommy Franks
- Medal of Honor recipient, retired United States Marine Corps Captain John James McGinty, III
- Medal of Honor recipient, retired Colonel Ola L. Mize
- Medal of Honor recipient, retired Colonel Leo K. Thorsness
- Retired Lieutenant General Claudius E. Watts III

== Businesspeople ==
- Danny Ainge, president of basketball operations for the Boston Celtics
- Bill Bidwill, chairman of Arizona Cardinals
- Michael Bidwill, president of Arizona Cardinals
- George Bodenheimer, executive chairman of ESPN
- Donald Bren, businessman, philanthropist, and chairman of the Irvine Company
- Michael R. Burns, vice chairman of Lionsgate
- John Catsimatidis, owner, chairman, president and CEO of the Red Apple Group and Gristedes Foods and chairman and CEO of the United Refining Company
- Marjorie Dannenfelser, president of Susan B. Anthony List
- James L. Dolan, owner of the New York Knicks
- Mike Fernandez, founder of MBF Healthcare Partners
- Carly Fiorina, former CEO of Hewlett-Packard
- Rich Gotham, president of Boston Celtics
- Lee Iacocca, former CEO and president of Chrysler
- Woody Johnson, New York Jets owner
- Jerry Jones, owner of Dallas Cowboys
- Bobbie Kilberg, chief executive officer of the Northern Virginia Technology Council
- Kenneth Langone, co-founder of The Home Depot, former director of the New York Stock Exchange
- James B. Lee, Jr., vice chairman of JPMorgan Chase
- Randy Levine, president of New York Yankees
- Bernie Marcus, co-founder of Home Depot
- Linda McMahon, former business manager of WWE
- Scott McNealy, co-founder and CEO of Sun Microsystems
- Daryl Morey, general manager of Houston Rockets
- Rupert Murdoch, founder of News Corporation, Fox Broadcasting Company & HarperCollins
- Ross Perot, billionaire business magnate and former Independent and Reform party US presidential candidate
- Randy Rigby, president of Utah Jazz
- Pat Riley, president of Miami Heat
- John Schnatter, owner, founder, and CEO of Papa John's Pizza
- Charles R. Schwab, founder and chairman of the Charles Schwab Corporation
- Stephen A. Schwarzman, chairman of the Blackstone Group
- Harry E. Sloan, former Metro-Goldwyn-Mayer studio chief
- Daniel Snyder, owner of Washington Redskins
- Alex Spanos, owner of the San Diego Chargers
- Dean Spanos, chairman of the San Diego Chargers
- Mike Tannenbaum, general manager of New York Jets
- Donald Trump, chairman and president of The Trump Organization, future candidate and winner of the 2016 United States presidential election, future president of the United States
- Ivanka Trump, executive vice president of Development & Acquisitions at The Trump Organization
- Jim Walton, son of Sam Walton, a founder of Wal-Mart
- Meg Whitman, president and CEO of Hewlett-Packard, former chairman and CEO of eBay
- Lewis Wolff, co-owner of the Oakland Athletics and the San Jose Earthquakes

== Social and political activists ==
- Member of the board of directors and co-founder of GOProud, Christopher R. Barron
- Conservative activist, former RNC national committeeman, attorney James Bopp
- Chairman of the American Conservative Union, former RNC National Committeeman Al Cardenas
- Daughter of Fmr. Vice President Dick Cheney, LGBT rights activist Mary Cheney
- Hillary Clinton's former Senate state director, Gigi Georges
- Political activist, 2008 and 2010 Delaware United States Senate nominee Christine O'Donnell

== Clergy ==
- Evangelist Jerry Falwell, Jr.
- Evangelist Billy Graham (Democrat)
- Evangelist Franklin Graham
- Evangelist Wayne Grudem
- Televangelist Robert Jeffress
- Evangelist Richard Land
- Reverend Fred Luter, president of the Southern Baptist Convention
- Televangelist Pat Robertson

== Astronauts/NASA ==
- Eric C. Anderson
- Gene Cernan
- Scott Pace

== Organizations ==
- GOProud
- Log Cabin Republicans
- The Memphis Tea Party
- National Organization for Marriage
- National Rifle Association of America
- National Right to Life Committee
- Susan B. Anthony List

== Companies ==
- Miracle-Gro

== Entertainers and artists ==
=== Actors ===
- Scott Baio
- Stephen Baldwin
- Orson Bean
- Powers Boothe
- Gary Busey
- James Caan
- Dean Cain
- Kirk Cameron
- Candace Cameron Bure
- Vincent Curatola
- Stacey Dash
- Robert Davi
- Bo Derek
- Shannen Doherty
- Robert Duvall
- Clint Eastwood
- R. Lee Ermey
- Erik Estrada
- Andy Garcia
- Mel Gibson
- Kelsey Grammer
- Angie Harmon
- Melissa Joan Hart
- Patricia Heaton
- Jon Heder
- Julianne Hough
- Angus T. Jones
- Lorenzo Lamas
- Chuck Norris
- John O'Hurley
- John Ratzenberger
- Adam Sandler
- Tom Selleck
- Gary Sinise
- Tina Sloan
- Shawnee Smith
- Suzanne Somers
- Sylvester Stallone
- Jeremy Sumpter
- Janine Turner
- Vince Vaughn
- Jon Voight
- James Woods

=== Comedians ===
- Drew Carey
- Adam Carolla
- Terry Fator
- Jeff Foxworthy
- Victoria Jackson
- Dennis Miller
- Paul Rodriguez

=== Directors ===
- David Zucker

=== Models ===
- Melania Trump

=== Musicians ===
- Trace Adkins
- Ed Ames
- Rodney Atkins
- Jack Blades
- Pat Boone
- Neal E. Boyd
- Zac Brown
- Robert Burck
- Jonathan Cain
- Charlie Daniels
- Sara Evans
- David Foster
- Lee Greenwood
- Andy Griggs
- Taylor Hicks
- Vanilla Ice
- Bruce Johnston
- Big Kenny
- Mike Love
- Meat Loaf
- Jo Dee Messina
- Ronnie Milsap
- Sam Moore
- Dave Mustaine
- Wayne Newton
- Ted Nugent
- Jamie O'Neal
- John Ondrasik
- Donny Osmond
- Marie Osmond
- Randy Owen
- Tim "Ripper" Owens
- Collin Raye
- John Rich
- Kid Rock
- Neal Schon
- T.G. Sheppard
- Shyne
- Gene Simmons
- Ricky Skaggs
- Steve Smith
- Scott Stapp
- Cowboy Troy
- Lane Turner
- Ross Valory
- Hank Williams, Jr.
- Gretchen Wilson

==== Bands ====
- Lynyrd Skynyrd
- The Marshall Tucker Band
- The Oak Ridge Boys

=== Adult entertainers ===
- Jenna Jameson
- Michael Lucas

=== Producers ===
- Jerry Bruckheimer
- Lionel Chetwynd
- Rob Long
- Gerald R. Molen
- Burt Sugarman
- Joel Surnow

=== Screenwriters ===
- Joe Eszterhas
- Andrew Klavan
- David Mamet

=== Television and radio personalities ===
- Glenn Beck
- Mr. Burns (non-canon)
- Rachel Campos-Duffy
- Sean Hannity
- Elisabeth Hasselbeck
- Robert Kagan
- Robin Leach
- Rush Limbaugh
- Heidi Montag
- Piers Morgan
- Bill O'Reilly
- Wayne Allen Root
- Mike Rowe
- Michael Savage
- Cal Thomas
- Chuck Woolery

=== Writers ===
- Scott Adams
- H.G. Bissinger
- Ann Coulter
- Niall Ferguson
- Terry Goodkind
- Dean Koontz
- Brad Thor

== Athletes ==
=== Baseball (MLB) ===
- J. P. Arencibia
- Jeremy Guthrie
- Todd Helton
- Dale Murphy
- Alex Rodriguez

=== Basketball (NBA) ===
- Greg Anthony
- Bob Cousy
- Chris Dudley
- Spencer Hawes

=== Bobsled ===
- Jean Racine-Prahm
- Bill Schuffenhauer

=== Football (NFL) ===
- John Beck
- Jay Cutler
- John Elway
- Jay Feely
- Todd Heap
- Brent Jones
- Nick Mangold
- Peyton Manning
- Burgess Owens
- Bart Starr
- Tom Waddle
- Wes Welker

=== Golf ===
- Rickie Fowler
- Jack Nicklaus

=== Ice skating/hockey ===
- Michael Eruzione
- Andy Gabel
- Dorothy Hamill
- Scott Hamilton
- Dan Jansen
- Bobby Orr
- Derek Parra
- Jeremy Roenick
- Kristi Yamaguchi

=== Skeet shooting ===
- Kim Rhode

=== Skeleton racing ===
- Lea Ann Parsley
- Noelle Pikus-Pace
- Jimmy Shea

=== Skiing ===
- Christopher Devlin-Young

=== Swimming ===
- Rowdy Gaines

=== Tennis ===
- Jim Courier

=== Auto racing (NASCAR) ===
- Richard Childress
- Brian France
- Mike Helton
- Rick Hendrick
- Richard Petty
- Bruton Smith

=== Professional wrestling ===
- Hulk Hogan
- Vince McMahon

== Economics Nobel Prize laureates ==
- Gary Becker
- James Buchanan
- Eugene Fama
- Robert Lucas, Jr.
- Robert Mundell
- Edward C. Prescott
- Myron Scholes

== See also ==
- Endorsements for the Republican Party presidential primaries, 2012
- List of Barack Obama presidential campaign endorsements, 2012
- List of Ron Paul 2012 presidential campaign endorsements
- Mitt Romney presidential campaign, 2012
