= Barack Obama presidential campaign endorsements =

Barack Obama presidential campaign endorsements may refer to:

- List of Barack Obama presidential campaign endorsements, 2008
- List of Barack Obama presidential campaign endorsements, 2012
