= Jim Wheeler =

American politician from Nevada

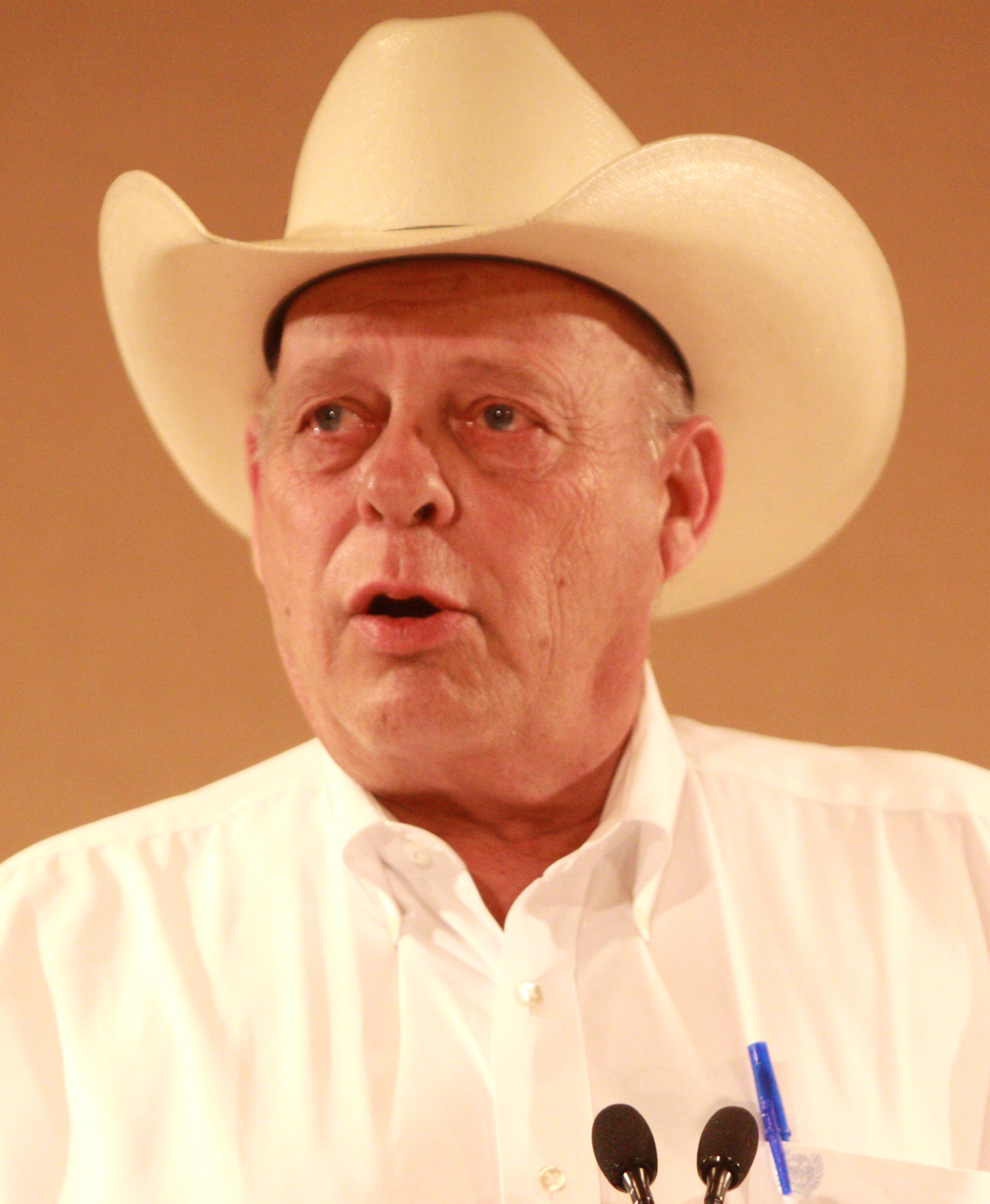

Minority Leader of the Nevada Assembly
- In office February 6, 2017 – June 4, 2019
- Preceded by: Irene Bustamante Adams
- Succeeded by: Robin Titus

Member of the Nevada Assembly from the 39th district
- In office November 7, 2012 – November 9, 2022
- Preceded by: Kelly Kite
- Succeeded by: Ken Gray

Personal details
- Born: Floyd James Wheeler; November 8, 1953 (age 72) Los Angeles, California, U.S.
- Party: Republican
- Children: 3

Military service
- Allegiance: United States
- Branch/service: United States Air Force
- Years of service: 1975–1977

Floyd James Wheeler (born November 8, 1953) is an American businessman and politician from the state of Nevada. A member of the Republican Party, Wheeler served in the Nevada Assembly, representing the 39th district.

== Early career ==
Wheeler was the chief executive officer of Powerdyne Automotive Products.

== Nevada Assembly ==
Wheeler first ran for the Nevada Assembly in 2010, seeking to replace James Settelmeyer, who was not running for reelection. However, Kelly Kite won the election.

Wheeler was first elected in 2012, defeating Kelly Kite.

=== Tenure ===
Assembly Bill 86 was a bill that would have reduced the minimum age to gamble from 21 to 18. Wheeler supported the bill. However, the bill died in the senate.

=== Minority leader (2017 - 2019) ===
Wheeler served as a minority leader from 2017 until his resignation in 2019. He was replaced by assemblywoman Robin L. Titus. Wheeler won re-election back to the 39th district.

== Criticism ==
In September 2013, Kelly Kite, a former Assembly member who was defeated by Wheeler in the 2012 election, filed an ethics complaint against Wheeler, stating that he did not live in the 39th district. Kite later filed another complaint against Wheeler in September 2013 for failing to disclose a lien.

In October 2013 the state Democratic Party on Monday released a YouTube video filmed in August in which Wheeler told constituents that he would vote to reinstitute slavery if his constituents wanted him to. On October 29, Wheeler apologized, saying, "If my comments were taken with offense by anyone, I sincerely apologize. I intended the statement as an extreme example of something unacceptable, and hope that’s how it’s taken."

Nevada Assembly
Preceded by Kelly Kite	Member of the Nevada Assembly from the 39th district 2012-2022	Succeeded by Ken Gray
Political offices
Preceded by Irene Bustamante Adams	Minority Leader of the Nevada Assembly; 2017–2019	Succeeded by Robin Titus
