= P. K. O'Neill =

American politician

Minority Leader of the Nevada Assembly
- In office February 6, 2023 – February 3, 2025
- Preceded by: Robin Titus
- Succeeded by: Gregory Hafen II

Member of the Nevada Assembly from the 40th district
- Incumbent
- Assumed office November 4, 2020
- Preceded by: Al Kramer
- In office November 5, 2014 – November 9, 2016
- Preceded by: Pete Livermore
- Succeeded by: Al Kramer

Personal details
- Born: 1951 (age 74–75) Washington, D.C., U.S.
- Party: Republican
- Spouse: Nancy O'Neill
- Children: 4
- Education: Sierra Nevada University (BS)

Philip K. O'Neill (born 1951) is an American politician. He served as a Republican member of the Nevada Assembly from 2014 until 2016 and is currently serving in the assembly since 2020.

== Early life ==
Philip O'Neill was born in 1951 in Washington, D.C. He was educated at the Georgetown Preparatory School in Bethesda, Maryland. He graduated from Sierra Nevada College, where he received a Bachelor of Science in business management.

== Career ==
O'Neill worked in law enforcement for four decades prior to running for office. He served as a Republican member of the Nevada Assembly, where he represented District 40. He is a member of the National Rifle Association of America (NRA).

In 2016, O'Neill ran for reelection but was narrowly defeated by Al Kramer in the Republican primary.

== Personal life ==
O'Neill has a wife, Nancy, and four children. They reside in Carson City, Nevada.

Nevada Assembly
Preceded by Robin Titus	Minority Leader of the Nevada Assembly; 2023–2025	Succeeded by Gregory Hafen II
