= Ken Gray (politician) =

American politician from Nevada

Member of the Nevada Assembly from the 39th district
- In office November 9, 2022 – August 24, 2025
- Preceded by: Jim Wheeler
- Succeeded by: Blayne Osborn

Personal details
- Born: Long Beach, California, U.S.
- Party: Republican
- Education: Air University (AS); Excelsior University (BS)

Ken Gray is an American politician, government administrator, and U.S. Air Force veteran who served in the Nevada Assembly, representing the 39th district from 2022 to 2025. A member of the Republican Party, Gray resides in Dayton, Nevada.

Gray resigned from the Nevada Assembly in August 2025 after being appointed to a position in the United States Department of Veterans Affairs.
