= Robin L. Titus =

American politician

Robin Titus

Minority Leader of the Nevada Senate
- Incumbent
- Assumed office January 17, 2024
- Preceded by: Heidi Gansert

Member of the Nevada Senate from the 17th district
- Incumbent
- Assumed office November 9, 2022
- Preceded by: James Settelmeyer

Minority Leader of the Nevada Assembly
- In office June 4, 2019 – November 9, 2022
- Preceded by: Jim Wheeler
- Succeeded by: P. K. O'Neill

Member of the Nevada Assembly from the 38th district
- In office November 5, 2014 – November 9, 2022
- Preceded by: Thomas Grady
- Succeeded by: Gregory Koenig

Personal details
- Born: February 21, 1954 (age 72) Trenton, New Jersey, U.S.
- Party: Republican
- Spouse: Allen Veil
- Children: 2
- Education: University of Nevada, Reno (BS, MD)

Robin L. Titus (born February 21, 1954) is an American physician and politician. She serves as a Republican member of the Nevada Senate representing the 17th district. She previously served in the Nevada Assembly.

== Early life ==
Titus was born in Trenton, New Jersey. She was educated at the Smith Valley High School, graduating in 1972. She graduated from the University of Nevada, Reno, where she received a bachelor of science in 1976, and she became a Doctor of Medicine (MD) from the University of Nevada School of Medicine in Reno, Nevada in 1981.

== Career ==
Titus is a physician in Lyon County, Nevada. In 1989, she had an office in Wellington and another one in Yerington. She stopped delivering babies when the insurance premiums were raised and she could no longer afford them. However, by 2014, she still maintained a medical practice in Wellington.

Titus served as a Republican member of the Nevada Assembly, where she represents District 38. She is the president of the Smith Valley Historical Society.

Titus was elected to the Nevada Senate in 2022 and was subsequently elected Senate Minority Leader in January 2024.

== Personal life ==
Titus is married to Allen Veil, who previously served as the sheriff of Lyon County. She has two children. They reside in Wellington, Nevada.

Nevada Assembly
Preceded by Jim Wheeler	Minority Leader of the Nevada Assembly; 2019–2022	Succeeded by P. K. O'Neill
Nevada Senate
Preceded by Heidi Gansert	Minority Leader of the Nevada Senate; 2024–present	Incumbent
