= Thomas Grady (politician) =

American politician

Member of the Nevada Assembly from the 38th district
- In office February 4, 2003 – November 5, 2014
- Preceded by: Joe Dini
- Succeeded by: Robin L. Titus

Personal details
- Born: October 6, 1939 (age 86) Tonopah, Nevada
- Party: Republican
- Education: University of Nevada, Reno; Washington State University

Thomas J. Grady (born October 6, 1939, in Tonopah, Nevada) is an American politician and a Republican former member of the Nevada Assembly, serving from 2003 until 2014.

== Education ==
Grady attended the University of Nevada, Reno and Washington State University.

== Elections ==
- 2012 Grady was unopposed for both the June 12, 2012 Republican Primary and the November 6, 2012 General election, winning with 21,545 votes.
- 2002 When Democratic Assemblyman and former Speaker Joe Dini retired and left the District 38 seat open, Grady won the four-way September 3, 2002 Republican Primary with 2,349 votes (46.71%), and won the three-way November 5, 2002 General election with 8,210 votes (49.64%) against Democratic nominee George Dini and Independent American candidate Dennis Gomez.
- 2004 Grady was unopposed for the September 7, 2004 Republican Primary and won the three-way November 2, 2004 General election with 14,336 votes (60.05%) against Democratic nominee Cathylee James and Independent American candidate Dennis Gomez.
- 2006 Grady and James were both unopposed for their August 15, 2006 primaries, setting up a rematch; Grady won the November 7, 2006 General election with 12,899 votes (61.85%) against James.
- 2008 Grady was unopposed for the August 12, 2008 Republican Primary and won the three-way November 4, 2008 General election with 16,782 votes (60.52%) against Democratic nominee Steven Dalton and a third contest with Independent American candidate Dennis Gomez.
- 2010 Grady won the June 8, 2010 Republican Primary with 5,948 votes (71.25%), and won the three-way November 2, 2010 General election with 17,282 votes (75.09%) in a direct contest with Independent American candidate Dennis Gomez.
