= Al Kramer =

American politician

Member of the Nevada Assembly from the 40th district
- In office November 9, 2016 – November 4, 2020
- Preceded by: P. K. O'Neill
- Succeeded by: P. K. O'Neill

Treasurer of Carson City
- In office January 1995 – January 2015
- Succeeded by: Gayle Robertson

Personal details
- Born: 1948 (age 77–78) Reno, Nevada, US
- Party: Republican
- Education: Brigham Young University; Claremont Graduate University

Military service
- Allegiance: United States
- Branch/service: United States Army
- Years of service: 1971–1975

Al Kramer (born 1948) is a former Republican member of the Nevada Assembly. He represented the 40th district, which covers Carson City and parts of southern Washoe County.

== Biography ==
Kramer was born in 1948 in Reno, Nevada. He graduated with a Bachelor of Science from Brigham Young University and with a Master of Business Administration from Claremont Graduate School. Kramer served in the United States Army from 1971 until 1975 where he rose to the rank of captain. He was elected Treasurer of Carson City from 1995 until 2015.

In January 2016, Kramer declared his intent to challenge incumbent Assemblyman P. K. O'Neill for the Republican nomination for the Assembly. He narrowly defeated O'Neill in a four-way Republican primary, and won a three-way general election with nearly 60% of the vote. He was reelected to a second term in 2018, but decided at the last minute not to seek reelection in 2020, citing health and family issues.

== Personal life ==
Kramer and his wife, Candice, have three children: Daniel, Alex, and Joy.

== Electoral history ==
Nevada Assembly District 40 Republican primary, 2016
Party	Candidate	Votes	%
Republican	Al Kramer	1,709	29.4%
Republican	P. K. O'Neill	1,548	26.6%
Republican	Sam England	1,515	26.0%
Republican	Chris Forbush	1,050	18.0%
Total votes		5,822	100.0%

Nevada Assembly District 40 election, 2016
Party	Candidate	Votes	%
Republican	Al Kramer	17,864	59.5%
Democratic	Michael L. Greedy	9,981	33.3%
Independent American	John Wagner	2,173	7.2%
Total votes		30,018	100.0%
