= Tom Scott (West Virginia politician) =

American politician (1932–2024)

Thomas (Tom) Francis Scott (August 4, 1932 – July 24, 2024) was an American politician. He was a physician. He served as a Republican member of the West Virginia State Senate from 1994 to 1998.

== See also ==
- List of Mitt Romney 2012 presidential campaign endorsements
