= Bonnie Parnell =

American politician (born 1946)

Member of the Nevada Assembly
- In office November 2004 – November 2010
- Succeeded by: Pete Livermore
- Constituency: District 40
- In office November 1998 – November 2002

Personal details
- Born: June 22, 1946 (age 80) Bakersfield, California
- Party: Democratic
- Education: Long Beach State University

Bonnie Parnell (born June 22, 1946) is an American politician. She served in the Nevada Assembly.

Parnell endorsed the Pete Buttigieg 2020 presidential campaign.
