= Randy Rigby =

Randy Rigby is a retired professional basketball executive, currently serving as an advisor for the Utah Jazz in the National Basketball Association (NBA) since 2016. He began his distinguished career with the Utah Jazz in 1986, and served as president of basketball operations between 2007 and 2016.

== Biography ==
As Jazz Team President, Rigby was a member of the NBA Academy Advisory Committee.

On February 17, 2016, Rigby announced his decision to retire as the Utah Jazz Team President, and he was succeeded in the role by Steve Starks.

Rigby previously was Senior Vice President of Sales, Broadcasting, and Chief Marketing Officer for Miller Sports + Entertainment. He was also General Manager of KJZZ-TV. Rigby became president of the Utah Jazz after working as the Senior Vice President for three years at CFS Financial Corporation.

Rigby is from the 1979 graduating class at Brigham Young University (BYU), where he earned a degree in Business Management with a specialization in Finance and Marketing.

He played a role in the team's acquisition of an NBA D-League team in Idaho and even helped revive summer league basketball in Salt Lake City.

== Personal life ==
Randy Rigby is married, and he and his wife have five children. The couple resides in Farmington, Utah, and are members of the Church of Jesus Christ of Latter-day Saints.
