= Pete Livermore =

American politician (1941–2014)

Member of the Nevada Assembly from the 40th district
- In office November 3, 2010 – October 20, 2014
- Preceded by: Bonnie Parnell
- Succeeded by: P. K. O'Neill

Personal details
- Born: March 22, 1941 New Orleans, Louisiana, U.S.
- Died: October 20, 2014 (aged 73) Carson City, Nevada, U.S.
- Party: Republican
- Spouse: Laurie Livermore
- Children: 3
- Education: L. E. Rabouin High School
- Website: pete4assembly.com

Military service
- Allegiance: United States
- Branch/service: United States Marine Corps
- Years of service: 1958–1962

Peter L. Livermore (March 22, 1941 – October 20, 2014) was an American politician who served as a member of the Nevada Assembly as a Republican from 2010 to 2014, representing District 40.

== Early life ==
Livermore was born in New Orleans, Louisiana on March 22, 1941. He earned a diploma from L. E. Rabouin High School.

Livermore served in the United States Marine Corps from 1958 to 1962.

== Political career ==
Livermore served as Mayor Pro Tempore of Carson City, Nevada from 2004 to 2006. Additionally, he served on the Carson City Board of Supervisors from 1998 to 2010.

In 2010, when Democratic Assemblywoman Bonnie Parnell retired and left the District 40 seat open, Livermore won the three-way June 8, 2010 Republican primary with 50% of the vote. He then won the November 2, 2010 general election with 51% of the vote, defeating Democratic nominee Robin Williamson.

In 2012, Livermore won the June 12 Republican primary with over 72% of the vote. He then won the November 6, 2012 general election with over 57% of the vote, defeating Democratic nominee Rich Dunn.

== Personal life and death ==
Livermore resided in Carson City, Nevada. He had a wife and three children.

On October 20, 2014, Livermore died of a heart attack at the age of 73.
