= Peter Johnson (Maine politician) =

American politician

Peter B. Johnson

Member of the Maine House of Representatives for the 27th District (Greenville)
- In office December 2006 – December 2014
- Succeeded by: Andrew McLean

Personal details
- Party: Republican
- Education: University of Maine

Peter B. Johnson is an American politician from Maine, USA. A Republican, Johnson served in the Maine House of Representatives from 2006 and was unable to seek re-election in 2014 due to term limits. He served in the Maine Air National Guard.
