= Tom Massey (American politician) =

American politician

Member of the Colorado House of Representatives from the 60th district
- In office 2005–2013

Personal details
- Party: Republican

Tom Massey is an American Republican politician who represented District 60 in the Colorado House of Representatives from 2005 to 2013.

He later worked in healthcare policy.
