= List of Barack Obama 2012 presidential campaign endorsements =

Many notable people and groups formally endorsed or voiced support for President Barack Obama's 2012 presidential re-election campaign during the Democratic Party primaries and the general election.

== U.S. presidents and vice presidents ==
- President Jimmy Carter
- President Bill Clinton

== U.S. senators ==
=== Current ===
- Sen. Michael Bennet (D-CO)
- Sen. Majority Whip Dick Durbin (D-IL)
- Sen. Amy Klobuchar (D-MN)
- Sen. Bernie Sanders (I-VT)
- Sen. Chuck Schumer (D-NY), chairman of the Senate Rules Committee
- Sen. Jeanne Shaheen (D-NH)
- Sen. Mark Warner (D-VA)

=== Former ===
- Sen. Evan Bayh (D-IN), Fmr. Governor of Indiana
- Sen. Barbara Boxer (D-CA), former Chairwoman of the Senate Committee on Environment and Public Works and chairwoman of the Senate Select Committee on Ethics
- Sen. Bob Casey (D-PA)
- Sen. Jon Corzine (D-NJ), Fmr. Governor of New Jersey
- Sen. Russ Feingold (D-WI)
- Sen. Al Franken (D-MN)
- Sen. Bob Graham (D-FL), Fmr. Governor of Florida
- Sen. John Kerry (D-MA)
- Sen. Patrick Leahy (D-VT)
- Sen. Claire McCaskill (D-MO)
- Sen. George Mitchell (D-ME)
- Sen. Larry Pressler (R-SD)
- former Sen. Majority Leader Harry Reid (D-NV)
- Sen. Jim Webb (D-VA)

== U.S. representatives ==
=== Current ===
- Rep. Jason Altmire (D-PA)
- Rep. Joe Baca (D-CA)
- Rep. Karen Bass (D-CA)
- Rep. Xavier Becerra (D-CA)
- Rep. Bob Brady (D-PA)
- Rep. Corrine Brown (D-FL)
- Rep. Lois Capps (D-CA)
- Rep. Dennis Cardoza (D-CA)
- Rep. Judy Chu (D-CA)
- Rep. Emanuel Cleaver (D-MO)
- Rep. Steve Cohen (D-TN)
- Rep. Jim Costa (D-CA)
- Rep. Joe Courtney (D-CT)
- Rep. Mark Critz (D-PA)
- Rep. Danny K. Davis (D-IL)
- Rep. Rosa DeLauro (D-CT)
- Rep. Mike Doyle (D-PA)
- Rep. Keith Ellison (D-MN)
- Rep. Anna Eshoo (D-CA)
- Rep. Charles A. Gonzalez (D-TX)
- Rep. Sam Farr (D-CA)
- Rep. Chaka Fattah (D-PA)
- Rep. Jim Himes (D-CT)
- Rep. Mike Honda (D-CA)
- Rep. Jesse Jackson Jr. (D-IL)
- Rep. John B. Larson (D-CT)
- Rep. Barbara Lee (D-CA)
- Rep. Zoe Lofgren (D-CA)
- Rep. Doris Matsui (D-CA)
- Rep. Jerry McNerney (D-CA)
- Rep. Grace Napolitano (D-CA)
- Rep. Laura Richardson (D-CA)
- Rep. Lucille Roybal-Allard (D-CA)
- Rep. Linda Sánchez (D-CA)
- Rep. Jan Schakowsky (D-IL)
- Rep. Adam Schiff (D-CA)
- Rep. Debbie Wasserman Schultz (D-FL), Chairwoman of the Democratic National Committee
- Rep. Allyson Schwartz (D-PA)
- Rep. Terri Sewell (D-AL)
- Rep. Jackie Speier (D-CA)
- Rep. Pete Stark (D-CA)
- Rep. Mike Thompson (D-CA)
- Rep. Maxine Waters (D-CA)

=== Former ===
- Rep. Rahm Emanuel (D-IL), Mayor of Chicago, fmr. White House Chief of Staff in the Obama administration
- Rep. Harris W. Fawell (R-IL)
- Rep. Harold Ford Jr. (D-TN)
- Rep. Gabby Giffords (D-AZ)
- Rep. Patrick Murphy (D-PA)

== Governors ==
=== Current ===
- Gov. Neil Abercrombie (D-HI)
- Gov. Steve Beshear (D-KY)
- Gov. Jerry Brown (D-CA)
- Gov. Lincoln Chafee (I-RI), former U.S. senator (R-RI)
- Gov. Andrew Cuomo (D-NY)
- Gov. Mark Dayton (D-MN)
- Gov. Chris Gregoire (D-WA)
- Gov. John Hickenlooper (D-CO)
- Gov. John Kitzhaber (D-OR)
- Gov. John Lynch (D-NH)
- Gov. Dan Malloy (D-CT)
- Gov. Martin O'Malley (D-MD)
- Gov. Jack Markell (D-DE)
- Gov. Deval Patrick (D-MA)
- Gov. Beverly Perdue (D-NC)
- Gov. Pat Quinn (D-IL)
- Gov. Brian Schweitzer (D-MT)
- Gov. Peter Shumlin (D-VT)

=== Former ===
- Gov. and Sen. Evan Bayh (D-IN)
- Gov. Phil Bredesen (D-TN)
- Gov. Charlie Crist (I-FL); Republican while in office
- Gov. Howard Dean (D-VT); Fmr. Chairman of the DNC and 2004 presidential candidate
- Gov. and Sen. Bob Graham (D-FL), 2004 presidential candidate
- Gov. Jim Hunt (D-NC)
- Gov. and Lt. Gov. Tim Kaine (D-VA)
- Gov. Angus King (I-ME)

== National political figures and former cabinet officials ==
- Nicole Avant, former United States Ambassador to the Bahamas
- Jeff Bleich, former United States Ambassador to Australia
- Richard A. Clarke, former National Coordinator for Security, Infrastructure Protection, and Counter-terrorism for the United States
- Charles Fried former Solicitor General under Ronald Reagan
- Steven J. Green, former United States Ambassador to Singapore, former CEO and Chairman of Samsonite Corporation
- Douglas Kmiec, former United States Ambassador to Malta, legal aide to former president Reagan
- Candace Gingrich, half-sister of Republican 2012 presidential candidate Newt Gingrich
- Colin Powell, former United States Secretary of State, Chairman of the Joint Chiefs of Staff, National Security Advisor, four-star General (Republican) (deceased)
- Norman Mineta, former United States Secretary of Transportation, United States Secretary of Commerce

== Military ==
- Wesley Clark, four star General (Ret), former Supreme Allied Commander Europe of NATO, 2004 presidential candidate
- Richard Danzig, former Secretary of the Navy
- Paul Eaton, Major General (Ret)
- Donald J. Guter, retired U.S. Navy Rear Admiral, former Judge Advocate General of the Navy, current dean, South Texas College of Law
- Michael D. Lumpkin
- John B. Nathman, retired U.S. Navy Admiral, co-chair of the re-election campaign of President Obama

== Mayors ==
- William D. Euille, former Mayor of Alexandria, Virginia
- Kasim Reed, former Mayor of Atlanta
- Stephanie Rawlings-Blake, former Mayor of Baltimore
- Thomas Menino, former Mayor of Boston
- Anthony Foxx, former Mayor of Charlotte, North Carolina
- Rahm Emanuel, former Mayor of Chicago; former U.S. Representative, and former White House Chief of Staff
- Richard M. Daley, former mayor of Chicago
- Michael Hancock, former Mayor of Denver
- Dave Bing, former Mayor of Detroit
- Craig Lowe, former Mayor of Gainesville, Florida
- Annise Parker, former Mayor of Houston
- Alvin Brown, former Mayor of Jacksonville, Florida
- Antonio Villaraigosa, former Mayor of Los Angeles
- R. T. Rybak, former Mayor of Minneapolis
- John DeStefano Jr., former Mayor of New Haven, Connecticut
- Mitch Landrieu, former Mayor of New Orleans
- David Dinkins, former mayor of New York City
- Ed Koch, former mayor of New York City
- Michael Bloomberg, former Mayor of New York City
- Cory Booker, former Mayor of Newark, New Jersey
- Buddy Dyer, Mayor of Orlando, Florida
- Michael Nutter, former Mayor of Philadelphia
- Julian Castro, former Mayor of San Antonio
- Willie Brown, former mayor of San Francisco
- Bob Buckhorn, former Mayor of Tampa, Florida

== State, local, and territory officials ==
- former Lt. Gov. Joseph Garcia (D-CO)
- former Lt. Gov. Anthony Brown (D-MD)
- former Atty Gen. Kamala Harris (D-CA)
- former State Rep. Mark Meadows (D-MI)
- former State Rep. Heather Mizeur (D-MD)
- former Lt. Gov. Gavin Newsom (D-CA)
- former State Assemblywoman Teresa Sayward (R-NY)
- former. Ohio First Lady Frances Strickland
- Steve Westly, former California State Controller (D-CA)

== Native American leaders ==
- Bill John Baker, Principal Chief of the Cherokee Nation of Oklahoma (D-OK)

== International political figures ==
- British Labour Party MP Diane Abbott, 2010 candidate for the Labour Party leadership and first black female MP.
- Former president of France Nicolas Sarkozy

== Publications ==
See: Newspaper endorsements in the 2012 United States presidential election

== Business people ==
- Marc Benioff, Chairman and CEO of salesforce.com
- Jeffrey Brotman, Founder of Costco
- Warren Buffett, CEO of Berkshire Hathaway
- Ari Emanuel, CEO of William Morris Endeavor Entertainment
- Nathaniel Fick, CEO of the Center for a New American Security, author of One Bullet Away, a New York Times best seller
- Bill Gates, Microsoft founder and CEO
- David Geffen, founder of Asylum Records, Geffen Records, and DGC Records; cofounder of DreamWorks SKG
- Berry Gordy, founder of the Motown record label
- Gary Hirshberg, Chairman, President, and CEO of Stonyfield Farm
- Chris Hughes, co-founder of Facebook
- James Lassiter
- Kevin Liles, former executive Vice President of Warner Music Group
- Michael Lynton, Chairman and CEO of Sony Pictures Entertainment
- Jeffrey Katzenberg, CEO of DreamWorks Animation
- Marissa Mayer, CEO of Yahoo!
- Mike Medavoy, Chairman and CEO of Phoenix Pictures
- Tom Rothman, Chairman and CEO of Fox Filmed Entertainment
- Sheryl Sandberg, COO of Facebook
- Eric Schmidt, former CEO of Google
- Russell Simmons, co-founder of Def Jam
- James Sinegal, founder and former CEO of Costco
- George Soros, founder of Soros Fund Management

== Chefs ==
- Daniel Boulud
- Anthony Bourdain
- Bobby Flay
- Wolfgang Puck
- Gordon Ramsay
- Marcus Samuelsson

== Fashion designers ==
- Tory Burch
- Georgina Chapman
- Keren Craig
- Tom Ford
- Prabal Gurung
- Tommy Hilfiger
- Derek Lam
- Tina Knowles
- Michael Kors
- Thakoon Panichgul
- Tracy Reese
- Narciso Rodriguez
- Rachel Roy
- Alexander Wang
- Vera Wang
- Jason Wu

== Labor unions ==
- AFL–CIO
- AFSCME
- American Federation of Teachers
- American Nurses Association
- Communications Workers of America
- International Association of Fire Fighters
- International Union of Bricklayers and Allied Craftworkers
- National Education Association
- SEIU

== Social and political activists ==
- Gloria Allred
- Mariela Castro
- Sandra Fluke
- Jesse Jackson
- Lilly Ledbetter
- Susan Saint James
- Jimmy McMillan
- Al Sharpton
- Gloria Steinem
- Zach Wahls
- Sam Webb

== Organizations ==
- Clean Water Action
- Environment America
- Gay-Straight Alliance
- Human Rights Campaign
- League of Conservation Voters
- National Organization for Women
- National Stonewall Democrats
- Planned Parenthood
- Sierra Club
- The Advocate

== Entertainment ==
=== Actors and actresses ===
- Ben Affleck
- Dianna Agron
- Paul Adelstein
- Jessica Alba
- Jason Alexander
- Richard Dean Anderson
- David Arquette
- Patricia Arquette
- Scott Bakula
- Alec Baldwin
- Antonio Banderas
- Elizabeth Banks
- John Barrowman
- Drew Barrymore
- Justin Bartha
- Angela Bassett
- Troian Bellisario
- Maria Bello
- Jim Belushi
- Jon Bernthal
- Wilson Bethel
- Jack Black
- Michael Ian Black
- Alexis Bledel
- Zach Braff
- Jeff Bridges
- Connie Britton
- Matthew Broderick
- James Brolin
- Sophia Bush
- Nick Cannon
- Kate Capshaw
- Don Cheadle
- Kristin Chenoweth
- John Cho
- George Clooney
- Rachael Leigh Cook
- Kevin Costner
- Daniel Craig
- Bryan Cranston
- Russell Crowe
- Alan Cumming
- Tim Daly
- Tyne Daly
- Matt Damon
- Larry David
- Rosario Dawson
- Jonathan Del Arco
- Kat Dennings
- Robert De Niro
- Portia de Rossi
- Zooey Deschanel
- Danny DeVito
- Cameron Diaz
- Leonardo DiCaprio
- Tate Donovan
- Kirk Douglas
- Michael Douglas
- Robert Downey Jr.
- Fran Drescher
- Julia Louis-Dreyfus
- Lena Dunham
- Eliza Dushku
- Anthony Edwards
- Lisa Edelstein
- Jesse Eisenberg
- Tracee Ellis Ross
- Omar Epps
- Giancarlo Esposito
- Chris Evans
- Donald Faison
- Edie Falco
- Mia Farrow
- Jesse Tyler Ferguson
- America Ferrera
- Will Ferrell
- Laurence Fishburne
- Bridget Fonda
- Vivica A. Fox
- Jamie Foxx
- Morgan Freeman
- Johnny Galecki
- Jennifer Garner
- Gina Gershon
- Whoopi Goldberg
- Jonathan Goldsmith
- Selena Gomez
- Topher Grace
- Clark Gregg
- Adrian Grenier
- Melanie Griffith
- Ronald Guttman
- Luis Guzmán
- Mark Hamill
- Jon Hamm
- Tom Hanks
- Mariska Hargitay
- Hill Harper
- Neil Patrick Harris
- Anne Hathaway
- Salma Hayek
- Colton Haynes
- Dennis Haysbert
- Ed Helms
- Taraji P. Henson
- Jamie Hector
- Terrence Howard
- Cheyenne Jackson
- Samuel L. Jackson
- Ken Jeong
- Scarlett Johansson
- Don Johnson
- Dwayne Johnson
- Angelina Jolie
- James Earl Jones
- Rashida Jones
- Ashley Judd
- Michael Keaton
- Stacy Keibler
- Minka Kelly
- Anna Kendrick
- Wayne Knight
- Mila Kunis
- Ashton Kutcher
- Padma Lakshmi
- Nathan Lane
- Angela Lansbury
- Sanaa Lathan
- John Leguizamo
- John Lithgow
- Judith Light
- Lindsay Lohan
- Justin Long
- Nia Long
- Eva Longoria
- Jane Lynch
- Tobey Maguire
- Wendie Malick
- Stephanie March
- Julianna Margulies
- Marsha Mason
- Eric McCormack
- Audra McDonald
- Benjamin McKenzie
- Christa Miller
- Demi Moore
- Julianne Moore
- Mandy Moore
- Jennifer Morrison
- Olivia Munn
- Lucas Neff
- Cynthia Nixon
- Edward Norton
- Gwyneth Paltrow
- Al Pacino
- Hayden Panettiere
- Sarah Jessica Parker
- Kal Penn
- Sean Penn
- Bernadette Peters
- Clarke Peters
- Rhea Perlman
- Mekhi Phifer
- Wendell Pierce
- Brad Pitt
- Martha Plimpton
- Amy Poehler
- Natalie Portman
- Chris Pratt
- Maggie Q
- Zachary Quinto
- Daniel Radcliffe
- Josh Radnor
- Sheryl Lee Ralph
- Robert Redford
- Salli Richardson
- Amber Riley
- Lisa Rinna
- Julia Roberts
- Adam Rodríguez
- Seth Rogen
- Brandon Routh
- Paul Rudd
- Mark Ruffalo
- Kyra Sedgwick
- Tony Shalhoub
- Molly Shannon
- Martin Sheen
- Sherri Shepherd
- Jada Pinkett Smith
- Will Smith
- Sonja Sohn
- Ian Somerhalder
- Sissy Spacek
- Kevin Spacey
- Octavia Spencer
- Ben Stiller
- Sharon Stone
- Meryl Streep
- Yvonne Strahovski
- Brenda Strong
- Jason Sudeikis
- Kiefer Sutherland
- George Takei
- Holland Taylor
- Marlo Thomas
- Aisha Tyler
- Gabrielle Union
- Amber Valletta
- Mark Wahlberg
- Christopher Walken
- Kate Walsh
- Denzel Washington
- Kerry Washington
- Sam Waterston
- Marlon Wayans
- Jennifer Westfeldt
- Betty White
- Olivia Wilde
- Wayne Wilderson
- Vanessa L. Williams
- Rita Wilson
- Reese Witherspoon
- Alfre Woodard
- Joanne Woodward

=== Comedians ===
- Aziz Ansari
- Bill Cosby
- Margaret Cho
- David Cross
- Billy Crystal
- Jimmy Fallon
- Zach Galifianakis
- Ricky Gervais
- Chelsea Handler
- Kevin Hart
- Steve Harvey
- John Hodgman
- George Lopez
- Eddie Murphy
- Patton Oswalt
- Carl Reiner
- Chris Rock
- Jeffrey Ross
- Rickey Smiley
- Yeardley Smith
- Sinbad
- Wanda Sykes
- Paul F. Tompkins

=== Directors ===
- J. J. Abrams
- Darren Aronofsky
- Judd Apatow
- Peter Berg
- Cameron Crowe
- Jesse Dylan
- David Fincher
- Ron Howard
- Spike Lee
- David Lynch
- Adam McKay
- Bennett Miller
- Rob Minkoff
- Michael Moore
- Tyler Perry
- Rob Reiner
- John Sayles
- Kevin Smith
- Steven Spielberg
- Oliver Stone
- Marc Webb
- Joss Whedon

=== Internet, radio and television personalities ===
- Andy Cohen
- Ellen DeGeneres
- Perez Hilton
- Star Jones
- Gayle King
- Bill Maher
- Bill Nye
- Suze Orman
- Maury Povich
- Cristina Saralegui
- Stuart Scott
- Jerry Springer
- Howard Stern
- Martha Stewart
- Wendy Williams

=== Musicians ===
- 50 Cent
- Franco Battiato
- Herb Alpert
- Marc Anthony
- Burt Bacharach
- Jeff Beck
- Natasha Bedingfield
- Mary J. Blige
- Jon Bon Jovi
- Jimmy Buffett
- David Byrne
- Colbie Caillat
- Mariah Carey
- Cher
- Kelly Clarkson
- Common
- Chris Cornell
- Sheryl Crow
- Ice Cube
- Miley Cyrus
- Dennis DeYoung
- Neil Diamond
- Jack Dishel
- Snoop Dogg
- Bob Dylan
- El Debarge
- Gloria Estefan
- Ben Folds
- Peter Frampton
- Aretha Franklin
- Michael Franti
- Lady Gaga
- Al Green
- Josh Groban
- Buddy Guy
- Merle Haggard
- Anthony Hamilton
- Herbie Hancock
- Jennifer Hudson
- Mick Jagger
- Elton John
- Jack Johnson
- Quincy Jones
- Toby Keith
- R. Kelly
- Alicia Keys
- B.B. King
- Carole King
- Beyoncé Knowles
- Dave Koz
- Jay-Z
- Adam Lambert
- Cyndi Lauper
- John Legend
- Jared Leto
- Adam Levine
- Jennifer Lopez
- LeToya Luckett
- Ludacris
- Lykke Li
- Madonna
- Chris Martin
- Ricky Martin
- Dave Matthews
- Paul McCartney
- John Mellencamp
- Bette Midler
- Nicki Minaj
- Moby
- Janelle Monáe
- Jason Mraz
- Nas
- Ne-Yo
- Willie Nelson
- Randy Newman
- Thao Nguyen
- Aubrey O'Day
- Joell Ortiz
- Katy Perry
- Pink
- Pitbull
- Pras
- Busta Rhymes
- Flo Rida
- Axl Rose
- Rick Ross
- Kelly Rowland
- Ray-J
- Rza
- Johnny Rzeznik
- Jessica Sanchez
- Shakira
- Paul Simon
- Trey Songz
- Regina Spektor
- Bruce Springsteen
- Yvonne Staples
- Barbra Streisand
- Serj Tankian
- James Taylor
- Toni Tennille
- T.I.
- Treach
- Tune-Yards
- Justin Timberlake
- Usher
- Eddie Vedder
- Pete Wentz
- Kanye West
- will.i.am
- Stevie Wonder
- Chely Wright

==== Bands ====
- Arcade Fire
- Crosby, Stills and Nash
- Delta Rae
- Earth, Wind & Fire
- Far East Movement
- Foo Fighters
- Green Day
- The National
- OK Go
- Pearl Jam
- Red Hot Chili Peppers
- Scissor Sisters
- Why?
- Yacht

=== Adult entertainers ===
- Lisa Ann
- Dana DeArmond
- Jessica Drake
- Jenna Haze
- Ron Jeremy
- Kimberly Kane
- Kayden Kross
- Kristina Rose

=== Screenwriters and producers ===
- Lawrence Bender
- Dustin Lance Black
- Barbara Broccoli
- Brian Grazer
- Kathleen Kennedy
- Jon Landau
- Frank Marshall
- Aaron Sorkin
- Harvey Weinstein

=== Writers ===
- Maya Angelou
- Paul Dini
- Roger Ebert
- Jodie Evans
- Elizabeth Gilbert
- John Green
- Crystal Nix-Hines
- Stephen King
- Gersh Kuntzman
- Anne Lamott
- Edward Lazarus
- Paul Levy
- Chuck Lorre
- Seth MacFarlane
- George R.R. Martin
- Rick Moody
- Wes Moore
- Ryan Murphy
- Maurice Sendak
- Lemony Snicket
- Ayelet Waldman
- Anna Wintour

== Athletes ==
=== Boxing ===
- Muhammad Ali
- Sugar Shane Mosley
- Floyd Mayweather
- Mike Tyson

=== Baseball (MLB) ===
- Hank Aaron
- Derek Jeter
- Willie Mays

=== Basketball (NBA) ===
- Carmelo Anthony
- B. J. Armstrong
- Shane Battier
- Chris Bosh
- Vince Carter
- Mike D'Antoni
- Kevin Durant
- Patrick Ewing
- Grant Hill
- LeBron James
- Magic Johnson
- Michael Jordan
- Alonzo Mourning
- Joakim Noah
- Shaquille O'Neal
- Chris Paul
- Austin Rivers
- Derrick Rose
- Etan Thomas

=== Football (NFL) ===
- Jim Brown
- Earl Campbell
- Marques Colston
- Victor Cruz
- Vernon Davis
- Desmond Howard
- Chris Kluwe
- Jerry Rice
- Antrel Rolle
- Warren Sapp
- Takeo Spikes

=== Soccer (association football) ===
- Wayne Rooney
- Cristiano Ronaldo

=== Skateboarding ===
- Rob Dyrdek

=== Professional wrestling ===
- CM Punk

== Nobel Prize laureates ==
=== Economics ===
- Michael Spence, 2001
- Joseph Stiglitz, 2001
- Paul Krugman, 2008

=== Science ===
- Alexei Abrikosov, Physics, 2003
- Peter Agre, Chemistry, 2003
- Sidney Altman, Chemistry, 1989
- Philip Anderson, Physics, 1977
- David Baltimore, Medicine 1975
- Paul Berg, Chemistry, 1980
- J. Michael Bishop, Medicine, 1989
- Elizabeth Blackburn, Medicine, 2009
- Günter Blobel, Medicine, 1999
- Nicolaas Bloembergen, Physics, 1981
- Linda Buck, Medicine, 2004
- Mario Capecchi, Medicine, 2007
- Martin Chalfie, Chemistry, 2008
- Leon Cooper, Physics, 1972
- James Cronin, Physics, 1980
- Robert Curl, Chemistry, 1996
- Johann Deisenhofer, Chemistry, 1988
- Edmond Fischer, Medicine, 1992
- Val Fitch, Physics, 1980
- Jerome Friedman, Physics, 1990
- Murray Gell-Mann, Physics, 1969
- Walter Gilbert, Chemistry, 1980
- Donald Glaser, Physics, 1960
- Sheldon Glashow, Physics, 1979
- Roy Glauber, Physics, 2005
- Joseph L. Goldstein, Medicine, 1985
- Paul Greengard, Medicine, 2000
- Carol Greider, Medicine, 2009
- David Gross, Physics, 2004
- Robert Grubbs, Chemistry, 2005
- Roger Guillemin, Medicine, 1977
- John Hall, Physics, 2005
- Leland Hartwell, Medicine, 2001
- Alan Heeger, Chemistry, 2000
- Dudley Herschbach, Chemistry, 1986
- Roald Hoffmann, Chemistry, 1981
- H. Robert Horvitz, Medicine, 2002
- David Hubel, Medicine, 1981
- Eric Kandel, Medicine, 2000
- Brian Kobilka, Chemistry, 2012
- Roger Kornberg, Chemistry, 2006
- Leon Lederman, Physics, 1988
- Robert Lefkowitz, Chemistry, 2012
- John Mather, Physics, 2006
- Craig Mello, Medicine, 2006
- Mario Molina, Chemistry, 1995
- Douglas Osheroff, Physics, 1996
- Arno Penzias, Physics, 1978
- Martin Perl, Physics, 1995
- David Politzer, Physics, 2004
- Stanley Prusiner, Medicine, 1997
- Burton Richter, Physics, 1976
- Richard Schrock, Chemistry, 2005
- Hamilton Smith, Medicine, 1978
- Oliver Smithies, Medicine, 2007
- George Smoot, Physics, 2006
- Thomas Steitz, Chemistry, 2009
- Jack Szostak, Medicine, 2009
- Charles Townes, Physics, 1964
- Roger Tsien, Chemistry, 2008
- Daniel Tsui, Physics, 1998
- James Watson, Medicine, 1962
- Carl Wieman, Physics, 2001
- Eric Wieschaus, Medicine, 1995
- Frank Wilczek, Physics, 2004
- Robert Wilson, Physics, 1978

== See also ==
- List of Mitt Romney presidential campaign endorsements, 2012
- List of Barack Obama presidential campaign endorsements, 2008
- Barack Obama presidential campaign, 2012
- Endorsements for the Republican Party presidential primaries, 2012
