= Charlotte Newhouse =

American actress and writer

- Born: United States
- Education: Columbia University (BA)
- Occupations: Actress, writer
- Known for: Creating the series Idiotsitter
- Relatives: Samuel Irving Newhouse Sr. (great-uncle)

Charlotte Newhouse is an American actress and writer known for creating, and starring in the Comedy Central series Idiotsitter, which premiered in 2014. She also appeared in Reno 911! (2006), Community (2009), The Man That I Was (2010), The Big Bang Theory ("The Desperation Emanation") (2010), Celebrity Impression (2010), Workaholics (2011), and Puss in Boots: The Three Diablos (2012).

Newhouse was a member of The Groundlings, along with Laurel Coppock and Ryan Gaul. A 2011 L.A. Times review noted their performance as "a cappella singers who enthusiastically perform Toto's "Africa" even though they are missing six members of their group ("Throat Culture") and know only the background and percussion parts". In 2015 she played the lead role of Mackenzie in the comedy short Sensitive Guys, directed by Jason Farrand.

In January 2016, Comedy Central debuted a new series, Idiotsitter, in which Newhouse portrays Harvard graduate Wilhelmina "Billie" Brown, who is hired by wealthy, negligent parents to supervise their incorrigible grown daughter, Gene (Jillian Bell), who is serving time under house arrest. Idiotsitter was launched as a web series in early 2014, before being picked up in June 2014 by Comedy Central for network airing. The show renewed for a second season in 2016. She is a creator of the show with Workaholics co-star Jillian Bell, who she met as a member of the Los Angeles–based comedy troupe The Groundlings.

== Personal life ==
Newhouse graduated from Columbia University in 2001. She is the daughter of Yale-educated Mark Newhouse, an executive at Advance Publications, general manager of The Star-Ledger, cousin of Samuel Irving Newhouse Jr. and Donald Newhouse. Her grandfather, Norman Newhouse, is a former editor of Long Island Press, the managing editor of Staten Island Advance, and brother of the late Samuel Irving Newhouse Sr. She is a member of the Newhouse family that owns multiple publications and media outlets such as Condé Nast, Discovery Channel, and Reddit.
