= Jonathan Newhouse =

American publisher (born 1952)

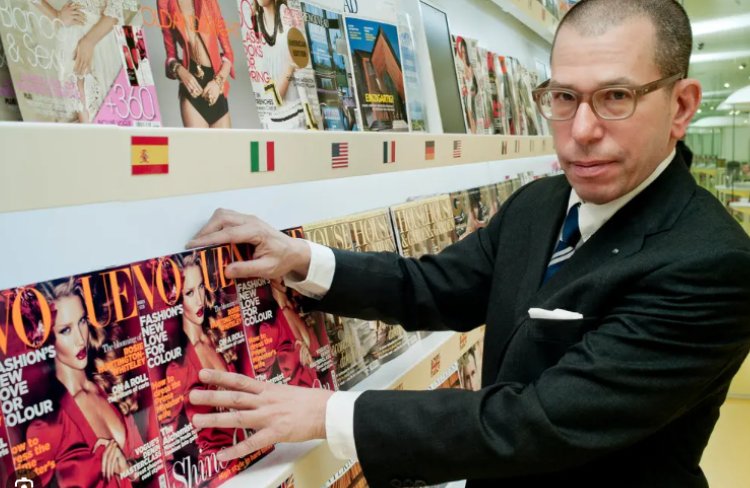
- Born: March 30, 1952 (age 73); New York City, U.S.
- Occupation: Publisher
- Title: Chairman Condé Nast
- Spouse: Ronnie Cooke (m. 1995)
- Parent(s): Norman Newhouse; Alice Newhouse
- Relatives: Samuel Irving Newhouse Sr. (uncle); Si Newhouse (cousin)

Jonathan Newhouse (born March 30, 1952) is a United States-born media executive who has served since 2019 as Chairman of the Board of Conde Nast, publisher of Vogue, Vanity Fair and The New Yorker, among other notable publications. Prior to that he served as chairman and Chief Executive of Conde Nast International for nearly three decades.

As head of Conde Nast International, Newhouse was the architect of the media company's international expansion, adding nearly 100 publications and more than 20 geographic markets to its organisational footprint. He directed the launch of Vogue in China, India, Russia, Japan, Mexico and many other markets as well as growing new brands around the world.

== Early life and education ==
Newhouse was born to Norman and Alice Newhouse. He grew up in suburban New York alongside his three brothers and sister. His father Norman worked closely with his two brothers, Samuel I. Newhouse and Theodore Newhouse as a senior executives in the newspaper division of the family-owned business, known today as Advance. His family moved to New Orleans when he was a teenager, and he graduated from Isidore Newman School, where he was editor of the school newspaper and voted by fellow students as most talented.

He attended Yale University but dropped out in his junior year and joined the Advance organisation's newspaper division.

== Career ==
Newhouse's first job was press operator at The Springfield Union in Springfield, Massachusetts. He worked several years at the Staten Island Advance as a reporter, editor and in management positions. In 1980, he moved to Conde Nast where he held a series of posts. He was the Executive Vice President of The New Yorker after its acquisition by Conde Nast's parent, Advance, in 1985 and in the late 1980s, became the publisher of Details. Toward the end of 1989 he was tapped to lead Conde Nast International, then organised as a separate company based in Paris.

Conde Nast International at that time confined its publishing to the five major Western European markets Britain, France, Italy, Germany and Spain along with licensed titles in Brazil and Australia. Newhouse expanded the magazine operations into many Asian markets including China, Japan, South Korea, India, Taiwan and Thailand, starting with Vogue and adding other titles. Conde Nast International launched in new European markets, including Russia, Poland, Holland, Greece, the Czech Republic, Hungary, Ukraine, Sweden, Iceland, Romania, Bulgaria, Serbia and Portugal. The company moved into Africa with the startup of licensed titles in South Africa. Vogue was launched in Turkey, and Conde Nast magazines were licensed in the Middle East, based in Dubai. Vogue and sister titles were launched in Mexico and Latin America. Many new magazine brands were established internationally, among them GQ, Glamour, Vanity Fair, Conde Nast Traveller, AD and Wired. In his nearly 30 years at the helm of the international arm of Conde Nast, he grew the number of publications from 30 to approximately 125.

During this period, like many media companies, Conde Nast International moved into digital publishing, including websites, social media and video. Newhouse forged growth into new business sectors, hospitality and education. Conde Nast International opened Vogue Cafes and GQ Bars in Moscow, Kiev and Dubai. The Conde Nast College of Fashion and Design opened, with branches in London, Shanghai and Madrid. While Conde Nast International as a private company did not publicly release financials, The New York Times reported in 2017 that it was profitable with revenues of more than $1 billion.

Newhouse worked closely with many of the organisation's top editors, including Franca Sozzani at Italian Vogue and Carine Roitfeld and Emmanuelle Alt at Vogue Paris. He named Edward Enninful, a British man who arrived as a child immigrant from Ghana, as Editor of British Vogue in 2017, the first Black editor of a Vogue in what is regarded as a landmark appointment.

In April 2019, after more than a century operating as independent companies, Conde Nast in the US and Conde Nast International were combined into a single organisation. Newhouse became chairman of the Board of the new company.

== Honours and board memberships ==
Newhouse was honored as an Officer in the Order of Arts & Letters of France in 2008. He received an honorary fellowship from the Shenkar College of Engineering, Design and Art in Tel Aviv, Israel, in 2017. He was listed in the Business of Fashion's list of the most influential people in fashion from the inception of the listing and was named to its Hall of Fame in 2018.

He has been a board director of Vestiaire Collective since 2018 and Turnitin since 2019. He is a past board member of Farfetch from 2017 to 2019.

Newhouse became a Trustee of Girl Effect, a Nairobi-based NGO, in 2020 and was named its board chair later that year. He has been a Trustee of Somerset House in London since 2020. He is a past Patron of Anti-Slavery International (2018 to 2023) and a former Trustee of the Marymount School of New York.

== Art ==
Newhouse is an artist who works primarily in pencil on paper, mainly portraits. His work has been published in Lux magazine.

== Personal life ==
Newhouse married Ronnie Cooke in 1995. Ronnie Cooke Newhouse is the owner and creative director of House + Holme, a studio known for its fashion advertising.

After moving Conde Nast International's headquarters to London in the mid-1990s, Newhouse became a British citizen in 2004. He holds dual US and British citizenship.
