= Jeff Jarvis =

American journalist (born 1954)

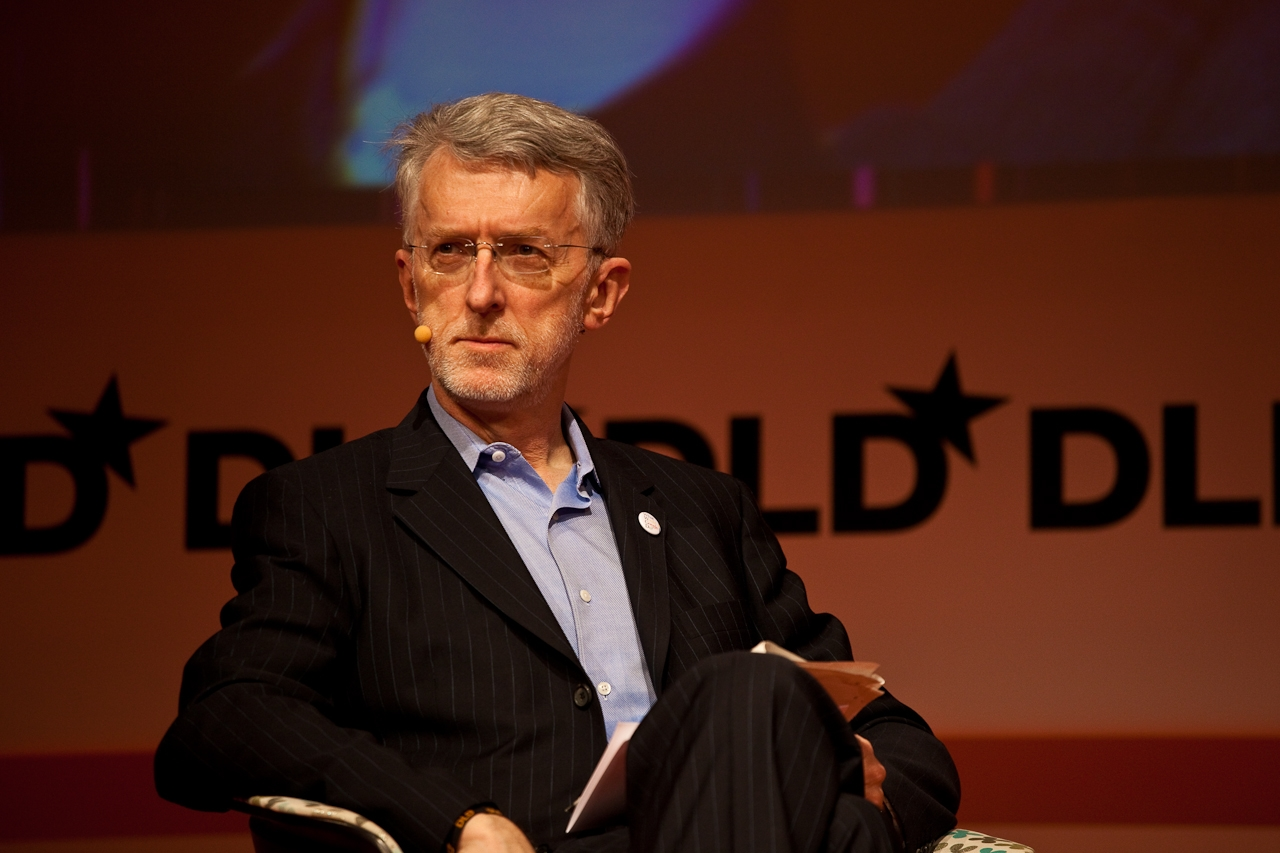
- Jarvis at the 2009 DLD Conference
- Born: July 15, 1954 (age 72); Oak Park, Illinois, US
- Presenting career
- Show: Intelligent Machines / AI Inside
- Website: jeffjarvis.com

Jeffrey A. Jarvis (born July 15, 1954) is an American journalist, associate professor, public speaker and former television critic. He advocates the Open Web and argues that there are many social and personal benefits to living a more public life on the Internet.

== Career ==
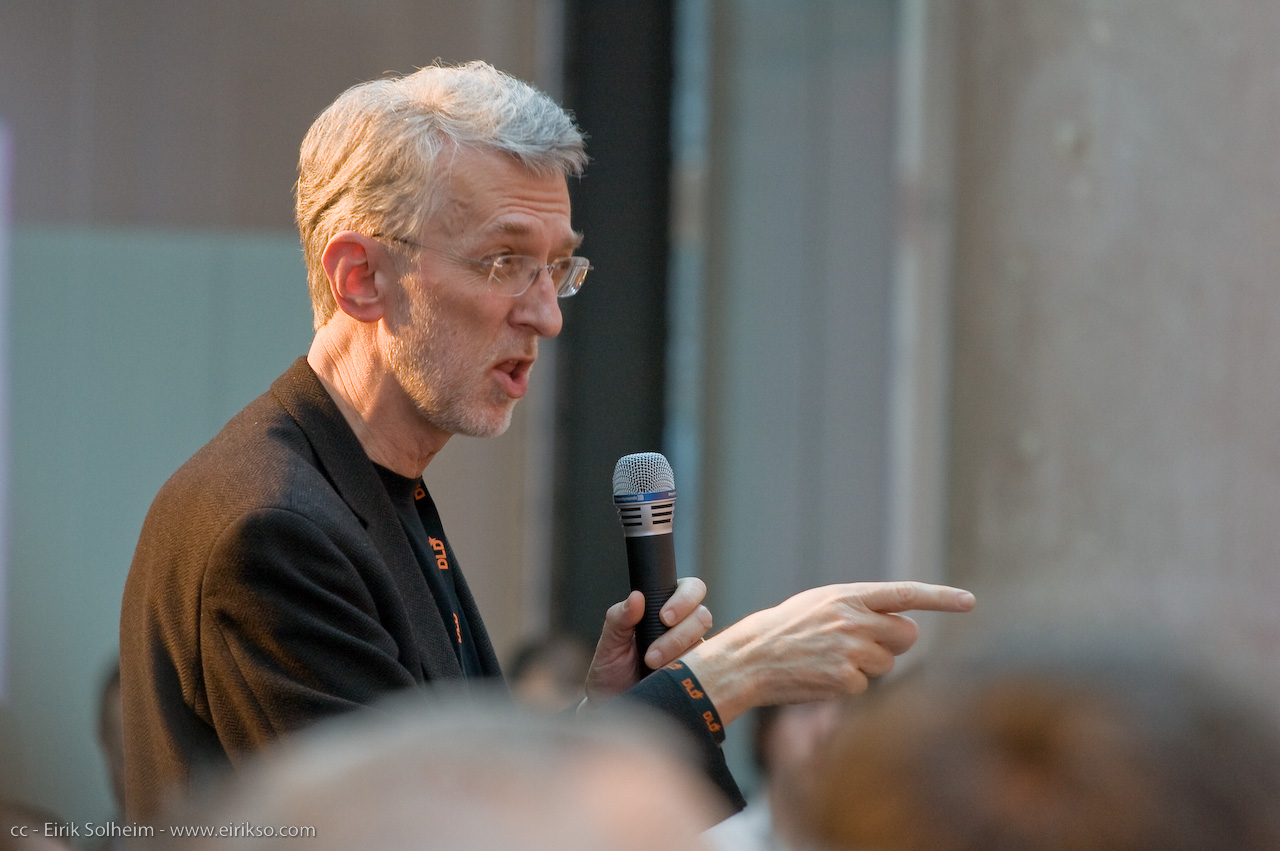
Jarvis in 2008

Jarvis began his career in journalism in 1972 writing for the Addison Herald-Register, a local weekly newspaper at which he was the sole journalist. In 1974 Jarvis was an undergraduate in the Medill School of Journalism at Northwestern University when he was hired by the Chicago Tribune. He completed his degree and holds a BSJ from Northwestern.

Jarvis went on to work as a television critic for TV Guide and People magazines. In 1984, while still at People, Jarvis proposed the idea for Entertainment Weekly, a magazine which he hoped would feature "tough reviews and offbeat subjects" pertaining to the entertainment industry. The first issue was published in February 1990, with Jarvis as creator and managing editor. On June 12 of the same year, Jarvis left the publication; spokesman Peter Castiglio cited "creative differences" between Jarvis and senior management as the cause for his departure. Jarvis was the resident "couch critic" at TV Guide throughout the 1990s.

Jarvis is former Sunday editor and associate publisher of the New York Daily News and a former columnist for the San Francisco Examiner. He was president and creative director of Advance Internet—the online arm of Advance Publications—until 2005. He has consulted for numerous other media companies. In 2005, he became an associate professor at City University of New York's Graduate School of Journalism, directing its new media program.

Jarvis is the creator of the weblog BuzzMachine, which tracks developments in new media and chronicles some of the author's personal obsessions, such as the fortunes of radio host Howard Stern. He gained national notoriety when he wrote about his negative experiences in dealing with Dell Computer's customer support system on the website.

Along with Leo Laporte and Paris Martineau, Jarvis is a co-host on Intelligent Machines, a live-streamed podcast show on the TWiT Network which covers Artificial Intelligence and future computing news.

== Books ==
In 2009, Jarvis wrote a book called, What Would Google Do? In the book, he argues that companies and individuals should study and perhaps copy Google's methods for succeeding at Internet entrepreneurship. Jarvis said of the book, "Just as I try to look admiringly from a distance at Google, I include anecdotes and examples from Mark Zuckerberg at Facebook and Craig Newmark at Craigslist and Jeff Bezos at Amazon."

In 2011, Jarvis published Public Parts: How Sharing in the Digital Age Improves the Way We Work and Live, in which he defends the openness of the Internet, discusses ways in which the Internet has made modern life public, and argues against regulations to protect privacy. Public Parts was reviewed scathingly by fellow Internet scholar Evgeny Morozov in the November 3, 2011, issue of The New Republic.

In 2012, Jarvis published the Kindle single Gutenberg the Geek, in which he suggests that Johannes Gutenberg was "the world's first technology entrepreneur" and was comparable to Steve Jobs because they both "accomplished greatness through trial and error, vision, and determination."

In 2026, Jarvis published Hot Type: The Magnificent Machine That Gave Birth to Mass Media and Drove Mark Twain Mad, which explores how the Linotype machine transformed printing and helped usher in the era of mass media.

== Politics ==
Jarvis describes himself as a "liberal: a centrist leaning left." A Democrat, Jarvis initially supported Hillary Rodham Clinton in the 2008 primaries and then supported Barack Obama. He voted for Obama in 2008 and 2012, but criticized some of Obama's policies, particularly with respect to surveillance and transparency.

Jarvis also describes himself as "a post-9/11 hawk."

== Personal life ==
In 2009, Jarvis was diagnosed with prostate cancer via a PSA test; he underwent a successful treatment. Jarvis and his wife, Tammy, have two children.

== Twitter parody ==
Jarvis is the subject of a popular Twitter parody account, @ProfJeffJarvis, curated by Rurik Bradbury. The parody account has been enthusiastically received among many in media circles with over 30,000 followers. "I chose Jarvis because he epitomizes a certain type of 'thinkfluencer,' " Bradbury explains, "someone with an online influence massively greater than the thoughtfulness of his positions. It's all style and rhetorical flourishes which don't stand up to scrutiny—but do grab attention." Jarvis is not a fan of @ProfJeffJarvis, calling Bradbury, "my minor tormentor, my idiot imposter, my personal troll." He reached out to a Twitter executive to complain, but declined to pursue further action.
