= Jim Amoss =

American newspaper editor and journalist

Walter James Amoss III (born October 22, 1947) is former editor of The Times-Picayune. Under his leadership and that of the publisher, Ashton Phelps Jr., the paper won two Pulitzer Prizes in 1997 for public service and editorial cartooning, and in 2006 won two more Pulitzer Prizes for its coverage of Hurricane Katrina.

== Early life and education ==
Amoss is a native of New Orleans, Louisiana. His family lived abroad in Germany and Belgium for many years during his childhood. He attended Gymnasium Barkof in Bremen, Germany. He returned to New Orleans for his junior year of high school, graduating from Jesuit High School (1965).

He graduated magna cum laude from Yale University (1969), where he majored in German literature. He studied at the University of Oxford as a Rhodes Scholar, specializing in German literature and the work of Thomas Mann.

After completing his studies during the Vietnam War, Amoss applied for conscientious objector status. Granted the designation, he worked as an orderly in Boston City Hospital. Upon returning to New Orleans two years later, Amoss enrolled in a night course at Loyola University New Orleans on the basics of journalism.

== Career ==
He began his journalism career in 1974 as an intern, and later a reporter, with the city's afternoon daily, The States-Item. His reporting included several investigations with reporting partner Dean Baquet, including one into organized crime kingpin Carlos Marcello.

After the merger of The States-Item with The Times-Picayune in 1980, Amoss was named bureau chief in St. Bernard Parish before he became city editor in 1982, then metro editor in 1983 and associate editor in 1988. He was named editor of The Times-Picayune in July 1990. He was offered the position in the spring of 1990, after he had accepted a Nieman Fellowship at Harvard University; he declined the fellowship. In October 2012, he added the title of vice president of content for NOLA Media Group, a new company composed of the newspaper and its affiliate website, NOLA.com.

During his tenure, The Times-Picayune evolved from being regarded as one of the nation's worst big-city newspapers to winning acclaim as one of its best. In a 1997 interview with the American Journalism Review, Amoss said, "There is a false hypothesis that the Times-Picayune was floundering until Jim Amoss took over. When I took over from [predecessor] Charlie Ferguson this was a paper that was sure of its mission and already had in place a substantial number of the building blocks to carry it out."

Colleagues have described Amoss as having a knack for "finding, promoting and deploying good editors" coupled with a "low-key management style," in which "he would authorize his lieutenants ... to guide the paper as best we saw fit, and he would intervene ... only in the event that he saw problems."

In 2012, Amoss led meetings on May 24 announcing to the newspaper's staff that its owner, Advance Publications, had decided the print edition of the Times-Picayune would be published only three days a week (Wednesday, Friday, and Sunday) beginning that fall. On June 12, 2012, Amoss and other managers informed more than 200 members of the newspaper staff that their last day at the company would be September 30, 2012. Amoss oversaw a cut of 84 employees from the newsroom, nearly half of the staff of 175. With new hiring, he said, the news gathering staff ultimately would total 151. Amoss the next day defended the decision in a front-page letter to readers, saying, "we made it in order to preserve and grow the journalism we and our community value."

In an interview with the Columbia Journalism Review published in March 2013, Amoss explained further: "I think fundamentally, newspapers right now are choosing between remaining as they are and hoping that somehow things will turn around, or restructuring radically in order to have a long-term future. When I say that I think that our owners have invested, I mean that they chose the second path. All the evidence points to—and this is why I decided to stay, by the way—their wanting to stay in business long-term, and figure out in an intellectually rigorous way how to do so."

NOLA.com announced on September 3, 2015, that Amoss would be stepping down as editor, remaining on the editorial board into the fall, when he would become an editor at large for Advance Digital, an affiliate of the news organization. His replacement is state/metro editor Mark Lorando. Amoss' last day at NOLA.com | The Times-Picayune was October 22, 2015, his 68th birthday.

== Awards ==
Amoss was named Editor of the Year by the National Press Foundation in 1996 and by Editor and Publisher in 2006, when he also won the American Society of News Editors' award for Editorial Leadership.

In 2006 Amoss received the 2005 Henri Nannen Prize for his editorial work on The Times-Picayune.

He served for nine years as a member of the Pulitzer Prize Board and is a member of the Board of Visitors of the Manship School of Mass Communication at Louisiana State University.

Nola Media Group established an annual employee award in his honor, the Amoss Award, in 2017. It recognizes "timeless journalism that earned the trust of the community and the respect of colleagues."

Amoss is a classical pianist and describes himself as "hopelessly addicted to ice cream and good chocolate."
