= The Times (Trenton) =

Daily newspaper in New Jersey

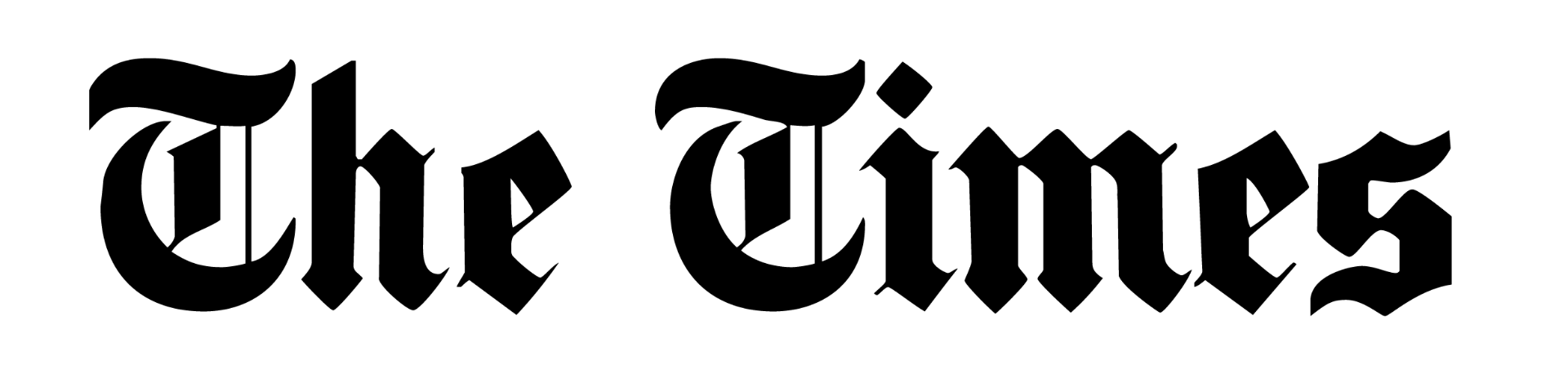

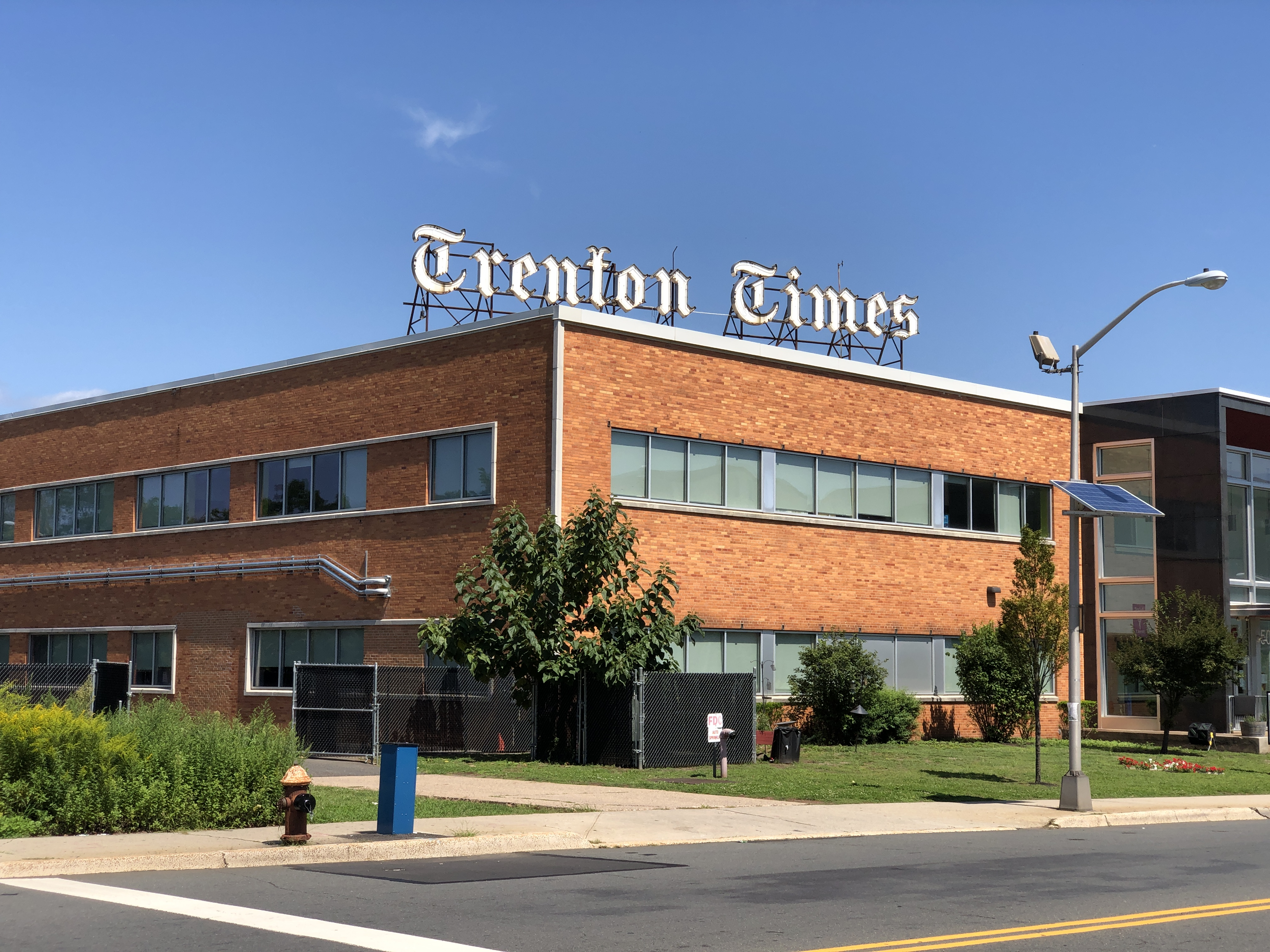
- Former headquarters of The Times, now occupied by Trenton's 9th Grade Academy
- Type: Daily newspaper
- Owner: Advance Publications
- Publisher: Joan Mason
- Editor: Matt Dowling
- Founded: 1882; 144 years ago
- Language: English
- City: Trenton, New Jersey, U.S
- Country: United States
- ISSN: 8750-9083
- Website: www.nj.com/times/

The Times, also known as The Times of Trenton and The Trenton Times, is a daily digital newspaper owned by Advance Publications that serves Trenton and the Mercer County, New Jersey area, with a strong focus on the government of New Jersey. It was ranked fifth in total circulation among newspapers in New Jersey (the paper had a daily circulation of 77,405, with a Sunday circulation of 88,336). It competes with the Trentonian, making it the smallest market in the United States with two competing daily newspapers.

== History ==
The Trenton Times was founded in 1882. The paper was owned by the Kerney family from the turn of the 20th century, and was sold to The Washington Post Company in 1974 for $16 million. Washington Post Company management had committed to overcoming its crosstown rival, the Trentonian, which had been founded in 1945 (by personnel on strike against The Times) and had been taking circulation away from The Times since its inception. The new management began a morning edition and started circulating a Saturday edition, led by a number of editors, publishers and circulation experts imported from The Post. Despite this commitment, The Times lost in excess of 11,000 daily readers in the 1970s, while the Trentonian gained 13,000. By 1982, the Trentonian had pulled ahead of The Times in daily circulation, and held a 67,000 to 62,000 edge in daily papers as of 1987. Area newspaper readers never adopted the Post's approach of turning The Times into a paper with a serious national and international focus, preferring the tabloid Trentonian and its local focus on "cheerful photographs of local residents". The difficulties faced by The Times were so challenging that Katharine Graham, chairman of The Post, called her experiences with The Times as her "Vietnam."

Allbritton Communications Company bought the paper from The Washington Post Company on October 30, 1981, paying $10 to $12 million for the paper. Allbritton reduced news staff at The Times from 80 employees to 56 shortly after its takeover, and made further cuts down to 52. In December 1981, The Times announced that it was dropping its evening edition and would become morning-only as of December 21, 1981. Frustrations with what was perceived as business office interference with news reporting led to defections by a quarter of the news staff in early 1982. The home city was dropped from the title in 1985 as part of an effort to reach out to a broader suburban audience, with separate editions published for (and focusing on) the Trenton, Princeton and Burlington County areas. In December 1986, the paper was sold by Albritton for $50 million to Advance Publications, the privately held company owned by the Newhouse family.

In 1987, the revitalized Trenton Times surpassed the tabloid Trentonian in both daily and Sunday paid circulation. The Trentonian responded by adding bikini-clad women on Page 6 but despite this tactic, the Times continued to surpass the Trentonian in paid circulation into the 21st century.

In 2011, the historic offices on Perry Street in Trenton, by this time in a state of advanced decay, with very serious roof leaks that at one point completely soaked the newspaper library and its years of paper clippings, were sold to a new owner who proposed to convert the building and its parking lot into a fabricated concrete distribution facility. In 2015, work began at the Perry Street building. In February 2017, it became the home of the International Academy of Trenton. The building was taken over by the Trenton Public School District for a Ninth Grade Academy after the charter school failed to have its charter renewed by the state.

Printing of the paper was outsourced to the Staten Island Advance, another Newhouse newspaper. Strict, early evening newsroom deadlines were imposed so that the printing schedule would fit that of the Advance.

When the building was sold, the remaining Times crew, numbering around 30, moved into leased offices at River View Plaza beside Waterfront Park, the Mercer County ballpark. Longtime Editor-in-Chief and Publisher Brian Malone retired; and his editorial replacement, Matt Dowling, and new Publisher Sheila Gallagher-Montone struggled to keep the brand alive. Restructuring efforts initially led to a repopulation of the newsroom, as the headcount expanded and the editorial operations reacquired some of their former liveliness. Soon the paper was noted for its singular resilience amid the general decline of the Newhouse newspaper publications. Gallagher-Montone even went so far as to call it "the Times Miracle" in a year-end staff meeting. Within a year or two, however, the tone had changed considerably, and Gallagher-Montone announced in another staff meeting that the paper was "making budget" (meaning meeting revenue targets) but stopped short of saying that it was profitable. Gallagher-Montone retired in 2015, and former vice president of sales Joan Mason took her place as publisher. The series of layoffs continued, with the most recent occurring in the late spring of 2016.

Several former reporters later became successful novelists, including John Katzenbach, Christina Hoag and Lenore Look.

On September 14, 2023, the paper announced it would cease publication of its Saturday print edition, moving to an all-digital delivery of the Saturday edition beginning in 2024. On October 31, 2024, the paper announced that it would be ceasing production of its print edition entirely on February 2, 2025.
