= The Times-Picayune/The New Orleans Advocate =

American newspaper published in New Orleans, Louisiana

The Times-Picayune | The New Orleans Advocate

- Front page of The Times-Picayune, September 2, 2005
- Type: Daily newspaper
- Format: Broadsheet
- Owner: Georges Media Group
- Publisher: Judi Terzotis
- Editor: Rene Sanchez
- Founded: January 25, 1837; 189 years ago
- Headquarters: 840 St. Charles Ave. New Orleans, Louisiana 70130; United States
- Circulation: (as of 77,565 Daily; 81,398 Sunday as of (2019)
- ISSN: 1055-3053
- Website: nola.com

The Times-Picayune | The New Orleans Advocate is an American newspaper published in New Orleans, Louisiana. Ancestral publications of other names date back to January 25, 1837. The current publication is the result of the 2019 acquisition of The Times-Picayune (which was the result of the 1914 union of The Picayune with the Times-Democrat) by the New Orleans edition of The Advocate in Baton Rouge, Louisiana.

The Times-Picayune was awarded the Pulitzer Prize for Public Service in 1997 for its coverage of threats to the world’s fisheries and in 2006 for its coverage of Hurricane Katrina. Four of The Times-Picayune's staff reporters also received Pulitzers for breaking news reporting for their storm coverage. The paper funded the Edgar A. Poe Award for journalistic excellence, which was presented annually by the White House Correspondents' Association from 1990 to 2019.

== History ==
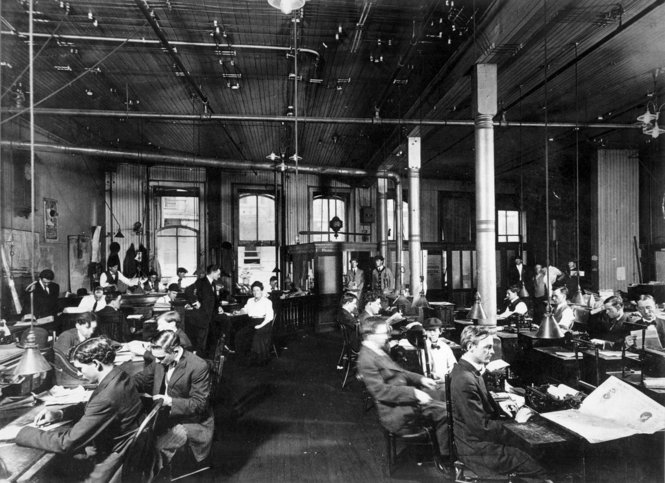
The New Orleans Item newsroom, circa 1900

Established as The Picayune in 1837 by Francis Lumsden and George Wilkins Kendall, the paper's initial price was one picayune, a Spanish coin equivalent to 6¼¢ (half a bit, or one-sixteenth of a dollar). Under Eliza Jane Nicholson, who inherited the struggling paper when her husband died in 1876, the Picayune introduced innovations such as society reporting (known as the "Society Bee" columns), children's pages, and the first women's advice column, which was written by Dorothy Dix. Between 1880 and 1890, the paper more than tripled its circulation. The paper became The Times-Picayune after merging in 1914 with its rival, the New Orleans Times-Democrat.

From 1947 to 1958, the paper operated a radio station, WTPS, launching first on FM at 94.7 MHz on January 3, 1947, and adding an AM station at 1450 kHz a year later. WTPS-AM later moved to 940 kHz. The stations primarily aired music, but also included newscasts drawn from the paper's staff and live broadcasts of local high school, college, and professional sports. Both stations went off the air on November 30, 1958 and was sold to Rounsaville.

In 1962, Samuel Irving Newhouse, Sr., bought The Times-Picayune and the other remaining New Orleans daily, the afternoon States-Item. The papers were merged on June 2, 1980 and were known as The Times-Picayune/States-Item (except on Sundays; the States-Item did not publish a Sunday edition) until September 30, 1986.

In addition to the flagship paper, specific community editions of the newspaper are also circulated and retain the Picayune name, such as the Gretna Picayune for nearby Gretna, Louisiana.

In 2019, The Times-Picayune was purchased by Georges Media, whose chair is John Georges, a New Orleans business owner. Georges Media also publishes The Advocate in Baton Rouge, Louisiana.

In the vernacular of its circulation area, the newspaper is often called the T-P.

=== Hurricane Katrina ===
Hurricane Katrina became a significant part of The Times-Picayune's history, not only during the storm and its immediate aftermath but for years afterward in repercussions and editorials. As Hurricane Katrina approached on Sunday, August 28, 2005, dozens of the newspaper's staffers who opted not to evacuate rode out the storm in their office building, sleeping in sleeping bags and on air mattresses. Holed up in a small, sweltering interior office space—the photography department—outfitted as a "hurricane bunker," the newspaper staffers and staffers from the paper's affiliated website, NOLA.com, posted continual updates on the internet until the building was evacuated on August 30. With electrical outages leaving the presses out of commission after the storm, newspaper and web staffers produced a "newspaper" in electronic PDF format.

On NOLA.com, meanwhile, tens of thousands of evacuated New Orleans and Gulf Coast residents began using the site's forums and blogs, posting pleas for help, offering aid, and directing rescuers. NOLA's nurturing of so-called citizen journalism on a massive scale was hailed by many journalism experts as a watershed, while several agencies credited the site with leading to life-saving rescues and reunions of scattered victims after the storm.

After deciding to evacuate on Tuesday, August 30, because of rising floodwaters and possible security threats, the newspaper and web staff set up operations at The Houma Courier and in Baton Rouge, on the Louisiana State University campus. A small team of reporters and photographers volunteered to stay behind in New Orleans to report from the inside on the city's struggle, looting, and desperation. They armed themselves for security and worked out of a private residence.

The August 30, August 31, and September 1 editions were not printed, but were available online, as was the paper's breaking news blog:

Hurricane Katrina struck metropolitan New Orleans on Monday with a staggering blow, far surpassing Hurricane Betsy, the landmark disaster of an earlier generation. The storm flooded huge swaths of the city, as well as Slidell on the north shore of Lake Pontchartrain, in a process that appeared to be spreading even as night fell.

— Bruce Nolan, August 31, 2005 for The Times-Picayune

After three days of online-only publication, the paper began printing again, first in Houma, La., and beginning September 15, 2005, in Mobile, Ala.; it resumed publication in New Orleans on October 10, 2005. The paper was awarded the Pulitzer Prize for Public Service in 2006 for its storm coverage. Several of its staff reporters also received the award for breaking news reporting for their coverage of Hurricane Katrina––Gordon Russell, Jed Horne and Bob Marshall––marking the first time a Pulitzer had been awarded for online journalism.

In a January 14, 2006 address to the American Bar Association Communications Lawyers Forum, Times-Picayune editor Jim Amoss commented on perhaps the most significant challenge that the staff faced then and continued to face as the future of New Orleans is contemplated:

For us, Katrina is and will be a defining moment of our lives, a story we'll be telling ‘til the day we die. Being a part of the plot is both riveting and deeply unsettling. We don't yet know the end of this story ... It's the story of our lives, and we must both live and chronicle it.

— Jim Amoss, January 14, 2006 at the American Bar Association Communications Lawyers Forum

=== Limited publication dates, launch of The New Orleans Advocate ===
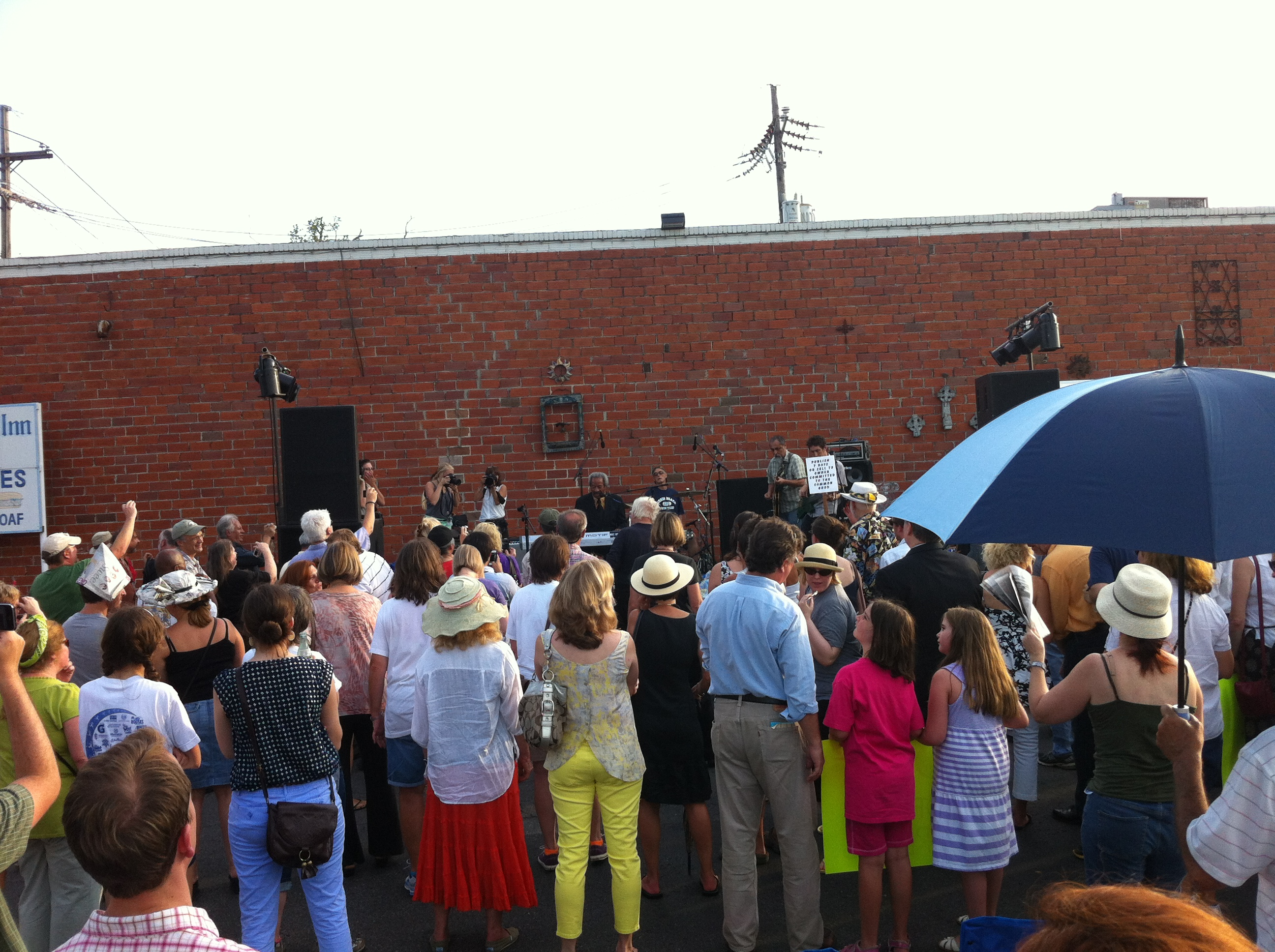
Allen Toussaint playing at one of the ultimately unsuccessful rallies in 2012 to "Save the Picayune" as a daily newspaper

On May 24, 2012, the paper's owner, Advance Publications, announced that the print edition of the Times-Picayune would be published three days a week (Wednesday, Friday, and Sunday) beginning at the end of September. News of the change was first revealed the night before in a blog post by New York Times media writer David Carr. A new company, NOLA Media Group, was created to oversee both the paper and its website, NOLA.com. Along with the change in its printing schedule, Advance also announced that significant cuts would be coming to the newsroom and staff of the Picayune. A second new company, Advance Central Services Louisiana, was created to print and deliver the newspaper.

The decision to end daily circulation led to protests calling for continued publication for the common good; fifty local businesses wrote an open letter to the Newhouse family, urging them to sell the paper instead since they had stated it was still profitable. An ad hoc group of community institutions and civic leaders, The Times-Picayune Citizens Group, was formed to seek alternatives for the continued daily publication of the newspaper.

In October 2012, The Times-Picayune began publishing its broadsheet paper on Wednesdays, Fridays, and Sundays. Along with the change, the paper began publishing a special tabloid-sized edition following Sunday and Monday New Orleans Saints football games and an "early" Sunday broadsheet edition, available on Saturdays. The thrice-weekly publication schedule made New Orleans the largest American city not to have a daily newspaper, until The Advocate of Baton Rouge began publishing a New Orleans edition each day to fill the perceived gap on August 18, 2013. On June 12, 2012, Advance followed through with its layoff plans, as about 200 Times-Picayune employees (including almost half of the newsroom staff) were notified that they would lose their jobs.

In January 2013, NOLA Media Group moved its news-gathering operation, along with sales, marketing, and other administrative functions, from its building at 3800 Howard Avenue, New Orleans, to offices on the 32nd and 31st floors of the One Canal Place office tower at 365 Canal Street, New Orleans. Advance Central Services Louisiana employees remained at Howard Avenue.

In April 2018, NOLA Media Group moved from the offices at One Canal Place to a newly renovated location at 201 St. Joseph Street, New Orleans. Its news staff, sales and sales support staff, marketing, and other administrative staff now work from the Warehouse District offices, offices in St. Tammany Parish at 500 River Highlands Blvd., Covington, and the existing East Jefferson Times-Picayune Bureau at 4013 N Interstate 10 Service Road W, Metairie.

=== The Times-Picayune's resumption of daily publication ===
On April 30, 2013, the paper's publisher announced plans to print a tabloid version of The Times-Picayune, called Times-Picayune Street, on Mondays, Tuesdays, and Thursdays, sold only through newsstands and retail locations. The move returned the paper to a daily printing schedule (including the "early" Sunday edition offered at newsstands on Saturdays). The TP Street edition first went on sale Monday, June 24, 2013.

The new edition removed from New Orleans the designation as the largest city in the United States without its own daily newspaper; with The Times-Picayune and the New Orleans edition of The Advocate, the city now has two. However, in reporting its print circulation figures to the Alliance for Audited Media, The Times-Picayune still provides data only for the home-delivery days of Sunday, Wednesday, and Friday.

The paper returned to a full broadsheet format for all editions on September 6, 2014, and ceased using the "TP Street" name. On the same date, NOLA Media Group began publishing "bonus" editions of The Times-Picayune on Saturdays and Mondays to be home-delivered to all three-day subscribers at no additional cost. The bonus editions were delivered for 17 weeks, the duration of the 2014 football season. On January 3, 2015, NOLA Media Group returned the paper to its previous three-day home delivery, printing two-section papers for street sales only on the other four days. On Saturday, February 13, 2016, NOLA Media Group debuted a street-sales-only "Early Sunday" edition, a hybrid of features from the former Saturday street-sales-only paper and sections from the Sunday paper, offered at the Sunday price.

=== Additional cuts ===
On October 21, 2014, the paper announced it would begin printing and packaging The Times-Picayune in Mobile, Alabama, sometime in late 2015 or early 2016, closing the plant on Howard Avenue in New Orleans and eliminating more than 100 jobs at Advance Central Services Louisiana. The Howard Avenue building, which housed all aspects of the newspaper operation, opened in 1968. The building's lobby is lined with custom panels by sculptor Enrique Alferez, showing symbols used in communication throughout history. Although NOLA Media Group said in 2014 that it hoped to donate the building to a nonprofit institution in the community, it ultimately sold the building on September 2, 2016, to a local investor group for $3.5 million. The newspaper of Sunday, January 17, 2016, was the last Times-Picayune to be printed in New Orleans. The street-sales-only newspaper of Monday, January 18, 2016, was the first to be printed in Mobile. The New Orleans presses were to be decommissioned.

The circulation numbers for the printed Times-Picayune were the largest newspaper in Louisiana until the end of 2014. By then, declines in its sales, combined with circulation gains by The Advocate, dropped The Times-Picayune to second place behind The Advocate.

NOLA Media Group announced on June 15, 2015, that it would join with Alabama Media Group in a new regional media company across Louisiana, Alabama and Mississippi, to be called Southeast Regional Media Group. Additional job losses were expected in Louisiana; those cuts came September 17, 2015, when NOLA Media Group fired 37 journalists, 28 of them full-time employees and nine part-timers. Hardest-hit were the Baton Rouge bureau, which had been expanded in the 2012 makeover, as well as The Times-Picayune's high school prep sports staff and its music reporting staff.

The merged company was named Advance Media Southeast, registered in New Orleans. A facility to design and produce the pages of The Times-Picayune and four newspapers in Alabama and Mississippi—The Birmingham News, the Mobile Press-Register, The Huntsville Times, and The Mississippi Press in Pascagoula—was opened in January 2016 in a former suburban bureau of The Times-Picayune in Metairie, emptying the Howard Avenue building of the remaining staff. The Metairie building also houses Advance Central Services Southeast, formed from the combined Advance Central Services units in Louisiana and Alabama. Production of another Advance newspaper, The Oregonian, was moved to the Metairie location in late 2016.

=== 2019 acquisition ===
On May 2, 2019, Advance Publications announced that The Times-Picayune had been sold to Georges Media, owner of The Advocate. The new owners stated that both papers would be folded into a single operation by June 2019 and that the NOLA.com brand would be maintained for the combined newspaper's digital operations. A filing required under the WARN Act stated that the entire staff of the Times-Picayune had been laid off, resulting in a loss of 161 jobs, including 65 journalists. The merged paper initially re-hired 10 of those journalists, and about 12 other employees.

The paper, carrying the nameplates of both The Times-Picayune and The New Orleans Advocate, began publication on July 1.

== The Times-Picayune | The New Orleans Advocate online ==
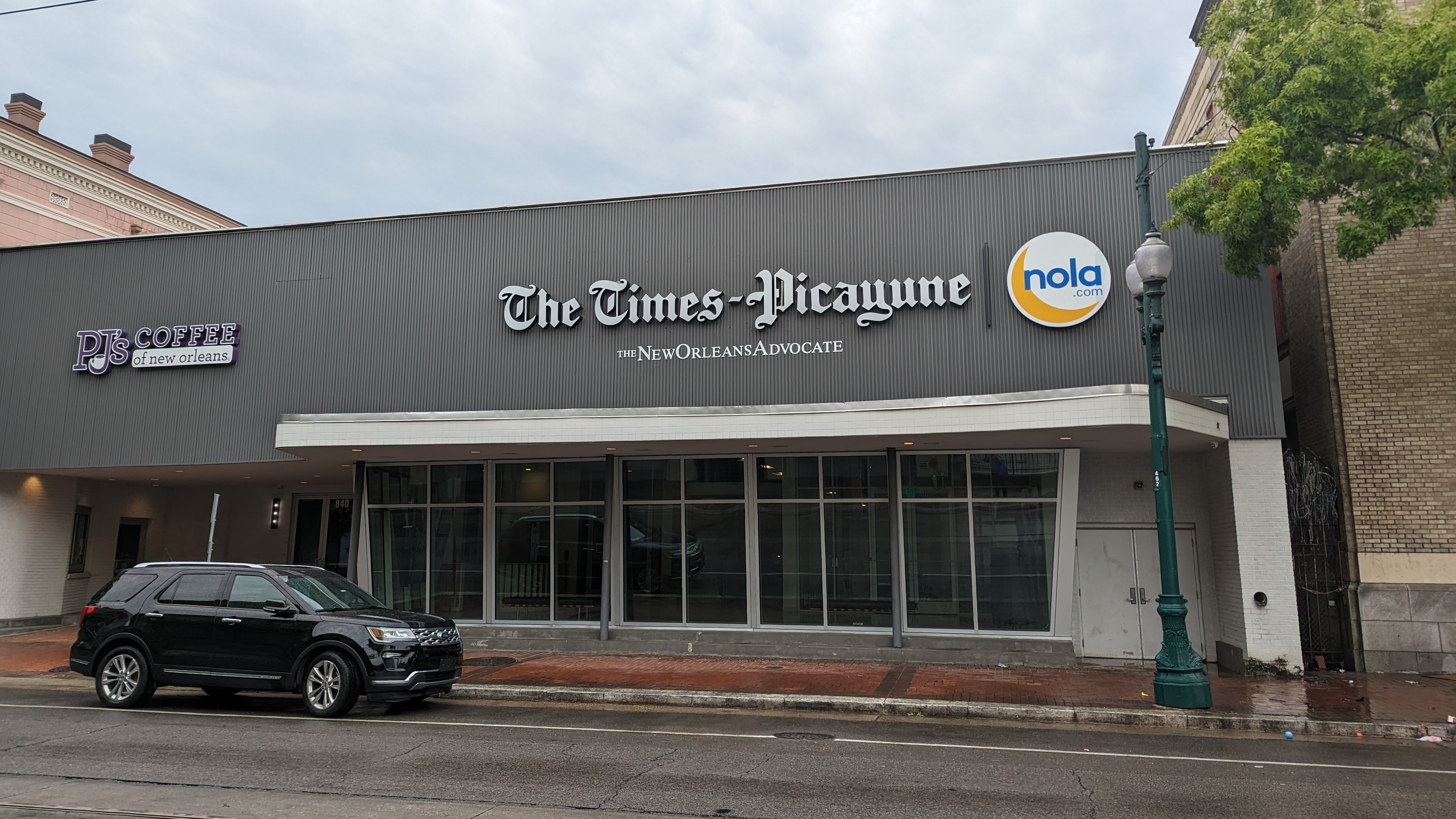
Headquarters

The Times-Picayune's first foray onto the internet came in 1995, with the www.NewOrleans.net website. Among the website's features was the "Bourbocam", placed in the window of a French Quarter bar to broadcast images of Bourbon Street. During the 1996 Mardi Gras, it was one of the first internet webcams to carry a live news event.

In early 1998, that site was superseded by www.nolalive.com, launched by Advance Publications. The site's format was similar to other websites launched in connection with Advance newspapers in New Jersey; Cleveland, Ohio; Michigan; Oregon; and Alabama. Although nolalive.com was affiliated with The Times-Picayune and posted content created by the T-P newsroom, it was operated independently, and it also hosted blogs and forums. In early 2001, the site was renamed NOLA.com.

After a management change at NOLA.com in February 2009, content on the website more closely reflected that of The Times-Picayune. Articles written for the newspaper were posted to the website using the Movable Type content management system. In October 2018, the paper switched from Movable Type to Arc, the content management system created by developers at the Washington Post.

Led by Advance, the site underwent several redesigns over the years. On May 8, 2012, the site debuted its most dramatic redesign by Mule Design Studio of San Francisco. With bright yellow accents, the design echoed that of Advance's bellwether site in Michigan, mlive.com. Following complaints from the public, NOLA.com developed a toned-down palette and new typography. However, the concept – a continually updated "river" of combined news, sports, and entertainment content – remained the same.

After the October 1, 2012, launch of NOLA Media Group, the publication workflow of the newspaper and website was reversed. All staff-produced content is published first to NOLA.com; content was harvested from the website for publication in the printed Times-Picayune.

NOLA.com also offers apps for mobile and tablet users; The Times-Picayune | The New Orleans Advocate offers subscribers an e-edition only.

== Notable people ==
The writers William Faulkner and O. Henry worked for The Times-Picayune. The Louisiana historian Sue Eakin was formerly a Times-Picayune columnist. Bill Minor headed the paper's news bureau in Jackson, Mississippi from 1946 until it closed in 1976. A weekly political column is penned by Robert "Bob" Mann, a Democrat who holds the Douglas Manship Chair of Journalism at Louisiana State University in Baton Rouge.

The Times-Picayune was the longtime journalistic home of British-American satiric columnist James Gill, although he moved to The Advocate in 2013, along with many former Times-Picayune editorial staffers. For more than a decade, The Times-Picayune was also the newspaper home of Lolis Eric Elie, who wrote a thrice-weekly metro column before he went on to write for television, most notably HBO's Treme and AMC's Hell on Wheels.

Already widely known, the journalist and television commentator Iris Kelso joined The Times-Picayune in 1979. She had been particularly known for her coverage of the civil rights movement.

== Editorial stance ==
The Times-Picayune endorsed George W. Bush for President in 2000, but endorsed no Presidential candidate in 2004. In 2008 and 2012, the paper endorsed Democrat Barack Obama for President. It endorsed Democratic Party candidate Hillary Clinton in 2016. In gubernatorial contests it endorsed Mike Foster, Bobby Jindal, and David Vitter. In the mayoral race of 2006, The Times-Picayune endorsed right-leaning Democrat Ron Forman in the primary election and Lieutenant Governor Mitch Landrieu in the runoff.

The Picayune endorsed Governor candidate Edwin Washington Edwards in 1971 and 1975. Still, it went against him in 1983 (endorsing incumbent David C. Treen), 1987 (endorsing challenger and eventual winner Buddy Roemer), and 1991 (endorsed Roemer in the primary, but switched to Edwards in the general election due to Edwards' opponent being former Ku Klux Klan Grand Wizard David Duke). The T-P also stung Edwards in 1979 even though he was barred from running for a third term, refusing to endorse Edwards' hand-picked candidate, Louis Lambert, in favor of Treen in the primary and general elections.

=== Journalism prizes and awards ===
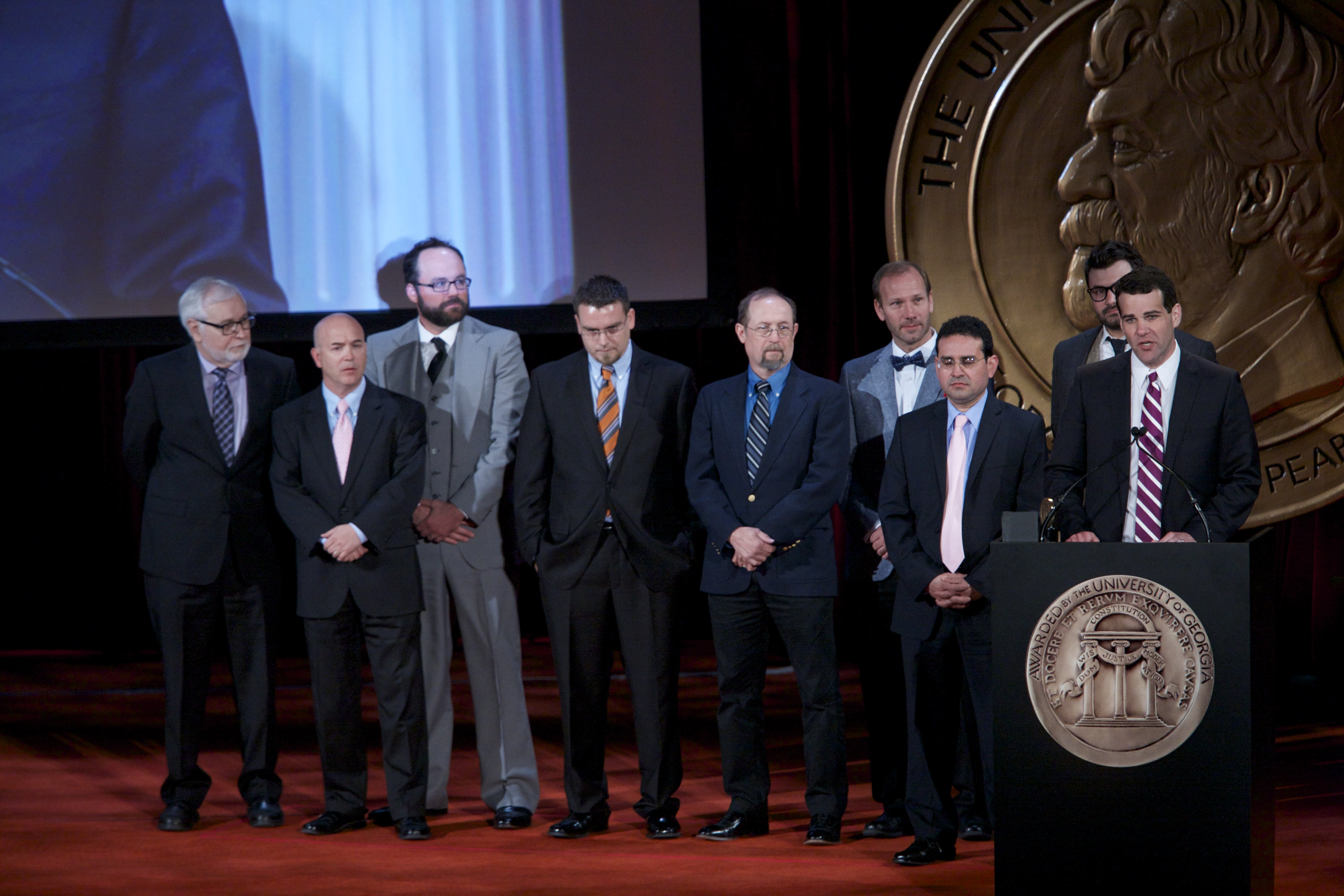
Lee Zurik, joined by WVUE-DT and The Times-Picayune | The New Orleans Advocate, accepts a Peabody Award

Staffers of The Times-Picayune after the presentation of the Pulitzer Prize for Public Service for their work during Hurricane Katrina. May 22, 2006.

The Times-Picayune was awarded a 1997 Pulitzer Prize for a series analyzing the threatened global fish supply; that same year, staff cartoonist Walt Handelsman was awarded the Pulitzer Prize for Editorial Cartooning.

The Times-Picayune shared the 2006 Pulitzer Prize for public service coverage of Hurricane Katrina with The Sun Herald in similarly affected Biloxi, Mississippi. In addition, staff reporters Doug MacCash, Manuel Torres, Trymaine Lee, and Mark Schleifstein were awarded a Pulitzer Prize for breaking news reporting. This award marked the first Pulitzer given for exclusively online journalism.

For its coverage of Hurricane Katrina, The Times-Picayune also received the 2005 George Polk Award for Metropolitan Reporting.

Former Times-Picayune editorial cartoonist Mike Luckovich won the Pulitzer for his cartoons in The Atlanta Journal-Constitution, some of which were also featured in New Orleans Magazine.

=== Loving Cup Award ===
Since 1901, The Times-Picayune | The New Orleans Advocate has annually awarded a Loving cup to individuals who have contributed to improving life in the New Orleans area through civic, cultural, social, or religious activities. Representative awardees include: Eleanor McMain, Albert W. Dent, Edgar B. Stern Sr, Scott Cowen, Gary Solomon Sr., Millie Charles, Mark Surprenant, Leah Chase, Norman Francis, Tommy Cvitanovich, Edith Rosenwald Stern, and Bill Goldring.

=== Ongoing criticism of FEMA ===
Soon after The Times-Picayune was able to restart publication following Hurricane Katrina, the newspaper printed a strongly worded open letter to President George W. Bush in its September 4, 2005, edition, criticizing him for the federal government's response to the disaster, and calling for the firing of Federal Emergency Management Agency (FEMA) chief Michael D. Brown. Brown tendered his resignation eight days later.

The Times-Picayune long continued to editorialize on FEMA. A searing editorial on April 18, 2009, lambasted FEMA and labeled "insulting" the alleged "attitude" of its spokesman Andrew Thomas toward people who were cash-strapped after the evacuation from Hurricane Gustav, which, in the meantime, had become part of the melange of problems associated with hurricanes and governmental agencies. A second editorial on the same day blasted the State of Louisiana's Road Home program and its contractor ICF.

The post-Katrina experience affected the paper's staff. On August 8, 2006, staff photographer John McCusker was arrested and hospitalized after he led police on a high-speed chase and then used his vehicle as a weapon, apparently hoping that they would kill him. McCusker was released from the hospital by mid-August, saying he could not recall the incident at all, which was apparently sparked by the failure to receive an insurance settlement for his damaged house. On December 13, 2007, Judge Camille Buras reduced the charges against McCusker to misdemeanors. The episode led to establishing a support fund for McCusker and other Times-Picayune staff, which collected some $200,000 in a few days. In October 2006, columnist Chris Rose admitted to seeking treatment for clinical depression after a year of "crying jags" and other emotionally isolating behavior.

== See also ==
- List of newspapers in Louisiana
