= Valarie McCall =

American politician

- Born: September 25, 1972 (age 53); Cleveland, Ohio, United States
- Education: Cleveland State University
- Occupations: Chief of Communications, Government & International Affairs
- Years active: 1995–present
- Organization: City of Cleveland
- Known for: Chief of Communications, Government & International Affairs

Valarie McCall, born Valarie J. McCall, is the Chief of Communications, Government & International Affairs for the City of Cleveland, Ohio. She is perhaps best known for being the youngest City Clerk and Clerk of Council in the history of the city of Cleveland.

== Early life ==
McCall was born in Cleveland, Ohio. She grew up in the Glenville neighborhood. She was raised by her grandmother on E. 105th St.

McCall initially envisioned a life in law, and attended the Martin Luther King Law and Public Service Magnet High School in the Hough neighborhood.

== Personal life ==
In 1995, McCall earned her Bachelor's of Art in social work from Cleveland State University. McCall worked at McDonald's to pay her tuition.

In 1997, McCall earned her Master's in Public Administration (MPA).

On 12 May 2012, McCall received an Honorary Doctorate Degree, a Doctor of Public Service honoris causa (with all Rights, Privileges and Honors).

== Career ==
Ms. McCall previously worked at the Templum House for battered women and as a social worker for Cuyahoga County's Department of Children and Family Services.

After McCall purchased a home in Cleveland's Ward 5, she began attending community meetings. At one of these meetings, she was introduced to then-Councilman for Ward 5, Frank Jackson, who encouraged to work at Midtown Cleveland Inc., "a community development organization that focuses on developing the two square miles between downtown Cleveland and University Circle."

McCall served as region manager for the Cleveland Industrial Retention Initiative.

In 1999, McCall was appointed by former Cleveland mayor Michael White to serve as the Enterprise Zone's fourth director. McCall previously served the City of Cleveland as Director of the Empowerment Zone under the Department of Economic Development. In this position, McCall managed a $200 million budget, oversaw the distribution of funds for job training and placement initiatives, as well as the direct lending programs to businesses in four neighborhoods.

In 2002, she became the youngest Clerk of Council in Cleveland's history.

In 2006, McCall became the first person to be named the Chief of Government & International Affairs for the City of Cleveland. McCall currently serves as the Chief of Government Affairs to Mayor Jackson. In this position, McCall serves as the "Administration’s primary liaison to local and state governments, and all federal and international agencies and organizations ... oversee[ing] and administers the Jackson Administration’s appointments to internal and external boards and commissions ... [serves as the] primary representative to several national organizations, including, but not limited to: the United States Conference of Mayors; National Conference of Black Mayors; National League of Cities and the National Black Caucus of Local and Elected Officials, [and] assisting Mayor Jackson with the implementation of his policy initiatives designed to promote regional growth and cooperation, both nationally and internationally." McCall also serves on the boards of several organizations, including Opera Cleveland and the Rock & Roll Hall of Fame and Museum; represents the mayor on such boards as the Northeast Ohio Mayors & Managers Association.

McCall also serves as the Mayor's representative to the Ohio Municipal League's Board, the Board of the Northeast Ohio Areawide Coordinating Agency (Five County Metropolitan Planning Organization), and Cuyahoga County Mayor's and Managers Association and the Northeast Ohio Mayors & Managers Association, the Executive Committees of both the Cuyahoga County & Ohio Democratic Parties, with a recent appointment to the Democratic National Committee. In addition, McCall serves on the Maxine Goodman Levin College of Urban Affairs Visiting Committee, the Government Affairs Committees of the United Way of Cleveland and the Center for Families & Children and has previously served as a member of the advisory board of Cleveland State University's Center for Nonprofit Policy & Practice.

Since 2006, McCall has been a board member of the Greater Cleveland Regional Transit Authority (RTA).

In October 2015, McCall was elected Chair of the American Public Transportation Association (APTA) Board of Directors.

McCall served as Chair of the City of Cleveland's RNC 2016 Special Events Committee and board member of Cleveland 2016 Inc., the host committee for the 2016 Republican National Convention.

McCall was the first African-American female president of the Northeast Ohio Area Coordinating Agency (NOACA).

She was also the host of Government Affairs: A Closer Look, a public affairs television show about Cleveland area community issues.

On 19 June 2018, after McCall submitted a letter of interest to the RTA requesting to be considered for president or vice president, she withdrew her nomination, stating, “I think we’re at a situation of mistrust -- mistrust of one another at the board level, mistrust of us with our own respective leadership and executive staff and we should not be there.” As a result, Republican mayor of Westlake Dennis M. Clogh ran unopposed and secured the nomination with a vote of 8–0.

=== Controversies ===
==== Gay Games ====
McCall had been instrumental in bringing the Gay Games to Cleveland. She was part of a delegation from Cleveland that attended the 2010 Gay Games in Cologne, Germany.

In 2009, the Cleveland Synergy Foundation (CSF) had been awarded the Gay Games IX license by the Federation of Gay Games (FGG). In 2010, the FGG terminated the license, claiming that the CSF failed to document the requisite information in a timely manner, and designated the Cleveland Special Events Corporation as the new host. In September 2010, the CSF sued several of the entities involved, and Valarie McCall, to retain the rights to the events. CSF alleged that McCall "two-faced Synergy" by sitting on its board while colluding with FGG to undermine CSF to get the local group removed from the project. The lawsuit also alleged that McCall attempted to "terminate the license agreement without proper notice and/or legal and factual justification."

The City of Cleveland agreed to pay the Cleveland Synergy Foundation $475,000.00. In the settlement agreement, the city of Cleveland did not admit any liability or wrongdoing.

==== Title ====
On 12 May 2012, McCall received an Honorary Doctorate degree, Shortly after the honorary degree was conferred, Cleveland.com ran a news story indicating that Mayor Jackson's Chief of Governmental Affairs was signing her e-mails using the name "Dr. Valarie J. McCall". The article reported on the infrequency in which a name change accompanies the acquisition of an honorary degree, and found e-mail recipients and constituents disapproved of her new title.

==== RTA payments ====
On 8 June 2018, an article was published to Cleveland.com detailing a payment dispute between Valarie McCall and the Greater Cleveland Regional Transit Authority. The dispute originated when McCall requested compensation from the RTA in 2014. According to RTA bylaws, "board members are entitled to a $400 a month stipend for their service"; however, when appointed by the Mayor, Jackson instructed the RTA that McCall was not to be compensated. In the 2014 request, McCall requested she receive compensation for the work she put in at the RTA (an amount she has received to date in excess of $56,400.00), and to be paid retroactively for the years of back pay she declined, which amounted to $35,600.00 before taxes.

In 2014, RTA General Manager Joe Calabrese and then-board President George Dixon approved McCall's. However, the dispute originated from the explanation provided by McCall pertaining to her motivation for seeking a stipend after 8 years of continuous declinations. McCall's explanation for requesting the company indicated that she has been consistently approached by RTA staff, who "encouraged her to take the money to be consistent with other board members and to avoid a potential audit investigation. However, the RTA disputed McCall's recount of events, claiming that RTA officials did not tell McCall that she had to take the money, that McCall's declining payment would not trigger an audit investigation, and cited a portion of its administrative code that states board members are allowed to decline compensation.

On 6 September 2018, Fox 8 News reported that the RTA had ceased paying two of its board members and already had an investigation underway pertaining to the legality of the payments to members of the board. In the interview with Ohio Attorney General Mike DeWine stated that, "Public employees, clearly under Ohio law, cannot be paid by two different public entities for the same hours. It's kind of a basic concept; you can't get double pay. Basically, you clock out of one job, and go to the other. And that's probably not a problem, because you're not getting paid, you know, double. But if you're getting paid double, it's wrong, it's against the law. Because McCall is a public employee who was not elected to her position, she was one of the two RTA board members who stopped receiving payments; the RTA planned to withhold these two members' stipends "until the matter is resolved".

On 9 November 2018, an article published to Cleveland.com reported that the Cuyahoga County Prosecutor's Office served subpoenas to the RTA to obtain records on former high-level officials and one of the current board members. A subpoena served on 7 September 2018 requested records related McCall's request to be compensated as other board members on the RTA board.
