= Victoria Newhouse =

American architectural historian

Victoria Newhouse (née Victoria Carrington Benedict) is an American architectural historian. She founded the Architectural History Foundation, a nonprofit scholarly book publisher, and is a frequent author on architecture-related subjects. She has written for major architecture journals and newspapers.

Newhouse grew up in New York City and graduated from Bryn Mawr College in 1959, having majored in French. She moved to Paris and married French count Régis de Ramel there. The two later divorced, and Newhouse returned to New York. She began working in architecture as the architecture editor for George Braziller, Inc., and began the Architectural History Foundation in 1977, operating it until 1994. Newhouse wrote her first book in 1989 and has published four more since then.

== Early life ==
Victoria Newhouse was raised in Manhattan, New York City; her parents were John C. Benedict, a retired investment banker, and an English mother. She graduated from the Brearley School, an elite private school. She subsequently attended Bryn Mawr College, graduating in 1959. There she majored in French, and was a magna cum laude graduate. After graduation, she moved to Paris, where she met her first husband, French count Régis de Ramel.

== Career ==
One of Newhouse's early jobs was as the architecture editor for George Braziller, beginning in the mid-1960s. Braziller had fired his prior editor and gave her the job. She had no knowledge of architecture, though she returned to school to learn. She earned a master's degree in architectural history at Columbia University.

Newhouse established the Architectural History Foundation, a nonprofit scholarly book publisher, in 1977. The foundation aimed to support books that would otherwise be unpublished, and to raise the quality of works about architecture. Newhouse closed the foundation in 1994, stating that its mission had been fulfilled.

Newhouse first wrote a book on Wallace K. Harrison, in 1989.

Victoria Newhouse's works have a variety of subjects over time periods and regions, though she analyzes architecture in each of her works by referencing buildings' structural, social, and political aspects.

Newhouse was a judge for the Pritzker Prize, "architecture's highest honor", for three years from 2006 to 2008. She writes and lectures about museums, writing articles for The New York Times, Architectural Record, Architectural Digest, and ARTnews.

== Personal life ==
She married a French count, Régis de Ramel, obtaining the name Victoria Carrington Benedict de Ramel. The marriage ended in divorce, with no children. On April 13, 1973, she married Samuel Irving Newhouse Jr., a man ten years her elder. He died on October 1, 2017, at the age of 89. The couple had no children, though he had three from a prior marriage, and Victoria and Samuel acquired a pug named Nero. The dog died and was replaced by Cicero, in 1998.

Newhouse was raised Episcopal, though she became a devout Catholic later in life, with a strong interest in religions.

She has been a long-term art collector and museum patron. She and her husband had an apartment at the UN Plaza, as well as homes in Bellport and Palm Beach. The homes are decorated with the family's large art collection.

== Bibliography ==
- Wallace K. Harrison, Architect (1989)
- Towards a New Museum (1998, expanded edition 2006)
- Art and the Power of Placement (2005)
- Site and Sound: The Architecture and Acoustics of New Opera Houses and Concert Halls (2012)
- Chaos and Culture: Renzo Piano Building Workshop and the Stavros Niarchos Foundation Cultural Center in Athens (2017)
- Newhouse, Victoria & Alex Pisha (2021). Parks of the 21st century : reinvented landscapes, reclaimed territories. New York: Rizzoli. (Note: Briefly reviewed in the May 23, 2022 issue of The New Yorker, p.61.)

———————

== See also ==
- List of American historians
- List of American print journalists
- List of people from New York City
