= Advance Digital =

US company

- Type: Subsidiary
- Founded: 1996
- Headquarters: Jersey City, New Jersey, United States
- Owner: Advance Publications
- Parent: Advance Local
- Website: www.advancedigital.com

Advance Digital provides sales and content strategy, product development and technology to the Advance Local media group, part of Advance Publications. Advance Publications is an American media company owned by the descendants of Samuel Irving Newhouse, Sr.

Advance Local, established in 2010, operates 12 local news and information websites affiliated to more than 30 newspapers. Its headquarters are at 1 World Trade Center in New York, New York. Advance Digital is headquartered at Jersey City, New Jersey.

The unit's Advance Digital name was established December 16, 2011; its previous name was Advance Internet. Its president is Peter Weinberger

Advance Local web sites provide local information such as breaking news, local sports, travel destinations, weather, dining, bar guides and health and fitness.

== Web sites ==
- al.com
- cleveland.com
- gulflive.com
- lehighvalleylive.com
- MardiGras.com
- MassLive.com
- MLive.com
- NJ.com
- OregonLive.com
- PennLive.com
- SILive.com
- syracuse.com
