= Puss in Boots: The Three Diablos =

- DVD cover
- Directed by: Raman Hui
- Screenplay by: Tom Wheeler
- Produced by: Gina Shay
- Starring: Antonio Banderas; Gilles Marini; Charlotte Newhouse; Chris Miller; Walt Dohrn; Bret Marnell; Miles Christopher Baksi; Nina Zoe Baksi; Guillaume Aretos
- Edited by: Bret Marnell
- Music by: Matthew Margeson; Henry Jackman
- Production company: DreamWorks Animation
- Distributed by: Paramount Home Media Distribution
- Release date: February 24, 2012
- Running time: 13 minutes
- Country: United States
- Language: English

Puss in Boots: The Three Diablos is a 2012 American animated short adventure comedy film. It was directed by Raman Hui and features Antonio Banderas as the voice of the title character. The short was released on February 24, 2012, attached as a bonus feature to the Puss in Boots DVD and Blu-ray (3D) release. The short takes place after the events of the first film and tells a story of Puss in Boots on a mission to recover a princess' stolen ruby from the notorious French thief the Whisperer. Reluctantly accompanied by three cute little kittens called the Three Diablos, Puss must tame them before they endanger the mission.

== Plot ==
Some time after the Golden Goose incident, Puss in Boots is riding his horse through the desert contemplating the crossroads he found himself at when he is captured by Italian knights. He is then taken to Princess Alessandra Belagomba, who tells him that the "Heart of Fire" Ruby, the crown jewel of her kingdom, was stolen by a French thief called "the Whisperer", and wants to hire him to bring it back. The Princess takes Puss to the Whisperer’s three henchmen, who were captured during the robbery, and they turn out to be kittens, whom are referred as "Diablos". Though Puss cannot believe that such innocent creatures could be thieves, the Princess and her guards are terrified of them. The Diablos agree to help Puss on the premise that they will be free if they return the ruby.

When Puss takes the Diablos to the desert, they quickly turn on him, revealing their backstabbing nature, and bury him alive. Puss later escapes and recaptures the Diablos using his wide eyes against theirs. That night, he talks about sending them back to jail for double-crossing him, but he learns that they have no family and are orphans like him. He then sympathetically tells them how he also knows it is tough growing up not knowing whom to trust and being betrayed, making an example of how Humpty led him down the wrong path, just as the Whisperer has done to them. Puss then decides to point the Diablos in the right direction and trains them how to fight and play with them, becoming friends. He also gives them names: Perla, because she is one of a kind, Gonzalo, for his scrappy temper, and Sir Timoteo Montenegro the Third, because a title is all he needs.

The next day, the Diablos, turning over a new leaf, show Puss to the Whisperer's secret hideout, and are immediately confronted by the Whisperer himself, who, by his name, has a low voice volume and uses his hat as a megaphone to speak clearly, and he is wearing the Heart as a decoration for his belt. After learning that the Diablos brought Puss to him to recover the heart, the Whisperer is about to punish them for their betrayal, but Puss fights him and lets the Diablos escape. They, however, return to help Puss with what they learned from him and the Whisperer falls into a bottomless pit, with Puss reclaiming the Heart in the process. Puss then returns the Heart to the Princess and is rewarded with gold, and he gives her the Diablos as her new personal bodyguards. They then say their goodbyes and the guards slam the doors before Puss can finish his goodbye.

== Voice cast ==
- Antonio Banderas as Puss in Boots
- Gilles Marini as Captain of the Guard / Paolo the Squire
- Charlotte Newhouse as Princess Alessandra Bellagamba
- Chris Miller as Food Prisoner
- Walt Dohrn as Water Prisoner
- Bret Marnell as Toilet Paper Prisoner
- Miles Christopher Bakshi as Gonzalo / Sir Timoteo Montenegro the Third
- Nina Zoe Bakshi as Perla
- Guillaume Aretos as Le Chuchoteur the Whisperer

== Release ==
The short film was released with Puss in Boots DVD and Blu-ray on February 24, 2012.

== Reception ==
Bret Marnell was nominated for Outstanding Achievement, Editorial in an Animated Television or other Broadcast Venue Production for his work on Puss in Boots: Three Diablos at the 40th Annual Annie Awards.
