= The Trentonian =

Daily newspaper in Trenton, New Jersey, United States

Coordinates: 40.226134°N 74.754282°W

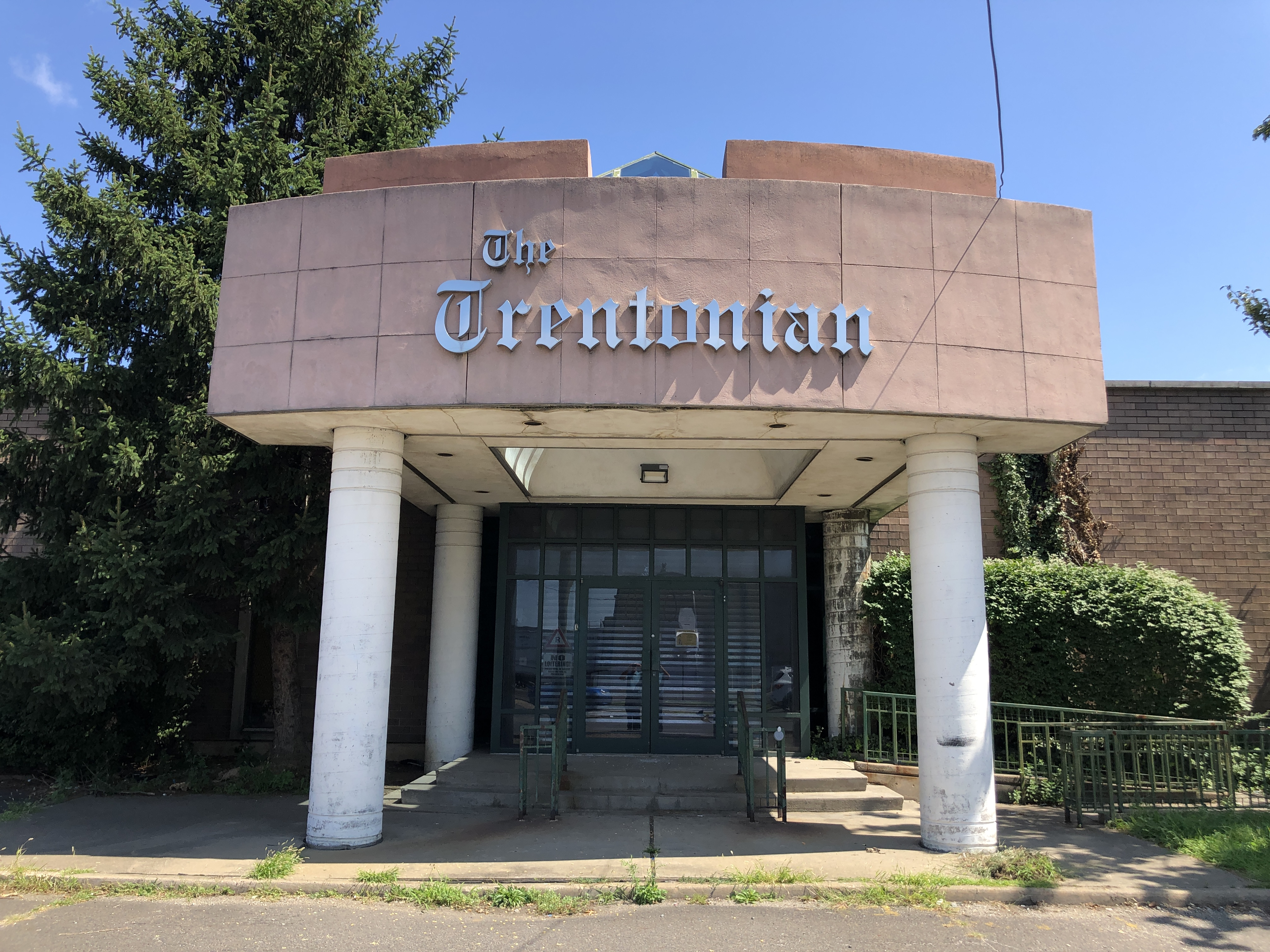
- Former headquarters of the Trentonian, now occupied by Summit Gypsum Supply
- Type: Daily newspaper
- Format: Tabloid
- Owner: Digital First Media
- Publisher: Edward S. Condra
- Founded: 1945
- Language: American English
- Country: United States
- Circulation: 7,837 Daily; 6,869 Sunday (as of 2020)
- ISSN: 1064-3567
- OCLC number: 15342162
- Website: www.trentonian.com

The Trentonian is a daily newspaper serving Trenton, New Jersey, USA, and the surrounding Mercer County community. The paper in 2020 has a daily circulation of under 8,000 and a Sunday circulation of under 7,000. As of August 2020, it was ranked fourteenth in total circulation among newspapers in New Jersey.

== History ==
The paper is owned by Digital First Media, a media company headquartered in Denver, Colorado, specializing in newspaper publishing, which owns 75 daily and several hundred non-daily newspapers in the United States. DFM was formed as a merger between Media News Group (MNG) and Journal Register Company (JRC).

In November 2008, DFM announced that some of its newspapers, including The Trentonian, were being put up for sale. The newspaper's daily price increased 43 percent, from 35 cents to 50 cents. Also, the company announced that The Trentonian would no longer be printed in Trenton beginning in January 2009. It will be printed at a JRC-owned facility in Exton, Pennsylvania and delivered to Trenton.

The Trentonian was known as a feisty, gritty tabloid from its start in 1945 when 40 members of the International Typographical Union broke away from the Trenton Times to start their paper.

When The Washington Post Company bought the Times in 1975, Katharine Graham vowed to make Trenton a one-paper town. She reportedly would later admit that Trenton was her "Vietnam."

The Trentonian generated community outrage and criticism when it published a front-page headline, “Roasted Nuts!” about a fire at a state institution housing developmentally disabled patients.

The book Tabloid From Hell details what the author considers to be the decline of The Trentonian, with much of the blame directed at Robert M. Jelenic, JRC's former CEO, whom the author says spent too much time on discipline and trivial matters, not enough on quality journalism. A Mary Walton interview in American Journalism Review was also critical of Jelenic.

== Awards and recognition ==
The 1974 Pulitzer Prize for Editorial Writing was awarded to F. Gilman Spencer, editor of The Trentonian, "for his courageous campaign to focus public attention on scandals in New Jersey's state government".
