= Idiotsitter =

American sitcom

- Created by: Jillian Bell; Charlotte Newhouse
- Starring: Jillian Bell; Charlotte Newhouse; Stephen Root; Elizabeth De Razzo; Jennifer Elise Cox
- Opening theme: "2 Gangsta 4 TV" by Spank
- Country of origin: United States
- Original language: English
- No. of seasons: 2
- No. of episodes: 17 + 6 webisodes

Production
- Running time: 6 minutes (web series); 22 minutes (TV series)
- Production companies: Take a Train; 3 Arts Entertainment; Haven Entertainment; Comedy Partners

Original release
- Network: Comedy Central; CC: Studios
- Release: February 26 – March 26, 2014
- Release: January 14, 2016 – June 17, 2017

Idiotsitter is an American sitcom that premiered in the form of a web series on Comedy Central's CC: Studios on February 26, 2014, before being picked up for a run on television that premiered on Comedy Central on January 14, 2016. The series was created by Jillian Bell and Charlotte Newhouse, who star as Gene Russell (Bell) and Billie Brown (Newhouse), the series leads.

On June 13, 2016, Idiotsitter was initially renewed for a ten-episode second season, featuring Gene and Billie at a college campus, before being reduced to seven episodes, airing in a two-part marathon on June 10 and 17, 2017 on Comedy Central.

== Synopsis ==
Idiotsitter follows Billie, a young strapped-for-cash woman who, in order to make some quick money, takes a job working as a nanny for a rich family in Los Angeles. She discovers that the position was a cover-up for the real job of supervisor and teacher to a full-grown woman-child named Gene, who is under house arrest.

== Development and production ==
In November 2013, Idiotsitter was announced as a part of a development slate through Comedy Central's digital production studio, CC: Studios. The web series ran for six episodes in early 2014 before being picked up to series on Comedy Central in June 2014. Season one debuted on January 14, 2016. Jennifer Elise Cox replaced Angela Little in the role of Tanzy Russell for the TV series.

== Cast ==
- Jillian Bell as Genevieve "Gene" Russell
- Charlotte Newhouse as Wilhelmina "Billie" Brown
- Stephen Root as Kent Russell (season 1, recurring season 2)
- Elizabeth De Razzo as Joy (season 1)
- Jennifer Elise Cox as Tanzy Russell (season 1)

=== Recurring ===
- Steve Berg as Chet/Bret
- Ryan Gaul as McCallister Dobbs

== Episodes ==
=== Web series (2014) ===
No.	Title	Original release date
1	"The Interview"	February 26, 2014
2	"Sundae Bloody Sunday"	February 26, 2014
After Gene refuses to set time aside for tutoring, she is confronted by Billie and the two get into an insult war at the dinner table.
3	"Father/Daughter"	March 5, 2014
Gene fills Billie's room with drugs and pornography in an attempt to get her fired, but Billie proves her innocence and coaches Ken through punishing Gene as a result.
4	"Happy Birthday"	March 12, 2014
Gene and Chet trick Billie into eating a birthday cake full of peyote.
5	"Fight Day"	March 19, 2014
Billie finds herself an unwilling participant in Ocho de Octo, a Russell family tradition in which everyone spends the day beating each other up with therapy bats.
6	"The Ex-Boyfriend"	March 26, 2014
Billie's successful ex-boyfriend asks her to dinner, so she and Gene switch roles to make Billie seem rich and impressive.

=== Season 1 (2016) ===
No.	Title	Directed by	Written by	Original release date	US viewers (millions)
1	"Pilot"	Jeff Tomsic	Jillian Bell & Charlotte Newhouse	December 28, 2015 (online); January 14, 2016 (Comedy Central)	0.479
Uptight Harvard graduate Billie interviews for a nanny job for a rich couple, Kent and Tanzy Russell, who live in a Los Angeles mansion. She is surprised to learn that Gene, the "7-year-old" that she has been employed to watch, is actually Kent's young adult daughter who is wearing an ankle monitor and on house arrest. Gene is immature, stupid, reckless and parties a lot. Kent and Tanzy leave, saying that they are going to Japan for three days. Billie suggests to Gene that she invite a couple of friends over, but Gene throws a party. Gene and her friend Chet spike Billie's drink with rohypnol and horse tranquillizer. When Billie regains consciousness, she leaves. Gene persuades her to return.
2	"Book Report"	Nick Jasenovec	Jillian Bell & Charlotte Newhouse	January 21, 2016	0.457
When she is forced to do schoolwork that includes reading books rather than films based on them, Gene plots to get rid of Billie.
3	"Funeral"	Jeff Tomsic	Justin Nowell & Joe Wengert	January 28, 2016	0.339
Gene is granted a four-hour break from her house arrest to attend Chet's funeral and is taken there by Billie. Due to Billie's fear of funerals, she gets drunk. Straight after the burial, Gene meets a woman who looks very similar to Chet.
4	"Hos Before Bros"	Jeff Tomsic	Justin Nowell & Joe Wengert	February 4, 2016	0.373
When a sexy football player shows up at the house, Gene flirts shamelessly while Billie struggles to keep her cool. Guest starring Channing Tatum.
5	"Fumigation"	Jeff Tomsic	Justin Noble	February 11, 2016	0.332
While the mansion undergoes fumigation, Billie and Gene camp out in the guest house. Guest starring Chris Klein
6	"Mother's Day"	Nick Jasenovec	Justin Nowell	February 18, 2016	0.319
Gene's mother arrives at the house, making Ken emotional; Billie goes on a date with a dental hygienist who has a surprising wild side.
7	"GED Prom"	Jeff Tomsic	Joe Wengert & Jess Lacher	February 25, 2016	0.379
Gene plans a prom for GED students and invites her cyberbully in order to humiliate him in public. Billie's escort is a fellow tutor whose GED student is younger than she imagined. Guest starring Andrew W. K. and Randall Park
8	"Viva La Joy"	Kyle Newacheck	Evan Mann & Gareth Reynolds	March 3, 2016	0.302
After Billie accidentally gets Joy fired, she and Gene stage a series of civil protests in order to convince Kent to rehire her.
9	"Ex-Boyfriend"	Christian Hoffman	Jillian Bell & Charlotte Newhouse	March 10, 2016	0.311
When Billie's obnoxious ex-boyfriend comes over for dinner, Gene poses as a butler in an attempt to convince him that Billie has been prospering since their breakup.
10	"Finale"	Jeff Tomsic	Jillian Bell & Charlotte Newhouse	March 17, 2016	0.310
In the Season 1 finale, Gene takes her GED, while Billie aims for her dream of being a college professor.

=== Season 2 (2017) ===
No.	Title	Directed by	Written by	Original release date	US viewers (millions)
1 (11)	"Billie and Gene: The College Years"	Heath Cullens	Jillian Bell & Charlotte Newhouse	June 10, 2017	0.233
Gene and Billie find themselves sharing a college campus, and Gene sets out to make the perfect viral video.
2 (12)	"Better Off Ned"	Heath Cullens	Alison Bennett	June 10, 2017	0.173
When a professor commits suicide, Billie angles to move into his office and Gene befriends his boss.
3 (13)	"Virginity"	Carrie Brownstein	Julieanne Smolinski	June 10, 2017	0.134
When Gene discovers that Billie has never had sex, she vows to help her friend lose her virginity.
4 (14)	"Girls Gone Wild"	Carrie Brownstein	Shelby Fero	June 10, 2017	0.118
Gene and Billie have the campus to themselves when the rest of the students and staff leave for spring break.
5 (15)	"Sports"	Adam Newacheck	Evan Mann & Gareth Reynolds	June 17, 2017	N/A
When the university pressures Billie to pass a star athlete on the fencing team, she's determined to help him earn his grade.
6 (16)	"Rush, Rush"	Adam Newacheck	Jillian Bell & Charlotte Newhouse	June 17, 2017	N/A
Billie becomes the housemother to an eerily tight-knit sorority, and Gene gets involved in a very different side of campus Greek life.
7 (17)	"School's Out"	Alex Buono	Jillian Bell & Charlotte Newhouse	June 17, 2017	N/A
Desperate not to let her college experience end, Gene locks herself in the library with Billie and the Eastwestern faculty to stage a "Clue"-style murder mystery.

== Critical response ==
Idiotsitter has been met with favorable reviews from critics. On Metacritic, it holds a rating of 68/100 based on six reviews. On Rotten Tomatoes, it holds an 88% approval rating, based on eight reviews with an average rating of 7.2/10.
