= Samuel Irving Newhouse Jr. =

American publisher (1927–2017)

- Born: November 8, 1927; New York City, U.S.
- Died: October 1, 2017 (aged 89); New York City, U.S.
- Occupation: Publisher
- Title: Chairman Emeritus, Condé Nast
- Spouses: Jane Franke (m. 1951; div. 1959); Victoria Benedict (m. 1973)
- Children: 3
- Parent(s): Samuel Newhouse Sr. Mitzi Epstein
- Relatives: Donald Newhouse (brother)

Samuel Irving "S.I." Newhouse Jr. (November 8, 1927 – October 1, 2017) was an American heir to a substantial magazine and media business. Together with his brother Donald, he owned Advance Publications, founded by their late father in 1922, whose companies include Condé Nast (publisher of such magazines as Vogue, Vanity Fair, and The New Yorker), dozens of newspapers across the United States (including The Star-Ledger, The Plain Dealer, and The Oregonian), former cable company Bright House Networks, and a controlling stake in Discovery Communications.

== Early life ==
He was the son of Mitzi (née Epstein) and Samuel Irving Newhouse Sr., the founder of Advance Publications. Sam Newhouse Sr. had been the young editor of the Bayonne Times. When he asked the owner of the Times for a raise he had long deserved, he was refused. Sam then quit the Times to become associated with the Staten Island paper that formed the basis of his publication future, the Staten Island Advance and Advance Publications, respectively. Newhouse attended the Horace Mann School in New York City. He later attended Syracuse University, but dropped out and began working at his father's newspapers.

== Career ==
After dropping out of Syracuse University, Newhouse worked for the International News Service in Paris. He served two years in the U.S. Air Force before going to Harrisburg, Pennsylvania to oversee two of his father's daily newspapers. In 1964, he became publisher of the U.S. edition of Vogue and in 1975, he took over as chairman of Condé Nast. In 1985, he purchased The New Yorker.

Prior to his death, he had an estimated net worth of $9.5 billion, and he was ranked the 46th richest American by Forbes in 2014.

Newhouse gave money to charity, including $15 million to Syracuse University in 1962. He was also an art collector, who at one time owned one of the most valuable paintings in the world, a Jackson Pollock drip painting, No. 5, 1948. Newhouse was listed by Art News as among the top 200 art collectors in the world.. In May 2026 another painting from his private collection by Jackson Pollock, No. 7A, 1948 sold for $181m. This was a record for a Pollock painting and the fourth most expensive artwork sold at auction

== Personal life and death ==
Newhouse was Jewish. In 1951, he married Jane Franke, with whom he had three children: Samuel I. Newhouse III, Wynn Newhouse (1954–2010), and Pamela Newhouse Mensch. Franke and Newhouse divorced in 1959, despite disapproval from his parents. In 1973, Newhouse married Victoria Carrington Benedict de Ramel.

In 2006, Newhouse established the Wynn Newhouse Awards, an annual award program that provides grants to artists with disabilities.

Newhouse's grandson, Samuel I. Newhouse IV, appeared in the documentary Born Rich.

Newhouse died on October 1, 2017, at the age of 89.
