= Donald Newhouse =

American businessman (1929–2026)

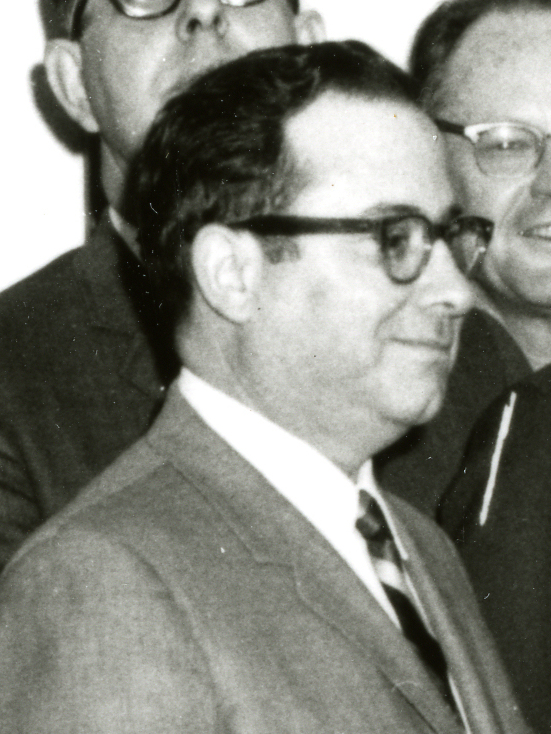
- Newhouse in 1966
- Born: Donald Edward Newhouse; August 5, 1929; New York City, U.S.
- Died: May 26, 2026 (aged 96); Lambertville, New Jersey, U.S.
- Education: Syracuse University
- Occupation: Businessman
- Title: President, Advance Publications
- Spouse: Susan Marley (m. 1955; died 2015)
- Children: 3
- Parent(s): Samuel Irving Newhouse Sr. Mitzi Epstein
- Relatives: Samuel Irving Newhouse Jr. (brother)

Donald Edward Newhouse (August 5, 1929 – May 26, 2026) was an American businessman who owned Advance Publications. It was founded in 1922 by his father, Samuel Irving Newhouse Sr., and its properties include Condé Nast (publisher of such magazines as Vogue, Tatler, Vanity Fair, and The New Yorker), dozens of newspapers across the U.S. (among them The Star-Ledger, The Plain Dealer, and The Oregonian), a stake in cable company Charter Communications, and a stake in Warner Bros. Discovery. According to Forbes in May 2026, he had an estimated net worth of $15.4 billion. He lived in New York City.

== Early life and education ==
Donald Newhouse was born in New York City to a Jewish family, and he was the oldest of eight children. His father, Samuel Irving Newhouse Sr., was born on the Lower East Side of Manhattan and began the family media business. His mother, Mitzi Epstein, was an arts patron and philanthropist who grew up in an upper middle class family on the Upper West Side, the daughter of a silk tie importer. Donald and his brother Samuel (SI) Irving Newhouse Jr went to Horace Mann School in the Bronx. Neither of them graduated. Don boxed and played soccer; Si was the assistant editor of the school's newspaper.

== Philanthropy ==
In January 2020, Newhouse donated $75 million to Syracuse University's S. I. Newhouse School of Public Communications. The communications school is named after his father, Samuel Irving Newhouse Sr. It was announced in March 2021 that Donald Newhouse and his wife Susan were launching a fund at the Association for Frontotemporal Degeneration (AFTD) with a $20 million donation, the largest donation in the charity's history.

== Personal life and death ==
Newhouse married Susan Marley in 1955, just after she had graduated from Wellesley College in Wellesley, Massachusetts and they had three children; sons Steven O. Newhouse (b. 1957) - current chairman and co-president of Advance Publications, Michael Andrew Newhouse - member of the Associated Press board of directors since 2017, and daughter Katherine Irene Newhouse.

The couple's primary residence was in New York City, but they often spent weekends on their farm in New Jersey. They remained married until her death in 2015 of primary progressive aphasia, a different variant of the same rare disorder (frontotemporal dementia) which afflicted his brother, Si Newhouse.

Newhouse was included on The Jerusalem Post's list of the world's 50 richest Jews in 2010. He died from lymphoma at his estate in Lambertville, New Jersey, on May 26, 2026, at the age of 96.
