= The Star-Ledger =

New Jersey newspaper

Coordinates: 40.731512°N 74.178410°W

- The May 24, 2012 front page of The Star-Ledger
- Type: Daily newspaper
- Format: Broadsheet
- Owner: Advance Publications
- Publisher: Richard Vezza
- Editor: Kevin Whitmer
- Founded: 1832
- Language: American English
- Headquarters: 1 Gateway Center Suite 1100; Newark, New Jersey, U.S.
- OCLC number: 10944976
- Website: www.nj.com/starledger/

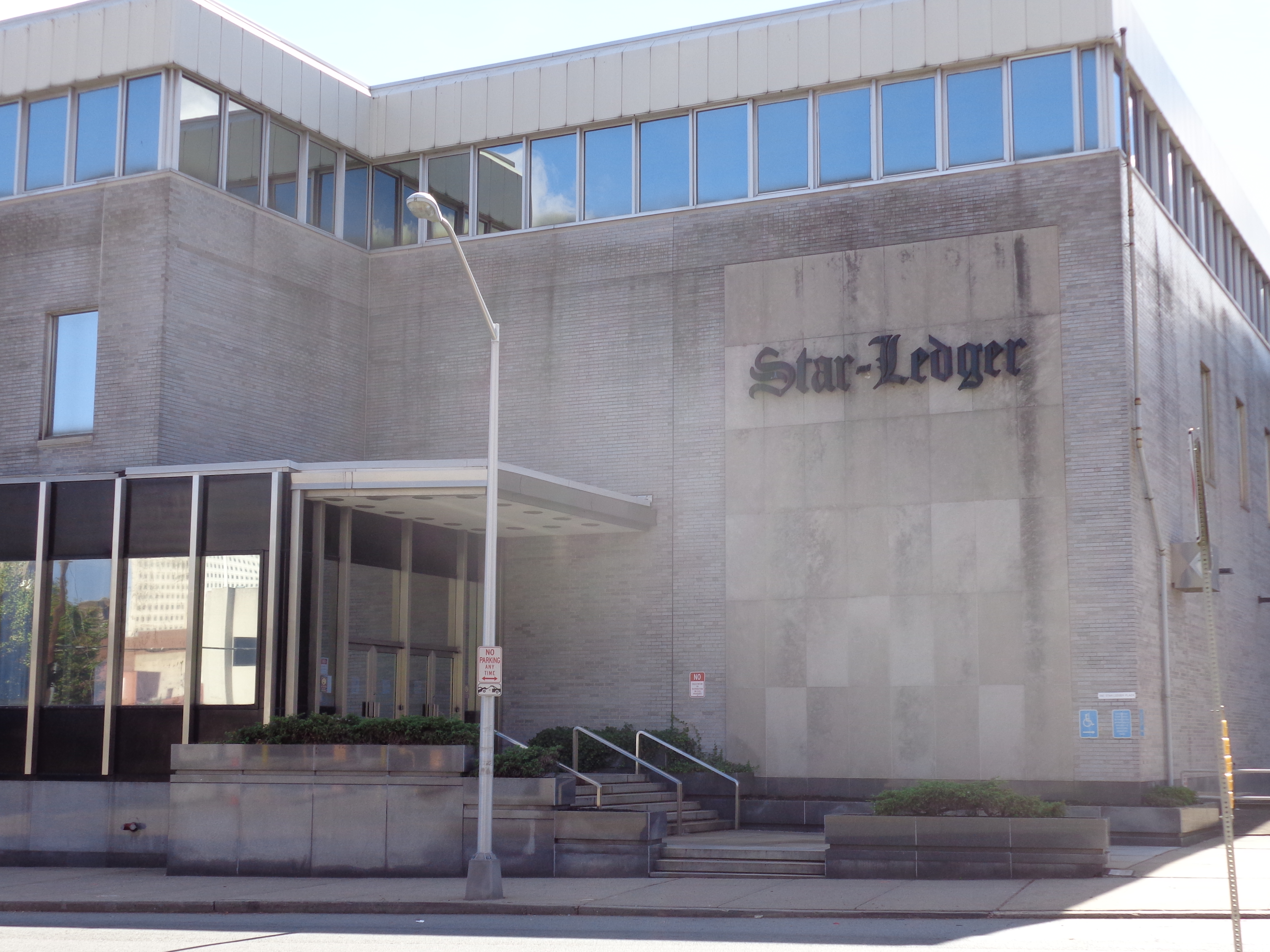
Former headquarters in Newark

The Star-Ledger is a daily broadsheet newspaper based in Newark, New Jersey published beginning in 1832. The newspaper ceased its print side on February 2, 2025, and continues to publish a digital edition.

In 2007, The Star-Ledger's daily circulation was reportedly more than the next two largest New Jersey newspapers combined, and its Sunday circulation was larger than the next three papers combined. In the years following, it suffered great declines in print circulation, to 180,000 daily in 2013, then to 114,000 in 2015.

In July 2013, the paper announced that it would sell its headquarters building in Newark. In the same year, owner Advance Publications announced it was exploring cost-saving changes among its New Jersey properties, but was not considering mergers or changes in publication frequency at any of the newspapers, nor the elimination of home delivery. On February 2, 2025, daily print operation ceased, but online coverage continued.

The Star-Ledger is a sister paper to The Times of Trenton and the South Jersey Times both of which are also owned by Advance Publications, headquartered at One World Trade Center in Lower Manhattan.

== History ==
=== Nineteenth century ===
The Newark Daily Advertiser, founded in 1832, was Newark's first daily newspaper. It subsequently evolved into the Newark Star-Eagle, owned by what eventually became Block Communications.

=== Twentieth century ===
In 1939, S. I. Newhouse bought the Star-Eagle from Block and merged it with the Newark Ledger to become the Newark Star-Ledger. The paper dropped Newark from its masthead sometime in the 1970s, but is still popularly called the Newark Star-Ledger by many residents of New Jersey.

During the 1960s, The Star-Ledger's chief competitor was the Newark Evening News, once the most popular newspaper in New Jersey. In March 1971, the Star-Ledger surpassed the Evening News in daily circulation, because the Newark News was on strike. The Evening News shut down in 1972.

After the Newark Evening News moved to a high-traffic area (with the potential of trapping its delivery trucks in inner-city traffic) the Star-Ledger opened a satellite plant in Piscataway. The Piscataway location offered quick access to Union, Monmouth, Somerset, and Middlesex counties.

The Star-Ledger was the recipient of the Pulitzer Prize for Breaking News Reporting in 2005 for its comprehensive coverage of the resignation of New Jersey Governor Jim McGreevey, after he confessed to adultery with a male lover.

The paper awards the Star-Ledger Trophy each year to the number one high school teams in their respective sport in New Jersey.

=== Twenty-first century ===
In 2005, George Arwady became the publisher of The Star-Ledger. A graduate of Columbia University, Arwady was previously the publisher of the Kalamazoo Gazette in Kalamazoo, Michigan. Having worked closely with the Newhouse family for years, Arwady was asked to move to Newark to oversee a financial revamping of the newspaper.

Due to financial losses, the paper's parent company Advance Publications announced on July 31, 2008 that it would sell the Star-Ledger unless 200 non-union staff voluntarily left under a buyout offer, and its unionized truck drivers and mailers agreed to concessions. On September 16, publisher George Arwady sent employees an email saying that management felt progress had been made on the buyout and concessions from the mailers, but that management is "far from an agreement with the Drivers' union." The email continued:

Since it is doubtful that the Drivers will ratify an agreement by October 8, 2008, we will be sending formal notices to all employees this week, as required by both federal and New Jersey law, advising you that the Company will be sold, or, failing that, that it will close operations on January 5, 2009.

On October 24, 2008, the newspaper announced that 168 newsroom employees had offered to take the company's buyout offer, and that the company had accepted 151 of them, which resulted in a 40% reduction in newsroom staff.

On January 16, 2013, the newspaper announced the layoffs of 34 employees including 18 newsroom staff.

In July 2014, their Newark headquarters was sold to a New York developer, according to a news article released by the paper.

The Star-Ledger continued to publish seven days a week, and retained a presence in Newark in leased office space located within the downtown Gateway Center complex, where the publisher, the newspaper's editorial board, its columnists, its magazine staff and a handful of other jobs were based. Advance Publications, the owner of the newspaper, launched a new media company — NJ Advance Media — in 2014 to provide content, advertising and marketing services for its online presence at NJ.com, and many of its New Jersey newspapers out of the offices in Woodbridge. The sales and marketing staffs moved to Woodbridge in June 2014.

On September 14, 2023, the paper announced it would cease publication of its Saturday print edition, moving to an all-digital delivery of the Saturday edition beginning in 2024.

On October 30, 2024, the company announced it would cease daily print publication of the Star-Ledger on February 2, 2025, along with sister publications the Times of Trenton and South Jersey Times, due to rising costs, decreasing circulation and reduced demand for print. Online versions of the newspapers will continue to be offered, and newsroom coverage is not affected.

== Management ==
=== Presidents ===
- Amzi Armstrong (1832–?)
- William Burnet Kinney (?–1851)
- Thomas T. Kinney (1851–1895)
- James Smith, Jr. (1895–1915)
- Paul Block (1915–1939)
- Samuel Irving Newhouse, Sr. (1939–1979)
- Donald Newhouse (1979–Incumbent)

=== Publishers ===
- Richard Vezza

=== Executive editors ===
In October 2009, managing editor Kevin Whitmer took over as editor. After Whitmer left in September 2015, Richard Vezza assumed the position as editor.

Prior to Whitmer, James Willse ran the newspaper from 1995. He was appointed following the retirement of 32-year veteran editor Mort Pye. Willse was the former editor and publisher of the New York Daily News. Prior to accepting the Ledger's editorship, Willse headed the review of electronic information options for all Newhouse newspapers. He also expanded the Ledger' use of color and encouraged a more aggressive editorial team. The National Press Foundation named Willse its 1999 recipient of the George Beveridge Editor of the Year Award in recognition of Ledger's coverage of racial profiling by the New Jersey State Police.

== In popular culture ==
- The Star-Ledger is featured in the 2021 Showtime series Yellowjackets.
- Between 1999 and 2007, The Star-Ledger was featured prominently various times in the hit television series The Sopranos, an HBO drama series set in New Jersey. Tony Soprano received home delivery of The Star-Ledger, and several episodes opened with him picking it up at the end of his driveway.
  - The Sopranos creator David Chase credited a story by Guy Sterling in The Star-Ledger with inspiring the theme for the series' fifth season in 2004.
- The Star-Ledger serves as the inspiration for a fictional newspaper in an award-winning series of mystery novels by Brad Parks.
- The newspaper was referenced by comedian George Carlin in the 2004 comedy-drama Jersey Girl, which was written and directed by Kevin Smith, a New Jersey native.
- In 2004, The Star-Ledger was featured in Robert Kurson's 2004 novel Shadow Divers.

== See also ==
- Beachgate
- Zan Stewart
