= Samuel Irving Newhouse Sr. =

American broadcasting businessman, magazine and newspaper publisher (1895–1979)

- Born: Solomon Isadore Neuhaus; May 24, 1895; New York City, New York, U.S.
- Died: August 29, 1979 (aged 84); New York City, New York, U.S.
- Education: Rutgers School of Law–Newark
- Occupation: Founder of Advance Publications
- Spouse: Mitzi Epstein (1924–1979)
- Children: Samuel Irving Newhouse Jr. Donald Newhouse
- Parent(s): Meier Neuhaus; Rose Nehaus
- Relatives: Charlotte Newhouse (great-niece)

Samuel Irving Newhouse Sr. (born Solomon Isadore Neuhaus; May 24, 1895 – August 29, 1979) was an American broadcasting businessman, as well as a magazine and newspaper publisher. He was the founder of Advance Publications.

== Early life ==
Newhouse was born Solomon Isadore Neuhaus in a tenement on the Lower East Side of Manhattan, the eldest of eight children born to Jewish immigrants. His father, Meier Neuhaus, was an immigrant from Vitebsk, then Russian Empire (now Belarus); and his mother, Rose (née Arenfeldt), was from Austria-Hungary. Meier Neuhaus later adapted his name to Meyer Newhouse.

Although his father had studied to become a rabbi, he was unskilled and only worked occasionally due to poor health. The family moved to Bayonne, New Jersey where his mother supported the family by peddling linens and in 1908, his father abandoned the family for health reasons to live with his sister in Connecticut. Newhouse quit school and enrolled in a six-week bookkeeping course at the Gaffrey School in Manhattan which enabled him to secure a job as an office boy working for Hyman Lazarus, a lawyer, police court judge, and politician in Bayonne. At age sixteen, he was promoted to office manager of Lazarus' law firm.

== Career ==
Noting Newhouse's work ethic and enthusiasm, Lazarus had Newhouse manage the money-losing Bayonne Times (a local newspaper in which Lazarus had acquired a majority interest, due to an unpaid legal bill), allowing Newhouse to keep half of the profits if successful. Newhouse quickly determined that the paper was not earning enough fees from advertisements, and personally solicited new advertisers while also assisting them in planning the timing of store sales. The paper returned to profitability, and he received a 20 percent ownership interest as payment (after continued success, his share increased to 50 percent). Later, he decided to attend law school in the evenings; in 1916, he graduated from the New Jersey Law School (now Rutgers School of Law–Newark). His career in the practice of law was short-lived: he was so humiliated after losing the one case he took to trial that he paid his client the full amount of the damages he had requested. Nevertheless, thanks to his support, Rutgers School of Law-Newark is presently housed in the S.I. Newhouse Center for Law and Justice.

In 1922, taking all his personal savings and partnering with Lazarus, he bought 51 percent of the Staten Island Advance for $98,000 and soon returned the paper to profitability. In 1924, Lazarus died and Newhouse purchased Lazarus's share from his widow as well as the 49 percent that he and the judge did not own. Newhouse began to expand his empire, purchasing, merging, and returning to profitability numerous papers.

=== Business strategy ===
Newhouse focused on purchasing bargain-priced papers in growing communities. He had no interest in starting new papers or in unrelated ventures, even declining an offer to purchase the New York Yankees. He typically acquired a city's oldest newspaper and then purchased the city's second newspaper, thereby allowing him to set advertising rates. Although he generally promised to keep both papers in business and in competition, he typically merged the two, generally closing the afternoon paper and keeping the morning, effectively establishing a monopoly, then used the profits to purchase additional newspapers.

Newhouse largely ran his various interests out of a brown leather briefcase and kept key figures in his head, even as his acquisitions grew into an empire of 20 newspapers, as well as numerous magazines, radio stations and television stations. He never had what could be called a formal headquarters; for many years, Advance Publications' corporate address was the same as that of the Staten Island Advance.

=== Timeline of acquisitions ===
- 1932: Long Island Daily Press
- 1935: Newark Ledger
- 1939: Newark Star Eagle merged with Newark Ledger to form the Newark Star-Ledger
- 1939: Syracuse Herald and Syracuse Journal (merged)
- 1941: Syracuse Post-Standard
- 1945: Jersey Journal
- 1947: Harrisburg News, and Harrisburg Patriot (later merged into The Patriot-News).
- 1949: Advance Publications Inc. formed as the primary holding company for all his newspaper assets.
- 1950: Portland Oregonian
- 1955: The Birmingham News, The Huntsville Times and the St. Louis Globe-Democrat
- 1959: Condé Nast Publications purchased for $5 million at the suggestion of his wife. According to Newhouse, "She asked for a fashion magazine and I went out and got her Vogue." Condé Nast also published Glamour, House & Garden, and Young Bride. He soon purchased another magazine publisher, Street & Smith and merged it with Condé Nast, becoming a major magazine publisher.
- 1961: Oregon Journal
- 1962: Times-Picayune and States-Item, both in New Orleans, Louisiana (merged in 1980)
- 1967: Cleveland Plain Dealer
- 1976: he purchased Booth Newspapers for $305 million, a chain of eight dailies in Michigan (Ann Arbor News, Bay City Times, Flint Journal, Grand Rapids Press, Jackson Citizen Patriot, Kalamazoo Gazette, Muskegon Chronicle, and the Saginaw News) as well as the Sunday supplement Parade.

== Personal life ==
He was married to arts patron and philanthropist Mitzi Epstein (April 30, 1902 – June 29, 1989), who grew up in an upper middle class, Jewish family on the Upper West Side, the daughter of a silk tie importer. They had two sons, Samuel Irving Newhouse Jr., known as Si Newhouse, chairman of Advance, and Donald Newhouse, president of Advance.

Samuel Newhouse resided in Manhattan for much of his life. In 1942, he bought Greenlands, a working farm of 143 acres in Harbourton, Mercer County, New Jersey. In his privately published memoir, A Memo to my Children, he documented his often strained relationship with his two sons. His great-grandson, S.I. Newhouse IV, is featured in a documentary called Born Rich about the experience of growing up as the heir to one of the world's greatest fortunes.

== Death and legacy ==
Newhouse died in 1979, aged 84, in New York City of a stroke. Upon his death, he passed his voting common stock in the principal family company, Advance Publications, in trust to his six grandchildren and made his two sons the sole trustees.

One of the vessels of the Staten Island Ferry is also named after him, as was the S.I. Newhouse School of Public Communications at Syracuse University, and the S.I. Newhouse Center for Law and Justice at Rutgers School of Law – Newark. He was inducted into the Junior Achievement U.S. Business Hall of Fame in 1989.
