= Staten Island Advance =

Newspaper in Staten Island, New York

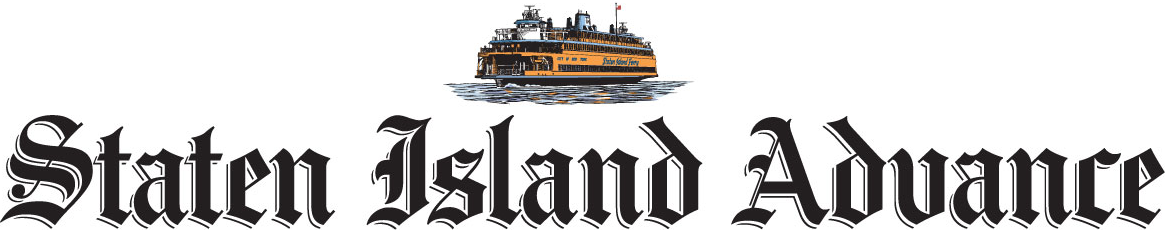
- Type: Daily newspaper
- Format: Broadsheet
- Owner: Advance Publications
- Founder(s): John J. Crawford; James C. Kennedy
- Publisher: Caroline D. Harrison
- Editor: Brian J. Laline
- Founded: 1886
- Headquarters: 1441 South Avenue; Staten Island, New York City, New York, 10314, U.S.
- Circulation: 29,893 Daily (as of 2017)
- OCLC number: 233144961
- Website: silive.com

The Staten Island Advance is the only daily newspaper published in Staten Island, one of the five boroughs of New York City. It is the only major daily newspaper focused exclusively on covering Staten Island. Staten Island Advance covers news of local and community interest, including Staten Island politics. Staten Island Advance is the namesake and nominal flagship publication of Advance Publications.

== History ==
=== 19th century ===
The Advance was founded in 1886 by printer John J. Crawford and businessman James C. Kennedy and initially known as the Richmond County Advance. The name was later changed to the Daily Advance and then to its current name. When The Advance was founded in 1886, there were nine competing daily newspapers in Staten Island. The circulation of The Advance quickly surpassed these early competitors, growing from 4,500 in 1910 to over 80,000 by the mid-1990s.

=== 20th century ===
In 1908, Samuel Irving Newhouse Sr. began working as an office assistant to Hyman Lazarus, an attorney, owner of the Bayonne Times, and a leader of New Jersey's Democratic Party machine. By 1916, when Newhouse was 21, Lazarus rewarded him with a salary of around $30,000 per year, and 25 percent ownership of the Bayonne Times, for loyal service.

In 1922, Newhouse and Lazarus purchased the Staten Island Advance in one of the first in a series of newspapers Lazarus acquired. When Lazarus died in 1924, Newhouse bought his family's share of Staten Island Advance stock.

Throughout the 1920s, the Newhouse family loaned money to Henry Garfinkle, which enabled him to open newsstands that increased sales of the newspaper at St. George Ferry Terminal on Staten Island, and later opened newsstands throughout Manhattan and at LaGuardia Airport in Queens, Newark Airport in Newark, New Jersey, and Port Authority Bus Terminal; the newsstand at Port Authority was, at the time, the world's largest and most lucrative newsstand.

Even during the Great Depression in the 1930s, the Newhouse family had enough money to buy the Long Island Press in Jamaica, Queens and several of its competitors, including the Long Island Star, North Shore Journal, Nassau Journal, Newark Ledger, the Newark Star, and newspapers in Syracuse, New York. Throughout the 1930s, the Newhouse family paid its non-unionized newsroom employees at the Long Island Press a third less than the unionized employees at The New York Times and New York Daily News. Newhouse, in turn, paid himself a salary greater than the total of all the salaries paid to the 65 Staten Island Advance newsroom employees combined.

Throughout the 1940s, the Newhouse family continued aggressively acquiring purchasing newspapers in Syracuse, Jersey City, New Jersey, and Harrisburg, Pennsylvania. In the 1950s, they acquired newspapers in St. Louis, Oregon, and Alabama. The Newhouse family's wealth approached $200 million in the late 1950s, enabling it to purchase Vogue and other Conde Nast magazines. Author Richard Meeker describes the mounting suspicions about the Newhouse family's source of wealth in Newspaperman: S.I. Newhouse and the Business Of News:

Newspaper analysts were so suspicious of the source of Newhouse's funds that they discussed openly the possibility that he was laundering money...Some went so far as to suggest that his newspaper operations had been used as a front for the notorious Reinfeld mob, a group of booze-peddling hoodlums whose boss had made millions during prohibition.

One way the Newhouse family was able to accumulate so much money so rapidly was by hiring accountants and lawyers who figured out unique ways for the Newhouse dynasty to avoid paying taxes. As Newspaperman reported:

"They played every tax game there was", recalled one man who once served as publisher for several Newhouse newspapers. That meant that every cost that could conceivably be written off as a business deduction was, that assets were depreciated as rapidly as possible, and that new acquisitions were "written up" as high as the law allowed ... Where Newhouse developed a special advantage was in the way he avoided paying taxes for the profits that remained to him after the payment of corporate taxes ...
Thanks to an ingenious device created by his accountant, Louis Glickman, and implemented by his attorney, Charles Goldman, Newhouse was able to avoid paying taxes on accumulated earnings and, thus, to multiply the value of his earnings several times. Doing so involved the creation of a special corporate structure for the various newspapers ... Because the Goldman–Glickman construct kept the various enterprises separate—for tax purposes at least—each could claim the right to its own surplus. Taken together, the accumulation that resulted was many times what the IRS would have allowed had Newhouse simply treated all of his operations as a single corporation.

Meeker characterized the Samuel I. Newhouse Foundation as "a charity his Samuel Irving Newhouse Sr.'s lawyers had created as an additional tax dodge", and charged that Newhouse Foundation funds were used by the Newhouse family to finance its $18 million purchase of Alabama's Birmingham News in 1955.

After Newhouse died in 1979, his two sons, Samuel Irving Newhouse Jr. and Donald Newhouse, were accused of tax evasion by the IRS in 1983. While the IRS dropped tax fraud charges against them in the 1980s, it increased the Newhouse family tax delinquency bill to $1.2 billion, asserting that the Newhouse estate was actually worth $2.2 billion, not $1.2 billion when Samuel Newhouse Sr. died in 1979, according to the March 13, 1989, issue of The Nation.

One year after Newhouse's death in 1979, the Advance Group purchased Random House, and then sold it to Bertelsmann eleven years later, in 1998.

The original Staten Island Advance office was located on Castleton Avenue in the West Brighton neighborhood of Staten Island. In 1960, the paper moved to its office on West Fingerboard Road in the Grasmere neighborhood of Staten Island. For many years, the Advance was listed as the nominal headquarters for the Newhouse chain; it did not have a formal headquarters until moving to One World Trade Center in the 2020s. The Newsroom of the Advance was moved to the Teleport in Bulls Head in 2021.

== See also ==
- Media of New York City
