= Advance Publications =

American media company

Advance Publications, Inc.
- Trade name: Advance
- Type: Private
- Industry: Mass media
- Founded: May 12, 1924; 102 years ago
- Founder: Samuel Irving Newhouse Sr.
- Headquarters: One World Trade Center, New York City, U.S.
- Number of locations: 102
- Area served: Worldwide
- Key people: Steven Newhouse (chairman); Oren Klein (CFO); Vacant (president)
- Products: Newspapers, news and information websites, magazines, television
- Revenue: ▼US$2.4 billion (2016)
- Owner: Newhouse family
- Number of employees: 12,000
- Subsidiaries: Advance Local; American City Business Journals; Condé Nast; Turnitin; Charter Communications (13%); Reddit (30%)
- Website: www.advance.com

Advance Publications, Inc. is a privately held American media company owned by the families of Donald Newhouse and Samuel Irving Newhouse Jr., the sons of company founder Samuel Irving Newhouse Sr. It owns publishing-related companies including American City Business Journals, MLive Media Group and Condé Nast. It is a major shareholder in Charter Communications (13%) and Reddit (30%).

== History ==
The company is named after the Staten Island Advance, the first newspaper owned by the Newhouse family, in which Sam Newhouse bought a controlling interest in 1922.

On August 25, 2018, Advance/Newhouse ("A/N") notified Charter Communications that it intended to establish a credit facility collateralized by a portion of Advance/Newhouse Common Units in Charter Communications Holdings, LLC. That same month, Condé Nast CEO Robert A. Sauerberg Jr. announced his five-year strategy to generate $600 million in new revenue from new revenue streams while driving costs out of the business.

In March 2020, the company acquired The Ironman Group, a mass participation sports platform including the Ironman Triathlons and Absa Cape Epic mountain bike race, from the Wanda Sports Group.

== Description ==
For most of its history, Advance had no official headquarters; most publications listed the Advance offices in Staten Island's Grasmere neighborhood as its nominal headquarters.

While it did not have a corporate headquarters, Advance operated a press bureau in Washington, D.C.—the Newhouse News Service (NNS). Opened in 1961, NNS served as a national news bureau for all Advance portfolio publications until it closed in late 2008 as a cost-cutting measure due to the 2008 financial crisis.

As of November 2019, Advance was ranked as the 221st largest privately held company in the United States, according to Forbes.

== Subsidiaries ==
As of August 2021, the group owns Condé Nast (which includes the magazines Vogue, The New Yorker, and Wired), The Ironman Group, Turnitin, Advance Local, American City Business Journals, Stage Entertainment, Leaders Group, and the Seattle-based digital agency Pop, Inc., and is a large shareholder in Reddit.

The company holds an 3.97% ownership in media conglomerate Warner Bros. Discovery, carried over from its 31% stake in predecessor Discovery, Inc. Advance also owns a 13% stake (as of 2016) in Charter Communications, which it received when Bright House Networks merged with Charter.
