= Foreigner discography =

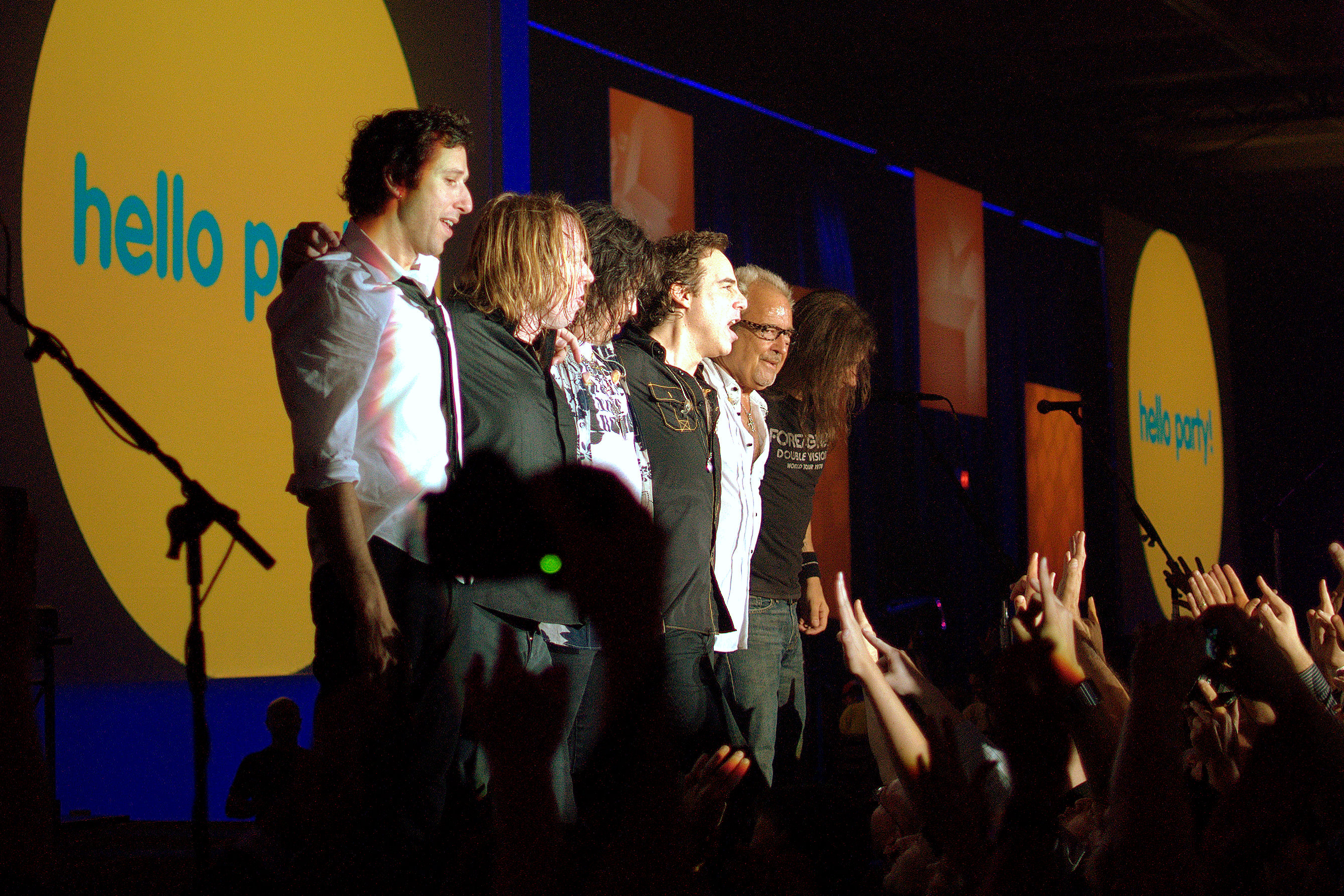
- Foreigner in San Francisco, 2009
- Studio albums: 9
- Live albums: 11
- Compilation albums: 16
- Singles: 47

The discography of Foreigner, a British-American rock band, consists of 9 studio albums, 11 live albums, 16 compilation albums, and 47 singles.

The band was formed in New York City in 1976 by veteran English musicians Mick Jones and Ian McDonald, and American vocalist Lou Gramm. Since then, Foreigner has released nine studio albums, seven of which have reached the top 30 of the Billboard 200 chart. 4 was the band's only chart-topper in the US, while Agent Provocateur was their only album to achieve the same feat on the UK Albums Chart. Overall, Foreigner's albums have sold more than 50 million copies worldwide, almost 40 million of them in the United States alone.

Among the 47 singles released by the band, 14 of them became top 20 hits in the Billboard Hot 100 chart, including the number-one song "I Want to Know What Love Is" and the number-two "Waiting for a Girl Like You", which spent a record-setting 10 weeks at the number 2 position of the chart without ever reaching the top. Four of these singles were certified Gold by the RIAA for shipments of over a million copies, all of them which peaked within the top 3 ("Hot Blooded", "Double Vision", "Waiting for a Girl Like You" and "I Want to Know What Love Is"). Despite its British roots, the band achieved only moderate success in the UK Singles Chart, with only two of their songs, "Waiting for a Girl Like You" and "I Want to Know What Love Is", peaking within the top 20.

In 2014, Rhino released a boxed set of the band's seven albums recorded for Atlantic entitled Foreigner: The Complete Atlantic Studios Albums 1977-1991. The first four albums that were expanded to include bonus tracks in 2002 were included in the set along with the remaining albums by the band. These were housed in cardboard replicas of the original vinyl sleeves.

== Albums ==
=== Studio albums ===
Title	Album details	Peak chart positions										Certifications (sales threshold)
Title	Album details	US	UK	AUS	CAN	GER	NL	NOR	NZ	SWE	SWI	Certifications (sales threshold)
Foreigner	Released: March 8, 1977; Label: Atlantic Records	4	—	9	9	—	—	—	—	—	—	US: 5× Platinum; CAN: Platinum; AUS: Platinum
Double Vision	Released: June 20, 1978; Label: Atlantic Records	3	32	13	3	—	—	—	32	—	—	US: 7× Platinum; CAN: 2× Platinum
Head Games	Released: September 11, 1979; Label: Atlantic Records	5	—	45	5	39	—	—	38	—	—	US: 5× Platinum; CAN: Platinum
4	Released: July 3, 1981; Label: Atlantic Records	1	5	3	2	4	12	—	19	41	—	US: 6× Platinum; AUS: Platinum; FRA: Gold; GER: Platinum; UK: Gold
Agent Provocateur	Released: December 14, 1984; Label: Atlantic Records	4	1	2	3	1	12	1	4	1	1	US: 3× Platinum; FRA: Gold; GER: Platinum; UK: Platinum
Inside Information	Released: December 7, 1987; Label: Atlantic Records	15	64	33	23	7	26	5	—	11	7	US: Platinum; UK: Silver; GER: Gold
Unusual Heat	Released: June 24, 1991; Label: Atlantic Records	117	56	102	50	13	70	18	—	40	8	
Mr. Moonlight	Released: October 24, 1994; Label: Arista Records	136	59	126	69	21	60	—	—	—	17	
Can't Slow Down	Released: September 29, 2009; Label: Rhino Records	29	105	—	—	16	—	—	—	—	26	US: Gold; UK: Silver
"—" denotes releases that did not chart.

=== Live albums ===
Title	Year	Peak chart positions						
Title	Year	US	AUS	CAN	GER	NL	NZ	SWI
Best of Live / Classic Hits Live	1993	—	—	—	—	—	—	—
Live in '05 / Extended Versions	2006	—	—	—	—	—	—	—
Can't Slow Down ... When It's Live! / Extended Versions	2010	88	—	—	—	—	—	—
Alive & Rockin'	2012	—	—	—	—	—	—	—
The Best of 4 & More	2014	162	—	—	—	—	26	—
In Concert: Unplugged	2016	—	—	—	—	—	—	—
Foreigner with the 21st Century Symphony Orchestra & Chorus	2018	—	120	—	9	171	—	14
The Greatest Hits of Foreigner: Live in Concert	2019	—	—	22	—	—	—	—
Live at the Rainbow '78	2019	—	—	—	75	—	—	—
Double Vision: Then and Now Live.Reloaded	2019	—	—	—	26	—	—	—
In the Eye of the Storm	2026	—	—	—	—	—	—	75
"—" denotes releases that did not chart.

=== Compilation albums ===
Title	Year	Peak chart positions									Certifications
Title	Year	US	UK	AUS	GER	NL	NOR	NZ	SWE	SWI	Certifications
Records	1982	10	58	26	22	—	—	17	—	—	US: 7× Platinum; UK: Silver; GER: Gold
The Very Best of Foreigner	1992	—	19	119	23	2	—	—	—	20	AUS: Gold
The Very Best ... and Beyond	1992	123	—	185	—	—	—	49	—	—	UK: Gold
The Best of Ballads – I Want to Know What Love Is	1998	—	—	—	81	—	—	—	—	—	
The Platinum Collection	1999	—	—	178	—	—	—	—	—	—	
Jukebox Heroes: The Foreigner Anthology	2000	—	—	—	—	—	—	—	—	—	
Complete Greatest Hits	2002	80	—	—	—	—	—	—	—	—	US: Platinum
The Definitive	2002	—	33	30	48	71	13	—	40	—	UK: Silver; AUS: Gold
Hot Blooded and Other Hits	2004	—	—	—	—	—	—	—	—	—	US: Gold
The Essentials	2005	—	—	—	—	—	—	—	—	—	
The Definitive Collection	2006	—	—	—	—	—	—	—	—	—	
The Very Best of Toto & Foreigner (Toto & Foreigner)	2007	—	—	—	—	—	—	—	—	84	
No End in Sight: The Very Best of Foreigner	2008	132	—	—	46	—	—	34	—	64	
Juke Box Heroes	2011	108	—	—	—	—	—	—	—	—	US: Gold
I Want to Know What Love Is – The Ballads	2014	—	—	—	60	—	—	—	—	—	
The Soundtrack of Summer (Styx/Foreigner (with Don Felder))	2014	69	—	—	—	—	—	—	—	—	
The Complete Atlantic Studio Albums 1977–1991	2014	—	—	—	—	—	—	—	—	—	
40	2017	106	79	183	94	—	—	—	—	—	
"—" denotes releases that did not chart.

== Singles ==
Single	Year	Peak chart positions											Certifications	Album
Single	Year	US	US Mstrm. Rock	UK	AUS	BEL	CAN	GER	NL	NOR	NZ	SWI	Certifications	Album
"Feels Like the First Time"	1977	4	x	39	41	—	7	—	—	—	—	—	US: Gold	Foreigner
"Cold as Ice"	1977	6	x	24	32	20	9	—	10	—	—	—	US: Gold; UK: Silver	Foreigner
"Long, Long Way from Home"	1977	20	x	—	70	—	22	—	—	—	—	—		Foreigner
"Hot Blooded"	1978	3	x	42	24	—	3	—	46	—	—	—	US: Platinum	Double Vision
"Double Vision"	1978	2	x	—	97	—	7	—	—	—	—	—	US: Gold	Double Vision
"Blue Morning, Blue Day"	1978	15	x	45	—	—	21	—	—	—	—	—		Double Vision
"Dirty White Boy"	1979	12	x	—	—	—	14	—	—	—	—	—		Head Games
"Head Games"	1979	14	x	—	—	—	14	—	—	—	—	—		Head Games
"Love on the Telephone"	1980	—	x	—	—	—	—	—	34	—	—	—		Head Games
"Women"	1980	41	x	—	—	—	82	—	—	—	—	—		Head Games
"I'll Get Even with You"	1980	—	x	—	—	—	—	—	—	—	—	—		Head Games
"Urgent"	1981	4	1	45	24	—	1	12	—	—	—	—		4
"Waiting for a Girl Like You"	1981	2	1	8	3	18	2	29	13	—	10	—	US: Platinum; UK: Gold	4
"Juke Box Hero"	1981	26	3	48	53	—	39	24	—	—	—	—	US: Platinum	4
"Break It Up"	1982	26	—	—	—	—	—	—	—	—	—	—		4
"Luanne"	1982	75	—	—	—	—	—	—	—	—	—	—		4
"I Want to Know What Love Is"	1984	1	1	1	1	6	1	3	2	1	1	2	US: Platinum; UK: Platinum	Agent Provocateur
"That Was Yesterday"	1985	12	4	28	55	25	24	31	19	—	—	29		Agent Provocateur
"Reaction to Action"	1985	54	47	—	—	—	—	—	—	—	—	—		Agent Provocateur
"Cold as Ice" (UK remix)	1985	—	—	64	—	—	—	—	—	—	—	—		Non-album single
"Down on Love"	1985	54	—	—	—	—	—	—	—	—	—	—		Agent Provocateur
"Growing Up the Hard Way"	1985	—	—	—	—	—	—	—	—	—	—	—		Agent Provocateur
"Say You Will"	1987	6	1	71	6	24	13	22	12	4	—	20		Inside Information
"I Don't Want to Live Without You"	1988	5	18	91	21	25	18	—	16	—	—	—		Inside Information
"Heart Turns to Stone"	1988	56	7	—	—	—	—	—	—	—	—	—		Inside Information
"Lowdown and Dirty"	1991	—	4	110	123	—	50	—	—	—	—	—		Unusual Heat
"I'll Fight for You"	1991	—	42	122	—	—	—	—	—	—	—	—		Unusual Heat
"With Heaven on Our Side"	1992	—^{[A]}	—	—	—	—	85	—	—	—	—	—		The Very Best ... and Beyond
"Soul Doctor"	1993	—	5	—	—	—	48	—	—	—	—	—		The Very Best ... and Beyond
"White Lie"	1994	—	—	58	120	—	—	51	—	—	—	—		Mr. Moonlight
"Until the End of Time"	1995	42^{[B]}	—	84	150	—	13	—	—	—	—	—		Mr. Moonlight
"Rain"	1995	—	—	—	—	—	—	84	—	—	—	—		Mr. Moonlight
"All I Need to Know"	1995	—	—	—	—	—	36	—	—	—	—	—		Mr. Moonlight
"Under the Gun"	1995	—	28	—	—	—	55	—	—	—	—	—		Mr. Moonlight
"When It Comes to Love"	2009	—^{[C]}	—	—	—	—	—	—	—	—	—	—		Can't Slow Down
"In Pieces"	2010	—^{[D]}	—	—	—	—	—	—	—	—	—	—		Can't Slow Down
"The Flame Still Burns"	2016	—	—	—	—	—	—	—	—	—	—	—		40
"—" denotes releases that did not chart.

- A "With Heaven on Our Side" did not chart on the Billboard Hot 100 but did peak at number three on the Bubbling Under Hot 100 Singles chart, which is an extension of the Billboard Hot 100.
- B "Until the End of Time" additionally charted on the Billboard Adult Contemporary chart, where it peaked at #8.
- C "When It Comes to Love" did not chart on the Billboard Hot 100, but did chart on the Billboard Adult Contemporary chart, where it peaked at #19.
- D "In Pieces" did not chart on the Billboard Hot 100, but did chart on the Billboard Adult Contemporary chart, where it peaked at #21.

== Music videos ==
List of music videos
Year	Title
1977	"Feels Like The First Time"
1977	"Cold As Ice"
1978	"Double Vision"
1978	"Blue Morning, Blue Day"
1979	"Dirty White Boy"
1979	"Head Games"
1981	"Urgent"
1981	"Waiting for a Girl Like You"
1981	"Juke Box Hero"
1984	"I Want To Know What Love Is"
1985	"That Was Yesterday"
1987	"Say You Will"
1988	"I Don't Want to Live Without You"
1988	"Heart Turns to Stone"
1991	"Lowdown And Dirty"
1991	"I'll Fight For You"
1992	"With Heaven on Our Side"
1993	"Soul Doctor"
1994	"White Lie"
1995	"Until The End Of Time"
2010	"I When It Comes To Love"
2011	"Too Late"
2012	"Can't Slow Down"

== Other charted songs ==
Song	Year	Peak chart positions	Album
Song	Year	US Mainstream Rock	Album
"Night Life"	1981	14	4
"Tooth and Nail"	1985	47	Agent Provocateur
"Can't Wait"	1988	18	Inside Information
