= 40 (Foreigner album) =

Compilation album by Foreigner
- Released: May 19, 2017
- Recorded: 1977–2017
- Genres: Hard rock; rock; pop rock
- Length: 2:33:29
- Labels: Atlantic; Rhino

Foreigner chronology
The Complete Atlantic Studio Albums 1977–1991 (2014)	40 (2017)	Foreigner with the 21st Century Symphony Orchestra & Chorus (2018)

Professional ratings
Review scores
Source	Rating
AllMusic	4/5 stars

40: Forty Hits From Forty Years 1977-2017 is a two-disc compilation album by British-American rock band Foreigner, released on May 19, 2017. The album includes two new recordings: a rerecording of "I Don't Want to Live Without You", and the new song "Give My Life for Love".

The compilation consists of some of Foreigner's biggest hits and popular album tracks from 1977 through the 2016 EP "The Flame Still Burns".

== Background ==
The album celebrates Foreigner's 40th anniversary of their first release with Atlantic Records. The album includes all Foreigner's' biggest hits from 1977 to 2017. It was released through Atlantic Records and contains 40 tracks. To promote the album Foreigner toured.

== Reception ==
David Chiu from Popmatters said, "This year is the 40th anniversary of the release of Foreigner's self-titled debut, and marking that milestone is this latest two-CD greatest hits compilation, simply called 40, which collects 40 (get it?) of the band's hits (the title and artwork are a nod to the band's 1981 smash album 4). There have been similar Foreigner double-disc packages (Jukebox Heroes and No End in Sight), but 40 is the most current by including tracks from 2009's Can't Slow Down and the group's recent single 'The Flame Still Burns'."

Neil Jeffries from LouderSound said, "This new collection is a career-spanning two-CD set that features 40 remastered tracks from 40 years. And it's all packaged to look a little like Foreigner 4, their greatest success from those four decades. What could be neater? There’s a 23-song double-vinyl version but, really, why would you bother with that?"

== Track listing ==
=== Disc one ===
No.	Title	Writer(s)	Album	Length
1.	"Feels Like the First Time" (Radio Edit)	Mick Jones	Foreigner (1977)	3:15
2.	"Starrider"	Mick Jones, Al Greenwood	Foreigner (1977)	4:01
3.	"Cold as Ice" (Single Mix)	Lou Gramm, Mick Jones	Foreigner (1977)	3:22
4.	"Long, Long Way from Home"	Lou Gramm, Mick Jones, Ian McDonald	Foreigner (1977)	2:51
5.	"Headknocker"	Lou Gramm, Mick Jones	Foreigner (1977)	2:59
6.	"Hot Blooded" (Radio Edit)	Lou Gramm, Mick Jones	Double Vision (1978)	3:02
7.	"Double Vision" (Radio Edit)	Lou Gramm, Mick Jones	Double Vision (1978)	3:30
8.	"Blue Morning, Blue Day"	Lou Gramm, Mick Jones	Double Vision (1978)	3:09
9.	"Dirty White Boy" (Radio Edit)	Lou Gramm, Mick Jones	Head Games (1979)	3:12
10.	"Head Games"	Lou Gramm, Mick Jones	Head Games (1979)	3:38
11.	"Women"	Mick Jones	Head Games (1979)	3:24
12.	"Urgent" (Radio Edit)	Mick Jones	4 (1981)	3:58
13.	"Juke Box Hero" (Radio Edit)	Lou Gramm, Mick Jones	4 (1981)	4:05
14.	"Waiting for a Girl Like You" (Radio Edit)	Lou Gramm, Mick Jones	4 (1981)	4:34
15.	"Night Life"	Lou Gramm, Mick Jones	4 (1981)	3:49
16.	"Luanne"	Lou Gramm, Mick Jones	4 (1981)	3:28
17.	"I Want to Know What Love Is"	Mick Jones	Agent Provocateur (1984)	5:04
18.	"That Was Yesterday"	Lou Gramm, Mick Jones	Agent Provocateur (1984)	3:48
19.	"Tooth and Nail"	Lou Gramm, Mick Jones	Agent Provocateur (1984)	3:53
20.	"Reaction to Action" (Radio Edit)	Lou Gramm, Mick Jones	Agent Provocateur (1984)	3:32
21.	"Down on Love"	Lou Gramm, Mick Jones	Agent Provocateur (1984)	4:08
Total length:				1:16:52

=== Disc two ===
No.	Title	Writer(s)	Album	Length
1.	"Heart Turns to Stone" (Radio Edit)	Lou Gramm, Mick Jones	Inside Information (1987)	4:07
2.	"Can't Wait"	Lou Gramm, Mick Jones	Inside Information (1987)	4:31
3.	"Lowdown and Dirty"	Mick Jones, Johnny Edwards, Terry Thomas	Unusual Heat (1991)	4:21
4.	"Soul Doctor"	Lou Gramm, Mick Jones	The Very Best ... and Beyond (1992)	4:51
5.	"White Lie" (Single Version)	Lou Gramm, Mick Jones	Mr. Moonlight (1994)	4:14
6.	"Rain"	Lou Gramm, Mick Jones, Bruce Turgon	Mr. Moonlight (1994)	4:35
7.	"All I Need to Know"	Lou Gramm, Mick Jones	Mr. Moonlight (1994)	4:44
8.	"Too Late"	Mick Jones, Marti Frederiksen, Oliver Leiber, Russ Irwin	Can't Slow Down (2009)	3:45
9.	"When It Comes to Love"	Mick Jones, Kelly Hansen, Marti Frederiksen	Can't Slow Down (2009)	3:52
10.	"Can't Slow Down"	Mick Jones, Kelly Hansen, Marti Frederiksen	Can't Slow Down (2009)	3:28
11.	"In Pieces"	Mick Jones, Kelly Hansen, Marti Frederiksen	Can't Slow Down (2009)	3:55
12.	"Fool for You Anyway"	Mick Jones	Can't Slow Down (2009)	4:02
13.	"Say You Will" (Acoustic)	Lou Gramm, Mick Jones	Acoustique (2011)	3:28
14.	"Save Me"	Mick Jones, Jimmy Messer, Roman Messer, Samantha Ronson	Juke Box Heroes (2011)	3:49
15.	"Girl on the Moon" (Live)	Lou Gramm, Mick Jones	The Best of Foreigner 4 & More (2014)	4:13
16.	"Break It Up" (Live)	Mick Jones	The Best of Foreigner 4 & More (2014)	4:27
17.	"I Don't Want to Live Without You"	Mick Jones	New re-recording	3:36
18.	"Give My Life for Love"	Mick Jones, Marti Frederiksen, Cliff Downs, Kate York	New recording	3:57
19.	"The Flame Still Burns"	Mick Jones, Marti Frederiksen, Chris Difford	"The Flame Still Burns" EP (2016)	4:47
Total length:				1:18:50

== Charts ==
=== Weekly charts ===
Chart (2017)	Peak position
Australian Albums (ARIA)	183
German Albums (Offizielle Top 100)	94
UK Albums (Official Charts)	79
US Billboard 200	106
US Top Rock Albums (Billboard)	15

Chart (2025)	Peak position
Greek Albums (IFPI)	74

=== Year-end charts ===
Chart (2017)	Position
US Top Rock Albums (Billboard)	84

== Certifications ==
Region	Certification	Certified units/sales
United Kingdom (BPI)	Silver	60,000^{‡}
^{‡} Sales+streaming figures based on certification alone.

== Personnel ==
- Lou Gramm – lead vocals, percussion
- Mick Jones – lead guitar, keyboards, backing vocals
- Ian McDonald – rhythm guitar, woodwind, backing vocals
- Ed Gagliardi – bass, backing vocals
- Dennis Elliott – drums, percussion
- Al Greenwood – keyboards, synthesizers
- Rick Wills – bass, backing vocals
- Johnny Edwards – lead vocals, rhythm guitar
- Scott Gilman – rhythm guitar, woodwind, backing vocals
- Bruce Turgon – bass, backing vocals
- Mark Schulman – drums, backing vocals
- Jeff Jacobs – keyboards, backing vocals
- Kelly Hansen – lead vocals, percussion
- Thom Gimbel – rhythm guitar, woodwind, backing vocals
- Jeff Pilson – bass, backing vocal
- Brian Tichy – drums
- Michael Bluestein – keyboards, backing vocals
