= Best of Live (Foreigner album) =

Live album by Foreigner
- Released: November 16, 1993
- Recorded: July 1, 1977 – May 14, 1985
- Genre: Rock
- Label: Atlantic / WEA

Foreigner chronology
The Very Best ... and Beyond (1992)	Best of Live (1993)	Mr. Moonlight (1994)

Best of Live, alternatively known as Classic Hits Live, is Foreigner's first live album. It was released in 1993, and contains live versions of many of their well-known songs all of which were taken from various concerts between 1977 and 1985. Ultimate Classic Rock named it as part of their "Most Awesome Live Albums from Every Rock Legend" list in 2019.

== Track listing ==
No.	Title	Recorded	Length
1.	"Double Vision" (originally from Double Vision, 1978)	10/22/1979 @ The Spectrum, Philadelphia, PA	4:49
2.	"Cold as Ice" (originally from Foreigner, 1977)	10/28/1979 @ The Memorial Auditorium, Syracuse, NY	6:23
3.	"The Damage Is Done" (originally from Foreigner, 1977)	9/7/1979 @ The Richmond Coliseum, Richmond, VA	4:32
4.	"Women" (originally from Head Games, 1979)	10/28/1979 @ The Memorial Auditorium, Syracuse, NY	4:19
5.	"Dirty White Boy" (originally from Head Games, 1979)	10/22/1979 @ The Spectrum, Philadelphia, PA	3:57
6.	"Fool for You Anyway" (originally from Foreigner, 1977)	7/1/1977 @ WKQX, Chicago, IL	4:29
7.	"Head Games" (originally from Head Games, 1979)	10/27/1979 @ The Memorial Auditorium, Rochester, NY	4:03
8.	"Not Fade Away" (Buddy Holly cover, 1957)	5/14/1985 @ The Bayou, Washington, DC	3:39
9.	"Waiting for a Girl Like You" (originally from 4, 1981)	3/24/1985 @ The Omni, Atlanta, GA	5:39
10.	"Juke Box Hero" (originally from 4, 1981)	7/15/1983 in Dortmund, Germany	5:42
11.	"Urgent" (originally from 4, 1981)	7/17/1982 @ Anaheim Stadium, Anaheim, CA	6:00
12.	"Love Maker" (Betty Wright cover, 1973)	7/1/1977 @ WKQX, Chicago, IL	6:46
13.	"I Want to Know What Love Is" (originally from Agent Provocateur, 1984)	3/25/1985 @ The Omni, Atlanta, GA	6:16
14.	"Feels Like the First Time" (originally from Foreigner, 1977)	10/28/1979 @ The Memorial Auditorium, Syracuse, NY	7:40

== Personnel ==
- Lou Gramm – percussion, lead vocals
- Mick Jones – guitar, piano, backing vocals
- Ed Gagliardi – bass, backing vocals
- Rick Wills – bass, backing vocals
- Ian McDonald – saxophone, keyboards, guitars, backing vocals
- Al Greenwood – keyboards, synthesizers
- Dennis Elliott – drums
