= The Definitive Collection (Foreigner album) =

Compilation album by Foreigner
- Released: March 28, 2006
- Recorded: 1977–1992
- Genre: Hard rock, rock, pop rock
- Label: Atlantic

Professional ratings
Review scores
Source	Rating
Allmusic	4/5 stars

The Definitive Collection is a double-disc compilation album by the band Foreigner, released in 2006 on Atlantic/Rhino Records.

== Track listing ==
All songs are written by Mick Jones and Lou Gramm and performed by Foreigner, except where noted.

=== Disc 1 ===
1. "Feels Like the First Time" (Jones)
2. "Long, Long Way from Home" (Jones, Gramm, Ian McDonald)
3. "Cold as Ice"
4. "Headknocker"
5. "Starrider" (Al Greenwood, Jones)
6. "At War with the World" (Jones)
7. "Double Vision"
8. "Blue Morning, Blue Day"
9. "Hot Blooded"
10. "I Have Waited So Long" (Jones)
11. "Dirty White Boy"
12. "Head Games"
13. "Women" (Jones)
14. "Rev on the Red Line" (Gramm, Greenwood)
15. "Break It Up" (Jones)
16. "Juke Box Hero"

=== Disc 2 ===
1. "Urgent" (Jones)
2. "Waiting for a Girl Like You"
3. "I Want to Know What Love Is" (Jones)
4. "Down on Love"
5. "Reaction to Action"
6. "That Was Yesterday"
7. "Midnight Blue" (by Lou Gramm) (Gramm, Bruce Turgon)
8. "Heart Turns to Stone"
9. "I Don't Want to Live Without You" (Jones)
10. "Say You Will"
11. "Just Wanna Hold" (by Mick Jones) (Jones, Ian Hunter, M. Phillips)
12. "Just Between You and Me" (by Lou Gramm) (Gramm, Holly Knight)
13. "Lowdown and Dirty" (Jones, Johnny Edwards, Terry Thomas)
14. "Soul Doctor"
