= Extended Versions (Foreigner album) =

Live album by Foreigner
- Released: 2006
- Recorded: November 26, 2005
- Genre: Rock
- Length: 66:40; 74:19 (European release)
- Label: Sony BMG
- Producer: Jeff Pilson

Foreigner chronology
The Essentials (2005)	Extended Versions (2006)	The Definitive Collection (2006)

Extended Versions is a live album that was recorded by the rock group Foreigner on 26 November 2005 at Texas Station in North Las Vegas, Nevada. This is part of a long-running budget live series started by BMG in the late 1990s. The European release contains two more tracks: “That Was Yesterday” and “Blue Morning, Blue Day”.

== Track listing ==
1. "Head Games" – 5:54
2. "Cold as Ice" – 5:45
3. "Waiting for a Girl Like You" – 5:53
4. "Dirty White Boy" – 4:27
5. "Starrider" – 6:51
6. "Feels Like the First Time" – 5:36
7. "Urgent" – 8:03
8. "Juke Box Hero/Whole Lotta Love" – 8:58
9. "I Want to Know What Love Is" – 6:48
10. "Hot Blooded" – 8:18

== Featuring ==
- Kelly Hansen - Lead Vocals
- Mick Jones - Lead Guitar, Backing Vocals, Lead Vocals on "Starrider"
- Thom Gimbel - Rhythm Guitar, Saxophone, Flute, Backing Vocals
- Jeff Jacobs - Keyboards, Backing Vocals
- Jeff Pilson - Bass, Backing Vocals
- Jason Bonham - Drums
