= The Very Best ... and Beyond =

Greatest hits album by Foreigner
- Released: September 22, 1992 (US); December 7, 1992 (UK)
- Recorded: 1977–1992
- Genre: Rock; hard rock; pop metal
- Length: 73:10
- Label: Atlantic
- Producer: Duane Baron; John Purdell; Mick Jones; Lou Gramm; Robert John "Mutt" Lange; Keith Olsen; Ian McDonald; Alex Sadkin; Frank Filipetti; Roy Thomas Baker; John Sinclair; Gary Lyons

Foreigner chronology
Unusual Heat (1991)	The Very Best ... and Beyond (1992)	Best of Live (1993)

Singles from The Very Best ... and Beyond
- 1. "With Heaven on Our Side" Released: 1992; 2. "Soul Doctor" Released: 1992

Professional ratings
Review scores
Source	Rating
Allmusic	4/5 stars

The Very Best ... and Beyond is a primarily American greatest hits album by the British-American rock band Foreigner released on September 22, 1992 by Atlantic Records. The collection spans the band's history from 1977 through 1987, and includes three new tracks recorded in 1992. The compilation skips over the period in the early 1990s when original lead singer Lou Gramm had left the band, omitting any songs from the 1991 album Unusual Heat.

Earlier in 1992, a compilation titled The Very Best of Foreigner, with a different tracklist, was released in the United Kingdom and Europe. The Very Best ... and Beyond was eventually also released in the United Kingdom on December 7, 1992.

== Track listing ==
All tracks are written by Mick Jones and Lou Gramm, except where noted.

No.	Title	Writer(s)	Original album	Length
1.	"Soul Doctor"		Newly released, 1992	4:51
2.	"Prisoner of Love"		Newly released	5:15
3.	"With Heaven on Our Side"	Jones; Gramm; Johnny Edwards; Parthenon Huxley; Steve Schiff	Newly released	5:16
4.	"Juke Box Hero"		4, 1981	4:19
5.	"Hot Blooded"		Double Vision, 1978	4:24
6.	"Cold as Ice"		Foreigner, 1977	3:20
7.	"Head Games"		Head Games, 1979	3:37
8.	"Waiting for a Girl Like You"		4	4:50
9.	"Urgent"	Jones	4	4:29
10.	"Double Vision"		Double Vision	3:43
11.	"I Want to Know What Love Is"	Jones	Agent Provocateur, 1984	5:03
12.	"Say You Will"		Inside Information, 1987	4:11
13.	"That Was Yesterday"		Agent Provocateur	3:46
14.	"I Don't Want to Live Without You"	Jones	Inside Information	4:53
15.	"Rev on the Red Line"	Al Greenwood; Gramm	Head Games	3:34
16.	"Dirty White Boy"		Head Games	3:38
17.	"Feels Like the First Time"	Jones	Foreigner	3:51
Total length:				73:10

== Personnel ==
- Lou Gramm – vocals, percussion
- Mick Jones – guitars, acoustic guitar, bass, piano, keyboards, background vocals
- Ed Gagliardi – bass and background vocals on 5–6, 10, 17
- Rick Wills – bass and background vocals on 4, 7–9, 11–16
- Bruce Turgon – bass, background vocals on 1–3
- Ian McDonald – guitar, horn, keyboards, background vocals on 5–7, 10, 15–17
- Al Greenwood – synthesizer, keyboards on 5–7, 10, 15–17
- Jeff Jacobs – synthesizer, keyboards, background vocals on 1–3
- Dennis Elliott – drums on 4–17
- Mark Schulman – drums, background vocals on 1–3
- Robin Zander – background vocals on 1–3

== Charts ==
Chart (1992)	Peak position
Australian Albums (ARIA)	185
Austrian Albums (Ö3 Austria)	34
Dutch Albums (Album Top 100)	2
Finnish Albums (The Official Finnish Charts)	13
German Albums (Offizielle Top 100)	23
Japanese Albums (Oricon)	98
New Zealand Albums (RMNZ)	49
Swiss Albums (Schweizer Hitparade)	20
UK Albums (OCC)	19
US Billboard 200	123

== Certifications ==
Region	Certification	Certified units/sales
Australia (ARIA)	Gold	35,000^{^}
France (SNEP)	Gold	100,000^{*}
Switzerland (IFPI Switzerland)	Gold	25,000^{^}
United Kingdom (BPI)	Gold	100,000^{^}
United States (RIAA)	2× Platinum	2,000,000^{^}
^{*} Sales figures based on certification alone.^{^} Shipments figures based on certification alone.
