= Love on the Telephone =

"Love On The Telephone"

Single by Foreigner

from the album Head Games
- B-side: "Women"
- Released: 1980
- Recorded: early 1979
- Genre: Hard rock
- Length: 3:18
- Label: Atlantic
- Songwriters: Lou Gramm, Mick Jones
- Producers: Roy Thomas Baker, Mick Jones, Ian McDonald

Foreigner singles chronology
"Head Games" (1979)	"Love On The Telephone" (1980)	"Women" (1980)

"Love on the Telephone" was the third single from the third album, Head Games by the band, Foreigner. The song was written by Lou Gramm & Mick Jones, and released as a single in Europe. It reached No. 34 in the Netherlands. The song's b-side, "Women" was chosen as the next single for the American market.

Johnson City Press arts writer Elaine Cloud Goller described "Love on the Telephone" as a "road-weary rock and roller's lament."

Pete Bishop of The Pittsburgh Press praised the song for its melody, full arrangement and muscle. El Diario del Centro del País praised the song as a great example of classic rock. Evening Post critic Dave Murray praised Gramm's lead vocal performance. Daily Republican Register critic Mike Bishop said that "Love on the Telephone" is "a fairly good rocker" and said that lead singer Gramm sounds a lot like Bad Company lead singer Paul Rodgers, Al Greenwood's keyboards sound a lot like Styx and that the song's chord progression is very similar to that of Foreigner's earlier song "Cold as Ice." Morning Call critic Alan Janesch felt that lyric saying that the "line's engaged" was lifted from the Beatles' "You Won't See Me."

During Foreigner's 1981 tour supporting 4 "Love on the Telephone" generally served as the first song of the encore, followed by "Hot Blooded" and "Headknocker."
