= Head Games =

Head games are actions performed for reasons of psychological one-upmanship.

Head Games may refer to:

- Head Games (film), a 2012 documentary film
- Head Games (album), a 1979 album by rock band Foreigner
  - "Head Games" (song), song from above album
- Head Games (novel), a 1995 novel based on the Doctor Who television series
- Head Games (game show), a 2009 television game show
- Head Games, a 1993 film directed by Richard W. Haines
- Head Games, a 2007 novel by Craig McDonald
- Head Games, a 2012 documentary television series on Discovery Channel
- Head Games Publishing, a defunct game company now part of Activision
