= Spys (band) =

American rock band

- Origin: New York City, New York, U.S
- Genres: Rock
- Years active: 1981–1983
- Label: EMI Records
- Past members: John Blanco; John DiGaudio; Al Greenwood; Ed Gagliardi; Billy Milne

Spys was an American rock band formed in New York City in 1981 by Al Greenwood and Ed Gagliardi, who had been keyboardist and bassist, respectively, of Foreigner. They signed with EMI Records and released their debut album, Spys, in 1982, produced by Neil Kernon. The album reached No. 138 on the Billboard 200 chart and the single "Don't Run My Life" reached No. 82 on the Billboard Hot 100 and No. 19 on the Hot Mainstream Rock Tracks chart. A follow-up album, Behind Enemy Lines, was released in 1983, but it did not sell well, and after a contract dispute with the label, the group disbanded.

== Members ==
- John Blanco – vocals (1981–1983)
- John DiGaudio – guitar (1981–1983)
- Al Greenwood – keyboards (1981–1983)
- Ed Gagliardi – bass (1981–1983)
- Billy Milne – drums (1981–1983)

== Discography ==
- Spys (EMI, 1982)
- Behind Enemy Lines (EMI, 1983)
