= Mick Jones (album) =

Studio album by Mick Jones
- Released: 7 August 1989
- Recorded: 1988–89
- Studio: Atlantic Studios, The Hit Factory, Electric Lady Studios, Clinton Recording Studios and Skyline Studios (New York City, New York); Blue Wave Recording Studios (St. Phillip, Barbados)
- Genre: Hard rock
- Length: 42:14
- Label: Atlantic Records
- Producer: Mick Jones

Professional ratings
Review scores
| Source | Rating |
|---|---|
| AllMusic | 4.5/5 stars |

Mick Jones is Foreigner guitarist Mick Jones' self-titled debut/studio album, released in 1989 and his only solo release to date.

Released on Atlantic Records, this album included Billy Joel and Carly Simon as guest singers. Joel sang with Jones on the song "Just Wanna Hold" and Simon sang with Jones on the songs "That's the Way My Love Is" and "Write Tonight". It is widely believed that the co-composer "M. Phillips" on the track "Just Wanna Hold" is a pseudonym of Mick Jagger.

== Track listing ==
All songs written by Mick Jones, except where noted.

Side one

1. "Just Wanna Hold" (Jones, Ian Hunter, M. Phillips) — 3:30
2. "Save Me Tonight" (Jones, Diane Warren, Joe Brooks) — 3:50
3. "That's the Way My Love Is" — 3:25
4. "The Wrong Side of the Law" — 5:14
5. "4 Wheels Turnin'" — 4:35

Side two

6. "Everything That Comes Around" (Jones, Joe Brooks) — 4:41
7. "You Are My Friend" — 5:39
8. "Danielle" (Jones, Joe Brooks) — 4:34
9. "Write Tonight" — 4:25
10. "Johnny (Part 1)" — 1:43

== Personnel ==
- Mick Jones – lead vocals, backing vocals (1–9), guitars (1, 4, 6, 7), bass (1, 3, 4, 6, 9), lead guitar (2, 3, 5, 8, 9), keyboards (2, 3, 6–10), percussion (3), rhythm guitar (5), acoustic piano (6), acoustic guitar (8, 9)
- Ian Hunter – acoustic piano (1), backing vocals (1)
- Jeff Jacobs – keyboards (1, 2)
- Kevin Jones – keyboard programming and sequencing, keyboards (2, 4, 8), guitars (2, 3, 5, 9), bass (2), percussion (2–7, 9), drums (6, 9)
- John Mahoney – additional programming (4, 6)
- Leon Pendarvis – acoustic piano (6)
- Jeff Bova – additional keyboards (7)
- Hugh McCracken – acoustic guitar (3), slide guitar (8)
- Schuyler Deale – bass (1)
- Robert Sabino – bass (7)
- Rick Wills – bass (8)
- Dennis Elliott – drums (1, 4, 5)
- Liberty DeVitto – drums (2)
- Steve Ferrone – drums (3)
- Andy Newmark – drums (7)
- Simon Kirke – drums (8)
- Crystal Taliefero – percussion (1), backing vocals (1)
- Lenny Pickett – saxophone (9)
- Billy Joel – lead vocals (1). Billy Joel's then wife Christine Brinkley features in the music video for track 1.
- Joe Lynn Turner – backing vocals (1, 2), lead vocals (2)
- Ian Lloyd – backing vocals (2, 3, 5–9), lead vocals (5)
- Carly Simon – lead vocals (3, 9)
- Timothy Wright Concert Choir – choir (6)

== Production ==
- Mick Jones – producer
- Jason Corsaro – engineer
- Gary Hellman – engineer
- Tom Lord-Alge – mixing (1, 2)
- Mark McKenna – engineer, mixing (3)
- Dave Whittman – engineer, mixing (4, 5, 7, 8)
- Jay Healy – engineer, mixing (9)
- Tim Leitner – engineer, 1957 Chevy sounds (5), mixing (10)
- Elusive Aaron – assistant engineer
- Paul Angelli – assistant engineer
- Neil Dignon – assistant engineer
- David Dorn – assistant engineer
- Ellen Fitton – assistant engineer
- Tom Fritze – assistant engineer
- Ed Korengo – assistant engineer
- Paul Logus – assistant engineer
- Joe Pirrera – assistant engineer
- Ted Jensen – mastering
- Bob Defrin – art direction, design
- Meiert Avis – video graphics
- Charlie Whisker – video graphics

Studios

- Recorded at Atlantic Studios, The Hit Factory, Electric Lady Studios, Clinton Recording Studios and Skyline Studios (New York City, New York); Blue Wave Recording Studios (St. Phillip, Barbados).
- Mixed at The Hit Factory and Electric Lady Studios.
- Mastered at Sterling Sound (New York City, New York).
