= Unusual Heat =

Studio album by Foreigner
- Released: June 24, 1991
- Recorded: 1990
- Studios: BearTracks (Suffern, New York); Right Track (New York City); The Farmyard (Little Chalfont, England); Outside Studio (Hook End Manor, England)
- Genres: Hard rock; pop rock
- Length: 51:30
- Label: Atlantic
- Producers: Terry Thomas; Mick Jones

Foreigner chronology
Inside Information (1987)	Unusual Heat (1991)	The Very Best ... and Beyond (1992)

Singles from Unusual Heat
- 1. "Lowdown and Dirty" Released: June 10, 1991; 2. "I'll Fight for You" Released: August 1991

Unusual Heat is the seventh studio album by British-American rock band Foreigner, released in June 1991 by Atlantic Records. Recorded at several different studios across the state of New York and England, and produced by Terry Thomas and Mick Jones, it was the only album with lead singer Johnny Edwards, who replaced original lead singer Lou Gramm, and their final album with original drummer Dennis Elliott and longtime bassist Rick Wills.

== Background ==
Edwards was a veteran singer who performed with Montrose and later fronted Wild Horses. As Edwards told Ultimate Classic Rock in a separate interview, Wild Horses had only just signed its record deal — and although joining for Foreigner was obviously tempting for financial reasons if nothing else, he was reluctant to walk away from his own band after struggling for years to make it on his own terms.

Jones, however, was undeterred—and eager to work with a singer most fans hadn't heard of rather than hiring a big-name replacement who'd come with his own baggage. "We were in rehearsal and talks with a couple of guys who were both strong candidates and had kind of a name," he admitted. "I felt eventually that it was probably going to be better to not try and put an all-star band together, but to keep on the same kind of path with four people being involved in making a record and not really, I think I would probably say, cheapening the band at that point—cheapening the meaning and the direction of the band."

The original version of the song "Ready for the Rain", demoed by the Sacramento, CA based band Northrup in the late 1980s with Johnny Edwards on lead vocals, was finally released in 2001 by Metal Mayhem Music as part of a collection of demos under the name JK Northrup.

== Reception ==
Professional ratings
Review scores
Source	Rating
AllMusic	3/5 stars
Entertainment Weekly	D
Rolling Stone	2.5/5 stars

Unusual Heat was a commercial failure, only peaking at number 117 on the Billboard 200 chart – a sharp decline in sales comparing with all previous albums, all of which reached the Top 20 and became at least Platinum. Neither of the two singles released from the album charted on the Billboard Hot 100, with "Lowdown and Dirty" only charting on the Mainstream Rock chart at number 4.

== Track listing ==
All tracks are written by Mick Jones, Johnny Edwards, and Terry Thomas, except where noted.

No.	Title	Writer(s)	Length
1.	"Only Heaven Knows"		4:47
2.	"Lowdown and Dirty"		4:21
3.	"I'll Fight for You"		6:02
4.	"Moment of Truth"		4:25
5.	"Mountain of Love"		4:37
6.	"Ready for the Rain"	Edwards; Jeff Northrup; Jones; Thomas	5:02
7.	"When the Night Comes Down"		4:43
8.	"Safe in My Heart"	Jones	4:32
9.	"No Hiding Place"		3:55
10.	"Flesh Wound"		4:17
11.	"Unusual Heat"		4:32
Total length:			51:30

== Personnel ==
=== Foreigner ===
- Johnny Edwards – lead vocals, backing vocals, lead guitar (on "Mountain of Love")
- Mick Jones – keyboards, lead guitar, guitars, backing vocals
- Rick Wills – bass, backing vocals
- Dennis Elliott – drums

=== Additional musicians ===
- Richard Cottle – keyboards
- Tommy Mandel – keyboards
- Terry Thomas – keyboards, guitars, backing vocals
- Tony Beard – electronic percussion
- Felix Krish – bass
- Ian Lloyd – backing vocals
- Mark Rivera – backing vocals
- Rachele Cappelli – backing vocals
- Angela Cappelli – backing vocals
- Lani Groves – backing vocals
- Vaneese Thomas – backing vocals

== Production ==
- Producers – Mick Jones and Terry Thomas
- Recording Engineers – Rafe McKenna (Tracks 1, 3, 5–8 & 10); Andrew Scarth (Tracks 2, 4 & 9).
- Assistant Engineers – Bruce Calder, Ellen Fitton, Michael Gilbert, Lolly Grodner, John Herman, Jon Mallison and Bernhard Speyer.
- Mixing – Mick Jones and Terry Thomas (All tracks); Rafe McKenna (Tracks 1, 3, 5–8 & 10); Andrew Scarth (Tracks 2, 4 & 9).
- Mastered by Ted Jensen at Sterling Sound (New York, NY).
- Art Direction – Reiner Design Consultants
- Photography – Timothy White
- Art Direction for band photography – Bob Defrin
- Management – Bud Prager for E.S.P. Management, Inc.

== Charts ==
=== Weekly charts ===
Chart (1991)	Peak position
Australian Albums (ARIA)	102
Austrian Albums (Ö3 Austria)	30
Canada Top Albums/CDs (RPM)	50
Dutch Albums (Album Top 100)	70
Finnish Albums (The Official Finnish Charts)	39
German Albums (Offizielle Top 100)	13
Japanese Albums (Oricon)	74
Norwegian Albums (VG-lista)	18
Swedish Albums (Sverigetopplistan)	40
Swiss Albums (Schweizer Hitparade)	8
UK Albums (Official Charts)	56
US Billboard 200	117

=== Year-end charts ===
Chart (1991)	Position
Swiss Albums (Schweizer Hitparade)	40
