= Women (Foreigner song) =

Single by Foreigner

from the album Head Games
- B-side: "The Modern Day"
- Released: February 1980 (US); April 25, 1980 (UK)
- Recorded: 1979
- Genre: Hard rock
- Length: 3:25
- Label: Atlantic
- Songwriter: Mick Jones
- Producers: Roy Thomas Baker, Mick Jones, Ian McDonald

Foreigner singles chronology
"Love on the Telephone" (1979)	"Women" (1980)	"I'll Get Even with You" (1980)

"Women" is the fourth single taken from the third album, Head Games by the band, Foreigner. It was written by Mick Jones, and released in February 1980. The song's B-side, "The Modern Day" is also sung by its writer, Jones.

== Reception ==
Billboard praised the "strong vocals and hot guitar licks" but criticized the womanizing lyrics. Cash Box said that "slashing lead guitars...lead the way into the hardcore boogie beat, with Lou Gramm's rough 'n' tumble vocals, for another pop, AOR winner." Record World said that the song "rocks hard with buzzsaw guitar and steamy vocals." Rolling Stone critic David Fricke described it as a "presumably tongue-in-cheek misogynous chant" that is "powered by guitarist-songwriter Mick Jones' jackhammer riffing and Dennis Elliott's ham-fisted drumming" but "free of...pomp-art, heavy-metal flourishes." St. Joseph News-Press critic Conrad Bibens identified "Women" as being a "departure from the band's style" and described the song as "a bluesy track similar to some of Steve Miller's recent works."

A music video was filmed to accompany the single (an early example of music video, about two years before MTV) that featured several models and actresses dressed like and acting in the manner of the various female stereotypes that the song mentions, one of whom was Victoria Lynn Johnson, who was the 1977 Penthouse magazine Pet Of The Year.

Daily Republican Register critic Mike Bishop called "Women" the "dumbest song" on Head Games, highlighting the lyrics "Women behind bars / Women in fast cars / Women in distress / Women in no dress." Livingston County Daily Press and Argus critic Scott Pohl found the lyrics of the song to be chauvinistic and unattractive as a "tale of how awful things can get when you deal with women." On the other hand, Democrat and Chronicle arts editor Jack Garner called "Women" the most interesting song on Head Games, despite its seemingly simple structure. Garner wrote that it:

...consists of a long series of phrases describing a large variety of women ("Women who satisfy. Women you can't buy. Women in magazines. Women in a limousine.") There isn't a completed sentence in the lyric. Such a repeated phrase structure could be dangerous, but [Lou] Gramm brings it the necessary interest and vitality through his well-phrased vocal.

Press-Enterprise critic Kim McNally used a similar verse to illustrate that the song's words have force, and was relieved that, unlike most other songs on Head Games, the lyrics to "Women" are not simply "you-me-ooh-baby-you." She said that the music sounds like the Cars. PopMatters critic Evan Sawdey said that "'Women' had a strut that was absent from past two Foreigner [albums]." But News-Journal critic Ralph Kisiel said that the music "sounds like your baby brother took the needle of your stereo and scraped it across the record."

== Band reaction ==
Responding to criticism of the song's lyrics in 1979, lead singer Lou Gramm said that the song uses female stereotypes in a way that "couldn't be more tongue-in-cheek." In 2014, Jones similarly said "You know, it was supposed to be a fun song, tongue-in-cheek a little bit – but yeah, it’s one of the band’s favorite songs to play. Throughout all of the years, it always comes up, you know, the fans bring it up sometimes. There’s certainly a nice little strut to it."

Foreigner revived the song in concert in 2026 and then lead singer said "We are trying to add more songs in the set from all Foreigner albums,” he wrote. “For instance, we just performed ‘Women’ and we had a blast!! It was never before performed live and we felt, why not?". Through June 2026, Foreigner had played the song live 31 times, mostly between 1979 and 1982. Gramm also performed the song live 3 times as a solo artist between 2005 and 2007.

== Chart performance ==
"Women" reached No. 41 on the Billboard Hot 100.
