= Feels Like the First Time =

Single by Foreigner

from the album Foreigner
- B-side: "Woman Oh Woman"
- Released: March 1977
- Recorded: 1976
- Genre: Rock; hard rock
- Length: 3:15 (single version); 3:49 (album version)
- Label: Atlantic
- Songwriter: Mick Jones
- Producers: Gary Lyons; John Sinclair

Foreigner singles chronology
"Feels Like the First Time" (1977)	"Cold as Ice" (1977)

Music video
- "Feels Like the First Time" on YouTube

"Feels Like the First Time" is the debut single by British-American rock band Foreigner. It was written by Mick Jones and released in 1977 from the band's eponymous debut album. It reached No. 4 on the Billboard Hot 100.

== Background ==
Jones wrote "Feels Like the First Time" while putting together the band that would become Foreigner. According to Jones, "I started writing by myself. Before I knew it, I had two or three songs, and I wondered what to do with them. One of those songs was 'Feels Like the First Time.'"

Jones also said:

"Feels Like The First Time" was written about a bit of a change in my life. I was coming out of a previous marriage with somebody I'd met in France. I'd gone back to England and then finally made the journey to America while I was in the band Spooky Tooth. And to me it was this challenge of really going for a new start in my life. ... to me it was signifying a new start. I'd met somebody, I got re-married and moved with her to America, and that was the song that described that experience."

"Feels Like the First Time" was one of four songs (along with "Take Me to Your Leader," "At War with the World" and "Woman, Oh Woman") that Lou Gramm sang at his audition to become the lead singer of Foreigner. These same four songs were used on the demo Foreigner used to get their recording contract.

== Composition and style ==
The track incorporates elements of electronic music. Billboard called "Feels Like the First Time" "tasteful, high energy rock" with "a direct, happy, love lyric." Billboard called the guitars "booming" and Gramm's lead vocal "intense but controlled." Cash Box said that "the heavy rock feeling is there at bottom, but glittering backing vocals and keyboard work add the patina necessary to soothe top 40" and also commented on the "spine-tingling guitar chords" that open the song. Record World said that Foreigner "has elegantly captured the magic of power pop with their first effort."

Rolling Stone critic Dave Marsh said the song "combines Roxy Music-like synthesizer with the eternal thump." New York Times critic John Rockwell called the song a "none-too-imaginative" example of a "straightforward rock song" that combines "latter-day British rock with a hint of synthesizer progressiveness." AllMusic critic Denise Sullivan described "Feels Like the First Time" as "one of those typically generic, much reviled by critics, '70s corporate rock hits" which nonetheless had "insta-appeal."

== Critical reception ==
Rolling Stone critic Dave Marsh said that Jones' songwriting on the song and its follow-up single "Cold as Ice" "places him among the better English hard-rock writers." Henry McNulty's contemporary review of Foreigner in the Hartford Courant said that "Feels Like the First Time" was a good choice for the album's first single due to "Jones' guitar blasting out metal-tinged chords at the outset and plenty of clever little hooks."

Sullivan attributed its popularity in part to its ability to bridge between heavy metal and MOR rock, with "hard-hitting" snare drum, "layered instruments and fist-pumping guitar riffs." She describes lead singer Gramm as turning in a "blueprint metal screamer vocal performance." Livingston County Daily Press and Argus critic Scott Pohl said the song "expressed how anyone feels with a new lover."

Ultimate Classic Rock critic Matt Wardlaw ranked "Feels Like the First Time" as Foreigner's 7th greatest song, stating that it represented a new beginning for Jones "as he had gotten married, moved to America and started what would become a very successful rock 'n' roll band." Classic Rock History critic Brian Kachejian ranked "Feels Like the First Time" as Foreigner's all-time top song. Billboard reviewer Gary Graff rated "Feels Like the First Time" to be Foreigner's 3rd greatest song, calling it "a perfect introduction and statement of purpose, brimming with optimism and intent."

== In popular culture ==
In 2010, "Feels Like the First Time" was re-recorded to be included in the rhythm game Guitar Hero: Warriors of Rock.

The song appears at the end of the 2012 film Magic Mike and was also used during the Riff Medley by the Treblemakers in the movie Pitch Perfect. It was also featured in the 2013 film Anchorman 2, the 2017 film I, Tonya, and the end credits of the 2021 film Eternals. A heavily edited version appears in the 2020 Netflix movie Spenser Confidential.

== Chart performance ==
=== Weekly charts ===
Chart (1977)	Peak position
Australia (KMR)	41
Canada Top Singles (RPM)	7
UK	39
U.S. Billboard Hot 100	4
U.S. Cash Box Top 100	5

=== Year-end charts ===
Chart (1977)	Rank
Canada	79
U.S. Billboard Hot 100	31
U.S. Cash Box	34

== Personnel ==
- Lou Gramm – lead vocals
- Mick Jones – lead guitar, backing vocals
- Ian McDonald – rhythm guitar, backing vocals
- Al Greenwood – keyboards, Hammond organ, synthesizer
- Ed Gagliardi – bass guitar, backing vocals
- Dennis Elliott – drums
