= Head Games (album) =

Studio album by Foreigner
- Released: September 11, 1979
- Recorded: June – July 1979
- Studios: Atlantic (New York); Cherokee (Hollywood)
- Genre: Hard rock
- Length: 38:12
- Label: Atlantic
- Producers: Roy Thomas Baker; Mick Jones; Ian McDonald

Foreigner chronology
Double Vision (1978)	Head Games (1979)	4 (1981)

Singles from Head Games
- 1. "Dirty White Boy" Released: August 1979; 2. "Head Games" Released: November 1979; 3. "Women" Released: February 1980; 4. "Love on the Telephone" Released: February 1980 (NL); 5. "I'll Get Even with You" Released: September 1980 (UK)

Head Games is the third studio album by the British-American rock band Foreigner, released on September 11, 1979, by Atlantic Records. Recorded at Atlantic Studios in New York, with additional recording and whole mixing taking place at Cherokee Studios in Los Angeles, it was the only Foreigner album co-produced by Roy Thomas Baker, best known for working on Queen's classic albums. It marked the first appearance of new bass guitarist Rick Wills (formerly of Jokers Wild, Roxy Music and Small Faces) who replaced Ed Gagliardi (who was fired from the band), and was the last album with founding members Ian McDonald and Al Greenwood, who would leave the band after the following tour. Head Games is also the last Foreigner album to feature a lead vocal by guitarist Mick Jones ("The Modern Day").

== Cover art ==
The model in the photograph on the front cover is American actress and film producer Lisanne Falk. The cover art was criticized by feminists, but according to Foreigner lead singer Lou Gramm, the cover was intended to be cute, like a cartoon. Gramm said "The girl is being naughty, erasing graffiti [in the restroom]. She's looking at whoever buys the album, she's been caught." According to Miami Herald critic Bill Ashton, the cover art is a play on the album title Head Games. Atlantic Records publicity director Stuart Ginsburg pointed out that "head is a naval term for bathroom" and Foreigner's media coordinator Susan Steinberg stated that "the girl on the cover is shocked by the graffiti. It's not like somebody is attacking her. I swear to you, it's not premeditated."

== Release ==
In August 1979, the release of the album was preceded by its first single, the hard rock song "Dirty White Boy", which peaked at number 12 on the Billboard Hot 100 chart. The album itself continued Foreigner's popularity, climbing to number 5 on the Billboard 200 chart and receiving a Platinum certification four months after it hit the stores. As of 2017, Head Games has gained a 5× Platinum status for selling at least 5 million copies in the United States. The next singles were the title track and "Women", which reached number 14 and 41, respectively.

== Critical reception ==
Professional ratings
Review scores
Source	Rating
AllMusic	3/5 stars
Christgau's Record Guide	C
The Encyclopedia of Popular Music	3/5 stars
MusicHound Rock: The Essential Album Guide	3/5 stars
(The New) Rolling Stone Album Guide	3/5 stars

The New York Times wrote that "the group settles comfortably into the hard-driving, macho-posturing idiom so common to many other teen heavy metal bands." The Democrat and Chronicle determined that Head Games "is strongest when it rocks hard and nasty." The Richmond Times-Dispatch concluded that the album "serves mainly to remind us that commercially hot rock bands are loath to change what got them hot in the first place." The San Bernardino County Sun opined that "Foreigner has maintained a quality control, and Head Games is the band's third impressive album in a row."

Ultimate Classic Rock critic Eduardo Rivadavia rated three of the songs from Head Games – "Dirty White Boy", "Rev on the Red Line" and "I'll Get Even with You" – among Foreigner's 10 most underrated songs. Rivadavia praises Jones' "sizzling" guitar solo on "Rev on the Red Line", calling it one of the band's best b-sides. Classic Rock critic Malcolm Dome rated two songs from Head Games as being among Foreigner's 10 most underrated – "Rev on the Red Line" at #10 and "Dirty White Boy" at #3. Dome particularly praised the "sublime melody", Lou Gramm's vocal performance and the way all the musicians "show their skills, without ever showing off" on "Rev on the Red Line". One the other hand, PopMatters critic Evan Sawdey called "Rev on the Red Line" "paint-by-numbers rock". Billboard reviewer Gary Graff rated "Seventeen" to be Foreigner's ninth greatest song, calling it a "hidden gem".

== Track listing ==
Side one
No.	Title	Writer(s)	Length
1.	"Dirty White Boy"	Mick Jones; Lou Gramm	3:38
2.	"Love on the Telephone"	Jones; Gramm	3:18
3.	"Women"	Jones	3:24
4.	"I'll Get Even with You"	Jones	3:40
5.	"Seventeen"	Jones; Gramm	4:36

Side two
No.	Title	Writer(s)	Length
6.	"Head Games"	Gramm; Jones	3:37
7.	"The Modern Day"	Jones	3:26
8.	"Blinded by Science"	Jones	4:55
9.	"Do What You Like"	Ian McDonald; Gramm	3:59
10.	"Rev on the Red Line"	Al Greenwood; Gramm	3:35
Total length:			38:12

2002 Rhino Records remastered edition bonus track
No.	Title	Writer(s)	Length
11.	"Zalia"	McDonald; Gramm	2:34
Total length:			40:50

== Personnel ==
Foreigner

- Lou Gramm – lead vocals, percussion
- Mick Jones – lead guitar, piano, backing vocals, lead vocals (7)
- Ian McDonald – guitars, keyboards, backing vocals
- Al Greenwood – keyboards, synthesizers
- Rick Wills – bass, backing vocals
- Dennis Elliott – drums

Production

- Mick Jones – producer
- Ian McDonald – producer
- Roy Thomas Baker – producer
- Geoff Workman – engineer
- John Weaver – assistant engineer
- George Marino – mastering at Sterling Sound (New York, NY)
- Ted Jensen – 1995 digital remastering at Sterling Sound (New York)
- Dan Hersch – 2002 digital remastering
- Shawn R. Britton – 2013 MFSL mastering at Mobile Fidelity Sound Lab (Sebastopol, California)
- Sandi Young – art direction
- Chris Callis – front cover photo
- David Alexander – back cover photo
- William Coupon – booklet photos

== Charts ==
Chart (1979)	Peak position
Australian Albums (Kent Music Report)	45
Canada Top Albums/CDs (RPM)	5
German Albums (Offizielle Top 100)	39
Japanese Albums (Oricon)	34
New Zealand Albums (RMNZ)	38
US Billboard 200	5

Chart (2026)	Peak position
Hungarian Physical Albums (MAHASZ)	5
Hungarian Vinyl Albums (MAHASZ)	6

== Certifications ==
Region	Certification	Certified units/sales
Canada (Music Canada)	Platinum	100,000^{^}
Japan (RIAJ)	Gold	100,000^{^}
United States (RIAA)	5× Platinum	5,000,000^{^}
^{^} Shipments figures based on certification alone.
