= Dirty White Boy (song) =

Single by Foreigner

from the album Head Games
- B-side: "Rev on the Red Line"
- Released: August 1979
- Recorded: early 1979
- Genre: Hard rock
- Length: 3:13 (single version); 3:37 (album version)
- Label: Atlantic
- Songwriters: Lou Gramm; Mick Jones
- Producers: Roy Thomas Baker; Mick Jones; Ian McDonald

Foreigner singles chronology
"Blue Morning, Blue Day" (1979)	"Dirty White Boy" (1979)	"Head Games" (1979)

Music video
- "Dirty White Boy" on YouTube

"Dirty White Boy" is a song recorded by British-American rock band Foreigner, written by Lou Gramm and Mick Jones, and produced by Roy Thomas Baker, Jones, and Ian McDonald. It was the first single taken from the band's third studio album, Head Games (1979). The B-side, "Rev on the Red Line" has also proven to be very popular among fans, but was never released as an A-side. Lou Gramm's trademark scream at the end of the song is missing from this abbreviated version of "Dirty White Boy". The song spent nine weeks in the Top 40.

== Background ==
Jones has claimed that the song was about Elvis Presley, adding that "he always was that dirty white boy who changed the shape of music completely. It was talking about the kind of heritage that he left, and I think that had an effect on all the musicians that came after, like Mick Jagger - he was also a dirty white boy. Elvis paved the way for all that." However, some listeners misinterpreted the song as a "crypto-racist statement." Gramm said of the controversy it's "a song about an irresponsible kid, not a racial song."

== Critical reception ==
Billboard described "Dirty White Boy" as "a driving guitar/bass propelled rocker spearheaded by a forceful lead vocal and tight harmonic support." Billboard also claimed that production generated a "gritty rock edge." Cash Box called it a "bone-crunching rocker" with a "high-stepping bass line," "fiery guitar chording" and "piercing vocals." Record World said that "Gramm's definitive rock vocals quiver and cry over a racehorse rhythm on this can't-miss cut." Rolling Stone critic David Fricke said that it is "powered by guitarist-songwriter Mick Jones' jackhammer riffing and Dennis Elliott's ham-fisted drumming" but "free of.., pomp-art, heavy-metal flourishes."

Daily Republican Register critic Mike Bishop called it a "likable song" but said that its guitar riffs are similar to Foreigner's earlier song "Hot Blooded." The Fort Worth Star Telegram rated it to be the 7th best single of 1979. But in a contemporary review, The Charlotte News critic Chris Jones felt that the song was the weakest song Foreigner had recorded to date, particularly noting that the lyrics repeat the phrase "dirty white boy" 20 times over three and half minutes.

Ultimate Classic Rock critic Eduardo Rivadavia rated "Dirty White Boy" as Foreigner's most underrated song. Classic Rock critic Malcolm Dome rated it as the band's 3rd most underrated song, calling it "a breezing rock'n'roller" that was "inspired by Elvis Presley and his impact on music," and saying that "it moves along at a high pace, and is blessed with a distinctly distorted solo from Jones."

== Track listing ==
- 7" single
1. "Dirty White Boy" – 3:13
2. "Rev on the Red Line" – 3:35

== Personnel ==
- Lou Gramm – lead vocals
- Mick Jones – lead guitar, backing vocals
- Ian McDonald – rhythm guitar, backing vocals
- Al Greenwood – keyboards
- Dennis Elliott – drums
- Rick Wills – bass guitar, vocals

== Chart performance ==
Chart (1979)	Peak position
Canadian RPM Top Singles	14
US Billboard Hot 100	12
