= Head Games (song) =

Single by Foreigner

from the album Head Games
- B-side: "Do What You Like"
- Released: November 2, 1979 (US); February 29, 1980 (UK)
- Recorded: Early 1979
- Genre: Hard rock
- Length: 3:26 (single version); 3:37 (album version)
- Label: Atlantic
- Songwriters: Lou Gramm, Mick Jones
- Producers: Roy Thomas Baker, Mick Jones, Ian McDonald

Foreigner singles chronology
"Dirty White Boy" (1979)	"Head Games" (1979)	"Love on the Telephone" (1979)

Music video
- "Head Games" on YouTube

"Head Games" is the title-cut and second single taken from the band Foreigner's third release. It was written by Lou Gramm and Mick Jones, and released primarily in the U.S. in November 1979 while at the same time, "Love on the Telephone" was being released elsewhere. The song's b-side, "Do What You Like" uses multi-layered harmony vocals along the lines of their earlier single, "Cold as Ice".

== Background ==
The lyrics of "Head Games" "express anguish and disappointment over a love affair. Salt Lake Tribune staff writer Terry Orme said that "the message of 'Head Games'...is identical to 'Cold as Ice' – a banal, sleazy claim of unrequited love."

== Reception ==
Billboard described "Head Games" as a "kick it out rocker" and described Gramm's vocals as "expressive" and Jones' guitar playing as "searing." Cash Box called it a "rock anthem [that] builds at a steady pace" and said that "Lou Gramm's vocal is at its aggressive peak." Record World said that "Gramm's snarling vocals & a relentless rhythm equal a tense, driving AOR-pop pick."

Daily Republican Register critic Mike Bishop called out the song's lyrics as being "silly" and praised Al Greenwood's keyboards, although said that the riffs seem to be borrowed from Foreigner's earlier song "Double Vision." Press-Enterprise critic Kim McNally described it as a "'you and me baby, I can't take it anymore' number" and found it to be "ponderous." The Fort Worth Star Telegram rated it to be the 3rd best single of 1979, behind the Babys' "Every Time I Think of You" and Cheap Trick's "Voices."

Ultimate Classic Rock critic Matt Wardlaw rated it as Foreigner's 8th greatest song, saying that "a soaring opening riff from Jones leads into urgent lyrical communication from Gramm, who struggles to figure out and face the true mental reality of his fractious relationship."

"Head Games" reached number 14 on the charts of both the U.S. and Canada

== Personnel ==
- Lou Gramm – lead vocals
- Mick Jones – lead guitar, backing vocals
- Ian McDonald – rhythm guitar, backing vocals
- Al Greenwood – keyboards
- Rick Wills – bass guitar, backing vocals
- Dennis Elliott – drums

== Chart history ==
Chart (1979–80)	Peak position
Canada RPM Top Singles	14
US Billboard Hot 100	14
US Cash Box Top 100	12

== In popular culture ==
The song was featured in the first episode of web television series Cobra Kai, when protagonist Johnny Lawrence drives whilst drunk and reminisces about his teenage years.
