= Cold as Ice =

Single by Foreigner

from the album Foreigner
- B-side: "I Need You"
- Released: July 1977
- Recorded: 1976
- Genre: Synth-rock
- Length: 3:18 (single version); 3:23 (album version)
- Label: Atlantic
- Songwriters: Lou Gramm, Mick Jones
- Producers: Gary Lyons, John Sinclair

Foreigner singles chronology
"Feels Like the First Time" (1977)	"Cold as Ice" (1977)	"Long, Long Way from Home" (1977)

Music video
- "Cold as Ice" on YouTube

"Cold as Ice" is a 1977 song written by Lou Gramm and Mick Jones that was first released by British-American rock band Foreigner from their eponymous debut album. It became one of the best-known songs of the band in the US, peaking at No. 6 on the Billboard Hot 100. It was initially the B-side of some versions of the "Feels Like the First Time" 45 rpm single.

The single release is a few seconds shorter than the album version, but adds some orchestration (in the form of horns and strings at subtle levels).

== Background ==
"Cold as Ice" was a replacement for a song that was intended for Foreigner but which producer Gary Lyons didn't feel fit the album (Ian McDonald believes the replaced song may have been "Take Me to Your Leader"). According to Jones "I went home after Gary said this, sat down at my piano and out came the riff for Cold As Ice. And the rest of the song flowed from there.” Lyons said that “When I got back, they played me Cold As Ice and it worked for me. So we went into Atlantic Studios one night to cut it.” According to McDonald, “Gary and I were in there all night working on the vocals. And when we got out of the studio we discovered that a blizzard had been raging. Everywhere was covered in snow, and we heard on the radio that it had been coldest night in New York on record! Somehow that seemed to be a good omen for the song.”

Jones has also said of the subject:

Lyrically, the subject was based on the idea of the stereotypical cold-hearted, bad girl – the sort of woman Joan Crawford would play in a film – but it wasn’t aimed at anyone specific. Well, there was one girl at school that dumped me, so maybe that trauma stayed with me over the years and subconsciously filtered in! The other contributing factor was that it was about minus 20 degrees in New York at the time we were writing it, which may have fed into the atmosphere.

Salt Lake Tribune staff writer Terry Orme characterised the message of "Cold as Ice" as "a banal, sleazy claim of unrequited love".

== Reception ==
Billboard described "Cold as Ice" as having a "haunting feel" and a "surrealistic chilling effect" produced by its "richly textured instrumentals and gutsy vocals". Billboard also praised how the song maintains its momentum and intensity. Cash Box said that "listeners will recognize the controlled fury of Lou Gramm's lead vocal as well as the finely textured harmonies" and that "the orchestra lends an expansive effect". In a contemporary review, music critic Dave Marsh said that Jones' songwriting on this song and its predecessor single "Feels Like the First Time" "places him among the better English hard-rock writers." Henry McNulty's contemporary review of Foreigner in the Hartford Courant called "Cold as Ice" his favorite song on the album, saying it "is propelled by [Dennis] Elliott's drums – they carry the song in the best rock manner – but the interplay between [Lou] Gramm's lead vocal and [Al] Greenwood's electronic keyboard is what raises this from the rock pile."

Classic Rock History critic Brian Kachejian ranked "Cold as Ice" as Foreigner's 4th greatest song, stating that the piano hook that opens the song "will always go down as one of the signature riffs in classic rock history." Similarly, Ultimate Classic Rock critic Matt Wardlaw ranked it as Foreigner's 5th greatest song, wondering about how it could have been used as a b-side in some countries given its "famous piano beginning". Billboard reviewer Gary Graff rated "Cold as Ice" to be Foreigner's 6th greatest song, praising the "insistent, pounding piano", the "full-bodied verses", and "faux operatic backing vocals", and calling the song "a rock-cum-pop classic and a diss track with enough lyrical bite to make most rappers proud."

Jones has rated it as one of his eleven favorite Foreigner songs, saying that it was the first song he wrote and recorded on the piano.

== Charts ==
=== Weekly charts ===
Chart (1977)	Peak position
Australia Kent Music Report	32
Belgium (Ultratop)	20
Canada Top Singles (RPM)	9
Dutch Top 40	13
US Billboard Hot 100	6
US Cash Box Top 100	10

Chart (1978)	Peak position
UK Singles Chart	24

Chart (1985)	Peak position
Irish Singles Chart	18

=== Year-end charts ===
Chart (1977)	Rank
Canada	89
US Billboard Hot 100	68
US Cash Box Top 100	42

== Certifications ==
Region	Certification	Certified units/sales
New Zealand (RMNZ)	Platinum	30,000^{‡}
United Kingdom (BPI)	Silver	200,000^{‡}
United States (RIAA)	Gold	500,000^{‡}
^{‡} Sales+streaming figures based on certification alone.

== Personnel ==
- Lou Gramm – lead vocals
- Mick Jones – lead guitar, backing vocals, piano
- Ian McDonald – rhythm guitar, backing vocals
- Al Greenwood – Hammond organ, synthesizer, Orchestron
- Ed Gagliardi – bass guitar, backing vocals
- Dennis Elliott – drums

=== Guest musicians ===
- Ian Lloyd – backing vocals

== In popular culture ==
"Cold as Ice" was used as the soundtrack for a skit on the March 25, 1978 broadcast of Saturday Night Live that showed a man being attacked by a woman in a number of grisly ways. Host Christopher Lee introduced the segment as being "not for the squeamish". Will Arnett plays the song on the piano in character as G.O.B. Bluth on the show Arrested Development.

In 2000, hip hop duo M.O.P. sampled "Cold as Ice" for their song of the same name.

In 2002, an episode of the Adult Swim animated series Aqua Teen Hunger Force referenced the song, as well as other songs by Foreigner. Rapper B.o.B interpolated the song on a track also named "Cold as Ice" from his 2010 mixtape, No Genre.

In 2019, the song was used in Stranger Things third season episode 2 when Eleven breaks up with her boyfriend Mike Wheeler.
