= Foreigner (band) =

British-American rock band

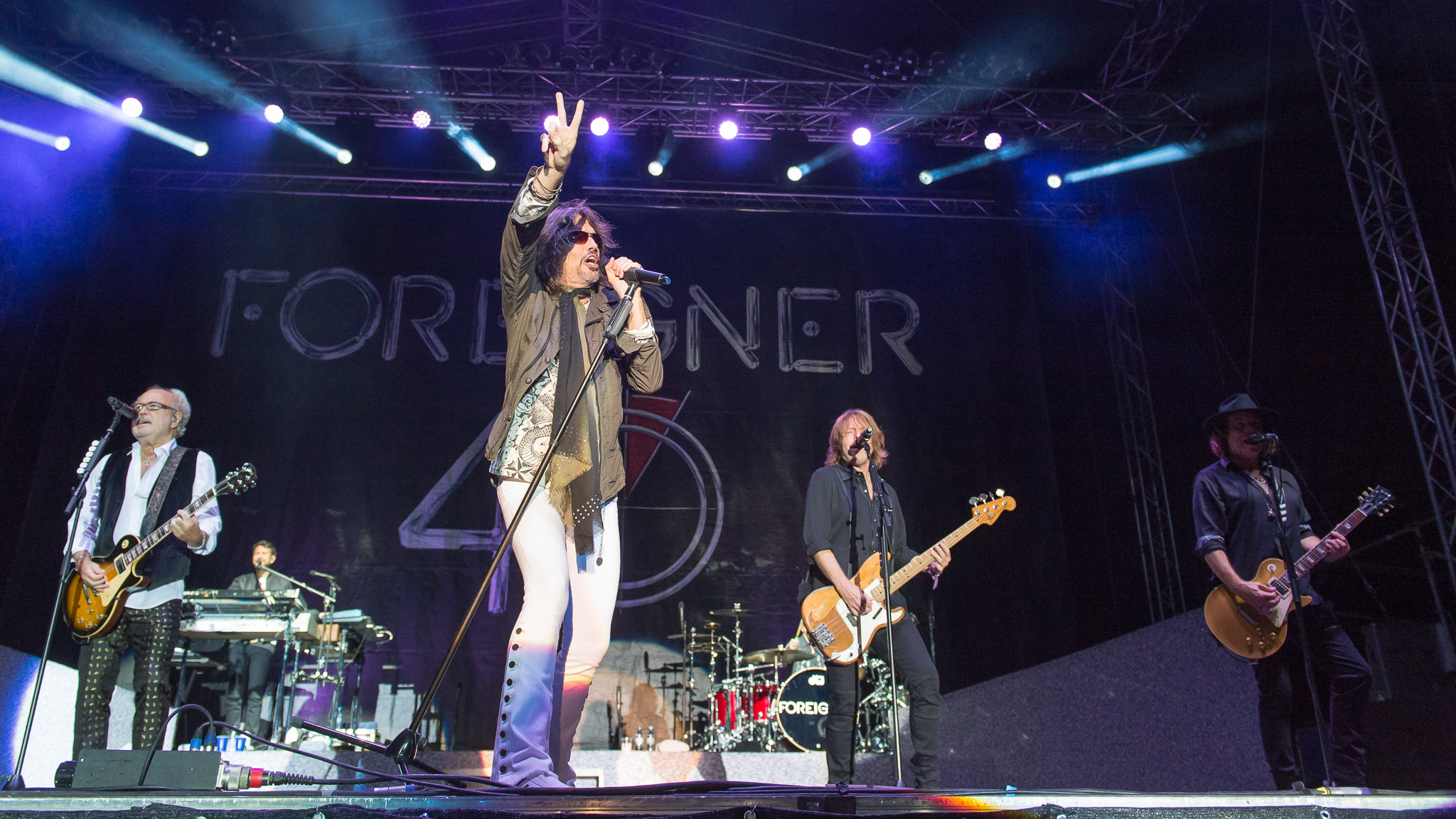
- Foreigner performing in 2016

Background information
- Origin: New York City, U.S.
- Genres: Hard rock; soft rock; arena rock
- Works: Discography
- Years active: 1976–present (Note: On hiatus: 2003–2004)
- Labels: Atlantic; Rhino; Rhythm Safari
- Spinoffs: Spys; Shadow King
- Members: Mick Jones; Jeff Pilson; Michael Bluestein; Chris Frazier; Bruce Watson; Luis Maldonado; John Roth
- Past members: Lou Gramm; Dennis Elliott; Al Greenwood; Ian McDonald; Ed Gagliardi; Rick Wills; Johnny Edwards; Thom Gimbel; Jeff Jacobs; Mark Schulman; Bruce Turgon; Brian Tichy; Kelly Hansen; Jason Bonham
- Website: foreigneronline.com

Foreigner is a British-American rock band formed in New York City in 1976. The band's original lineup consisted of vocalist Lou Gramm, guitarist Mick Jones, drummer Dennis Elliott, keyboardist Al Greenwood, multi-instrumentalist Ian McDonald (formerly of King Crimson) and bassist Ed Gagliardi. Gagliardi was replaced by Rick Wills in 1979. Foreigner is one of the best-selling bands of all time, with worldwide sales exceeding 80 million records, including 38 million in the US.

Jones came up with the band name because he, Elliott, and McDonald were British, while Gramm, Greenwood and Gagliardi were American, meaning at least half the members would be considered foreigners regardless of the country they were in. In 1977, Foreigner released its self-titled debut album, the first of six consecutive albums to be certified multi-platinum and reach the Top 10 in the US. The album produced two US Top 10 singles, "Feels Like the First Time" and "Cold as Ice". Their 1978 follow-up, Double Vision, was successful and included two more US hits: "Hot Blooded" and the title track.

Foreigner's third album, Head Games (1979), featured US Top 20 singles "Dirty White Boy" and the title track. The band's fourth album, 4 (1981), hit No. 1 for 10 weeks in the US and became their breakthrough album in the UK, where it reached the Top 5. The album produced three hit singles: "Urgent", "Waiting for a Girl Like You", and "Juke Box Hero". Following a 1982 greatest hits album Records, which went 7× platinum in the US, Foreigner released their fifth studio album Agent Provocateur in 1984, which reached No. 1 in the UK and included their biggest hit single, "I Want to Know What Love Is". The song topped the charts in the US, UK, Canada, and Australia, No. 3 in Germany, and the Top 10 in other countries.

After a break, Foreigner released Inside Information in 1987. Despite two more US Top 10 hits with "Say You Will" and "I Don't Want to Live Without You", it became their first album not to achieve multi-platinum certification or reach the Top 10 in the US. A 1992 greatest hits album, The Very Best ... and Beyond achieved 2× platinum certification in the US and gold certification in the UK. Foreigner was inducted into the Rock and Roll Hall of Fame in 2024.

== Band history ==
=== Formation and debut album (1976–1977) ===
Since the band's inception, they have been led by English guitarist Mick Jones, a former member of Nero and the Gladiators, Johnny Hallyday's band, Spooky Tooth, and the Leslie West band. After the collapse of the Leslie West Band in 1976, Jones found himself stranded in New York City. West's manager, Bud Prager, encouraged Jones to continue his songwriting and rehearse a band of his own in some space Prager had near his New York office.

Jones connected with New York keyboardist Al Greenwood, who had recently played with former Flash members Colin Carter and Mike Hough in a group called Storm, drummer Stan Williams, and Louisiana bassist Jay Davis, who later performed with Rod Stewart. They began jamming together. Another friend, Stories singer Ian Lloyd, was brought in to sing; however, Jones decided the chemistry was not quite right and retained only Greenwood as he resumed his search for other players. During a session for Ian Lloyd's album, Jones met transplanted English musician and former King Crimson founding member Ian McDonald. Another session, this one for Ian Hunter, led to his discovery of fellow Brit and drummer Dennis Elliott.

Despite auditioning approximately forty to fifty singers, the group struggled to find the right vocalist until Jones revisited a Black Sheep album given to him backstage at a 1974 Spooky Tooth concert by that group's lead singer, Lou Gramm. Jones reached out to Gramm, who had returned to his hometown of Rochester, New York following Black Sheep's breakup, and sent him a plane ticket to New York City. Gramm proved to be the missing piece, and Brooklyn bassist Ed Gagliardi rounded out the sextet.

A name, "Trigger", was tentatively chosen and appeared on the band's demo tape, but it was rejected by all the record companies that received it. John Kalodner, a former journalist and radio programmer working in A&R at Atlantic Records, noticed a tape labeled Trigger on Atlantic president Jerry L. Greenberg's desk. Kalodner had recently listened to a band called Trigger and realized this was not the same group. He convinced Greenberg that at least one song on the tape had the potential to be a hit and urged him to consider signing the band immediately. Since the name Trigger was already taken, Jones proposed the name Foreigner, inspired by the fact that in any country they performed, at least three members would be foreigners, as Jones, McDonald, and Elliott were English, while Gramm, Greenwood, and Gagliardi were American.

In November 1976, after six months of rehearsals, the newly christened Foreigner began recording their debut album with producers John Sinclair and Gary Lyons at The Hit Factory. However, they later moved to Atlantic Recording Studios to finish recording the basic tracks and complete the overdubs. The initial mixing took place at Sarm Studios in London, but the band was dissatisfied with the results. They opted to remix the album at Atlantic with the involvement of Mick Jones, Ian McDonald, and Jimmy Douglass. Bud Prager signed on as the band's manager and remained in that role for the next 17 years.

The band's debut album, Foreigner, was released in March 1977 and achieved significant commercial success. It was certified for sales of five million copies in the United States, remaining in the top 20 for a year and peaking at No. 4. The album also reached the top 10 in Canada and Australia and climbed to No. 1 in Norway. Foreigner produced three major hits in North America: "Feels Like the First Time" reached No. 4 in the US and No. 7 in Canada, "Cold as Ice" peaked at No. 6 in the US and No. 9 in Canada, and "Long, Long Way from Home" hit No. 20. Additionally, "Cold as Ice" saw moderate success in the UK, Australia, the Netherlands, and Belgium, reaching the top 20 or 30 in those countries.

=== 1977–1990 ===
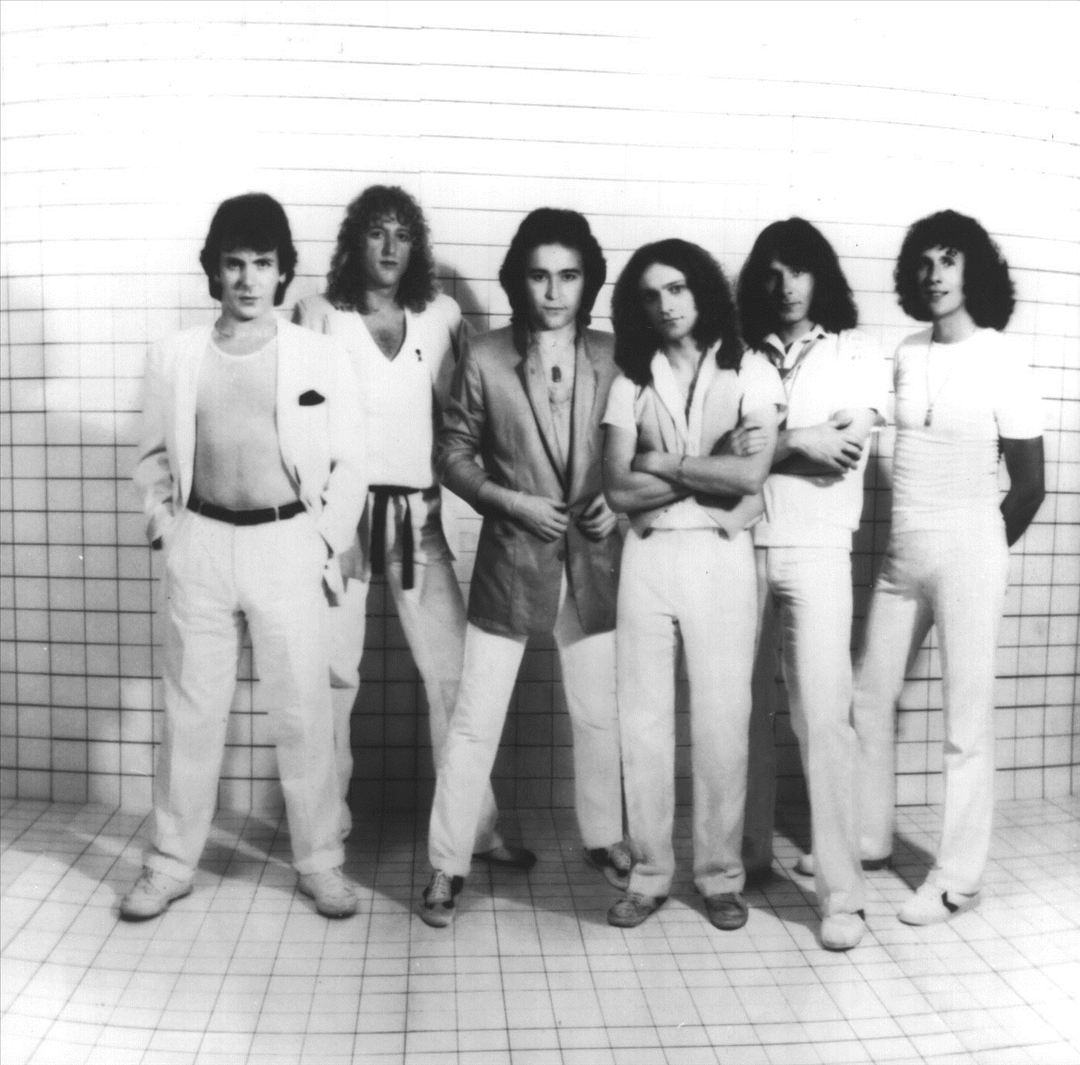
Foreigner in a 1979 publicity shot for their album Head Games

By May 1977, Foreigner was already headlining theaters and had earned a gold record for their debut album. Shortly afterward, the band began selling out U.S. basketball arenas and hockey rinks. Following a show at Memorial Hall in Kansas City, Kansas, on May 6, 1977, drummer Dennis Elliott injured his hand. The band brought in Ian Wallace (formerly of King Crimson) to assist Elliott by playing alongside him on some dates until his hand healed.

After nearly a year on the road, Foreigner performed for more than 200,000 people at California Jam II on March 18, 1978. The following month, they embarked on their first tour of Europe, Japan, and Australia.

Their second album, Double Vision, was released in June 1978 and co-produced by Keith Olsen. The album surpassed their debut in sales, achieving seven million copies sold in the US and peaking at No. 3 in both the US and Canada. In Australia, it reached No. 13. It became the band's first album to chart in the UK, where it peaked at No. 32. However, Double Vision (as well as their next two albums) failed to chart in Norway, where their debut had reached No. 1.

The album generated even greater hits in North America than their debut, with "Hot Blooded" reaching No. 3 in both the US and Canada, the title track "Double Vision" peaking at No. 2 in the US and No. 7 in Canada, and "Blue Morning, Blue Day" climbing to No. 15 and No. 21 respectively. Outside North America, only "Hot Blooded" made an impact, reaching No. 24 in Australia. The singles from Double Vision and their subsequent album, Head Games, saw little airplay or sales in other countries.

Album number three, Head Games, released in September 1979, was co-produced by Roy Thomas Baker. The album was described by Gramm as their "grainiest" album and was commercially successful, in part due to the success of the single "Dirty White Boy" and the title track "Head Games". Both songs were top 15 hits in the US and Canada but did not chart in other countries. The album reached No. 5 in North America, but sales declined significantly in Australia (No. 45) with no improvement in other markets.

For Head Games, bassist Ed Gagliardi was replaced by Englishman Rick Wills. In his autobiography, Juke Box Hero (named after the iconic Foreigner song), Gramm explained the reasons for the band's decision to part ways with Gagliardi: "He was a little headstrong and had his own ideas that weren't always compatible with what we were trying to accomplish. Ed was obstinate at times, playing the song the way he wanted to play it rather than the way it was drawn up. Mick often had to stop sessions to get Ed back on track. After a while, it became tiresome and slowed down the recording process." Gramm also expressed disappointment with Head Games, stating that he felt it sounded unfinished. The album sold about two million copies fewer than its predecessor.

In September 1980 founding members Al Greenwood and Ian McDonald were dismissed. One reason for the dismissal was Jones's desire for greater control over the band and to be the primary songwriter (along with Gramm). In his book, Gramm discussed this challenging period: "The chemistry that made the band right in the beginning didn't necessarily mean it would always be right. I think a pretty major communication lapse appeared, and I don't think anybody really knew what anybody was feeling — the deep, inner belief about the direction of the band and how we were progressing. We had reached a point where there was a lot of dissatisfaction."

In the liner notes for the 2000 release, Juke Box Heroes: The Foreigner Anthology, Jones elaborated further: "Ian McDonald, who I consider a great musician and multi-instrumentalist, began to focus more and more on guitar playing, while I believed his true talent lay more in the dimensional and creative imagery he gave the first two albums. Al Greenwood, our keyboard wiz and a very important part of the Foreigner sound at the beginning, had also started to focus more on songwriting. Although both their contributions to the band had been vital, a conflict was developing about the musical direction of the band. I just felt we needed to clarify it. So Lou, Rick, Dennis, and I made the decision, and that's when we went down to four."

In 1999 McDonald said, "Mick and Lou decided they wanted to be the focus of the band. Mick wanted to make it more apparent that it was his group, so he decided to make a smaller group. That was his decision. I wouldn't have left — I loved the group, it was not my decision." McDonald noted that there was much creative compromise while working in the band and that he did more than he received credit for, much like he did in King Crimson.

McDonald stated, "I had a lot to do with the making of those records and the arrangements and the creating of those songs, more than is probably apparent. I did a lot that went uncredited, which I was happy to do though. When you're in a group, you must contribute as much as you can. I was happy to do that. But as I said, it maybe didn't appear that I was doing as much as I in fact was. I had a lot to do with that group... as well as... Mick Jones, obviously, and everyone else — I'm not trying to take all the credit, but I'm just saying that I was there, I was involved, and I loved it."

The band was now reduced to a quartet, with session players brought in as needed for recording or touring (see below for a complete list of members). Greenwood soon joined Gagliardi to form the AOR band Spys, alongside John Blanco, Billy Milne, and John DiGaudio. The band released two albums, an eponymous debut and the follow-up, Behind Enemy Lines.

In the meantime, Foreigner began work on the next album at Electric Lady Studios in New York City with producer Robert John "Mutt" Lange, engineered by Dave Wittman (currently with Trans-Siberian Orchestra). 4 (released in July 1981) contained the hits "Urgent" (which includes the famous Junior Walker sax solo), "Waiting for a Girl Like You", "Juke Box Hero", and "Break it Up". Thomas Dolby played synthesizers on 4 (he contributed the signature synth sound on "Urgent" and played the intro to "Waiting for a Girl Like You"). 4 became Foreigner's first and only No. 1 album in the US, spending 10 weeks in that position, and peaked at No. 2 in Canada. It also became the band's breakthrough album overseas, reaching the top 5 in the UK, Germany, and Australia.

The first single, "Urgent", peaked at No. 4 on the US Hot 100 and topped the US Album Rock Tracks chart and the Canadian RPM Singles Chart. It also became their biggest hit to date in Germany, reaching the top 15 there, higher than the other singles from the album, but was less successful in Australia, peaking at No. 24, and in the UK, where it did not chart. The second single, "Juke Box Hero", was very successful on rock stations in North America, reaching No. 3 on the US Rock Tracks chart, but only reached No. 26 on the US Hot 100 and No. 39 in Canada, while reaching the top 30 in Germany and France, their first song to chart in the latter. The third single released, the power ballad "Waiting for a Girl Like You", went to No. 2 on the US Hot 100 for a record 10 consecutive weeks and, like "Urgent", topped the US Rock Tracks chart. It also went to No. 2 in Canada and became their first single to reach the top 10 in the UK (No. 8) and Australia (No. 3), while reaching the top 20 in the Netherlands and Belgium and the top 30 in Germany and France.

For their 1981–82 tour in support of 4, the group added Peter Reilich (keyboards, synthesizers, who had played with Gary Wright), former Peter Frampton band member Bob Mayo (keyboards, synthesizers, guitar, backing vocals), and Mark Rivera (sax, flute, keyboards, synthesizers, guitar, backing vocals). Mayo and Rivera had also appeared on the sessions for 4. Reilich was dropped in May 1982, but Mayo and Rivera continued with the band through 1988.

Records (November 1982) was a compilation album spanning the band's first four albums through 1981. This turned out to be the group's best-selling record and was eventually certified 7× platinum by the RIAA.

Foreigner's next album, Agent Provocateur, co-produced by Alex Sadkin, was released in December 1984 and, in 1985, gave them their first and only No. 1 hit song in the US and several other countries (except for Canada, where "Urgent" had reached No. 1) when "I Want to Know What Love Is", a ballad backed by Jennifer Holliday and the New Jersey Mass Choir, topped the charts in the US (both Hot 100 and Rock Tracks), UK, Canada, Australia, New Zealand, Norway, Sweden, and more, while reaching No. 3 in Germany (their only top 10 hit there), No. 4 in France (their only top 20 hit there), and No. 6 in both the Netherlands and Belgium. "That Was Yesterday" was the next single from the album in early 1985 and proved to be another sizable hit, reaching No. 12 on the US Hot 100 (No. 4 on Rock Tracks) and the top 30 in several other countries. The album was equally successful, becoming Foreigner's only No. 1 album in the UK, Germany, and Norway, while reaching No. 3 in Australia (its biggest album there) and Canada, and No. 4 in the US and New Zealand (its biggest album there). It was certified 3× platinum in the US, their lowest-selling album to date in that country.

During their 1985 summer/fall tour, Foreigner appeared at the first Farm Aid on September 22 in Champaign, Illinois.

In between his Foreigner commitments, Jones also started a side career as a producer for albums such as Van Halen's 5150 (1986), Bad Company's Fame and Fortune (1986), and Billy Joel's Storm Front (1989).

In December 1987 Foreigner released Inside Information, spawning hits such as "Say You Will" and "I Don't Want to Live Without You". On May 14, 1988, the band headlined the Atlantic Records 40th Anniversary concert at Madison Square Garden, culminating with "I Want to Know What Love Is", in which the likes of Phil Collins, Crosby, Stills and Nash, Roberta Flack, and other Atlantic artists joined in, singing in the choir. Later during the summer of 1988, the band went back on the road, but touring for Inside Information was limited to Europe, Japan, and Australia. For this tour, Rivera and Mayo were not available, so Larry Oakes (guitar, keyboards, synthesizers, backing vocals) and Lou Cortelezzi (sax) augmented the quartet of Gramm, Jones, Elliott, and Wills.

=== 1990–1992 ===
In the late 1980s, Jones and Gramm each released solo projects on Atlantic. Gramm released Ready or Not in January 1987, and shortly after its release, rehearsals for Foreigner's next album began but stalled due to uncertainty about Gramm's status with the band. However, after the promotional efforts and concert dates for Gramm's album concluded, cooler heads prevailed, and Lou rejoined Foreigner in the studio for Inside Information, which was released at the end of 1987. Jones released Mick Jones in August 1989, followed by Gramm's second solo album, Long Hard Look (October 1989). Gramm decided to leave the group in May 1990 while preparing to tour in support of Long Hard Look as the opener for Steve Miller Band. After completing this tour, Gramm went on to form the short-lived band Shadow King, which released an eponymous album on Atlantic in October 1991.

Meanwhile, Jones was holding auditions for a new singer to replace Gramm. Originally the position was offered to former Airrace and Mama's Boys frontman Keith Murrell, but this fell through as Murrell was under contract as a backing singer to Cliff Richard and Jones was not prepared to wait for him. Following this, American singer Johnny Edwards (Buster Brown, Montrose, King Kobra, Northrup, and Wild Horses), was recruited into the band. Edwards made his first live appearance with Foreigner at the Long Island club Stephen Talkhouse on August 15, 1990, alongside Jones, Dennis Elliott, and Rick Wills, with special guests Terry Thomas on guitar and Eddie Mack on harmonica.

The new lineup of Foreigner released the album Unusual Heat in June 1991. This was their lowest-selling album at the time, peaking at No. 117 on the Billboard 200, although "Lowdown and Dirty" became a minor mainstream rock hit, reaching No. 4 on that chart.

In July 1991 the new lineup of Foreigner played several European dates before making their official U.S. debut on August 9 at the second night of a Billy Joel benefit concert at Deep Hollow Ranch in Montauk, New York, to raise funds for the preservation of Montauk Point Lighthouse.

For their 1991 tour, Jeff Jacobs, who had previously played in Joel's band, was brought in as the new keyboardist, and Mark Rivera returned. During the fall leg of this tour, Elliott chose to leave the band after a concert at The Ritz in NYC on November 14, 1991, to pursue a career as a wood sculptor. Larry Aberman was recruited as a temporary replacement until Mark Schulman joined as drummer in 1992 and stayed for the next three years. Scott Gilman (guitar, sax, flute) joined the touring band in 1992, and Thom Gimbel took over from Gilman and Rivera later in 1992 after they left. When Gimbel joined Aerosmith in 1993, Gilman returned to handle the guitar, sax, and flute duties until Gimbel returned permanently in the spring of 1995.

=== 1992–2003 ===
During the Los Angeles riots, Mick Jones went to the Sunset Marquis Hotel in West Hollywood to meet with Lou Gramm, and they both found themselves sequestered by a city curfew. They decided to use their time together to revive their partnership. "I flew to Los Angeles, during the riots", says Gramm. "We got flown to John Wayne Airport instead of LAX because they were shooting at the planes. Mick and I were holed up in the Sunset Marquis in L.A., with armed security guards walking around on the roof. It was a little weird, to say the least."

Gramm rejoined Foreigner and brought along his Shadow King bandmate, bassist Bruce Turgon, to replace Wills, who had left after the band's 1991 tour following a falling out with Jones. Gramm co-produced the band's second greatest hits album, The Very Best ... and Beyond (September 1992), which included three new songs.

In October 1994 Foreigner released what was intended to be a comeback album, Mr. Moonlight, in Japan. Featuring new drummer Mark Schulman and new keyboardist Jeff Jacobs, this album was not released in the U.S. until February 1995 and fared even worse than Unusual Heat. It peaked at only No. 136 on the Billboard 200, although the ballad "Until the End of Time" became a minor hit, reaching No. 42 on the Billboard Hot 100.

In January 1995 Ron Wikso (who had played in the Storm with former Journey members Gregg Rolie and Ross Valory) took over drumming duties from Schulman, and Brian Tichy succeeded Wikso in 1998 before Schulman returned in 2000.

In April 1997 Gramm underwent surgery to remove a brain tumor. The medications he was prescribed caused significant weight gain and weakened his singing voice.

By 1998, the band was back on the road, but Gramm was visibly struggling, and it took him several years to regain the confidence to perform comfortably on stage.

In the summer of 1999, Foreigner toured as the opening act for Journey, and the following summer, during the band's 2000 summer tour, Jeff Jacobs had to leave for a short time while his wife was giving birth to their child. Keyboardist John Purdell (who had co-produced the new tracks on their 1992 album The Very Best of ... and Beyond) stepped in to substitute for Jacobs until he could return.

In 2001 the Warner Music Group selected Foreigner and 4 to be among the first albums from their catalog to be remastered, enhanced, and released in the new DVD Audio format.

The 25th Anniversary Year in 2002 brought confirmation of the enduring respect for Foreigner's recordings, with Rhino Entertainment reissuing the multi-platinum albums from 1977 to 1981 in special enhanced formats. Foreigner, Double Vision, Head Games, and 4 were given attention by Rhino's staff, featuring new photos, liner notes, and bonus tracks of previously unreleased material. New greatest hits albums were also produced in the U.S. and Europe. The U.S. version reached No. 80 on the Billboard 200 Album chart.

For the group's 25th Anniversary Tour in 2002, they were joined by former Heart and Montrose drummer Denny Carmassi.

In late October/early November and then December 2002, Foreigner performed in Belgium and Germany at the annual Night of the Proms festival. This marked the last time Gramm and Jones would perform together for many years, as Gramm would leave the group again in early 2003. Jones noted that he and Gramm parted ways because of a lack of communication: "I think we really tried hard to save it, but it got to the point when we both realized that to go on would be detrimental for both of us." However, he did not rule out working with Gramm again in the future.

=== 2005–2012 ===
Jones, the founder and only remaining original member of Foreigner, decided to take some time off before seeking to form a new lineup in 2004. On July 25, 2004, in Santa Barbara, California, at Fess Parker's DoubleTree Resort, Jones performed at a benefit show for muscular dystrophy called "Mick Jones & Friends", which featured: Jeff Jacobs, Thom Gimbel, former Dokken bassist Jeff Pilson, future Black Country Communion drummer Jason Bonham (son of Led Zeppelin drummer John Bonham and leader of Bonham), and Bonham singer Chas West. West was the frontman for that show only. Inspired by the event and encouraged by Jason Bonham, Jones continued searching for a new frontman. He eventually found former Hurricane singer Kelly Hansen, who had sent the band an audition tape and was invited to join in March 2005. Hansen made his debut with the group on March 11 at Boulder Station near Las Vegas.

During their 2005 spring tour, Chas West briefly appeared with the band as a special guest, playing rhythm guitar.

Their 2005 BMG album, Extended Versions, featured the new lineup performing all their classic hits live in concert, noted for being one of the most "studio-like, clean sounding" live album recordings produced.

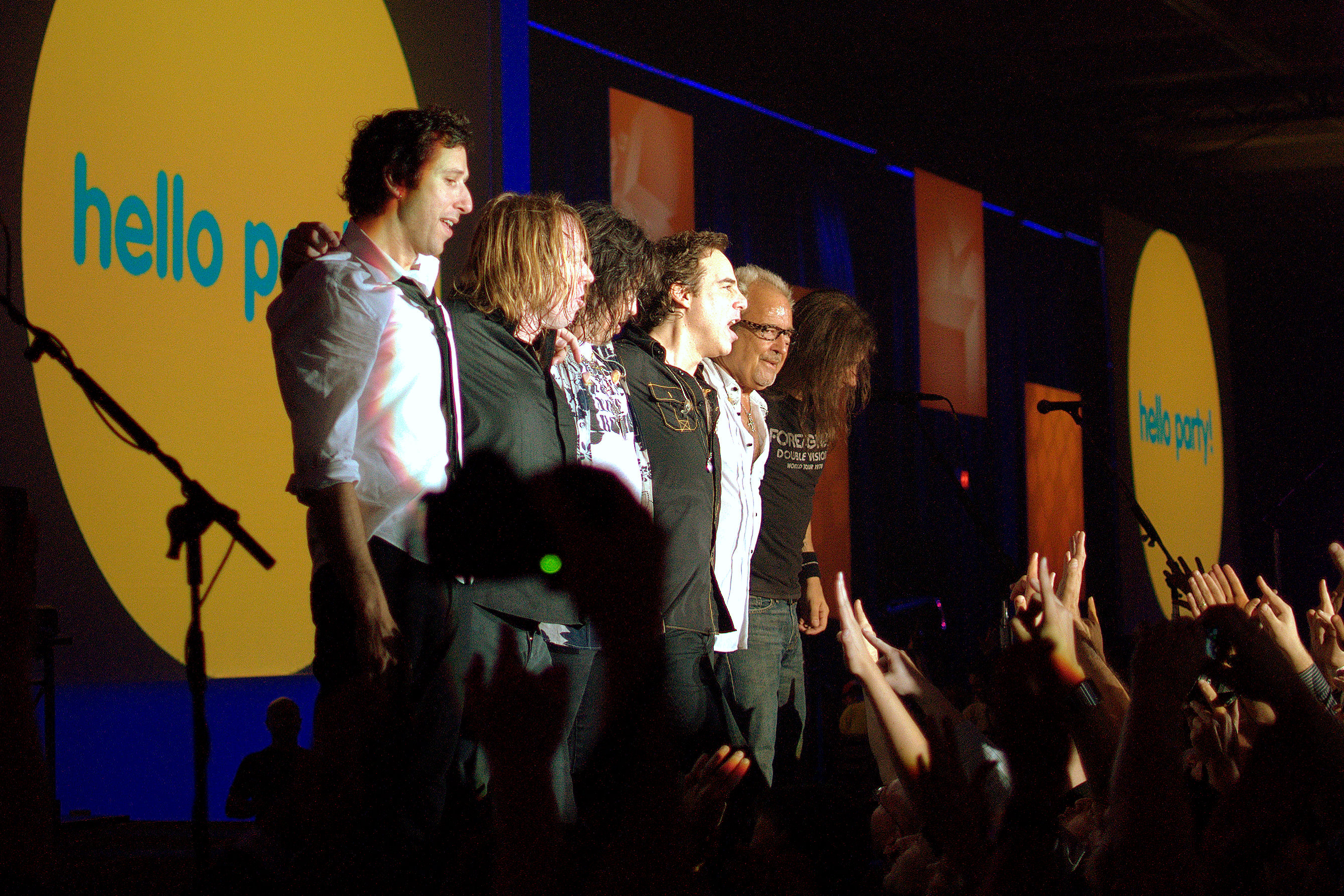
Foreigner in San Francisco in September 2009

Foreigner toured with Def Leppard and Styx in 2007. They also toured extensively on their own in 2007 to celebrate the 30th anniversary of their debut album's release.

In September 2007 it was announced that Foreigner would join Pete Townshend, Bill Wyman and the Rhythm Kings, and Paolo Nutini as openers for the one-night-only Led Zeppelin reunion show in honor of Atlantic Records' Ahmet Ertegun. The show took place on December 10, 2007, in London, England, having been postponed by two weeks due to Jimmy Page fracturing a finger.

In late 2007, keyboardist Jeff Jacobs left Foreigner after 16 years and was replaced first by Paul Mirkovich and then by Michael Bluestein in 2008. Bonham also parted ways with Foreigner in 2008, and Bryan Head was brought in to replace him. However, Head's tenure was short, and he was soon replaced by the returning Tichy.

The band released a greatest hits anthology on July 15, 2008, titled No End in Sight: The Very Best of Foreigner. The anthology included all of their greatest hits, along with new live recordings and a new studio track, "Too Late", which marked their first new song release since the 1994 album Mr. Moonlight and the first recorded output of the new lineup. "Too Late" was released as a single on June 17, 2008.

Foreigner released a new album on September 29, 2009, titled Can't Slow Down. It was one of several recent classic rock releases (AC/DC, the Eagles, Journey, and Kiss being four others) that were released exclusively through the Walmart store chain in the U.S., while in Europe, the album was released by earMUSIC (a label part of the Edel group), charting in the top 20 in Germany (No. 16) and the top 30 in Switzerland. Can't Slow Down debuted at No. 29 on the Billboard 200. The first two singles from the album, "When It Comes to Love" and "In Pieces", both reached the top 20 on Billboard's Adult Contemporary chart. In 2010, the album was awarded a gold certification from the Independent Music Companies Association, indicating sales of at least 100,000 copies throughout Europe.

In early 2010, Foreigner teamed up with Styx and Kansas for the United in Rock Tour. On May 4, 2010, it was announced that Jason Sutter would replace Brian Tichy as drummer. Sutter's time with the band was brief, as he left by 2011. Mark Schulman then returned to Foreigner for his third stint as drummer. On February 20, 2011, the band performed for the first time in Bangalore, India, along with sitar player Niladri Kumar. In June 2011, Foreigner (again with Styx) co-headlined with Journey on their UK tour. Following this, they joined Journey and Night Ranger for a triple bill summer/fall tour of the US. For some dates on this tour, Brian Tichy substituted for Foreigner's drummer Mark Schulman when Schulman was unavailable.

From August 19 to September 10, 2011, Night Ranger guitarist Joel Hoekstra played double duty, performing for NR while also substituting for Jones, who had fallen ill. Shortly thereafter, guitarist Bruce Watson (formerly of Rod Stewart) was brought in as Jones' replacement for the remaining tour dates and continued to tour with the group when they resumed touring in February 2012 after Jones underwent aortoiliac bypass surgery in Miami.

On October 4, 2011, Foreigner released Acoustique, which featured their most popular and well-known songs along with some newer tracks, recorded in a stripped-down, acoustic format.

In May 2012, after being diagnosed with colorectal cancer, Bluestein was forced to take a leave of absence from the band. Ollie Marland stepped in as his replacement on keyboards. Bluestein returned to the band in August 2012, and Tichy rejoined in the interim until his commitments with Whitesnake required his departure. In September 2012, Chris Frazier, whom Tichy had replaced in Whitesnake, became Foreigner's new percussionist.

On August 31, 2012, after over a year away, Jones returned to the concert stage at Atlanta's Chastain Park. Guitarist Watson, meanwhile, remained in the group, which proved helpful due to Jones' frequent health-related absences, which continued. At this same show, keyboardist Derek Hilland (formerly of Iron Butterfly, Whitesnake, and Rick Springfield) joined the band to substitute for Bluestein for the group's late summer/fall tour dates and again during the winter/spring of 2013 until Bluestein was able to return.

=== 2013–2016 ===
On January 9, 2013, the band's original drummer, Dennis Elliott, joined Foreigner on stage at the Hard Rock Cafe in Hollywood, Florida, to perform "Hot Blooded".

In addition to touring small clubs and venues, the band is frequently hired for private parties and conventions, including performances at SeaWorld in Orlando for an IBM Rational Conference (June 6, 2012), at the Gaylord convention center in Washington, D.C., for the Teradata Partners 2012 conference (October 25, 2012), and at SAP's Field Kickoff Meeting in Las Vegas (January 23, 2013).

On June 13, 2013, at the 44th Annual Songwriters Hall of Fame Award Ceremony, Jones and Gramm were officially inducted into the Songwriters Hall of Fame. Billy Joel was present to induct Jones and Gramm, singing snippets of Foreigner's hits during his introduction speech. Jones expressed pride in the honor, stating that it made his work "legit". The duo then took the stage one more time and, along with Thom Gimbel and the house band, performed "Juke Box Hero" and "I Want to Know What Love Is" with Anthony Morgan's Inspirational Choir of Harlem — a performance that brought the entire audience to its feet.

Original bassist Ed Gagliardi died on May 11, 2014, aged 62, after an eight-year battle with cancer. Although discussions about a reunion of the original members had been proposed, the original band had not performed together since 1979.

In 2014 Foreigner teamed up with Styx and former Eagles guitarist Don Felder for the Soundtrack of Summer Tour. On June 18, 2014, Foreigner collaborated with the Brockton High School concert choir at the Leader Bank Pavilion in Boston, where they performed one of their greatest hits, "I Want to Know What Love Is".

On January 12, 2015, in Sarasota, Florida, Foreigner were joined on stage by original drummer Dennis Elliott and former bassist Rick Wills to perform "Hot Blooded".

In Hartford, Connecticut on June 24, 2015, Foreigner began a summer tour as the opening act for Kid Rock.

Foreigner appeared on the Today Show on February 11, 2016, along with the choir from Our Lady of Mercy Academy to promote their Acoustic Tour and the release of their new album, In Concert: Unplugged. On September 24, 2016, Foreigner performed before an estimated 20,000 people at the 100th anniversary of the Durham Fair in Durham, Connecticut. The encore song, "I Want to Know What Love Is", featured the local Coginchaug Regional High School concert choir after several months of rehearsals with the band over Skype in the months leading up to the concert.

=== Reappearance of Gramm and other original members (2016–2022) ===
In a 2016 interview, Jones discussed the possibility of a 40th anniversary reunion tour featuring the Head Games-era lineup: "It's quite possible. We've actually been talking about it. I'm not at a point where I can say it's definitely gonna happen, but we're all working on trying to make it happen. It's kind of exciting. And hopefully, it'll be feasible and possible to pull it off next year (2017). Lou (Gramm) and I have communicated and we've kept up a sort of loose communication as I have actually also with Ian McDonald, Al Greenwood, Dennis Elliott, and Rick Wills. We're at the early stages, but we're trying to put something together to commemorate (it's scary when I say it) 40 years."

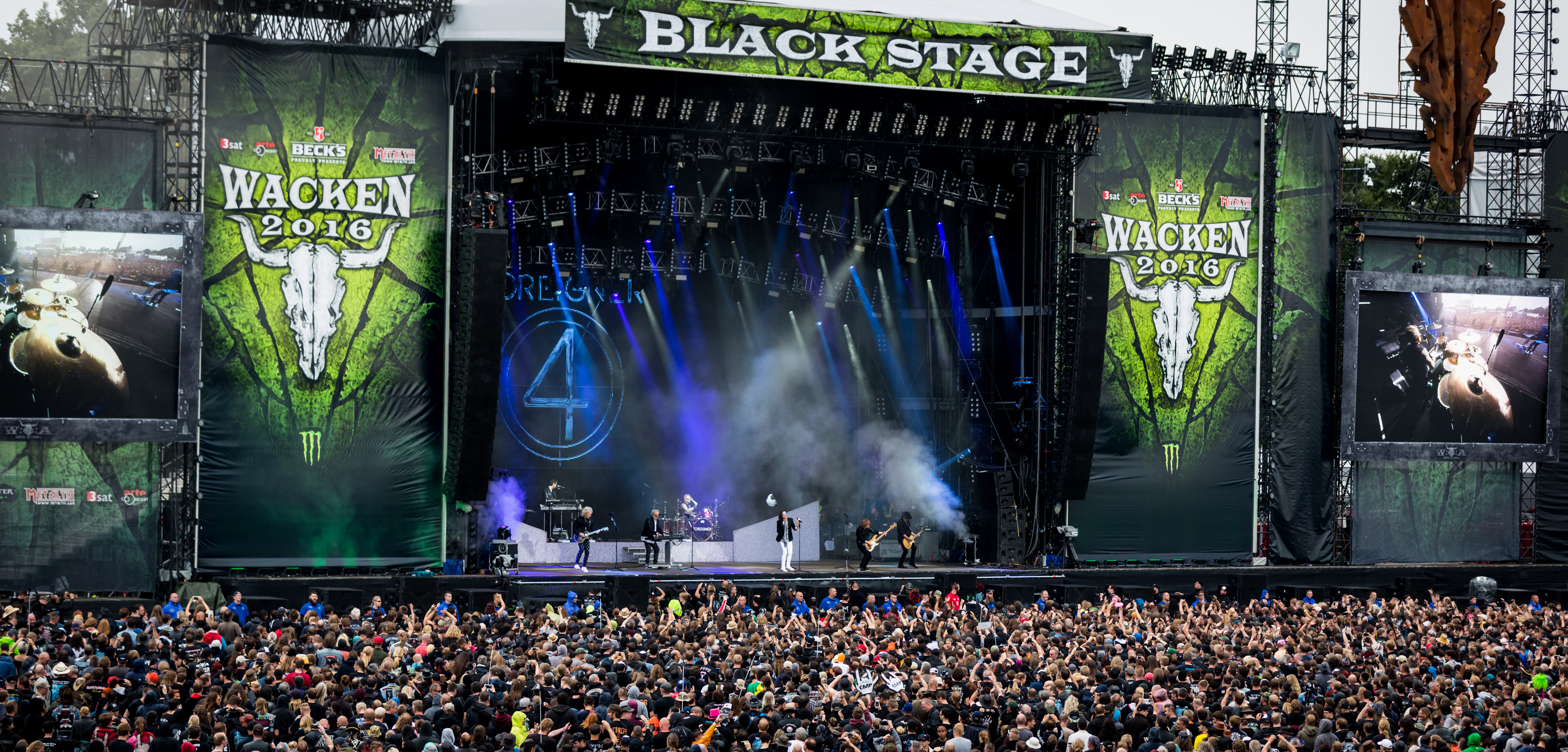
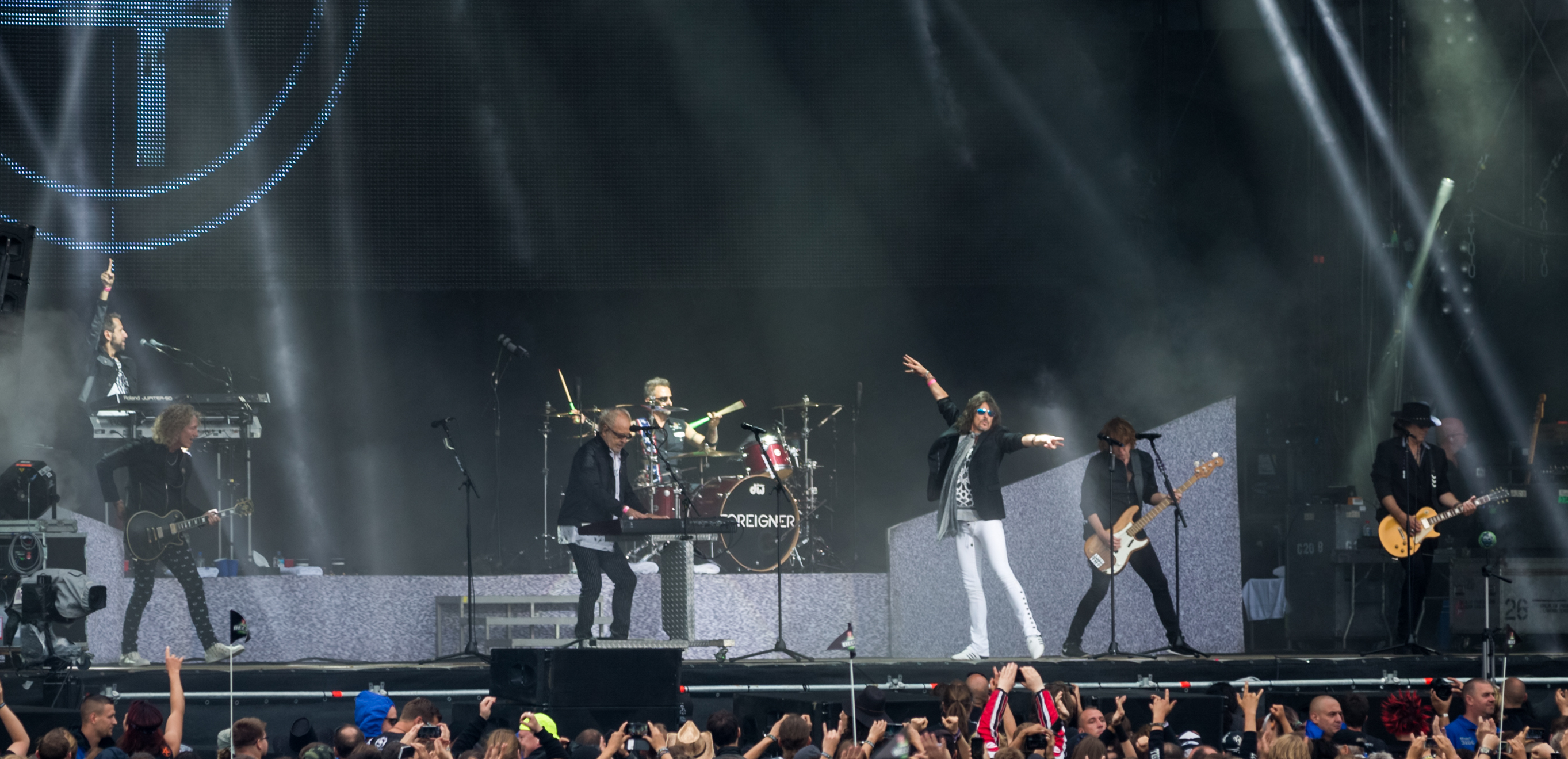
Foreigner at Wacken Open Air in August 2016

On November 25, 2016, in celebration of their 40th anniversary, Foreigner released a limited-edition 10-inch vinyl EP, The Flame Still Burns, on Rhino Records for Record Store Day's Black Friday event. The EP's track listing included the title song (which had previously appeared on Foreigner's Acoustique album and had earlier been featured in the 1998 film Still Crazy) as well as live "unplugged" versions of "Feels Like the First Time", "Long, Long Way from Home" and "Juke Box Hero".

On July 20, 2017, at Jones Beach Theater on Long Island, the current Foreigner lineup was joined for their encore by Lou Gramm, Ian McDonald, and Al Greenwood to help celebrate the band's 40th anniversary. Greenwood and McDonald returned the following year to perform with the group at their Jones Beach show on June 22, 2018. Dennis Elliott likewise joined his former bandmates for two songs at Foreigner's show on August 2, 2017, at MidFlorida Credit Union Amphitheatre in Tampa. Another reunion was announced for a pair of shows on October 6–7, 2017, at the Soaring Eagle Casino in Mount Pleasant, Michigan, where the group was again joined by Lou Gramm, Dennis Elliott, Al Greenwood, Ian McDonald, and Rick Wills. The concerts were filmed for future release to celebrate the 40th anniversary of the album Double Vision. Foreigner - Double Vision: Then and Now was later released (on November 15, 2019) as a concert film/documentary (in various options, including bundles of the concert film/documentary with either a CD or limited edition double LP live album).

In a July 2018 interview with OC Weekly, bassist Jeff Pilson stated that Foreigner had no plans to release a new studio album but would continue to release singles periodically.

On November 9, 2018, all surviving original members of Foreigner joined the current lineup on stage for a show at Microsoft Theater in Los Angeles, marking the beginning of the "Foreigner Then and Now" concert series, which ran through the end of the year.

In October 2019 the group was set to be joined once again by the surviving original members for a series of shows as part of the Double Vision: Then and Now tour. However, on October 2, it was announced that Lou Gramm would not be participating in these dates due to illness.

Also in 2019, a jukebox musical titled Jukebox Hero, named after Foreigner's hit single and featuring the band's catalog, debuted. While being interviewed by Rolling Stone about the musical, Gramm mentioned that he and Jones were considering revisiting several songs that the two had written before Gramm's second departure in 2003.

Foreigner announced a 2020 summer tour with support from Kansas and Europe called "Juke Box Heroes", named after the song of the same name. On May 19, 2020, Foreigner announced that the band's Juke Box Heroes 2020 Tour was canceled due to the COVID-19 pandemic.

On March 18, 2021, Pilson announced that Thom Gimbel would be departing from the band. Gimbel was replaced by rhythm guitarist Luis Maldonado. Pilson later confirmed on March 20, 2021, that Foreigner was working on new music: "[But] we are working on some music. So I think that what's gonna happen is whatever other things we release in the next couple of years, there will be some new songs added to it. So that's what I see kind of happening. 'Cause we're working on a few that are not that far away. So I would say expect a package deal to have a couple of new songs on it."

Jones was absent from the band's 2021 tour, leaving no members from the original or classic lineup. As a result, none of the band's lineup for the tour played on the original versions of any songs.

Founding member Ian McDonald died from colon cancer at his home in New York City on February 9, 2022, at the age of 75.

In 2022 the band was announced to be opening for Kid Rock on select dates for his Bad Reputation Tour.

In August 2022 in an interview with John Beaudin of the YouTube music news channel "Rock Music History", original lead singer Lou Gramm stated that he would not likely participate in any potential future reunion concerts with other members from the band's original and classic lineups. Gramm was dismayed for multiple reasons, including the deaths of two original members: bassist Ed Gagliardi (who died in 2014, before the various reunion concerts) and rhythm guitarist/multi-instrumentalist Ian McDonald (who died in 2022 after having participated in reunion concerts prior to the coronavirus pandemic). Gramm also cited Jones' reduced participation, and often lack of participation, in the band's recent concerts as a result of Jones' continued health issues; Gramm reported that Jones:

is in very poor health...[w]hen the new Foreigner plays, I've heard that [Mick Jones] comes on for one song and then waves and goes off stage. [Until fairly recently,] he would play the whole last half of the set. But then he was in the hospital again for weeks. He had some heart problems[,] and his recovery time was very long and tedious. And I heard that he comes out for one song now...when he comes on.

As stated previously, when Jones' performance is reduced, or when he is absent from concerts, what Gramm refers to as "the new Foreigner" is often left without any original members performing. Gramm also revealed his opinion of current lead singer Kelly Hansen, stating that Hansen was "all right" and "a good singer"; however, Gramm believes that Jones has limited Hansen's abilities by having Hansen "study" and "[mimic]" Gramm's vocal performances. Gramm said that he does not "take it as a compliment. You're a singer with a big band like that - use your voice and your style. Don't hang your coat on my hook" (italics found in original text).

=== Farewell tour and Rock and Roll Hall of Fame induction (2022–present) ===
On November 14, 2022, the band announced that they would be embarking on their farewell tour (referred to in different sources as "The Historic Farewell Tour" and the "Feels Like the Last Time Farewell Tour"), which began in 2023 and was scheduled to conclude in 2024.

In December 2023 and January 2024 it was announced that Foreigner and Styx would reunite for the co-headlining "Renegades & Juke Box Heroes Tour" (with opening act and "special guest" John Waite), which was described by Tim Chan of Rolling Stone as "a string of summer [2024] dates across North America." It is unclear whether this is considered a temporary interruption of the farewell tour (as it features a new tour name) or a continuation of the farewell tour (as described by lead singer Hansen and Rolling Stone). Foreigner also announced the release of a Dolby Atmos mix of their compilation album Records to promote the tour.

In 2024 Foreigner was selected for induction into the Rock and Roll Hall of Fame. The inducted members are founding members Mick Jones, Lou Gramm, Dennis Elliott, Al Greenwood, the late Ian McDonald, and the late Ed Gagliardi, as well as Gagliardi's replacement, longtime bassist Rick Wills.

In February 2024 Foreigner's Mick Jones revealed that he had been battling Parkinson's disease, which had impacted his ability to participate fully in performances. This included either skipping shows or limiting the number of songs he played at concerts, depending on the specific event or tour.

In March Kelly Hansen (lead singer) and Jeff Pilson (bassist) expressed that there might be potential for the band to release new material. They noted having unfinished songs from previous years and shared that Jones had been collaborating with Can't Stop Now co-producer Marti Frederiksen on new writing projects. Additionally, manager Phil Carson suggested that Foreigner's farewell tour could extend into 2025 and potentially 2026, which would align with the band's 50th anniversary.

Former lead vocalist Lou Gramm also shared that he had inadvertently given Jones the only copy of "eight or nine" unreleased songs that the two had worked on prior to his departure from the band in 2003. Gramm revealed that Jones and manager Phil Carson were resistant to making a new copy for him. Despite prior comments in August 2022, Gramm confirmed his intention to join the band for a brief two-song set at their Rock and Roll Hall of Fame induction in 2024, which would include "I Want to Know What Love Is" and another song. Gramm also expressed that he planned to retire from performing at the end of 2024 and was interested in recording an album featuring the unreleased material with Jones and Foreigner.

Gramm also claimed that he had no memory of performing with Jones or other classic-era Foreigner members in 2017 and 2018, nor of an interview they did together in 2019. He stated that he had not spoken to or performed with Jones since 2013, when they were inducted into the Songwriters' Hall of Fame.

In August 2024, Foreigner released a previously unreleased single titled "Turning Back the Time", which was originally written and demoed in 1996 by Jones, Gramm, and Frederiksen. Following the announcement of the band's Rock and Roll Hall of Fame induction, Jones and Frederiksen decided to revisit the track. The song features Gramm's original lead vocals, Jones on guitar and keyboards, Frederiksen on guitar and bass, and Frederiksen's son Evan on drums. No other members of Foreigner contributed to the song. In addition to being released as a single, "Turning Back the Time" is the title track of a compilation album released at the end of 2024.

In March 2025, it was announced that Gramm would once again reunite with the band as a special guest singer, while Maldonado handled most the lead vocals for the Latin American leg of their farewell tour in April/May. Hansen then announced on May 20, 2025, that he would be leaving Foreigner after the band's summer tour, to be fully replaced by Maldonado. The band also released Spanish-language versions of "Urgent" and "I Want to Know What Love Is" (titled "Quiero Saber Si es Amor"), the latter featuring Joy Huerta.

For the band's October–November 2025 dates in Canada, Maldonado officially began his role as lead vocalist. During this tour, as part of promoting a musical, Geordie Brown a Canadian actor, known for originating the lead role in Jukebox Hero: The Musical, featuring the greatest hits of Foreigner, made a special appearance with the band. His career spans theatre, film, television, and music.

In late 2025, guitarist John Roth, best known for his work with the rock bands Black Oak Arkansas, Winger, Giant, Starship and more, announced that he would be joining Foreigner. The band will tour in 2026. No support acts were announced.

== Musical style and impact ==
Foreigner are considered to be a hard rock and album-oriented rock band. Later releases incorporated elements of new wave and adult contemporary. Hence, the band's recorded catalog contains both rock anthems and sentimental ballads. The band members self-describe some of their songs as breakup songs, and also claim to have experimented with elements of psychedelic music and raggeaton on certain tracks. The band's music is known for its hooks, with AllMusic describing their first two albums as "a double shot of exceedingly catchy songs and slick production." Foreigner's influence has been observed in the works of American alternative rock band Soul Asylum and English-Irish boy band One Direction.

The band's vocals are sung in the high tenor range.

== Band members ==
=== Current ===
- Mick Jones – guitar, keyboards, backing and lead vocals (1976–present; not touring 2011–2012, 2021–2022, 2023–present)
- Jeff Pilson – bass, backing vocals, keyboards (2004–present)
- Michael Bluestein – keyboards, keytar, synthesizers, backing vocals (2008–present)
- Bruce Watson – guitar, backing vocals (2011–present)
- Chris Frazier – drums, percussion (2012–present)
- Luis Maldonado – lead vocals (2025–present); guitar, bass, backing vocals (2021–2025)
- John Roth – guitar, bass, backing vocals (2025–present)

== Discography ==
=== Studio albums ===
- Foreigner (1977)
- Double Vision (1978)
- Head Games (1979)
- 4 (1981)
- Agent Provocateur (1984)
- Inside Information (1987)
- Unusual Heat (1991)
- Mr. Moonlight (1994)
- Can't Slow Down (2009)

== See also ==
- List of artists who reached number one in the United States
- List of artists who reached number one on the U.S. Mainstream Rock chart
- List of best-selling music artists
- Lists of Billboard 200 number-one albums
- Lists of Billboard number-one singles
