= Ed Gagliardi =

- Born: Edward John Gagliardi; February 13, 1952; Brooklyn, New York, U.S.
- Died: May 11, 2014 (aged 62) Atlanta, Georgia, U.S.
- Genres: Rock
- Occupations: Musician
- Instruments: Bass guitar
- Years active: 1966–2014
- Spouse: Loretta Gagliardi

Edward John Gagliardi (February 13, 1952 – May 11, 2014) was an American bass guitarist, best known as the original bass player for the 1970s rock band Foreigner. He was a member of Foreigner from the beginning in 1976. Gagliardi notably played a Fireglo (sunburst) Rickenbacker bass guitar, left-handed despite being naturally right-handed. It is widely known that he played left-handed out of admiration, and devotion to Paul McCartney (most often self-doctored from right-handed basses, reengineered and played upside down, by Gagliardi himself). Gagliardi was on the albums Foreigner and Double Vision.

In 1981, Gagliardi formed the band Spys with former Foreigner keyboardist Al Greenwood, a band that set the tone for much of the 80's synth-rock bands, and received acclaim within the musical community.

Gagliardi died of cancer on May 11, 2014, after battling the disease for eight years. Friends and family held a private ceremony.

In 2024, Gagliardi was posthumously inducted into the Rock and Roll Hall of Fame, as a member of Foreigner.
