= Al Greenwood =

American musician (born 1951)

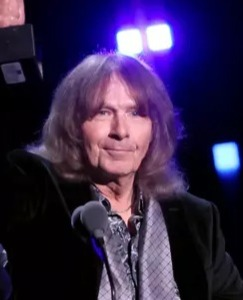
- RRHOF Induction 2024

Background information
- Born: October 20, 1951 (age 75); New York City, U.S.
- Instrument: Keyboards

Alan Greenwood (born October 20, 1951) is an American rock musician who was a founding member and keyboardist of the rock band Foreigner from 1976 to 1980. He performed on the albums Foreigner (1977), Double Vision (1978) and Head Games (1979). In 2024, Greenwood was inducted into the Rock and Roll Hall of Fame, as a member of Foreigner.

In 1981, Greenwood formed the band Spys with former Foreigner bass player Ed Gagliardi, John Blanco, John Digaudio and Billy Milne and recorded the albums Spys (1982) and Behind Enemy Lines (1983).

Greenwood played keyboards on former Rainbow (and future Yngwie Malmsteen's Rising Force and Deep Purple) frontman Joe Lynn Turner's 1985 debut solo album, Rescue You.

Greenwood produced and played keyboards on many Arti Tisi recordings (with Alice Cooper, Megadeth) and Trans-Siberian Orchestra) guitarist Al Pitrelli.

== Discography ==
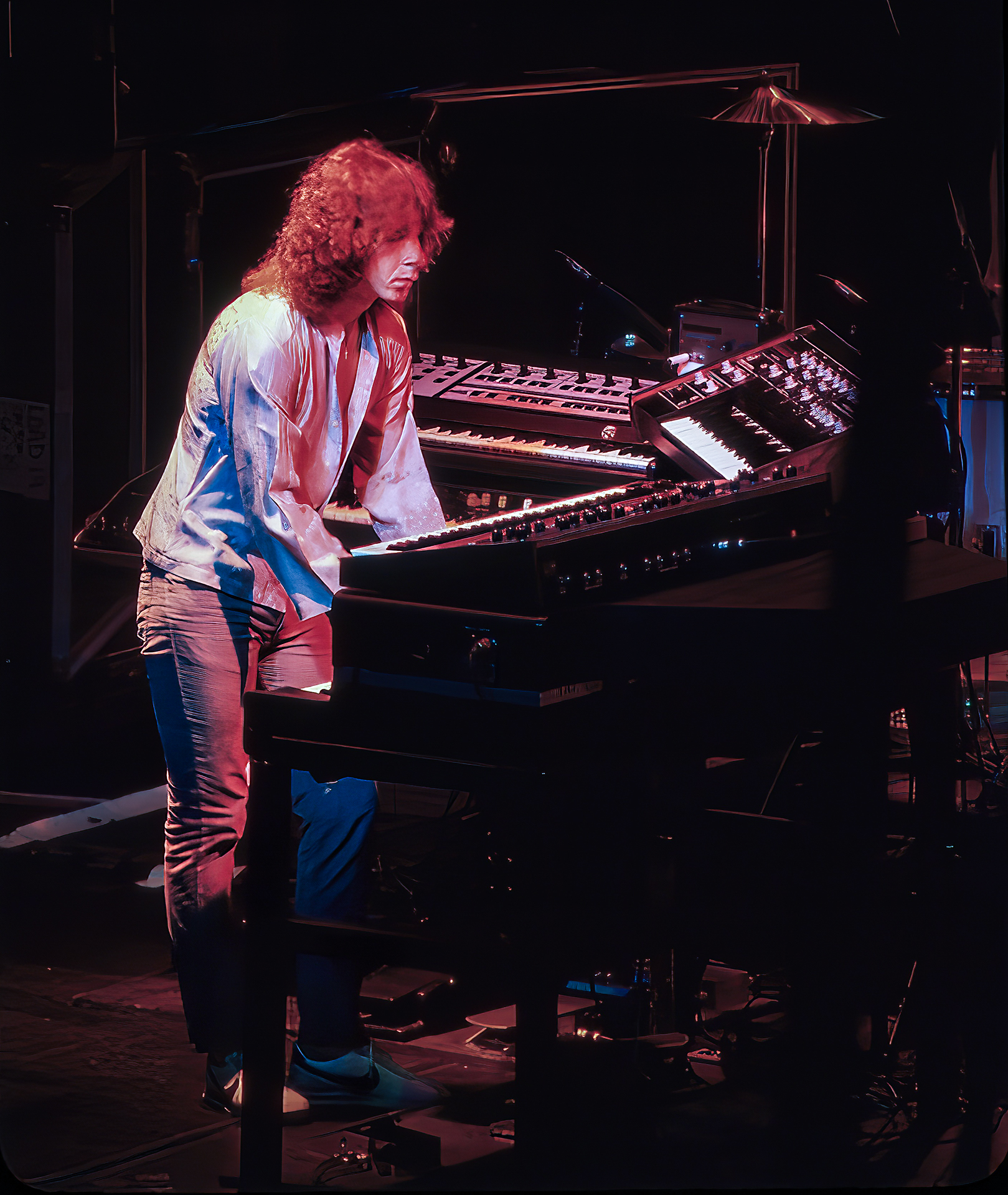
Al Greenwood performs with Foreigner on November 25, 1979

=== Foreigner ===
- 1977: Foreigner (#4 US)
- 1978: Double Vision (#3 US, #32 UK)
- 1979: Head Games (#5 US)
- 1982: Records (#10 US, #58 UK)
- 1992: The Very Best ... and Beyond (#123 US, #19 UK)
- 1993: Classic Hits Live/Best Of Live
- 1994: JukeBox Heroes: The Best Of
- 1998: The Best of Ballads – I Want to Know What Love Is
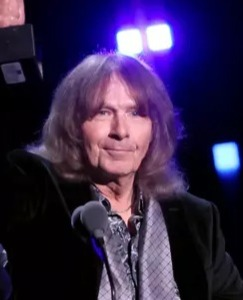
- Rock and Roll Hall of Fame Induction
  1999: The Platinum Collection
- 2000: Hot Blooded And Other Hits
- 2000: Jukebox Heroes: The Foreigner Anthology
- 2002: Complete Greatest Hits (#80 US)
- 2002: The Definitive (#33 UK)
- 2004: Hot Blooded And Other Hits
- 2005: The Essentials
- 2008: No End in Sight: The Very Best of Foreigner (#132 US)
- 2009: Can't Slow Down (#29 US)
- 2014: The Complete Atlantic Studio Albums 1977–1991

=== Ian Lloyd ===
- 1980: Third Wave Civilization

=== Spys ===
- 1982: Spys
- 1983: Behind Enemy Lines
- 1996: Spys / Behind Enemy Lines

=== Joe Lynn Turner ===
- 1985: Rescue You (#146 US)
- 1998: Hurry Up and Wait
- 1999: Waiting For A Girl Like You (EP)
- 2016: Street of Dreams – Boston 1985

=== Jennifer Rush ===
- 1987: Heart Over Mind (#118 US, #48 UK)

=== Garbo Talks ===
- 1998: Garbo Talks

== Equipment ==
As per an interview conducted by Dominic Milano from Contemporary Keyboard (Keyboard since 1980), and appeared in the April 1979 issue, Greenwood stated, "When I first got into Foreigner I had a Hammond L-100 and an EML 101 synthesizer, and I think I had an Orchestron, but that's all been changed. Now I use a cutdown Hammond B-3, an ARP Omni, and a Wurlitzer electric piano. I still use the same EML 101, which I've had for about six years, and I just got an Oberheim OB-1, which is a really nice little programmable synthesizer."
