= Mick Jones (Foreigner guitarist) =

English rock guitarist (born 1944)

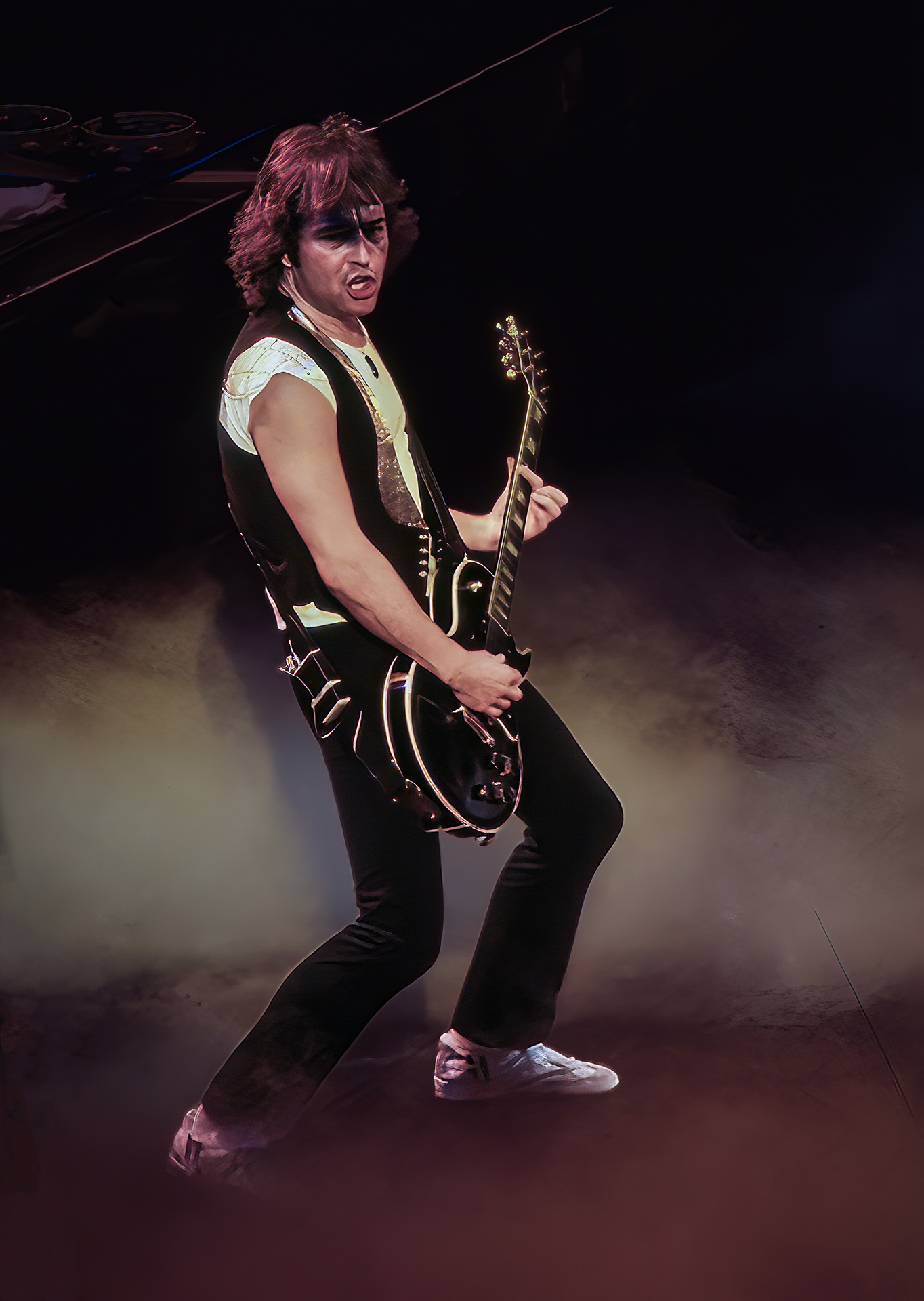
- Jones performing with Foreigner in 1979

Background information
- Born: Michael Leslie Jones; 27 December 1944 (age 81); Portsmouth, Hampshire, England
- Origin: Andover, Hampshire, England
- Genres: Rock; hard rock
- Occupations: Musician; songwriter; singer; producer
- Instruments: Guitar; keyboards; vocals
- Years active: 1961–present
- Labels: Atlantic; Warner

Michael Leslie Jones (born 27 December 1944) is an English musician, songwriter and record producer, best known as the founder, leader and only continuous original member of the British-American rock band Foreigner, though he no longer tours with the band as of 2023. Prior to Foreigner, he was in the band Spooky Tooth.

== Early life ==
Michael Leslie Jones was born on 27 December 1944 in Portsmouth, England. Jones started playing guitar at an early age, and decided to pursue a career in music.

== Career ==
He began his professional music career in the early 1960s as a member of the band Nero and the Gladiators, who scored two minor British hit singles in 1961. After the demise of Nero and the Gladiators, Jones worked as a songwriter and session musician in France for such artists as Françoise Hardy, Sylvie Vartan, and Johnny Hallyday, for whom he wrote many songs, including "Je suis né dans la rue" and "À tout casser" (which features Jimmy Page on guitar). When The Beatles toured France in 1964, they befriended Jones when Hallyday's girlfriend and future wife, Sylvie Vartan, played on the same bill as they did. Between 1965 and 1971, Jones recorded in France with Tommy Brown (Thomas R. Browne) as State of Mickey & Tommy, as well as under other session names, including the Blackburds, Nimrod, and the J&B.

After leaving France to return to his home country, Jones joined Gary Wright, formerly of the band Spooky Tooth, to form Wonderwheel in 1971. In 1972, Jones and Wright reformed Spooky Tooth and, after that, Jones was a member of the Leslie West Band. He also played guitar on the albums Wind of Change (1972) for Peter Frampton, and Dark Horse (1974) for George Harrison.

In 1976, Jones formed Foreigner with Ian McDonald, and recruited lead singer Lou Gramm. Jones co-produced all of the band's albums and co-wrote most of their songs with Gramm. Jones is credited with writing the band's most successful single, "I Want to Know What Love Is", by himself. Tensions developed within the band during the late 1980s, attributed to a difference in musical taste between Gramm, who favoured a more hard-edged rock, as opposed to Jones' interest in synthesisers. Gramm left the band in 1990 but returned in 1992. In 1989 Jones released his only solo album, titled Mick Jones, on the Atlantic Records label. Jones is the only member to play on every Foreigner album.

In between his Foreigner commitments, Jones also started a side career as a producer for such albums as Van Halen's 5150 (1986), Bad Company's Fame and Fortune (1986) and Billy Joel's Storm Front (1989).

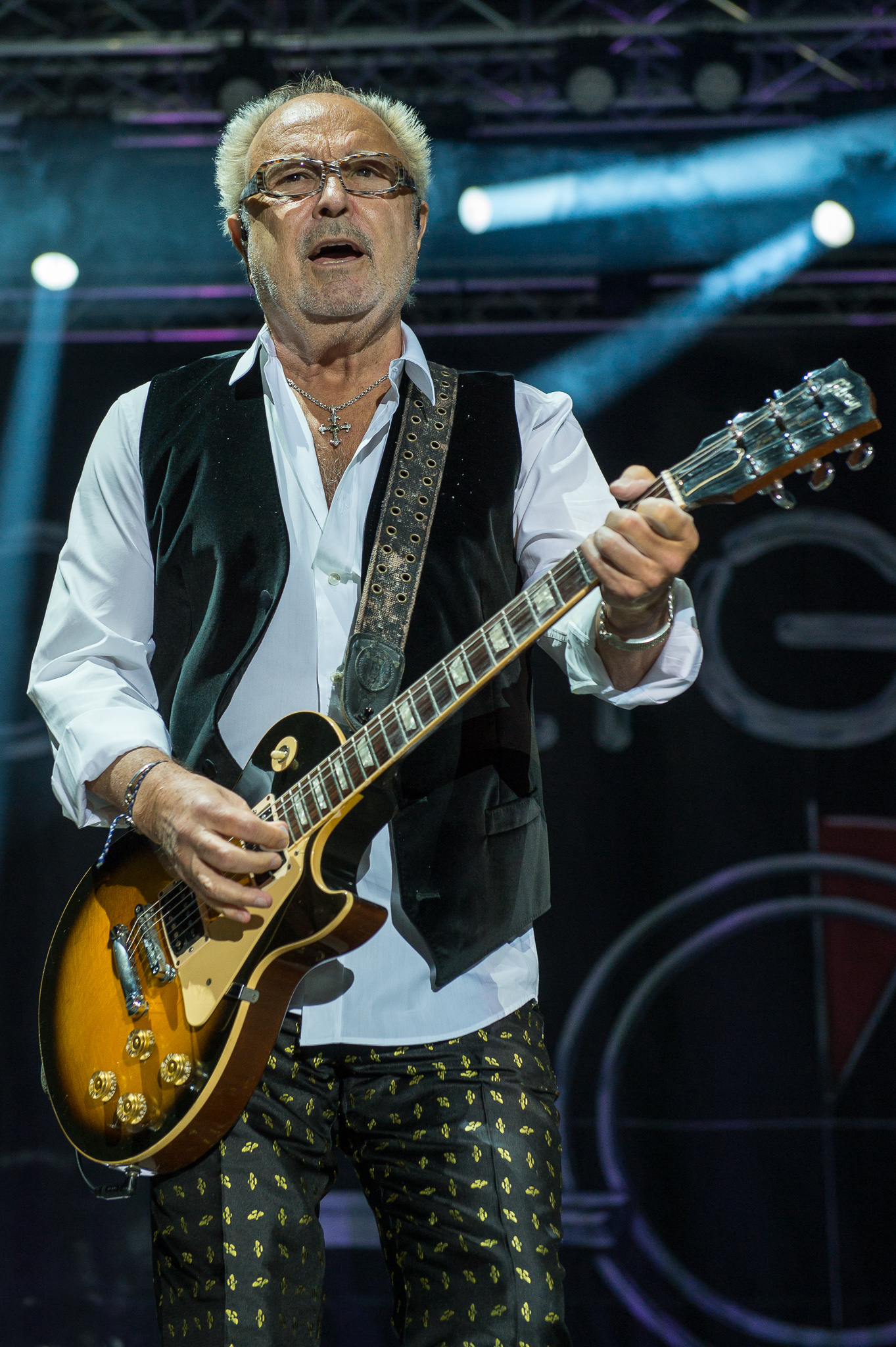
Jones with Foreigner in 2016

He co-wrote with Eric Clapton the song "Bad Love" on Clapton's Journeyman album, and in 2002 co-wrote the song "On Her Mind" with Duncan Sheik. In the late 1990s and early 2000s, he played with Bill Wyman's Rhythm Kings. In 2024, Jones was inducted into the Rock and Roll Hall of Fame, as a member of Foreigner.

== Personal life ==
Jones is married to socialite/writer/jewellery designer Ann Dexter-Jones, mother of Mark, Samantha and Charlotte Ronson. He and Dexter-Jones have two children, Annabelle Dexter-Jones and Alexander Dexter-Jones. Married for nearly 25 years (1983–2007), they divorced in 2007. In March 2017, the couple remarried. Jones also has two sons, Roman Jones and Christopher Jones, from previous relationships.

In February 2024, Jones revealed that he had been diagnosed with Parkinson's disease years back, citing this as his reason for not touring with Foreigner since 2023. In April 2026, former bandmate Lou Gramm revealed that Jones was in the "end stages of Alzheimer's".

== Album producer credits ==
In addition to the Foreigner albums, Jones has produced the following:

- 5150 – Van Halen (1986)
- Fame and Fortune – Bad Company (1986)
- Save the Last Dance for Me – Ben E. King (1987)
- Dead, White and Blue – Flesh & Blood (1989)
- Storm Front – Billy Joel (1989)
- In Deep – Tina Arena (1997)

== Discography ==
=== Albums ===
- Mick Jones (1989 (Studio))
- The Concert for London (2002 (Live))

=== Charting singles ===
Title	Release	Peak chart positions	Album
Title	Release	US Main	Album
"Just Wanna Hold"	1989	16	Mick Jones
