= Hide and Seek =

Hide and seek may refer to:

- Hide-and-seek, a children's game

== Film ==
- Hide and Seek (1932 cartoon), a Fleischer Studios Talkartoon animated short
- Hide and Seek (1963 film), a Swedish comedy film
- Hide and Seek (1964 film), a British thriller film
- Hide and Seek (1972 film), a British children's drama
- Hide and Seek (1980 film), an Israeli drama film
- Hide and Seek, a 1984 Canadian television film based on the novel The Adolescence of P-1 by Thomas J. Ryan
- Hide and Seek, a 1996 film directed by Su Friedrich
- Hide and Seek (2000 film) or Cord, a Canadian thriller film
- Hide & Seek, a 2004 short film starring Mem Ferda
- Hide and Seek (2005 film), an American horror film
- Hide & Seek (2005 animated film), or Kakurenbo, a Japanese anime short film
- Hide and Seek (2007 film), a Philippine horror film
- Hide N' Seek (2012 film), an Indian Malayalam-language film
- Hide and Seek (2013 film), a South Korean mystery film
- Hide and Seek (2014 film), a British-American romantic drama film
- Hide and Seek (2018 film), a Swiss romantic comedy-drama film
- Hide and Seek (2021 film), an American horror-thriller film
- Hide N Seek (2024 film), an Indian Telugu-language crime thriller film
- Hide and Seek (2024 film), an Indian Kannada-language crime thriller film

== Literature ==
- Hide and Seek (Collins novel), an 1854 novel by Wilkie Collins
- Hide & Seek (Patterson novel), a 1997 novel by James Patterson
- Hide and Seek (Rankin novel), a 1991 novel by Ian Rankin
- "Hide-and-Seek" (short story), a 1949 short story by Arthur C. Clarke
- Hide and Seek, a 2005 novel by Clare Sambrook

== Music ==
=== Albums ===
- Hide and Seek (The Birthday Massacre album), 2012
- Hide & Seek (Janet Devlin album) or the title song, 2013
- Hide 'n' Seek (album), by Miho Nakayama, or the title song, 1989
- Hide and Seek (Plastic Tree album) or the title song, 1997
- Hide & Seek (Purple Kiss EP), 2021
- Hide and Seek (Weki Meki EP), 2020

=== Songs ===
- "Hide and Seek" (Howard Jones song), 1984
- "Hide and Seek" (Imogen Heap song), 2005
- "Hide and Seek" (Mirrors song), 2010
- "Hide and Seek" (Namie Amuro song), 2007
- "Hide and Seek" (Tracie Spencer song), 1988
- "Hide & Seek" (TVXQ song), 2014
- "Hide and Seek" / "Sunset Refrain", by Lead, 2020
- "Hide and Seek", by 163Margs and Digga D, 2023
- "Hide-and-Seek", by Band-Maid, B-side of "Glory", 2019
- "Hide and Seek", by Big Joe Turner
- "Hide and Seek", by Bug Hunter from Bigger Than Myself, 2020
- "Hide and Seek", by Dannii Minogue from Unleashed, 2007
- "Hide n Seek", by Doechii from Alligator Bites Never Heal, 2024
- "Hide and Seek", by Hale from Twilight, 2006
- "Hide and Seek", by Joshua Redman from Freedom in the Groove, 1996
- "Hide and Seek", by Loona from [12:00], 2020
- "Hide and Seek", by Simi from Omo Charlie Champagne, Vol. 1, 2019
- "Hide & Seek", by Stormzy from This Is What I Mean, 2022
- "Hide and Seek", by T-ara from Again, 2013
- "Hide and Seek", by Theatre of Tragedy from Forever Is the World, 2009

== Television ==
- Hide and Seek (TV series), a 2018 South Korean series
- Hide and Seek (Eureka), a 2006 8-episode Eureka webseries

=== Episodes ===
- "Hide and Seek" (Adventure Time), 2017
- "Hide and Seek" (Bedlam), 2011
- "Hide and Seek" (Casualty), 1986
- "Hide and Seek" (Happy Tree Friends), 2000
- "Hide and Seek" (Hawkeye), 2021
- "Hide and Seek" (Here and Now), 2018
- "Hide and Seek" (Jay Jay the Jet Plane), 1998
- "Hide and Seek" (Nash Bridges), 1999
- "Hide and Seek" (NCIS), 2009
- "Hide and Seek" (Oobi), c. 2000
- "Hide and Seek" (Peppa Pig), 2004
- "Hide and Seek" (Phineas and Ferb), 2009
- "Hide and Seek" (Pocoyo), 2010
- "Hide and Seek" (The Practice), 1997
- "Hide and Seek" (seaQuest DSV), 1994
- "Hide and Seek" (Severance), 2022
- "Hide and Seek" (Skippy the Bush Kangaroo), 1968/1969
- "Hide and Seek" (Soldier Soldier), 1993
- "Hide and Seek" (Star Trek: Picard), 2022
- "Hide and Seek" (Stargate Atlantis), 2004
- "Hide and Seek" (Teen Titans), 2005
- "Hide and Seek" (Woke Up Dead), 2009

== Other uses ==
- Hide-and-Seek (card game), a variant of the patience game Travellers
- Hide-and-Seek (painting), a 1942 painting by Pavel Tchelitchew

== See also ==
- Hide & Seekers, a 1964 album by the Seekers
- Hiding and Seeking, a 2004 documentary film
- Hyde & Seek, a 2016 Australian television series
- Ready or Not (disambiguation)
- Aankh Micholi (disambiguation)
