= Luanne =

Single by Foreigner

from the album 4
- B-side: "Hot Blooded" (live)
- Released: July 1982 (US)
- Recorded: Early 1981
- Genre: Hard rock; power pop
- Length: 3:25 (album version); 3:11 (single version)
- Label: Atlantic
- Songwriters: Lou Gramm; Mick Jones
- Producers: Robert John "Mutt" Lange; Mick Jones

Foreigner singles chronology
| "Break It Up" (1982) | "Luanne" (1982) | "I Want to Know What Love Is" (1984) |

"Luanne" was the fifth and final single taken from the 1981 album 4 by the band Foreigner, and the second to feature a B-side that was not available on one of their albums, a controversial live version of their hit, "Hot Blooded". The song was written by Lou Gramm and Mick Jones and reached number 75 in the U.S. Billboard Hot 100 chart, but was a live staple for years to come. The live version of "Hot Blooded" was later placed on the international release of their retrospective, Records, but in subsequent re-releases has been dropped in favour of the original album version due to a couple of choice words spoken in ad lib during the song's performance by its singer, Lou Gramm.

Rolling Stone contributor Kurt Loder felt the song sounded like it could have been written by John Fogerty. Berkeley Gazette critic Robert Blades said it has "a mesmerizing pop hook uncommon to most of Foreigner's material" and shows "a breadth of style the band hasn't revealed before." Hartford Courant critic Colin McEnroe called it a "first-class driving rock 'n' roll melody." WCSC-TV music director Chris Bailey praised it, saying that it sounded like songs from REO Speedwagon's Hi Infidelity album. Cash Box said that it's a "pleasant departure," with a "rumbling drum fill reminiscent of 'Peggy Sue' [by Buddy Holly]" and with an emphasis "on melodically twangy guitar hooks rather than sheer rock force." Billboard said that it was a throwback to the "crisp guitar base" of earlier Foreigner hits, rather than the "synthesizer-tinged melodic pop" of their more recent hits, "Lou Gramm's vocal readings and the spare production" were consistent with their recent successful charting songs.
