= Shadow King (band) =

American hard rock supergroup

- Origin: Los Angeles, California, United States
- Genres: Hard rock
- Years active: 1990–1991
- Label: Atlantic
- Past members: Lou Gramm; Vivian Campbell; Bruce Turgon; Kevin Valentine

Shadow King was an American hard rock supergroup. It was formed in 1990, by former Foreigner lead singer Lou Gramm, Dio and Def Leppard guitarist Vivian Campbell, drummer Kevin Valentine of Donnie Iris and the Cruisers, and bass player Bruce Turgon who later joined Foreigner with Gramm after the split of Shadow King.

Vivian Campbell and Bruce Turgon both also played with Lou Gramm as a solo artist previous to Shadow King, with Campbell playing on Long Hard Look, and Turgon playing on Ready or Not and Long Hard Look.

They released a self-titled album in 1991. Although plans were made for a tour, they performed only once, at the Astoria Theatre in London, England, on December 13, 1991. Rick Seratte (Poco, Rick Springfield) joined the band for this performance providing backup vocals and keyboards. Shortly afterward, Vivian Campbell announced he was leaving Shadow King to join Def Leppard. Although replacements were considered, the band members eventually went their separate ways, with Gramm rejoining Foreigner in 1992 bringing in Turgon along with him.

== Band members ==
- Lou Gramm – lead vocals, percussion
- Vivian Campbell – lead and acoustic guitars, backing vocals, keyboards
- Bruce Turgon – bass, backing vocals, rhythm guitar, keyboards
- Kevin Valentine – drums, backing vocals

== Discography ==
=== Studio albums ===
Title	Album details
Shadow King	Release date: October 1, 1991; Label: Atlantic Records
