= Records (album) =

Compilation album by Foreigner
- Released: November 29, 1982
- Recorded: 1976–1981
- Genres: Hard rock; arena rock
- Length: 39:23
- Label: Atlantic
- Producers: Roy Thomas Baker, Mick Jones, Robert John "Mutt" Lange, Gary Lyons, Ian McDonald, Keith Olsen, John Sinclair

Foreigner chronology
4 (1981)	Records (1982)	Agent Provocateur (1984)

Professional ratings
Review scores
Source	Rating
AllMusic	4.5/5 stars
Q	4/5 stars

Records is a compilation album by the British-American rock band Foreigner, released on November 29, 1982, to span the band's first four albums through 1981. Along with their second album, Double Vision, this release is the group's best-selling record. It has been certified 7× platinum by the RIAA.

== Track listing ==
All tracks are written by Mick Jones and Lou Gramm, except where noted.

Side one
No.	Title	Writer(s)	Original album	Length
1.	"Cold as Ice" (Single Mix)		Foreigner (1977)	3:19
2.	"Double Vision" (Single Version)		Double Vision (1978)	3:29
3.	"Head Games"		Head Games (1979)	3:37
4.	"Waiting for a Girl Like You" (Single Mix)		4 (1981)	4:35
5.	"Feels Like the First Time" (Edit)	Jones	Foreigner	3:28

Side two
No.	Title	Writer(s)	Original album	Length
6.	"Urgent" (Single Version)	Jones	4	3:57
7.	"Dirty White Boy" (Single Version)		Head Games	3:13
8.	"Juke Box Hero" (Single Version)		4	4:03
9.	"Long, Long Way From Home" (Single Mix)	Jones; Gramm; Ian McDonald	Foreigner	2:47
10.	"Hot Blooded" (Live)		Double Vision	6:55
Total length:				39:38

== Personnel ==
Band members

- Lou Gramm – lead vocals, percussion
- Mick Jones – acoustic guitar, electric guitar, piano, keyboard, background vocals, Fender Rhodes, bass (on track 10)
- Ian McDonald – horns (tracks 1–3, 5, 7, 9)
- Al Greenwood – keyboards, synthesizer (tracks 1–3, 5, 7, 9)
- Ed Gagliardi – bass and background vocals (on tracks 1–2, 5, 9)
- Rick Wills – bass, background vocals (on tracks 3–4, 6–8)
- Dennis Elliott – drums

Additional musicians

- Thomas Dolby – keyboards, synthesizer (tracks 4, 6, 8)
- Larry Fast – keyboards, synthesizer (track 8)
- Michael Fonfara – keyboard (track 6)
- Robert John "Mutt" Lange, Ian Lloyd – background vocals (tracks 4, 6, 8)
- Bob Mayo – guitar, keyboard textures, and background vocals (track 4)
- Mark Rivera – saxophone, background vocals (track 6, 9), clavinet (track 9)
- Junior Walker – tenor saxophone (track 6)

Production

- Producer: Roy Thomas Baker, Mick Jones, Robert John "Mutt" Lange, Gary Lyons, Ian McDonald, Keith Olsen, John Sinclair
- Engineers: Jimmy Douglass, Dave Wittman, Geoff Workman
- Mastering: George Marino at Sterling Sound
- 1995 Remastering: Ted Jensen at Sterling Sound
- Art direction: Lynn Dreese Breslin, Bob Defrin
- Design: Lynn Dreese Breslin, Bob Defrin
- Photography: Allen Levine, Frank Moscati

== Charts ==
Chart (1983)	Peak position
Australian Albums (Kent Music Report)	26
Canada Top Albums/CDs (RPM)	36
German Albums (Offizielle Top 100)	22
Japanese Albums (Oricon)	61
UK Albums (Official Charts)	58
US Billboard 200	10

== Certifications ==
Region	Certification	Certified units/sales
Germany (BVMI)	Gold	250,000^{^}
Switzerland (IFPI Switzerland)	Gold	25,000^{^}
United Kingdom (BPI)	Silver	60,000^{^}
United States (RIAA)	7× Platinum	7,000,000^{^}
^{^} Shipments figures based on certification alone.
