= Bruce Turgon =

American musician, songwriter and producer

- Born: April 25, 1952 (age 73); North Chili, New York, U.S.
- Genres: Rock, hard rock
- Occupation(s): Musician, songwriter, producer
- Instrument(s): Bass guitar, keyboards, synthesizer, guitar
- Years active: 1970–present
- Website: www.bruceturgon.com

Bruce Turgon (born April 25, 1952) is an American bass guitarist, guitarist, vocalist, songwriter and producer. Bruce has played in several bands throughout his career including: Foreigner, The Lou Gramm Band, Shadow King, Steve Stevens, Warrior, Black Sheep and Showcase.

== Biography ==
Turgon was born and raised in North Chili, New York, a suburb of Rochester, and near the hometown of future bandmate and singer Lou Gramm. Turgon began playing as a multi-instrumentalist in elementary school. In high school, he joined the Rochester-based cover band Showcase, competing in the same market as the Gramm-fronted band Poor Heart. Turgon and Gramm started the band Black Sheep in late 1971, which built a strong regional following over the next two years. The Gramm-Turgon EP Stick Around, which led the group to be signed to Capitol, was released on Chrysalis in 1974. The band released two albums in 1974, and was poised for continued success when a highway accident in 1975 damaged their equipment, causing them to lose the support-act-slot for Kiss that year. Turgon left New York for Los Angeles, eventually writing, recording and touring with Billy Thorpe, Nick Gilder, Prism and Warrior, in addition to performing around the Los Angeles area with his own bands. Turgon co-wrote the song "My Way" along with Paul Stanley and Desmond Child for the platinum Kiss album Crazy Nights in 1987.

=== The Lou Gramm Band ===
Turgon's long association with his friend Gramm led to writing and recording Gramm’s first solo album Ready or Not, which yielded the hit single "Midnight Blue". Ready or Not charted at number 27 in the United States. The single "Midnight Blue" was number one on the Hot Mainstream Rock Tracks. A second solo album: Long Hard Look was released, yielding the top ten hit "Just Between You and Me," and "True Blue Love," which reached the Top 40. Turgon also contributed a song to the soundtrack for the horror film The Lost Boys (1987) entitled "Lost in the Shadows." Gramm attempted to rejuvenate his solo career in 2003 with a band that included Turgon on bass, Rocket Ritchotte on guitar, Kevin Neal on drums, John Purdell on keyboards (who suddenly died very early during the tour), and Gary Corbett on keyboards. This initial lineup chose to take different paths following the death of Gramm's mother and father.

=== Steve Stevens Atomic Playboys ===
In between recording of Gramm’s second album Long Hard Look and its subsequent tour, Turgon toured with Steve Stevens in support of his solo album Atomic Playboys (1989). The touring band featured Steve Stevens on guitar, Perry McCarty on vocals (formerly in Warrior with Turgon), Gregg Gerson on drums, Phil Ashley on keyboards, and Turgon on bass guitar. Atomic Playboys was Steve Stevens first solo recording and yielded the music video "Atomic Playboys" with Turgon on bass.

=== Shadow King ===
Turgon and Gramm formed the short-lived band Shadow King in 1991 along with guitarist Vivian Campbell (Dio, Whitesnake, Riverdogs and Def Leppard) and drummer Kevin Valentine (Godz, The Lou Gramm Band, Kiss, and Neverland.) They released a self-titled album and contributed a song ("One Dream") to the film Highlander II: The Quickening (starring Sean Connery and Christopher Lambert). Turgon co-wrote nine of the ten tracks on the debut album, and handled multiple instruments, arrangements and programming duties. The video "I Want You" received some play on MTV. Although plans were made for a tour, they performed only once, at the Astoria Theatre in London, England, on December 13, 1991. Vivian Campbell announced shortly afterward that he was leaving Shadow King to join Def Leppard. Although replacements were considered, the band members eventually went their separate ways. Lou Gramm performed the Bad Company classic "Can't Get Enough" on stage with former bandmate Vivian Campbell and Def Leppard when their tour made a stop in Gramm's hometown of Rochester, New York.

=== Foreigner era ===
When Gramm rejoined Foreigner in 1992, Turgon was hired to play bass in place of the departing Rick Wills. Three new songs were recorded for the compilation The Very Best ... and Beyond: "Soul Doctor", "Prisoner of Love" and "With Heaven on Our Side." Foreigner then released their eighth studio album Mr. Moonlight in 1995, with several songs co-written by Turgon, including the single "Until the End of Time." Several tours followed, returning Foreigner to the classic rock spotlight, and once again proving the band to be a successful touring act.

=== Projects and solo efforts ===
Turgon has become increasingly involved in television, movie and documentary soundtrack work over the last ten years, contributing to shows on HBO, Showtime, PBS, and Warren Miller Films. Turgon released his first solo album in 2005, entitled Outside Looking In. The album features the tracks "Living a Lie," "Any Other Time," and the title track "Outside Looking In" featuring Ronnie Montrose on lead guitar and ex-Montrose member Denny Carmassi on drums. Turgon worked on a collaboration album with Redding, California-based electronic musician Craig Padilla, titled Places of Power. The CD Now Is the Hour was released January 23, 2009 on the Blistering Records label and featured former Endless Summer Beach Band member Philip Bardowell on lead vocals. Turgon participated in the posthumous solo album 10x10, by Ronnie Montrose. Recorded in 2003, but not released until 2017, along with an all-star cast, Turgon was featured on lead vocals for the track "One Good Reason" and on backing vocals for the track "Head On Straight". Turgon has remained seemingly inactive since his 2009 contributions.

== Discography ==
=== Black Sheep ===
- Stick Around EP (1974)
- Black Sheep (1974)
- Encouraging Words (1975)

=== Lou Gramm ===
- Ready or Not (1987)
- The Lost Boys (film soundtrack; contributed one song, "Lost in the Shadows", 1987)
- Long Hard Look (1989)

=== Shadow King ===
- Shadow King (1991)
- Highlander II: The Quickening (film soundtrack; contributed one song, "One Dream") (1991)

=== Foreigner ===
- Mr. Moonlight (1994)

=== Bruce Turgon ===
- Outside Looking In (2005)

=== Places of Power ===
- Now Is The Hour (2009)

=== Ronnie Montrose ===
- 10x10 ("One Good Reason") (2017)
