= Grammatico =

Grammatico is an Italian surname. Notable people with the surname include:

- Lou Grammatico (born 1950), American singer known professionally as Lou Gramm
- Maria Grammatico, Italian chef and entrepreneur
