= Don Mancuso =

- Born: March 26, 1955 (age 71); Rochester, New York, U.S.
- Genres: Rock; hard rock
- Years active: 1967–present
- Website: www.donmancuso.com

Don Mancuso (born March 26, 1955) is an American rock music guitarist and songwriter best known for his role as guitarist and co-writer for the rock band Black Sheep as well as The Lou Gramm Band and The Voice of Foreigner. He also has a successful solo career and continues to work with Phil Naro in DDrive. He is also working with Regi Hendrix on his first solo effort.

== Biography ==
Dee/Donald Mancuso attended Greece Olympia High School in Rochester, New York, and graduated in 1973. He attended the College of Marin for music and graduated from Monroe Community College with an AAS degree in Electronics Engineering in 1988.

=== Pre-solo work ===
Mancuso began his music career playing guitar in Black Sheep. After the band released their self-titled Black Sheep and Encouraging Words, he continued to write and record with groups such as Cheater, Lou Gramm Band, Johnny Smoke, The Park Ave Band, Phil Naro and Celtic Fire.

=== The Lou Gramm Band ===
In 2004, Mancuso was asked to join his former Black Sheep bandmate (and former Foreigner frontman) Lou Gramm in his new Lou Gramm Band, which also included another Black Sheep alumnus, Bruce Turgon. The band plays old Foreigner hits as well as Lou Gramm Band material, and released a Christian rock album, for which Mancuso wrote half the music that was released in North America, Europe and Asia on Frontiers Records.

== Discography ==
- The Lou Gramm Band: The Lou Gramm Band (2009)
- DDRIVE
  - Straight Up The Middle (2007)
  - 3D (2010) Melodic Revolution Records

=== Solo albums ===
- Now You See It (1999)
- DDRIVE (2004)
- No Strings Attached EP, Melodic Revolution Records (2011)
- It's Christmas, featuring Lou Gramm, Single Melodic Revolution Records (2013)

=== Other albums/DVDs ===
- Black Sheep, Black Sheep, Capitol Records (1975)
- Encouraging Words, Black Sheep, Capitol Records (1976)
- Ten Cent Love Affair, Indie, Cheater (1985)
- Ready or Not, Lou Gramm, Atlantic Records (1987)
- Bridge, Red Heart, Indie (1997)
- Into Your Life, Tom Passamonti, Indie (1998)
- Crime Don't Pay Yet, Indie, Johnny Smoke (1999)
- Flames Of Eviction, Celtic Fire, Indie (2001)
- Glass Mountain, Phil Naro, Indie (2002)
- Jessi Hamilton, Jessi Hamilton, Indie (2002)
- Jessi Hamilton, Indie (2005)
- Don Mancuso's DDRIVE, GFI Records (2004)
- DDRIVE Straight Up The Middle Melodic Revolution Records (2006)
- The Lou Gramm Band, Spectra Records/North America-Frontiers Records/Europe & Asia (2009)
- DDRIVE 3D with special guest Billy Sheehan, including full color 3D art, poster and glasses, Melodic Revolution Records (2010)
- No Strings Attached EP, Melodic Revolution Records (2011)
- It's Christmas Single, Melodic Revolution Records (2012)
- DDrive Critical Mass, Melodic Revolution Records (2013)
- Lisa Gee & the 422 Love & Hate, Indie (2013)
- DDrive Intermission EP, Melodic Revolution Records(2014)
- PFP Paul Fisher Project Beginners Luck, Indie (2014)
- Don Mancuso & DDrive Live at the Rochester International Jazz Festival DVD, Indie (2014)
- Don Mancuso & DDrive To Live & To Love CD, Indie (2017)
- Lisa Gee Various releases with Kenny Aronoff & James LoMenzo CD, Indie (2018)
- Lips Turn Blue CD, MIG Music Germany (2022)
- Lisa Gee EP Love Thing with Carmine Appice & James LoMenzo CD, Deko Ent (2023)
