= In Sudden Walks =

Studio album by Aisles
- Released: June 18, 2009
- Genre: Progressive rock
- Length: 55:24
- Label: Presagio Records|Presagio
- Producer: Germán Vergara

Aisles chronology
The Yearning (2005)	In Sudden Walks (2009)	4:45 AM (2013)

Singles from In Sudden Walks
- 1. "Revolution of Light" Released: May 2010; 2. "Mariachi" Released: November 2010

In Sudden Walks is the second studio album from Chilean progressive-rock band Aisles. It was released independently in June 2009 and later reissued through Presagio Records.

== Critical reception ==
In Sudden Walks was praised by critics worldwide. The album was also nominated for best foreign record of 2009 in the Italian Prog Awards, and the band was invited to open that year's edition of Crescendo Prog Rock Festival in Saint-Palais-sur-Mer (France). César Inca of Progarchives stated,"“In Sudden Walks" may have been one of the 5 most accomplished neo-prog albums of 2009. It is a lovely collection of inventive compositions and bold arrangements" while W.A. Fisher said: ""In Sudden Walks," is brilliant! It is symphonic, melodic, ethnic, emotional, well performed, well-engineered and recorded, beautifully sung, and very fresh and new feeling”. Gibraltar Encyclopedia of Progressive Rock also gave the album a positive review stating,.“If I had to sum up In Sudden Walks in a single word, it would have to be "beautiful". [its] perfect, pristine and inventive production that sometimes makes me think I'm listening to an Alan Parsons Project album. I hope for Aisles' sake, it's just accessible enough that they can continue to make albums of this quality. I'll be looking forward to hearing anything these gents come up with. Truly exceptional music. Very highly recommended!".

== Track listing ==
No.	Title	Length
1.	"Mariachi"	9:59
2.	"Revolution of Light"	4:41
3.	"Summer Fall"	9:56
4.	"The Maiden"	9:28
5.	"Smile of Tears"	4:00
6.	"Hawaii"	14:58

- All songs written by Aisles

== Personnel ==
Aisles:

- Sebastián Vergara – lead vocals.
- Germán Vergara – guitars, vocals, keyboards.
- Felipe Candia – drums, percussion.
- Rodrigo Sepúlveda – guitar, vocals.
- Alejandro Meléndez – keyboards.
- Aston Hayes – bass

Additional musicians:

- Rodrigo Galarce – acoustic bass in “The Maiden”, “Mariachi” and “Smile of Tears”.
- Sebastián Jordán – trumpet it “Mariachi”

Theatrical scene in “Mariachi”

- Gloria Münchmeyer – Old woman
- Julio Jung – Man
- Aline Kuppenheim – Woman
