= Ready or Not =

Ready or Not may refer to:

== Film and television ==
- Ready or Not (2009 film), an American comedy film
- Ready or Not (2019 film), an American comedy horror film
- Ready or Not 2: Here I Come, an American comedy horror film sequel to the 2019 film
- Ready or Not (British TV series), a 2018 comedy game show
- Ready or Not (Canadian TV series), a 1993–1997 teen drama series

== Music ==
=== Albums ===
- Ready or Not (Grateful Dead album), 2019
- Ready or Not (Keith Frank album) or the title song, 2000
- Ready or Not (Lou Gramm album) or the title song (see below), 1987
- Ready or Not (Miriam Yeung album) or the title song, 2011
- Ready or Not (Young JV album) or the title song, 2009
- Ready or Not, an EP by Pop Evil, 2006

=== Songs ===
- "Ready or Not" (After 7 song), 1990
- "Ready or Not" (Bridgit Mendler song), 2012
- "Ready or Not" (Fugees song), 1996; interpolating a song by the Delfonics

- "Ready or Not Here I Come (Can't Hide from Love)", a 1968 song by the Delfonics

- "Ready or Not" (Lou Gramm song), 1987
- "Ready or Not" (Momoland song), 2020
- "Ready or Not" (R.I.O. song), 2013
- "Ready or Not"/"Everytime", by A1, 1999
- "Ready or Not" (Brakence song), 2026
- "Ready or Not", by Britt Nicole from Gold, 2012
- "Ready or Not", by Cascada from Evacuate the Dancefloor, 2009
- "Ready or Not", by Fitz and the Tantrums from All the Feels, 2019
- "Ready or Not", by Helen Reddy from We'll Sing in the Sunshine, 1978
- "Ready or Not", by Herbie Hancock from Feets, Don't Fail Me Now, 1979
- "Ready or Not", by Jackson Browne from For Everyman, 1973
- "Ready or Not", by the Lightning Seeds from Dizzy Heights, 1996
- "Ready or Not", by Michael Hedges from Live on the Double Planet, 1987
- "Ready or Not", by Shakey Graves, 2023
- "Ready or Not", by Shinee from Lucifer, 2010
- "Ready or Not", by Wax from American English, 1987

== Other uses ==
- Ready or Not (novel), a 2005 novel by Meg Cabot
- Ready or Not (video game), a 2023 tactical first-person shooter

== See also ==
- Hide-and-seek, a children's game initiated by a cry of "Ready or not, here I come!"
