= Cressida (band) =

British progressive rock band

- Also known as: Charge
- Origin: United Kingdom
- Genres: Progressive rock
- Years active: 1968–1970
- Label: Vertigo Records
- Past members: Angus Cullen; Kevin McCarthy; Iain Clark; John Heyworth; Lol Coker; Peter Jennings; John Culley

Cressida was a British progressive rock band, best known for its mellow, symphonic sound. The band was active from 1968 to 1970, and recorded two albums for Vertigo.

== Career ==
The roots of Cressida were sown in March 1968, when guitarist "Rock & Roll" John Heyworth answered an advertisement in Melody Maker, before travelling to London to join The Dominators, a band whose situation he later described as "hopeless - until Angus Cullen applied for the lead singer spot". Cullen and Heyworth hit it off immediately, and Heyworth was invited to stay at Cullen's family flat in Barkston Gardens near Earl's Court. The pair settled down to some serious writing, eventually welcoming Lol Coker (Hammond organ), bassist Kevin McCarthy, and drummer Iain Clark to the fold.

The line-up complete, the band began rehearsing, working on arranging original songs that Angus and John had been writing as well as some standards. Originally calling themselves Charge, the band's early setlists included covers of songs by The Doors ("Spanish Caravan"), The Drifters ("Save the Last Dance for Me") and Spirit ("Fresh Garbage"), alongside original compositions by Cullen and Heyworth.

In December 1968, Cressida was auditioned by Ossie Byrne, an Australian record producer who had discovered the Bee Gees, produced several of their early hits and brought them over to the UK in the sixties. He was impressed with the band, and in January 1969, Cressida signed a management contract with Ossie Byrne Productions. By this time, the band had changed their name to Cressida and shortly after, the band went off to Germany.. A couple of gigs in Frankfurt were followed by a stint at the Star Club in Hamburg, a venue made famous by the Beatles and many other Liverpool groups.

In March 1969, after further extended trips to Germany and Switzerland, the band returned home, weary and broke. Encouraged by Ossie Byrne, who wanted new material to take to the record companies, the band threw themselves into writing and rehearsing new songs before they went into Central Sound Studios on Denmark Street, London to record their first demos. Ossie Byrne immediately began taking the demo tracks around the record labels. Initially there was talk of the band signing to Elektra Records in the US. However, before that happened, Philips Records entered the scene and quickly offered to sign them to their new progressive label, Vertigo and the band eventually became one of the first bands to sign to Vertigo.

By August, their sets honed at the Star Club and armed with new material, they started to pick up gigs around London. At the same time, Lol Coker announced he was leaving to return to Liverpool to get married and take over the family business. His departure meant a new keyboard player had to be found quickly.,

Peter Jennings was then recruited as a replacement on keyboards. "I was auditioned at the Roebuck pub in Chiswick, a place they sometimes used for rehearsals", he later remembered. "I imagine we ran through a 12-bar or two and possibly they tried me out on one of the numbers from their set, but anyway they liked the way I fitted in and I joined them that day". Other forays into Europe included a trip to Bratislava in November 1969, where they performed at the end of a week's competition between various bands from the Eastern European Soviet bloc; a week supporting Black Sabbath at Brussels' Theatre 140; and a performance at the Open Circus (an event held in a large tent with lion taming, fire eating and other side shows) in Rouen, France, alongside Brian Auger, Barclay James Harvest, Man and Circus.

Cressida mostly played the university and college circuits, and regularly performed at London clubs such as the Speakeasy, Revolution, Blaises and the Marquee. The first LP was recorded at Wessex Studios with Byrne producing. It consisted of songs by either Cullen or Heyworth (who handled lead vocals on one), plus one contribution each by Jennings and Clark.

Cressida went through a difficult phase when Heyworth was forced to leave in early 1970. Around this time, the band recorded a more commercial track intended for single release, "Situation", but Vertigo chose not to issue it. The song is now available on a double-CD release of the band's complete recordings, The Vertigo Years Anthology 1969-1971.

Heyworth (who would contribute one last song to the second album, although he did not play on it) was replaced by John Culley, who had been playing with Geno Washington. The new line-up recorded Cressida's second LP, Asylum, later in 1970 (again with Byrne producing, and with orchestral arrangements by Graeme Hall), but it was released posthumously in 1971, the band having broken up in September 1970. Noted jazz flautist Harold McNair guested on the song "Lisa" from the album.

After the band split up, Clark joined Uriah Heep and went on to record Look at Yourself. McCarthy joined Tranquility as rhythm guitarist and vocalist rather than bassist. Culley linked up with Black Widow and from 1981 to 1984, joined Colin Tench to launch the London six-piece progressive rock band Odin. In 2012 Culley guested on a debut album by Corvus Stone.

Heyworth died in January 2010. In 2011, three of the four surviving original members of the band, Angus Cullen, Iain Clark, and Kevin McCarthy got together again with Peter Jennings. The band had been approached by Record Collector Magazine, who were interested in releasing a limited edition vinyl album of previously unreleased and lost demos that Cressida recorded back in 1969, prior to obtaining a recording contract with Vertigo. They were prompted to play a one-off, reunion gig at The Underworld, Camden Town which took place on 2 December 2011, with the album, entitled "The Lost Tapes", being released to coincide with the reunion.

In his review of the Cressida reunion gig in December 2011, Ian Shirley of Record Collector Magazine wrote, "My only regret is that this magical ninety minutes was not bottled by a live recording as it was a fantastic night and was, without doubt, one of the gigs of the year.”

Lee Dorian, in his review in Classic Rock Magazine in Jan 2012 wrote, "Cressida’s self-titled 1970 debut and 1971 follow-up Asylum are heralded as two of the greatest moments of the Vertigo ‘swirl’ label.”

In September 2013, they appeared at the Melloboat festival in Sweden, on which occasion Choices, a limited edition LP of archive material personally selected by Opeth's Mikael Åkerfeldt (a longtime fan of the band) was released.

The band never had any opportunity to play in the United States, since Mercury chose not to release either album in the US (their two albums were sold in the US as imports).

Olav Wyper, the Founder and Managing Director of Vertigo Records during an interview he gave to Vinyl Press Magazine in March 2015 said, "That first Cressida album is as good as it gets – those guys were entitled to the crown of ultimate “progressive’ band as much as King Crimson, but unless you are into Vertigo or deeply into progressive music from the era, my bet is you never heard of the band”.

Sid Smith in his article "The Albums that Built Prog" in 2012 wrote, "Posterity rewarded them with an album that’s come to be recognised as a touchstone of the UK’s progressive rock of the late 60s and early 70s.”

== Band members ==
- Angus Cullen - lead vocals, acoustic guitar, percussion (1968-1970, 2011–2013)
- Kevin McCarthy - bass (1968-1970, 2011–2013)
- Iain Clark - drums, percussion (1968-1970, 2011–2013)
- John Heyworth - guitars, vocals (1968–70)
- Lol Coker - organ (1968–69)
- Peter Jennings - organ, piano (1969–70, 2011–2013)
- John Culley - guitars (1970)
- Roger Niven - guitars (2011–2013)

== Discography ==
- 1970 - Cressida (Vertigo)
1. "To Play Your Little Game" (Heyworth) 3:15
2. "Winter Is Coming Again" (Heyworth) 4:42
3. "Time For Bed" (Cullen) 2:18
4. "Cressida" (Cullen) 3:57
5. "Home And Where I Long To Be" (Heyworth) 4:04
6. "Depression" (Cullen) 5:02
7. "One Of A Group" (Jennings) 3:35
8. "Lights In My Mind" (Heyworth) 2:45
9. "The Only Earthman In Town" (Heyworth) 3:32
10. "Spring '69" (Cullen) 2:14
11. "Down Down" (Heyworth) 4:15
12. "Tomorrow Is a Whole New Day" (Clark) 5:19
- 1971 - Asylum (Vertigo)
1. "Asylum" (Cullen) 3:31
2. "Munich" (Jennings) 9:30
3. "Goodbye Post Office Tower Goodbye" (Cullen) 2:47
4. "Survivor" (Cullen) 1:32
5. "Reprieved" (Jennings) 2:29
6. "Lisa" (Cullen) 5:05
7. "Summer Weekend of A Lifetime" (Cullen) 3:20
8. "Let Them Come When They Will" (Heyworth) 11:46
- 2012 - Trapped In Time - The Lost Tapes (Esoteric)

(All but 4 tracks of this release feature the original line-up with Lol Coker on organ. On tracks 9–11 and 13, Coker is replaced by Peter Jennings, and on track 13, John Heyworth is replaced by John Culley.) (tracks 5, 8, 11 and 12 were songs that were not included on the first two albums)

1. "To Play Your Little Game" (Heyworth) (original demo version; later re-recorded for the first album)
2. "Winter Is Coming Again" (Heyworth) (original demo version; later re-recorded for the first album)
3. "Cressida" (Cullen) (original demo version; later re-recorded for the first album)
4. "Depression" (Cullen) (original demo version; later re-recorded for the first album)
5. "Sad Eyed Fairy" (Cullen) (original demo version; not included on any album and previously unreleased)
6. "Lights In My Mind" (Heyworth) (original demo version; later re-recorded for the first album)
7. "Let Them Come When They Will" (Heyworth) (original demo version; later re-recorded in an extended version for the second album)
8. "Situation" (Heyworth) (original demo version; later re-recorded for a single which was never released)
9. "The Only Earthman In Town" (Heyworth) (original demo version; later re-recorded for the first album)
10. "Down Down" (Heyworth) (original demo version; later re-recorded for the first album)
11. "Mental State" (Heyworth) (original demo version; not included on any album and previously unreleased)
12. "Silent Light" (Cullen) (original demo version; not included on any album and previously unreleased)
13. "Situation" (Alternate Version) (Heyworth) (unissued single)
- 2012 - The Vertigo Years Anthology 1969-1971 (Esoteric)

Disc 1 includes all tracks from the first, self-titled album, plus :

1. "Lights In My Mind" (Demo) (Heyworth)
2. "Mental State" (Demo) (Heyworth)

Disc 2 includes all tracks from Asylum plus :

1. "Situation" (Previously Unreleased) (Heyworth)
2. "Depression" (BBC Sounds Of The Seventies) (Cullen)
3. "Winter Is Coming Again" (BBC Sounds Of The Seventies) (Heyworth)

== Covers ==
A cover version of "Goodbye Post Office Tower Goodbye" was recorded by New Zealand band Powerhouse (Move On Up: The Unreleased 1972 HMV Tapes).
