= 4 (Foreigner album) =

Studio album by Foreigner
- Released: July 3, 1981
- Recorded: September 1980 − April 1981
- Studio: Electric Lady Studios (New York City)
- Genres: Hard rock; pop rock; arena rock
- Length: 42:10
- Label: Atlantic
- Producers: Robert John "Mutt" Lange; Mick Jones

Foreigner chronology
Head Games (1979)	4 (1981)	Records (1982)

Singles from 4
- 1. "Urgent" Released: June 1981; 2. "Waiting for a Girl Like You" Released: October 1981 (US); 3. "Juke Box Hero" Released: October 1981 (UK); 4. "Don't Let Go" Released: March 1982 (IRL); 5. "Break It Up" Released: April 1982; 6. "Luanne" Released: July 1982; 7. "Girl on the Moon" Released: 1982 (NL)

Alternative cover

Professional ratings
Review scores
Source	Rating
AllMusic	4.5/5 stars
Q	4/5 stars
Sounds	4/5 stars

4, also known as Foreigner 4, is the fourth studio album by the British-American rock band Foreigner, released on July 3, 1981, by Atlantic Records. The album's name signifies that it is the band's fourth studio album and also the fact that the band's membership had reduced from six to four members. Musically, it showed Foreigner shifting from hard rock to more accessible mainstream rock and pop music. The release of 4 coincided with the launch of MTV later that August.

4 was a commercial success worldwide, holding the No. 1 position on the Billboard 200 chart for a total of 10 weeks. It eventually sold over six million copies in the U.S. alone. Several of its singles were hits, including "Urgent", "Waiting for a Girl Like You" and "Juke Box Hero".

On September 12, 2025, Rhino Records released a three CD Deluxe Edition of 4, with a 2025 remix of the original album, as well as unreleased songs, alternative/early versions & mixes, instrumental rough mixes, and live versions from their 1981-1982 tour.

== Background and writing ==
The album was originally titled Silent Partners and later was changed to 4, reflecting both the fact that it was Foreigner's fourth album and that the band now consisted of four members. In 1981, art studio Hipgnosis was asked to design a cover based on the original title, and it developed a black-and-white image of a young man in bed with a pair of binoculars suspended in the air overhead. The design was rejected by the band's management as they felt that it was "too homosexual." The replacement cover for 4 was designed by Bob Defrin and modeled after an old fashioned film leader. Hipgnosis received credit for the design of the label.

Both Ian McDonald and Al Greenwood had departed the group before the recording of 4, partly because they wanted to take a more significant role in writing songs while Mick Jones wanted to control the songwriting along with Lou Gramm. As a result, all of the songs on the album are compositions by Jones and/or Gramm. McDonald, who had played saxophone and guitar, and Greenwood, who had played keyboards, were replaced by session musicians, including Junior Walker, who played the saxophone solo in the bridge of "Urgent", and a young Thomas Dolby. Dolby, who was not an admirer of the band, ended up on the album due to a misunderstanding on his part: "I got a message from a mate in London saying 'Mick Jones is trying to get hold of you to do a keyboard session in New York.' And I thought ‘This is fantastic. The Clash have finally given me the call'... It turned out to be not that Mick Jones at all, it was the British Mick Jones that had gone to America to form Foreigner."

During the course of the 8 months in which the album was recorded, the starting time of the band's daily work in the recording studio transitioned from noon to midnight. This changing schedule inspired the opening song on the album, "Night Life." According to Jones, "The later it got at night, the bigger the buzz got, and a lot of weird characters, some of them hookers, would appear. It was a big mixture of a lot of different characters – so that was the inspiration for opening song, 'Night Life.'” Due to the lengthy recording, however, Lange had to leave towards the end to fulfill commitments with Def Leppard on their High 'n' Dry album.

== Reception ==
The editors of Classic Rock called 4 Foreigner's "masterpiece." Ultimate Classic Rock critic Matt Wardlaw rated four of the songs from 4—"Juke Box Hero", "Waiting for a Girl Like You", "Urgent" and "Night Life"—among Foreigner's top 10 songs. Ultimate Classic Rock critic Eduardo Rivadavia rated two of the songs from 4—"Girl on the Moon" and "Woman in Black"—among Foreigner's 10 most-underrated songs. Classic Rock critic Malcolm Dome also rated two songs from 4 among Foreigner's 10 most underrated—"I’m Gonna Win," which he compares to "Juke Box Hero," at No. 8 and "Night Life,"—which he praises for its "confident energy," at No. 1. PopMatters critic Evan Sawdey called "Night Life" a "remarkably limp album opener."

Mick Jones has rated three of the songs from 4 ("Urgent," "Juke Box Hero" and "Girl on the Moon") among his 11 favorite Foreigner songs.

== Track listing ==
=== Original release ===
All tracks are written by Mick Jones and Lou Gramm, except where noted.

Side one
No.	Title	Writer(s)	Length
1.	"Night Life"		3:48
2.	"Juke Box Hero"		4:18
3.	"Break It Up"	Jones	4:11
4.	"Waiting for a Girl Like You"		4:49
5.	"Luanne"		3:25 (Note: Some vinyl editions list "Luanne" as 3:11)

Side two
No.	Title	Writer(s)	Length
6.	"Urgent"	Jones	4:29
7.	"I'm Gonna Win"	Jones	4:51
8.	"Woman in Black"	Jones	4:42
9.	"Girl on the Moon"		3:49
10.	"Don't Let Go"		3:58
Total length:			42:10

Bonus tracks on 2002 reissue, recorded in 1999
No.	Title	Length
11.	"Juke Box Hero" ("Nearly Unplugged" Version)	3:06
12.	"Waiting for a Girl Like You" ("Nearly Unplugged" Version)	2:50

=== 2025 Deluxe Edition ===
All tracks are written by Mick Jones and Lou Gramm, except where noted.

Disc one; 2025 Remix
No.	Title	Writer(s)	Length
1.	"Night Life"		3:51
2.	"Juke Box Hero"		4:22
3.	"Break It Up"	Jones	4:14
4.	"Waiting for a Girl Like You"		4:51
5.	"Luanne"		3:27
6.	"Urgent"	Jones	4:30
7.	"I'm Gonna Win"	Jones	4:53
8.	"Woman in Black"	Jones	4:48
9.	"Girl on the Moon"		3:50
10.	"Don't Let Go"		3:49

Disc two; Unreleased Songs, Alternative/Early Versions & Mixes
No.	Title	Writer(s)	Length
1.	"Fool If You Love Him" (Previously Unreleased)		4:12
2.	"Love So Much Better" (Previously Unreleased)		5:18
3.	"Knockout Power" (Previously Unreleased)		3:54
4.	"Don't Let Go" (Early Version)		3:48
5.	"Jealous Lover" (Previously Unreleased)		4:05
6.	"Night Life" (Early Version)		3:16
7.	"Take One Guitar" ("Juke Box Hero" Early Version)		5:05
8.	"Juke Box Hero" (Early Version)		5:25
9.	"Waiting for a Girl Like You" (Piano & Vocal Mix)		1:23
10.	"Waiting for a Girl Like You" (Early Version)		4:36
11.	"Luanne" (Early Version)		4:06
12.	"Urgent" (Vocals on Chorus Only)	Jones	6:04
13.	"I'm Gonna Win" (A Cappella Vocal)	Jones	0:23
14.	"I'm Gonna Win" (Early Version)	Jones	5:21
15.	"Woman in Black" (Early Version 1)	Jones	3:31
16.	"Woman in Black" (Early Version 2)	Jones	4:05

Disc three; Instrumental Rough Mixes 1980
No.	Title	Writer(s)	Length
1.	"Night Life" (Instrumental Rough Mix)		3:37
2.	"Juke Box Hero" (Instrumental Rough Mix)		5:20
3.	"Break It Up" (Instrumental Rough Mix)	Jones	4:05
4.	"Waiting for a Girl Like You" (Instrumental Rough Mix)		4:21
5.	"Luanne" (Instrumental Rough Mix)		3:42
6.	"Urgent" (Instrumental Rough Mix - Bass Version 1)	Jones	5:58
7.	"Urgent" (Instrumental Rough Mix - Bass Version 2)	Jones	6:19
8.	"I'm Gonna Win" (Instrumental Rough Mix - Version 1)	Jones	5:08
9.	"I'm Gonna Win" (Instrumental Rough Mix - Version 2)	Jones	5:19
10.	"Woman in Black" (Instrumental Rough Mix - With Intro)	Jones	4:59
11.	"Woman in Black" (Instrumental Rough Mix - Version 2)	Jones	4:43
12.	"Girl on the Moon" (Instrumental Rough Mix)		4:51
13.	"Don't Let Go" (Instrumental Rough Mix)		4:07
14.	"Fool If You Love Him" (Instrumental Rough Mix)		4:26
15.	"Love So Much Better" (Instrumental Rough Mix)		5:37

Disc four; 4 Live Tour 1981-1982
No.	Title	Writer(s)	Length
1.	"Long, Long Way from Home" (Live at the Birmingham Odeon, Birmingham, England, August 25, 1981)	Jones, Gramm, Ian McDonald	3:18
2.	"Dirty White Boy" (Live at Anaheim Stadium, Anaheim, CA, July 17, 1982)		3:36
3.	"Blue Morning, Blue Day" (Live at Anaheim Stadium, Anaheim, CA, July 17, 1982)		3:32
4.	"Luanne" (Live at Anaheim Stadium, Anaheim, CA, July 17, 1982)		3:35
5.	"Cold as Ice" (Live at Westfalenhalle, Dortmund, Germany, December 19, 1981)		5:30
6.	"Waiting for a Girl Like You" (Live at Westfalenhalle, Dortmund, Germany, December 19, 1981)		5:16
7.	"Head Games" (Live at Westfalenhalle, Dortmund, Germany, December 19, 1981)		4:12
8.	"Starrider" (Live at Anaheim Stadium, Anaheim, CA, July 17, 1982)	Jones, Al Greenwood	7:37
9.	"Woman in Black" (Live at Anaheim Stadium, Anaheim, CA, July 17, 1982)	Jones	6:36
10.	"Urgent" (Live at the Birmingham Odeon, Birmingham, England, August 25, 1981)		5:35
11.	"Double Vision" (Live at Anaheim Stadium, Anaheim, CA, July 17, 1982)		4:16
12.	"Juke Box Hero" (Live at Anaheim Stadium, Anaheim, CA, July 17, 1982)		6:00
13.	"Feels Like the First Time" (Live at Anaheim Stadium, Anaheim, CA, July 17, 1982)	Jones	5:16
14.	"Hot Blooded" (Live at Anaheim Stadium, Anaheim, CA, July 17, 1982)		8:36
15.	"Night Life" (Live at Anaheim Stadium, Anaheim, CA, July 17, 1982)		4:59
Total length:			270:49

== Personnel ==
=== Original release ===
==== Foreigner ====
- Lou Gramm – lead vocals, percussion
- Mick Jones – guitars, keyboards, backing vocals
- Rick Wills – bass, backing vocals
- Dennis Elliott – drums, backing vocals

==== Additional personnel ====
- Thomas Dolby – main synthesizers
- Larry Fast – sequential synthesizer (2, 3, 10)
- Bob Mayo – keyboard textures (3, 4)
- Michael Fonfara – keyboard textures (6, 9)
- Hugh McCracken – slide guitar (9)
- Mark Rivera – saxophone (3, 6), backing vocals
- Junior Walker – saxophone solo (6)
- Ian Lloyd – backing vocals
- Robert John "Mutt" Lange – backing vocals

==== Production ====
- Produced by Robert John "Mutt" Lange and Mick Jones
- Recorded and engineered by Dave Wittman (chief engineer) and Tony Platt (basic tracks)
- Second engineer – Brad Samuelsohn
- Assistant engineers – Edwin Hobgood and Michel Sauvage
- Mastered by George Marino at Sterling Sound, New York
- Art direction – Bob Defrin
- Design – Hipgnosis
- Management – Bud Prager

=== Deluxe Edition ===
==== Foreigner ====
- Lou Gramm – lead vocals, percussion
- Mick Jones – guitars, keyboards, backing vocals
- Rick Wills – bass, backing vocals
- Dennis Elliott – drums, backing vocals

==== Additional personnel ====
- Bruce Watson – additional guitar (disc 2: track 1)
- Michael Bluestein – organ, piano (disc 2: track 1)
- Tim Pedersen – percussion (disc 2: track 1)
- Jeff Pilson – backing vocals (disc 2: track 1)
- Luis Maldonado – backing vocals (disc 2: track 1)
- Mark Rivera – saxophone, guitar, synthesizers, flute, backing vocals (disc 4)
- Bob Mayo – keyboards, synthesizers, guitar, backing vocals (disc 4)
- Peter Reilich – synthesizers, organ (disc 4)

==== Production ====
- Produced by Jeff Pilson
- Stereo remix – Wyn Davis and Steve Ornest
- Atmos mixes – Wyn Davis
- Mastered by Ted Jensen at Total Access Recording Studios, Redondo Beach, California
- Liner notes – Jeff Pilson and Hugh Gilmour
- Research, A&R – Hugh Gilmour

== Rereleases ==
4 was released in 2001 in multichannel DVD-Audio, and on September 14, 2011, on hybrid stereo-multichannel Super Audio CD by Warner Japan in its Warner Premium Sound series. It was rereleased in June 2015 by Atlantic Records as premium 180-gram vinyl with its original 1981 track listing.

== Charts ==
=== Weekly charts ===
Chart (1981–1982)	Peak position
Australian Albums (Kent Music Report)	3
Canada Top Albums/CDs (RPM)	2
Dutch Albums (Album Top 100)	12
French Albums (SNEP)	6
German Albums (Offizielle Top 100)	4
Japanese Albums (Oricon)	20
New Zealand Albums (RMNZ)	19
Swedish Albums (Sverigetopplistan)	41
UK Albums (Official Charts)	5
US Billboard 200	1

Chart (2025)	Peak position
Hungarian Physical Albums (MAHASZ)	13

=== Year-end charts ===
Chart (1981)	Position
German Albums (Offizielle Top 100)	16
Chart (1982)	Position
German Albums (Offizielle Top 100)	3

== Certifications ==
Region	Certification	Certified units/sales
Australia (ARIA)	Platinum	50,000^{^}
Canada (Music Canada)	4× Platinum	400,000^{^}
France (SNEP)	Gold	100,000^{*}
Germany (BVMI)	Platinum	500,000^{^}
Israel	Gold	25,000
Japan (RIAJ)	Gold	100,000^{^}
Netherlands (NVPI)	Gold	50,000^{^}
New Zealand (RMNZ)	Gold	7,500^{^}
South Africa (RISA)	Gold	25,000^{*}
United Kingdom (BPI)	Gold	100,000^{^}
United States (RIAA)	6× Platinum	6,000,000^{^}
^{*} Sales figures based on certification alone.^{^} Shipments figures based on certification alone.
