= 4:45 AM =

4:45 am

Studio album by Aisles
- Released: October 29, 2013
- Genres: Progressive rock, rock
- Length: 55:24
- Label: Presagio
- Producer: Germán Vergara

Aisles chronology
In Sudden Walks (2009)	4:45 am (2013)	Hawaii (2016)

Singles from 4:45 am
- 1. "4:45 am" Released: September 2013; 2. "Shallow and Daft" Released: November 2014

4:45 am is the third studio album from Chilean progressive-rock band Aisles. It was released on October 29, 2013, through Presagio Records.

== Critical reception ==
Upon release, the album was met with generally favourable reviews from critics. Brian McKinnon of Prog Rock Music Talk gave 4:45 am a 5/5 review stating, "4:45 AM is their third album and it is nothing short of a masterwork of art. It is the reason people fall in love with music in the first place. If you are in any way a fan of progressive rock, than I cannot recommend Aisles’ 4:45 AM to you enough. If there is a band to take a risk on, then Aisles is that band to do so, because this album is everything that this type of music should strive to be. It is fresh, challenging, inspired, touching, and so much more. A complete experience from start to finish, 4:45 AM is an astounding piece of work for the ages". Progshine also gave the album a positive review stating, "4:45AM is an assured and thrilling work from a talented band that frequently sounds so defiantly original, like no- one other prog band at the moment, and the way they implement their emotive vocals with the same passion that most prog bands only give to their instrumental passages is completely inspiring".

Daniel Fox of Metal Temple gave the album a perfect 10 out of 10.

== Track listing ==
No.	Title	Length
1.	"4:45 am"	4:06
2.	"Gallarda Yarura"	4:32
3.	"Shallow and Daft"	4:52
4.	"Back my Strength"	4:54
5.	"The Sacrifice"	5:08
6.	"The Ship"	0:57
7.	"Intermission"	5:02
8.	"Sorrow"	6:57
9.	"Hero"	8:11
10.	"Melancholia"	10:40

- All songs written by Aisles

== Personnel ==
Aisles:

- Sebastián Vergara – lead vocals.
- Germán Vergara – guitars, vocals, keyboards.
- Felipe Candia – drums, percussion.
- Rodrigo Sepúlveda – guitar, vocals.
- Alejandro Meléndez – keyboards.
- Daniel Baird-Kerr – bass

Additional musicians:

- Constanza Maulén – Vocals on “Sorrow”, “4:45 AM” and “Shallow and Daft
- David Núñez – Violin on “Sorrow”, “Hero and “The Sacrifice”
- Diana Brown – Violin on “Sorrow”, “Hero and “The Sacrifice”
- Valentina Maza – Viola on Violin on “Sorrow”, “Hero and “The Sacrifice”
- Alejandro Barría – Cello on “Sorrow”, “Hero and “The Sacrifice”
- Nelson Arriagada – Contrabass on “Sorrow”, “Hero and “The Sacrifice”
