= Juke Box Hero =

Single by Foreigner

from the album 4
- B-side: "I'm Gonna Win"
- Released: October 2, 1981 (UK): January 27, 1982 (US)
- Genre: Hard rock; arena rock
- Length: 4:18 (album version); 4:05 (single version)
- Label: Atlantic
- Songwriters: Lou Gramm; Mick Jones
- Producer: Robert John "Mutt" Lange

Foreigner singles chronology
"Waiting for a Girl Like You" (1981)	"Juke Box Hero" (1981)	"Break It Up" (1982)

Music video
- "Juke Box Hero" on YouTube

Audio
- "Juke Box Hero" on YouTube

"Juke Box Hero" is a song by British-American rock band Foreigner written by Lou Gramm and Mick Jones from their 1981 album 4. It first entered the Billboard Hot Mainstream Rock Tracks chart in July 1981 and eventually reached #3 on that chart. Released as the album's third single in early 1982, it subsequently went to #26 on the Billboard Hot 100 chart

== Background ==
The song focuses on a boy unable to purchase a ticket to a sold-out rock concert. Listening from outside, he hears "one guitar" and has an epiphany, leading him to buy a guitar and learn to play it. He realizes that with the guitar he has a chance to achieve musical stardom. The song then goes on to describe the struggle he has to stay on top of the music charts, which makes him a "Juke Box Hero". He eventually encounters another fan outside the stage door at one of his concerts, who reminds him of himself and how it all began.

Mick Jones told Songfacts that the song was inspired by an actual fan who stood waiting outside an arena for about five hours in the rain. Impressed by his dedication, Jones decided to take him in and give him a glimpse of what happens backstage at a concert. On July 19, 2016, Lou Gramm said on the Brother Wease radio show in Rochester, New York that the song was about him waiting outside the Rochester War Memorial to see Jimi Hendrix but the show was sold out. Jones has rated it as one of his 11 favorite Foreigner songs. According to Gramm, this is his favorite Foreigner song.

The song was developed out of two separate song ideas that were combined with the help of producer Robert John "Mutt" Lange. One of the ideas was the "Juke Box Hero" portion that Jones had developed and the other was developed by Gramm and had been called "Take One Guitar".

This song was also re-recorded live at a 2005 Las Vegas concert where it includes portions of the Led Zeppelin song "Whole Lotta Love" (from Led Zeppelin II), and released on Foreigner's Extended Versions album. A live version of "Juke Box Hero" was also released on the 2014 album Best of Foreigner 4 & More.

This song later became the namesake of, and was included in, the coming-of-age jukebox musical Jukebox Hero, based on the songs of Foreigner. The musical premiered in February 2019 at the Ed Mirvish Theatre in Toronto, Ontario, with a book by Dick Clement and Ian LaFrenais, and an all-Canadian cast led by Nova Scotian actor/singer Geordie Brown.

== Reception ==
Ultimate Classic Rock critic Matt Wardlaw ranked "Juke Box Hero" as Foreigner's all time greatest song, stating that "for anyone who has ever been on the wrong side of a sold-out concert, "Juke Box Hero" will touch a chord." Billboard called it "a snarling rocker featuring tough guitar breaks and hot vocals." Billboard reviewer Gary Graff rated "Juke Box Hero" to be Foreigner's 5th greatest song.

Although the physical 45 sold fewer than 500,000 copies, "Juke Box Hero" has been certified platinum by the RIAA for over a million digital downloads.

== Personnel ==
=== Foreigner ===
- Lou Gramm – lead vocals
- Mick Jones – lead and rhythm guitars, backing vocals
- Rick Wills – bass guitar, backing vocals
- Dennis Elliott – drums

=== Additional personnel ===
- Thomas Dolby – main synthesizers
- Larry Fast – sequential synthesizer
- Ian Lloyd – backing vocals
- Robert John "Mutt" Lange – backing vocals

== Chart history ==
Chart (1982)	Peak position
Australia (Kent Music Report)	53
Canada RPM Top Singles	39
Germany	24
South Africa (Springbok)	7
UK (The Official Charts Company)	48
US Billboard Hot 100	26
US Billboard Mainstream Rock	3
US Cash Box Top 100	34

== Certifications ==
Region	Certification	Certified units/sales
New Zealand (RMNZ)	Gold	15,000^{‡}
United States (RIAA)	Platinum	1,000,000^{‡}
^{‡} Sales+streaming figures based on certification alone.
