= Aankh Micholi =

Aankh Micholi or Aankh Michouli (lit. 'hide and seek') may refer to:

- Aankh Michouli, 1942 film
- Aankh Micholi (1972 film), 1972 film
- Aankh Micholi (2023 film), 2023 comedy film
- Aankh Micholi (TV series), 2024 Indian TV series

== See also ==
- Hide and Seek (disambiguation)
- Luka Chuppi (lit. 'hide and seek'), a 2019 Indian romantic-comedy film
