= Midnight Blue (Lou Gramm song) =

1987 single by Lou Gramm

Single by Lou Gramm

from the album Ready or Not
- B-side: "Chain of Love"
- Released: January 1987
- Recorded: 1986
- Genre: Rock; pop rock; synth-rock
- Length: 3:54
- Label: Atlantic
- Songwriters: Lou Gramm; Bruce Turgon
- Producers: Pat Moran; Lou Gramm

Lou Gramm singles chronology
"Midnight Blue" (1987)	"Ready or Not" (1987)

"Midnight Blue" is a song by American rock singer-songwriter Lou Gramm, issued as a 7" single in the United States in January 1987 by Atlantic Records. It was the lead-off single from Gramm's debut album, Ready or Not, released in February 1987. An extended remix of the song was available as a 12" single.

== Reception ==
In a contemporary review, Cash Box praised the single as being "riveting" and "triumphant." Bret Adams has described "Midnight Blue" as "a terrific pop/rock song" on AllMusic. He has claimed that "despite its hit status, it's one of the decade's truly underappreciated singles". Stephen Thomas Erlewine, while reviewing the Foreigner retrospective collection Jukebox Heroes: The Foreigner Anthology (2000), has called the song "the last great single of the album-rock era".

The single peaked at number 5 on the US Billboard Hot 100 and spent five weeks on the top of the Mainstream Rock chart, starting on 14 February 1987. "Midnight Blue" has remained Gramm's highest-charting solo hit to date.

== Track listing ==
U.S. 7" single (Atlantic 7-89304)
No.	Title	Writer(s)	Length
1.	"Midnight Blue"	Lou Gramm, Bruce Turgon	3:54
2.	"Chain of Love"	Gramm, Turgon	3:58
Total length:			7:52

German 12" single (Atlantic 786 723-0)
No.	Title	Writer(s)	Length
1.	"Midnight Blue" (extended remix)	Gramm, Turgon	5:23
2.	"Chain of Love"	Gramm, Turgon	3:58
Total length:			9:21

German 12" blue vinyl single (Atlantic 786 723-0)
No.	Title	Writer(s)	Length
1.	"Midnight Blue" (extended remix)	Gramm, Turgon	5:23
2.	"Midnight Blue"	Gramm, Turgon	3:54
3.	"Chain of Love"	Gramm, Turgon	3:58
Total length:			13:15

== Personnel ==
- Lou Gramm – vocals; producer
- Eddie Martinez – lead guitar
- Bruce Turgon – rhythm guitars
- Stanley Sheldon – bass guitar
- Phil Ashley – keyboards, programming
- Ben Gramm – drums
- Mark Rivera – backing vocals
- Sherryl Marshall – backing vocals
- Cookie Watkins – backing vocals

=== Technical personnel ===
- Pat Moran – producer, engineer
- Ted Jensen – mastering engineer (at Sterling Sound, New York)
- Timothy White – cover photography
- Bob Defrin – art direction

== Charts ==
=== Weekly charts ===
Chart (1987)	Peak position
Australia (Kent Music Report)	8
Canada Top Singles (RPM)	15
Germany (GfK)	45
Netherlands (Single Top 100)	29
New Zealand (Recorded Music NZ)	40
UK Singles (Official Charts)	82
US Billboard Hot 100	5
US Mainstream Rock (Billboard)	1

=== Year-end charts ===
Chart (1987)	Position
Australia (Kent Music Report)	51
US Top Pop Singles (Billboard)	82

== See also ==
- List of Billboard Mainstream Rock number-one songs of 1987
