= Ready or Not (Lou Gramm song) =

1987 single by Lou Gramm

Single by Lou Gramm

from the album Ready or Not
- Released: May 1987
- Recorded: 1986
- Genre: Rock
- Length: 3:25
- Songwriter(s): Lou Gramm; Bruce Turgon
- Producer(s): Lou Gramm; Pat Moran

Lou Gramm singles chronology
"Midnight Blue" (1987)	"Ready or Not" (1987)	"Just Between You and Me" (1989)

"Ready or Not" is a single by Lou Gramm from his debut solo album of the same name, Ready or Not, released in 1987.

Cash Box said that "Gramm is on firm ground with this new single that combines his urgent singing and punchy production."

== Chart positions ==
Chart (1987)	Peak position
US Billboard Hot 100	54
US Album Rock Tracks	7
