= Morpheus Rising =

British heavy metal rock band

- Origin: York, England
- Genres: Rock, heavy metal, NWOBHM
- Years active: 2008-present
- Label: Melodic Revolution Records
- Members: Si Wright; Pete Harwood; Mikey Walsh; Andy Smith; Ian Wright
- Past members: Paul 'Gibbo' Gibbons; Grae Tennick; Damien James Sweeting; Nigel Durham
- Website: http://www.morpheusrising.co.uk/

Morpheus Rising is a British rock band formed in 2008, producing music which is influenced heavily by the NWOBHM style of rock dominated by bands such as Iron Maiden, Saxon and UFO. The band also draw heavily from the style of bands such as Thin Lizzy, making use of twin guitar harmony parts throughout their compositions. The first album, Let The Sleeper Awake was released at the end of 2011.

== History ==
=== Early years ===
Formed by Pete Harwood (formerly of Vixen) in April 2008 when Grae Tennick answered an online advert. Within weeks the two had written six tracks and were working on more. Additional members of the band were quickly lined up with Andy Smith (of Mostly Autumn) on bass guitar and Paul 'Gibbo' Gibbons (previously of The Bogus Brothers) on drums. A second guitarist, essential for the type of music the band were writing, proved harder to find with Rhys McPherson and Phil O'dea taking part in early rehearsals before Damien James Sweeting was recommended to the band by a mutual friend. Arriving at the studio knowing all five songs from the demo CD, Sweeting's audition quickly became the first rehearsal of what would be the band's first lineup.

2010 saw the band embark on their first UK tour. Mixing a handful of support dates for The Reasoning on their Adverse Camber tour with several headline dates of their own, including a second bill slot on the inaugural Forces Festival in Bulford, England. Additional dates included another support for Gun and more headline performances before the band were forced into hiatus while Grae deployed on operations in Afghanistan from August 2010 until February 2011.

After his return from Afghanistan, Grae announced that he would be leaving Morpheus Rising due to both work and family commitments. Two final performances were fulfilled prior to his departure, a return to the Forces Festival (this time supporting blues guitarist Gwyn Ashton) and a farewell gig at Fibbers in York. Despite having begun work on their debut album (already postponed for Grae's operational tour) this was delayed further until a replacement vocalist could be found.

=== New lineup ===
Morpheus Rising announced Grae's replacement, Si Wright (of Burnwylde), at his farewell gig. The band had already confirmed a slot at the Cambridge Rock Festival, just six weeks away, and began rehearsing in earnest. Following a warm up show in York, Wright was in thrown in at the deep end at the Classic Rock Society sponsored Stage 2 of the Cambridge Rock Festival, on 5 August 2011. The debut album, Let The Sleeper Awake, was released on 9 December 2011 with a supporting tour in January 2012.

Following a relatively quiet year in 2012, 2013 saw the band touring with Panic Room across the UK, with guitarist Pete Harwood playing with both bands, standing in at Panic Room following the departure of guitarist Paul Davies. By this point, original drummer Paul Gibbons had departed, the band and was temporarily replaced by Henry Rogers of DeeExpus and Touchstone while a full-time replacement was sought.

=== New record label and drummer ===
In August 2013, shortly after the tour, Morpheus Rising signed with Melodic Revolution Records in Florida, US, and announced that former Saxon and Oliver/Dawson Saxon drummer, Nigel Durham was to join the band, completing the line up for the forthcoming second album.

== Musical style ==
Referring to their style as NWoBHM-TNG (New Wave of British Heavy Metal - The Next Generation) Morpheus Rising's musical style incorporates the fast upbeat tempos, power chords, fast guitar solos and melodic, soaring vocals recognised as core elements of the style made famous in the 1980s. In addition, the band have continued the tradition of lyrical themes which draw inspiration from mythology and fantasy fiction themes.

Primarily written by Pete Harwood the music also draws on the melodic twin guitar harmonies made famous by Thin Lizzy. The pairing of Harwood/Sweeting has been likened to the guitar duo of Adrian Smith and Dave Murray of Iron Maiden on more than one occasion and BBC Music Introducing presenter, Matt Seymour, stated the two were the 'tightest guitar duo ever to appear on the show'.

Lyrically, both Grae Tennick and Si Wright have used science fiction, horror and fantasy literature and movies as catalysts for their inspiration. 30 Days of Night, Lords of the North, Night of the Living Dead and Dorian Gray have all played their part in inspiring the lyricists.

== Current members ==
- Si Wright - Lead and Backing Vocals (2011–present)
- Pete Harwood - Lead and Rhythm Guitar (2008–present)
- Mikey Walsh - Lead and Rhythm Guitar (2017–present)
- Andy Smith - Bass Guitar (2008–present)
- Ian Wright - Drums (2017–present)

== Former members ==
- Grae Tennick - Lead and Backing Vocals (2008-2011)
- Paul 'Gibbo' Gibbons - Drums, Backing Vocals (2008–2013)
- Damien James Sweeting - Lead and Rhythm Guitar (2008–2015)
- Nigel Durham - Drums (2013–2016)

== Discography ==
=== Albums ===
- Let The Sleeper Awake (2011)
- Eximius Humanus (2014) Melodic Revolution Records
