= Sun King Rising =

John Blangero
- Also known as: Sun King Rising
- Genres: Blues, Southern Rock, Soul
- Labels: PeacockSunrise Records
- Website: sunkingrising.com

Sun King Rising is a professional moniker/alter ego of an American geneticist and biomedical research scientist, John Blangero for his music albums. The project was founded in 2018 and has released two albums, Delta Tales and Signs & Wonders, under the record label of PeacockSunrise Records.

== Overview ==
At age five, John Blangero began taking piano lessons in New Castle, Pennsylvania and developed an interest in music. After five years, he learned the fundamentals of western classical, gospel, and rock music.

Blangero then joined a rock band at his school when he was fourteen. Later he co-founded his band Harlequin as his regional popularity amplified in Pittsburgh, Pennsylvania.

He continued with the band Harlequin until he joined college and focused mainly on his studies. In 1986, he earned his PhD and became a biomedical research scientist.

In the 2000s, Blangero started playing live for blues bands in San Antonio, Texas. In 2018, he launched his professional moniker Sun King Rising. In 2019, Nick Katana after rebranding his music company Melodic Revolution Records to PeacockSunshine Records, signed Blangero for Sun King Rising.

In 2020, Blangero hired Steven "Ace" Acker, a member of a 1970s band named LAW, to produce his first album Delta Tales, which was released on October 2, 2020. In the same year, he released an independent video song Free Will in China Blues.

On October 1, 2022, Sun King Rising released another album, Signs & Wonders.

=== Discography ===
Year	Album	Song
2022	Sign and Wonders	No. 6 Magnolia Avenue
2022	Sign and Wonders	Bitter Water Sweetened
2022	Sign and Wonders	One More Story
2022	Sign and Wonders	Jubal Takes a Wife
2022	Sign and Wonders	Low Wine and Cruel Ruin
2022	Sign and Wonders	Lanterns on the Levee
2022	Sign and Wonders	Buried in the Blues
2022	Sign and Wonders	Anchorless
2022	Sign and Wonders	Alabama Nocturne
2022	Sign and Wonders	She was a Blonde
2020	Free Will in China Blue	Free Will in China Blue
2020	Delta Tales	The Snake
2020	Delta Tales	Milkweed and Thistle
2020	Delta Tales	Down The Delta Road
2020	Delta Tales	In a State of Grace
2020	Delta Tales	Take It Down
2020	Delta Tales	Beneath The Southern Sun
2020	Delta Tales	Evangeline in The Morning
2020	Delta Tales	Love Turns Grey
2020	Delta Tales	Drive Me To Nashville
2020	Delta Tales	Let There Be Light
