= Aisles =

Chilean progressive rock band

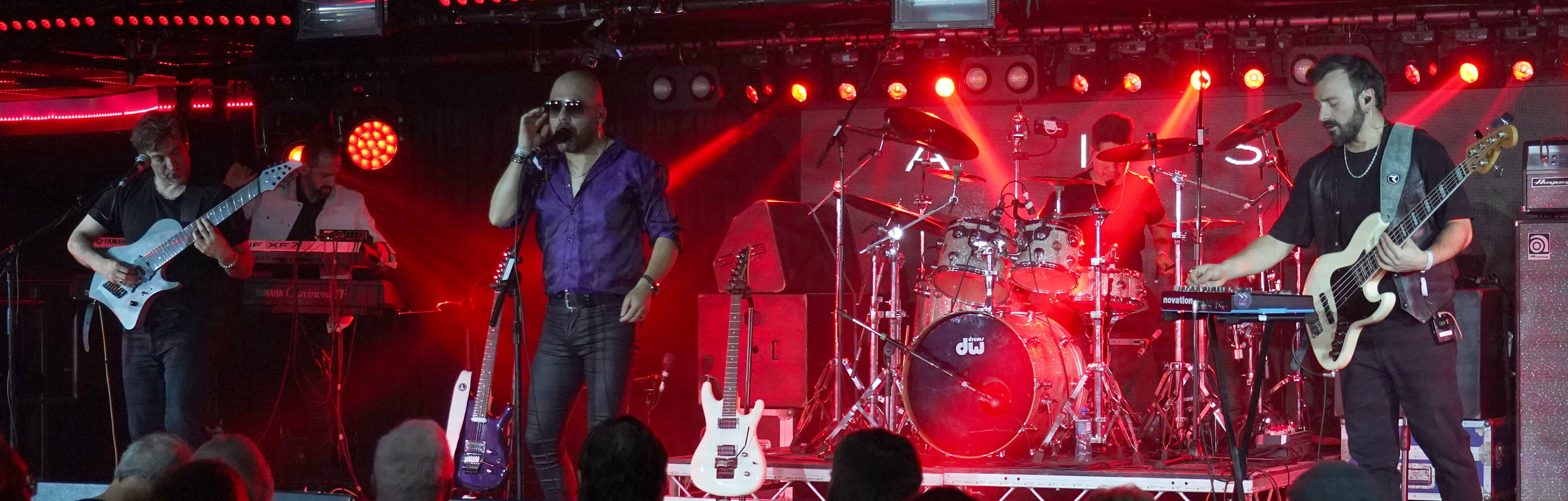
- Aisles in 2025

Background information
- Origin: Santiago, Chile
- Genres: Progressive rock, art rock, fusion
- Years active: 2004–present
- Labels: Presagio Records, Musea, Mylodon, Melodic Revolution,
- Members: Israel Gil; Germán Vergara; Rodrigo Sepúlveda; Juan Pablo Gaete; Felipe Candia; Daniel Alejandro Concha Baird-Kerr
- Past members: Sebastián Vergara; Felipe González; Luis Vergara; Alejandro Meléndez; Juan Carlos Raglianti
- Website: www.aislesproject.com

Aisles is a six-piece Chilean progressive rock band originally from Santiago, Chile.

The band combines elements of rock, progressive rock, fusion, and Latin music, among others. Aisles has toured in South America, North America and Europe, participating in several Prog-rock festivals. The band's albums have been released in Europe, the United States, Japan. In 2009, the band was nominated for "Best Foreign Record" by the Prog Awards for their second album, In Sudden Walks.

Aisles' third album, 4:45 AM, was released October 29, 2013, on Presagio Records. The band released their fourth record, Hawaii, on July 29, 2016.

== History ==
=== Formation, The Yearning (2001–2005) ===
Aisles was founded in 2001 by Germán Vergara (guitar, vocals), his brother Luis (keyboards), and their childhood friend Rodrigo Sepúlveda (guitar, vocals). In 2002, Alejandro Meléndez, hailing from Brazil, joined the band. Initially seeking lead singers, the band invited Germán and Luis' younger brother, Sebastián, to record a demo for auditioning purposes. However, upon discovering his impressive vocal abilities, they asked him to become their permanent vocalist, thus completing the band's initial lineup.

After a period of playing gigs at local clubs and bars, the band entered the studio in 2003 with the purpose of recording its first professional-level demo for promotional purposes. However, the band was well-satisfied with the quality of sound and musical performances and decided to release this effort as their first full-length album. The Yearning (2005) was mixed and mastered over a span of ten weeks, and was subsequently released and distributed in South America, Europe, the United States, and Japan, receiving generally positive reviews by specialized press. Françoise Couture of Allmusic wrote "The Yearning, Chilean band Aisles' first calling card, is a convincing disc of South American-flavored neo-progressive rock. Nothing gets reinvented. But the lads clearly know what they are doing." Additionally, Conor Fines of Prog Sphere stated "based on its own merits, Aisles' The Yearning is a very good debut. Melody, strong songwriting, admirable performances, and enough details in the music to be worth going back to quite a few times makes the album an unlikely winner."

=== Touring, In Sudden Walks (2006–2011) ===
After the release of its debut album, the band spent most of 2006 touring in the local circuit, playing in venues such as House of Rock, Subterráneo, and several theaters across the country. In 2006, Felipe González joined the band to play bass during live performances, and in late 2007, Felipe Candia joined the band on drums to start rehearsals for Aisles' second album.

The works for the band's second album extended for over a year. This time, the group took a darker, more visual approach, mixing elements of music and drama, as shown in the opening track, "Mariachi." The broadening sound, including genres such as Latin music, and the high sound quality and production made many consider the album a leap forward. In Sudden Walks was self-produced and released in January 2009. Once again, the album was well-received by fans and critics. Cesar Inca of Prog Archives said, "In Sudden Walks may have been one of the five most accomplished neo-prog albums of 2009. It is a lovely collection of inventive compositions and bold arrangements", while David Dashifen Kees of USA Progressive Music stated "From moment one, the album reveals a unique composition of sounds which display an understanding of music and a depth of theme and creativity that many other bands lack."

In August 2009, Aisles was the only South American band invited to participate in the Crescendo Prog Rock festival in Saint-Palais Sur Mer, France, and was later nominated for the Prog Awards in the Best Foreign Record category in Italy. After touring Europe, the band spent the rest of 2010 playing in its home country, in venues such as Sala SCD, Sala Master, Teatro Nemesio Antúnez, and Café del Teatro. In late 2010, keyboardist Luis Vergara left the band due to musical differences.

=== 4:45 AM (2011–2014) ===
In the second half of 2011, Daniel Baird-Kerr joined the band as a full-time bassist to start rehearsals for the band's upcoming album. With a new line up, and a strong desire to internationalize their career, Aisles started working on their third album.

4:45 AM was recorded in several studios in Santiago between July 2012 and August 2013, with production duties taken by guitarist Germán Vergara. The album had a greater emphasis on visual aesthetics, taking elements from drama and other art forms. 4:45 AM was released in October 2013 through Presagio Records. The album was critically acclaimed; Brian McKinnon of Prog Rock Music Talk said: "4:45 AM is nothing short of a masterwork of art. It is the reason people fall in love with music in the first place. An astounding piece of work for the ages". Breakout, one of Germany's most long-established rock magazines, chose "4:45 AM" as one of the best albums of the month. The album was released at a show on 22 October 2014, at Teatro Ladrón de Bicicletas, in Santiago de Chile. The title track appeared on a cover-mounted CD on the front of Prog magazine in the UK, thereby introducing UK audiences to the band for the first time. A couple of months before this shows, keyboardist Alejandro Meléndez left, and was replaced by his friend Juan Pablo Gaete.

=== Hawaii (2015–2022) ===
In July 2015, the band started writing songs for their upcoming new album at a beach house, where they stayed for a week. The recording sessions took place in November 2015, for ten days, at the prestigious Estudio del Sur, in Maria Pinto, 54 km west of the Chilean capital.

Hawaii is a two-disc concept album about human colonies established in space after the destruction of the Earth. Its twelve tracks explore the dilemmas and challenges that the individual and the human spirit would face in this futuristic scenario. The album was praised by the critics; it was chosen by Chilean premiere rock magazine as album of the year.

The band toured Europe for the first time in their career in October 2016, following a release show at Cine Arte Alameda in Santiago. Aisles played in the Netherlands, France, Belgium and England.

In September 2020 the band introduced their new singer, Israel Gil, and are currently working on their fifth studio album, to be released in 2021.

=== Beyond Drama (2023–present) ===
On 5 April 2023 the band released their latest album Beyond Drama.

== Discography ==
- The Yearning (2005)
- In Sudden Walks (2009)
- 4:45 AM (2013)
- Hawaii (2016)
- Live from Estudio del Sur EP (2018)
- Beyond Drama (2023)

== Musical style ==
Over the course of its career, Aisles has experimented with elements from a variety of genres and styles, including progressive rock, neo-prog, symphonic rock, art rock, classical and Latin music. The band has often been praised by its eclecticism, lyrical content and musical execution.

== Band members ==
Current members

- Israel Gil – lead vocals (2020–present)
- Germán Vergara – guitars, vocals, keyboards (2001–present)
- Felipe Candia – drums, percussion (2007-2009, 2010–present)
- Rodrigo Sepúlveda – guitars, vocals (2001–present)
- Juan Pablo Gaete – keyboards (2014–present)
- Daniel Alejandro Concha Baird-Kerr – bass (2013–present)

Former members

- Sebastián Vergara – lead vocals (2002–2018)
- Luis Vergara – keyboards (2001–2010)
- Felipe González – bass (2005–2010)
- Alejandro Meléndez – keyboards (2002–2014)
- Marco Prado – drums, percussion (2005–2006)
- Juan Carlos Raglianti – drums, percussion (2009–2010)
