= Ready or Not (Lou Gramm album) =

Studio album by Lou Gramm
- Released: January 29, 1987
- Recorded: November 1986
- Studios: Bear Tracks, Suffern; The Hit Factory, NYC
- Length: 40:39
- Label: Atlantic
- Producers: Pat Moran; Lou Gramm

Lou Gramm chronology
| Ready or Not (1987) | Long Hard Look (1989) |

Singles from Ready or Not
- 1. "Midnight Blue" Released: February 1987; 2. "Ready or Not" Released: May 1987

Ready or Not is the solo debut studio album by American rock singer-songwriter Lou Gramm, released on January 29, 1987, through Atlantic.

== Production ==
Eight of the ten songs, which comprise Ready or Not, were written by Gramm in partnership with former Black Sheep bandmate Bruce Turgon.

The album was recorded in November 1986 at Bear Tracks Recording in Suffern, New York and The Hit Factory Recording in New York City.

It was produced by Gramm and Pat Moran, who is known as an engineer on recordings by such performers as Rush and Robert Plant.

== Reception ==
Professional ratings
Review scores
| Source | Rating |
|---|---|
| AllMusic | 4.5/5 stars |

Ready or Not was a commercial success, reaching number 27 on the US Billboard 200. It generated two hit songs. The lead-off single, "Midnight Blue", peaked at number 5 on the Billboard Hot 100 and climbed to the top of the Mainstream Rock chart. It has been Gramm's only song to have charted in the United Kingdom. The second single from the album was the title song, which reached number 54 on the Billboard Hot 100 and number 7 on the Mainstream Rock chart.

The album has enjoyed critical acclaim. Bret Adams of AllMusic described it as "rich with melody and snap".

== Track listing ==
All tracks are written by Lou Gramm and Bruce Turgon, except "She's Got to Know" and "Lover Come Back" written by Gramm.

Side one
| No. | Title | Length |
|---|---|---|
| 1. | "Ready or Not" | 3:29 |
| 2. | "Heartache" | 4:29 |
| 3. | "Midnight Blue" | 3:58 |
| 4. | "Time" | 3:23 |
| 5. | "If I Don't Have You" | 4:39 |

Side two
| No. | Title | Length |
|---|---|---|
| 6. | "She's Got to Know" | 4:02 |
| 7. | "Arrow thru Your Heart" | 3:47 |
| 8. | "Until I Make You Mine" | 3:31 |
| 9. | "Chain of Love" | 4:02 |
| 10. | "Lover Come Back" | 5:19 |
| Total length: | | 40:39 |

== Personnel ==
- Lou Gramm – vocals, percussion
- Philip Ashley – keyboards, programming
- Bruce Turgon – bass guitar, rhythm guitar (track 2), lead guitar (track 10)
- Nils Lofgren – lead guitar
- Ben Gramm – drums

=== Additional musicians ===
- Richard Grammatico – lead guitar (on "If I Don't Have You"), additional guitar (on "Time")
- Don Mancuso – additional guitar (on "Chain of Love")
- Eddie Martinez – additional guitar (tracks 1, 2 and "Chain of Love")
- Stanley Sheldon – bass guitar (track 2 and "If I Don't Have You")
- Mark Rivera – soprano saxophone (track 10), tenor saxophone, backing vocals
- Crispin Cioe – baritone saxophone, tenor saxophone
- Ben Grammatico Sr. – lead trumpet
- Ben Grammatico Jr. – trumpet
- Sherryl Marshall – backing vocals
- Cookie Watkins – backing vocals

== Production ==
- Lou Gramm – producer
- Pat Moran – producer, engineer
- Ted Jensen – mastering at Sterling Sound (New York, NY).
- Timothy White – cover photography
- Bob Defrin – art direction, design

== Charts ==
=== Weekly charts ===
| Chart (1987) | Peak position |
|---|---|
| Australian Albums (Kent Music Report) | 34 |
| Canada Top Albums/CDs (RPM) | 24 |
| Dutch Albums (Album Top 100) | 66 |
| Swedish Albums (Sverigetopplistan) | 14 |
| Swiss Albums (Schweizer Hitparade) | 28 |
| US Billboard 200 | 27 |

=== Year-end charts ===
| Chart (1987) | Peak position |
|---|---|
| US Billboard 200 | 99 |

== Certifications ==
| Region | Certification | Certified units/sales |
|---|---|---|
| Canada (Music Canada) | Gold | 50,000^{^} |
^{^} Shipments figures based on certification alone.
