= Colin Tench =

English rock musician

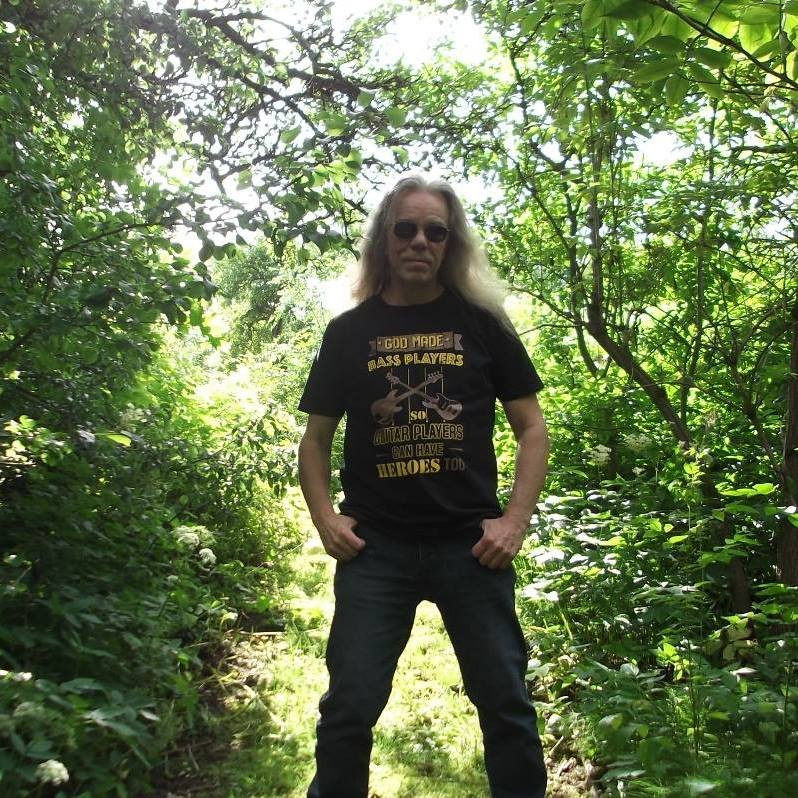

Background information
- Birth name: Colin Tench
- Born: 30 May 1954 England
- Died: 27 December 2017 (aged 63) Sweden
- Genres: Rock
- Occupations: Musician; Songwriter; Producer
- Instruments: Guitar; Keyboards
- Years active: 1976–2017
- Labels: Melodic Revolution Records; Waters

Colin Tench (30 May 1954 – 27 December 2017) was an English guitarist, songwriter and producer. After being with Odin of London for some years in the late 70s and early 80s, he founded BunChakeze, who recorded a progressive rock album. Because that genre was not commercially interesting at the time, no record label could be found to release it. In 2010, after not playing in any bands for 25 years, encouraged by friends he met on the internet, Colin released the BunChakeze album. The album was received very well, and led him into releasing a string of albums with his own projects, of which Corvus Stone and Colin Tench Project were most important, and as a guest musician for other acts. He also produced albums for these same other acts, building him a cult following around the world. Colin died unexpectedly of natural causes on 27 December 2017, 3 days after the release of his second album with the Colin Tench Project.

== Career ==
=== Australia and Odin of London ===
At the age of 22*, Tench left England to live in Sydney, Australia for three years. During his stay, he decided to take up playing the guitar. Together with other English expats and sons of expats, he formed The Pommie Gentlemen. The group played local clubs and joined Battle of the Bands contests, but by Tench's own admission, they were not particularly very good. At one gig, however, he spotted legendary AC/DC vocalist Bon Scott in the audience and afterwards spoke briefly with him, Scott reportedly saying that he thought the band was alright.

After leaving Australia, Tench forgot about guitar playing and returned home to London via a journey of several months through Asia. Originally he had no aspirations to continue playing the guitar, but then he decided to audition for a new band named Odin of London. At the time of the auditions, former Black Widow and Cressida guitarist John Culley had also tried out for the band. According to bassist Gary Derrick, Tench called every day to ask if he had passed the audition. Someone suggested having two lead guitarists, and both Tench and Culley were hired. The band was born in 1981 and was composed of Gary Derrick (bass), Derek Sanderson (keyboards), John Culley (guitars), Colin Tench (guitars), and Cliff Deighton (drums). Carl Lucas was hired to replace the former vocalist, and Anne Tench designed the artwork for the band's poster.

Odin of London recorded several original songs at a studio belonging to Alex Foulcher, with one song, "Catherine", featuring Tench on vocals. Their song "Alcatraz" was chosen to be included on a compilation LP, but the company desired a different vocalist. Tench discovered Tony Butler, and the song was rerecorded with Butler's vocals. The contract with the label, however, did not favour the band and they declined to permit the use of their song. Odin of London sent out their recordings on cassette to record companies but were repeatedly rejected. In 1984, the band simply stopped doing anything and three members decided to start a new project.

=== BunChakeze ===
Tench, Derrick, and Deighton formed a new band in 1984. One of the first compositions, a short instrumental piece with many key changes, was brought forward by Tench. When asked by his band members about the composition, he allegedly replied that it was a "bunch of keys". This led to the band being named BunChakeze, a rough homophone of "bunch of keys". The trio began writing new music but needed a place to record. The band turned to Alex Foulcer at whose studio they had recorded Odin of London's tracks. Foulcer was building a new studio and, according to Tench, a deal was made over a card game one night; the three musicians would help build the studio during the day in exchange for recording time at night. Between 1984 and 1985, the studio and BunChakeze's songs came together.

With an album's worth of music ready, the band decided to audition a singer. After a few months, American singer Joey Lugassy from Los Angeles arrived in London on his first visit to the United Kingdom and advertised that he was looking for a band. He was called to meet with BunChakeze and was hired to sing the songs, a challenge for him as the music had already been recorded and he had to make his vocals fit the music. With the album Whose Dream completed at last, the band was satisfied with the results, the purpose having been to record an album of music on their own terms. A few record companies were contacted but no one expected any positive results and none came. At last, the band split up, and Tench once more took to traveling.

The band reformed once in 1992, remixed their recordings, and once more attempted to garner record label interest. However, after a few more rejections the members each went their separate ways once more.

=== Corvus Stone ===
In 2009*, Tench moved into a house in Avesta, Sweden and decided to contact his old Odin of London bandmate, John Culley. Not knowing where to find him, Tench looked up Black Widow's web site and contacted the site manager, a Finnish keyboard player and composer named Pasi Koivu. Tench told Koivu about the Odin of London and BunChakeze recordings and Koivu asked to hear them. Impressed, he encouraged Tench to release both albums. Odin of London's recordings were released as a digital download only and BunChakeze was released digitally and on CD in 2010. Via chatrooms and Facebook, he began acquainting himself with a number of artists who would soon play important roles in his recording career, including American multi-instrumentalist and singer Blake Carpenter, British singer/songwriter Andy John Bradford, Belgian singer and guitarist Stef Flaming, Argentinian composer Andres Guazzelli, and illustrating artist Sonia Mota of Mozambique.

In 2011, Koivu asked Tench if he would play on a piece he had written called "Iron Pillows". Tench had not played guitar since 1985 and found the piece very challenging but agreed to collaborate. The music attracted the attention of Finnish bass player, Petri Lindstrom who contributed to the recording. A year later, Koivu presented Tench and Lindstrom with a piece titled "The Ice King". This was followed by "Corvus Stone". The trio were now committed to writing music together, and at the suggestion of Sonia Mota, the new band was named Corvus Stone. By now it seemed possible that an album would result from their efforts. Before they completed the recordings, they were contacted by American drummer Robert Wolff who expressed interest in joining the band, and Corvus Stone became a four-piece. Stef Flaming wrote the music for "Jussi Pussi", a whimsical piece named after a type of Finnish bread roll. Though most of the tracks were intended to be instrumental, Blake Carpenter sang on a couple of tracks. John Culley made a guest appearance on the song "You're So Wrong", a cover of an old Black Widow song he had played on. He was joined by drummer Victor Tassone of the progressive metal band Unified Past. The album was released through Melodic Revolution Records on 26 November 2012.

While recording Corvus Stone, Tench was asked by Carpenter to play lead guitar for his band project The Minstrel's Ghost's second album, Road to Avalon. The album tells the story of King Arthur and was released on 7 December 2012. Tench was also approached by Andy John Bradford to play guitar for his band Oceans 5. He and Bradford enlisted the assistance of a few musicians with whom Tench was acquainted, such as Andres Guazzelli, Stef Flaming, Victor Tassone, and Italian keyboard player, Marco Chiappini. The newly formed band began reworking the old folk song "Return to Mingulay". Tench, however, was not satisfied with the mixing and set about learning how to mix albums. It was during this time he learned about dynamic range and how much of modern music is compressed to a low dynamic range level. He took pride in mixing all his music projects with a high dynamic range. Oceans 5 released their album Return to Mingulay on 7 October 2013 through Melodic Revolution Records. The song "6000 Friends" features a guest appearance by vocalist Lorelei McBroom of the Australian Pink Floyd band.

Argentinian composer and musician Andres Guazzelli asked Tench to play lead guitar for his twelve-minute instrumental piece, "Wish You Could Hear". The track was released on 2 November 2013 by Melodic Revolution Records. Tench commented saying that it was the most challenging piece that he had ever played on.

=== Corvus Stone II, unscrewed, side projects and guest appearances ===
Having become accomplished at mixing and mastering music, Tench was asked by Stef and Yolanda Flaming of the Belgian band Murky Red to mix their debut album, Time Doesn't Matter. He also contributed lead guitar for the track "Heal My Bleeding Heart". His collaboration with the Flamings continued as Corvus Stone began recording material for a second album. They chose to cover the Murky Red song "Boots for Hire" and asked Stef Flaming to sing on the track. As the album came together, several musicians were either approached by Tench to perform on the album or the artists themselves asked to be a part of the music. Special guests for Corvus Stone II included Andres Guazzelli, Blake Carpenter, German Vergara, Phil Naro, Sean Filkins, and Timo Rautiainen all doing vocals for different songs. Victor Tassone added percussion and also drums for the track "The Simple Life". The album was released 30 September 2014.

In 2015, Tench proposed remixing a selection of songs from the first Corvus Stone album. The remixes and four new tracks were released as a digital download album on 28 July.

By this time, Tench had become known to many musicians and was asked to play on various tracks or be a part of band projects. He joined Stef Flaming and John Moulder in a new project called Transmission Rails. The trio recorded two songs together. In 2016, he also guested on German progressive rock band KariBow's Holophinium album, Italian psychedelic/progressive rock artist Marco Ragni's album Land of Blue Echoes, and French progressive rock band Grandval's album A Ciel Ouvert.... Tench was also approached by Mark Trueack of the multi-national progressive rock artist collaboration United Progressive Fraternity to perform on the debut album, Fall In Love With the World, which also included contributions by legendary progressive rock artists Jon Anderson and Steve Hackett. Composer and multi-instrumentalist Steve Gresswell asked Tench to play lead guitar for his band project Coalition's second album, Bridge Across Time. The album was released 7 October 2016 and features Blake Carpenter on vocals.

=== Colin Tench Project ===
After a flurry of activity in the first half of 2016, Tench turned his attention to a personal project which he had begun back in 2011 and had been working on little by little. Unfinished pieces and early versions of ideas in the works had been uploaded to the ReverbNation music-sharing site under the name Colin Tench Project, but now at last these works became the focus of his attention. Over the next few months, Tench contacted several musicians to ask if they would be interested in participating in the project. Joining the project was Corvus Stone bassist, Petri Lindstrom, and vocalist Phil Naro, who had previously sung on Corvus Stone tracks. Other names included drummer Vic Tassone and bassist Stephen Speelman of the American progressive metal band, Unified Past, composer Steve Gresswell, flutist Ian Beabout, and German melodic progressive rock band, KariBow's Oliver Rusing, who played drums for one track.

Tench was always pleased to announce new members to the project, first with tease posts on his Facebook page and finally the official announcement. One very important person to join the project was the multi-talented Peter Jones who was the sole member of the English progressive rock project, Tiger Moth Tales. Jones had only just recently been asked by legendary prog rock band, Camel, to join them on tour as a keyboard player. Tench was deeply impressed with Jones' ability to understand what Tench was aiming for, and he often stated that, "Pete just gets it!" In addition to vocals, Jones also played a clarinet solo in the song "And So Today", which also became the lead single release.

As Tench continued to tease his fans with new music, one piece titled "The Sad Brazilian" caught the interest of American guitarist and orchestral composer, Gordo Bennett. Bennett knew Tench through their work on the United Progressive Fraternity album, and when "The Sad Brazilian" was posted on YouTube, an inspired Bennett downloaded the music and added his own orchestration to it, then contacted Tench with an apology for stealing the music and a request to listen to Bennett's additional orchestration. Tench loved it and welcomed Bennett to the project. The timing was most fortuitous as orchestral composer, Steve Gresswell was becoming busy with his Coalition band project. Bennett was able to take over and provide the orchestral music for the rest of the album.

The Colin Tench Project album Hair In A G-String (unfinished but sweet) was released on 30 September 2016. The title was a humorous play on the title "Air On A G String" and the commonly used appended title "Unfinished Suite". The album was based on the multi-part hair In A G-String suite, several instrumental compositions including three acoustic guitar tracks and two re-workings of a Corvus Stone theme, and a few melodic songs in a more classic rock feel.

The album quickly captured one of the top positions on the ProgArchives web site and received praise from reviewers around the world, who noted the successful blend of contributions from so many musicians. Music web sites and music magazines rated the album highly. Tench was pleased to receive so much praise but always stressed that the reason for the success of the music was due to the efforts of every single member in the project. Minstrel's Ghost, and Oceans 5

Before the summer of 2017, Tench began working on ideas for a follow up album. The project was temporarily put on the back burner as he turned to some important renovations on his home, but by the end of the summer, new music teasers were being dropped into his Facebook timeline. This time the cast of participating musicians was trimmed back to a core group consisting of vocalists Peter Jones and Joey Lugassy, who had sung on the BunChakeze album back in 1985, Petri Lindstrom on bass, Gordo Bennett for orchestral arrangements, and drummer Joe Vitale of the Joe Walsh group. Additional guests were limited to Eddie Young on cello and Christo Pellani on drums and percussion. Running time wise, the album was shorter, coming to just around 54 minutes in comparison to Hair In A G-String which had not only nearly filled up the entire CD but also included as a bonus track with the digital download a composition credited entirely to Gordo Bennett. Another noticeable difference between the two albums were some more sombre tracks on the first "side" of the album. Variety, however, pervaded the new release, which was titled "minor Masterpiece". The digital download became available on 25 December 2017 and the CD was released on 30 January 2018.

== Discography ==
=== Recordings from the 1980s ===
- BunChakeze – Whose Dream? (12 December 1010)
- Odin of London – The London Tapes (2011)

=== With Corvus Stone ===
- Corvus Stone – Corvus Stone (26 November 2012) Melodic Revolution Records
- Corvus Stone – Corvus Stone II (30 September 2014) Melodic Revolution Records
- Corvus Stone – Corvus Stone Unscrewed (28 July 2015) (Self Released)

=== With The Minstrel's Ghost ===
- The Minstrel's Ghost – The Road To Avalon (12 December 2012) Melodic Revolution Records

=== With Andy John Bradford's Oceans 5 ===
- Andy John Bradford's Oceans 5 – Return to Mingulay (7 October 2013) Melodic Revolution Records

=== With Colin Tench Project ===
- Colin Tench Project – Hair in a G String (Unfinished but Sweet) (30 September 2016)
- Colin Tench Project – minor Masterpiece (24 December 2017)

=== As a guest on other acts ===
- Andres Guazzelli – Wish You Could Hear (2 November 2013) Melodic Revolution Records
- Murky Red – No Pocus Without Hocus (26 December 2015) Melodic Revolution Records
- Murky Red – Time Doesn't Matter (27 November 2016) Melodic Revolution Records
- Coalition – Bridge Across Time (7 October 2016)
- Karibow – Holophinium – Progressive Promotion Records (26 March 2016)
- Marco Ragni – Land Of Blue Echoes (21 March 2016) Melodic Revolution Records
- Grandval - A ciel ouvert... (5 September 2016)
- Andres Guazzelli – Awakening (in memory of Colin Tench) (posthumously) (20 August 2021) Melodic Revolution Records
