= Black Sheep (rock band) =

American rock band

- Origin: Rochester, New York, United States
- Genres: Hard rock
- Years active: 1974–1976
- Past members: Lou Gramm; Donald Mancuso; Larry Crozier; Bruce Turgon; Ron Rocco; Patsy Sciortino; Mike Bonafede

Black Sheep was an American, Rochester, New York-based, 1970s rock music band, one of vocalist Lou Gramm's early working bands (it followed Poor Heart, which broke up c. 1970). The group released the single "Stick Around" in 1974, the album Black Sheep in 1975, and the album Encouraging Words in late 1975. They were invited to open for Kiss on tour, but a truck accident destroyed their equipment. The band was no longer performing when Gramm was invited by Mick Jones to join the band Foreigner in 1976. Don Mancuso and Ron Rocco were later members of Cheater, a local hard rock band from Rochester that released a 10-inch record entitled Ten Cent Love Affair in 1980 on Mallard Records.

Black Sheep's bass player Bruce Turgon played on Lou Gramm's solo albums in the late 1980s (which also featured contributions from another Black Sheep alumnus, guitarist Don Mancuso) and joined Gramm in one of Foreigner's later incarnations, in 1992.

== Albums ==
=== "Black Sheep" (1975) - Capitol Records / Capitol ST-11369 ===
Side one

1. "Payin' Yer Dues" - (Lou Grammatico, Don Mancuso, Larry Crozier, Ron Rocco) - 4:08
2. "Broken Promises" - (Grammatico, Crozier, Bruce Turgon) - 3:20
3. "Woman Back Home" - (Grammatico, Turgon) - 3:20
4. "Piano Prelude" - (Crozier) - 1:04
5. "Let Me Stay" - (Grammatico, Turgon) - 7:15

Side two

6. "Power To Heal" - (Grammatico, Turgon) - 3:19
7. "Far Side Of The Sun" - (Grammatico, Mancuso, Rocco) - 6:56
8. "A Little Or A Lot" - (Grammatico, Mancuso, Turgon) - 3:34
9. "Freight Train" - (Grammatico, Mancuso, Rocco) - 3:00
10. "Woman" - (Paul Rodgers, Andy Fraser) - 8:19 - Cover of the sixth track of Free's self-titled second album

Personnel

- Lou Grammatico - vocals
- Don Mancuso - guitar
- Larry Crozier - keyboards
- Bruce Turgon - bass
- Ron Rocco - drums

=== "Encouraging Words" (1975) - Capitol Records / Capitol ST-11447 ===
Side one

1. "Halfway Home" - (Lou Grammatico, Bruce Turgon) - 4:19
2. "Encouraging Words" - (Grammatico, Don Mancuso, Turgon) - 5:27
3. "To Whom It May Concern" - (Grammatico, Larry Crozier) - 3:51
4. "No Worry, No Pain" - (Grammatico, Turgon) - 4:11
5. "When It All Makes Sense" - (Grammatico, Crozier) - 4:24

Side two

6. "The Change" - (Turgon) - 5:13
7. "All I Am" - (Turgon) - 3:35
8. "Shauna" - (Grammatico, Mancuso) - 3:44
9. "Chain On Me" - (Grammatico, Mancuso) - 4:21

Personnel

- Lou Grammatico - vocals
- Don Mancuso - guitar
- Larry Crozier - keyboards
- Bruce Turgon - bass
- Mike Bonafede - drums
