= Just Between You and Me (Lou Gramm song) =

1989 single by Lou Gramm

Single by Lou Gramm

from the album Long Hard Look
- B-side: "Tin Soldier"
- Released: October 1989
- Length: 4:56; 3:51 (single/video edit)
- Label: Atlantic
- Songwriters: Lou Gramm; Holly Knight
- Producers: Peter Wolf; Eric "E.T." Thorngren

Lou Gramm singles chronology
"Ready or Not" (1987)	"Just Between You and Me" (1989)	"True Blue Love" (1989)

"Just Between You and Me" is a single by American singer Lou Gramm from his second solo album Long Hard Look, released in 1989. It was a number-six hit in the United States and peaked at number two in Canada.

== Charts ==
=== Weekly charts ===
Chart (1989–1990)	Peak position
Australia (ARIA)	31
Belgium (Ultratop 50 Flanders)	40
Canada Top Singles (RPM)	2
Canada Adult Contemporary (RPM)	3
US Billboard Hot 100	6
US Adult Contemporary (Billboard)	4
US Mainstream Rock (Billboard)	4

=== Year-end charts ===
Chart (1990)	Position
Canada Top Singles (RPM)	30
Canada Adult Contemporary (RPM)	58
US Billboard Hot 100	57
US Adult Contemporary (Billboard)	32
US Album Rock Tracks (Billboard)	46
