= Melodic Revolution Records =

- Parent company: Melodic Revolution Records
- Founded: 2004
- Founder: Nick Katona
- Status: PeacockSunrise Records
- Genre: Progressive Rock, Melodic Hard Rock, Prog Metal
- Country of origin: U.S.
- Location: Winter Springs, Florida
- Official website: mrrmusic.com

Melodic Revolution Records (MRR) was formed in October 2004 by Nick Katona and his wife Jennifer. It began out as a music store in Clinton, NY selling compact discs, DVDs, Vinyl and memorabilia.

In October 2005, an art gallery was added to the shop, simply called "Revolution Gallery". In June 2006 the "Revolution Gallery" was expanded by an additional 400 square feet and became a live venue known as "Live at The Revolution" at night and "Revolution Gallery" by day. The Kevin Thompson Trio was the first to play this new site. This started a new tradition of a live performance from local artists such as Rocky Graziano, Ryan Miller, Dave Snediker and The Jellyfish, as well as National and International touring artists such as Bless the Fall, As Tall As Lions, Alesana, Flutter Effect & Reed Foehl to name a few.

In 2006 Nick created and launched the Clinton Art and Music Festival held in the Historic Village of Clinton, New York.

2006 also saw the launch of Melodic Revolution Records (MRR) as a new independent label. The first Artist to join that label's roster was California based Progressive Rock/AOR band Echos Landing for their debut release "Closer To You" and soon followed by Arizona solo artist Laurie Larson for her sophomore release "Aquila".

A year after Melodic Revolution Records was established it relocated to Orlando, Florida where it has grown from a roster of two artists to dozens of bands and artists. with close to a hundred releases. MRR is known mainly as a rock & progressive music label with artists from many countries, such as Aisles, Leon Alvarado, Amadeus Awad, Paul D'Adamo, Anuryzm, Backhand, Jim Crean, Andres Guazzelli, Darrel Treech- Birch, Corvus Stone, D Drive, Don Mancuso, Forever Twelve, Gekko Projekt, Kristoffer Gildenlöw, ifsounds, Joe Macre, Kinetic Element, Kracked Earth, Don Mancuso, Morpheus Rising, Murky Red, NeverWake, Odin's Court, Peter Matuchniak, Nth Ascension, Marco Ragni, Port Mahadia, Progland, The Room, Scarlet Hollow, Solstice Coil, Stratospheerius, Sunshine & Bullets, Sun King Rising, Time Horizon, Thoughts Factory, Transport Aerian, Unified Past, Vitriol, Wings Of Destiny, among others.

Melodic Revolution Records, in addition to other activities, as well maintains a progressive music-related social network and music news blog & website Power Of Prog. In January 2018 the label launched its own radio station Melodic Revolution Radio. January 2019 sees the launch of PeacockSunRise Records a spin-off of Melodic Revolution Records. 2020 ReZonatz the second internet music news blog is launched.

== See also ==
- List of record labels
