= Long Hard Look =

Studio album by Lou Gramm
- Released: October 16, 1989
- Recorded: 1988–1989
- Studios: 418 Studios (Westlake Village, CA): BearTracks Studios (Suffern, NY); Stray Dogs Recording Studio (Katonah, NY)
- Genre: Rock
- Length: 45:13
- Label: Atlantic
- Producers: Peter Wolf, Eric "ET" Thorngren

Lou Gramm chronology
Ready or Not (1987)	Long Hard Look (1989)	Released (2026)

Singles from Long Hard Look
- 1. "Just Between You and Me" Released: October 1989; 2. "True Blue Love" Released: 1990

Professional ratings
Review scores
Source	Rating
AllMusic	2/5 stars

Long Hard Look is the second solo album by original Foreigner lead vocalist Lou Gramm, released through Atlantic Records on October 16, 1989. It features the top-10 single "Just Between You and Me".

== Track listing ==
Side one
No.	Title	Writer(s)	Length
1.	"Angel with a Dirty Face"	Lou Gramm; Ina Wolf; Peter Wolf	5:14
2.	"Just Between You and Me"	Gramm; Holly Knight	4:56
3.	"Broken Dreams"	Gramm; I. Wolf; P. Wolf	5:54
4.	"True Blue Love"	Gramm; P. Wolf	4:58
5.	"I'll Come Running"	Gramm; Bruce Turgon	4:06

Side two
No.	Title	Writer(s)	Length
1.	"Hangin' on My Hip"	Gramm; Turgon	3:38
2.	"Warmest Rising Sun"	Gramm	5:11
3.	"Day One"	Gramm; Turgon; P. Wolf	3:17
4.	"I'll Know When It's Over"	Gramm; Turgon	4:35
5.	"Tin Soldier" (Small Faces cover)	Ronnie Lane; Steve Marriott	3:24
Total length:			45:13

== Charts ==
Chart (1990)	Peak position
Australia (ARIA Charts)	56
Sweden	47

== Production ==
- Arranged by Peter Wolf, Lou Gramm and Bruce Turgon.
- Produced by Peter Wolf, except "Tin Soldier" (produced by Peter Wolf and Eric "E.T." Thorngren).
- Recorded by Gonzalo Espinoza and Paul Ericksen, except bass on "Warmest Rising Sun" recorded bu Jules Bowen and Eric Thorngren.
- Additional recording assistance by Carlos Gollisher, Chris Bubacz and Doug Oberkircher.
- Mixed by Gonzalo Espinoza and Peter Wolf, except "I'll Know When It's Over" mixed by Paul Ericksen. Mixed at 418 Studios.
- Mastered by Stephen Marcussen at Precision Lacquer (Los Angeles, CA).
- Production Coordinator – Carlos Gollisher, assisted by Stephen Nider.
- Art Direction and Design – Bob Defrin
- Photography – Roy Volkmann
- Tracks 1 and 3 published by Stray Notes Music Inc./Colgems-EMI Music Inc./Petwolf Music/Kikiko Music. Track 2 published by Stray Notes Music Inc./Knighty Knight Music/Colgems-EMI Music Inc. Track 4 published by Stray Notes Music, Inc./Colgems-EMI Music Inc./Petwolf Music. Tracks 5, 6 and 9 published by Stray Notes Music Inc./Colgems-EMI Music Inc./Acara Music/WB Music Corp. Track 7 published by Stray Notes Music Inc./Colgems-EMI Music Inc. Track 8 published by Stray Notes Music Inc./Colgems-EMI Music/Acara Music/WB Music Corp./Petwolf Music. Track 10 published by United Artists Music Ltd./EMI Catalog Partnership (all rights for U.S. and Canada controlled by EMI Unart Catalog).

== Personnel ==
- Lou Gramm – vocals, percussion, backing vocals (1, 3, 6–8, 10)
- Peter Wolf – keyboards (1–5, 7–9), backing vocals (1, 8), additional keyboards (10)
- Gary Corbett – keyboards (10)
- Dann Huff – lead guitar (1, 5, 9), rhythm guitar (1, 9)
- Nils Lofgren – electric guitar (2, 8)
- Peter Maunu – electric guitar (2–4, 7)
- Vivian Campbell – electric guitar (3, 8), lead guitar (6), rhythm guitar (6)
- June Kuramoto – koto (7)
- Bruce Turgon – bass (2–6, 8–10), rhythm guitar (5, 6, 9, 10), backing vocals (6)
- Pino Palladino – bass (7)
- Ben Gramm – drums, percussion
- Maxi Anderson – backing vocals (3, 7)
- Merry Clayton – backing vocals (3, 7)
- Siedah Garrett – backing vocals (3, 7)
- Phillip Ingram – backing vocals (3, 7)
- Darryl Phinessee – backing vocals (3, 7)
- Ina Wolf – backing vocals (4)
- Reinhold Bilgeri – backing vocals (6)
- Robin Clark – backing vocals (10)
- Lani Groves – backing vocals (10)
