= Break It Up (Foreigner song) =

Single by Foreigner

from the album 4
- B-side: "Head Games (Live)"
- Released: April 1982
- Recorded: Early 1981
- Genre: Hard rock
- Length: 4:11 (album version); 3:25 (single version)
- Label: Atlantic
- Songwriter: Mick Jones
- Producers: Robert John "Mutt" Lange; Mick Jones

Foreigner singles chronology
"Waiting for a Girl Like You" (1981)	"Break It Up" (1982)	"Luanne" (1982)

"Break It Up" was the fourth single taken from the 1981 album 4 by the band Foreigner. The song was written by Mick Jones and the first to feature a B-side that was not available on one of their albums, a live version of their hit, "Head Games."

== Background ==
The song has a more melodic, slightly ballad-oriented sound mixed with their traditional hard rock. Rolling Stone contributor Kurt Loder described the song as a "classic cruncher."

Cash Box called it "another dose of bluster from the band that, along with Queen, virtually created pomp rock" but said that there is "nothing here that the band hasn’t done before," specifically comparing it to "Cold as Ice." Billboard described it as a "melodramatic mid tempo rocker forceful enough for the band's earliest AOR allies and melodic enough for pop formats." PopMatters critic Evan Sawdey said that it "tries so hard to recreate the ornate nature of 'Cold As Ice' but ends up turning into AM meat-rock."

Producer "Mutt" Lange wanted to use a click track for timing the drum part. Foreigner drummer Dennis Elliott got fed up about that so eventually he and Jones recorded the basic track themselves with Elliott on drums and Jones on piano. According to Jones "Then we turned round to ‘Mutt’ and said, ‘Okay? Happy now?!’ We wanted to prove the point that this band could play and keep time, too."

== Chart performance ==
"Break it Up" reached number 26 on the U.S. Billboard Hot 100.

== Cover versions ==
- Norwegian hard rock/heavy metal singer Jørn Lande has covered this song on his first album Starfire.
