= The Yearning (Aisles album) =

Studio album by Aisles
- Genre: Rock

The Yearning is the 2005 debut album by Chilean rock band Aisles.

== Track listing ==
All music is composed by Aisles

No.	Title	Lyrics	Length
1.	"The Wharf That Holds his Vessel"	G. Vergara, L. Vergara	11:20
2.	"Uncertain Lights"	G. Vergara	4:04
3.	"Clouds Motion"	Sepulveda, G. Vergara, L. Vergara, S. Vergara	7:06
4.	"The Rise of the White Sun"	L. Vergara	4:56
5.	"The Shrill Voice"	G. Vergara, L. Vergara	4:59
6.	"The Scarce Light Birth"	G. Vergara	7:40
7.	"Grey"	G. Vergara, L. Vergara	16:39
