= True Blue Love =

Single by Lou Gramm

from the album Long Hard Look
- B-side: "Tin Soldier"; "Warmest Rising Sun"
- Released: 1990
- Genre: Rock
- Length: 4:26 (Edit); 4:52 (LP Version)
- Label: Atlantic
- Songwriters: Lou Gramm; Peter Wolf
- Producers: Peter Wolf, Eric "E.T." Thorngren

Lou Gramm singles chronology
"Just Between You and Me" (1989)	"True Blue Love" (1990)

"True Blue Love" is a song by American singer and songwriter Lou Gramm, the original frontman of the rock band Foreigner, and was released in 1990 by Atlantic Records, as the second single from his second solo album, Long Hard Look (1989). It is written by Gramm with Peter Wolf, who produced the song with Eric "E.T." Thorngren. "True Blue Love" peaked at numbers 39 and 40 on the US Cash Box Top 100 and Billboard Hot 100 charts.

== Charts ==
Chart (1990)	Peak Position
US Billboard Hot 100	40
US Album Rock Tracks	23
US Cash Box Top 100	39
