= Hide & Seek (Patterson novel) =

Book by James Patterson

- First edition
- Author: James Patterson
- Language: English
- Genre: Crime novel/Thriller
- Publisher: HarperCollins
- Publication date: Jan 1, 1997
- Publication place: United States
- Media type: Print (Paperback)
- Pages: 368
- ISBN: 978-0006498520

Hide & Seek is a 1997 novel written by novelist James Patterson.

== Plot ==
Maggie Bradford is a successful singer/songwriter who is on trial for murder. She has married twice and it appears that she has shot both husbands. Due to Maggie Bradford's history of killing her first husband to get out of the abusive ways, it began to fuel speculation and accusations when she had again killed her second husband. And the world around her wants to know if this celebrity can really commit these murders.
