= Waiting for a Girl Like You =

- Single cover

Single by Foreigner

from the album 4
- B-side: "I'm Gonna Win"
- Released: October 2, 1981 (U.S.): December 4, 1981 (UK)
- Recorded: 1981
- Genre: Soft rock
- Length: 4:49 (album version); 4:35 (single version)
- Label: Atlantic
- Songwriters: Mick Jones, Lou Gramm
- Producers: Robert John "Mutt" Lange, Mick Jones

Foreigner singles chronology
"Urgent" (1981)	"Waiting for a Girl Like You" (1981)	"Juke Box Hero" (1982)

Music video
- "Waiting for a Girl Like You" on YouTube

"Waiting for a Girl Like You" is a 1981 power ballad by the British-American rock band Foreigner released as the second single from the album 4 (1981) and was co-written by Lou Gramm and Mick Jones. The opening motif was written by Ian McDonald and the distinctive synthesizer theme was performed by the then-little-known Thomas Dolby.

== Reception ==
Billboard said that "The melodic arrangement enhances the lyrics while the tasty orchestration and commanding vocal maximizes the love ballad's effectiveness." Record World called it a "dreamy ballad" and said that "a great title hook, enchanting vocals & keyboards make a perfect radio record."

It has become one of the band's most successful songs worldwide, peaking at number 2 on the Billboard Hot 100, number 1 on Billboard's Rock Tracks chart, and number 1 on the Radio & Records (R&R) Top 40/CHR chart. On both the Billboard and R&R Adult Contemporary chart, the song reached number 5. The song peaked at number 8 on the UK Singles Chart.

"Waiting for a Girl Like You" achieved a chart distinction by spending its record-setting 10 weeks in the number 2 position of the Billboard Hot 100 chart, without ever reaching the top. It debuted on the Hot 100 chart dated October 10, 1981. It reached the number 2 position in the week of November 28, where it was held off the number 1 spot by Olivia Newton-John's single "Physical" for nine consecutive weeks, and then by Hall & Oates' "I Can't Go for That (No Can Do)" for a tenth week on January 30, 1982. Because of its chart longevity, it ended up being the number 19 song on the Top 100 singles of 1982. The song was the band's biggest hit until "I Want to Know What Love Is" hit number 1 in 1985. In Canada, the song was number 2 for 2 weeks, kept out of number 1 by "The Friends of Mr Cairo" by Jon and Vangelis on its 5 week run at number 1.

The song ranked at number 80 on Billboard's "Greatest Songs of All Time". Classic Rock History critic Brian Kachejian rated it as Foreigner's 7th best song, particularly praising the "great keyboard line played at the song’s intro and in between verses."

== History ==
Mick Jones said of writing the song that:

It just came out. I had no idea what it meant, but it got to the point where I couldn't even be in the studio when we were recording it sometimes. It left such a deep impression on me. It's the kind of song that the pen does the writing, and you don't even know where it came from. But I feel that it's stuff that's floating around at times, and you have to grasp it. It's kind of flying around in the air, and you just have to be open enough to let that flow through you.

In his autobiography, Lou Gramm tells of a beautiful, mysterious woman who appeared in the control room when he was recording his vocal and gave him the inspiration to deliver the stirring take that was better than he has ever sung the song. He writes that this ephemeral beauty vanished, and he has never discerned her identity.

The introduction was created by Thomas Dolby using a Minimoog synthesizer. Dolby remembers Mutt Lange leaving him to his own devices in the studio one night, "like a kid locked in a toy shop" to develop the intro to the song with six tracks of the multitrack available. As a result, he made the "Eno-esque" ambient drones. These were sustained single notes in a minor scale, each recorded on a single track of a (separate) 2" multitrack tape; Dolby "played" the faders on the mixing console at Electric Lady Studios (by fading in and out the sustained notes) like a mellotron and bounced down the result onto two tracks. Drummer Dennis Elliott likened the intro to "massage music" but Jones liked it and it stuck.

== Personnel ==
Foreigner

- Lou Gramm – lead vocals
- Mick Jones – keyboards, backing vocals
- Rick Wills – bass, backing vocals
- Dennis Elliott – drums, backing vocals

Additional personnel

- Thomas Dolby – main synthesizers
- Bob Mayo – keyboard textures
- Ian Lloyd – backing vocals
- Robert John "Mutt" Lange – backing vocals

== Charts ==
=== Weekly charts ===
Chart (1981–1982)	Peak position
Australia (Kent Music Report)	3
Austria (Ö3 Austria Top 40)	16
Belgium (Ultratop 50 Flanders)	18
Canada Top Singles (RPM)	2
Canada Adult Contemporary (RPM)	8
Germany (GfK)	29
Ireland (IRMA)	9
Netherlands (Dutch Top 40)	16
New Zealand (Recorded Music NZ)	10
South Africa (Springbok)	14
UK Singles (Official Charts Company)	8
US Billboard Hot 100	2
US Adult Contemporary (Billboard)	5
US Cash Box Top 100	2
US Mainstream Rock (Billboard)	1

2025 weekly chart performance for "Waiting for a Girl Like You"
Chart (2025)	Peak position
Israel International Airplay (Media Forest)	20

=== Year-end charts ===
Chart (1981)	Position
Canada Top Singles (RPM)	34

Chart (1982)	Position
Australia (Kent Music Report)	21
US Billboard Hot 100	19

=== All-time charts ===
Chart	Position
US Billboard Hot 100	100

== Certifications ==
Region	Certification	Certified units/sales
New Zealand (RMNZ)	Platinum	30,000^{‡}
United Kingdom (BPI) Sales since 2004	Gold	400,000^{‡}
United States (RIAA) Physical	Platinum	1,000,000^{^}
United States (RIAA) Digital	Gold	500,000^{‡}
^{^} Shipments figures based on certification alone.^{‡} Sales+streaming figures based on certification alone.

== See also ==
- List of Billboard Mainstream Rock number-one songs of the 1980s
