= Lou Gramm =

American singer (born 1950)

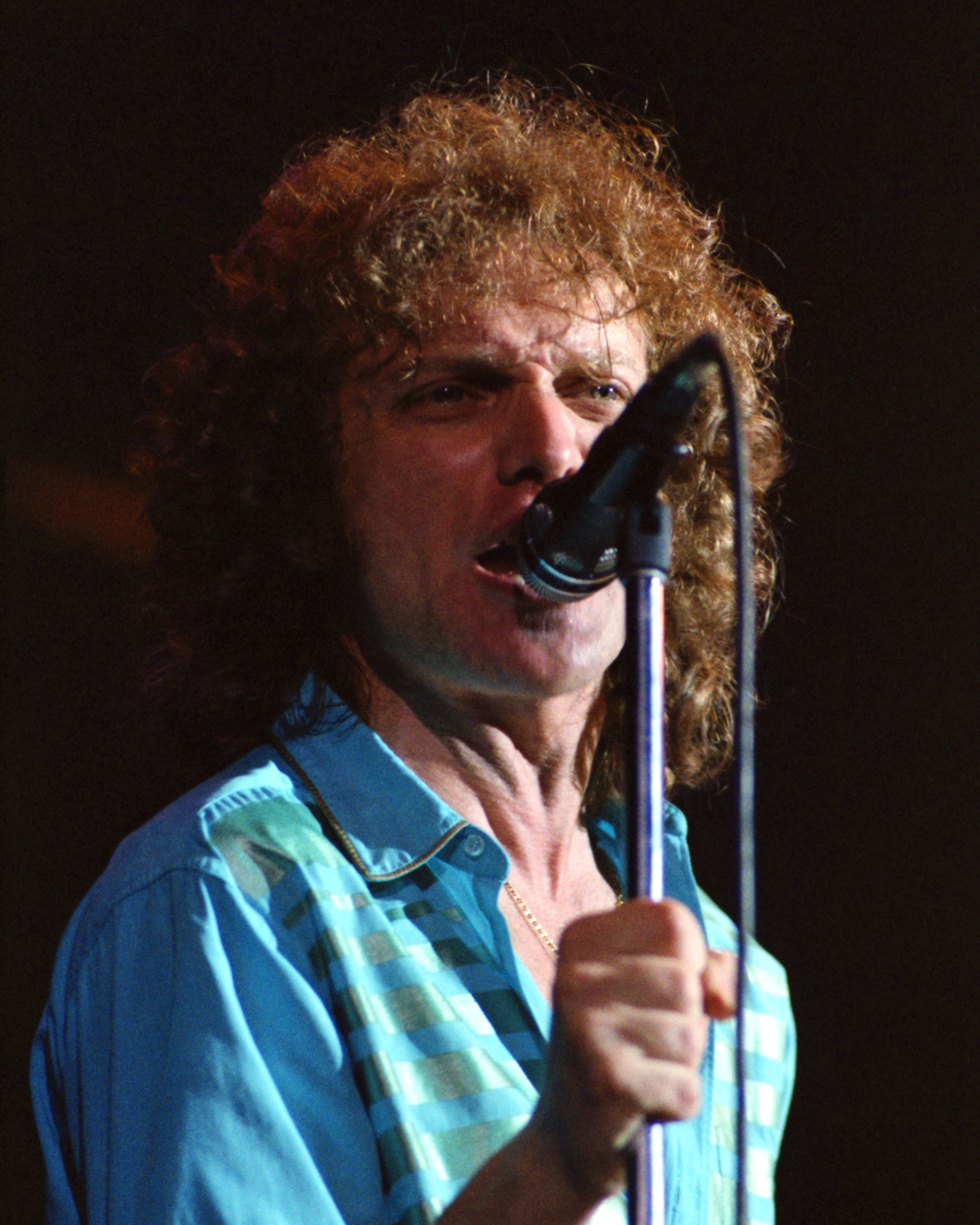
- Gramm performing in 1979

Background information
- Born: Louis Andrew Grammatico; May 2, 1950 (age 76); Rochester, New York, U.S.
- Genres: Rock; hard rock
- Occupations: Singer; songwriter
- Instruments: Vocals; percussion; drums
- Years active: 1974–present
- Formerly of: Black Sheep; Foreigner; Shadow King; Liberty N' Justice
- Website: lougrammofficial.com

Louis Andrew Grammatico (born May 2, 1950), known professionally as Lou Gramm, is an American singer and songwriter. He is best known as co-founder and original frontman of the rock band Foreigner from 1976 to 1990 and again from 1992 to 2003, during which time the band had numerous successful albums and singles.

Gramm is considered among the greatest and most successful rock vocalists of his generation. He co-wrote most of Foreigner's hits with bandmate Mick Jones. Together, they are inducted into the Songwriters Hall of Fame class of 2013. In 2024, Gramm was inducted into the Rock and Roll Hall of Fame as a member of Foreigner.

== Early life ==
Gramm was born on May 2, 1950, in Rochester, New York, the son of Nikki (born Masetta), a singer, and Bennie Grammatico, a band leader and trumpeter. Gramm is of Italian descent. He attended Gates-Chili High School in Rochester, graduating with the class of 1968, and majored in education and art at Monroe Community College.

== Career ==
=== 1970s ===
Gramm became front man for the band Black Sheep. Black Sheep was the first American band signed to the Chrysalis label, which released their first single, "Stick Around" (1974). Soon after this initial bit of success, Black Sheep signed with Capitol Records, releasing two albums in succession: Black Sheep (1975) and Encouraging Words (late 1975). They were the opening act for Kiss when an accident with their equipment truck on the ice-covered New York State Thruway suddenly ended the band's tour on Christmas Eve 1975. Unable to support its albums with live performances, Black Sheep disbanded.

A year earlier, Gramm met his future bandmate Mick Jones. Jones was in Rochester, New York, performing with the band Spooky Tooth, and Gramm had given Jones a copy of Black Sheep's first album (S/T). It was early in 1976, not long after Black Sheep's truck accident, when Jones, in search of a lead singer for a new band he was assembling, expressed his interest in Gramm and invited him to audition.

Gramm traveled to New York to audition and got the job. Lou Grammatico then became Lou Gramm. The band, which was initially known as "Trigger," was later renamed "Foreigner". With Foreigner, Gramm became one of the most successful rock vocalists of the late 1970s and 1980s.

=== 1980s ===
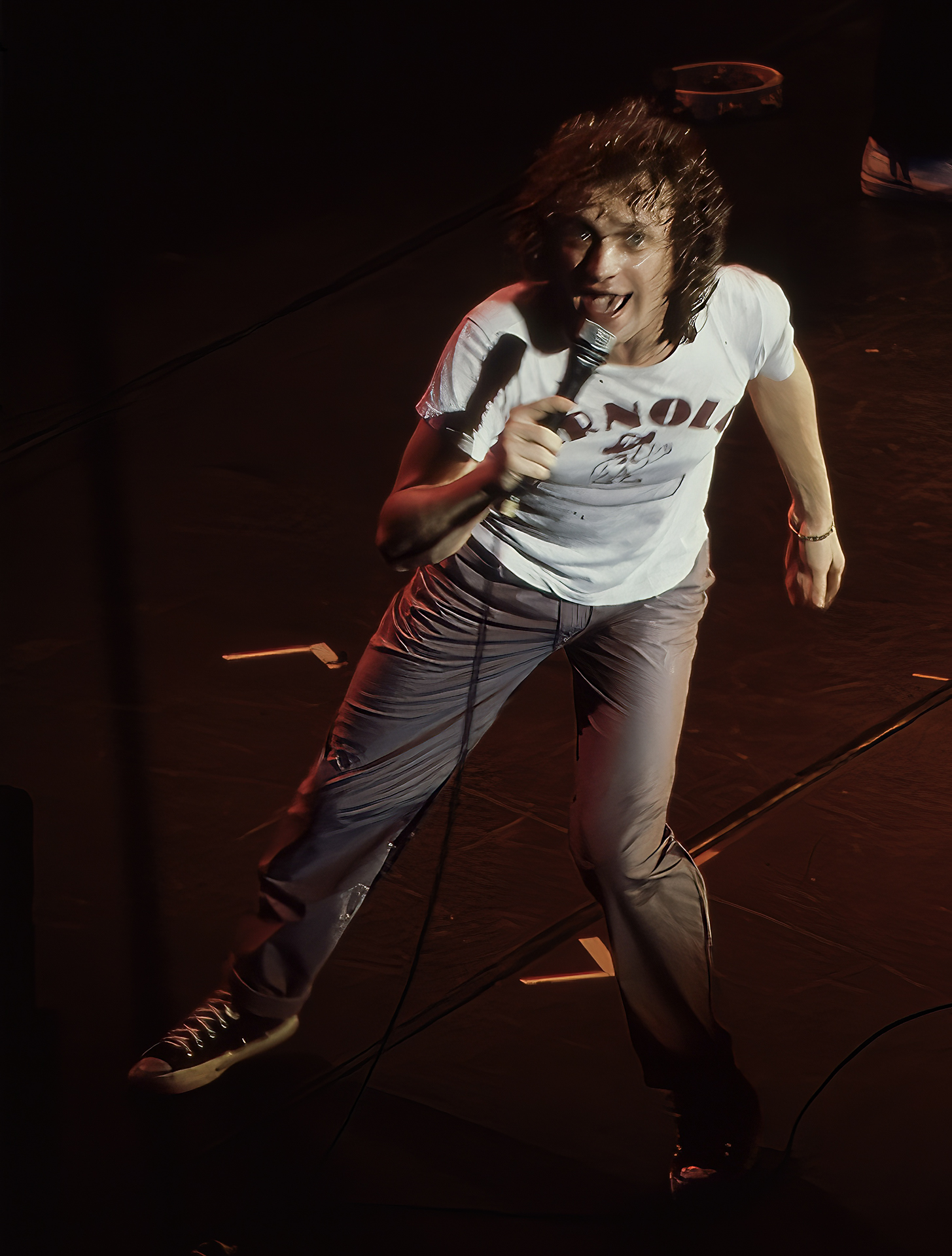
Lou Gramm performing with Foreigner on November 25, 1979

Foreigner's first eight singles cracked the Billboard Top 20, making them the first band since The Beatles to achieve this milestone. Gramm performed vocals on all of Foreigner's hits including "Urgent", "Juke Box Hero", "Break It Up", "Say You Will", and "I Don't Want to Live Without You". He co-wrote most of the band's songs, including the hit ballads "Waiting for a Girl Like You", which spent ten weeks at #2 on the 1981/82 American Hot 100, and "I Want to Know What Love Is", which was a number one hit in eight countries.

Gramm and Jones had a volatile chemistry. Gramm wanted the band to remain true to its purer rock origins, favoring music with a solid drum and guitar structure, whereas Jones embraced the 1980s style of synthesizer ballads. Gramm has called the 4 album (1981) the high point of his work with Foreigner. Foreigner's next album, Agent Provocateur (1984), took three years to release due to the ongoing creative differences between Jones and Gramm. The band released Inside Information in 1987.

Gramm released his first solo album, Ready or Not, in January 1987 to critical acclaim. The single "Midnight Blue" reached the top five.

Also in 1987, Gramm contributed the song "Lost in the Shadows" to the soundtrack for the comedy horror film The Lost Boys.

A second solo effort, Long Hard Look (October 1989), included the top ten hit "Just Between You and Me" as well as "True Blue Love", reached the Top 40. The album also included "Hangin' on My Hip", which was featured in the 1990 film Navy SEALs.

=== 1990s ===
==== Departure and return to Foreigner, brain tumor diagnosis ====
Gramm announced his departure from Foreigner in May 1990 due to differences with Jones, and to focus on his solo career.

Gramm also formed Shadow King with close friend and former Black Sheep bassist Bruce Turgon; their 1991 self-titled album was released by Atlantic Records. Despite positive reviews, the group did not enjoy the level of marketing and promotional support necessary to sustain a new project and soon disbanded. Also in 1991, Gramm contributed the song "One Dream" to the movie Highlander II: The Quickening.

Gramm rejoined Foreigner in May 1992 after working out his differences with Jones during the Los Angeles riots. In 1994, Foreigner released the album Mr. Moonlight on the Rhythm Safari label which, although relatively successful in Europe, was not as widely marketed or distributed in the U.S. Still, "Until the End of Time" made inroads at adult contemporary radio, peaking at number 8.

In 1996, Jones invited Gramm to perform backing vocals on a cover version of "I Want to Know What Love Is" that is he was producing for the Australian singer Tina Arena. The song went on to become a major hit again throughout Europe.

In 1997, Gramm provided vocals for Christian rock band Petra's album titled Petra Praise 2: We Need Jesus.

In April 1997, on the eve of a Japan tour, Gramm was diagnosed with a benign brain tumor and underwent surgery. He continued to work with Jones throughout his illness. By 1998, Gramm was back touring with Foreigner.

=== 2000s to 2020s ===
==== Final departure from Foreigner, solo career (2003–2012) ====
In early 2003, Gramm departed from Foreigner again, his last full tenure membership from the band.

The Lou Gramm Band released its self-titled Christian rock album in 2009 through Spectra Records and Frontiers Records.

==== Autobiography, Songwriters Hall of Fame and Rock and Roll Hall of Fame induction (2013–2024) ====
In May 2013, Gramm released his autobiography Juke Box Hero - My Five Decades in Rock 'n' Roll.

Gramm was inducted into the Songwriters Hall of Fame on June 13, 2013. On July 20, 2017, Gramm joined Foreigner for three songs during an encore at Jones Beach Theatre in Long Island, New York. On December 29, 2018, Gramm announced on stage in Schenectady, New York, that he was retiring from touring. However, he stated that he would continue to release studio music and perform occasional live shows including The Lopen, a celebrity concert produced by Howard Perl Entertainment to benefit children at Akron Children's Hospital.

In 2019, Gramm toured on a bill with Asia Featuring John Payne, where they also acted as his backup group. Gramm performed lead vocals on the track "Sometimes" on the 2019 album The Secret by Alan Parsons.

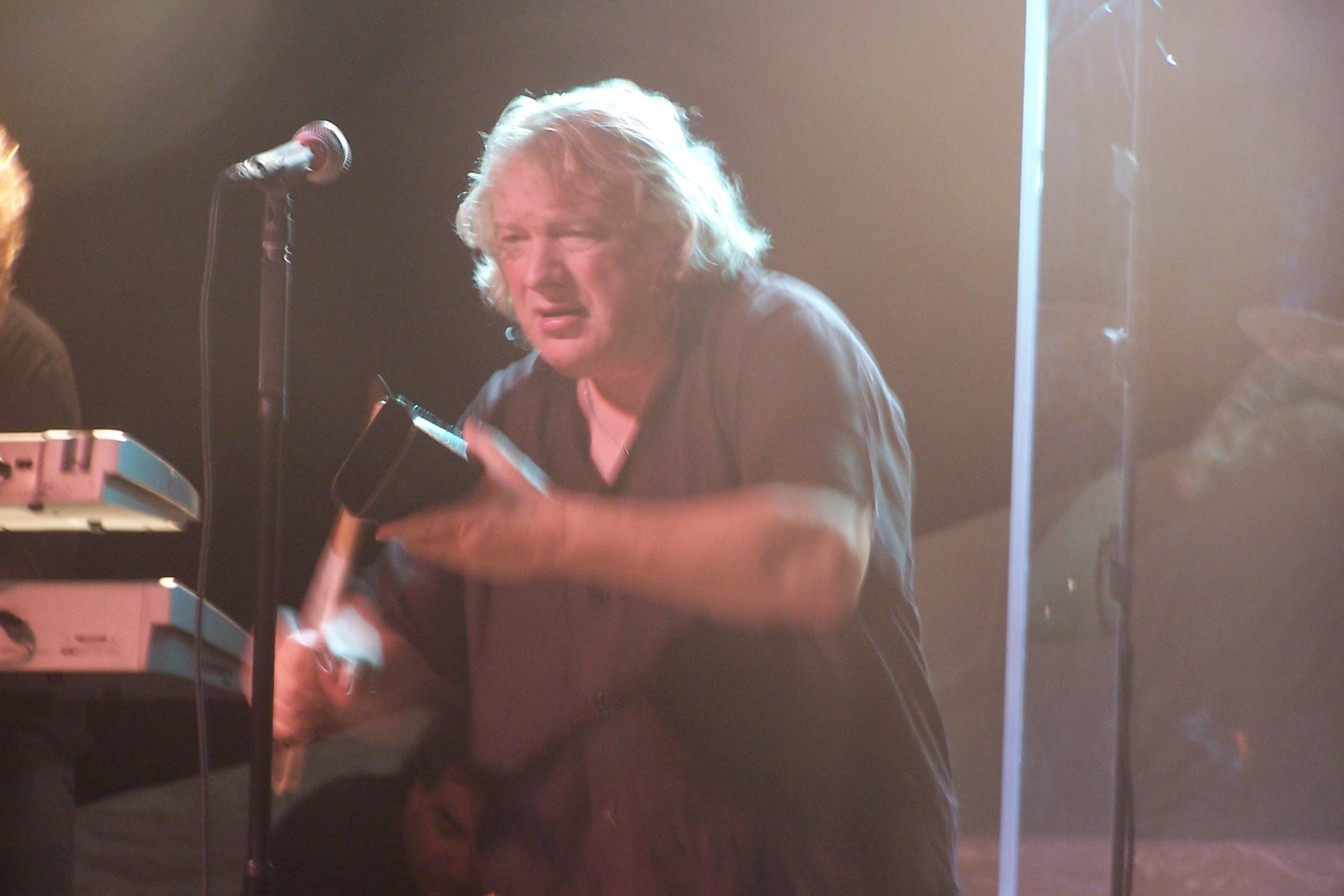
Gramm in 2009

Gramm told RockBandReviews.com in 2019 that he was planning to release some new solo material later that year. Gramm also said he is "thinking about" releasing a greatest-hits package of his non-Foreigner works.

In 2024, Gramm was inducted into the Rock and Roll Hall of Fame as a member of Foreigner alongside Mick Jones, Ian McDonald, Al Greenwood, Dennis Elliott, Ed Gagliardi, and Rick Wills. Coinciding with their induction, Foreigner released the new song "Turning Back the Time" with Gramm on vocals, which was recorded in 1996. Gramm told Billboard earlier that same year: "There were about eight or nine of them. We didn't have a record company then, so we were waiting to see what happened. Then Mick and I had a huge falling out, and I left the band…. So now Mick's got the copy and I don't have one and I don't know if he's ever gonna do anything with them. I kind of doubt it, but I would like to at least listen to those roughs that we did. Those were great ideas."

==== Touring with Foreigner, first new solo album in 37 years (2025–present) ====
In 2025, Gramm joined Foreigner on selected dates of the band's farewell tour.

In January, February, and March 2026, Gramm released the new singles "Young Love", "Long Hard Look", and "Time Heals the Pain" ahead of his new solo album Released, which was released on March 27, 2026. It was his first full-length album since 1989's Long Hard Look.

== Legacy ==
Gramm is considered one of the greatest and most successful rock vocalists of all time. Circus magazine in 1978 upon the release of Hot Blooded commented that Lou Gramm had a voice that Robert Plant might envy. Variety noted that Gramm is one of rock and roll's premier vocalists. Ian Anderson of Jethro Tull was a big fan of Gramm, he stated "Head and shoulders above all rock singers for me is Lou Gramm—incredible precision and diction. You can hear every word he sings, unlike the majority of singers before and since. He had decorative elements in his delivery that weren’t overdone." Gramm is ranked the second greatest Album-oriented Rock vocalists of all-time in a Louder article published on January 14, 2024.

== Personal life ==
In 1992, Gramm, after having completed a stint in drug rehabilitation, became a born again Christian.

In April 1997, Gramm was diagnosed with a type of brain tumor called a craniopharyngioma. Although the tumor was benign, the resulting surgery damaged his pituitary gland. In addition, the recovery program had caused Gramm to gain weight and likewise affected his stamina and voice.

== Discography ==
=== Solo albums ===
Title	Details	Peak chart positions		
Title	Details	US	CAN	AUS
Ready or Not	Release date: January 29, 1987; Label: Atlantic Records; Formats: LP, CD, cassette	27	24	34
Long Hard Look	Release date: October 16, 1989; Label: Atlantic Records; Formats: LP, CD, cassette	27	85	44
Released	Release date: March 27, 2026; Label: HNE Records Ltd, Cherry Red Records; Formats: LP, CD, music download	—	—	—
"—" denotes releases that did not chart

=== Solo singles ===
Year	Song	US 100	US MSR	US AC	UK	NLD	AUS	Album
1987	"Midnight Blue"	5	1	—	82	29	8	Ready or Not
1987	"Ready or Not"	54	7	—	—	—	97	Ready or Not
1987	"Lost in the Shadows"	—	—	—	—	—	—	The Lost Boys Soundtrack
1989	"Just Between You and Me"	6	4	4	—	—	31	Long Hard Look
1990	"True Blue Love"	40	23	—	—	—	—	Long Hard Look
"—" denotes releases that did not chart

=== With Black Sheep ===
- 1974: Stick Around / Cruisin' (For Your Love) – 45 single
- 1975: Broken Promises – 45 single
- 1975: Black Sheep
- 1975: Encouraging Words

=== With Poor Heart ===
- 1988: Foreigner in a Strange Land
- 1993: The Best of the Early Years

(note: These are releases of much older recordings)

=== With Shadow King ===
- 1991: Shadow King

=== With Liberty N' Justice ===
- 2004: Welcome to the Revolution

(note: one track only)

=== With the Lou Gramm Band ===
- 2009: The Lou Gramm Band

== Lou Gramm All Stars members ==
- Lou Gramm – lead vocals, percussion (2003–present)
- Ben Gramm – drums (2003–2016, 2018, 2023–present)
- Michael Staertow – lead guitar, backing vocals (2012–2018, 2024–present)
- Scott Gilman – saxophone, rhythm guitar, backing vocals (2016–2018, 2023–present)
- Jeff Jacobs – keyboards, backing vocals (2017–2018, 2023–present)
- Tony Franklin – bass (2023–present)
- Carol-Lyn Liddle – backing vocals (2023–present)

Timeline
