= Adore Delano discography =

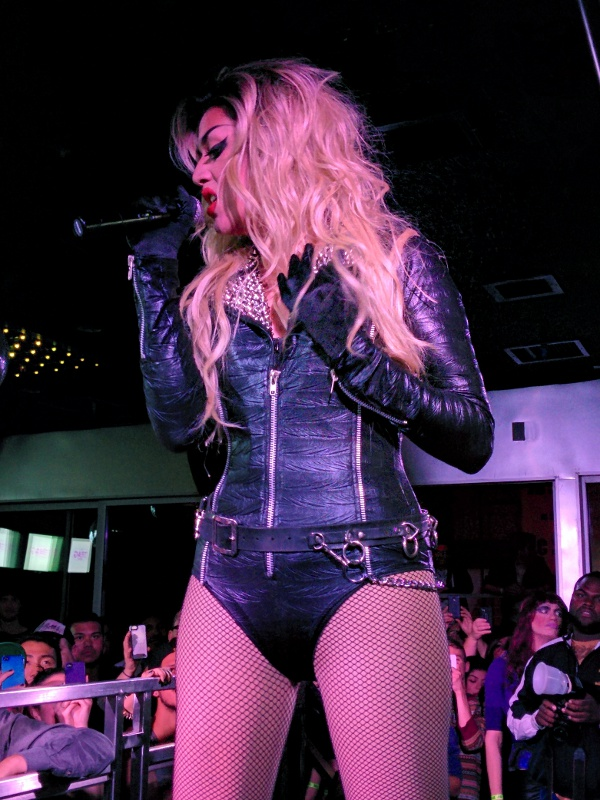
- Noriega as Adore Delano performing on stage in 2014
- Studio albums: 3
- EPs: 1
- Singles: 13
- Music videos: 11
- Promotional singles: 1

The discography of American drag performer and singer Adore Delano consists of three studio albums, one extended play, thirteen singles, one promotional single, and eleven music videos (including one as a featured artist).

== Studio albums ==
List of studio albums, with selected details and chart positions
Title	Details	Peak chart positions		
Title	Details	US	US Dance	US Indie
Till Death Do Us Party	Released: June 3, 2014; Label: Sidecar, Producer Entertainment Group; Formats: CD, digital download	59	3	11
After Party	Released: March 11, 2016; Label: Sidecar, Producer Entertainment Group; Formats: CD, digital download	192	1	13
Whatever	Released: August 18, 2017; Label: Self-released; Formats: CD, digital download, LP	—	—	—

== Extended plays ==
List of EPs, with selected details
Title	Details
Dirty Laundry	Released: July 9, 2021; Label: Self-released; Formats: Digital download

== Singles ==
=== As lead artist ===
List of singles as a lead artist, with selected chart positions
Title	Year	Peak chart positions	Album
Title	Year	US Dance	Album
"24/7" (featuring Diamonique)	2009	—	Non-album single
"D T F"	2014	—	Till Death Do Us Party
"I Adore U"	2014	49	Till Death Do Us Party
"Party"	2014	—	Till Death Do Us Party
"Hello, I Love You"	2014	—	Till Death Do Us Party
"I Look Fuckin' Cool" (featuring Alaska Thunderfuck)	2014	—	Till Death Do Us Party
"My Address Is Hollywood"	2014	—	Till Death Do Us Party
"Jump the Gun"	2015	—	Till Death Do Us Party
"Give Me Tonight"	2015	—	Till Death Do Us Party
"Dynamite"	2016	—	After Party
"Take Me There"	2016	—	After Party
"I.C.U."	2016	—	After Party
"Negative Nancy"	2017	—	Whatever
"Whole 9 Yards"	2017	—	Whatever
"27 Club"	2018	—	Whatever

=== Promotional singles ===
List of promotional singles
Title	Year	Album
"Superstar"	2014	RuPaul Presents The CoverGurlz
"Oh No She Better Don't" (RuPaul featuring Drag Race Season 6 Cast)	2014	Non-album single

=== As featured artist ===
List of singles as a featured artist
Title	Year	Album
"The T" (Alaska Thunderfuck featuring Adore Delano)	2016	Poundcake

== Music videos ==
List of music videos
Title	Year	Director	Ref.
"24/7" (featuring Diamonique)	2009	Streetlight	
"Superstar"	2014	Danny Noriega	
"Oh No She Better Don't" (RuPaul featuring Drag Race Season 6 Cast)	2014	Eve; Trina	
"DTF"	2014	Michael Serrato	
"I Adore U"	2014	Ben Simkins	
"Party"	2014	Peter Breeze	
"Hello, I Love You"	2014	Ben Simkins	
"I Look Fuckin' Cool"	2014	Ben Simkins	
"My Address Is Hollywood"	2014	Jayson Whitmore	
"Jump the Gun"	2015	Josef J. Weber	
"Give Me Tonight"	2015	Jayson Whitmore	
"Dynamite"	2016	Ben Simkins	
"Take Me There"	2016	Ben Simkins	
"I.C.U."	2016	Santiago Felipe	
"The T" (Alaska Thunderfuck featuring Adore Delano)	2016	Ben Simkins	
"Negative Nancy"	2017	Ben Simkins	
"Whole 9 Yards"	2017	Ben Simkins	
"27 Club"	2018	Ben Simkins	
