= Urgent (song) =

1981 single by Foreigner

Single by Foreigner

from the album 4
- B-side: "Girl on the Moon"
- Released: June 22, 1981 (US); July 24, 1981 (UK)
- Recorded: 1981
- Genre: Pop rock; funk rock
- Length: 4:29 (album version); 3:57 (single version)
- Label: Atlantic
- Songwriter: Mick Jones
- Producers: Robert John "Mutt" Lange; Mick Jones

Foreigner singles chronology
"I'll Get Even with You" (1980)	"Urgent" (1981)	"Waiting for a Girl Like You" (1981)

Music video
- "Urgent" on YouTube

"Urgent" is a song by the British-American rock band Foreigner, and the first single from their album 4 in 1981.

== Background ==
Producer Robert John "Mutt" Lange wanted to hear every music idea guitarist Mick Jones had recorded on tape, no matter how embarrassing. One of these ideas was the opening riff for what would become "Urgent". “I had the riff starting out," Jones recalled. "And I said, 'That’s like an experimental instrumental thing that I’m working on.’ He said, ‘No, it isn’t anymore – let’s take that one, because that’s got a lot of potential.’ There wasn’t even a song with it.” He also said, “‘Urgent’ … was a bit of a hybrid. It was a soul song, really – a quirky kind of rock and soul combination. That album had a bunch of different departures on it from the album that preceded it, Head Games. … It was just like a musical journey.” In fact, "Urgent" was recorded with Mick Jones playing lead and rhythm guitar, including a line originally composed for Ian McDonald, who left the band in 1980.

== Recording ==
Foreigner went into the Electric Lady Studios with producer Robert John "Mutt" Lange, best known at the time as producer for hard rock band AC/DC. Foreigner's sound wasn't quite as heavy, and the band worked with then-unknown Thomas Dolby to program and play synthesizer. Dolby's work can be heard on "Urgent." Mark Rivera, Foreigner's regular saxophonist on albums and tours throughout the 1980s, played rhythmic sax on the song, including the recurring siren-like riff. The iconic tenor saxophone solo was performed by celebrated Motown multi-instrumentalist Junior Walker, who was coincidentally performing in New York during Foreigner's album sessions and agreed to contribute.

Lange was a perfectionist with Dolby, making him play some of the simple notes over and over until they were perfect. On the other hand, Dolby recalled Lange using Walker's first take, appreciating its raw, rough edges. Jones stated in an interview that his conflicting memory of Lange fastidiously splicing together multiple takes from Walker, who later mimicked the recorded version when performing with the band as a guest on tour. Lange was a fan of Dolby's earlier work, and Dolby had a demo of a song called "Urges" where he sang "urges, urges...". Lange asked Dolby for permission to incorporate this into a Foreigner song, which was then turned into the lyric "Urgent, urgent...". Dolby was a little surprised when he heard the finished song, but later felt glad to have positively influenced the track. "Urges" later appeared on Dolby's 1982 album The Golden Age of Wireless.

Rivera recorded at least 12 versions of the saxophone solo but ultimately the first version was used in the final release, despite some rough edges.

Jones has rated "Urgent" as one of his 11 favorite Foreigner songs, specifically praising Walker's sax solo and Dolby's "freaky" riffs.

== Reception ==
Billboard said that "Guitars and keyboards supply the rhythmic punch on this tasty rocker." Billboard reviewer Gary Graff rated "Urgent" to be Foreigner's all-time greatest song, particularly praising Dolby's synthesizer and Walker's saxophone but also saying that the song "would have been killer" even without the sax solo. Record World said that "From the opening keyboard throbs to Lou Gramm's lusty vocal growls to Jr. Walker's sax heat, this rocker...is headed to the top of AOR-pop playlists." Classic Rock History critic Brian Kachejian rated it as Foreigner's 6th best song, saying that the "rowdy bouncy feel...is highly addictive."

== Chart performance ==
The song entered the U.S. pop charts the week ending July 4, 1981, and reached No. 4 on the Billboard Hot 100 chart, holding that spot for the entire month of September. "Urgent" hit No. 1 on the Billboard Rock Tracks chart, a position it held for four weeks.

"Urgent" was the most successful single from the 4 album on album-oriented rock radio, though it was outsold by the album's later single, "Waiting for a Girl Like You", which reached No. 2 on the Billboard Hot 100 in November 1981 and remained at that spot through the end of the following January, for a total of ten weeks, being certified gold. 4 went gold and platinum during the chart run of the "Urgent" single. The album has since been certified multi-platinum by the RIAA, for selling over six million copies in the U.S. alone.

The song was Foreigner's second-best-selling single (after "I Want to Know What Love Is") in both Canada and Sweden, reaching No. 1 in Canada in September 1981 and No. 20 in Sweden in March 1982. In Australia, "Urgent" peaked at No. 24 in November 1981, but remained in the top 50 for 24 weeks. In the UK, the song reached only No. 54 on the UK singles chart upon its first release in 1981. In 1982, after "Waiting for a Girl Like You" went top ten there, "Urgent" was re-released, this time reaching only slightly higher, peaking at No. 45.

== Track listings ==
- 1981: "Urgent" b/w "Girl on the Moon" (Atlantic 3831) US 7" single
- 1981: "Urgent" b/w "Girl on the Moon" (Atlantic 11665) UK 7" single
- 1982: "Urgent" b/w "Head Games" (live) (Atlantic 11728) UK 7" single
- 1982: "Urgent" b/w "Head Games" (live)/"Hot Blooded" (live) (Atlantic 11728) UK 12" single

== Chart history ==
=== Weekly charts ===
Chart (1981–1982)	Peak position
Australia (Kent Music Report)	24
Canada Top Singles (RPM)	1
Germany (GfK)	12
South Africa (Springbok)	1
Sweden (Sverigetopplistan)	20
UK Singles Chart (OCC)	54
US Billboard Hot 100	4
US Billboard Mainstream Rock	1
US Billboard Dance	32
US Cash Box Top 100	5

Chart (1982)	Peak position
UK Singles Chart (OCC)	45

Chart (2008)	Peak position
Switzerland (Schweizer Hitparade)	84

=== Year-end charts ===
Chart (1981)	Rank
Canada	7
South Africa	3
US Billboard Hot 100	37
US Cash Box	42

== Personnel ==
Foreigner

- Lou Gramm – lead vocals
- Mick Jones – guitars, backing vocals
- Rick Wills, Robert John "Mutt" Lange – bass, backing vocals
- Dennis Elliott – drums

Additional personnel

- Thomas Dolby – main synthesizers
- Michael Fonfara – keyboard textures
- Mark Rivera – saxophone
- Junior Walker – saxophone solo

== Other versions ==
Foreigner performed a live version of the song on the 1993 album Classic Hits Live.

Live concert versions, featuring Kelly Hansen on vocals, can be heard on the albums Extended Versions (2005) and Can't Slow Down ... When It's Live! (2010).

Foreigner released a Spanish-language version of the song in 2025, featuring current lead vocalist Luis Maldonado.

== Shannon version ==
"Urgent"

Single by Shannon

from the album Do You Wanna Get Away
- Released: September 30, 1985
- Recorded: 1984
- Genre: Synth-pop
- Length: 5:10
- Label: Mirage; Emergency
- Songwriter: Mick Jones
- Producers: Chris Barbosa; Mark Liggett

Shannon singles chronology
"Stronger Together" (1985)	"Urgent" (1985)	"Stop the Noise" (1985)

American singer Shannon recorded a version of the song for her 1985 album Do You Wanna Get Away. Foreigner's label, Atlantic Records, distributed Mirage, the label for the Shannon release. The song was the album's fourth single, peaking at No. 68 for two weeks on the Billboard R&B singles chart in November and December 1985.

=== Track listing ===
12" single

1. "Urgent" - 5:10
2. "Do You Wanna Get Away" - 4:54

=== Charts ===
Chart (1985)	Peak position
US Hot Black Singles (Billboard)	68
UK Singles (OCC)	84

== See also ==
- List of number-one singles of 1981 (Canada)
- List of Billboard Mainstream Rock number-one songs of the 1980s
