= The Century of the Self =

2002 British documentary series

- Title screen
- Written by: Adam Curtis
- Directed by: Adam Curtis
- Country of origin: United Kingdom
- Original language: English
- No. of episodes: 4

Production
- Executive producer: Stephen Lambert
- Producers: Adam Curtis; Lucy Kelsall
- Cinematography: David Barker; William Sowerby
- Running time: 240 mins (in four parts)
- Production companies: RDF Television; BBC

Original release
- Network: BBC Two
- Release: 17 March – 7 April 2002

The Century of the Self is a 2002 British television documentary series by filmmaker Adam Curtis. It focuses on the work of psychoanalysts Sigmund Freud and Anna Freud, and PR consultant Edward Bernays. In episode one, Curtis says, "This series is about how those in power have used Freud's theories to try and control the dangerous crowd in an age of mass democracy."

== Episodes ==
No	Title	Broadcast Date	Notes
1	"Happiness Machines"	17 March 2002	
2	"The Engineering of Consent"	24 March 2002	
3	"There is a Policeman Inside All Our Heads; He Must Be Destroyed"	31 March 2002	
4	"Eight People Sipping Wine in Kettering"	7 April 2002	

== Overview ==
Sigmund Freud, the founder of psychoanalysis, changed our perception of the mind and its workings. The documentary explores the various ways that governments, global organizations and corporations have used Freud's theories. Freud and his nephew Edward Bernays, who was the first to use psychological techniques in public relations, are discussed in part one. His daughter Anna Freud, a pioneer of child psychoanalysis, is mentioned in part two. Wilhelm Reich, an opponent of Freud's theories, is discussed in part three.

To many in politics and business, the triumph of the self is the ultimate expression of democracy, where power has finally moved to the people. Certainly, the people may feel they are in charge, but are they really? The Century of the Self tells the untold and sometimes controversial story of the growth of the mass-consumer society. How was the all-consuming self created, by whom, and in whose interests?

— BBC publicity.

Along these lines, The Century of the Self asks deeper questions about the roots and methods of consumerism and commodification and their implications. It also questions the modern way people see themselves, the attitudes to fashion, and superficiality.

The business and political worlds use psychological techniques to read, create and fulfill the desires of the public, and to make their products and speeches as pleasing as possible to consumers and voters. Curtis questions the intentions and origins of this relatively new approach to engaging the public.

Where once the political process was about engaging people's rational, conscious minds, as well as facilitating their needs as a group, Stuart Ewen, a historian of public relations, argues that politicians now appeal to primitive impulses that have little bearing on issues outside the narrow self-interests of a consumer society.

The words of Paul Mazur, a leading Wall Street banker working for Lehman Brothers in 1927, are cited: "We must shift America from a needs- to a desires-culture. People must be trained to desire, to want new things, even before the old have been entirely consumed. [...] Man's desires must overshadow his needs."

In part four the main subjects are Philip Gould, a political strategist, and Matthew Freud, a PR consultant and the great-grandson of Sigmund Freud. In the 1990s, they were instrumental to bringing the Democratic Party in the US and New Labour in the United Kingdom back into power through use of the focus group, originally invented by psychoanalysts employed by US corporations to allow consumers to express their feelings and needs, just as patients do in psychotherapy.

Curtis ends by saying that, "Although we feel we are free, in reality, we—like the politicians—have become the slaves of our own desires," and compares Britain and America to 'Democracity', an exhibit at the 1939 New York World's Fair created by Edward Bernays.

== Contributors ==
- German: Dr Alfred Pritz, President, World Council for Psychotherapy
- Countess Erzie Károlyi
- Edward Bernays (interviewed 1991)
- Pat Jackson, PR adviser and colleague of Edward Bernays
- Peter Straus, employee of Edward Bernays 1948–52
- Peter Solomon, investment banker, Lehman Brothers
- Stuart Ewen, historian of public relations
- German: Dr Ernst Federn , Viennese psychoanalyst
- Anne Bernays, daughter of Edward Bernays
- George Gallup Jr., pollster
- Marcel Faust, resident of Vienna, 1930s
- Prof. Martin Bergmann, psychoanalyst, US Army 1943–45
- Ellen Herman, historian of American psychology
- Anton Freud, Anna Freud's nephew
- Michael Burlingham, Dorothy Burlingham's grandson
- Dr Robert Wallerstein, psychoanalyst, Menninger Clinic 1949–66
- Dr Harold Blum, psychoanalyst
- Dr Neil Smelser, political theorist and psychoanalyst
- Fritz Gehagen, psychoanalyst and employee of Ernest Dichter
- Hedy Dichter, wife of Ernest Dichter
- Bill Schlackman, psychologist and employee of Ernest Dichter
- Larry Tye, journalist, Boston Globe
- Howard Hunt, Head of CIA Operation, Guatemala, 1954
- Dr Heinz Lehmann, psychiatrist and colleague of Dr Ewen Cameron
- Laughlin Taylor, assistant to Dr Ewen Cameron 1958–60
- Linda MacDonald, patient of Dr Ewen Cameron
- Dr John Gittinger, Chief Psychologist, CIA, 1950–74
- Celeste Holm, actress and former patient of Dr Ralph Greenson
- Dr Leo Rangell, Los Angeles psychoanalyst
- Dr Alexander Lowen, experimental psychotherapist, 1950s
- Morton Herskowitz, student of Wilhelm Reich 1949–52
- Lore Reich Rubin, Wilhelm Reich's daughter
- Robert Pardun, student activist, 1960s
- Herbert Marcuse (interviewed 1978)
- Stew Albert, founding member of Youth International Party
- Michael Murphy, founder of Esalen Institute
- George Leonard, leader, Encounter Group, Esalen Institute, 1960s
- Dr William Coulson, leader, Nuns' Encounter Group
- Daniel Yankelovich, Yankelovich Partners Market Research Inc.
- Werner Erhard, founder of Erhard Seminars Training
- Jesse Kornbluth, journalist, New Times, 1970s
- Jerry Rubin, founder of Youth International Party (interviewed 1978)
- Jay Ogilvy, Director of Psychological Values Research, SRI International, 1979–88
- Amina Marie Spengler, Director, Psychological Values Research Programme, 1978–86
- Jeffrey Bell, speech-writer to Ronald Reagan, 1976–81
- Christine MacNulty, program manager, Values and Lifestyles Team, SRI International 1978–81
- Robert Reich, economist and member of Clinton cabinet 1993–97
- Matthew Wright, tabloid journalist 1993–2000
- Mario Cuomo, Governor, New York 1982–95 (archive)
- Philip Gould, Strategy Advisor for New Labour election campaign 1997
- Dick Morris, Strategy Advisor to President Clinton 1994–96
- Mark Penn, Market Researcher for President Clinton 1995–2000
- Douglas Schoen, Market Researcher for President Clinton 1995–2000
- James Bennet, Washington correspondent, The New York Times
- Derek Draper, assistant to Peter Mandelson 1992–95

== Music ==
- Aaron Copland: Billy the Kid (ballet)
- Arvo Pärt: Spiegel im Spiegel, Für Alina, Fratres
- Dmitri Shostakovich: 24 Preludes and Fugues (Shostakovich), Prelude 1 (C major)
- Gene Austin: My Blue Heaven
- Johannes Brahms: Symphony No. 3 in F Major, Op. 90, beginning of the third movement (poco allegretto)
- Kano: She's a Star (from the album New York Cake)
- Louis Armstrong: What a Wonderful World
- Ralph Vaughan Williams: Fantasia on a Theme by Thomas Tallis
- Raymond Scott: Portofino 2 (from Manhattan Research Inc.)
- The Gold Diggers' Song (We're in the Money) (from the film Gold Diggers of 1933)
- Ennio Morricone: Quelle foto (from the film Le foto proibite di una signora per bene)
- Felix Slatkin: The Green Leaves of Summer
- The John Barry Seven: Hit and Miss

== Awards ==
- Best Documentary Series, Broadcast Awards
- Historical Film of the Year, History Today Trust Awards

Nominated for:

- Best Documentary Series, Royal Television Society
- Best Documentary Series, Grierson Documentary Awards
- Best Documentary, Indie Awards
