= Do You Wanna Get Away =

Do You Wanna Get Away may refer to:

- "Do You Wanna Get Away" (song), a 1985 single by Shannon
- Do You Wanna Get Away (album), a 1985 album by Shannon
