= My Heart's Divided =

Single by Shannon

from the album Let the Music Play
- Released: March 31, 1984
- Recorded: 1983
- Genre: Freestyle; dance-pop
- Length: 4:27
- Label: Mirage/Emergency
- Songwriter(s): Ann Godwin; Chris Barbosa
- Producer(s): Mark Liggett; Chris Barbosa

Shannon singles chronology
"Give Me Tonight" (1984)	"My Heart's Divided" (1984)	"Sweet Somebody" (1984)

"My Heart's Divided" is the third single from freestyle singer Shannon's debut album Let the Music Play.

== Track listing ==
US 12" Single

No.	Title	Length
1.	"My Heart's Divided" (Re-mix Version)	5:01
2.	"Someone Waiting Home"	4:34

== Charts ==
Chart (1984)	Peak Position
U.S. Billboard Hot Dance Music/Club Play	3
