= Shannon (American singer) =

American singer

- Born: Brenda Shannon Greene; May 2, 1958 (age 68); Washington, D.C., U.S.
- Genres: Freestyle; post-disco; dance-pop; hi-NRG
- Occupations: Singer; songwriter
- Instrument: Vocals
- Years active: 1983–present
- Labels: Emergency; Mirage; Atlantic

Brenda Shannon Greene (born May 2, 1958), known professionally as Shannon, is an American singer and songwriter of freestyle and dance-pop music. She is best known for her single "Let the Music Play", which topped the Billboard Dance Club Songs chart in 1983 and was certified gold.

Her studio albums include Let the Music Play (1984), followed by Do You Wanna Get Away (1985) and Love Goes All the Way (1986). In 1999, Shannon appeared in a segment of VH1's One-Hit Wonders, and returned to music with her fourth studio album The Best Is Yet to Come (2000). Her studio album, A Beauty Returns, was released in 2006.

== Career ==
Shannon was born in Washington, D.C., United States. In 1983, she was enrolled at York College in New York City and toured with the New York Jazz Ensemble. Quintin Hicks, an associate of the production team of Mark Liggett and Chris Barbosa, saw Shannon singing with a live band in her cousin's recording studio. She auditioned for Liggett and Barbosa with the song "She Can't Love You Like I Do". They introduced her to the selection "Fire and Ice", which would later evolve into Shannon's signature song, "Let the Music Play" (Mirage Records/Emergency Records); its unique sound, called "the Shannon Sound", would later come to be known as "freestyle". Let the Music Play would also be the title of Shannon's debut studio album, which she released through the team in 1984.

In July 1983, "Let the Music Play" was released on New York-based dance label Emergency and Shannon was invited back to record more songs with Liggett and Barbosa. The single reached #8 on the Billboard Hot 100 and #2 on the Billboard R&B and #1 on the Hot Dance Club Play charts. It also was ranked at #49 of Billboard's Top 100 songs of 1984. It was later ranked #23 among Billboard's best dance songs of all-time.

Her debut studio album, Let the Music Play, was released on February 1, 1984. "Give Me Tonight", the follow-up single, reached the number-two spot on the R&B charts and number one on the Hot Dance Club Play charts. The song went to number 46 on the pop charts. It was one of Billboard's top 30 dance songs for the year of 1984. In the United States, the third single was "My Heart's Divided". The single, featuring Jimi Tunnell as one of the backing vocalists, hit #3 on the Dance Chart. "Sweet Somebody", a mid-tempo soul effort, made the Top 20 in a few European nations.

Shannon's studio album Let the Music Play went on to sell approximately 1.5 million worldwide, with 500,000 of those sold in the United States, earning gold certification. Shannon was nominated for a Grammy Award and received numerous other awards, including the Dinah Washington (Jack the Rapper) Award, the Hall of Fame Award, the Gold Ampex Reel Award, a certified gold disc by the Recording Industry Association of America, and the Best Billboard Top 10 female R&B vocalist.

In 1985, she released her second studio album, Do You Wanna Get Away. The title track was the first single and it became her third single to appear on the Hot 100, and her third single to hit #1 on the Dance Chart. She scored three more dance hits, including "Stronger Together", a cover of "Urgent" by Foreigner, and "Stop the Noise", with a video sponsored by Pepsi and Black Angus. Love Goes All the Way, Shannon's third studio album, was released in 1986.

Shannon asked to be released from her recording contract with Atlantic Records in 1987. She recorded soundtracks, jingles, and the track "Criminal", for the movie Fatal Beauty, starring Whoopi Goldberg. While touring the world, Shannon attended and graduated from the American Academy of Dramatic Arts in New York City.

In 1998, she cowrote and sang on multi-tracks produced by Todd Terry, Tony Moran, and Germany's Sash! and Les Rythmes Digitales. The Shannon single "Move Mania" (Sash!) became an EU dance hit. In 1999, Shannon appeared in a segment of VH1's One-Hit Wonders. Entertainment Tonight also taped a special about her life. She was managed for a period of time by Eric Vega producer of shows and events. In 2005 the NBC TV show Hit Me, Baby, One More Time aired a full interview on Shannon's life, music, and a pre-taped performance in front of a studio audience for national airing.

Shannon's fourth studio album, The Best Is Yet to Come, was released on March 28, 2000. She is credited as 50 percent writer of the album. Chris Barbosa served as a producer, along with Andy "Panda" Tripoli and Tony Moran. This venture thrust Shannon back onto the dance scene and Billboard Music Charts in the early 2000s with top 10 Billboard Dance Remixes by veteran DJ/Mixer Junior Vasquez (For "Let the Music Play – The Lost Mixes" – #3 US Billboard Music Dance Charts), and Hex Hector for "Give Me Tonight". Shannon later released a compilation album, Let the Music Play: The Best of Shannon, in 2004.

On April 20, 2006, Shannon participated in the Freestyle Extranvaganza concert along with artists Lisa Lisa and Cult Jam, the Cover Girls, Coro, and Stevie B The event was sponsored by WKTU, WSKQ, and WCAA in New York.

A fifth studio album, A Beauty Returns, was released in 2006. Today, Shannon is a voting member of the Grammy's (Recording Academy), and she occasionally performs shows around the world. In 2016, Carnival Cruise Line ran a national television campaign featuring music performed by her. In 2017, Shannon was a contestant on the Fox game show Beat Shazam where she was partnered with former Stetsasonic member Bobby Simmons.

== Personal life ==
Shannon has never married and has no children.

== Discography ==
=== Studio albums ===
Year	Album details	Peak chart positions								Certifications
Year	Album details	US	US R&B	CAN	GER	NLD	NZ	SWI	UK	Certifications
1984	Let the Music Play: Release date: February 1, 1984; Label: Atlantic | Mirage	32	11	29	35	47	50	30	52	US: Gold
1985	Do You Wanna Get Away: Release date: May 1985; Label: Atlantic | Mirage	92	39	78	—	—	—	—	—	
1986	Love Goes All the Way: Release date: October 24, 1986; Label: Atlantic	—	—	—	—	—	—	—	—	
2000	The Best Is Yet to Come: Release date: March 28, 2000; Label: Contagious	—	—	—	—	—	—	—	—	
2006	A Beauty Returns: Release date: November 30, 2006; Label: Diggin 4 Brown	—	—	—	—	—	—	—	—	
"—" denotes a recording that did not chart or was not released in that territory.

=== Compilations ===
- Part Time Lovers (1991)
- The Collection (1994)
- The Ultimate Collection (1994)
- Dancefloor Artists Volume 8 – The Best of Shannon (1995)
- The Collection (reissue) (2001)
- Let the Music Play: The Best of Shannon (2004)

=== Singles ===
Year	Single	Peak chart positions										Certifications	Album
Year	Single	US	US R&B	US Dance	AUS	CAN	GER	NLD	NZ	SWI	UK	Certifications	Album
1983	"Let the Music Play"	8	2	1	62	12	5	25	2	23	14	US: Gold	Let the Music Play
1984	"Give Me Tonight"	46	6	1	—	—	26	—	—	—	24		Let the Music Play
1984	"My Heart's Divided"	—	48	3	—	—	—	—	—	—	—		Let the Music Play
1984	"Sweet Somebody"	—	—	—	—	—	46	—	—	—	25		Let the Music Play
1984	"It's You"	—	—	—	—	—	—	—	—	—	—		Let the Music Play
1985	"Do You Wanna Get Away"	49	13	1	—	57	57	—	—	—	—		Do You Wanna Get Away
1985	"Stronger Together"	103	26	25	—	—	—	—	—	—	46		Do You Wanna Get Away
1985	"Urgent"	—	68	—	—	—	—	—	—	—	84		Do You Wanna Get Away
1985	"Stop the Noise"	—	—	—	—	—	—	—	—	—	—		Do You Wanna Get Away
1986	"Love Goes All the Way"	—	—	—	—	—	—	—	—	—	—		Love Goes All the Way
1986	"Prove Me Right"	—	82	—	—	—	—	—	—	—	—		Love Goes All the Way
1987	"Dancin'"	—	—	—	—	—	—	—	—	—	91		Love Goes All the Way
1987	"Criminal"	—	—	—	—	—	—	—	—	—	—		Fatal Beauty
1992	"Rain Song"	—	—	—	—	—	—	—	—	—	—		Non-album singles
1995	"It's Got to Be Love"	—	—	—	—	—	—	—	—	—	—		Non-album singles
2000	"Give Me Tonight 2000"	—	—	3	—	—	—	—	—	—	—		The Best Is Yet to Come
2000	"Let the Music Play 2000"	—	—	32	—	—	—	—	—	—	—		The Best Is Yet to Come
2001	"Let the Music Play" (re-release)	—	—	—	—	—	—	—	—	—	102		Non-album singles
2002	"Let the Music Play 2002"	—	—	—	—	—	83	—	—	—	—		Non-album singles
"—" denotes a recording that did not chart or was not released in that territory.

=== Featured singles ===
Year	Single	Artist	Peak chart positions				Album
Year	Single	Artist	US Dan	GER	NLD	UK	Album
1997	"It's Over Love"	Todd Terry	1	—	—	16	Todd Terry Presents Ready for a New Day
1998	"Let the Music Play '98"	Qwest	—	—	—	—	Non-album single
1998	"Move Mania"	Sash!	25	56	40	8	Life Goes On
2000	"Pulsation"	Illicit	—	—	—	—	Non-album single
"—" denotes a recording that did not chart or was not released in that territory.

== See also ==
- Timeline of Billboard number-one dance songs
- List of artists who reached number one on the U.S. Dance Club Songs chart
