= Let the Music Play =

Let the Music Play may refer to:

- Let the Music Play (Barry White album), 1976, and its title track
- Let the Music Play (single album) (Giorgio Moroder), 1977
- Let the Music Play (Shannon album), 1984
  - "Let the Music Play" (song), a 1983 song by Shannon
- Let the Music Play (Stan Walker album), 2011
- "Let the Music Play", a song by Good Charlotte from their 2010 album Cardiology
- "S.O.S. (Let the Music Play)", a 2009 song by Jordin Sparks
