= Sweet Somebody =

Single by Shannon

from the album Let the Music Play
- Released: July 1984
- Recorded: 1984
- Genre: Dance-pop, freestyle
- Length: 4:44
- Label: Emergency
- Songwriters: Ann Godwin; Curtis Josephs; Rob Kilgore
- Producers: Chris Barbosa, Mark Liggett

Shannon singles chronology
"My Heart's Divided" (1984)	"Sweet Somebody" (1984)	"Do You Wanna Get Away" (1985)

Alternative cover
- 12" Single

"Sweet Somebody" is the fourth single from freestyle singer Shannon's debut album Let the Music Play.

== Track listing ==
Germany 12" single

No.	Title	Length
1.	"Sweet Somebody"	5:55
2.	"My Heart's Divided"	5:01

UK 12" Single

No.	Title	Length
1.	"Sweet Somebody" (Special Extended Version)	5:58
2.	"Sweet Somebody" (Dub)	5:15

== Charts ==
Chart (1984)	Peak Position
German Singles Chart	46
UK Singles Chart	25
