= Happy Days (North End song) =

Single by North End
- B-side: "Tee's Happy"
- Released: 1981
- Recorded: 1979
- Genre: Disco
- Label: Emergency
- Composers: Arthur Baker, Russell Presto, Tony Carbone
- Producers: Arthur Baker, Russell Presto, Tony Carbone

"Happy Days" is a 1981 funk song by North End, produced and written by Arthur Baker, Russell Presto, Tony Carbone. The song was originally developed in Boston where Baker was living in 1979 with vocalist Michelle Wallace. Baker would later move to New York where he met with DJ Tee Scott initially to make an instrumental version of the song. Scott would take the song and would remix it with guitar and overdubs.

The song was released by Emergency Records in 1981 and ended up peaking at 9th place on Billboard's Disco Top 80.

== Background and production ==
Baker said that "Happy Days" was made in 1979 in Boston. Arthur Baker had previously met several musicians through his work on the album he worked on titled TJM which he was uncredited on. Through that project, he met several musicians that he would work on later tracks with. Baker spoke very positively about Presto, calling him "a really great DJ and a great drummer. But a very anal guy [...] But because of that, his sense of rhythm and timing was amazing. He could play to a click track, even back then, which was really uncommon, he'd practiced to a click track. So, we went in. The two of us went in and we were going to do a percussion album. This was before breakbeat albums, before any of that stuff. We decided that for DJs we would do percussion tracks, that people could play to extend records."

The song was done with all live musicians, and tried to get them to play like Gamble and Huff's music and told the musicians he played with to listen to Earl Young and to play as well as he did. Among the uncredited musicians on the track were drummer Russell Presto, keyboard player Andre Booth, and guitarist Charlie Street. Baker recalled that it took five hours to get the drums right for "Happy Days". Michelle Wallace was the vocalist on the track who was found in Boston to perform the vocals. Wallace was part of the Boston-based group the Wallace Sisters. The synthesizer used a handclap from a Minimoog.

Baker's wife, a lawyer, got work in New York which led to her and Baker moving there after Baker had completed "Happy Days". In New York, Baker met Tee Scott and had him mix "Happy Days" at Right Track Recordings in Manhattan. Scott was initially contacted to make an instrumental remix for the “Happy Days”. Baker later admitted that “Tee had a big hand in the overdubs [...] Before, the most that people would add was percussion. But this was the first remix I know of—certainly the first one I was involved with—that actually used guitar and keyboard overdubs, and that was mostly Tee's idea. I named the instrumental version ‘Tee's Happy,’ instead of just ‘instrumental’ or something—mainly because I thought that it would make Tee happy. And I was right!”

== Music ==
"Happy Days" has been described as a disco song. Baker recalled of developing the song based on attending clubs and listening to "what producers are making and what the people at the club are liking", noting he was mildly inspired by the music DJ Larry Levan was playing stating the song had a "George Benson-meets-Chic vibe". Bruce Tantum stated the lyrics of the song "reflect on the simple joys of life with lyrics like “Clap our hands and stomp our feet / Let's all go out and play." The song features syncopated guitar chords, keys, xylophone, and a "funk-fueled rhythm"

"Tee's Happy" predominantly dispenses with the vocals.

== Release ==
"Happy Days" was released by Emergency Records in 1981. The song peaked at 9th place on Billboard's Disco Top 80 chart.

== Reception ==
The song was played by many of the top DJs in New York of the period, including John “Jellybean” Benitez at the Funhouse and Larry Levan would play the b-side of "Happy Days" titled "Tee's Happy" at the Paradise Garage in New York often. Baker declared that the single sold 40,000 12”s in New York.

Baker looks back positively on the song, stating "We thought we got the sound right. It was really crisp; all the elements were there. It's one of my favorite 10 records I’ve ever been involved with.”

== Track listing ==
12" single (EMDS 6520)

1. "Happy Days" – 7:55
2. "Tee's Happy" – 6:15

== Credits ==
Credits adapted from the 12" single release on Emergency Records.

- Arthur Baker – producer, composer
- Russell Presto – producer, composer
- Tony Carbone – producer, composer
- Tee Scott – mixing
