= Twenty Four Seven =

Twenty Four Seven may refer to:

- Twenty 4 Seven, a Dutch hip-house band
- Twenty Four Seven (album), an album by Tina Turner
- Twenty Four Seven (Dallas Crane album), an album by Dallas Crane
- Twenty Four Seven Tour, a tour by Tina Turner
- Twenty Four Seven (film), a film by Shane Meadows

== See also ==
- 24/7 (disambiguation)
