= Can't Hold Back =

Can't Hold Back may refer to:

== Albums ==
- Can't Hold Back (Pure Prairie League album) or the title song, 1979
- Can't Hold Back (Eddie Money album) or the title song, 1986

== Songs ==
- "Can't Hold Back" (song), by Kaz James, 2009
- "Can't Hold Back", by Anton Ewald, 2013
- "Can't Hold Back", by You Me at Six from Night People, 2017
- "Can't Hold Back", by Zara Larsson from 1, 2014
- "Can't Hold Back (Your Lovin')", by Kano from New York Cake, 1982

== See also ==
- "I Can't Hold Back", a 1984 song by Survivor
