= One Hit Wonder =

A one-hit wonder is a musical artist known for only one hit single.

One Hit Wonder or One-Hit Wonder may also refer to:

== Music ==
- One Hit Wonder (band), a Californian punk band
- "One Hit Wonder", a 1996 song by Tracy Bonham from The Burdens of Being Upright
- "One Hit Wonder", a 1997 song by Everclear from So Much for the Afterglow
- "One-Hit Wonder", a 2016 B-side song by the Pet Shop Boys from The Pop Kids

== Film and television ==
- One-Hit Wonders (American TV series)
- One Hit Wonders (Canadian TV series), a Canadian music video program
- "One Hit Wonder" (CSI), an episode of CSI: Crime Scene Investigation
- One Hit Wonder (film), a Filipino romantic comedy musical film

== Other uses ==
- One Hit Wonder, a 2001 novel by Lisa Jewell

== See also ==
- One Hit Wonderland, a book by Tony Hawks
