= She's a Star (disambiguation) =

"She's a Star" is a 1997 song by James

- "She's a Star", song by Barry Manilow from Tryin' to Get the Feeling, lyrics revised as "He's a Star" on 15 Minutes (Barry Manilow album)
- "She's a Star", single by Italian band Kano from New York Cake 1981
- "She's a Star", single by Louis A. McCall and Con Funk Shun 1986
- "She's a Star", song by Survivor from Too Hot to Sleep 1988
- "She's a Star", song by will.i.am from Songs About Girls 2007 Polow da Don
- "She's a Star", single by Baby Shakes 2015
