= Stronger Together =

Stronger Together may refer to:

- Stronger Together (book), a 2016 United States presidential campaign slogan of Hillary Clinton and the title of a book that outlined her platform
- "Stronger Together" (song), a song by Shannon from the 1985 album Do You Wanna Get Away
- "Stronger Together" (Supergirl), an episode of the television series Supergirl
- Stronger Together, Tous Ensemble, a 2020 Canadian benefit performance simulcast during the coronavirus pandemic
