= 24/7 (disambiguation) =

24/7 or Twentyfour Seven usually refers to something available or active at all times (i.e., 24 hours a day, 7 days a week).

It may also refer to:

== Music ==
- Twenty 4 Seven, a Dutch hip-house band

=== Albums ===
- 24/7 (Dino album), 1989
- 24/7 (Gerald Albright and Norman Brown album), 2012
- 24/7 (GusGus album), 2009
- 24/7 (Kevon Edmonds album) or the title song (see below), 1999
- 24/7 (Rojo album), 2003
- 24/7 (EP), by U.D.O., 2005
- 24/Seven (album), a 2013 album by Big Time Rush, or the title song
- 24/Seven, a 2006 album by Seven
- Twenty Four Seven (Tina Turner album), 1999
- Twenty Four Seven (Dallas Crane album), 2000
- TwentyFourSeven (UB40 album), 2008

=== Songs ===
- "24/7" (2Yoon song), 2013
- "24/7" (3T song), 1995
- "24/7" (Kevon Edmonds song), 1999
- "24/7" (Meek Mill song), 2019
- "24/7 (Crazy 'bout Your Smile)", by Nikki Webster, 2002
- "TwentyFourSeven" (song), by Artful Dodger, 2001
- "24/7", by Adore Delano and Diamonique
- "24/7", by Becky G from Mala Santa
- "24/7", by Exo from Don't Mess Up My Tempo
- “24/7”, by Twice from Twicetagram

== TV ==
- twentyfourseven, an MTV reality series
- TwentyfourSeven, an Australian comedy series
- 24/7 (TV channel), a 24-hour news channel based in Boise, Idaho, United States
- 24/7 (American TV program), an American sports documentary program broadcast on HBO
- 24/7 (Philippine TV series), a Philippine television series
- 24Seven (British TV series), a British television series

== Film ==
- Twenty Four Seven (film), a 1997 film by Shane Meadows
- 24/7 Film Festival, a film competition held annually in New South Wales, Australia

== Other ==
- Radio24syv, a former Danish radio station.
- 24-7 Prayer, a Christian movement committed to continuous prayer around the clock
- 24seven (magazine), a magazine published by the Department of Fire and Emergency Services of Western Australia
- 24seven (company), a former United Kingdom utility management company
- [24]7.ai, a company in the area of automated customer service
- Taurus PT 24/7, a firearm
- July 24, written as 24/7 in the European format
- WWE 24/7 Championship, a professional wrestling championship defended 24/7
- 24/7, a low cost brand of cigarettes

== See also ==
- 24-7-365 (disambiguation)
