= Love Goes All the Way =

Studio album by Shannon
- Released: October 24, 1986 (U.S.)
- Recorded: 1986
- Studio: GPI/Electric Blue Studios (Long Island, NY)
- Genre: Dance-pop; pop rock; freestyle; soul
- Label: Atlantic
- Producer: Robbie Buchanan; Russell Taylor; Chris Barbosa; Mark Liggett; Patrick Adams

Shannon chronology
| Do You Wanna Get Away (1985) | Love Goes All the Way (1986) | The Best Is Yet to Come (2000) |

Singles from Love Goes All the Way
- 1. "Love Goes All the Way"; 2. "Prove Me Right"; 3. "Dancin'"

Professional ratings
Review scores
| Source | Rating |
|---|---|
| AllMusic | 3/5 stars |

Love Goes All the Way is the third studio album by American singer Shannon, released on October 24, 1986. It was released by Atlantic Records, on which the artist served as an executive producer, with some tracks produced by Patrick Adams and Robbie Buchanan. The record also released three singles: "Love Goes All the Way", "Prove Me Right", and "Dancin'". The second single, "Prove Me Right", was the only song to garner any airplay, peaking at No. 82 on the Billboard Hot R&B chart.

== Track listing ==
| No. | Title | Writer(s) | Length |
|---|---|---|---|
| 1. | "Prove Me Right" | Allan Rich; Dorothy Sea Gazeley; Jeff Pescetto | 4:13 |
| 2. | "Love Goes All the Way" | Pescetto; Jim Sullins | 3:49 |
| 3. | "Dancin'" | Russell Taylor; Shannon | 4:56 |
| 4. | "Sabotage My Heart" | Bonnie Karlyle; Louie Stone | 4:52 |
| 5. | "You Put a Spark in My Life" | Patrick Adams; Tameka Holt | 4:31 |
| 6. | "Right Track" | Taylor; Shannon; Gary Smith | 5:06 |
| 7. | "Faces in the Crowd" | Joe Curiale; Roy Freeland | 4:01 |
| 8. | "You Blew" | Adams; Larri Lee | 4:45 |

== Personnel ==
Musicians

- Shannon – lead vocals (all tracks), backing vocals (3)
- Binker – drums (1, 2)
- Dann Huff – guitar (1, 2)
- Robbie Buchanan – keyboards (1, 2)
- Darryl Phinnessee, Siedah Garrett, Edie Lehman – backing vocals (1, 2)
- Richard Cummings – keyboards (3, 6), backing vocal arrangements (3, 6)
- Greg Arnold – drum programming and keyboards (3, 6)
- Nate Wingfield – guitar (3)
- Russell Taylor – bass (3, 6) (lead bass on 6)
- Morris Goldberg – saxophone (6)
- Victoria Dewindt – backing vocals (3, 4, 5, 7, 8)
- Cindy Mizelle – backing vocals (3)
- Jenny Douglas, Branice McKenzie, Sharon Brooks – backing vocals (6)
- C.P. Roth – keyboards (4, 7)
- Carl Sturken – guitar (4, 7)
- Evan Rogers – backing vocals (4, 7)
- Patrick Adams – keyboards and programming (5, 8)
- Pancho Morales – congas (8)
- Lucy Martin, Rainy Davis – backing vocals (5, 8)

Production and artwork

- Bob Defrin – art direction
- Shannon – executive producer
- Dennis King – mastering
- Roy Volkman – photography
