= Whatever (Adore Delano album) =

Studio album by Adore Delano
- Released: August 17, 2017
- Genre: Alternative rock; grunge; punk rock
- Length: 42:42

Adore Delano chronology
After Party (2016)	Whatever (2017)

Whatever is the third studio album by American drag performer and recording artist Adore Delano, released on August 18, 2017.

== Background and recording ==
Whatever is Adore Delano's third studio album, following Till Death Do Us Party (2014) and After Party. Whatever marked a genre shift from pop to rock. She has said of her decision to pivot:

It was definitely a risk that I was willing to take because I was going along, and—I know it sounds dumb—but I was so over touring and making pop. I just wanted to do what I wanted to fucking do. The fans have been really receptive, surprisingly, and they've been more welcoming than I thought they'd be. I just rolled the dice and… hey, they're still tagging along, man. These kids seem to like me! I don't know why they like me, but whatever! I'm down. And I'm going to continue doing shit that I like.

On recording the album, she has recalled:

The headspace I was in was dark. I wanted to die some days, and [at times] I didn't eat for three days straight. I was obsessed with getting every sound right. I stayed up for hours smoking bud and writing... Nathan put up with my obsessive energy and delivered my baby.

== Composition ==
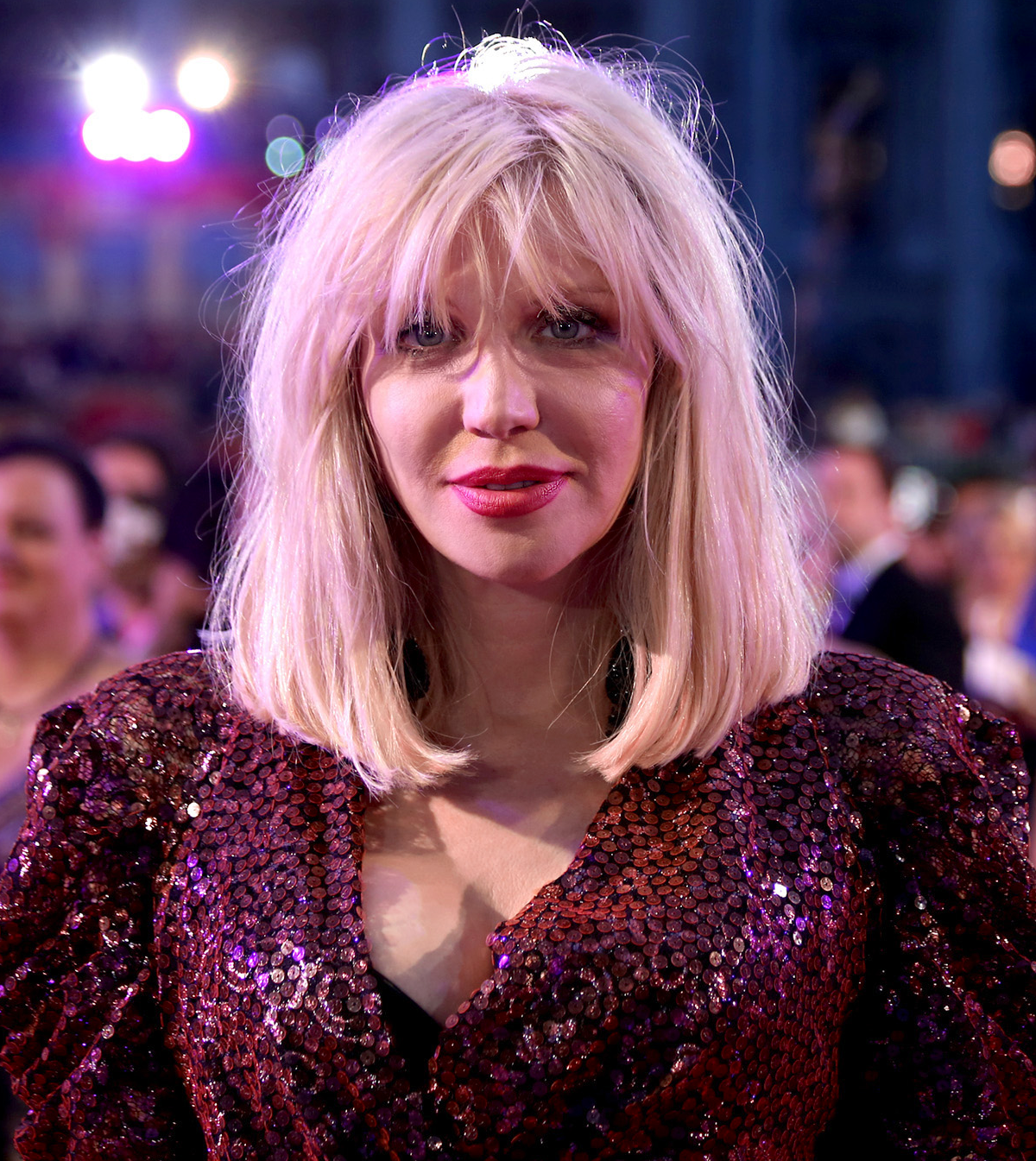
Musically, the album was inspired by the music of Seattle and the Pacific Northwest, including Courtney Love (pictured).

The alternative rock, grunge, and punk rock album is approximately 42 minutes, 48 second in length. Billboard's Brandon Voss described the album as "guitar-fueled". Musically, Adore Delano was inspired by the music of Seattle and the Pacific Northwest, including Kurt Cobain, Courtney Love, and Babes in Toyland.

The song "27 Club" refers to the numerical cultural phenomenon of the same name, a list of famous people who died at the age of 27. Adore Delano penned the song "out of a genuine place of fear -- she had been experimenting with drugs and knew that her habits could make her the club's newest member". According to Sam Chapman of Alternative Press, the song's lyrics "hint at the mental turbulence that drove much of the record and Delano's relocation to Seattle in the first place".

== Release and promotion ==
"Negative Nancy" served as the album's lead single and received a music video. Adam Salandra of NewNowNext wrote, "The video finds Adore playing with gender while playing on a softball team, and celebrates the power of not conforming to society’s rules." Billboard debuted the music video for "Whole 9 Yards" on August 21, 2017.

The music video for "27 Club" was directed by Ben & Katelyn Simkins and filmed in Denver. Released in July 2018, Out described the video as "steamy". Stephen Daw of Billboard wrote, "The clip shows Delano writhing around a motel room, bathing in roses and praying at an altar to survive her 27th year on Earth, while channeling the grunge-rock sound of iconic groups like Nirvana, Pearl Jam and Alice in Chains."

== Reception ==
Brandon Voss of Billboard said the album "shows off an edgier, angrier side to the androgynous party princess". Alternative Press' Sam Chapman described Whatever as "a bona fide alt-rock album" and "an 11-track suite of growly, straightforward rock songs". He called "27 Club" one of the album's "standout" tracks, and wrote about the song's references to 27 Club, "It's an unexpected but fitting fixation for a drag musician, since drag queens are, by their nature, creatures of self-invention and mythologizing." Daisy Jones of Vice said the album "basically sounds like Courtney Love and Britney Spears if they'd had a lovechild and raised it on stage in Vegas". Allison Stubblebine of Billboard ranked Whatever number nine in her list of the "Top 10 Albums by LGBTQ Artists in 2017: Critics' Picks".

== Track listing ==
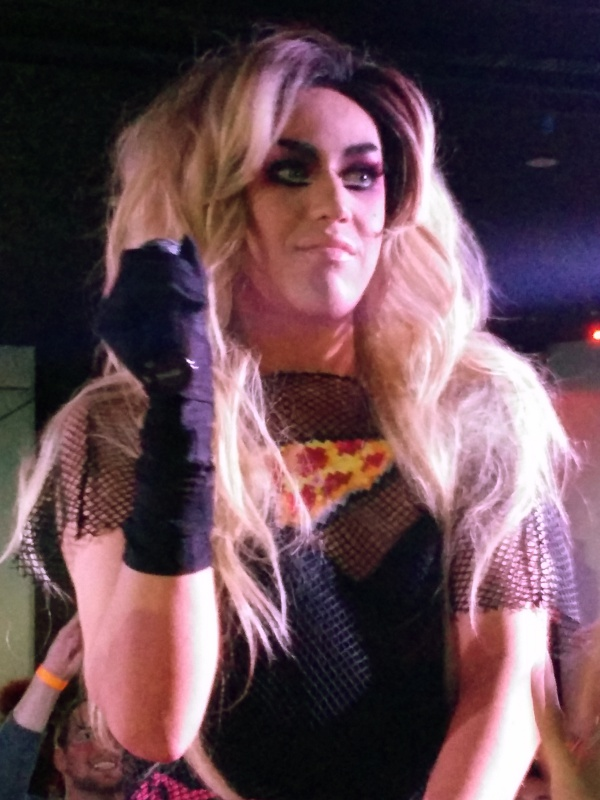
Adore Delano in 2014

Track listing adapted from the Apple Store and Spotify

1. "Adam's Apple" – 2:28
2. "27 Club" – 4:16
3. "Butterfly" – 3:31
4. "No School" – 4:16
5. "Whole 9 Yards" – 3:28
6. "Pretty Boys Cry" – 3:51
7. "Negative Nancy" – 3:47
8. "Princess Cut" – 3:34
9. "Witch Hunt" – 5:00
10. "But Her Fly" – 3:33
11. "Hole Nine Yards" – 4:48
