= Give Me Tonight =

Single by Shannon

from the album Let the Music Play
- Released: February 1984
- Recorded: 1983
- Genre: Latin freestyle R&B
- Label: Mirage/Atco/Atlantic Records
- Songwriters: Chris Barbosa, Ed Chisholm
- Producers: Mark Liggett; Chris Barbosa

Shannon singles chronology
"Let the Music Play" (1983)	"Give Me Tonight" (1984)	"My Heart's Divided" (1984)

Music video
- "Give Me Tonight" on YouTube

"Give Me Tonight" is a 1984 single by Shannon, an American R&B and dance artist. Released as the follow-up to her smash debut "Let the Music Play," "Give Me Tonight" was not as successful as its predecessor on the Billboard Hot 100, where it peaked at #46. It did, however, receive the same enthusiastic response in the dance clubs as her previous single, hitting the top spot on the Hot Dance Club Play chart in March 1984 for two weeks. It also was a significant Urban hit, reaching #6 on the American R&B chart. The song also peaked at #24 on the UK singles chart. The vocal on the chorus is by session guitarist/vocalist Jimi Tunnell, who was uncredited.

In 2000 Hex Hector remixed the song and the mixes were called the "Give Me Tonight (2000 A.D. Mixes)".

On June 7, 2020 cjBlender posted a remix created in 1984 on youtube, titled "Shannon - "Give Me Tonight" (club mix, 1984) - reel #5258"

== Charts ==
Chart (1984)	Peak Position
German Singles Chart	26
UK Singles Chart	24
U.S. Billboard Hot 100	46
U.S. Billboard Hot Dance Music/Club Play	1
U.S. Billboard Hot R&B/Hip-Hop Singles & Tracks	6

== Other versions ==
- In 1995, Leila K released the song "Electric." The chorus (sung by Jessica Folcker) has the same melody as "Give Me Tonight". Chris Barbosa and Ed Chisolm share songwriting credits together with Denniz PoP, Max Martin, Herbie Crichlow and Leila K.
- In 2014, Adore Delano covered the song on the album Till Death Do Us Party. In 2015, it was released as the 8th and final single from the album with an accompanying music video.

== See also ==
- List of number-one dance singles of 1984 (U.S.)
