= Tee Scott =

American DJ (1948–1995)

Marc Allen Scott (September 17, 1948 – December 12, 1995), also known as Toraino Scott or Tee Scott, was an American DJ and remixer in the disco era working in New York City. He was born in the Bronx.

== Biography ==
Tee's remixes includes First Choice's Love Thang, Junior Giscombe's Mama Used To Say, Northend's Happy Days and Roberta Flack and Donny Hathaway's Back Together Again. Among the first to use three turntables and sound effects, he was known for "riding" two or more records at a time, and as an innovator of the modern club mix.

On September 20, 2004, Tee was inducted into the Dance Music Hall of Fame for his many outstanding achievement as a DJ.

Early influences included a musical household (including a classically trained pianist father), and membership in both the boro-wide and citywide choruses. Tee formed a number of 3 and 4 member voice boy singing groups with his neighbors in the 60s, even recording a few demos of original songs, but none of those groups stayed together.

After graduating from George Westinghouse High School, Scott was offered a full scholarship to Wilberforce University, but he declined in favor of helping to create this new form of music, which seemed tailor-made for someone whose main interests were popular music (particularly R&B) and electronics. He received an A.S. degree in computer science from ITT Tech, conferred posthumously.

Scott built his reputation at the club Better Days on 49th Street between 8th & 9th Avenues in Manhattan, where he was resident DJ for over six years. Initially he not only DJ'd, he simultaneously worked the light show. With his background in electronics, he was instrumental in designing and installing the lights and sound system in the club. He DJ'd at Club Zanzibar in Newark, New Jersey in the 1980s as well, home to the Jersey Sound brand of deep house or garage house. Tee was a regular and/or guest DJ at Cheetah, Mellon, Sound Factory, Clubhouse in DC, Warehouse in Chicago and many other clubs. He was one of the few DJs allowed to spin at the legendary Paradise Garage. He also gave Frankie Knuckles his first DJ gig—Mondays and Tuesdays at the Better Days.

One of the seminal Tee Scott interviews was conducted by Danny Wang: https://www.boysownproductions.com/zine/2018/1/30/daniel-wang-meets-tee-scott

== Sources ==
- Brewster, Bill and Broughton, Frank (1999) Last Night a DJ Saved my Life: the History of the Disc Jockey Headline Book Publishing Ltd. ISBN 0-7472-6230-6
- Lawrence, Tim (2004). Love Saves the Day: A History of American Dance Music Culture, 1970-1979 . Duke University Press. ISBN 0-8223-3198-5.
