= 24-7-365 (disambiguation) =

24-7-365 or 24/7/365 means "at any time, all year round."

24-7-365 may also refer to:

- 24-7-365 (N2Deep album), 1994
- 24-7-365 (Neal McCoy album), 2000
- "24 / 7 / 365", a song by Surfaces from Surf
- "247365", a song by John Farnham from Jack
- "365247" (flip) a song by Day6 from The Book of Us: Entropy

== See also ==
- 24/7 (disambiguation)
