= I Adore U =

Single by Adore Delano

from the album Till Death Do Us Party
- Released: June 3, 2014
- Recorded: 2014
- Genre: Dance
- Length: 3:42
- Label: Sidecar
- Songwriters: Danny Noriega, Ashley Levy

Adore Delano singles chronology
"DTF" (2014)	"I Adore U" (2014)	"Party" (2014)

"I Adore U" is the second single from drag queen Adore Delano's debut album Till Death Do Us Party. It was released on June 3, 2014.

== Background ==
"I Adore U" was released as the second official single of Adore's debut album. Adore announced on her official Twitter page that the song would be released on June 3, and that it would have a music video.

== Chart performance ==
The song debuted at no. 49 on the Hot Dance/Electronic Songs chart and at no. 34 on Dance/Electronic Digital Songs. It sold 4,000 downloads in its first week.

== Music video ==
The music video was released on June 3, 2014, to YouTube, and was directed by Ben Simkins. In the web series "Let the Music Play", Delano stated that she wanted the video to reflect what she had gone through, and why she wrote the song in the first place.

== Charts ==
Chart (2014)	Peak position
US Hot Dance	49
US Digital Dance	34
