= Do You Wanna Get Away (song) =

Single by Shannon

from the album Do You Wanna Get Away
- Released: 1985
- Genre: Post-disco
- Length: 4:54 (album version)
- Label: Mirage/Emergency
- Songwriters: Ann Godwin; Chris Barbosa
- Producers: Chris Barbosa; Mark Liggett

Shannon singles chronology
"Sweet Somebody" (1984)	"Do You Wanna Get Away" (1985)	"Stronger Together" (1985)

Alternative covers
- 12" single
- ,

Music video
- YouTube

"Do You Wanna Get Away" is a 1985 song by American dance pop singer Shannon. It was released as the lead single from her second studio album of the same name. It was her third number one dance chart hit in less than two years. The single spent two weeks at number one on the US Dance Club Play chart, and reached the top 20 on US Soul Singles chart and charted on the US Hot 100.

== Track listing ==
US 12" Single

No.	Title	Length
1.	"Do You Wanna Get Away" (Vocal/Long Version)	4:57
2.	"Do You Wanna Get Away" (Long Dub Version)	6:07

== Charts ==
Chart (1985)	Peak Position
German Singles Chart	57
U.S. Billboard Hot 100	49
U.S. Billboard Hot Dance Music/Club Play	1
U.S. Billboard Hot Dance Music/Maxi-Singles Sales	2
U.S. Billboard Hot Black Singles	13

== See also ==
- List of number-one dance singles of 1985 (U.S.)
- List of post-disco artists and songs
