= Fatal Beauty (soundtrack) =

Fatal Beauty (soundtrack album)

Soundtrack album by various artisis
- Released: November 1987
- Length: 35:30
- Label: Atlantic LP 81809
- Producer: David Chackler, Sylvia Rhone

Fatal Beauty (soundtrack album) is the official soundtrack album for the 1987 movie Fatal Beauty. Executive producers were David Chackler and Sylvia Rhone; music coordinators were Marty Wekser for Sounds of Film, Ltd. and Merlin Bobb for Atlantic Recording Corporation.

== Track listing ==
1. "Donna Allen - Make It My Night" (4:12)
  _{(Danny Sembello/Tony Haynes) No Pain, No Gain/Unicity Music/Ertloejay Musique/WB Music Corp., ASCAP}
  Produced by Jeff Smith and Peter Lord
2. "LeVert - Casanova" (5:01)
  _{(Reggie Calloway) Calloco Music/Hip Trip Music, BMI}
  Produced by Reggie Calloway and Vincent Calloway for Calloco, Inc.
3. "Madame X - Just That Type of Girl" (6:22)
  _{(Bernadette Cooper/Cornelius Mims) Slap Me One! Music/Cornelio Carlos Music/Spectrum VII Music, ASCAP}
  Produced by Bernadette Cooper for Slap Me One! Productions and Cornelius Mims
4. "Miki Howard - Edge of Love" (4:35)
  _{(Cynthia Weil/Scott Cutler) Dyad Music/Tyrell-Mann Music, BMI}
  Produced by Steve Tyrell and David Kitay for the Tyrell Music Group
5. "Shannon - Criminal (Theme from Fatal Beauty)" (3:38)
  _{(Sylvester Levay/Tom Whitlock) GMPC/Levay Music, ASCAP}
  Produced by Mike Piccirilo
6. "The System - Didn't I Blow Your Mind" (4:20)
  _{(Mic Murphy/David Frank) Science Lab Music, ASCAP}
  Produced by The System for Science Lab Productions
7. "Debbie Gibson - Red Hot" (3:55)
  _{(Deborah Gibson) Creative Bloc Music Ltd./Deborah Ann's Music, ASCAP}
  Produced by John Morales and Sergio Munzibai for Another M+M Production, Inc.
8. "War - Sin City" (3:24)
  _{(Harold Faltermeyer/Scott Wilk/Linda Never) Kileauea Musikverlag GmbH/Yellow Brick Road Music/Valevista Music, ASCAP}
  Produced by Harold Faltermeyer
