= Let the Music Play (Shannon album) =

Studio album by Shannon
- Released: February 1, 1984
- Recorded: 1983
- Genre: Freestyle; hi-NRG
- Length: 37:28
- Label: Mirage; Atco; Atlantic
- Producer: Chris Barbosa; Mark Liggett

Shannon chronology
Let the Music Play (1984)	Do You Wanna Get Away (1985)

Singles from Let the Music Play
- 1. "Let the Music Play" Released: September 19, 1983; 2. "Give Me Tonight" Released: February 1, 1984; 3. "My Heart's Divided" Released: March 31, 1984; 4. "Sweet Somebody" Released: July 1984

Professional ratings
Review scores
Source	Rating
AllMusic	4/5 stars
Robert Christgau	B

Let the Music Play is the debut studio album by American dance and freestyle singer Shannon. The title track (originally called "Fire and Ice"), written by the team of Chris Barbosa and Ed Chisolm, became a big hit, peaking at number 8 on the Billboard Hot 100, and number 1 on the Billboard dance chart. The album itself would go on to sell over one million copies worldwide. The album garnered Shannon her first Grammy Award nomination for Best Female R&B Vocal Performance, presented at the 27th Annual Grammy Awards in 1985.

== Track listing ==
Original
No.	Title	Lyrics	Length
1.	"Let the Music Play"	Chris Barbosa; Ed Chisolm	3:34
2.	"Sweet Somebody"	Ann Godwin; Curtis Josephs; Rob Kilgore	4:41
3.	"Someone Waiting Home" (featuring Herley Johnson Jr)	Ann Godwin; Curtis Josephs	4:35
4.	"Give Me Tonight"	Chris Barbosa; Ed Chisolm	6:05
5.	"My Heart's Divided"	Ann Godwin; Chris Barbosa	4:27
6.	"It's You"	Arnie Roman; Margee Forman	4:02
7.	"One Man"	Arnie Roman; Margee Forman	3:45
8.	"Let the Music Play" (Re-mix)	Chris Barbosa; Ed Chisolm	6:03
Total length:			37:28

2006 CD reissue bonus tracks
No.	Title	Lyrics	Length
9.	"Sweet Somebody" (Special extended version)	Ann Godwin; Curtis Josephs; Rob Kilgore	6:00
10.	"Give Me Tonight" (7-inch version)	Chris Barbosa; Ed Chisolm	3:53
11.	"Let the Music Play" (12-inch version)	Chris Barbosa; Ed Chisolm	5:45
12.	"My Heart's Divided" (Remix)	Ann Godwin; Chris Barbosa	4:55
13.	"Sweet Somebody" (Dub version)	Ann Godwin; Curtis Josephs; Rob Kilgore	5:16
14.	"Give Me Tonight" (Dub version)	Chris Barbosa; Ed Chisolm	6:08
15.	"Let the Music Play" (Dub version)	Chris Barbosa; Ed Chisolm	6:11

== Personnel ==
- Chris Barbosa, Rob Kilgore – drum programming
- Rob Kilgore – percussion
- Tony Bridges – bass
- Carl Sturken, Charlie Strut, Rob Kilgore – guitars
- Rob Kilgore, Curtis Josephs – keyboards
- Ed Palermo – saxophone

== Production ==
- Executive producer – Sergio Cossa
- Produced by Mark Liggett and Chris Barbosa
- Recorded and engineered by Frank Heller and Jay
- Mixed by Chris Barbosa and Chris Lord-Alge
- Mastered by Herb Powers Jr.

== Chart positions ==
Chart (1984)	Peak position
New Zealand Albums Chart	50
Switzerland Albums Chart	30
UK Albums Chart	52
US Billboard 200	32
US Billboard Top Black Albums	11
