= Fatal Beauty =

1987 film by Tom Holland

- Theatrical release poster
- Directed by: Tom Holland
- Written by: Hilary Henkin; Dean Riesner
- Story by: Bill Svanoe
- Produced by: Samuel Goldwyn, Jr.; Leonard Kroll
- Starring: Whoopi Goldberg; Sam Elliott; Rubén Blades; Harris Yulin; John P. Ryan; Jennifer Warren
- Cinematography: David M. Walsh
- Edited by: Don Zimmerman
- Music by: Harold Faltermeyer
- Production company: Metro-Goldwyn-Mayer
- Distributed by: MGM/UA Communications Co.
- Release date: October 30, 1987 (U.S.)
- Running time: 104 minutes
- Country: United States
- Language: English
- Box office: $12 million

Fatal Beauty is a 1987 American action comedy crime thriller film directed by Tom Holland, and starring Whoopi Goldberg as Detective Rita Rizzoli, and Sam Elliott as Mike Marshak. The screenplay was written by Hilary Henkin and Dean Riesner. The original music score was composed by Harold Faltermeyer. The film was marketed with the tagline "An earthquake is about to hit L.A. It's called Detective Rita Rizzoli."

== Plot ==
LAPD detective Rita Rizzoli stages an undercover buy of a new strain of cocaine called "Fatal Beauty" with dealer Tito Delgadillo, but ruins it by leaving to save her informant Charlene from a beating by her pimp. Delgadillo steals her money and retreats to a warehouse in Chinatown where Fatal Beauty is manufactured. Two small-time hoods, Leo Nova and Earl Skinner, storm the warehouse and kill the entire gang, unknowingly stealing a botched batch of the drug. Rita later identifies Delgadillo's body and discovers another corpse in a van labeled "Kroll Enterprises." Rizzoli asks to investigate the company's owner, Conrad Kroll, but is rebuffed by her superior, Lt. Kellerman, due to Kroll's connections in Californian politics and Rizzoli's botching of her previous drug bust.

After Charlene tells Rizzoli that the owner of the warehouse drove a Rolls Royce, she sneaks into Kroll's Beverly Hills mansion, accusing him of drug dealing. After she is ordered to leave by Kellerman, Rizzoli hears a call for assistance over the scanner involving a standoff at Charlene's house in Hollywood. She rushes to the home as a man intoxicated on Fatal Beauty emerges, fires at the police, and remains standing after getting shot due to the potency of the drugs in his system. Rizzoli discovers Charlene dead from an overdose, and after failing to resuscitate her, she learns from her young son that she bought the drugs from her new pimp, Jimmy Silver. The LAPD discovers Fatal Beauty has a 50% purity and is cut with phencyclidine, causing its users to go insane and die rapidly. Rizzoli and her partner, Detective Jiminez, track down and arrest Jimmy and his supplier, Rafael. She gets into a shootout with Nova and Skinner, but is saved by Kroll's bodyguard, Mike Marshak.

After Rizzoli recovers from a gunshot wound, Marshak convinces her to let him drive her home as Jiminez gets in a shootout with Nova. Rizzoli and Marshak discover that numerous preteen children in Rizzoli's neighborhood are dying from taking Fatal Beauty, including ten of her neighbor Zach Yeager's friends, after his mother, Cecille, gave them the drug. Rizzoli admits to Marshak that she became addicted to drugs after having a child as a teenager, but recovered after her infant child got into her stash and died. However, she later discovers that Marshak was spying on her for Kroll.

After Zack attempts suicide, Cecille informs Rizzoli that her drug dealer, Denny Mifflin, will be buying Fatal Beauty from Nova and Skinner at Kroll Plaza that night. As Rizzoli prepares to arrest Mifflin, Kroll orders Marshak and the rest of his security guards to kill Nova, Skinner, and Rizzoli. However, Marshak alerts Rizzoli to their presence in time. In a gunfight, Nova and Skinner kill most of Kroll's security guards as well as Kroll, while Rizzoli and Marshak kill Nova and Skinner. As a wounded Marshak is taken aboard an ambulance, he tells her that he will likely go to prison for his involvement in Kroll's crimes, and she assures him that she will wait for his release and kisses him.

== Cast ==
- Whoopi Goldberg as Detective Rita Rizzoli
- Sam Elliott as Mike Marshak
- Rubén Blades as Detective Carl Jimenez
- Harris Yulin as Conrad Kroll
- John P. Ryan as Lieutenant Kellerman
- Jennifer Warren as Cecile Jaeger
- Brad Dourif as Leo Nova
- Mike Jolly as Earl Skinner
- Charles Hallahan as Sergeant Getz
- M. C. Gainey as Detective Barndollar
- James LeGros as Zack Jaeger
- Celeste Yarnall as Laura
- James Smith as Charlie
- Mark Pellegrino as "Frankenstein"
- Neill Barry as Denny Miflin
- Clayton Landey as Jimmy Silver
- Ebbe Roe Smith as Marty
- Walter Robles as Clay
- Cathianne Blore as Charlene
- Steve Akahoshi as Detective Shigeta
- Larry Hankin as Jerry Murphy
- Bernie Hern as Mike Weinstein
- Cheech Marin as the bartender
- David Harris as Raphael
- Fred Asparagus as Tito Delgadillo
- Gary Carlos Cervantes as Basquel
- Emilia Avarza as Candy
- Michael Delorenzo as "Flaco"
- Rick Telles as Epifanio
- Prince Hughes as Bubba "Big Bubba"
- Michael Champion as "Buzz"

== Production ==
In May 1986, Cher was announced as star. In July 1986, John Milius was working on the script and intending to direct. Cher ended up dropping out to star in Moonstruck. By November, Tom Holland was attached as director with Whoopi Goldberg to star. MGM/UA had wanted to cast Tina Turner in the role, but Holland fought for Goldberg. Billy Dee Williams was considered for the role of Mike Marshak before Sam Elliott was cast.

Filming began on February 23, 1987, in Los Angeles. During the filming of one scene, United States Secret Service agents mistook the production for a real robbery, leading to the real Los Angeles Police Department storming the set.

Goldberg and Elliott originally filmed a sex scene, but it was cut from the film after poor reactions from test audiences. Both actors alleged that the scene had been cut because of anxieties about interracial sex, which the studio denied. The Motion Picture Association of America originally gave the film an X rating, but it was later reduced to an R rating on appeal.

Brad Dourif's performance as the villain led to Holland casting him as Chucky in Child's Play.

== Reception ==
The film was unpopular with many critics (though Roger Ebert gave it a positive review of 3 stars), some of whom considered it a rip-off of Beverly Hills Cop (which Faltermeyer also scored); others cited a lack of chemistry in the romance between Goldberg and Elliott's characters. Movie historian Leonard Maltin called it "inexcusably awful, with gratuitous violence and mind-boggling dialogue, using an anti-drug message to rationalize its excesses." On Rotten Tomatoes Fatal Beauty has an approval rating of 18% based on 17 reviews. Audiences polled by CinemaScore gave the film an average grade of "B" on an A+ to F scale.

Director Holland later admitted that Fatal Beauty was an effort to expand his range as a filmmaker beyond the horror genre, but that Fatal Beauty was a mistake. "Initially," he says today, "they planned to cast Cher as Rita. But she bowed out early on, which is what I should have done."

== Soundtrack ==
- Fatal Beauty (soundtrack)
