= Stefano Pulga =

Italian musician and producer (born 1954)

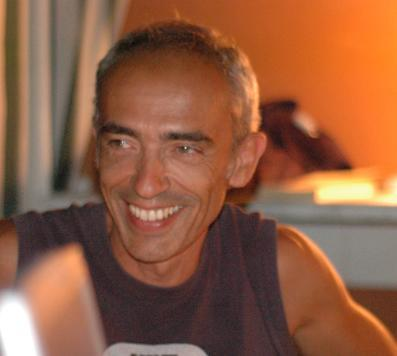
- Pulga in 2008

Background information
- Born: 14 March 1954 (age 72); Sassari, Italy
- Occupations: Composer; Singer-songwriter; Producer; Keyboardist; Arranger

Stefano Pulga (born 14 March 1954) is an Italian singer, composer, record producer, keyboardist, arranger and conductor. He is best known as one of the founding members of the Italo disco bands Kano and Pink Project.

== Life and career ==
Born in Sassari, after studying piano at the conservatory, in 1970 Pulga moved to Milan where he collaborated with several bands; in 1973 he briefly became keyboardist of Dik Dik, and one year later he joined the Lucio Battisti-produced band Flora Fauna Cemento. After debuting as a solo singer in 1975, he went on to work primarily as a keyboardist, collaborating among others with Mina, Riccardo Cocciante, Gianna Nannini, Loredana Bertè, Roberto Vecchioni, and Fiorella Mannoia.

In 1979 Pulga released his first album, Suspicion, produced by Mario Lavezzi and with lyrics by Ivano Fossati. Shortly later he founded the band Kano, and in the 1980s he founded and produced other successful Italo disco music projects, notably Pink Project. In the 1990s, he took part in two editions of the Sanremo Music Festival as a conductor. In later years, he was also active as a composer of commercial jingles and background music for television.

== Discography ==
=== Album ===
- 1979 – Suspicion
- 1982 – Indio
- 1984 – If
- 1995 – Viale dei passi perduti
- 2007 – Il cielo e la sposa
