= Firefly (band) =

Filipino/English Indie rock band

- Origin: Quezon City, Philippines
- Genres: OPM; Alternative rock
- Years active: 2002–2007, 2008–present
- Label: Galaxy Records
- Members: F/Chief Insp. Leonardo "Popoy" Sabellina Jr. FO2 Richard Erichson Mamalug; FO1 Rhoderick Herrera; Nowie Favila

Firefly is a Filipino/English Indie rock band.

== History ==
The band, whose name means Firemen Forever Love You, first jammed together during the Bureau of Fire Protection Christmas Party on December 22, 2002. The group continued to deliver their message through original songs compiled in their Langit album. It has the carrier single "Langit", which features Cesar Apolinario as the singer. It also includes the tracks "Kasama Mo Ako" featuring Rico J. Puno, "Trapik", "Kalikasan", "Sunog", "Taong Grasa", "Mr. Bell", "Hoy!", "I Love You", and "Nasaan Ka Na".

Firefly is composed of three active firefighters who recognise that they have the primary responsibility to put out fires and to promote safety awareness among Filipinos. These are F/Chief Insp. Leonardo "Popoy" Sabellina Jr. (band leader, guitarist, vocals), Fire Officer 2 Richard Erichson Malamug (lead guitar and vocals), FO1 Rhoderick Herrera (bass). They are joined by a civilian musician, Nowie Favila who shares his talent in playing drums.

After five years of performing, the band broke up in 2007, only to reunite in March 2008 for Fire Prevention Month. The group was dubbed the "Singing Firemen" in GMA-7 shows such as 24 Oras and Mel and Joey. In ABS-CBN, they were featured in the late-night show Bandila. It was at that time when the band met GMA-7 reporter and director of the award-winning film "Banal", Cesar Apolinario.

Upon learning about their advocacy, Cesar offered his services from conceptualization and scriptwriting to casting and directing-in order to create their first video Sunog.

== Members ==
=== Current members ===
- F/Chief Insp. Leonardo "Popoy" Sabellina Jr. (band leader, guitarist, vocals)
- FO2 Richard Erichson Malamug (lead guitar and vocals)
- FO1 Rhoderick Herrera (bass)
- Nowie Favila (drums)
- Paul Boardman (Maracas)

== Discography ==
=== Studio Album ===
Artist	Album	Tracks	Year	Records
Firefly	Langit	Langit; Kasama Mo Ako; Trapik; Kalikasan; Sunog; Taong Grasa; Mr. Bell; Hoy; I Love You; Nasaan Ka Na? Langit (acoustic)	2008	Galaxy Records
Firefly	Sunog	Haring Araw; Fireman's Prayer; Sunog; MNHN; ILY; Mindanao; Trapik; Taong Grasa; Nakatali Na; Tang-bin; Tuba-tuba; Bangungot	2009	Galaxy Records
