= After Party (album) =

Studio album by Adore Delano
- Released: March 11, 2016
- Recorded: 2014–2015
- Genre: Pop
- Length: 44:36
- Label: Producer Entertainment Group

Adore Delano chronology
Till Death Do Us Party (2014)	After Party (2016)	Whatever (2017)

Singles from After Party
- 1. "Dynamite" Released: February 26, 2016; 2. "Take Me There" Released: March 11, 2016; 3. "I.C.U." Released: September 1, 2016

After Party is the second studio album from American singer-songwriter and drag queen, Adore Delano. The album was released through Sidecar Records and Producer Entertainment Group on March 11, 2016. It was made available to pre-order on February 18, 2016. The album's lead single, "Dynamite" was released on February 26, 2016 with the song's music video premiering the same day.

== Promotion ==
Delano will embark on a tour to promote the release of After Party in the United Kingdom commencing on March 3, 2016 in London and concluding on March 6 in Manchester. Fans who bought VIP tickets were due to also receive their own physical copy of the album exclusively before the worldwide release, however this was later changed to receiving an exclusive signed poster.

As with her previous album, Delano starred in the North American leg of the RuPaul's Drag Race: Battle of the Seasons tour in April 2016, beginning in Seattle, Washington and concluding in New York City in May.

On the premiere episode of RuPaul's Drag Race: All Stars 2, Delano performed the song "I Can't Love You" for the judge's panel and audience.

== Critical reception ==
Professional ratings
Review scores
Source	Rating
Metro Weekly	4/5

The album received generally positive reviews from select critics, with the majority stating it was more "mature" than Delano's debut. The Star Observer called it a "solid pop extravaganza". Gordon Ashenhurst, writing for Metro Weekly, praised the album: "'After Party' is a twistedly tuneful pageant of club bangers and danceable downers. Putting the clichéd, comedy-based music of her peers in the shade, the former RuPaul’s Drag Race contestant weds together funky house music with an appetite for after-hours introspection. Every song generates its own uniquely scintillating, gutter-glam glitz. Indulging in despair at every turn, it’s an album that both explores and intensely commits itself to escape from it."

== Commercial performance ==
In the UK, After Party debuted at number 71 on the Scottish albums chart, but only made 181 on the official UK Albums Chart. The album also went to number 140 on the Belgian Flanders album chart.

In the US the album debuted at number 192 on the Billboard 200. Though a drop from Delano's first album, which peaked at number 59, After Party outpeaked it on the US Dance/Electronic chart, opening at number 1. This gave Delano her first number one on any Billboard chart.

== Singles ==
"Dynamite" was released as the album's lead single on February 26, 2016 with the official music video premiering the same day. The song explores how the effects of being sexually attracted to someone can have on a person.

On March 9, 2016, Delano uploaded a teaser trailer for "Take Me There", the second single from the album. The official music video was released on March 10, 2016.

"I.C.U." was released as the third single on September 1, 2016, along with the music video. The single was released on CD later that year.

== Track listing ==
All songs were written by Daniel Noriega and Ashley Levy and produced by Tomas Costanza and Paul Coultrup. Adore had previously stated that the album would contain 22 tracks. She later stated in an interview with Queen Magazine that she was saving half of the songs for a follow-up album, which is why the final album contains only 13 tracks.

No.	Title	Length
1.	"I.C.U."	3:02
2.	"Dynamite"	2:43
3.	"Take Me There"	3:16
4.	"Better Than the Movies"	3:07
5.	"Foreign Lover"	3:34
6.	"Bold as Love"	3:32
7.	"After Party"	4:09
8.	"I Really Like It"	2:30
9.	"Out of the Blue"	4:25
10.	"I Can't Love You"	3:17
11.	"Save Your Breath"	3:31
12.	"Constellations"	3:25
13.	"4am"	4:05

== Charts ==
Chart (2016)	Peak position
Belgian Albums (Ultratop Flanders)	140
Scottish Albums (OCC)	71
UK Albums (OCC)	181
US Billboard 200	192
US Top Dance/Electronic Albums (Billboard)	1
