= North End (band) =

American music group

- Origin: New York City, United States
- Genres: Club/Dance; Garage house Boogie
- Years active: 1979–1982
- Labels: West End; Emergency

North End was an American boogie and club music-influenced garage house music group, consisted of Arthur Baker, Russell Presto and Tony Carbone.

North End debuted in 1979 with an uptempo disco track titled "Kind of Life (Kind of Love)" which was released by West End Records. Two years later, "Happy Days" was released on Emergency Records and peaked at number 9 on the Billboard Club Play Singles chart. Madonna's "Holiday" was loosely based on "Happy Days".

Although the band didn't technically exist in 1982, all their members continued to arrange and produce Michelle Wallace's material, including "Jazzy Rhythm" and "It's Right", both written by Baker, Presto and Carbone.

== Discography ==
=== Singles ===
Year	Title	Label	Peak chart positions			
Year	Title	Label	US Hot 100	US R&B	US Dance Sales	US Dance
1979	"Kind of Life"	West End	―	―	―	18
1981	"Happy Days"	Emergency	―	―	―	9
1982	"Jazzy Rhythm"	Emergency	―	―	―	51
1982	"It's Right"	Emergency	―	―	―	13
"—" denotes releases that did not chart.
