= 24/7 Film Festival =

- Location: Sydney, New South Wales, Australia
- Founded: 2002
- Awards received: Local Government Cultural Award (2005)
- Website: http://www.247youthfilmfestival.com.au/

The 24/7 Film Festival is an annual amateur film festival in held in the Northern Beaches Council area of Sydney, New South Wales, Australia. First held in 2002, the Council-sponsored event consists of a challenge to 12- to 24-year-olds to produce a 7-minute film in 24 hours. The festival also consists of film workshops and is crowned by the showing and judging of the entries, held at various local cinemas.

In 2005 the festival won a local government cultural award for leadership in cultural programs and projects.

== Item List ==
A list of 'items' is published each year at the commencement of the competition. It is required that an item from each of the 4 categories appears in each film and that a total of at least 5 items are used. This is to ensure that films were made specifically for the competition and were made in the 24-hour period designated. The four categories are Locations, Concepts, Lines of Dialogue and Objects.

A "Secret Rule" is announced each year at the same time, placing some extra restriction on films to further ensure adherence to the time constraint. The rules for 2006 and 2007 have been to have a line of dialogue in a language other than English, and to have two characters say a line of dialogue at the same time, respectively.

== Rules ==
- All films must be made in the 24-hour period specified.
- All films must be no more than 7 minutes in length.
- All films must incorporate at least 5 of the items detailed on the official list of 12 items, including at least 1 from each category.
- All participants must be no older than 24 years and no younger than 12 years at the time of competition.
- All films must be viewable by a public audience (rating of M or less Australian Bureau of Classification).
- Any film teams partaking in unlawful or anti-social behaviour (including 'Jackass' style filmmaking) in or around the 24-hour period will be immediately disqualified.
- Participants must not incorporate copyrighted music into their films.
- The filmmakers must have the permission of all actors/extras featuring in any film.
- Only entered team members can be directly involved in the making of the film.
- Films are permitted to use superimposed text.
