= Stronger Together (song) =

Single by Shannon

from the album Do You Wanna Get Away
- Released: 1985
- Genre: Dance-pop, freestyle
- Length: 4:53 (album version)
- Label: Mirage/Emergency
- Songwriter(s): Curtis Josephs; Ed Chisolm
- Producer(s): Chris Barbosa, Mark Liggett

Shannon singles chronology
"Do You Wanna Get Away" (1985)	"Stronger Together" (1985)	"Move Mania" (1998)

Alternative cover

"Stronger Together" is the second single from freestyle singer Shannon's second album Do You Wanna Get Away.

== Track listing ==
US 12" single

No.	Title	Length
1.	"Stronger Together" (Vocal/Long LP Version)	4:57
2.	"Stronger Together" (Dub Mix)	5:03

== Charts ==
Chart (1985)	Peak Position
UK Singles Chart	46
U.S. Billboard Hot Dance Music/Club Play	25
U.S. Billboard Hot Dance Music/Maxi-Singles Sales	35
U.S. Billboard Hot Black Singles	26
