= Do You Wanna Get Away (album) =

Studio album by Shannon
- Released: May 1985
- Recorded: 1984–1985
- Genres: Post-disco; electro-funk; freestyle
- Length: 37:23
- Labels: Mirage; Atco; Atlantic
- Producers: Chris Barbosa; Mark Liggett; Russell Taylor

Shannon chronology
Let the Music Play (1984)	Do You Wanna Get Away (1985)	Love Goes All the Way (1986)

Singles from Do You Wanna Get Away
- 1. "Do You Wanna Get Away" Released: 1985; 2. "Stronger Together" Released: 1985; 3. "Urgent" Released: 1985

Professional ratings
Review scores
Source	Rating
AllMusic	3/5 stars
Robert Christgau	B−

Do You Wanna Get Away is the second studio album by American singer Shannon, released in May 1985 by Mirage, Atco and Atlantic Records.

== Track listing ==
Original
No.	Title	Writer(s)	Length
1.	"Do You Wanna Get Away"	Anne Godwin; Chris Barbosa	4:54
2.	"Doin' What You're Doin'"	Godwin; Barbosa; Ed Chisolm	4:30
3.	"Stop the Noise"	Selva Millheiser; Sunni Robbins	5:12
4.	"Stronger Together"	Chisolm; Curtis Josephs	4:53
5.	"Urgent"	Mick Jones	5:10
6.	"Why Can't We Pretend"	Bob Feldman; Sandy Farina	3:53
7.	"Let Me See Your Body Move"	Shannon; Russell Taylor	4:18
8.	"Bedroom Eyes"	Carl Sturken; Evan Rogers	4:04

2006 CD reissue bonus tracks
No.	Title	Length
9.	"Do You Wanna Get Away" (Dub Mix)	6:03
10.	"Stronger Together" (Dub Mix)	5:00
11.	"Urgent" (Dub Mix)	4:55
12.	"Stronger Together" (Radio Mix)	3:56

== Personnel ==
- Shannon – lead vocals
- April Lang, Audrey Wheeler, Cheryl Page, Cindy Mizelle, Evan Rogers, Jimi Tunnell, Selva Millheiser, Judith Spears – backing vocals
- Nate Wingfield, Carl Sturken, Charlie Street, Tommy Morrongiello, Warner Fritzshing – guitars
- Phil Ashley, Joe Norosavage, Tommy Mandel – keyboards
- C.P. Roth – keyboards, keyboard and Drum programming, percussion
- Chris Barbosa – keyboard and drum programming, percussion
- Jeff Bova – keyboards, effects
- Russell Taylor, Tony Bridges – bass
- Petey Grayson – percussion
- Miami Horn Section arranged by Crispin McCormick

== Charts ==
Chart (1985)	Peak position
U.S. Billboard 200	92
U.S. R&B Albums (Billboard)	39
