= Kano (band) =

Italian disco band formed in Milan, Italy in 1979

- Origin: Milan, Italy
- Genres: Italo disco, post-disco
- Years active: 1979–1985
- Labels: Emergency, Full Time Records, IF Records
- Past members: Luciano Ninzatti; Stefano Pulga; Matteo Bonsanto; Glen White

Kano was an Italo disco music project formed in Milan, Italy in 1979 by producers/musicians Luciano Ninzatti, Stefano Pulga and Matteo Bonsanto.

== History ==
Kano's debut single was the 1980 international hit "I'm Ready", combining elements of 1970s disco, funk and R&B while extensively using synthesizers and percussive handclaps as well as raw-processed and vocoderized vocals. Kano's self-titled debut album also included "It's a War", "Ahjia", "Now Baby Now" and the instrumental track "Cosmic Voyager". "I'm Ready" peaked at No. 1 on the U.S. Billboard Disco chart, while "It's a War" and "Ahjia" were also hits on the Hot Dance Music/Club Play chart in the U.S., reaching No. 2 for five weeks.

The band went on to record two other albums – 1981's New York Cake (which included the minor hits "She's a Star", "Don't Try to Stop Me" and "Can't Hold Back") and 1983's Another Life (including the title track and "I Need Love"). Both albums featured West Indian-born singer Glen White. Their final record was the 1985 single "This Is the Night".

== Legacy ==
"I'm Ready" was later sampled on several songs, such as Gigolo Tony's 1986 hit "Hoki Poki" and Rofo's 1983 hit "Flashlight on a Disconight". The most well-known use of it as a sample is on Tag Team's 1993 hit, "Whoomp! (There It Is)". "Now Baby Now" was sampled by house artist Felix Da Housecat for his track "Glitz Rock" which appeared on the 2001 album Kittenz and Thee Glitz. "Another Life" was remixed by Master Blaster which features on their 2003 album We Love Italo Disco. "Another Life" was also sampled in the 2003 track "Just Another Life" by Mezzomatic and the 2005 track "Discopolis" by Lifelike & Kris Menace. "Ikeya Seki" was sampled by French electro house artist Kavinsky for his track "Grand Canyon", which appeared on his 2007 EP, 1986. Finnish rapper Petri Nygård sampled "Ahjia" on his 2009 song "Kotibileet". An arpeggio from "Another Life" was sampled in the 2011 single "Reaching Out" by Nero.

"I'm Ready" was used as an intro/outro theme in the TV interstitial TV PIXxxx on WPIX-TV Channel 11 in New York City.

"Can't Hold Back" was used on the ingame radiostation Space 103.2 of the video game Grand Theft Auto V

== Discography ==
=== Albums ===
Studio albums

Year	Album	Label	US	US R&B
1980	Kano	Emergency (United States) , Full Time Records (Italy)	20	1
1981	New York Cake	Emergency (United States) , Full Time Records (Italy)	189	53
1983	Another Life	TELDEC (Germany) , Full Time (Italy)	―	―
2021	No Cents...Go Funky	Full Time (Italy)	―	―

Compilation albums

Year	Album	Label
1983	The Best of Kano	Teldec (Germany) , Full Time (Italy)
1990	Greatest Hits	Unidisc (Canada)
1993	All The Best - The Long Versions	Arcade, Mint Records (Europe)
2018	Queen Of Witches (The 12” Collection)	VR Records (Europe)

=== Singles ===
Year	Name	US	US R&B	US Dance	IT	GER	SWI
1980	"I'm Ready"	―	21	8	―	―	―
1980	"Now Baby Now"	―	―	―	―	―	―
1980	"Ahjia"	―	―	2	―	―	―
1980	"Cosmic Voyager"	―	―	―	―	―	―
1980	"It's A War"	―	―	2	―	―	―
1981	"Baby Not Tonight"	―	―	20	3	―	―
1982	"Don't Try to Stop Me"	―	―	20	―	―	―
1982	"Can't Hold Back (Your Lovin')"	89	35	20	―	―	―
1983	"Another Life"	―	―	―	23	10	8
1983	"Queen of Witches"	―	―	―	―	64	―
1983	"Baby Not Tonight"	―	―	―	29	―	8
1983	"I Need Love"	―	―	―	―	―	―
1983	"China Star"	―	―	―	―	―	―
1983	"Ikeya Seki"	―	―	―	―	―	―
1983	"This Is the Night"	―	―	―	―	―	―
