= New York Cake =

- a U.S. version of the cover.

Studio album by Kano
- Released: 1981
- Recorded: 1981, G.R.S. Studios Milano, Italy
- Genres: Italo disco; post-disco; funk; hi-NRG
- Length: 34:11 (original vinyl album) resp. 41:43 (2009 CD release)
- Labels: Full Time Records (Italy); Mirage Records (US); Emergency Records (Hong Kong, US); Funky Town Grooves (UK)
- Producers: Luciano Ninzatti, Matteo Bonsanto, Stefano Pulga

Kano chronology
Kano (1980)	New York Cake (1981)	Another Life (1983)

New York Cake is a 1981 album by Italo disco band Kano. Originally recorded for Full Time Records, it was released in the United States by Mirage Records. It was produced by Luciano Ninzatti, Matteo Bonsanto, and Stefano Pulga. The album features Italian top 3 hit "Baby Not Tonight" and American No. 89 Hit "Can't Hold Back (Your Loving)".

The album entered the Billboard 200 and Top R&B Albums charts in 1982.

In 2009 the British label Funky Town Grooves released the album in a limited edition for the first time on CD with an extended version of "Can't Hold Back (Your Loving)" as a bonus track. The album was remastered from a vinyl LP and not the original master-tapes.

"Can't Hold Back (Your Loving)" was later featured in the video game Grand Theft Auto V, but it was removed without explanation, possibly due to copyright licence expiration.

== Track listing ==
^{All songs written by L. Ninzatti, S. Pulga, Mammared, B. Addoms.}

Side A
No.	Title	Length
1.	"Can't Hold Back (Your Loving)"	4:46
2.	"She's a Star"	5:51
3.	"Baby Not Tonight"	6:58

Side B
No.	Title	Length
1.	"Party"	5:56
2.	"Round and Round"	5:00
3.	"Don't Try to Stop Me"	7:00

== Personnel ==
- Lead vocals: Glenn Wright
- Backing Vocals: Lella Esposito, Linda Wesley, Rossana Casale
- Bass guitar: Dino D'Autorio
- Bass guitar (tracks: A3, B3): Julius Farmer
- Drum kit: Flaviano Cuffari
- Drum kit: Tullio De Piscopo (tracks: A3, B3)
- Electric guitar: Luciano Ninzatti
- Keyboards: Stefano Pulga
- Percussion: Maurizio Preti
- Arrangement, songwriters: Luciano Ninzatti, Stefano Pulga

== Production ==
- Cover: Novella Massaro
- Art direction: Michelangelo Farina
- Executive producer: Luciano Ninzatti, Matteo Bonsanto, Stefano Pulga
- Associate producer: Claudio Donato
- Engineers: Bruno Malasoma, Luciano Ninzatti, Matteo Bonsanto, Stefano Pulga
- Mixing: Bruno Malasoma

== Charts ==
Chart (1981)	Peak position
US Billboard 200	189
US Top R&B Albums	53
