= Till Death Do Us Party =

Studio album by Adore Delano
- Released: June 3, 2014
- Recorded: 2014
- Length: 38:03
- Label: Sidecar; PEG

Adore Delano chronology
| Till Death Do Us Party (2014) | After Party (2016) |

Singles from Till Death Do Us Party
- 1. "D T F" Released: May 20, 2014; 2. "I Adore U" Released: June 3, 2014; 3. "Party" Released: July 1, 2014; 4. "Hello, I Love You" Released: August 1, 2014; 5. "I Look Fuckin' Cool" Released: September 26, 2014; 6. "My Address Is Hollywood" Released: November 4, 2014; 7. "Jump the Gun" Released: March 10, 2015; 8. "Give Me Tonight" Released: May 19, 2015

Till Death Do Us Party is the debut studio album from American singer-songwriter and drag queen Adore Delano. The album was released through Sidecar Records in association with Producer Entertainment Group on June 3, 2014. The album was available to pre-order on May 29, 2014, and was officially released on June 3, 2014. In November 2014, Delano announced that she was working on a follow-up to Till Death Do Us Party.

== Promotion ==
In conjunction with the album, Adore appeared in an 11-episode web series, Let the Music Play, produced by World of Wonder. Each webisode details a track off of the album.

Delano has been on her worldwide "Till Death Do Us Party Tour" since shortly after the release of the album and also joined other Drag Race alum on the Battle of the Seasons Tour.

== Critical reception ==
Professional ratings
Review scores
| Source | Rating |
|---|---|
| So So Gay | 3.7/5 |
| AlbumConfessions | 4.0/5 |

The album received generally positive reviews from select critics. David Lim, writing for So So Gay, praised the album: "Till Death Do Us Party is not only an affirmation of Adore’s vocal and songwriting prowess – it also puts her forward as a strong candidate for the platinum-selling American pop sorority of Katy, Kesha, Miley and Gaga." Luis Gonzalez of AlbumConfessions wrote, "Till Death Do Us Party is a project which easily exceeds initial expectations. While most former contestant's from RuPaul's Drag Race tend to release generic material void of any vocal merit, Adore Delano proves her time on American Idol was well deserved" in his four-star review.

== Chart performance ==
In the US, the album debuted at number 59 on the Billboard 200, number 3 on the Dance/Electronic Albums chart, and number 11 on the Independent Albums chart. It became the highest-charting album amongst her peers in RuPaul's Drag Race (including RuPaul's efforts).

== Track listing ==
All tracks written by Danny Noriega and Ashley Levy, with the exception of "Give Me Tonight," originally written by Chris Barbosa and Ed Chisholm.

| No. | Title | Length |
|---|---|---|
| 1. | "Speak My Sex" | 2:52 |
| 2. | "D T F" | 3:57 |
| 3. | "Party" | 3:11 |
| 4. | "I Adore U" | 3:42 |
| 5. | "Calling All Goddesses" | 4:04 |
| 6. | "Jump the Gun" | 3:23 |
| 7. | "Give Me Tonight" | 3:59 |
| 8. | "I Look Fuckin' Cool" (featuring Alaska Thunderfuck) | 3:52 |
| 9. | "Hello, I Love You" | 3:00 |
| 10. | "The Creeps" | 2:47 |
| 11. | "My Address Is Hollywood" | 3:12 |

== Charts ==
| Chart (2014) | Peak position |
|---|---|
| US Billboard 200 | 59 |
| US Dance/Electronic Albums | 3 |
| US Independent Albums | 11 |
