= C.O.D. (musician) =

American electro musician

C.O.D. was an American electro musician (real name was Raul A. Rodriguez), who had a hit with In the Bottle, which was released on Emergency Records in 1983 and written by Gil Scott-Heron in 1974. The track reached #54 in the UK Singles Chart in May 1983.

Rodriguez was a DJ, notable for a residency at the nightclub New York-New York, and a remixer in the New York disco scene. As well as working his own projects he produced the Man Parrish hit "Hip Hop, Be Bop (Don’t Stop)." He was also a member of the pioneering electro group Interboro Rhythm Team, with Randy Klein and Vicky Germaise.

In 1985, his electro version of Frederick Knights's "Uphill (Peace of Mind)" was featured in the climactic dance-club scene in Michael Cimino's Year of the Dragon.

One of Raul's biggest remixes was of ABBA's "Lay All Your Love On Me" in 1980. Due to its popularity on the U.S. Hot Dance Club Play chart, ABBA decided to release its album version as a 12-inch single.

Raul died on 4 January 2012 as the result of a severe stroke.

== Discography ==
=== Singles ===
- 1983: "In the Bottle" (US Emergency Records EMDS 6535)
- 1983: "In the Bottle" (UK Streetwave WAVE 2)
- 1984: "Uphill (Piece of Mind)" (US Emergency Records EMDS 6545)
- 1984: "Uphill (Piece of Mind)" (UK Streetwave MKHAN 22)
