= One-Hit Wonders (American TV series) =

- Genre: Documentary
- Country of origin: United States

Original release
- Network: VH1
- Release: July 29, 2002 – present

One-Hit Wonders is a television series airing on VH1 featuring artists who were unable to get a big break into popular music. The series began airing on July 29, 2002. Originally hosted by KROQ/Los Angeles DJ Jed the Fish, his central point was that it's difficult enough for artists to have one hit, and that the real wonder is artists who continue to hit.
