= Let the Music Play (song) =

1983 single by Shannon

Single by Shannon

from the album Let the Music Play
- Released: September 19, 1983
- Recorded: 1983
- Genre: Freestyle; dance-pop; electropop; R&B
- Length: 3:34 (album version); 5:45 (12-inch version)
- Label: Mirage; ATCO; Atlantic
- Songwriters: Chris Barbosa; Ed Chisolm
- Producers: Chris Barbosa; Mark Liggett

Shannon singles chronology
"Let the Music Play" (1983)	"Give Me Tonight" (1984)

Music video
- "Let The Music Play" on YouTube

"Let the Music Play" is a song recorded by American singer Shannon and released on September 19, 1983, as both her debut single and the lead single from her 1984 debut studio album of the same name. Written by Chris Barbosa and Ed Chisolm, and produced by Barbosa and Mark Liggett, "Let the Music Play" was the first of Shannon's four number ones on the US Dance Club Songs chart, reaching the top spot in October 1983. It also became a successful crossover hit in the US, peaking at number two on the Hot R&B/Hip-Hop Songs chart (behind Patti LaBelle's "If Only You Knew") and number eight on the Billboard Hot 100 in February 1984. It was Shannon's only top 40 hit in the US.

"Let the Music Play" was ranked 43rd on the 2009 VH1 Special 100 Greatest One-Hit Wonders of the 1980s, while Rolling Stone and Billboard featured it in their lists of "200 Greatest Dance Songs of All Time" and "500 Best Pop Songs of All Time" in 2022 and 2023, respectively.

== Background and recording ==
The original version of the song was produced by Chris Barbosa and Mark Liggett. Barbosa wrote and arranged the original demo track of "Let the Music Play" with Rob Kilgore playing all instruments. It featured a series of keyboard chords and drum patterns produced by "reverb-gating" a Roland TR-808 drum machine. Specifically, a reverberation affect was added to the kick and snare drum sounds, then, a noise gate was used to shorten the length of reverberation "tail" in a way that, while not sounding like a natural acoustic reverberation, adds a synthetically propulsive feel. Further, it was one of the first tracks to sync together a TR-808 and a Roland TB-303 bassline, famous in later years as the instrument responsible for creating acid house. The TB-303 plays the bassline for the entire song; in this case, the filter is not adjusted, which was typical for acid house. This technical achievement made the production even more groundbreaking and it resulted in a unique sound, called "The Shannon Sound", which eventually became known as freestyle.

The vocal on the chorus is by session guitarist/vocalist Jimi Tunnell, who is uncredited.

== Composition ==
"Let the Music Play" is a dance-pop and freestyle song with synthesizer and drum machine-produced rim shot percussion sounds and kick-drum/snare-drum interaction. The song's tempo is 116 beats per minute and is in the key of C minor.

== Music video ==
The accompanying music video for "Let the Music Play", directed by British director Nigel Dick and released in November 1983, starts with Shannon in a dressing room applying make-up as if she is getting ready for a performance. She then proceeds to the stage of an empty theater where she proceeds to dance and sing the song. Interspersed throughout these scenes are shots of male and female dancers fashioned in dress shirts and bow ties warming up. The dancers join Shannon by the second chorus of the song and near the end, one of the dancers proceeds to take her in his arms and dance with her. The video ends with the dancers doing a choreographed routine while Shannon continues singing.

== Impact and legacy ==
American DJ, producer, remixer and songwriter Armand van Helden named "Let the Music Play" one of his "classic cuts" in 1995, adding, "A very powerful record. The first strong vocals over electro music. The first big hit that I can remember that struck me and paved the way for freestyle. Back then it was hip hop, but not considered rap." VH1 ranked the song number 24 in their list of the "100 Greatest Dance Songs" in 2000. Blender ranked it number 465 in their list of "The 500 Greatest Songs Since You Were Born" in 2005. Slant Magazine ranked it number 54 in its "100 Greatest Dance Songs" list in 2006, adding, "Alongside Madonna's 'Holiday', D.C.-born jazz vocalist Brenda Shannon Greene's 'Let the Music Play' helped redefine dance music in the anti-disco early-'80s, setting the stage for the troubled genre for the next decade. Producers Mark Liggett and Chris Barbosa, considered one of the founding fathers of Latin freestyle, merged the then-hip electro-funk sound with Latin rhythms, unwittingly creating the world's first freestyle song."

VH1 ranked the song number 42 in their "100 Greatest One-Hit Wonders of the 1980s" in 2009. ThoughtCo ranked it number nine in their list of "25 Best Dance Pop Songs of All Time" in 2018. American DJ and producer Kevin Saunderson ranked it among "The 10 Best Disco Records of All Time" in 2019, saying, "This track was on the edge of being something outside of disco. Very catchy and very hooky. When I first started experimented with DJing it was one I played over and over." Slant Magazine ranked it number nine in their ranking of "The 100 Best Dance Songs of All Time" in 2020. Rolling Stone ranked "Let the Music Play" number six in their list of "200 Greatest Dance Songs of All Time" in 2022. Billboard magazine ranked it number 417 in their "500 Best Pop Songs of All Time" in October 2023, writing, "The seductive and wildly ahead of its time club perennial that preached to girls out on the dancefloor that all they needed to get the guy they wanted was to leave it up to the DJ." In March 2025, the magazine ranked it number 63 in their list of "The 100 Best Dance Songs of All Time".

== Charts ==
=== Weekly charts ===
1983 weekly chart performance for "Let the Music Play"
Chart (1983)	Peak position
US Dance Club Songs (Billboard)	1

1984 weekly chart performance for "Let the Music Play"
Chart (1984)	Peak position
Australia (Kent Music Report)	62
Belgium (Ultratop 50 Flanders)	30
Canada Top Singles (RPM)	12
Finland (Suomen virallinen lista)	20
Italy (Musica e dischi)	15
Netherlands (Dutch Top 40)	17
Netherlands (Single Top 100)	25
New Zealand (Recorded Music NZ)	2
UK Singles (Official Charts)	14
US Billboard Hot 100	8
US Hot R&B/Hip-Hop Songs (Billboard)	2
US Cash Box Top 100	8
US Black Singles (Cash Box)	2
Venezuela (UPI)	4
West Germany (GfK)	5

2000 weekly chart performance for "Let the Music Play"
Chart (2000)	Peak position
US Dance Club Songs (Billboard)	32
US Dance Singles Sales (Billboard) "Let the Music Play" / "Give Me Tonight" (The Lost Mixes Collection)	29

2002 weekly chart performance for "Let the Music Play" (2002 remix)
Chart (2002)	Peak position
Germany (GfK)	83

2020 weekly chart performance for "Let the Music Play"
Chart (2020)	Peak position
US Dance/Electronic Digital Song Sales (Billboard)	21

=== Year-end charts ===
Year-end chart performance for "Let the Music Play"
Chart (1984)	Position
Canada Top Singles (RPM)	91
UK Singles (Gallup)	90
US Billboard Hot 100	49
US Dance Club Songs (Billboard)	15
US Hot R&B/Hip-Hop Songs (Billboard)	9
US Cash Box Top 100 Singles	68
US Black Singles (Cash Box)	11
West Germany (Official German Charts)	58

== Certifications ==
Certifications for "Let the Music Play"
Region	Certification	Certified units/sales
United States (RIAA)	Gold	1,000,000^{^}
^{^} Shipments figures based on certification alone.

== Mary Kiani version ==
"Let the Music Play"

Single by Mary Kiani

from the album Long Hard Funky Dreams
- Released: April 1, 1996
- Label: 1st Avenue, Mercury Warehouse, Leeds UK
- Songwriters: Chris Barbosa, Ed Chisolm

Mary Kiani singles chronology
"I Give It All To You / I Imagine" (1995)	"Let the Music Play" (1996)	"100%" (1996)

In 1996, Mary Kiani covered "Let the Music Play" as her third solo single. The song was remixed in a variety of styles, notably by Paul Oakenfold of Perfecto and Steve Rodway of Motiv8. A video of the song was also released.

=== Track listings and formats ===
These are the main formats and track listings of the single release of Mary Kiani's "Let the Music Play".

#	Title	Length
UK CD single MERCD456
1.	"Let the Music Play" [Radio Mix]	3:50
2.	"Let the Music Play" [Perfecto Radio Mix]	5:40
3.	"Let the Music Play" [Motiv8 Club Mix]	6:32
4.	"Let the Music Play" [Mr. Spring Contrary Mary Mix]	5:34
5.	"Let the Music Play" [Perfecto Vocal Mix]	8:00
6.	"Let the Music Play" [Argonauts Kiani Do This Mix]	5:42
7.	"Let the Music Play" [Mr. Spring Club Edit]	4:29
UK 12" MERX456
A1.	"Let the Music Play" [Motiv8 Club Mix]	6:33
A2.	"Let the Music Play" [Union Jack Mix]	6:27
B1.	"Let the Music Play" [Perfecto Vocal Mix]	8:01
B2.	"Let the Music Play" [Perfecto Dub Mix]	5:00
UK 12" MERX457 / Fubar12
A1.	"Let the Music Play" [Casio Brothers Mix]	
A2.	"Let the Music Play" [George Bowie Mix]	
B1.	"Let the Music Play" [Steve Kerr Mix]	
B2.	"Let the Music Play" [Tom Wilson & David Livingston Mix]	

== Cover versions ==
- The soundtrack of Neil Jordan's film The Crying Game, released in 1992, includes a cover by Carroll Thompson, produced by Pet Shop Boys.
- In 1996, Scottish singer Mary Kiani covered the song. It reached the #19 spot on the UK Singles Chart.
- Mexican pop group RBD recorded a cover version for the 2007 Japanese edition of their first English-language studio album Rebels (2006).
