= Adore Delano =

American drag performer and recording artist (born 1989)

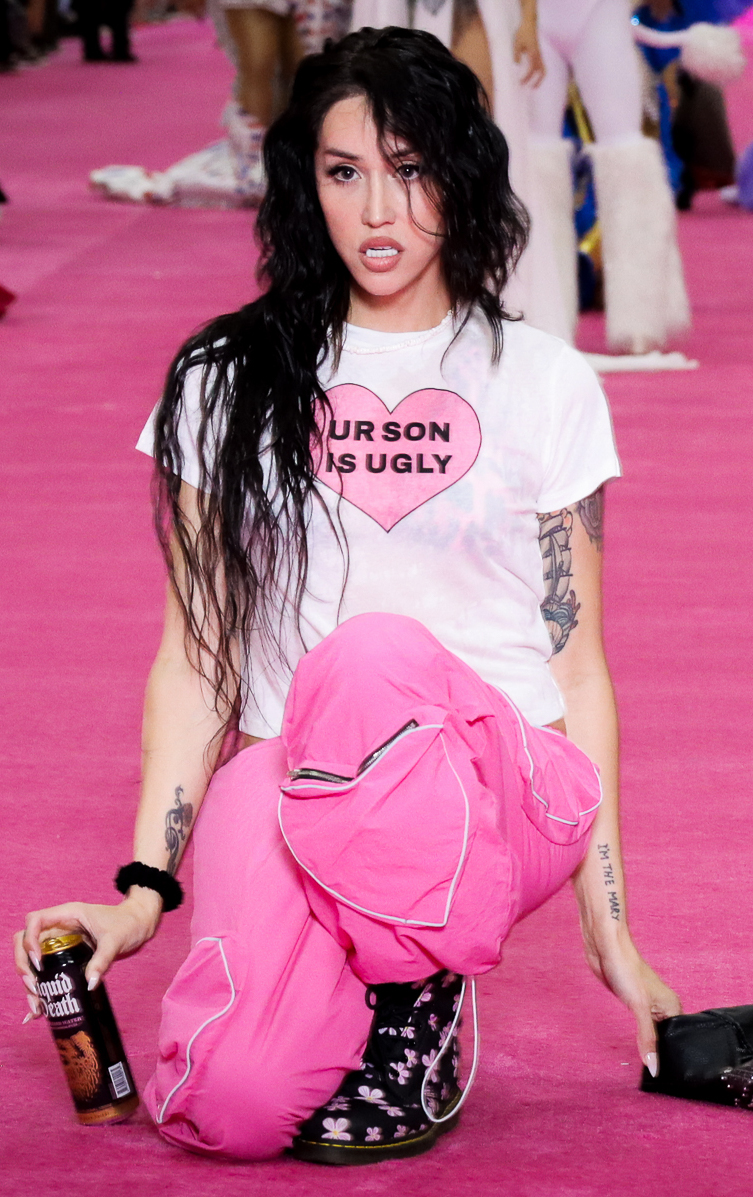
- Adore Delano at DragCon 2024
- Born: September 29, 1989 (age 37); Glendora, California, U.S.
- Occupations: Drag queen; singer; actress
- Years active: 2007–present

YouTube information
- Channel: Adore Delano
- Years active: 2009–2022
- Genre: Music
- Subscribers: 519,000
- Views: 87 million
- Last updated: 22 April 2025
- Website: adoredelano.com

Adore Delano (formerly Dani Noriega; born September 29, 1989) is an American drag queen, singer-songwriter, and television personality. She first appeared as a contestant on the seventh season of American Idol in 2008 before competing on RuPaul's Drag Race season 6 (2014) and RuPaul's Drag Race All Stars season 2 (2016). She has recorded and released three studio albums: Till Death Do Us Party (2014), After Party (2016), Whatever (2017), and one EP Dirty Laundry (2021).

== Early life ==
Delano was born in Glendora, California, on September 29, 1989, to Bonnie Pimentel Noriega. She was raised in Azusa, California, where she attended Sierra High School, a continuation school for at-risk teenagers.

== Career ==
=== Early career ===
In 2007, at age 18, Delano auditioned for the seventh season of American Idol under the name Dani Noriega. At the time, Delano had been living as a transgender woman but later said that she detransitioned in order to compete on the program.

American Idol aired from January to May 2008. Delano advanced to the semi-finals and became known for her flamboyant personality and outspoken exchanges with American Idol judge Simon Cowell.

Following her appearance on American Idol, comedian and television host Rosie O'Donnell invited Delano to perform on her R Family Vacations cruise, and comedian and talk show host Ellen DeGeneres welcomed her as a guest on The Ellen DeGeneres Show.

After American Idol, Delano built an audience on YouTube, where she posted comedy sketches and drag performances under the names Adore Delano and Angel Baby. In June 2009, she released the music video for "24/7", featuring her drag sister Diamonique.

=== RuPaul's Drag Race ===
After seeing RuPaul's Drag Race contestant Raven perform at the nightclub Micky's in West Hollywood, Delano was inspired to enter a drag competition at the club, which she won. She began performing as Adore Delano in Southern California. Along with other RuPaul's Drag Race contestants, she walked the Marco Marco runway for Los Angeles Fashion Week in 2013. In December 2013, Logo TV announced her as one of 14 drag queens who would be competing on the sixth season of RuPaul's Drag Race. She had previously competed for the season 5 fan-vote, ultimately losing to Penny Tration. Adore Delano eventually went on to win three challenges and made it to the final three. With Courtney Act, she finished as runner-up to season winner Bianca Del Rio.

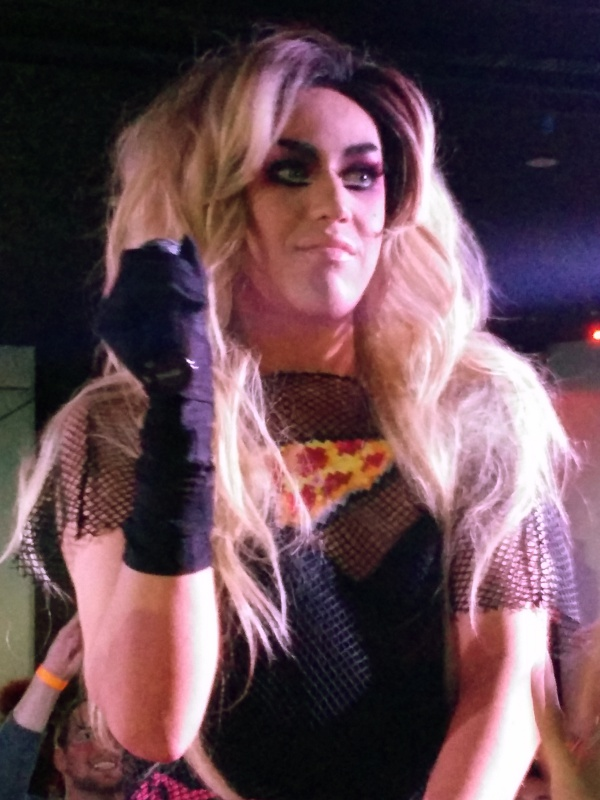
Adore Delano in 2014

Adore was one of 10 contestants on the second season of RuPaul's Drag Race: All Stars. She chose to leave the show in the second episode for personal reasons.

On April 4, 2017, Delano filed a lawsuit against Producer Entertainment Group, her former management company, alleging that Delano had earned $2.5 million over the past three years, but only about $300,000 was actually paid. P.E.G. counter-sued in January 2018, alleging Delano owed the company $180,000 in management fees. The suit was dismissed by a judge who awarded no money to either party.

In 2019, Adore Delano appeared as a guest for the first challenge in the premiere of season 11 of Drag Race. In June 2019, a panel of judges from New York magazine placed her sixth on its list of "the most powerful drag queens in America", a ranking of 100 former Drag Race contestants. In August, she was featured on the cover of Gay Times. In December 2019, she joined the cast of the fourth season of Ex on the Beach.

=== Music career ===
Following her runner-up finish on RuPaul's Drag Race in 2014, Delano launched her recording career with the single "DTF", released on May 20, 2014, as the lead single from her debut studio album, Till Death Do Us Party. Released on June 3, 2014, the album reached number three on the US Billboard Dance/Electronic Albums chart, number 11 on the US Independent Albums chart, and number 59 on the Billboard 200. Delano released music videos for most of the album's tracks, including "I Adore U", which peaked at number 49 on the US Billboard Dance/Electronic Songs chart.

In March 2016, Delano released her second studio album, After Party, preceded by the singles "Dynamite" and "Take Me There".

In 2017, Delano released her third studio album, Whatever. Marking a departure from the dance-pop sound of her earlier releases, the album incorporated punk influences. In interviews promoting the album, Delano discussed her evolving views on gender identity and artistic expression.

== Personal life ==
Delano came out as bisexual at age 12, then as gay. In a 2012 interview, she said she is not opposed to dating women. From 2017 to 2023, Delano identified as non-binary and used any pronouns. Delano said that "gender isn't a real thing ... it's just something they came up with to categorize and control people".

Delano came out as transgender in 2023. In an interview with Entertainment Weekly, she explained that after detransitioning in order to appear on American Idol, she attempted to mollify her feelings about her gender identity by living as a woman through Adore. In a coming-out video she posted to Instagram on July 26, 2023, she exclaimed that she "could not do it anymore", and revealed that she was transgender. She said that she had been taking estrogen for about three months, and that she had scheduled a gender-affirming surgery for the following November.

On December 1, 2024, Delano announced that she was in a relationship with Sasha Allen, who was a contestant on season 21 of the reality television series The Voice.

She has been sober since 2021.

== Tours ==
Headlining

- Till Death Do Us Party Tour (2014–2015)
- After Party Tour (2016–2017)
- Birthday Tour (2017)
- Whatever Tour (2018)
- Time Hop Party Tour (2018)
- A Pizza Me Tour (2019)
- The Beautiful Idiots Tour (2020)
- Dirty Laundry Tour (2021)
- Party Your World Tour (2022–2023)

Co-headlining act

- Battle of the Seasons 2015 Condragulations Tour (2015) (with RuPaul's Drag Race Cast)
- Battle of the Seasons 2016 Extravaganza Tour (2016) (with RuPaul's Drag Race Cast)
- ABCD Tour (2018) (with Bianca Del Rio, Courtney Act, and Darienne Lake)
- Heels of Hell Tour (2019)
- The Annual Halloween Sickening Ball Australia (2020)

Promotional

- After Party UK Promo Tour (2016)
- The Ghost of Ohio United Kingdom Tour – opening for Andy Black (2019)

== Awards and nominations ==
Year	Nominee / work	Award	Result	Ref.
2014	Adore Delano	Drag Queen of the Year	Won	

== Filmography ==
=== Film ===
Year	Title	Director	Role	Notes	Ref.
2015	Dragged	Christopher Birk	Self		
2015	TupiniQueens	João Monteiro	Self	Documentary about the drag queen scene in Brazil	
2025	Hag	Sam Wineman	Opal		

=== Television ===
Year	Title	Notes	Ref.
2008	American Idol		
2008	The Ellen DeGeneres Show		
2014	RuPaul's Drag Race	Season 6 – finalist	
2014	RuPaul's Drag Race: Untucked	companion show to RuPaul's Drag Race	
2015	Chasing Life		
2016	RuPaul's Drag Race: All Stars	Season 2 – 9th place	
2018	Courtney Act's Christmas Extravaganza	Channel 4 Christmas Special	
2019	The View	Interviewed with Nina West and Monét X Change	2019
2019	RuPaul's Drag Race	Guest Appearance In RuPaul's Drag Race Season 11	
2019	Ex on the Beach	Season 4: Peak of Love – contestant	
2020	KTLA 5 News	Interviewed with LaDemi	

=== Web series ===
Year	Title	Notes	Ref.
2014	Let the Music Play		
2015	Hey Qween!	Episode: "Adore Delano"	
2018	Portrait of a Queen	Episode: "Love & Adore"	
2018	Bestie$ for Ca$h	Episode: "Adore Delano and Chris Crocker"	
2018–2026	The Pit Stop	Guest; 5 episodes	
2019	The View: Facebook Live	Episode: "Pride Month 2019"	
2020	Love for the Arts	Guest judge	
2023	Sissy That Talk Show with Joseph Shepherd	Podcast; Guest	

=== Music videos ===
Title	Year	Artist	Director	Ref.
"Oh No She Better Don't"	2014	RuPaul	Steven Corfe	
"Sissy That Walk"	2014	RuPaul	Steven Corfe	
"Mean Gays"	2014	Courtney Act	Kain O'Keeffe	
"Hieeee"	2015	Alaska	Ben Simkins	
"The T"	2016	Alaska	Ben Simkins	
"You Need to Calm Down"	2019	Taylor Swift	Drew Kirsch	

=== American Idol performances ===
Stage	Theme	Song choice	Original artist	Result
Audition	Singer's Choice	"Proud Mary"	Creedence Clearwater Revival	Advanced
Hollywood	Singer's Choice	"When I Need You"	Albert Hammond	Advanced
Top 24	The 1960s	"Jailhouse Rock"	Elvis Presley	Safe
Top 20	The 1970s	"Superstar"	Delaney & Bonnie	Safe
Top 16	The 1980s	"Tainted Love"	Gloria Jones	Eliminated
