= Chris Barbosa =

American music producer (1961–2024)

Chris Barbosa (October 22, 1961 – October 18, 2024) was an American freestyle music producer from New York.

== Career ==
=== 1980s and 1990s ===
In 1983, Bronx-born Barbosa served as a reporting DJ for New York's WKTU. In this role, the radio station would contact select club and Mobile DJs (The NYC Mixologist Disco Spinners: Ralph Rivera, Nelson Cruz and Frank Forti Jr) which included Barbosa to report on popular records, which would then influence the station's playlist.

Also in 1983, an executive from Emergency Records named Sergio Cossa signed Barbosa to do production work with the record label. Some of Barbosa's musical influences were Arthur Baker and John Robie, the duo that invented electro-funk with their production of Afrika Bambaataa's "Planet Rock". Later that year, he teamed up with Mark Liggett to produce a vocal version of "Fire and Ice", the instrumental track of "Let the Music Play". They used a young contemporary R&B background vocalist named Shannon Brenda Greene, later changing her name to simply Shannon. This track was produced differently from the rest of the electro-funk records. It had a more Latin American-based rhythm with a heavy syncopated drum sound than the records produced by Baker and Robie. This style of electro funk was defined as "freestyle music" because of the way it was produced and mixed.

In September 1983, the 12-inch single of the song was released. Following the song's initial success, Shannon recorded a full-length album of the same name. The Grammy-nominated single received significant airplay on radio stations across the country. The album, released in February 1984, included another hit, "Give Me Tonight" and became the first freestyle album in dance music history. It was eventually certified gold, having sold over 500,000 copies. Both the 12-inch and 7-inch singles also achieved gold certification.

In 1984, Barbosa and Liggett sought out other session singers to lay down tracks on more freestyle songs. These artists included Nolan Thomas on "Yo Little Brother" and Xena on the song "On the Upside". Barbosa also played keyboards, programmed sequencers and produced Robin Gibb's album Secret Agent.

In 1986, Emergency Records stopped signing new artists, forcing Barbosa and Liggett to launch their own Ligosa Records. The duo immediately signed Monet and George Lamond. In addition, their subsidiary Ligosa Entertainment produced songs for upcoming freestyle music acts such as Judy Torres, Sa-Fire, and Mark Kalfa. Barbosa found chart success in 1990 with Lamond's "Bad of the Heart", which reached No. 25 on the Billboard Top 100.

In 1995, Barbosa and Liggett dismantled their company and parted ways. Barbosa continued producing for underground artists.

=== 2000s and 2010s ===
Barbosa was also affiliated with the tape editing scene. He served as the Director of Multimedia Services at Wyckoff Heights Medical Center in New York City from 2006 to 2012. In September 2011, he relocated to Orlando, Florida.

Barbosa was awarded an Ampex Golden Reel Award for "Let the Music Play".

== Personal life and death ==
Barbosa was married with two children. Barbosa was involved in various charities and organizations related to autism.

It was announced that Barbosa had died on October 18, 2024.
