= Emergency Records =

American record label

- Founded: 1979
- Country of origin: US

Emergency Records was an American independent record label from 1979 to 1989.

Founded in the United States in early 1979, Emergency Records specialized in products of the Italian disco sound of the 1970s and 1980s. During that time, the majority of the European production of disco music came from Germany, France, and Italy. Releases introduced electric instruments such as computers and synthesizers.

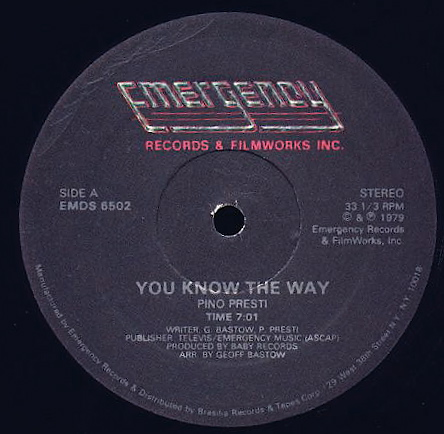
Emergency Records "Black label"

During 1981 and 1982 the label released productions that mixed late disco emotions with heavy funky rhythms that made the Emergency Sound.

As with many independent labels, in 1983 the label was looking for some hits of the dance music genre, and released early electro tracks such as "In the Bottle", "On the Upside" and "Let the Music Play". The international success of "Let The Music Play" allowed Emergency to continue until 1988. In 1987 Emergency Records signed a deal with Profile Records for distribution, which was canceled after two years. In 1989 the company closed down. Its back catalogs were sold to Unidisc Music, with its vinyl recordings considered of interest to serious collectors.

== Artists ==
12" singles.

- La Bionda
- Pino Presti
- Billy Moore
- Fear Of Falling
- Kano
- Vivien Vee
- Firefly
- North End featuring Michelle Wallace
- Lisa Fischer
- Shannon
- C.O.D.
- Nolan Thomas
- Amii Stewart featuring Mike Francis
- Sandy Marton

== See also ==
- List of record labels
