= No End in Sight: The Very Best of Foreigner =

Greatest hits album by Foreigner
- Released: July 15, 2008
- Recorded: 1976–2008
- Genre: Rock, hard rock, pop rock
- Label: Atlantic, Rhino

Foreigner chronology
The Definitive Collection (2006)	No End in Sight: The Very Best of Foreigner (2008)	Can't Slow Down (2009)

Professional ratings
Review scores
Source	Rating
Allmusic	4/5 stars
Blender	3.5/5 stars

No End in Sight: The Very Best of Foreigner is a greatest hits album that was released on July 15, 2008 by the rock band Foreigner. Aside from the classic hits, in their original versions, the album contains a brand new track, "Too Late", as well as live renditions of "Say You Will", "Starrider", and "Juke Box Hero/Whole Lotta Love" performed by the current line-up, featuring singer Kelly Hansen.

== Track listing ==
All songs written by Mick Jones and Lou Gramm except where noted.

Disc one
No.	Title	Writer(s)	Original album	Length
1.	"Feels Like the First Time"	Jones	Foreigner, 1977	3:52
2.	"Long, Long Way From Home"	Jones, Gramm, Ian McDonald	Foreigner	2:55
3.	"Cold as Ice"		Foreigner	3:20
4.	"Headknocker"		Foreigner	3:01
5.	"Starrider"	Al Greenwood, Jones	Foreigner	4:01
6.	"Double Vision"		Double Vision, 1978	3:44
7.	"Blue Morning, Blue Day"		Double Vision	3:12
8.	"Hot Blooded"		Double Vision	4:27
9.	"Dirty White Boy"		Head Games, 1979	3:40
10.	"Head Games"		Head Games	3:40
11.	"Women"	Jones	Head Games	3:26
12.	"Night Life"		4, 1981	3:51
13.	"Break It Up"	Jones	4	4:15
14.	"Juke Box Hero"		4	4:22
15.	"Urgent"	Jones	4	4:30
16.	"Waiting for a Girl Like You"		4	4:49

Disc two
No.	Title	Writer(s)	Original album	Length
1.	"I Want to Know What Love Is"	Jones	Agent Provocateur, 1984	5:01
2.	"Down on Love"		Agent Provocateur	4:08
3.	"Reaction to Action"		Agent Provocateur	3:32
4.	"That Was Yesterday"		Agent Provocateur	3:50
5.	"Say You Will"		Inside Information, 1987	4:15
6.	"I Don't Want to Live Without You"	Jones	Inside Information	3:57
7.	"Can't Wait"		Inside Information	4:31
8.	"Tooth and Nail"	Gramm, Jones	Agent Provocateur	3:57
9.	"Heart Turns to Stone"		Inside Information	4:11
10.	"Lowdown and Dirty"	Jones, Johnny Edwards, Terry Thomas	Unusual Heat, 1991	4:23
11.	"I'll Fight for You"	Jones, Edwards, Thomas	Unusual Heat	6:03
12.	"Until the End of Time"	Gramm, Jones, Bruce Turgon	Mr. Moonlight, 1994/1995 (U.S.)	4:53
13.	"Too Late"	Jones, Marti Frederiksen, Oliver Leiber, Russ Irwin	New song, 2008; later appears on Can't Slow Down, 2009	3:45
14.	"Say You Will" (Live in 2008)		Previously unreleased, 2008	4:31
15.	"Starrider" (Live at the Texas Station, North Las Vegas, Nevada, November 26, 2005)	Greenwood, Jones	Extended Versions, 2006	7:04
16.	"Juke Box Hero/Whole Lotta Love" (Live at the Texas Station, North Las Vegas, Nevada, November 26, 2005)	Gramm, Jones/John Bonham, John Paul Jones, Jimmy Page, Robert Plant, Willie Dixon	Extended Versions	8:43
