= List of Foreigner band members =

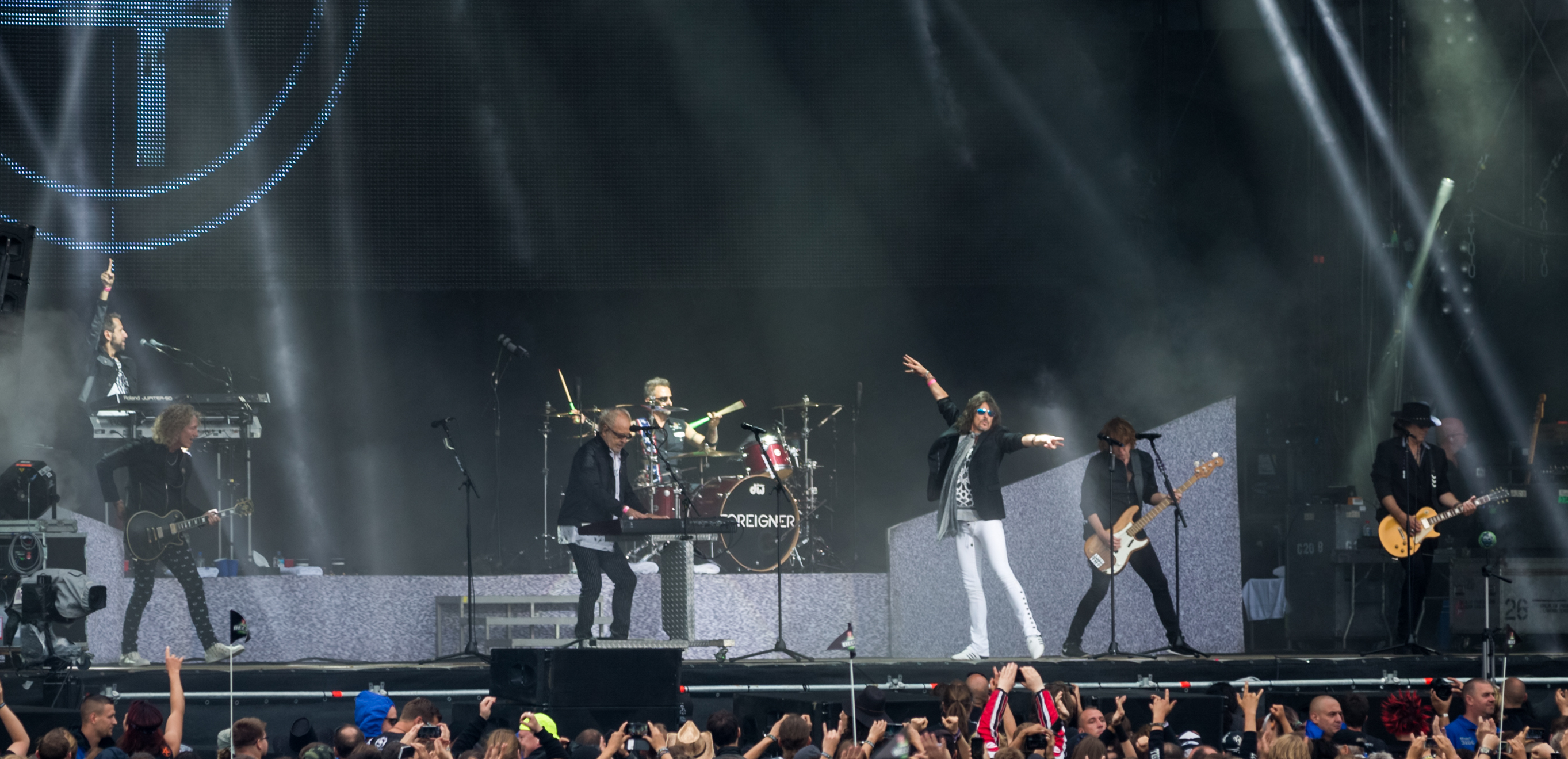
Foreigner onstage in 2016

Foreigner is an American rock band from New York City. Formed in 1976, the group originally included lead vocalist Lou Gramm, lead guitarist, keyboardist and vocalist Mick Jones, rhythm guitarist and woodwind player Ian McDonald, bassist Ed Gagliardi, drummer Dennis Elliott, and keyboardist Al Greenwood.

The band's current lineup includes Jones (the only remaining original member, however not touring), bassist and keyboardist Jeff Pilson (since 2004), keyboardist Michael Bluestein (since 2008), rhythm and lead guitarist Bruce Watson (since 2011), drummer Chris Frazier (since 2012), lead vocalist Luis Maldonado (since 2025, formerly guitarist and bassist from 2021 to 2025), and guitarist and bassist John Roth (since 2025).

== History ==
=== 1976–1995 ===
Foreigner was formed in April 1976 by former Leslie West Band guitarist Mick Jones on lead guitar, keyboards and vocals, with the original lineup also including former Black Sheep vocalist Lou Gramm on lead vocals, former King Crimson keyboardist and woodwind player Ian McDonald on rhythm guitar and woodwinds, bassist Ed Gagliardi, former Ian Hunter drummer Dennis Elliott, and keyboardist Al Greenwood. After two albums – 1977's Foreigner and 1978's Double Vision – Gagliardi left the band in April 1979 and was replaced by Rick Wills, formerly of Small Faces. Following the release and promotion of 1979's Head Games, McDonald and Greenwood were fired in September 1980. The group remained a quartet and released 4 in 1981. For the album's promotional tour, McDonald's vacated spot was taken by rhythm guitarist and woodwind player Mark Rivera, while Bob Mayo and Peter Reilich performed live keyboards. Foreigner's lineup remained the same for Agent Provocateur and Inside Information, before Gramm announced his departure from the band in May 1990 due to differences with Jones and to focus on his solo career.

Jones replaced Gramm with Johnny Edwards, formerly of Montrose, Buster Brown, King Kobra, and Wild Horses, who contributed to the group's next album, Unusual Heat. Keyboardist Jeff Jacobs joined after the album's release. The Unusual Heat touring cycle was the last for Elliott, who left the band in 1993. The drummer had ceased working with the group in 1991, with Larry Aberman filling in on tour, before Mark Schulman joined in early 1992 in time to perform on three new tracks for The Very Best ... and Beyond. The new recordings also marked the return of Gramm, who rejoined Foreigner in May 1992 after working out his differences with Jones during the Los Angeles riots; he also brought his own bassist Bruce Turgon to replace the outgoing Wills. For a tour in promotion of the compilation, Thom Gimbel joined on rhythm guitar and woodwinds, before Scott Gilman took over the following year when Gimbel returned to touring with Aerosmith. The group released and promoted its next album, Mr. Moonlight, in 1994.

=== 1995 onwards ===
After the end of the Mr. Moonlight touring cycle, Gilman left Foreigner and Gimbel returned in his place. Around the same time, in January 1995, Schulman was replaced by Ron Wikso on drums. The group continued touring, but did not release any new material before Brian Tichy replaced Wikso in April 1998. Schulman returned for a second stint in 2000, before Denny Carmassi took over in time for the group's 25th anniversary tour in 2002. After the tour ended in early 2003, Gramm and Turgon left Foreigner, and the band was put on hiatus for over a year. Jones, now the sole remaining original member of the group, reformed Foreigner for a one-off charity show in July 2004 with a lineup including Gimbel and Jacobs, plus lead vocalist Chas West, bassist Jeff Pilson and drummer Jason Bonham. Early the following year, the group reformed on a permanent basis, adding new frontman Kelly Hansen in place of West. The group's lineup remained stable until December 2007, when long-time member Jacobs left.

Jacobs was replaced for Foreigner's final shows of 2007 by Paul Mirkovich, who later made way for Michael Bluestein in early 2008. Bonham also left in August 2008, to be replaced briefly by Bryan Head and later by the returning Tichy. Foreigner released its first studio album in 15 years, Can't Slow Down, in 2009. After the subsequent touring cycle, Jason Sutter took over from Tichy in May 2010, although within a year he had been replaced by Schulman. During a tour in 2011, Jones was unable to perform a number of shows due to undisclosed reasons; he was replaced by Joel Hoekstra and later Bruce Watson for select dates, the latter of whom remained a full-time member of the group, playing lead and rhythm guitars. Schulman left again in August 2012, with Tichy filling in before Chris Frazier's arrival the next month.

In recent years, Foreigner has reunited on several occasions with numerous past members. In July 2017, Lou Gramm, Al Greenwood and Ian McDonald performed a three-song encore with the current lineup of the group. In October, the same three alumni returned to perform five songs and join the current lineup for an encore of two more, in addition to Rick Wills and Dennis Elliott. Late the following year, the reunions expanded into a series of four special shows featuring all aforementioned past members, dubbed "Double Vision: Then and Now".

In 2021, Thom Gimbel retired from the band and was replaced by former Train guitarist Luis Maldonado, playing rhythm guitar and bass, and Pilson also plays keyboards. In 2023, Foreigner started its farewell tour, with founding (and last remaining original member) Mick Jones again absent for health reasons. In May 2025, Kelly Hansen announced he would depart the band by the end of that year, having previously sat out on some legs of their farewell tour that year (Hansen will only be contributing to shows in the U.S. in 2025). Original lead singer Lou Gramm, and current guitarist and bassist Luis Maldonado rotated filling in as lead vocalist for international shows in 2025.

In November 2025, Winger and Starship guitarist and bassist John Roth was announced as new guitarist and bassist in place of Maldonado who became permanent lead singer.

== Members ==
=== Current ===
Image	Name	Years active	Instruments	Release contributions
	Mick Jones	1976–present (not touring 2011–2012, 2020–present)	lead and rhythm guitars; keyboards; backing and occasional lead vocals	all Foreigner releases
	Jeff Pilson	2004–present	bass; backing vocals; keyboards (since 2021)	all Foreigner releases from Extended Versions (2006) onwards, except Live at the Rainbow '78 (2019)
	Michael Bluestein	2008–present	keyboards; backing vocals	all Foreigner releases from Can't Slow Down (2009) onwards, except Live at the Rainbow '78 (2019)
	Bruce Watson	2011–present	lead and rhythm guitars; backing vocals	all Foreigner releases from The Best of Foreigner 4 & More (2014) onwards, except Live at the Rainbow '78 (2019)
	Chris Frazier	2012–present	drums; percussion	all Foreigner releases from The Best of Foreigner 4 & More (2014) onwards, except Live at the Rainbow '78 (2019)
	Luis Maldonado	2021–present	rhythm and lead guitars, backing vocals, and bass (2021–2025); lead vocals and additional lead guitar (2025–present)	"Urgent (Spanish version)" and "I Want to Know What Love Is (Spanish version)" (2025)
	John Roth	2025–present (touring 2025)	rhythm and lead guitars; bass; backing vocals	none

=== Former ===
Image	Name	Years active	Instruments	Release contributions
	Dennis Elliott	1976–1993 (inactive 1991–93) (plus select shows in 2013, 2015, 2017, and 2018)	drums; percussion; occasional backing vocals	all Foreigner releases from Foreigner (1977) to Unusual Heat (1991); Classic Hits Live (1993); Live at the Rainbow '78 (2019); Double Vision: Then and Now (2019)
	Lou Gramm	1976–1990; 1992–2003 (plus select shows in 2017, 2018, 2024, 2025 and 2026)	lead vocals; percussion	all Foreigner releases from Foreigner (1977) to Inside Information (1987), and from The Very Best ... and Beyond (1992) – three new studio recordings – to All Access Tonight: Live in Concert 25 (2003); Double Vision: Then and Now (2019); Live at the Rainbow '78 (2019); "Turning Back The Time" (2024)
	Ian McDonald	1976–1980 (plus select shows in 2017, 2018, and 2019) (died 2022)	rhythm and lead guitars; keyboards; saxophone; flute; backing vocals	Foreigner (1977); Double Vision (1978); Head Games (1979); Classic Hits Live (1993); Double Vision: Then and Now (2019); Live at the Rainbow '78 (2019)
	Al Greenwood	1976–1980 (plus select shows in 2017, 2018, 2019, 2023, 2024, and 2025)	keyboards; synthesizers	Foreigner (1977); Double Vision (1978); Head Games (1979); Classic Hits Live (1993); Double Vision: Then and Now (2019); Live at the Rainbow '78 (2019)
	Ed Gagliardi	1976–1979 (died 2014)	bass; backing vocals	Foreigner (1977); Double Vision (1978); Classic Hits Live (1993); Live at the Rainbow '78 (2019)
	Rick Wills	1979–1991 (plus select shows in 2015, 2017, 2018, 2019, 2021, 2023, 2024, and 2025)	bass; backing vocals	all Foreigner releases from Head Games (1979) to Classic Hits Live (1993); Double Vision: Then and Now (2019)
	Johnny Edwards	1990–1992	lead vocals; rhythm and lead guitars	Unusual Heat (1991)
	Jeff Jacobs	1991–2007	keyboards; backing vocals	The Very Best ... and Beyond (1992) – three new studio recordings; all Foreigner releases from Live at Deer Creek (1994) to Live: Soundstage (2009)
	Mark Schulman	1992–1995; 2000–2002; 2011–2012	drums; backing vocals	The Very Best ... and Beyond (1992) – three new studio recordings; Live at Deer Creek (1994); Mr. Moonlight (1994); Acoustique (2011)
	Thom Gimbel	1992–1993; 1995–2021	rhythm guitar; saxophone; flute; keyboards; backing vocals	all Foreigner releases from All Access Tonight: Live in Concert 25 (2003) to Live in Concert (2019), except Live at the Rainbow '78 (2019)
	Bruce Turgon	1992–2003	bass; backing vocals	The Very Best ... and Beyond (1992) – three new studio recordings; Live at Deer Creek (1994); Mr. Moonlight (1994); All Access Tonight: Live in Concert 25 (2003)
	Ron Wikso	1995–1998	drums	none
	Brian Tichy	1998–2000; 2008–2010 (plus fill-in shows in 2007, 2011 and 2012)	drums; percussion	Can't Slow Down (2009)
	Denny Carmassi	2002–2003	drums	All Access Tonight: Live in Concert 25 (2003)
	Jason Bonham	2004–2008	drums	all Foreigner releases from Extended Versions (2006) to Can't Slow Down (2009)
	Chas West	2004	lead vocals; percussion	none
	Kelly Hansen	2005–2025	lead vocals; percussion	all Foreigner releases from Extended Versions (2006) onwards, except Live at the Rainbow '78 (2019)
	Paul Mirkovich	2007–2008	keyboards	none
	Bryan Head	2008	drums	none
	Jason Sutter	2010–2011	drums; backing vocals	Can't Slow Down ... When It's Live! (2010)

=== Touring ===
Image	Name	Years active	Instruments	Details	Release contributions
	Ian Wallace	1977 (died 2007)	drums	Wallace performed alongside Elliott, who had broken his right hand, during select tour dates throughout 1977.	
	Mark Rivera	1981–1988; 1991–1992	rhythm guitar; saxophone; flute; keyboards; backing vocals	Rivera, Mayo and Reilich all joined the touring group in 1981, Rivera and Mayo contributed to multiple studio albums.	4 (1981); Agent Provocateur (1984); Inside Information (1987)
	Bob Mayo	1981–1988 (died 2004)	keyboards; synthesizers; piano; rhythm guitar; backing vocals	Rivera, Mayo and Reilich all joined the touring group in 1981, Rivera and Mayo contributed to multiple studio albums.	4 (1981); Agent Provocateur (1984)
	Peter Reilich	1981–1982	keyboards	Rivera, Mayo and Reilich all joined the touring group in 1981, Rivera and Mayo contributed to multiple studio albums.	none
	Larry Oakes	1988	rhythm and lead guitars; keyboards	Oakes and Cortelezzi took over from Rivera and Mayo, who were temporarily unavailable, during a tour in 1988.	
	Lou Cortelezzi	1988	saxophone	Oakes and Cortelezzi took over from Rivera and Mayo, who were temporarily unavailable, during a tour in 1988.	
	Larry Aberman	1991–1992	drums	Aberman filled in for Elliott following his departure in November 1991, before Schulman arrived the next year.	
	Scott Gilman	1993–1995	rhythm guitars; saxophone; backing vocals	Gilman replaced Gimbel after he returned to Aerosmith before moving onto his own projects, marking the return of Gimbel.	Live at Deer Creek (1994); Mr. Moonlight (1994)
	John Purdell	2000 (died 2003)	keyboards; backing vocals	Purdell, who produced several songs for the band, performed with Foreigner on the Jukebox Hero Tour 2000.	
	Doug Aldrich	2010	lead guitars; backing vocals	Aldrich performed with Foreigner on May 22, 2010, at the Mandalay Bay Events Center in Paradise, Nevada.	
	Joel Hoekstra	2011	lead guitars; backing vocals	Hoekstra filled in for Jones, unavailable due to illness, during a 2011 tour with his other group Night Ranger.	
	Ollie Marland	2012	keyboards	After taking a leave of absence due to cancer, Bluestein was temporarily replaced by Marland and then Hilland.	
	Derek Hilland	2012–2013	keyboards	After taking a leave of absence due to cancer, Bluestein was temporarily replaced by Marland and then Hilland.	
	Damon Fox	2025	rhythm and lead guitars; bass; backing vocals	Replaced Maldonado for the Latin American dates of their tour in April and May when he switched to lead vocals.	
	Geordie Brown	2025	lead vocals	Guest vocalist on one song.	

=== Session ===
Image	Name	Years active	Instruments	Release contributions
	Ian Lloyd	1976; 1977–1978; 1980–1981; 1983–1984	backing vocals	Foreigner (1977); Double Vision (1978); 4 (1981); Agent Provocateur (1984); Inside Information (1987); Unusual Heat (1991); Mr. Moonlight (1994)
	David Paich	1977–1978	string arrangements	Double Vision (1978)
	Hugh McCracken	1980–1981; 1987 (died 2013)	slide guitar; spanish guitar	4 (1981); Inside Information (1987)
	Larry Fast	1980–1981; 1983–1984	synthesizers	4 (1981); Agent Provocateur (1984)
	Thomas Dolby	1980–1981	synthesizers	4 (1981)
	Michael Fonfara	1980–1981 (died 2021)	keyboard textures	4 (1981)
	Junior Walker	1980–1981 (died 1995)	saxophone	4 (1981)
	Robert John "Mutt" Lange	1980–1981	backing vocals	4 (1981)
	Alannah Currie	1983–1984	backing vocals	Agent Provocateur (1984)
	Joe Leeway	1983–1984	backing vocals	Agent Provocateur (1984)
	Don Harper	1983–1984	backing vocals	Agent Provocateur (1984)
	Jennifer Holliday	1983–1984	backing vocals	Agent Provocateur (1984)
	New Jersey Mass Choir of the GMWA	1983–1984	backing vocals	Agent Provocateur (1984)
	Wally Badarou	1983–1984	analog and digital synthesizers	Agent Provocateur (1984)
	Brian Eddolls	1983–1984	synthesizers	Agent Provocateur (1984)
	Dave Lebolt	1983–1984	synthesizers	Agent Provocateur (1984)
	Jack Waldman	1983–1984 (died 1986)	synthesizers	Agent Provocateur (1984)
	Tom Bailey	1983–1984; 1987	synthesizers; additional keyboards; backing vocals	Agent Provocateur (1984); Inside Information (1987)
	Kevin Jones	1987	Synclavier	Inside Information (1987)
	Sammy Merendino	1987	electronic percussion	Inside Information (1987)
	Peter-John Vettese	1987	keyboards	Inside Information (1987)
	Richard Cottle	1990	keyboards	Unusual Heat (1991)
	Tommy Mandel	1990	keyboards	Unusual Heat (1991)
	Terry Thomas	1990	keyboards; guitars; backing vocals	Unusual Heat (1991)
	Tony Beard	1990	electronic percussion	Unusual Heat (1991)
	Felix Krish	1990	bass	Unusual Heat (1991)
	Rachele Cappelli	1990	backing vocals	Unusual Heat (1991)
	Angela Cappelli	1990	backing vocals	Unusual Heat (1991)
	Lani Groves	1990	backing vocals	Unusual Heat (1991)
	Vaneese Thomas	1990	backing vocals	Unusual Heat (1991)
	Tawatha Agee	1993–1994	backing vocals	Mr. Moonlight (1994)
	Robin Clark	1993–1994	backing vocals	Mr. Moonlight (1994)
	Paulette McWilliams	1993–1994	backing vocals	Mr. Moonlight (1994)
	Randy Cantor	1993–1994	keyboards; additional guitars	Mr. Moonlight (1994)
	Billy Bremner	1993–1994	additional guitars	Mr. Moonlight (1994)
	Luis Enriques	1993–1994	percussion	Mr. Moonlight (1994)
	Duane Eddy	1993–1994 (died 2024)	lead guitar	Mr. Moonlight (1994)
	Marti Frederiksen	2009	keyboards; guitars; percussion; backing vocals	Can't Slow Down (2009)
	Russ Irwin	2009	keyboards	Can't Slow Down (2009)
	Ryan Brown	2009	drums	Can't Slow Down (2009)
	Jason Paige	2009	backing vocals	Can't Slow Down (2009)
	Suzie McNeil	2009	backing vocals	Can't Slow Down (2009)

== Lineups ==
Period	Members	Releases
April 1976 – April 1979	Lou Gramm – lead vocals, percussion; Mick Jones – lead guitar, keyboards, backing and lead vocals; Ian McDonald – rhythm guitar, saxophone, flute, backing vocals; Ed Gagliardi – bass, backing vocals; Dennis Elliott – drums, percussion; Al Greenwood – keyboards, synthesizers	Foreigner (1977); Double Vision (1978); The Very Best ... and Beyond (1992); Classic Hits Live (1993); 40 (2017); Live at the Rainbow '78 (2019)
April 1979 – September 1980	Lou Gramm – lead vocals, percussion; Mick Jones – lead guitar, keyboards, backing and lead vocals; Ian McDonald – rhythm guitar, saxophone, flute, backing vocals; Dennis Elliott – drums, percussion; Al Greenwood – keyboards, synthesizers; Rick Wills – bass, backing vocals	Head Games (1979); The Very Best ... and Beyond (1992); Classic Hits Live (1993); 40 (2017)
September 1980 – May 1990	Lou Gramm – lead vocals, percussion; Mick Jones – lead and rhythm guitars, keyboards, backing vocals; Dennis Elliott – drums, percussion; Rick Wills – bass, backing vocals	4 (1981); Agent Provocateur (1984); Inside Information (1987); The Very Best ... and Beyond (1992); Classic Hits Live (1993); 40 (2017)
Summer 1990 – July 1991	Mick Jones – lead and rhythm guitars, keyboards, backing vocals; Dennis Elliott – drums, percussion; Rick Wills – bass, backing vocals; Johnny Edwards – lead vocals, rhythm and lead guitars	Unusual Heat (1991); 40 (2017)
July – November 1991	Mick Jones – lead and rhythm guitars, keyboards, backing vocals; Dennis Elliott – drums, percussion; Rick Wills – bass, backing vocals; Johnny Edwards – lead vocals, rhythm and lead guitars; Jeff Jacobs – keyboards, backing vocals	none
November 1991 – March 1992	Mick Jones – lead and rhythm guitars, keyboards, backing vocals; Rick Wills – bass, backing vocals; Johnny Edwards – lead vocals, rhythm and lead guitars; Jeff Jacobs – keyboards, backing vocals; Larry Aberman – drums (touring)	none
March – May 1992	Mick Jones – lead and rhythm guitars, keyboards, backing vocals; Rick Wills – bass, backing vocals; Johnny Edwards – lead vocals, rhythm and lead guitars; Jeff Jacobs – keyboards, backing vocals; Mark Schulman – drums, backing vocals	none
May – October 1992	Mick Jones – lead and rhythm guitars, keyboards, backing vocals; Mark Schulman – drums, backing vocals; Jeff Jacobs – keyboards, backing vocals; Lou Gramm – lead vocals, percussion; Bruce Turgon – bass, backing vocals	The Very Best ... and Beyond (1992)
October 1992 – spring 1993	Mick Jones – lead guitar, keyboards, backing vocals; Lou Gramm – lead vocals, percussion; Bruce Turgon – bass, backing vocals; Mark Schulman – drums, backing vocals; Jeff Jacobs – keyboards, backing vocals; Thom Gimbel – rhythm guitar, woodwinds, backing vocals	none
Spring 1993 – early 1995	Mick Jones – lead guitar, keyboards, backing vocals; Lou Gramm – lead vocals, percussion; Bruce Turgon – bass, backing vocals; Mark Schulman – drums, backing vocals; Jeff Jacobs – keyboards, backing vocals; Scott Gilman – rhythm guitar, woodwinds, backing vocals	Live at Deer Creek (1994); Mr. Moonlight (1994); 40 (2017)
January 1995 – April 1998	Mick Jones – lead guitar, keyboards, backing vocals; Lou Gramm – lead vocals, percussion; Bruce Turgon – bass, backing vocals; Jeff Jacobs – keyboards, backing vocals; Thom Gimbel – rhythm guitar, woodwinds, backing vocals; Ron Wikso – drums	none
April 1998 – summer 2000	Mick Jones – lead guitar, keyboards, backing vocals; Lou Gramm – lead vocals, percussion; Bruce Turgon – bass, backing vocals; Jeff Jacobs – keyboards, backing vocals; Thom Gimbel – rhythm guitar, woodwinds, backing vocals; Brian Tichy – drums	none
Summer 2000 – early 2002	Mick Jones – lead guitar, keyboards, backing vocals; Lou Gramm – lead vocals, percussion; Bruce Turgon – bass, backing vocals; Jeff Jacobs – keyboards, backing vocals; Thom Gimbel – rhythm guitar, woodwinds, backing vocals; Mark Schulman – drums, backing vocals	none
May 2002 – early 2003	Mick Jones – lead guitar, keyboards, backing vocals; Lou Gramm – lead vocals, percussion; Bruce Turgon – bass, backing vocals; Jeff Jacobs – keyboards, backing vocals; Thom Gimbel – rhythm guitar, woodwinds, backing vocals; Denny Carmassi – drums	All Access Tonight: Live in Concert 25 (2003)
Band on hiatus early 2003 – July 2004
July 2004	Mick Jones – lead guitar, keyboards, backing vocals; Jeff Jacobs – keyboards, backing vocals; Thom Gimbel – rhythm guitar, woodwinds, backing vocals; Chas West – lead vocals; Jeff Pilson – bass, backing vocals; Jason Bonham – drums	none
March 2005 – December 2007	Mick Jones – lead guitar, keyboards, backing vocals; Jeff Jacobs – keyboards, backing vocals; Thom Gimbel – rhythm guitar, woodwinds, backing vocals; Jeff Pilson – bass, backing vocals; Jason Bonham – drums; Kelly Hansen – lead vocals, percussion	Extended Versions (2006); Alive & Rockin' (2007); Live: Soundstage (2009)
December 2007 – early 2008	Mick Jones – lead guitar, keyboards, backing vocals; Thom Gimbel – rhythm guitar, woodwinds, backing vocals; Jeff Pilson – bass, backing vocals; Jason Bonham – drums; Kelly Hansen – lead vocals, percussion; Paul Mirkovich – keyboards	none
Early – August 2008	Mick Jones – lead guitar, keyboards, backing vocals; Thom Gimbel – rhythm guitar, woodwinds, backing vocals; Jeff Pilson – bass, backing vocals; Jason Bonham – drums; Kelly Hansen – lead vocals, percussion; Michael Bluestein – keyboards, backing vocals	none
August – late 2008	Mick Jones – lead guitar, keyboards, backing vocals; Thom Gimbel – rhythm guitar, woodwinds, backing vocals; Jeff Pilson – bass, backing vocals; Kelly Hansen – lead vocals, percussion; Michael Bluestein – keyboards, backing vocals; Bryan Head – drums	none
Late 2008 – May 2010	Mick Jones – lead guitar, keyboards, backing vocals; Thom Gimbel – rhythm guitar, woodwinds, backing vocals; Jeff Pilson – bass, backing vocals; Kelly Hansen – lead vocals, percussion; Michael Bluestein – keyboards, backing vocals; Brian Tichy – drums	Can't Slow Down (2009); 40 (2017)
May 2010 – March 2011	Mick Jones – lead guitar, keyboards, backing vocals; Thom Gimbel – rhythm guitar, woodwinds, backing vocals; Jeff Pilson – bass, backing vocals; Kelly Hansen – lead vocals, percussion; Michael Bluestein – keyboards, backing vocals; Jason Sutter – drums, backing vocals	Can't Slow Down ... When It's Live! (2010)
March – September 2011	Mick Jones – lead guitar, keyboards, backing vocals; Thom Gimbel – rhythm guitar, woodwinds, backing vocals; Jeff Pilson – bass, backing vocals; Kelly Hansen – lead vocals, percussion; Michael Bluestein – keyboards, backing vocals; Mark Schulman – drums, backing vocals	Feels Like the First Time: Live in Chicago (2011); Acoustique (2011)
September 2011 – August 2012	Mick Jones – lead guitar, keyboards, backing vocals (not touring for health reasons); Thom Gimbel – rhythm guitar, woodwinds, backing vocals; Jeff Pilson – bass, backing vocals; Kelly Hansen – lead vocals, percussion; Michael Bluestein – keyboards, backing vocals; Mark Schulman – drums, percussion; Bruce Watson – lead guitars, backing vocals	none
September 2012 – May 2021	Mick Jones – lead guitar, keyboards, backing vocals; Thom Gimbel – rhythm guitar, woodwinds, backing vocals; Jeff Pilson – bass, backing vocals; Kelly Hansen – lead vocals, percussion; Michael Bluestein – keyboards, backing vocals; Bruce Watson – rhythm and lead guitars, backing vocals; Chris Frazier – drums, percussion	The Very Best of Foreigner 4 & More (2014); In Concert: Unplugged (2016); "The Flame Still Burns" (2016); 40 (2017); Foreigner with the 21st Century Symphony Orchestra & Chorus (2018); Live in Concert (2019)
May 2021 – May 2025	Mick Jones – lead and rhythm guitars, keyboards, backing vocals (not touring since 2020 for health reasons); Jeff Pilson – bass, backing vocals, keyboards; Kelly Hansen – lead vocals, percussion; Michael Bluestein – keyboards, backing vocals; Bruce Watson – lead and rhythm guitars, backing vocals; Chris Frazier – drums, percussion; Luis Maldonado – rhythm and lead guitars, backing vocals, bass	none
May – November 2025	Mick Jones – lead and rhythm guitars, keyboards, backing vocals (not touring); Jeff Pilson – bass, backing vocals, keyboards; Lou Gramm – lead vocals, percussion; Michael Bluestein – keyboards, backing vocals; Bruce Watson – lead and rhythm guitars, backing vocals; Chris Frazier – drums, percussion; Luis Maldonado – lead vocals, rhythm and lead guitars, bass	none
November 2025 – present	Mick Jones – lead and rhythm guitars, keyboards, backing vocals (not touring); Jeff Pilson – bass, backing vocals, keyboards; Michael Bluestein – keyboards, backing vocals; Bruce Watson – lead and rhythm guitars, backing vocals; Chris Frazier – drums, percussion; Luis Maldonado – lead vocals; John Roth – rhythm and lead guitar, backing vocals, bass	none
