= Can't Slow Down (Foreigner album) =

Studio album by Foreigner
- Released: September 29, 2009
- Recorded: 2009
- Studios: The Benjamin Hotel, New York City (New York), Poppy Studio, Burbank (California)
- Genre: Rock
- Length: 50:00 (Main album)
- Labels: Rhino (US), earMusic/Edel (EU)
- Producers: Marti Frederiksen; Mark Ronson

Foreigner chronology
Complete Greatest Hits (2002)	Can't Slow Down (2009)	Can't Slow Down ... When It's Live! (2010)

Can't Slow Down is the ninth studio album by the British-American rock band Foreigner. It is the band's only studio album with lead singer Kelly Hansen and the first with bassist Jeff Pilson and the group's first new studio album since 1994's Mr. Moonlight. In the U.S. the album was first available exclusively through Wal-Mart retailers.

The song "Too Late" had previously been featured on the group's 2008 compilation album No End in Sight: The Very Best of Foreigner.

Marti Frederiksen and guitarist Mick Jones' stepson, Mark Ronson, co-produced the album.

== Reception ==
Professional ratings
Review scores
Source	Rating
AllMusic	3.5/5 stars
BBC	(negative)
NU.nl	5/10 stars

Can't Slow Down debuted at 29 on the Billboard 200. The first two singles from the album, "When It Comes to Love" and "In Pieces" both reached the top 20 on Billboard's Adult Contemporary chart.

In 2010, it was awarded a gold certification from the Independent Music Companies Association, which indicated sales of at least 100,000 copies throughout Europe.

== Track listing ==
All tracks are written by Mick Jones, Kelly Hansen, and Marti Frederiksen, except where noted.

Disc 1
No.	Title	Writer(s)	Length
1.	"Can't Slow Down"		3:28
2.	"In Pieces"		3:53
3.	"When It Comes to Love"		3:54
4.	"Living in a Dream"		3:43
5.	"I Can't Give Up"	Jones; Hansen; Frederiksen; Steve McEwan	4:32
6.	"Ready"		3:43
7.	"Give Me a Sign"		3:52
8.	"I'll Be Home Tonight"		4:14
9.	"Too Late"	Jones; Frederiksen; Oliver Leiber; Russ Irwin	3:45
10.	"Lonely"	McEwan; Frederiksen	3:29
11.	"As Long As I Live"		3:48
12.	"Angel Tonight"		3:32
13.	"Fool for You Anyway"	Jones	4:04
Total length:			50:00

All tracks are written by Mick Jones and Lou Gramm, except where noted.

Disc 2: The Remixes
No.	Title	Writer(s)	Original album	Length
1.	"Feels Like the First Time"	Jones	Foreigner, 1977	3:54
2.	"Cold as Ice"		Foreigner	3:22
3.	"Hot Blooded"		Double Vision, 1978	4:25
4.	"Blue Morning, Blue Day"		Double Vision	3:11
5.	"Double Vision"		Double Vision	3:43
6.	"Dirty White Boy"		Head Games, 1979	3:39
7.	"Head Games"		Head Games	3:40
8.	"Juke Box Hero"		4, 1981	4:21
9.	"Urgent"	Jones	4	4:29
10.	"I Want to Know What Love Is"	Jones	Agent Provocateur, 1984	5:02

All tracks are written by Mick Jones and Lou Gramm, except where noted.

DVD: Live & More
No.	Title	Writer(s)	Original album	Length
1.	"Double Vision"		Double Vision
2.	"Head Games"		Head Games
3.	"That Was Yesterday"		Agent Provocateur
4.	"Say You Will"		Inside Information, 1987
5.	"Starrider"	Al Greenwood; Jones	Foreigner
6.	"Feels Like the First Time"	Jones	Foreigner
7.	"Urgent"	Jones	4
8.	"Juke Box Hero"		4
9.	"I Want to Know What Love Is"	Jones	Agent Provocateur
10.	"Hot Blooded"		Double Vision

== Personnel ==
Foreigner

- Kelly Hansen – lead and backing vocals
- Mick Jones – acoustic piano, lead guitar, backing vocals
- Michael Bluestein – keyboards, backing vocals
- Thom Gimbel – guitars, saxophone, backing vocals
- Jeff Pilson – bass, backing vocals
- Brian Tichy – drums, percussion
- Jason Bonham – drums on "Too Late"

Additional musicians

- Marti Frederiksen – keyboards, guitars, percussion, backing vocals
- Russ Irwin – keyboards on "Too Late"
- Ryan Brown – drums on "Lonely"
- Jason Paige – backing vocals
- Suzie McNeil – backing vocals

Production

- Producers – Marti Frederiksen and Mick Jones (Tracks 1–12); Mark Ronson (Track 13).
- Recording – Marti Frederiksen
- Additional and vocal engineer – Jason Paige
- Mixing – Anthony Focx and Marti Frederiksen
- Editing and mastering – Anthony Focx
- Art direction – Hackmart, Inc.
- Photography – Bill Bernstein

== Charts ==
Chart performance for Can't Slow Down
Chart (2009)	Peak position
Austrian Albums (Ö3 Austria)	58
German Albums (Offizielle Top 100)	16
French Albums (SNEP)	186
Swiss Albums (Schweizer Hitparade)	26
US Billboard 200	29
US Top Rock Albums (Billboard)	12

== Certifications ==
Certifications for Can't Slow Down
Region	Certification	Certified units/sales
United Kingdom (BPI)	Silver	60,000^{‡}
United States (RIAA)	Gold	500,000^{‡}
^{‡} Sales+streaming figures based on certification alone.
