= Complete Greatest Hits (Foreigner album) =

Complete Greatest Hits (US) / The Definitive (International)

Compilation album by Foreigner
- Released: May 7, 2002
- Recorded: 1977–1992: Complete Greatest Hits, 1977–1994: The Definitive
- Genre: Hard rock, rock, pop rock
- Length: Complete Greatest Hits: 72:38, The Definitive: 76:00
- Label: Atlantic, Rhino

Foreigner chronology
Mr. Moonlight (1994)	Complete Greatest Hits (US) / The Definitive (International) (2002)	Can't Slow Down (2009)

The Definitive

Professional ratings
Review scores
Source	Rating
AllMusic	4.5/5 stars

Complete Greatest Hits or The Definitive, as it is known outside the US, is a 2002 compilation album by the British-American hard rock band Foreigner. Both Complete Greatest Hits and The Definitive have 20 tracks but The Definitive has a completely different track order and some different songs to better suit the International market.

The Definitive should not be confused with The Definitive Collection, a double-disc compilation album released by Foreigner in 2006.

The liner notes are unclear as to whether the included versions are singles or album cuts. Some track lengths differ from those listed under individual Wiki entries and so may be edits of those songs.

== Track listing ==
All tracks are written by Mick Jones and Lou Gramm, unless otherwise noted.

Complete Greatest Hits
No.	Title	Writer(s)	Original Album	Length
1.	"Feels Like the First Time"	Mick Jones	Foreigner (1977)	3:13
2.	"Cold as Ice"		Foreigner	3:20
3.	"Long, Long Way from Home"	Mick Jones; Lou Gramm; Ian McDonald	Foreigner	2:51
4.	"Headknocker"		Foreigner	3:00
5.	"Hot Blooded"		Double Vision (1978)	3:04
6.	"Double Vision"		Double Vision	3:36
7.	"Blue Morning, Blue Day"		Double Vision	3:11
8.	"Dirty White Boy"		Head Games (1979)	3:39
9.	"Head Games"		Head Games	3:39
10.	"Women"	Mick Jones	Head Games	3:26
11.	"Girl on the Moon"		4 (1981)	3:53
12.	"Urgent"	Mick Jones	4	4:19
13.	"Waiting for a Girl Like You"		4	4:34
14.	"Juke Box Hero"		4	4:05
15.	"I Want to Know What Love Is"	Mick Jones	Agent Provocateur (1984)	5:00
16.	"That Was Yesterday"		Agent Provocateur	3:46
17.	"Heart Turns to Stone"		Inside Information (1987)	4:09
18.	"I Don't Want to Live Without You"	Mick Jones	Inside Information	3:57
19.	"Say You Will"		Inside Information	4:14
20.	"Soul Doctor"		The Very Best ... and Beyond (1992)	4:52
Total length:				72:38

The Definitive
No.	Title	Writer(s)	Original Album	Length
1.	"Cold as Ice"		Foreigner	3:20
2.	"Waiting for a Girl Like You"		4	4:37
3.	"I Want to Know What Love Is"	Mick Jones	Agent Provocateur	5:00
4.	"That Was Yesterday"		Agent Provocateur	3:46
5.	"Urgent"	Mick Jones	4	4:22
6.	"Say You Will"		Inside Information	4:15
7.	"Double Vision"		Double Vision	3:37
8.	"Blue Morning, Blue Day"		Double Vision	3:11
9.	"Heart Turns to Stone"		Inside Information	4:10
10.	"Feels Like the First Time"	Mick Jones	Foreigner	3:12
11.	"Long, Long Way from Home"	Lou Gramm; Mick Jones; Ian McDonald	Foreigner	2:52
12.	"I Don't Want to Live Without You"	Mick Jones	Inside Information	3:59
13.	"Starrider"	Mick Jones; Al Greenwood	Foreigner	4:02
14.	"White Lie"		Mr. Moonlight (1994)	4:15
15.	"Break it Up"	Mick Jones	4	4:15
16.	"Hot Blooded"		Double Vision	3:05
17.	"Dirty White Boy"		Head Games	3:40
18.	"Down on Love"		Agent Provocateur	4:08
19.	"Juke Box Hero"		4	4:07
20.	"Urgent" (Recorded live at the BBC)	Mick Jones	Previously unreleased	4:47
Total length:				76:00

== Charts ==
Chart (2002)	Peak position
Australian Albums (ARIA)	30
United Kingdom	3
United States (Billboard 200)	80

== Certifications ==
Region	Certification	Certified units/sales
Australia (ARIA)	Gold	35,000^{^}
United Kingdom (BPI)	Silver	60,000^{^}
United States (RIAA)	Platinum	1,000,000^{^}
^{^} Shipments figures based on certification alone.
