= Can't Slow Down ... When It's Live! =

Live album by Foreigner
- Released: November 16, 2010
- Recorded: March 16, 2010; Nashville, Tennessee + July 31, 2010; Seebronn, Baden-Württemberg (Track 8, Disc 2)
- Genre: Rock
- Label: Rhino
- Producer: Rob Dennis

Foreigner chronology
Can't Slow Down (2009)	Can't Slow Down ... When It's Live! (2010)	Acoustique (2011)

Can't Slow Down ... When It's Live! is a live album by rock band Foreigner, released in 2010. It was recorded on March 16, 2010 in Nashville, Tennessee at the Ryman Auditorium, except for the track "Can't Slow Down" which was recorded in Seebronn, Baden-Württemberg (Germany), on July 31, 2010.

== Reception ==
George Fustos of Metal Express Radio writes: "The band has never sounded better. The band members sound tighter than ever and play with an enthusiasm that just overflows onto the stage. There is an exuberance of enjoyment, passion, and showmanship second to none that just comes through on this album from beginning to end. Some of the original members are not with the band anymore, but it sounds like Foreigner of old."

== Track listing ==
=== Disc 1 ===
1. "Double Vision"
2. "Head Games"
3. "Cold as Ice"
4. "In Pieces"
5. "Blue Morning, Blue Day"
6. "Waiting for a Girl Like You"
7. "When It Comes to Love"
8. "Dirty White Boy"
9. "Starrider"

=== Disc 2 ===
1. "Feels Like the First Time"
2. "Urgent"
3. "Juke Box Hero"
4. "Long, Long Way from Home"
5. "I Want to Know What Love Is"
6. "Hot Blooded"
7. "Can't Slow Down"

== Personnel ==
Adapted from 'Foreigner - Rockin' at the Ryman' media notes

- Mick Jones - lead guitar, keys, backing vocals, lead vocal on "Starrider"
- Kelly Hansen - lead and backing vocals, percussion
- Jeff Pilson - bass, backing vocals
- Thom Gimbel - guitars, saxophone, flute, backing vocals
- Jason Sutter - drums, backing vocals
- Michael Bluestein - keyboards, backing vocals
