= Can't Slow Down =

Can't Slow Down may refer to:

- Can't Slow Down (Lionel Richie album) or its title song, 1983
- Can't Slow Down (Saves the Day album), 1998
- Can't Slow Down (Foreigner album), 2009
- "Can't Slow Down" (Hedley song), 2015
- "Can't Slow Down" (Almost Monday song), 2024
- "Can't Slow Down", by Joe Satriani from his album Flying in a Blue Dream, 1989

== See also ==
- Can't Slow Down ... When It's Live!, a 2010 live album by Foreigner
