= Complete Greatest Hits =

Complete Greatest Hits may refer to:

- Complete Greatest Hits (The Cars album), 2002
- Complete Greatest Hits (Foreigner album), 2002
- The Complete Greatest Hits (America album), 2001
- The Very Best Of (Eagles album) (released as The Complete Greatest Hits in the UK, Australia, and New Zealand), 2003
