= Slow Me Down (disambiguation) =

Slow Me Down is a 2014 album by Sara Evans.

Slow Me Down may also refer to:

- "Slow Me Down" (song), the title track from that album
- "Slow Me Down", a 2016 song from the Issues album Headspace
- "Slow Me Down", a 2017 song from the Jessie Ware album Glasshouse

== See also ==
- Slow Down (disambiguation)
