= Slow Down =

Slow Down or slowdown may refer to:

== Music ==
- Slow Down (album), by Keb' Mo', 1998

=== Songs ===
- "Slow Down" (Bobby Valentino song), 2005
- "Slow Down" (Brand Nubian song), 1991
- "Slow Down" (Douwe Bob song), representing the Netherlands at Eurovision 2016
- "Slow Down" (Lacy J. Dalton song), 1982
- "Slow Down" (Larry Williams song), 1958; covered by the Beatles, 1964
- "Slow Down" (Loose Ends song), 1986
- "Slow Down" (Selena Gomez song), 2013
- "(Ha Ha) Slow Down", by Fat Joe, 2010
- "Slow Down", by the Academy Is... from Almost Here, 2005
- "Slow Down", by Alejandro Escovedo from Real Animal, 2008
- "Slow Down", by Alicia Keys from The Diary of Alicia Keys, 2003
- "Slow Down", by Aly & AJ from Into the Rush, 2005
- "Slow Down", by Blur from Leisure, 1991
- "Slow Down", by Clyde Carson, 2012
- "Slow Down", by Dimitri Vegas & Like Mike, 2018
- "Slow Down", by Dirty Heads from Super Moon, 2019
- "Slow Down", by John Miles from Stranger in the City, 1976
- "Slow Down", by Low Roar from ross., 2019
- "Slow Down", by Estelle from Lovers Rock, 2018
- "Slow Down", by Ghostface Killah from The Big Doe Rehab, 2007
- "Slow Down", by Hoobastank from Fight or Flight, 2012
- "Slow Down", by Irene Cara from Anyone Can See, 1982
- "Slow Down", by James Marriott from No Left Brain, 2021
- "Slow Down", by Lights from Little Machines, 2014
- "Slow Down", by Lil Tjay from Destined 2 Win, 2021
- "Slow Down", by Lizzo from My Face Still Hurts from Smiling, 2025
- "Slow Down", by Nichole Nordeman from Every Mile Mattered, 2017
- "Slow Down", by Normani and Calvin Harris from Normani x Calvin Harris, 2018
- "Slow Down", by Ozzy Osbourne from Bark at the Moon, 1983
- "Slow Down", by Reel Big Fish from Monkeys for Nothin' and the Chimps for Free, 2007
- "Slow Down", by Ringo Starr from Ringo 2012, 2012
- "Slow Down", by Skip Marley with H.E.R., 2019
- "Slow Down", by Why Don't We from The Good Times and the Bad Ones, 2021
- "Slow Down", by YoungBoy Never Broke Again from The Last Slimeto, 2022
- "Slow Down (Anthem Emporium 2013)", by Showtek, 2013

== Other uses ==
- Slowdown, an industrial action
- Slow Down (unidentified sound), a sound recorded in the Pacific Ocean
- Slowdown (venue), an entertainment venue in Omaha, Nebraska, US
- Slow Down, a 2017 book by Nichole Nordeman
- The Slowdown, a 2018–2020 podcast by Tracy K. Smith
- Slow Down: The Degrowth Manifesto, a 2024 book by Kohei Saito
- Parallel slowdown, in parallel computing
- West End Slowdown, an annual charity Australian rules football game in Adelaide, South Australia

== See also ==
- Slowdown utility, software designed to make a faster computer run slower
- Can't Slow Down (disambiguation)
