= Bruce Watson (American guitarist) =

American guitarist

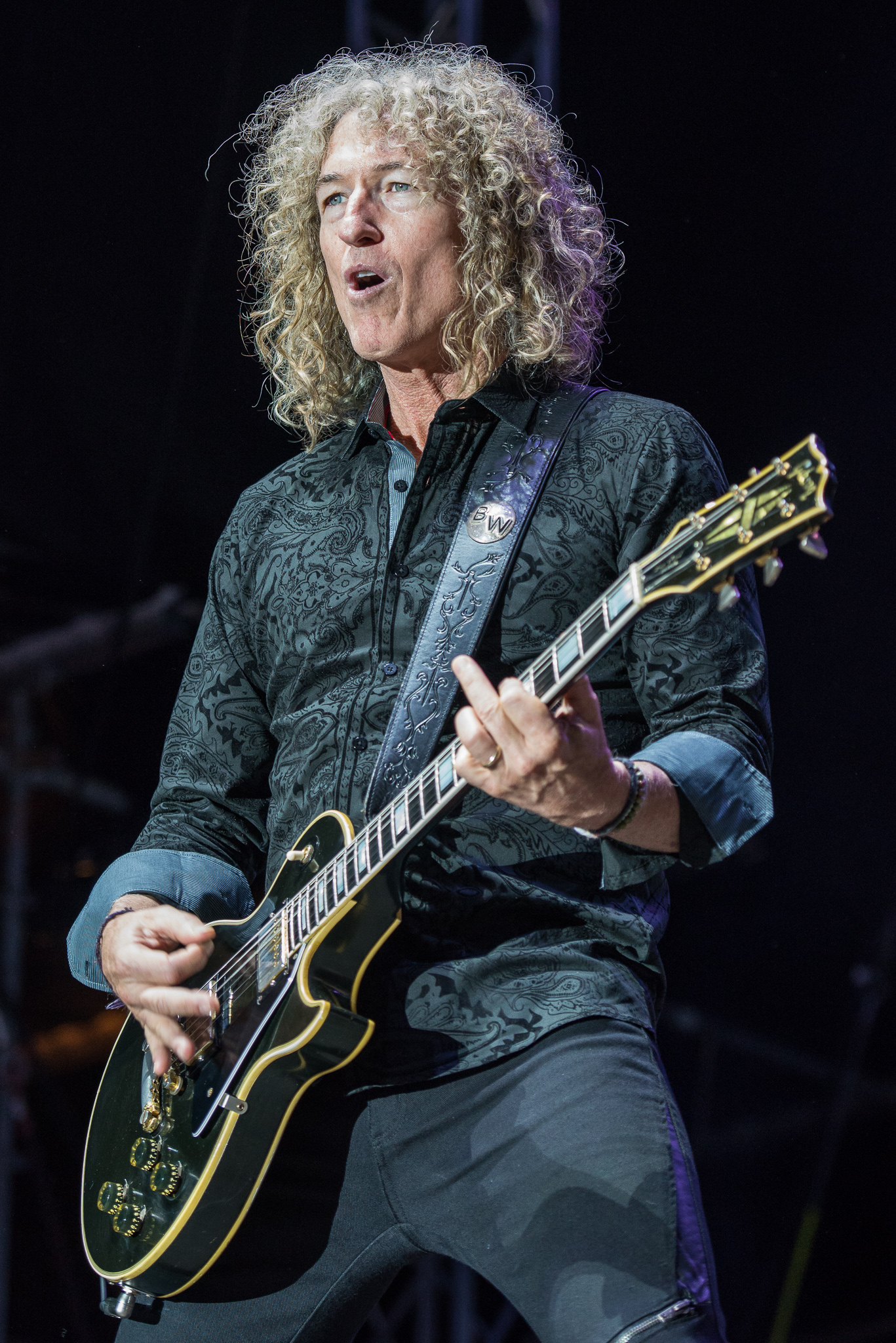
- Bruce Watson in 2016.

Background information
- Born: Bruce Watson; June 4, 1959 (age 67); Los Angeles, California, U.S.
- Genres: Hard rock; pop rock
- Occupation: Musician
- Instruments: Guitar; vocals
- Member of: Foreigner

Bruce Watson (born June 4, 1959) is an American guitarist best known for playing in the rock band Foreigner. He also sings, plays mandolin, bass guitar, and slide guitar.

== Biography ==
Watson is a third generation Los Angeles native whose love affair with rock n' roll began at the age of 10 when he heard Creedence Clearwater Revival’s "Born on the Bayou". Soon after, he convinced his father to buy him a Yamaha 12-string guitar that he played in front of his first audience, the local church group. It was not long until he discovered The Beatles, Led Zeppelin, The Allman Brothers Band, and Joni Mitchell.

In the early 1990s in Los Angeles, Bruce began recording guitar tracks for music in commercials, films & television shows, and quickly thereafter, artist sessions. Following studio and road dates with the likes of B.B. King, Patti Smyth, Rod Stewart, Elton John, and others. After graduating from Notre Dame High School in Sherman Oaks, California then earned his B.S. Degree in Business Administration from the University of Southern California. When he is asked what he listens to in his studio, he admits to “never not listening to Joni Mitchell.”

After being recommended by drummer Mark Schulman, Watson joined Foreigner full time in 2011 to play alongside founding member, guitarist Mick Jones. Watson is self taught and plays by ear. He employs improvisation while striving to achieve “that Foreigner sound” usually with a Gibson Les Paul guitar. Watson is nostalgic about his guitar collection. His childhood dream guitar was the Gibson Les Paul. At the age of 16, he saved $50/week to buy a Gibson Les Paul Gold Top guitar on lay-away. Watson's other favorites are his Fender 1968 12-string, a 1973 Fender Telecaster and his Teisco Audition made in Japan in the 1960s, a gift from composer W. G. Snuffy Walden, which he played on Sara Bareilles’ "Love Song" and the 1976 Herringbone Martin D-28 he played on Christina Aguilera's "What a Girl Wants".

Watson is a Cicerone Certified Beer Server. When touring with Foreigner he hosts V.I.B. 'Very Important Beer' meet-and-greet craft beer tastings along with Foreigner bandmate Michael Bluestein. An admitted long-time Guinness drinker, he has a passion for craft beers and for the art of brewing. Watson enjoys traveling the world tasting local and regional beers and sharing them with Foreigner fans.

== Equipment ==
When touring with Foreigner, his equipment list reads: Friedman BE-100, Matchless C-30, 70's Marshall JMP 50, multiple Gibson Les Pauls, 335s, Nash Telecasters and Stratocasters. Gold Tone resonators and Banjitar, Kentucky Mandolin, Martin backpacker, Bedell Coffeehouse Dreadnaughts and Strymon pedals.
