= Mr. Moonlight (album) =

Studio album by Foreigner
- Released: October 24, 1994
- Recorded: 1993–1994
- Studios: Pre-production - EH Recording Studio, Owned and operated by John Jackson: Criteria Studios (Miami, Florida); Emerald Studios (Nashville, Tennessee); Bearsville Studios (Bearsville, New York); Utopia Studios (Lake Hill, New York); Soundtrack Studios (New York, New York); Track Record Studios (North Hollywood, California); Studio 4 (Philadelphia, Pennsylvania)
- Genres: Pop rock; hard rock
- Length: 54:17
- Label: Arista
- Producers: Mick Jones; Lou Gramm; Mike Stone

Foreigner chronology
Best of Live (1993)	Mr. Moonlight (1994)	Complete Greatest Hits (2002)

Singles from Mr. Moonlight
- 1. "White Lie" Released: October 10, 1994; 2. "Until the End of Time" Released: March 6, 1995; 3. "All I Need to Know" Released: 1995 (Canada); 4. "Rain" Released: 1995 (Germany)

Professional ratings
Review scores
Source	Rating
AllMusic	2/5 stars
Rolling Stone	2.5/5 stars

Mr. Moonlight is the eighth studio album by British-American rock band Foreigner, released by Arista Records in Europe on 24 October and by BMG Entertainment in Japan on 23 November 1994. In the United States and Canada, it appeared in early 1995 on the Rhythm Safari/Priority label. Recorded at seven different studios across the States, the album was produced by Mick Jones, Lou Gramm, and Mike Stone, with an additional production by Phil and Joe Nicolo. It was also the first album in fifteen years without bassist Rick Wills, and founding drummer Dennis Elliott. It was both the band's last studio release until Can't Slow Down (2009) and the last to feature Gramm as lead vocalist.

Though it was intended to be a comeback release, Mr. Moonlight was a commercial disappointment, only peaking at number 136 in the Billboard 200 chart, and ranked as Foreigner's worst-selling studio album.

== Track listing ==
All tracks are written by Lou Gramm and Mick Jones, except where noted.

No.	Title	Writer(s)	Length
1.	"White Lie"		4:16
2.	"Rain"	Gramm, Jones, Bruce Turgon	4:35
3.	"Until the End of Time"	Gramm, Jones, Turgon	4:52
4.	"All I Need to Know"		4:45
5.	"Running the Risk"	Gramm, Jones, Jeff Jacobs	5:09
6.	"Real World"		6:22
7.	"Big Dog"	Gramm, Jones, Jacobs, Turgon	4:47
8.	"Hole in My Soul"		5:08
9.	"I Keep Hoping"	Gramm, Jones, Jacobs	5:10
10.	"Under the Gun"		4:16
11.	"Hand on My Heart"	Gramm, Jones, Turgon	4:57
Total length:			54:17

Japan bonus track
No.	Title	Length
12.	"Crash and Burn"	4:37
Total length:		58:54

U.S. and Canada editions
No.	Title	Writer(s)	Length
1.	"Under the Gun"		3:50
2.	"Rain"	Gramm, Jones, Turgon	4:35
3.	"Until the End of Time"	Gramm, Jones, Turgon	4:52
4.	"White Lie"		4:16
5.	"Big Dog"	Gramm, Jones, Jacobs, Turgon	4:47
6.	"Real World"		6:22
7.	"All I Need to Know"		4:45
8.	"Hole in My Soul"		5:08
9.	"I Keep Hoping"	Gramm, Jones, Jacobs	5:10
10.	"Running the Risk"	Gramm, Jones, Jacobs	5:09
11.	"Hand on My Heart"	Gramm, Jones, Turgon	4:57
Total length:			53:51

== Personnel ==
Foreigner

- Lou Gramm – lead vocals, backing vocals, percussion
- Mick Jones – guitars, acoustic piano, backing vocals
- Jeff Jacobs – acoustic piano, organ, keyboards, backing vocals
- Bruce Turgon – bass, backing vocals
- Mark Schulman – drums, backing vocals

Additional musicians

- Ian Lloyd – backing vocals
- Tawatha Agee – backing vocals (on "I Keep Hoping")
- Robin Clark – backing vocals (on "I Keep Hoping")
- Paulette McWilliams – backing vocals (on "I Keep Hoping")
- Duane Eddy – lead guitar (on "Until the End of Time")
- Billy Bremner – additional guitars (on "All I Need to Know")
- Randy Cantor – keyboards and additional guitars (on "White Lie" and "Rain")
- Luis Enriques – percussion (on "Real World" and "Running the Risk")
- Scott Gilman – saxophone, recorder, backing vocals

Production

- Mick Jones – producer
- Lou Gramm – producer
- Mike Stone – producer, engineer, mixing (at Bearsville Studios in Bearsville, New York, and Soundtrack Studios in New York, New York)
- Phil and Joe Nicolo – additional production, mixing ("White Lie" and "Rain", at Studio 4 in Philadelphia, Pennsylvania)
- David Bianco – mixing ("Real World")
- Mark Stebbeds – mixing ("Big Dog", at Track Record Studios in North Hollywood, California)
- Ted Jensen – mastering (at Sterling Studios in New York, New York)
- Danny Clinch – photography
- John Pitter – illustrations
- Red Herring Design – design

== Charts ==
Chart (1994–1995)	Peak position
Australian Albums (ARIA)	126
Canada Top Albums/CDs (RPM)	69
Dutch Albums (Album Top 100)	60
German Albums (Offizielle Top 100)	21
Japanese Albums (Oricon)	73
Swiss Albums (Schweizer Hitparade)	17
UK Albums (Official Charts)	59
US Billboard 200	136
