= I Don't Want to Live Without You =

Single by Foreigner

from the album Inside Information
- B-side: "Face To Face"
- Released: March 25, 1988 (US); May 16, 1988 (UK)
- Recorded: 1987
- Genre: Soft rock
- Length: 3:57 (single version); 4:52 (album version)
- Label: Atlantic
- Songwriter: Mick Jones
- Producers: Frank Filipetti; Mick Jones

Foreigner singles chronology
"Say You Will" (1987)	"I Don't Want to Live Without You" (1988)	"Heart Turns to Stone" (1988)

Music video
- "I Don't Want to Live Without You" on YouTube

"I Don't Want to Live Without You" is a song written by Mick Jones that was first released by the pop rock band Foreigner on their 1987 album Inside Information. Jones has rated it as one of his favorite Foreigner songs, calling it "the saddest song I ever wrote."

== Background ==
Jones said the inspiration for the song came from different people he was close to throughout his life, including women he had dated as well as his children. He also stated that around the time he wrote it, he was having a child being born, and he was determined to be there for the birth, whereas he had not been for some of his previous children.

In his autobiography, Juke Box Hero: My Five Decades in Rock 'n' Roll, lead singer Lou Gramm stated that he disliked the song and didn't want to sing it. As his personal relationship with Jones was deteriorating by that point, Gramm claims that he "under-sang" it in an attempt to sabotage Jones' song.

== Release and reception ==
Released as the follow-up single to the song "Say You Will," "I Don't Want to Live Without You" peaked at #5 on the US Billboard Hot 100 on the issue dating May 28, 1988. It remains the band's ninth and final top 10 hit, as well as their 16th and final Top 40 hit on the Billboard Hot 100 to this day. On the Billboard adult contemporary chart, the song became Foreigner's only #1 hit, spending one week atop the tally the week of May 14, 1988. The band had previously reached the Top 5 on the AC chart twice, with the songs "Waiting for a Girl Like You" (#5 in 1981) and "I Want to Know What Love Is" (#3 in 1985).

Cash Box said that "Mick Jones has fashioned a lush and emotional track for Lou Gramm's well-measured singing" and that "if you loved 'I Want to Know What Love Is' from Agent Provocateur you'll flip for this one."

== Charts ==
=== Weekly charts ===
Chart (1987–1988)	Peak position
Canada Top Singles (RPM)	16
Canada Adult Contemporary (RPM)	1
UK (OCC)	91
U.S. Top 100 (Cash Box)	8
U.S. Hot 100 (Billboard)	5
U.S. Adult Contemporary (Billboard)	1
U.S. Album Rock Tracks (Billboard)	18

=== Year-end charts ===
Chart (1988)	Position
U.S. (Cash Box)	40
United States (Billboard)	86

== See also ==
- List of Hot Adult Contemporary number ones of 1988
