= Hot Blooded =

1978 single by Foreigner

Single by Foreigner

from the album Double Vision
- B-side: "Tramontane"
- Released: June 1978 (US); October 13, 1978 (UK)
- Recorded: 1977–1978
- Genre: Hard rock, power pop
- Length: 3:03 (single version); 4:28 (album version)
- Label: Atlantic
- Songwriters: Lou Gramm, Mick Jones
- Producers: Ian McDonald, Keith Olsen, Mick Jones

Foreigner singles chronology
"Long, Long Way From Home" (1977)	"Hot Blooded" (1978)	"Double Vision" (1978)

Music video
- "Hot Blooded" on YouTube

"Hot Blooded" is a song by the British-American rock band Foreigner, from their second studio album Double Vision. It was released as a single in June 1978 and reached #3 on the Billboard Hot 100 chart that September. The single was also certified Platinum (one million units sold) by the Recording Industry Association of America. It is also the theme song to the truTV scripted series Tacoma FD.

== Background ==
Foreigner lead singer Lou Gramm has stated:

We used to work at Mick's apartment and he would just keep playing one guitar riff after another. Just playing whatever came into his mind. When he started playing that riff, I remember saying, “Wait! Stop! What’s that?” Mick said it was just another riff. So, I started singing along to it. We eventually got the idea of what the chorus would be and then started working on the verse lyrics. Once they were put together it naturally led to the “Hot Blooded” verbal line. I remember we were jumping off the walls when we cracked the title of the song.

== Lyrics and music ==
Los Angeles Times critic Robert Hilburn explained the lyrics of "Hot Blooded" as being "a macho-ish reflection of a rock star's seductive intent." According to lead singer and co-author Lou Gramm, the song is "a bit tongue-in-cheek, but really, it is a problem meeting ladies on the road. You see somebody in the audience you want to meet, but after the show, by the time you're through doing interviews and getting cleaned up, there's nobody around. You find yourself wandering around a city alone with nothing to do."

The Record critic Rick Atkinson described "Hot Blooded" as using a common rock and roll opening and chord progression but that "a carefully placed guitar line here and a fast burst of keyboards there leaves the whole melange with a new feel." St. Joseph News-Press critic Conrad Bibens described "Hot Blooded" as a "Free soundalike that lets [lead singer Lou] Gramm sing in the gruff manner of Paul Rodgers." Stereo Review critic Joel Vance stated that it "begins with a familiar chug-chug guitar figure like the one used in 1969 on "Gimme Gimme Good Lovin'," a bubblegum hit with rhythm-and-blues overtones, and both songs are about a fellow in search of fleshy fluff."

== Reception ==
Billboard described "Hot Blooded" as "a high energy rocker that boils with a feverent energy." It compared the "powerhouse" guitar playing and the vocals with Bad Company, but said the song retains Foreigner's own identifiable sound. Cash Box called it "driving, unadorned rock 'n' roll," saying that "the vocal arrangement is crisp and insistent" and the "guitars provide sinister, hard-edged power." Record World said that it "should continue [the] AOR and pop impact" Foreigner had with their debut album. Music critic Maury Dean stated that "Lou Gramm's craggy tenor spins around the note, rocking dynamite rhythms in note-bending ecstasy."

Hilburn described '"Hot Blooded" as touching on "the snarl of Bad Company, the wryness of Rod Stewart and the sensualness of the Rolling Stones" but complained the song lacked authenticity. According to Atkinson, the musicianship and arrangement make "Hot Blooded" superior to any previous song using this chord combination. San Pedro News-Pilot critic Joseph Bensoua said it has "just the right hooks, phrasing and simple lyrics needed for controlled rock 'n' roll."

In a negative review of Double Vision, Robert Christgau wrote, "I like rock and roll so much that I catch myself getting off on 'Hot Blooded,' a typical piece of cock-rock nookie-hating carried along on a riff-with-chord-change that's pure (gad) second-generation Bad Company." Billboard reviewer Gary Graff rated "Hot Blooded" Foreigner's 4th greatest song. Classic Rock History critic Brian Kachejian rated it as Foreigner's 3rd best song, particularly praising the "smoking bass line and grooving drums" and "Mick Jones’ guitar licks."

"That's a great fuckin' driving song…" enthused Slipknot front-man Corey Taylor. "I got that on Complete Greatest Hits, because I'm not gonna surf through all the filler to get to the songs I like."

== Personnel ==
- Lou Gramm – lead vocals, percussion
- Mick Jones – guitar, backing vocals, piano
- Ian McDonald – guitar, reeds, keyboards, backing vocals
- Al Greenwood – keyboards, synthesizers
- Ed Gagliardi – bass guitar, backing vocals
- Dennis Elliott – drums, backing vocals

== Chart history ==
=== Weekly charts ===
Chart (1978)	Peak position
Australia Kent Music Report	24
Canada Top Singles (RPM)	3
UK (OCC)	42
US Billboard Hot 100	3
US Cash Box Top 100	4

=== Year-end charts ===
Chart (1978)	Rank
Canada	22
US Billboard Hot 100	36
US Cash Box	26
