= Say You Will (Foreigner song) =

Single by Foreigner

from the album Inside Information
- B-side: "A Night to Remember"
- Released: November 1987
- Genre: Rock
- Length: 4:12 (album version); 3:59 (7" single version); 5:24 (12" version)
- Label: Atlantic
- Songwriters: Mick Jones and Lou Gramm
- Producers: Mick Jones and Frank Filipetti

Foreigner singles chronology
"Down on Love" (1986)	"Say You Will" (1987)	"I Don't Want to Live Without You" (1988)

Music video
- "Say You Will" on YouTube

"Say You Will" is a song by British-American rock band Foreigner. It was the first single released from the album Inside Information (1987), and was co-written by Lou Gramm and Mick Jones.

== Reception ==
The single reached No. 6 on the Billboard Hot 100 on the chart dating February 20, 1988. It also became their fourth #1 hit on the Billboard Hot Mainstream Rock Tracks chart, holding the top spot for four weeks, starting on December 19, 1987.

"Say You Will" was one of Foreigner's last two Top 10 chart hits in the United States, followed by the 1988 release of the single "I Don't Want to Live Without You" (which reached No. 5 on the Hot 100 chart). The song also became the band's third-highest-charting hit in Germany, where it reached No. 22, faring even better in Switzerland, the Netherlands, and particularly Norway, where it reached No. 4. The video clip for this song, directed by David Fincher, reached No. 1 on MTV's Top Twenty chart in February 1988.

Allmusic noted that the single was a "good example" of the band's "balancing act" as "the guitar-heavy style of their early work gave way to slick arrangements that pushed electronics to the fore...temper(ing) its rock guitar edge...and Lou Gramm's quasi-operatic vocals...by thick layers of chiming synthesizers and an array of electronic textures."

Cash Box called it a "powerful pop/rock number" with "wide demographic appeal."

It is also featured on the band's compilation 40: Forty Hits From Forty Years 1977-2017 published in 2017, in an acoustic version with Kelly Hansen on vocals as a new song.

== Track listing ==
U.S. 7" single (Atlantic – 789169-7)
No.	Title	Writer(s)	Length
1.	"Say You Will"		4:12
2.	"A Night To Remember"	Lou Gramm, Mick Jones	3:58
Total length:			7:52

== Charts ==
=== Weekly charts ===
Chart (1987–88)	Peak position
Australian Singles Chart	6
Canada Top Singles (RPM)	13
Dutch Top 40	14
German Singles Chart	22
Italy Airplay (Music & Media)	2
Norwegian Singles Chart	4
Swiss Singles Chart	20
UK Singles Chart	71
U.S. Billboard Hot 100	6
U.S. Billboard Adult Contemporary	41
U.S. Billboard Album Rock Tracks	1

=== Year-end charts ===
Chart (1988)	Position
Canada Top Singles (RPM)	98
United States (Billboard)	73

== See also ==
- List of number-one mainstream rock hits (United States)
