= Thom Gimbel =

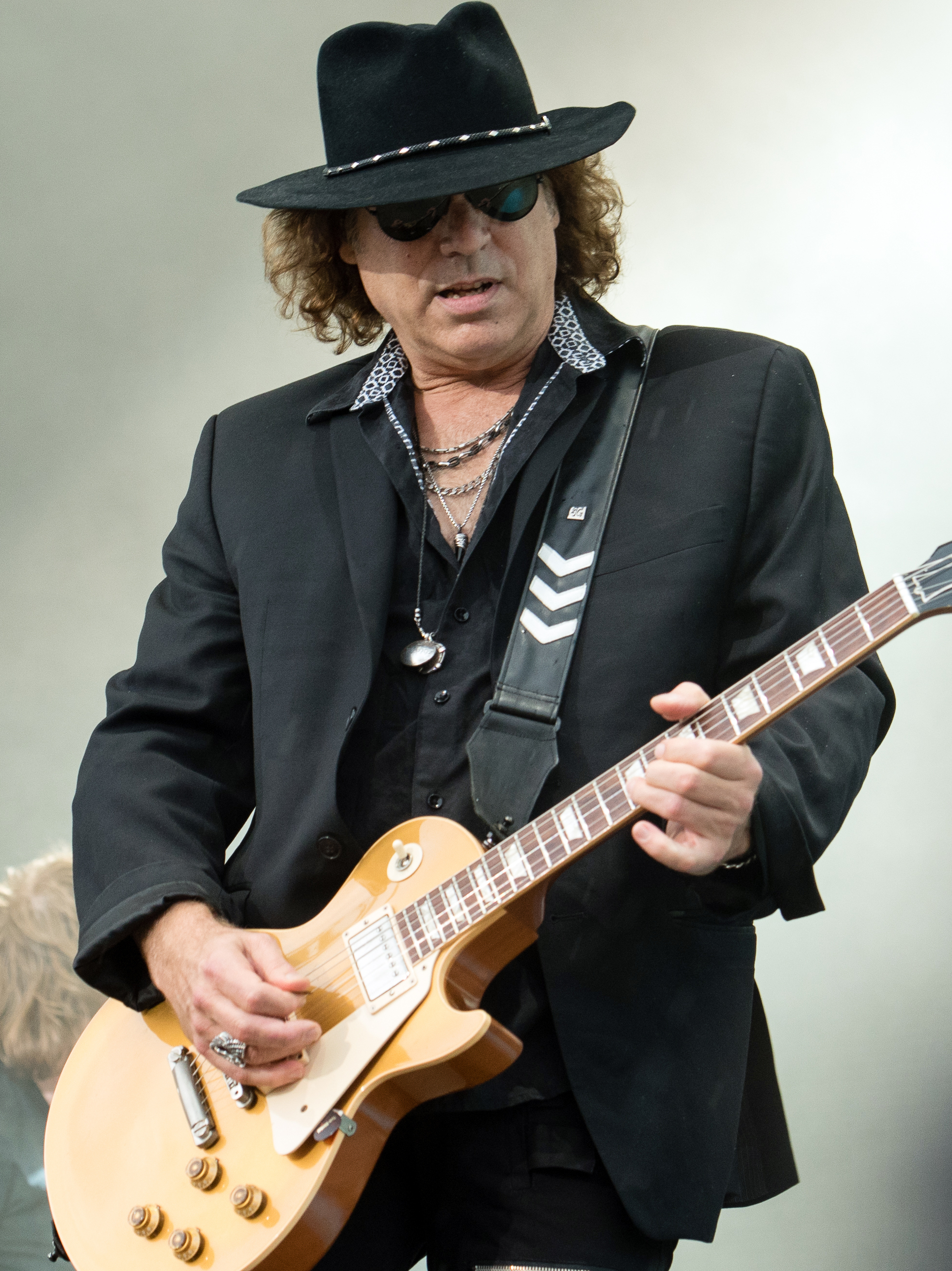
- Gimbel performing with Foreigner in 2016

Background information
- Born: November 1, 1959 (age 65); Morristown, New Jersey, U.S.
- Genres: Hard rock, heavy metal, instrumental rock
- Occupation(s): Musician, songwriter
- Instrument(s): Keyboards, guitar, saxophone, flute, vocals, percussion
- Years active: 1967–present

Thomas Ellis Gimbel (born November 1, 1959) is an American rock musician and multi-instrumentalist, best known as a member of the rock band Foreigner from 1992 to 1993 and again from 1995 to 2021.

== Early life ==
Born in Morristown, New Jersey, Gimbel started playing drums as a young child, beginning lessons in third grade. Later he got interested in the guitar. He played flute and guitar and was lead vocalist at Northfield Mount Hermon School in a band called Your Sister's A** with Matt Thurber (drums; who later played in The Rings), Travis Hudelson (drums; who later played with Rich Deans), Jim Steinwedell (lead guitar; who later played in Panzer [CA]), Steven Harriman (lead guitar), and Robert Burns (bass). In the following year, he continued to play in bands at school, applying to music schools on the east coast.

After high school, Gimbel attended the Berklee College of Music in Boston where he majored in jazz composition and arranging. Не met guitarist Jon Butcher with whom he toured the United States. He played with Butcher for four years recording three studio albums for Capitol Records. One of the songs he co-wrote with Butcher called "The Ritual" was nominated for a Grammy Award.

== Career ==
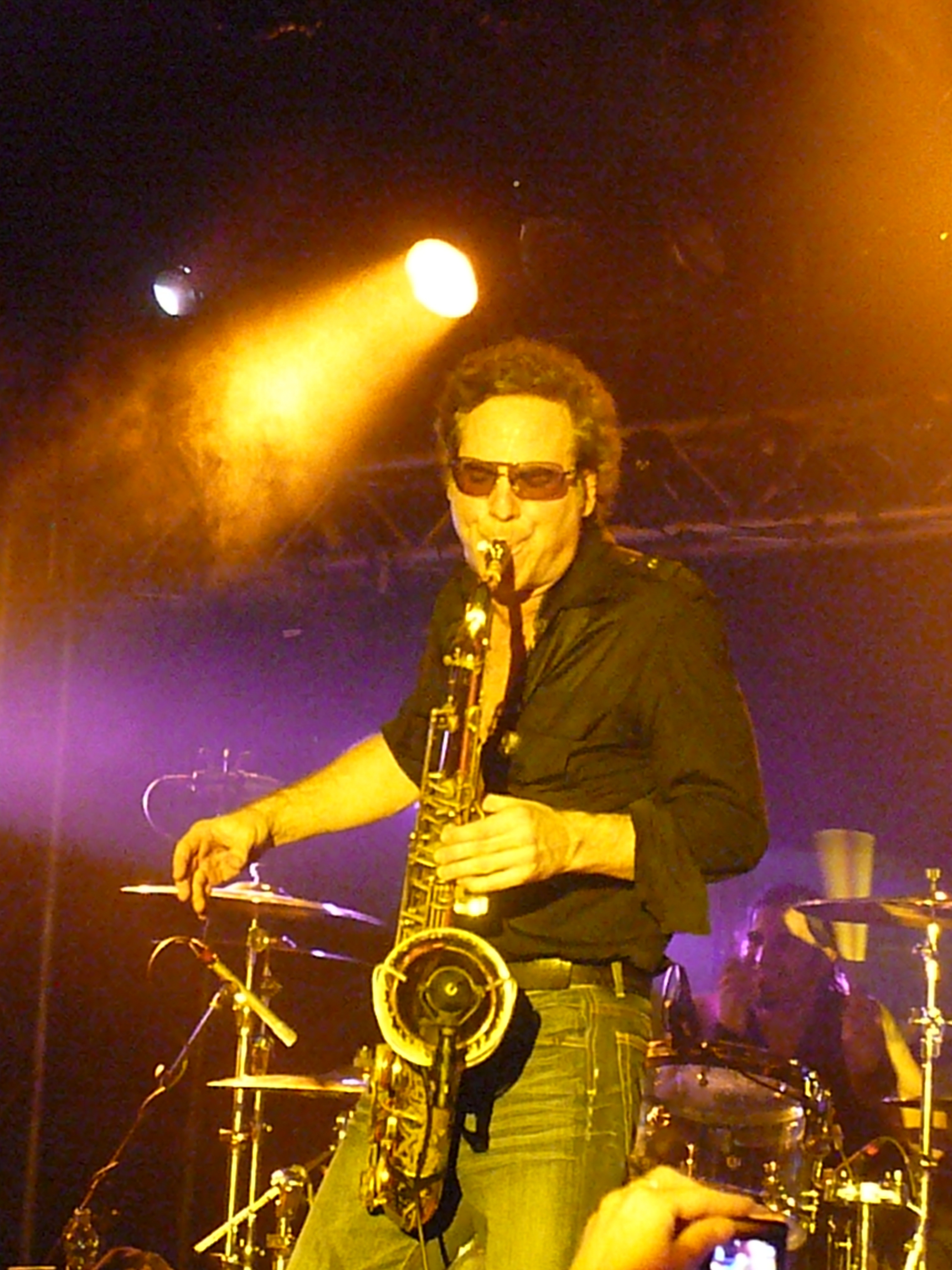
Gimbel in 2009

=== Aerosmith ===
Gimbel became a touring musician with Aerosmith from 1989 until 1995, performing keyboards, saxophone, percussion, and backing vocals. During this time, he appeared in a "Wayne's World" sketch on Saturday Night Live, and in the movie Wayne's World 2, where they performed two songs.

=== Foreigner ===
After touring with Aerosmith on the Pump Tour from 1989 to 1990, Gimbel then joined up with Foreigner in 1992. He returned to Aerosmith in 1993–1994 for the Get a Grip Tour and later rejoined Foreigner in 1995, he has remained a member of Foreigner since that time. Gimbel played rhythm guitar, saxophone, and flute, as well as keyboards and backing vocals. In March 2021, Foreigner's bassist Jeff Pilson announced Gimbel's retirement from the band.

== Personal life ==
When he is not on the road with Foreigner, Gimbel plays golf, and enjoys playing a wide variety of instruments.

He has three older brothers and sisters and is, among many others, related to the television producer and Emmy Award winner, Roger Gimbel (1925–2011).
