= Long, Long Way from Home =

"Long, Long Way From Home"

Single by Foreigner

from the album Foreigner
- B-side: "The Damage Is Done"
- Released: November 1977
- Recorded: late 1976
- Genre: Hard rock
- Length: 2:45 (single version); 2:53 (album version)
- Label: Atlantic
- Songwriters: Mick Jones, Lou Gramm, Ian McDonald
- Producers: Gary Lyons, John Sinclair

Foreigner singles chronology
"Cold as Ice" (1977)	"Long, Long Way From Home" (1977)	"Hot Blooded" (1978)

"Long, Long Way from Home" is a song written by Mick Jones, Lou Gramm and Ian McDonald that was initially released on Foreigner's debut album. It was the third single taken from the album.

== Lyrics and music ==
The lyrics refer to a person leaving a small town to try to succeed in New York City ("I left a small town for the apple in decay") and the loneliness he feels there. According to Gramm, the lyrics are autobiographical, reflecting his experience moving to New York City from his hometown of Gates, New York, outside of Rochester. Gramm and Jones have stated that this was the first song they worked on together. The song features a clavinet.

== Reception ==
The single was released in November 1977. It reached number 20 on the Billboard Hot 100 in 1978. It was also a hit in Canada, reaching #22.

Billboard described "Long, Long Way from Home" as a "sparkling rocker" with "urgent and soulful" vocals and a "hard driving hypnotic rhythm" propelled by the guitars and bass. Cash Box said that it "has an uplifting beat, with a sinewy lead vocal by Lou Gramm." Record World said that Foreigner "ought to have its third straight hit with this powerful, tuneful rocker."

Ultimate Classic Rock critic Eduardo Rivadavia rated it as Foreigner's 2nd most underrated song, while Classic Rock critic Malcolm Dome rated it their 4th most underrated song. Music author Kent Hartman described the song as an "anthem-like FM favorite." Rolling Stone critic John Milward rated it as the best song on Foreigner, comparing Gramm's vocal delivery to Paul Rodgers of Bad Company, and saying that the synthesizer and saxophone give it a bit of Roxy Music's sophistication. Billboard critic Gary Graff rated "Long, Long Way from Home" as one of McDonald's 10 best recorded saxophone performances, and as Foreigner's 2nd greatest song based in part on the strength of McDonald's performance.

Co-writer Mick Jones has rated it as one his favorite Foreigner songs.

== In popular culture ==
- The song was featured in the 13th episode of Supernatural's 4th season, and the 2nd episode of its 5th season.
