= Inside Information (album) =

Studio album by Foreigner
- Released: December 7, 1987
- Recorded: June−September 1987
- Studio: Right Track Recording (New York City)
- Genre: Rock
- Length: 44:12
- Label: Atlantic
- Producers: Mick Jones; Frank Filipetti (co-producer)

Foreigner chronology
Agent Provocateur (1984)	Inside Information (1987)	Unusual Heat (1991)

Singles from Inside Information
- 1. "Say You Will" Released: November 1987; 2. "I Don't Want to Live Without You" Released: March 25, 1988; 3. "Heart Turns to Stone" Released: July 1988

Inside Information is the sixth studio album by the British-American rock band Foreigner, released on December 7, 1987.

== Production ==
Inside Information was recorded from June to September 1987 at Right Track Recording in New York City. It was produced by Mick Jones and Frank Filipetti. It is the last Foreigner album to include the '80s core lineup of Gramm, Jones, Wills and Elliott.

"Out of the Blue" is the only song in the band's catalog to be credited to all four members from the classic 80's lineup.

In 1989, Gramm released his second solo album Long Hard Look, while Jones released his self-titled solo debut album.

== Releases ==
The album was released December 7, 1987 by the Atlantic record company.

"Say You Will" was released as the album's first single. Allmusic later noted that the single was a "good example" of the band's "balancing act" as "the guitar-heavy style of their early work gave way to slick arrangements that pushed electronics to the fore...temper(ing) its rock guitar edge...and Lou Gramm's quasi-operatic vocals...by thick layers of chiming synthesizers and an array of electronic textures." The single reached #6 on the Billboard Hot 100 in late February of 1988 and became their fourth #1 hit on the Billboard Hot Mainstream Rock Tracks chart, holding the top spot for four weeks. The song became the band's third-highest charting hit in Germany, where it reached #22, faring even better in Switzerland, the Netherlands, and particularly Norway, where it reached #4. The CD single featured an extended remix version of the track.

The second single, "I Don't Want to Live Without You", reached #5 on the Hot 100 in late May 1988. Markedly softer than any of their work to date, the record was their first and only #1 on the Adult Contemporary chart, after the more rousing ballads "Waiting for a Girl Like You" and "I Want to Know What Love Is" had reached #5 and #3 on that chart respectively. Allmusic would later observe that while "the end result lacked the distinctive rock touches of past Foreigner ballads, Lou Gramm contributes a lead vocal that avoids histrionics in favor of an emotional but very smooth delivery" over "washes of synthesizer...fleshed out by some meditative electric piano riffs". Nevertheless, the song charted at mainstream rock radio, where it peaked at #18. The #5 Hot 100 peak was their best showing in six singles, yet despite being followed up by more impassioned, up-tempo material it would be their last major pop hit to date.

The next single from the album was "Heart Turns to Stone", which had peaked at #7 on the Hot Mainstream Rock Tracks chart in an earlier non-commercial release only to rock radio but only managed #56 on the Hot 100 several months later in mid-1988. Cash Box said that even if "Heart Turns to Stone" could be called "corporate rock" the song works, and that "what Foreigner loses in pure originality they gain in accessibility and clarity."

== Reception ==
Professional ratings
Review scores
Source	Rating
Allmusic	3/5 stars
New Musical Express	2/10

The album debuted at 15 on the Billboard 200 Albums Chart, and was certified Platinum in the U.S. for sales exceeding one million copies. Although a commercial success, the band's sales were declining since the release of 4 in 1981, and Inside Information would be the band's last commercial success.

== Track listing ==
All tracks are written by Mick Jones and Lou Gramm, except where noted.

Side one
No.	Title	Writer(s)	Length
1.	"Heart Turns to Stone"		4:29
2.	"Can't Wait"		4:27
3.	"Say You Will"		4:12
4.	"I Don't Want to Live Without You"	Jones	4:52
5.	"Counting Every Minute"		4:11

Side two
No.	Title	Writer(s)	Length
6.	"Inside Information"	Jones	4:09
7.	"The Beat of My Heart"		5:10
8.	"Face to Face"		3:53
9.	"Out of the Blue"	Jones; Gramm; Rick Wills; Dennis Elliott	4:42
10.	"A Night to Remember"		4:07
Total length:			44:12

== Personnel ==
=== Foreigner ===
- Lou Gramm – lead vocals, percussion
- Mick Jones – keyboards, guitars, backing vocals
- Rick Wills – bass, backing vocals
- Dennis Elliott – drums

=== Additional personnel ===
- Peter-John Vettese – keyboards
- Tom Bailey – additional keyboards (4)
- Kevin Jones – Synclavier
- Hugh McCracken – Spanish guitar (7)
- Sammy Merendino – electronic percussion
- Mark Rivera – saxophone (1), backing vocals
- Ian Lloyd – backing vocals

== Production ==
- Producer – Mick Jones
- Co-Producer, Recording, and Mixing – Frank Filipetti
- Assistant Engineer – Billy Miranda
- Mastered by Ted Jensen at Sterling Sound (New York City, NY).
- Technical Support – Kevin Jones
- Pre-Production Assistant – Warren Austerer
- Art Direction – Bob Defrin
- Group Photography – E.J. Camp
- Front and Back Photography – Roger Corbeau
- Management – Bud Prager

== Charts ==
=== Weekly charts ===
Chart (1987–1988)	Peak position
Australia Albums (Kent Music Report)	33
Canada Top Albums/CDs (RPM)	23
Dutch Albums (Album Top 100)	26
Finnish Albums (The Official Finnish Charts)	1
German Albums (Offizielle Top 100)	7
Japanese Albums (Oricon)	9
Norwegian Albums (VG-lista)	5
Swedish Albums (Sverigetopplistan)	11
Swiss Albums (Schweizer Hitparade)	7
UK Albums (Official Charts)	64
US Billboard 200	15

=== Year-end charts ===
Chart (1988)	Position
German Albums (Offizielle Top 100)	43
US Billboard 200	47

== Certifications ==
Region	Certification	Certified units/sales
Germany (BVMI)	Gold	250,000^{^}
Switzerland (IFPI Switzerland)	Gold	25,000^{^}
United Kingdom (BPI)	Silver	60,000^{^}
United States (RIAA)	Platinum	1,000,000^{^}
^{^} Shipments figures based on certification alone.
