= Blue Morning, Blue Day =

1978 single by Foreigner

Single by Foreigner

from the album Double Vision
- B-side: "I Have Waited So Long"
- Released: December 1978 (US); February 16, 1979 (UK)
- Recorded: 1978
- Genre: Hard rock
- Length: 3:08
- Label: Atlantic
- Songwriters: Lou Gramm, Mick Jones
- Producers: Keith Olsen, Mick Jones, Ian McDonald

Foreigner singles chronology
"Double Vision" (1978)	"Blue Morning, Blue Day" (1978)	"Love Has Taken Its Toll" (1979)

Blue vinyl issue
- Limited edition release

Music video
- "Blue Morning, Blue Day" on YouTube

"Blue Morning, Blue Day" is a song written by Lou Gramm and Mick Jones that was first released as the third single on Foreigner's second album, Double Vision, reaching #15 on the Hot 100, the band's sixth top 40 single in two years, and #45 in the U.K. The song was backed with the Mick Jones song "I Have Waited So Long". "Blue Morning, Blue Day" is also available as downloadable content for the Rock Band series.

== Background ==
Gramm said about the song, "It talks about a young musician that's burning the candle at both ends. He has a lot on his mind, and walks the street at night." Classic Rock critic Malcolm Dome described the theme as a "tale of a musician who’s caught in a mental trap of his own making, and is desperate to break out of his misery." Blue is used as a metaphor for misery. The color was later in a different context on Gramm's 1987 solo hit "Midnight Blue". Gramm also stated that the song "came about a little later in the sessions. It was a dark horse track and the mood of it was dark, but the story of the song was so cool that it ended up being the third single from the album. We still play it to this day, both my band and Mick and his band."

St. Joseph News-Press critic Conrad Bibens described the lyrics as being "straight-forward reflections on love," as with many of the songs on Double Vision, and in this case expressing "amazement that [things are] going awry." Ultimate Classic Rock critic Matt Wardlaw describes the song as being about a "tangled relationship" reaching its breaking point and culminating with the singer telling his lover "Well, honey, don't telephone / 'Cause I won't be alone / I need someone to make me feel better." Jones has rated it one of his 11 favorite Foreigner songs, stating that it "signified the slightly dark and tense atmosphere that [Jones] felt was a very important part of our directions." The Record critic Rick Atkinson claims that "Blue Morning, Blue Day" repeats the guitar and keyboard sound that made earlier Foreigner single "Cold as Ice" successful. Rolling Stone critic Ken Tucker praised Gramm's vocal performance as a "charming" "McCartney-like coo."

== Reception ==
Billboard praised the "tasty guitar work," "punchy arrangement" and "strong vocals" on the song. Cash Box said that it has "majestic guitar lines, piano insistence and slapping drum beat," as well as "a rising guitar solo and solid lead and backing vocals" and maracas. Record World said that "Lou Gramm's vocals are penetrating." Pittsburgh Press critic Pete Bishop cited "Blue Morning, Blue Day" as representing what's good about Foreigner by "[blending] hearty rock, strong melody and arty touches."

Wardlaw rated "Blue Morning, Blue Day" as Foreigner's 9th greatest song. Dome rated it as Foreigner's 5th most underrated song, praising the "claustrophobic atmosphere, the "slowly swelling rhythms," and Jones' lead guitar playing. Stereo Review critic Joel Vance found it similar to the 1967 Lovin' Spoonful song "Six O'Clock".

== Personnel ==
- Lou Gramm – lead vocals
- Mick Jones – lead guitar, backing vocals, acoustic piano
- Ian McDonald – rhythm guitar, backing vocals
- Al Greenwood – keyboards
- Ed Gagliardi – bass guitar, backing vocals
- Dennis Elliott – drums

=== Additional musicians ===
- Ian Lloyd – backing vocals

== Chart performance ==
=== Weekly charts ===
Chart (1978–79)	Peak position
Canada Top Singles (RPM)	21
UK	45
U.S. Billboard Hot 100	15
U.S. Cashbox Top 100	19

=== Year-end charts ===
Chart (1979)	Rank
Canada	138
U.S. (Joel Whitburn's Pop Annual)	113
