= Double Vision (Foreigner song) =

Single by Foreigner

from the album Double Vision
- B-side: "Lonely Children"
- Released: September 8, 1978 (US); July 20, 1979 (UK)
- Recorded: 1978
- Genre: Hard rock
- Length: 3:29 (single version); 3:40 (album version)
- Label: Atlantic
- Songwriters: Lou Gramm, Mick Jones
- Producers: Ian McDonald, Keith Olsen, Mick Jones

Foreigner singles chronology
| "Hot Blooded" (1978) | "Double Vision" (1978) | "Blue Morning, Blue Day" (1979) |

Music video
- "Double Vision" on YouTube

"Double Vision" is a single by Foreigner from their second album of the same name. The song reached No. 2 on the Billboard Hot 100 chart for two weeks in 1978, behind "MacArthur Park" by Donna Summer. It became a gold record. The song was also a top 10 hit in Canada.

The song has been a staple of the band's setlist since its release. Over recent years, Lou Gramm and Foreigner (now fronted by Kelly Hansen) have both used the song as their show opener.

== Background and writing ==
In an interview, vocalist Lou Gramm explained the origin behind the song: "'Double Vision' was a song that was written in about late 1977 just before the Double Vision album came out. ...A lot of people think it's about being intoxicated or being high. When we were recording that song before we had the title, the New York Rangers hockey team was playing the Philadelphia Flyers and one of the big Flyers guys bumped into the Rangers' all-star goalie [John Davidson] and knocked him down and they had to take him out of the game because he was experiencing double vision." Gramm similarly stated:

I was a season ticket holder for the New York Rangers and they were playing the Philadelphia Flyers in the Stanley Cup Finals. While we were recording, I had an eight-inch TV taped inside my vocal booth with the volume turned all the way down. While I was singing and recording, I’d keep my eye on the screen. Then, whenever we stopped, I’d turn the volume up a little bit. On one occasion, the play had stopped when Dave Schultz from the Flyers skated in front of John Davidson, the Ranger’s goalie, gave him an elbow and knocked him out cold. The trainers helped Davidson off the ice and the Rangers wound up putting in the second-string goalie. Every so often, the announcers would come on and say they were waiting for word on the condition of Davidson. Finally, the announcer said, “The trainers said they don’t think Davidson will be back tonight. He doesn’t have a concussion, but he is experiencing… double vision." That’s when I said — “That’s it!”

According to the New York Rangers website, the incident actually took place in April 1978 during a hockey game between the Rangers and the Buffalo Sabres. The game announcers repeatedly used the phrase "double vision" which then inspired Foreigner to use it as the song's title. The single is certified RIAA gold, selling one million copies, prior to the reduction of gold certification standards that occurred in the late 1980s.

Rolling Stone critic Ken Tucker suggested that the title phrase seems to suggest that "all the pent-up frustration and rage felt by the narrator [due to his romantic agony] has found its pernicious outlet in a sort of ocular apoplexy."

== Reception ==
Billboard felt that "Double Vision" was a stronger single than the previous release "Hot Blooded" due to its "driving but less monotonous hard rock rhythm" and "more infectious melody." Cash Box said it has "slashing guitars and a mean, ticking beat" that gives way "to an appealing, lighter chorus which is underlined by gently swirling keyboard work" and also praised the vocal performance. Record World said that "The guitar work is formidable and Lou Gramm's vocals are always rock perfect."

Tucker criticized the song's "self-pity" and said that "Gramm's histrionic head tones threaten to capsize his sinuses as he moans about the suffering he must bear at the hands of wretched women." The Daily News Journal critic Gary Balser regarded "Double Vision" as the best song on the album, stating that it is "an example of Foreigner's individual sound with a keyboard interlude and a constant bass and guitar drive." San Pedro News-Pilot critic Joseph Bensoua said it has "just the right hooks, phrasing and simple lyrics needed for controlled rock 'n' roll. St. Joseph News-Press critic Conrad Bibens described "Double Vision" as "competent but a little too bombastic."

Music critic Maury Dean stated that it "sparks double-whammy of...Jones's steamy guitar salvos and Lou Gramm's White Soul volcanic vocalics." Detroit Free Press critic Kim McAuliffe described the melody as being "one of those ditties, like a television commercial jingle, that imprints itself on your brain whether you want it to or not." Billboard reviewer Gary Graff rated "Double Vision" to be Foreigner's 10th greatest song. Classic Rock History critic Brian Kachejian rated it as Foreigner's 5th best song, particularly praising the opening guitar riff.

== Chart history ==
=== Weekly charts ===
| Chart (1978–1979) | Peak position |
|---|---|
| Australia Kent Music Report | 97 |
| Canada Top Singles (RPM) | 7 |
| South Africa (Springbok Radio) | 6 |
| US Billboard Hot 100 | 2 |
| US Cash Box Top 100 | 5 |

=== Year-end charts ===
| Chart (1978) | Rank |
|---|---|
| Canada | 91 |
| US Cash Box | 65 |

| Chart (1979) | Rank |
|---|---|
| US Billboard Hot 100 | 88 |
