= Double Vision (Foreigner album) =

- Original sleeve by Norman Seeff. (The band is in the French Quarter in New Orleans, in front of the Market Place Produce Company #81 French Market Place).

Studio album by Foreigner
- Released: June 20, 1978
- Recorded: March – May 1978
- Studios: Sound City, Van Nuys
- Genres: Hard rock; arena rock
- Length: 37:55
- Label: Atlantic
- Producers: Keith Olsen; Mick Jones; Ian McDonald

Foreigner chronology
Foreigner (1977)	Double Vision (1978)	Head Games (1979)

Alternative cover art
- U.S. 2nd vinyl pressing

Singles from Double Vision
- 1. "Hot Blooded" Released: June 1978; 2. "Double Vision" Released: September 1978; 3. "Blue Morning, Blue Day" Released: December 1978

Professional ratings
Review scores
Source	Rating
AllMusic	4/5 stars
Christgau's Record Guide	C−
Rolling Stone	3.5/5 stars

Double Vision is the second studio album by the British-American rock band Foreigner, released on June 20, 1978, by Atlantic Records. Recorded between March and May 1978, it was Foreigner's only album co-produced by Keith Olsen and the last recording with bass guitarist Ed Gagliardi, who would later be replaced by Rick Wills.

Double Vision was the first in the line of many other recordings in which A&R executive John Kalodner would simply have his name listed twice in liner notes, as a play on the title of this album. The phrase "John Kalodner: John Kalodner" originated when the producer Olsen was wondering just how to credit Kalodner's involvement in the band and the album. In keeping with the double vision theme, guitarist Mick Jones came up with an idea of doubling the name.

"Tramontane" is the only instrumental track Foreigner have released to date on a studio album.

Mick Jones takes the lead vocals on "Back Where You Belong" and "I Have Waited So Long".

== Release ==
The album peaked at number 3 on the Billboard 200 chart and earning platinum certification a week after its release. It has now been certified 7× platinum for sales in excess of 7 million units and along with the compilation Records (1982) is counted as Foreigner's best-selling album. In Europe, however, Double Vision reached the Top 40 only in the United Kingdom.

The lead single, released in June 1978, was "Hot Blooded", which reached number 3 on the Billboard Hot 100 chart. In September, it was followed by "Double Vision", which charted at number 2. This was the highest position Foreigner had attained to that time. The third and final single, "Blue Morning, Blue Day", was released in December and climbed to number 15 on the chart.

== Reception ==
Los Angeles Times critic Robert Hilburn described Double Vision as "slickly produced, commercially powerful, but artistically vapid." The Record critic Rick Atkinson said of the album that it used the same formula as Foreigner's debut album such that "Foreigner's Clone" would have been an appropriate title.

According to Atkinson, "Tramontane" was the only "new and different track" on the album. Atkinson describes "Tramontane" as having a "heavy keyboard line" but that all members of the group "get a quick shot at the spotlight." On the other hand, The Morning News critic Gary Mullinax described "Tramontane" as "a densely textured instrumental that is pleasant enough but doesn't really go anywhere." Unlike most Foreigner songs, Tramontane was written primarily by Al Greenwood. Ian McDonald played a lyricon on the track.

Murfreesboro Press critic Van West also recognized Double Vision as having similarities to Foreigner, but said that there are important differences; in particular, Double Vision has "more individualistic interpretations" and a "heavy metal tonal structure" instead of some of the "careful harmonies" of the debut album.

New York Daily News critic Ace Adams called Double Vision "a fine collection of songs" that is "hard rock at its best."

Record World said that, besides the hit singles, "'Back Where You Belong' and 'Spellbinder' shows [Foreigner's] expertise and maturity as a band." PopMatters critic Evan Sawdey commented on the non-single album tracks, saying that "the gloomy 'Tramontane' and the rewrite of 'The Damage is Done' that was 'Spellbinder' did little to expand the band’s sound so much as it was a pushing of its existing abilities into more commercial shapes" but praised "the shimmering acoustic wonder that was 'Back Where You Belong.'"

Jones has rated two songs from the album ("Blue Morning, Blue Day" and "Spellbinder") as among his 11 favorite Foreigner songs.

== Track listing ==
All music is composed by Mick Jones, except where noted.

Side one
No.	Title	Lyrics	Music	Length
1.	"Hot Blooded"	Lou Gramm		4:28
2.	"Blue Morning, Blue Day"	Gramm; Jones		3:12
3.	"You're All I Am"	Jones		3:24
4.	"Back Where You Belong"	Jones		3:14
5.	"Love Has Taken Its Toll"	Gramm	Ian McDonald	3:29

Side two
No.	Title	Lyrics	Music	Length
6.	"Double Vision"	Gramm; Jones		3:44
7.	"Tramontane" (instrumental)		Al Greenwood; McDonald; Jones	3:56
8.	"I Have Waited So Long"	Jones		4:07
9.	"Lonely Children"	Jones		3:37
10.	"Spellbinder"	Gramm		4:45
Total length:				37:55

2002 Rhino Records remastered edition bonus tracks
No.	Title	Writer(s)	Length
11.	"Hot Blooded" (live)	Gramm; Jones	6:58
12.	"Love Maker" (live)	Betty Wright; Clarence Reid; Willie Clarke	6:49
Total length:			52:01

== Personnel ==
=== Foreigner ===
- Lou Gramm – lead vocals, percussion
- Mick Jones – lead guitar, backing vocals, piano, lead vocals (4, 8)
- Ian McDonald – guitars, keyboards, reeds, vocals
- Al Greenwood – keyboards, synthesizer
- Ed Gagliardi – bass, vocals
- Dennis Elliott – drums

=== Additional musicians ===
- Ian Lloyd – backing vocals
- David Paich – string arrangements

=== Production ===
- Producers – Mick Jones, Ian McDonald and Keith Olsen.
- Engineers – David De Vore and Keith Olsen
- Mixing – Jimmy Douglass, Mick Jones and Ian McDonald.
- Mastered by George Marino at Sterling Sound (New York, NY).
- Technicians – Troby Laidlaw, Randy Mason, Mac McCollum and Michael McConnell.
- Design and Photography – Norman Seeff

Remastering credits

- John Kalodner – John Kalodner
- 1995 digital remastering by Ted Jensen at Sterling Sound.
- Dan Hersch – 2002 digital remastering
- Shawn R. Britton – 2011 MFSL mastering (at Mobile Fidelity Sound Lab, Sebastopol, California)

== Charts ==
Chart (1978)	Peak position
Australian Albums (Kent Music Report)	13
Canada Top Albums/CDs (RPM)	3
Japanese Albums (Oricon)	61
New Zealand Albums (RMNZ)	32
UK Albums (Official Charts)	32
US Billboard 200	3

== Certifications ==
Region	Certification	Certified units/sales
Canada (Music Canada)	2× Platinum	200,000^{^}
Japan (RIAJ)	Gold	100,000^{^}
United States (RIAA)	7× Platinum	7,000,000^{^}
^{^} Shipments figures based on certification alone.
