= Michael Bluestein =

American musician

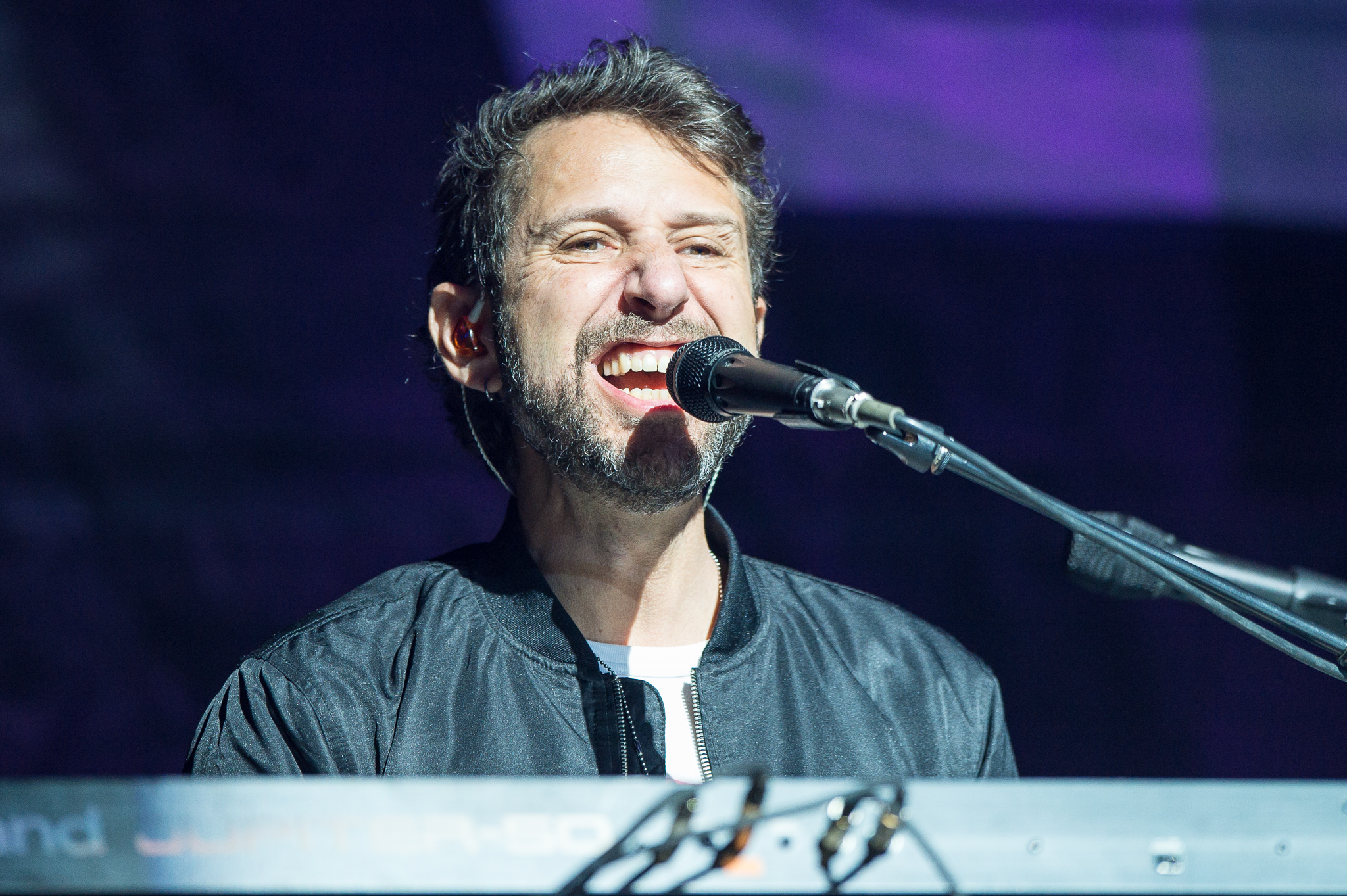
- Bluestein performing in 2016

Background information
- Occupations: Musician; songwriter; vocalist; composer; record producer
- Instruments: Keyboards; vocals; guitar

Michael Bluestein is an American musician. He is currently a member of the rock band Foreigner since 2008, and has been a high-profile touring keyboardist and vocalist since moving to Los Angeles in 2003.

Bluestein began classical piano studies at age nine, and started playing pop, jazz and soul music when he reached his teens where he attended Brookline High School, located in Brookline, Massachusetts just outside Boston. Bluestein attended Berklee College of Music in Boston where he studied jazz piano and composition. At Berklee he studied with pianists Bruce Barth and Christian Jacob, and immersed himself in the jazz piano styles of Bill Evans, Oscar Peterson, Herbie Hancock, McCoy Tyner, and Keith Jarrett.

Shortly after receiving his B.A. from Berklee College Of Music, Bluestein moved to San Francisco where he spent 10 years highly involved in the Bay Area music scene. In San Francisco, Bluestein released three CDs under his name. The first one, the EP Reflections (2000) featured six original pop songs with Bluestein on vocals and keyboards. His second CD, Wild World, (2001) is a jazz trio recording with Jon Evans on bass and Jason Lewis on drums. His third CD, Ambient Soul (2003) is also an instrumental jazz recording with Jon Evans and Jason Lewis, and also features guest spots with drummer Matt Chamberlain and guitarist Will Bernard. Bluestein was quite active as a sideman and session player in San Francisco. He played Hammond B3 and keyboards in guitarist Bernard's group from 1998 to 2002. He also accompanied and recorded with many jazz vocalists including Kitty Margolis, Jacqui Naylor, Kenny Washington and Mary Stallings. He toured with Linda Perry of 4 Non Blondes in 1996-1997 and with Shelby Lynne in 2000.

Since moving to Los Angeles in 2003, Bluestein has toured and recorded with Boz Scaggs (2003), Anastacia (2004–2006), Enrique Iglesias (2007–2008), Roger Hodgson (2009) and with Foreigner (2008–present). He has also done occasional performances with Burt Bacharach and Stevie Nicks.

== Leave of absence ==
MusicNews.com reported on June 2, 2012, that Bluestein has posted the following message on Foreigner's official website:

I recently went to the hospital following some symptoms, and it was discovered that I have Colorectal cancer. This has required me to take a leave of absence from the band for a significant period.
