= Foreigner (Foreigner album) =

Studio album by Foreigner
- Released: March 8, 1977
- Recorded: December 1976
- Studios: The Hit Factory and Atlantic Recording Studios, New York, New York.
- Genres: Hard rock; arena rock; power pop
- Length: 38:50 (original); 50:24 (2002 reissue)
- Label: Atlantic
- Producers: John Sinclair and Gary Lyons in collaboration Mick Jones and Ian McDonald

Foreigner chronology
Foreigner (1977)	Double Vision (1978)

Singles from Foreigner
- 1. "Feels Like the First Time" Released: March 4, 1977; 2. "Cold as Ice" Released: July 1, 1977; 3. "Long, Long Way from Home" Released: November 23, 1977

Professional ratings
Review scores
Source	Rating
AllMusic	4/5 stars
Christgau's Record Guide	C
The Rolling Stone Album Guide	3.5/5 stars

Foreigner is the debut studio album by British-American rock band Foreigner, released on March 8, 1977, through Atlantic.

It spun off three hit singles, "Feels Like the First Time", "Cold as Ice" and "Long, Long Way from Home".

It also features album tracks such as "Headknocker" and "Starrider", the latter of which features a rare lead vocal from lead guitarist and co-founder Mick Jones.

== Writing and recording ==
Jones had written several songs that wound up on Foreigner prior to the formation of the band. Lead singer Lou Gramm sang three of them – "Feels Like the First Time", "Woman, Oh Woman" and "At War with the World" in his audition to form the band. After the formation of the band, Gramm and Jones worked on several other songs, including "Long, Long Way from Home" (along with Ian McDonald), "Cold as Ice" and "I Need You".

McDonald claimed that although he received a writing credit only on "Long, Long Way from Home" he had a significant role in writing several of the other songs on the album. According to McDonald:

I had a lot to do with the development of the songs. And I’m still bitter about the way I was treated by some people connected to the band. I should have had co-writing credits on a lot more than just one song. And even with 'Long, Long Way From Home' I remember telling Mick that I wanted to have a share of the writing, because of all I’d put in to making it happen, especially on the vocal arrangements. He gave me a look that said he wasn’t happy with the idea, and he reluctantly agreed. But I deserved a lot more of the credit than I was given. That’s the music business, though.

Jones had wanted Roy Thomas Baker to produce the album, but he was not available. Instead, Sarm Studios owners Gary Lyons, who had worked as an engineer on several Queen albums that Baker produced, and John Sinclair served as producers along with Jones and McDonald.

There is some disagreement about the roles that Jones and McDonald played in producing the album.

According to Lyons:

Actually, Mick and Ian did very little on the production side. Typical of musicians, they wanted their names included, but they had nothing to do with what happened on the production side, although later on they remixed the album without John and me [we shall come to this shortly]. I can show you my contract for the album. John and I are down as the sole producers.

On the other hand, Jones says that:

I had already gotten a lot of experience of working in studios, through collaborating with some top producers like Glyn Johns. Both Ian and I worked closely on the way the album sounded. But it was a joint effort. I always like to involve people and get a team spirit going, which is what we did here.

The first attempt at mixing the album was done at Sarm Studios, London, but as they were dissatisfied with the result, the album was re-mixed at Atlantic Recording Studios by Jones, McDonald and Jimmy Douglass.

In July 2010, the audiophile label Mobile Fidelity Sound Lab released this album on the Super Audio Compact Disc (SACD) format. It is presented in a "Mini Vinyl" replica cardboard case but omits the bonus tracks.

== Reception ==
Hartford Courant critic Henry McNulty said "There's something good beginning here, and the sooner you get in on it the better."

Los Angeles Times critic Robert Hilburn summed up his contemporary review of Foreigner saying "The production work is crisp, the melodies are serviceable and the vocals are eager. But there is far too little point of view to make any of it commanding."

Annison Star reviewer Mike Stamler felt that most of the songs were "sanforized, sanitized and safely sterilized into three basic chords" with "immature lyrics," leaving little variety on the album, and suggested that more instrumental solos would have been beneficial.

Allmusic critic Andy Hinds said that for suburban teenagers in the 1970s the "immaculate rock sound" on Foreigner "was the perfect soundtrack for cruising through well-manicured neighborhoods in their Chevy Novas," and praised the band's "pure rock craftsmanship."

PopMatters critic Evan Sawdey felt that the non-single album tracks on Foreigner were more successful than their counterparts on subsequent Foreigner albums. He explicitly called out the artiness and folkiness of “Starrider”, the "casual creep" of “The Damage is Done” and the "fiery" “I Need You”, although he did say that “Woman Oh Woman” "started skirting into cheesy ballad territory" and that its "lead synth line has not aged well at all."

Billboard reviewer Gary Graff rated four of the songs from Foreigner (the three singles plus "Headknocker") among the ten greatest Foreigner songs. Gary Graff described "Headknocker" as a "gritty, stomping rocker."

Classic Rock History critic Brian Kachejian rated three songs from Foreigner as being among the band's top 10 songs; "Feels Like the First Time", "Cold as Ice" and "Fool for You Anyway." Brian Kachejian called "Fool for You Anyway" a "great grooving ballad" with "a bit of an Eagles feel."

Classic Rock critic Malcolm Dome rated two songs from Foreigner as being among Foreigner's 10 most underrated – "Starrider" at #7 and "Long, Long Way from Home" at #4. Malcolm Dome calls Starrider a "beautifully developed, introspective tale of aspiration," even though it doesn't sound much like Foreigner and its lyrics "come across as 50s pulp sci fi."

Ultimate Classic Rock critic Eduardo Rivadavia also rated two songs from Foreigner among the band's 10 most underrated – "Fool for You Anyway" at #6 and "Long, Long Way from Home" at #2.

Foreigner guitarist Mick Jones has rated four songs from the album ("Long, Long Way from Home," "Cold as Ice," "The Damage Is Done" and "Fool for You Anyway") as being among his 11 favorite Foreigner songs.

== Track listing ==
Side one
No.	Title	Writer(s)	Length
1.	"Feels Like the First Time"	Mick Jones	3:49
2.	"Cold as Ice"	Jones; Lou Gramm	3:23
3.	"Starrider"	Al Greenwood; Jones	4:01
4.	"Headknocker"	Gramm; Jones	2:58
5.	"The Damage Is Done"	Jones; Gramm	4:15

Side two
No.	Title	Writer(s)	Length
6.	"Long, Long Way from Home"	Jones; Gramm; Ian McDonald	2:53
7.	"Woman Oh Woman"	Jones	3:49
8.	"At War with the World"	Jones	4:18
9.	"Fool for You Anyway"	Jones	4:15
10.	"I Need You"	Gramm; Jones	5:09
Total length:			38:50

Bonus tracks on 2002 reissue (demos)
No.	Title	Length
11.	"Feels Like the First Time"	3:40
12.	"Woman Oh Woman"	4:14
13.	"At War with the World"	5:00
14.	"Take Me to Your Leader"	3:40
Total length:		50:24

== Personnel ==
Foreigner

- Lou Gramm – lead vocals, percussion
- Mick Jones – lead guitar, piano (track 2), backing vocals, lead vocals (tracks 3 & 7)
- Ian McDonald – guitar, keyboards (track 2 & 6), saxophone (track 6), flute (track 3), backing vocals
- Al Greenwood – keyboards, synthesizers
- Ed Gagliardi – bass, backing vocals
- Dennis Elliott – drums

Additional personnel

- Ian Lloyd – backing vocals

Production

- Producers – Gary Lyons and John Sinclair, in collaboration with Mick Jones and Ian McDonald
- Engineer – Gary Lyons
- Assistant Engineers – Jimmy Douglass, Michael Getlin, Kevin Herron and Randy Mason
- Mixing – Jimmy Douglass, Mick Jones and Ian McDonald
- Basic Tracks recorded at The Hit Factory and Atlantic Recording Studios
- Overdubs recorded at Atlantic Recording Studios
- Mixed at Atlantic Recording Studios.
- Mastered by George Marino at Sterling Sound.
- Art Direction – Bob Defrin
- Cover Illustrations – Alex Gnidziejko
- Hand Lettering - Gerard Huerta

== Charts ==
Chart (1977)	Peak position
Australian Albums (Kent Music Report)	9
Canada Top Albums/CDs (RPM)	9
Japanese Albums (Oricon)	57
US Billboard 200	4

== Certifications ==
Region	Certification	Certified units/sales
Australia (ARIA)	Platinum	70,000^{^}
Canada (Music Canada)	Platinum	100,000^{^}
Japan (RIAJ)	Gold	100,000^{^}
Netherlands (NVPI)	Gold	50,000^{^}
United States (RIAA)	5× Platinum	5,000,000^{^}
^{^} Shipments figures based on certification alone.
