= New Jersey =

U.S. state

- State
- Flag Seal
- Nickname: The Garden State
- Motto(s): Liberty and prosperity
- Location of New Jersey within the United States
- Country: United States
- Before statehood: Province of New Jersey
- Admitted to the Union: December 18, 1787 (3rd)
- Capital: Trenton
- Largest city: Newark
- Largest county or equivalent: Bergen
- Largest metro and urban areas: New York

Government
  - Governor: Mikie Sherrill (D)
  - Lieutenant Governor: Shirley Emehelu (D)
- Legislature: New Jersey Legislature
  - Upper house: Senate
  - Lower house: General Assembly
- Judiciary: Supreme Court of New Jersey
- U.S. senators: Cory Booker (D); Andy Kim (D)
- U.S. House delegation: 9 Democrats; 3 Republicans (list)

Area
  - Total: 8,722.58 sq mi (22,591.38 km^{2})
  - Land: 7,354.22 sq mi (19,047.34 km^{2})
  - Water: 1,368.36 sq mi (3,544.04 km^{2}) 15.7%
  - Rank: 47th

Dimensions
  - Length: 170 mi (273 km)
  - Width: 70 mi (112 km)
- Elevation: 260 ft (80 m)
- Highest elevation (High Point (Note: Elevation adjusted to North American Vertical Datum of 1988)): 1,803 ft (549.6 m)
- Lowest elevation (Atlantic Ocean): 0 ft (0 m)

Population (2025)
  - Total: ▲9,548,215
  - Rank: 11th
  - Density: 1,291.9/sq mi (498.8/km^{2})
  - Rank: 1st
  - Median household income: $99,800 (2023)
  - Income rank: 2nd
- Demonym(s): New Jerseyan (official), New Jerseyite

Language
  - Official language: None
  - Spoken language: (2021 American Community Survey): English; Spanish; Portuguese; Hindi; Gujarati; Chinese; Korean; Arabic; Polish; Haitian Creole; Italian; Tagalog; Russian; Telugu; French; Urdu
- Time zone: UTC−05:00 (Eastern)
  - Summer (DST): UTC−04:00 (EDT)
- USPS abbreviation: NJ
- ISO 3166 code: US-NJ
- Traditional abbreviation: N.J.
- Latitude: 38°56′ N to 41°21′ N
- Longitude: 73°54′ W to 75°34′ W
- Website: nj.gov

New Jersey is a state located in both the Mid-Atlantic and Northeastern regions of the United States. Located at the geographic hub of the heavily urbanized Northeast megalopolis, it is bordered to the northwest, north, and northeast by New York State; on its east, southeast, and south by the Atlantic Ocean; on its west by the Delaware River and Pennsylvania; and on its southwest by Delaware Bay and Delaware. At 7,354 square miles (19,050 km^{2}), New Jersey is the fifth-smallest U.S. state by land area. According to a 2025 U.S. Census Bureau estimate, it is the 11th-most populous state, with over 9.5 million residents, its highest estimated count ever. The state capital is Trenton, and the state's most populous city is Newark. New Jersey is the most densely populated U.S. state, and is the only U.S. state in which every county is deemed urban by the U.S. Census Bureau.

New Jersey was first inhabited by Paleo-Indians as early as 13,000 BC. The Lenape were the dominant Indigenous group when Europeans arrived in the early 17th century, and they were subdivided into dialectal groups such as the Munsee, in the north, and the Unami and the Unalachtigo, elsewhere. Dutch and Swedish colonists founded the first European settlements in the state, with the British later seizing control of the region and establishing the Province of New Jersey, named after the Channel Island of Jersey. The colony's fertile lands and relative religious tolerance drew a large and diverse population. New Jersey was among the Thirteen Colonies that supported the American Revolution, hosting several pivotal battles and military commands in the American Revolutionary War earning the title "Crossroads of the American Revolution". New Jersey remained in the Union during the American Civil War and provided troops, resources, and military leaders in support of the Union Army. After the war, the state emerged as a major manufacturing center and a leading destination for immigrants, helping drive the Industrial Revolution in the U.S. New Jersey was the site of many industrial, technological, and commercial innovations. Many prominent Americans associated with New Jersey have proven influential nationally and globally, including in academia, social advocacy, business, entertainment, government, military, non-profit leadership, and other fields.

New Jersey's central location in the Northeast megalopolis helped fuel its rapid growth and suburbanization in the second half of the 20th century. Since the beginning of the 21st century, the state's economy has become highly diversified, with major sectors, including New Jersey's role as the world's largest biopharmaceutical industry hub, and is widely known as the "Medicine Chest of the World". New Jersey excels in biotechnology, information technology, STEM education, finance, digital media, filmmaking, and tourism, and it has become an Atlantic seaboard epicenter for logistics and distribution. New Jersey is a major destination for immigrants and is home to one of the world's most multicultural populations. Since the onset of the 21st century, re-urbanization is taking place in New Jersey, particularly near New Jersey Transit rail hubs. New Jersey is the fastest-growing state in the U.S. Northeast and one of the fastest-growing in the United States overall, attributed to its resilient economy and aggressive homebuilding policies.

New Jersey is one of the most developed states in the U.S. New Jersey had a median household income of $99,781 as of 2023, the second-highest of any U.S. state behind Massachusetts. Almost one-tenth of all households in the state, or over 323,000, are millionaires, the highest representation of millionaires among all states and the highest density per square mile. Despite not being a U.S. border state, one-quarter of New Jersey's population is foreign born, the second-highest proportion after California. The state ranks near the top on both the American Human Development Index and the standard Human Development Index. New Jersey has been ranked the top U.S. state in physical and emotional wellness, despite being one of the most expensive states for residents to live in.

According to climatology research by the U.S. National Oceanic and Atmospheric Administration, New Jersey has been the fastest-warming state by average air temperature over a 100-year period beginning in the early 20th century, which has been attributed to significant warming of the North Atlantic Ocean, and the coastal waters of the Jersey Shore constitute one of the fastest-warming urban ocean shorelines in the world.

== History ==
=== Prehistoric era ===
The pressure of collision between North America and Africa gave rise to the Appalachian Mountains. Around 18,000 years ago, the Ice Age resulted in glaciers that reached New Jersey. As glaciers retreated, they left behind Lake Passaic along with rivers, meadows, swamps, and gorges.

Since the 6th millennium BC, Native American people have inhabited New Jersey, beginning with the Lenape tribe. Scheyichbi is the Lenape name for the land that represents present-day New Jersey. The Lenape were several autonomous groups that practiced maize agriculture in order to supplement their hunting and gathering in the region surrounding the Delaware River, the lower Hudson River, and western Long Island Sound. The Lenape were divided into matrilineal clans that were based upon common female ancestors. Clans were organized into three distinct phratries identified by their animal sign: Turtle, Turkey, and Wolf. They first encountered the Dutch in the early 17th century, and their primary relationship with the Dutch and later European settlers was through fur trade.

=== Colonial era ===
A map of New Netherland and New Sweden in present-day New Jersey during the colonial era

The Dutch were the first Europeans to lay claim to geographic territory in present-day New Jersey. The Dutch colony of New Netherland consisted of parts of the modern Mid-Atlantic states. Although the European principle of land ownership was not recognized by the Lenape, Dutch West India Company policy required its colonists to purchase land that they settled. The first to do so was Michiel Pauw, who established a patroonship called Pavonia in 1630 along North River, that eventually became Bergen, the first permanent settlement, local civil government, and municipality in the state. Peter Minuit's purchase of lands along the Delaware River established the colony of New Sweden, that lasted until the Dutch conquered it in 1655. The entire region became a territory of England on June 24, 1664, after an English fleet under command of Colonel Richard Nicolls sailed into what is now New York Harbor and took control of Fort Amsterdam, annexing the entire province.

During the English Civil War, the Channel Island of Jersey remained loyal to the British Crown and gave sanctuary to the King. In the Royal Square in St Helier, Charles II of England was proclaimed King in 1649, following the execution of his father, Charles I. North American lands were divided by Charles II, who gave his brother, the Duke of York (later King James II), the region between New England and Maryland as a proprietary colony (as opposed to a royal colony). James then granted land between the Hudson River and the Delaware River (the land that would become New Jersey) to two friends who had remained loyal through the English Civil War: Sir George Carteret and Lord Berkeley of Stratton. The area was named the Province of New Jersey.

Since its inception, New Jersey has been characterized by ethnic and religious diversity. New England Congregationalists settled alongside Scots Presbyterians and Dutch Reformed migrants. While the majority of residents lived in towns with individual landholdings of 100 acres (40 ha), a few rich proprietors owned vast estates. English Quakers and Anglicans owned large landholdings. Unlike Plymouth Colony, Jamestown and other colonies, New Jersey was populated by a secondary wave of immigrants who came from other colonies instead of those who migrated directly from Europe. New Jersey remained agrarian and rural throughout the colonial era, and commercial farming developed sporadically. Some townships, such as Burlington on the Delaware River and Perth Amboy, emerged as important ports for shipping to New York City and Philadelphia. The colony's fertile lands and tolerant religious policy drew more settlers, and the New Jersey population had increased to 120,000 by 1775.

Settlement for the first ten years of English rule took place along the Hackensack River and Arthur Kill. Settlers came primarily from New York and New England. On March 18, 1673, Berkeley sold his half of the colony to Quakers in England, who settled the Delaware Valley region as a Quaker colony, with William Penn acting as trustee for the lands for a time. New Jersey was governed as two distinct provinces, East and West Jersey, for 28 years between 1674 and 1702, which were part of the Dominion of New England from 1686 to 1689.

In 1702, the two provinces were reunited under a royal governor rather than a proprietary one. Edward Hyde, titled Lord Cornbury, became the first governor of the royal colony. Britain believed that he was an ineffective and corrupt ruler, taking bribes and speculating on land. In 1708, he was recalled to England. New Jersey was then ruled by the governors of New York, but this infuriated the settlers of New Jersey, who accused these governors of favoritism to New York. Judge Lewis Morris led the case for a separate governor, and was appointed governor by King George II in 1738.

=== Revolutionary War era ===
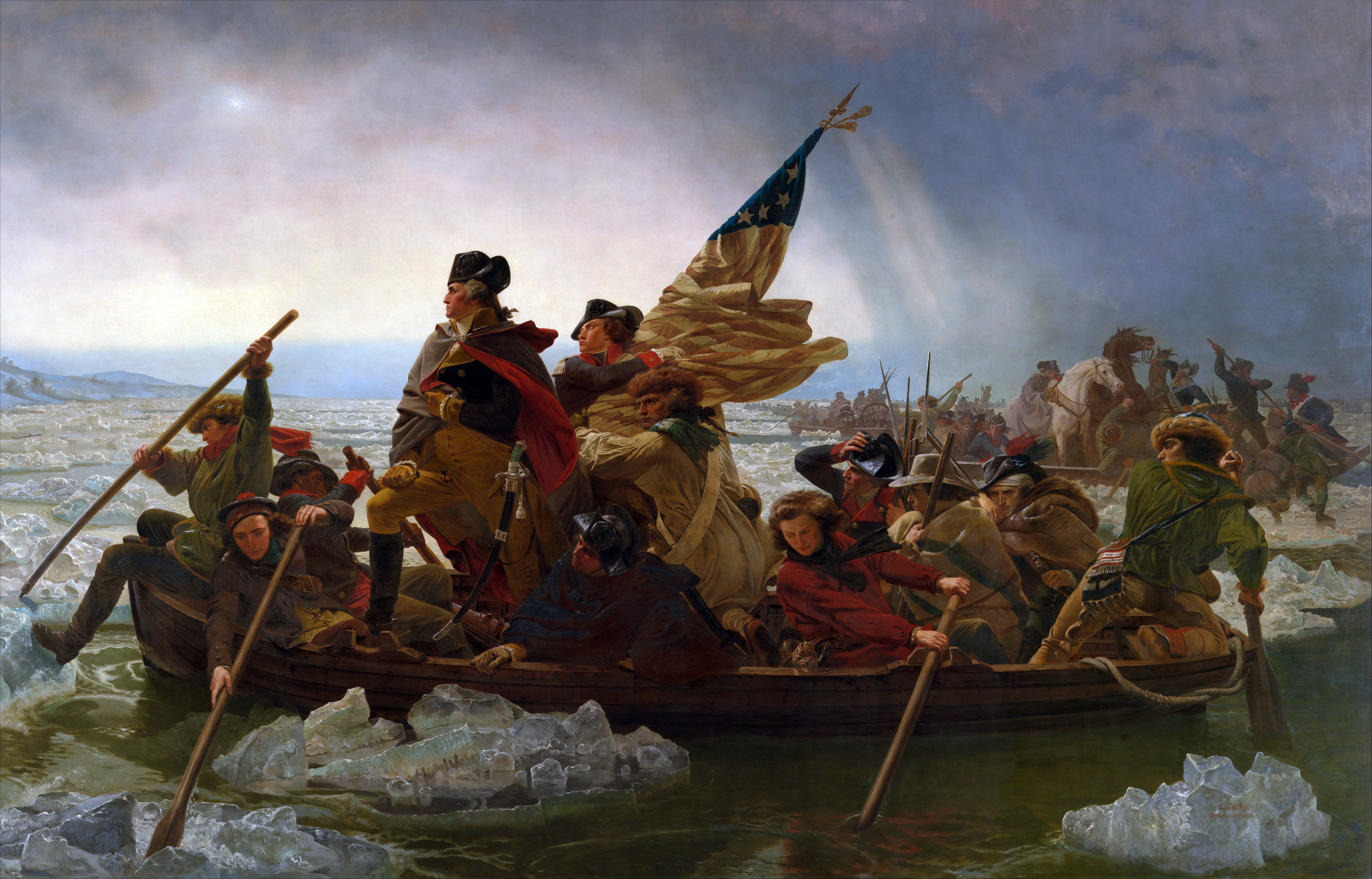
Washington Crossing the Delaware, an 1851 portrait by Emanuel Leutze depicting Washington's covert crossing the Delaware River from Bucks County, Pennsylvania to Mercer County on December 25, 1776, prior to the Battle of Trenton

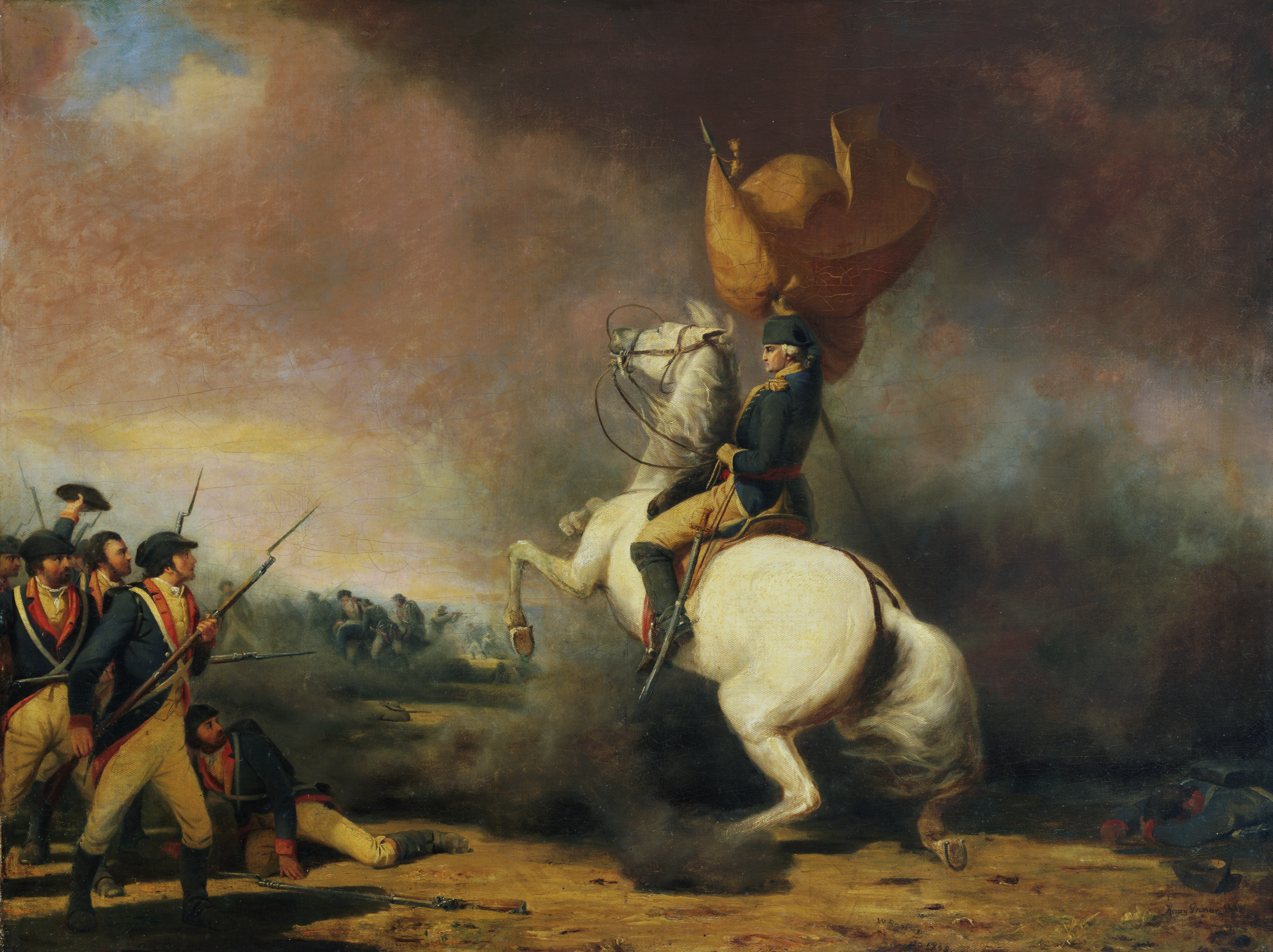
Washington Rallying the Americans at the Battle of Princeton, a portrait by William Ranney depicting George Washington rallying Continental Army troops at the Battle of Princeton in January 1777

New Jersey was one of the Thirteen Colonies that revolted against British rule in the American Revolution and declared independence from British rule. The New Jersey Constitution of 1776 was passed July 2, 1776, just two days before the Second Continental Congress declared American Independence from Great Britain. It was an act of the Provincial Congress, which made itself into the State Legislature. To reassure neutrals, the new constitution provided that the legislature would disband if New Jersey reached reconciliation with Great Britain. Among the 56 founders who signed the Declaration of Independence, five were New Jersey representatives: Richard Stockton, John Witherspoon, Francis Hopkinson, John Hart, and Abraham Clark.

During the American Revolutionary War, British and American armies crossed New Jersey numerous times with several pivotal battles taking place in the state. In total, there were 296 engagements that occurred within New Jersey, more clashes than occurred in any other of the 13 colonies during the war. Because of this, New Jersey today is sometimes referred to as "The Crossroads of the American Revolution". The winter quarters of the Continental Army were established in New Jersey twice by General George Washington in Morristown, which has been called "The Military Capital of the American Revolution".

On the night of December 25–26, 1776, the Continental Army under George Washington crossed the Delaware River. After the crossing, they surprised and defeated the Hessian troops in the Battle of Trenton. Slightly more than a week after victory at Trenton, Continental Army forces gained an important victory by stopping General Cornwallis's charges at the Second Battle of Trenton. Evading Cornwallis's army, the Continental Army launched a surprise attack on Princeton and defeated the British on January 3, 1777. Emanuel Leutze's painting of Washington Crossing the Delaware became an icon of the Revolution.

Continental Army forces under Washington's command met British forces under General Henry Clinton at the Battle of Monmouth in an indecisive engagement in June 1778. Washington's forces attempted to take the British column by surprise. When the British army attempted to flank the Americans, the Continental Army retreated in disorder. Their ranks were later reorganized and withstood British charges.

In the summer of 1783, the Continental Congress met in Nassau Hall at Princeton University, making Princeton the nation's capital for four months. It was there that the Continental Congress learned of the signing of the Treaty of Paris, which ended the war.

On December 18, 1787, New Jersey became the third state to ratify the United States Constitution, which was overwhelmingly popular in New Jersey since it prevented New York and Pennsylvania from charging tariffs on goods imported from Europe. On November 20, 1789, New Jersey became the first in the newly formed Union to ratify the Bill of Rights.

The New Jersey 1776 State Constitution gave the vote to all inhabitants who had a certain level of wealth or owned property. Both parties passed the Voting Rights Acts. This included women and Black people, excluding married women who were not legally permitted to own property separately from their husbands. Unmarried women retained their suffrage in the new state of New Jersey from 1776 to 1807. Nonetheless, in several elections both sides claimed that their opposing candidates were without merit and were trying to win just by influencing women voters and they accused their opponents of seeking "petticoat electors". In 1807, the state legislature passed a bill interpreting the constitution to mean universal white male suffrage, excluding paupers; the constitution was itself an act of the legislature and not enshrined as the modern constitution.

=== 19th century ===
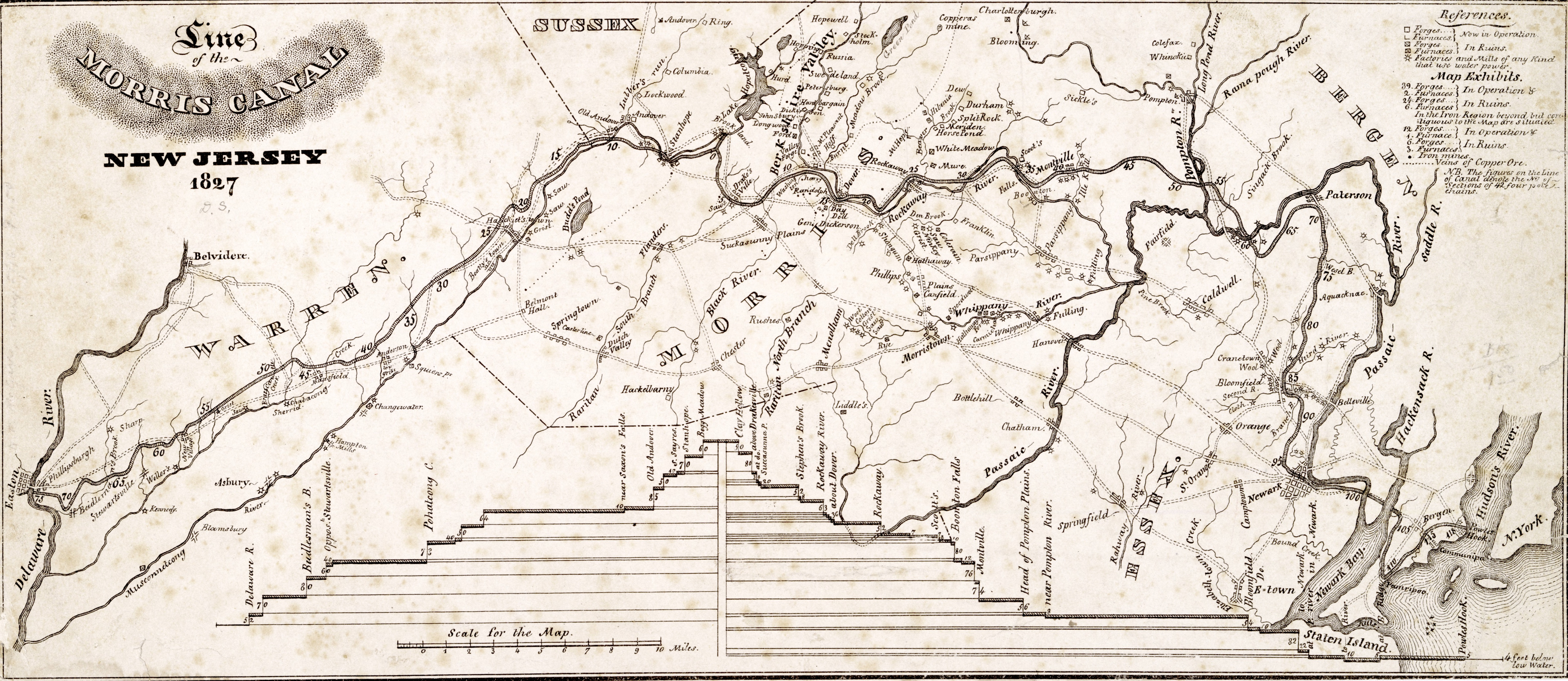
Map of the 107-mile-long (172 km) Morris Canal, which crosses the state

On February 15, 1804, New Jersey became the last northern state to abolish new slavery and enacted legislation that slowly phased out existing slavery. This led to a gradual decrease of the slave population. By the American Civil War's end, about a dozen African Americans in New Jersey were still held in bondage. New Jersey voters eventually ratified the constitutional amendments banning slavery and granting rights to the United States' black population.

Industrialization accelerated in the present-day North Jersey region of the state following completion of the Morris Canal in 1831. The canal allowed for anthracite coal to be transported from eastern Pennsylvania's Lehigh Valley to North Jersey's growing industries in Paterson, Newark, and Jersey City.

In 1844, the second state constitution was ratified and brought into effect. Counties thereby became districts for the state senate, and some realignment of boundaries (including the creation of Mercer County) immediately followed. This provision was retained in the 1947 Constitution, but was overturned by the Supreme Court of the United States in 1962, by the decision Baker v. Carr. While the Governorship was stronger than under the 1776 constitution, the 1844 constitution created many offices that were not responsible to the governor or the people. Furthermore, it limited him to a single three-year term.

New Jersey was one of the few Union states (the others being Delaware and Kentucky) to select a candidate other than Abraham Lincoln twice in national elections, and sided with Stephen A. Douglas (1860) and George B. McClellan (1864) during their campaigns. McClellan, a native Philadelphian, had New Jersey ties and formally resided in New Jersey at the time; he later became Governor of New Jersey (1878–81). During the American Civil War, the state was led by Republican governor Charles Smith Olden and later by Democrat Joel Parker. Between 65,000 and 80,000 state soldiers enlisted in the Union army; unlike many other states, it saw no battles.

In the Industrial Revolution, cities like Paterson grew and prospered. Previously, the economy had been largely agrarian, which was problematically subject to crop failures and poor soil. This caused a shift to a more industrialized economy, one based on manufactured commodities such as textiles and silk. Inventor Thomas Edison also became an important figure of the Industrial Revolution, having been granted 1,093 patents, many of which for inventions he developed while working in New Jersey. Edison's facilities, first at Menlo Park and then in West Orange, are considered perhaps the first research centers in the United States. Christie Street in Menlo Park was the first thoroughfare in the world to have electric lighting. Transportation was greatly improved as locomotion and steamboats were introduced to New Jersey.

Iron mining was also a leading industry during the middle to late 19th century. Bog iron pits in the New Jersey Pine Barrens were among the first sources of iron for the new nation. Mines such as Mt. Hope, Mine Hill, and the Rockaway Valley Mines created a thriving industry. Mining generated the impetus for new towns and was one of the driving forces behind the need for the Morris Canal. Zinc mines were also a major industry, especially the Sterling Hill Mine.

=== 20th century ===
New Jersey prospered through the Roaring Twenties. The first Miss America Pageant was held in 1921 in Atlantic City; the Holland Tunnel connecting Jersey City to Manhattan opened in 1927; and the first drive-in movie was shown in 1933 in Camden. During the Great Depression of the 1930s, the state offered begging licenses to unemployed residents, the zeppelin airship Hindenburg crashed in flames over Lakehurst, and the SS Morro Castle beached itself near Asbury Park after going up in flames while at sea.

Through both World Wars, New Jersey was a center for war production, especially naval construction. The Federal Shipbuilding and Drydock Company yards in Kearny and Newark and the New York Shipbuilding Corporation yard in Camden produced aircraft carriers, battleships, cruisers, and destroyers. New Jersey manufactured 6.8 percent of total United States military armaments produced during World War II, ranking fifth among the 48 states. In addition, Fort Dix (1917) (originally called "Camp Dix"), Camp Merritt (1917), and Camp Kilmer (1941) were all constructed to house and train American soldiers through both World Wars. New Jersey also became a principal location for defense in the Cold War. Fourteen Nike missile stations were constructed for the defense of the New York City and Philadelphia areas. PT-109, a motor torpedo boat commanded by Lt. (j.g.) John F. Kennedy in World War II, was built at the Elco Boatworks in Bayonne. The aircraft carrier USS Enterprise (CV-6) was briefly docked at the Military Ocean Terminal in Bayonne in the 1950s before she was sent to Kearney to be scrapped. In 1962, the world's first nuclear-powered cargo ship, the NS Savannah, was launched at Camden.

In 1951, the New Jersey Turnpike opened, facilitating efficient travel by car and truck between North Jersey and the New York metropolitan area, and South Jersey and the Philadelphia metropolitan area. Subsequently, in 1957, the Garden State Parkway was completed, serving as a diagonal counterpart to the Turnpike, and opening up highway travel along New Jersey's coastal flank between Bergen County in the northeast and the Cape May County peninsula at the southeastern tip of New Jersey; in doing so, the Jersey Shore became readily accessible to millions of residents in the New York metropolitan area. In 1959, Air Defense Command deployed the CIM-10 Bomarc surface-to-air missile to McGuire Air Force Base. On June 7, 1960, an explosion in a CIM-10 Bomarc missile fuel tank caused an accident and subsequent plutonium contamination.

In the 1960s, race riots erupted in many of the industrial cities of North Jersey. The first race riots in New Jersey occurred in Jersey City on August 2, 1964. Several others ensued in 1967, in Newark and Plainfield. Other riots followed the assassination of Martin Luther King Jr. in April 1968, just as in the rest of the country. A riot occurred in Camden in 1971. As a result of an order from the New Jersey Supreme Court to fund schools equitably, the New Jersey legislature passed an income tax bill in 1976. Prior to this bill, the state had no income tax.

=== 21st century ===
In the early part of the 2000s, two light rail systems were opened: the Hudson–Bergen Light Rail (HBLR) in Hudson County and the River Line between Camden and Trenton. The intent of these projects was to encourage transit-oriented development in North Jersey and South Jersey, respectively. The HBLR was credited with a revitalization of Hudson County and Jersey City. Urban revitalization has continued in North Jersey in the 21st century. In 2014, Jersey City's Census-estimated population was 262,146, with the largest population increase of any municipality in New Jersey since 2010, representing an increase of 5.9% from the 2010 U.S. census, when the city's population was enumerated at 247,597. In 2017, Jersey City's tax base grew by US$136 million, giving Jersey City the largest municipal tax base in New Jersey. Between 2000 and 2010 Newark experienced its first population increase since the 1950s, and by 2020 had rebounded to 311,549.

State symbols of New Jersey
List of state symbols
- Flag of New Jersey

- Seal of New Jersey

- Coat of arms of New Jersey

Living insignia
- Bird: Eastern goldfinch
- Butterfly: Black swallowtail
- Fish: Brook trout
- Flower: Viola sororia
- Insect: Western honey bee
- Mammal: Horse
- Tree: Quercus rubra (northern red oak), dogwood (memorial tree)

Inanimate insignia
- Color(s): Buff and blue
- Folk dance: Square dance
- Food: Northern highbush blueberry (state fruit)
- Fossil: Hadrosaurus foulkii
- Soil: Downer

State route marker

State quarter
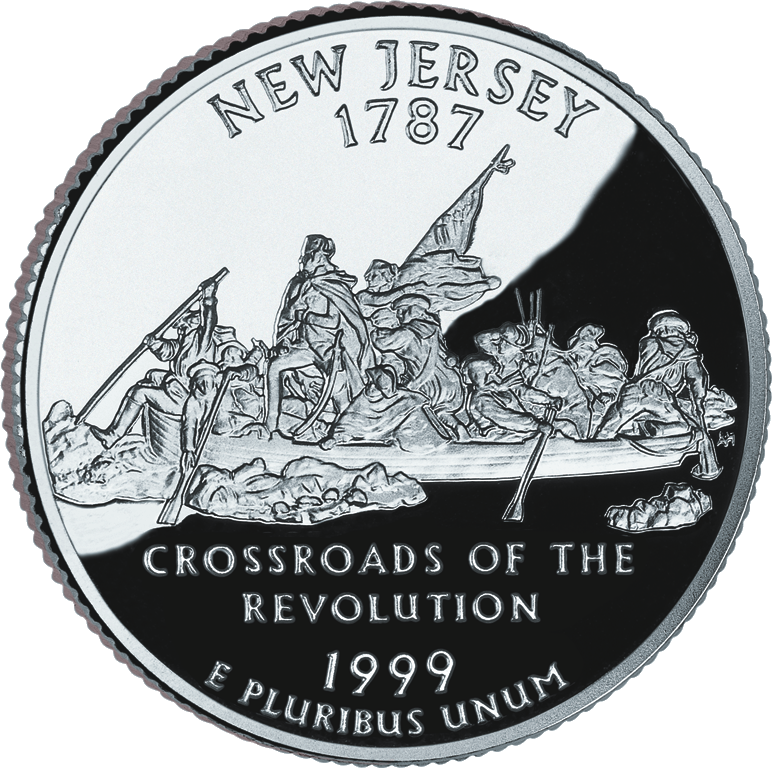
- Released in 1999

== Geography ==
Interactive map of New Jersey

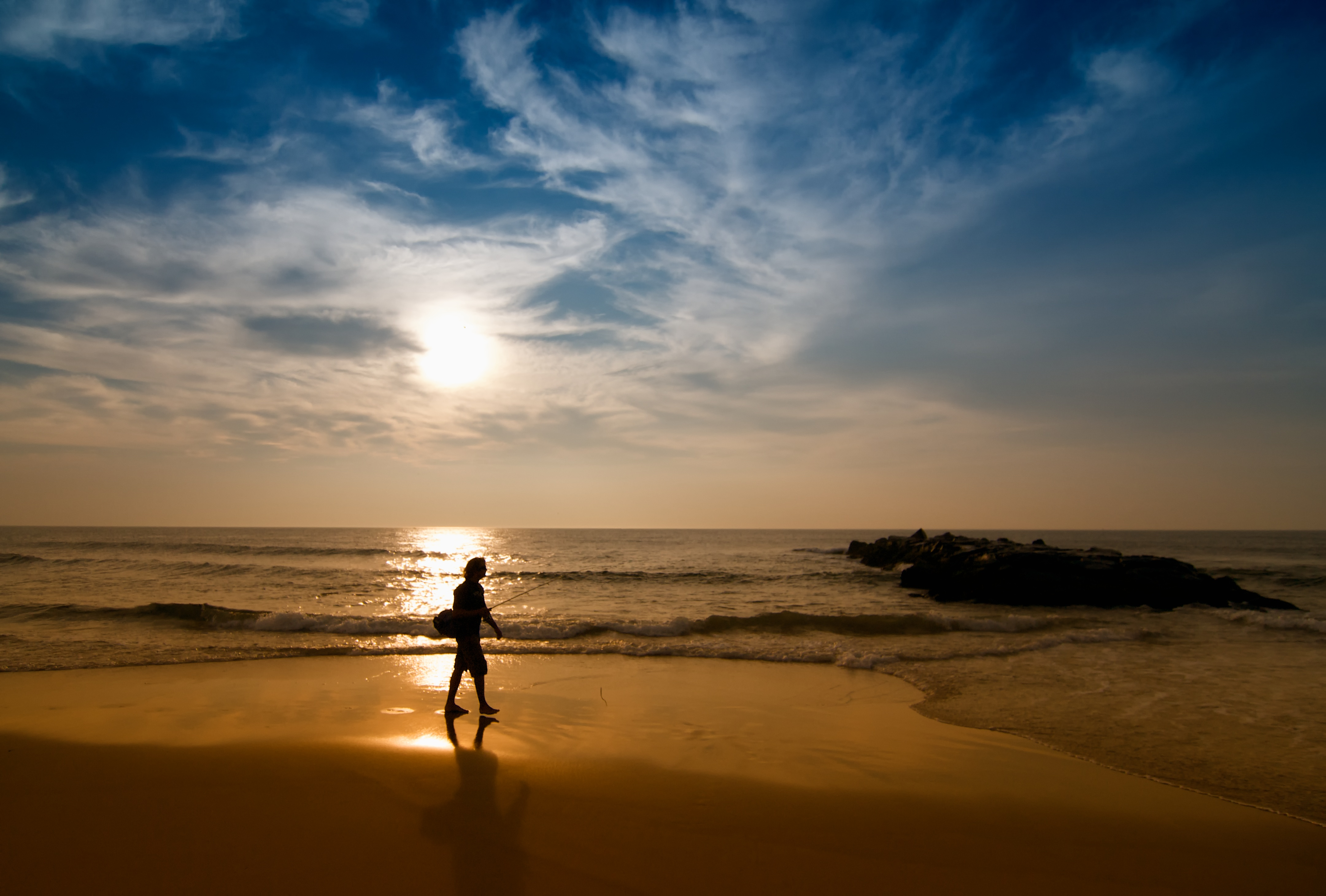

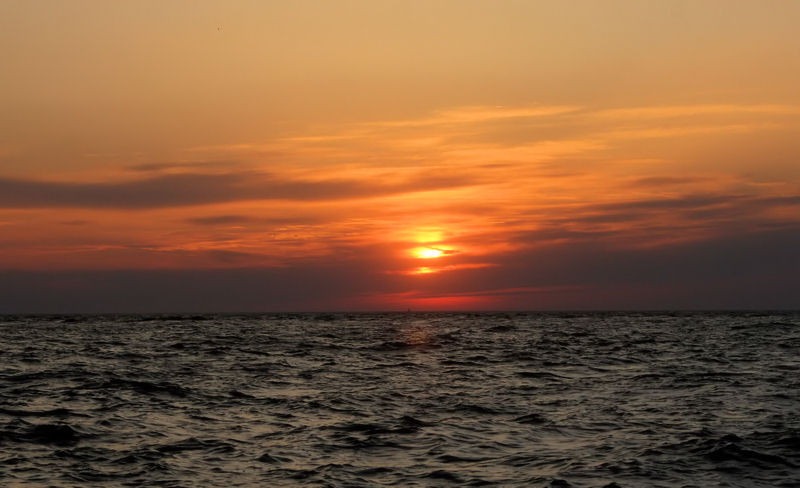
Sunrise on the Jersey Shore at Spring Lake in Monmouth County (top) and sunset at Sunset Beach in Cape May County (bottom)

New Jersey is at the center of the Northeast megalopolis, the most populated American urban agglomeration. It is bordered to the north and northeast by New York (parts of which are across the Hudson River, Upper New York Bay, the Kill Van Kull, Newark Bay, and the Arthur Kill); to the east by the Atlantic Ocean; to the southwest by Delaware across Delaware Bay; and to the west by Pennsylvania across the Delaware River.

New Jersey is broadly divided into the North, Central, and South Jersey geographic regions, although some residents do not consider Central Jersey a region in its own right. Across the regions are five distinct areas divided by natural geography and population concentration. Northeastern New Jersey, often referred to as the Gateway Region, lies closest to Manhattan in New York City, and up to a million residents commute daily into the city for work, many via public transportation. The Jersey Shore, along the Atlantic Coast in Central and South Jersey, has its own unique natural, residential, and cultural characteristics owing to its location by the ocean. South Jersey represents the southernmost geographical region of the northeastern United States. The Philadelphia metropolitan area includes the southwestern counties of the state, which reside within the Delaware Valley surrounding Philadelphia.

Despite the state's heavily urban character and a long history of industrialization, forests cover roughly 45 percent of New Jersey's land area, or approximately 2.1 million acres (8,500 km^{2}), ranking 31st among the 50 U.S. states and six territories. Northwestern New Jersey, often referred to as the Skylands Region, is more wooded, rural, and mountainous. The chief tree of the northern forests is the oak. The New Jersey Pine Barrens is situated in the southern interior of New Jersey and covered extensively by mixed pine and oak forest; its population density is lower than most of the state.

High Point in Montague Township, Sussex County is the state's highest elevation at 1,803 feet (550 m) above sea level. The state's highest prominence is Kitty Ann Mountain in Morris County, rising 892 feet (272 m). The Palisades are a line of steep cliffs on the west side of the Hudson River in Bergen and Hudson Counties. Major New Jersey rivers include the Hudson, Delaware, Raritan, Passaic, Hackensack, Rahway, Musconetcong, Mullica, Rancocas, Manasquan, Maurice, and Toms rivers. Due to New Jersey's peninsular geography, both sunrise and sunset are visible over water from different points on the Jersey Shore.

=== Prominent geographic features ===
- Delaware Water Gap
- Great Bay
- Great Swamp National Wildlife Refuge
- Highlands
- Hudson Palisades
- Jersey Shore
  - On the shore, New Jersey hosts the highest concentration of oceanside boardwalks in the world.
- Meadowlands
- New Jersey Pine Barrens
- Ramapo Mountains
- Watchung Mountains
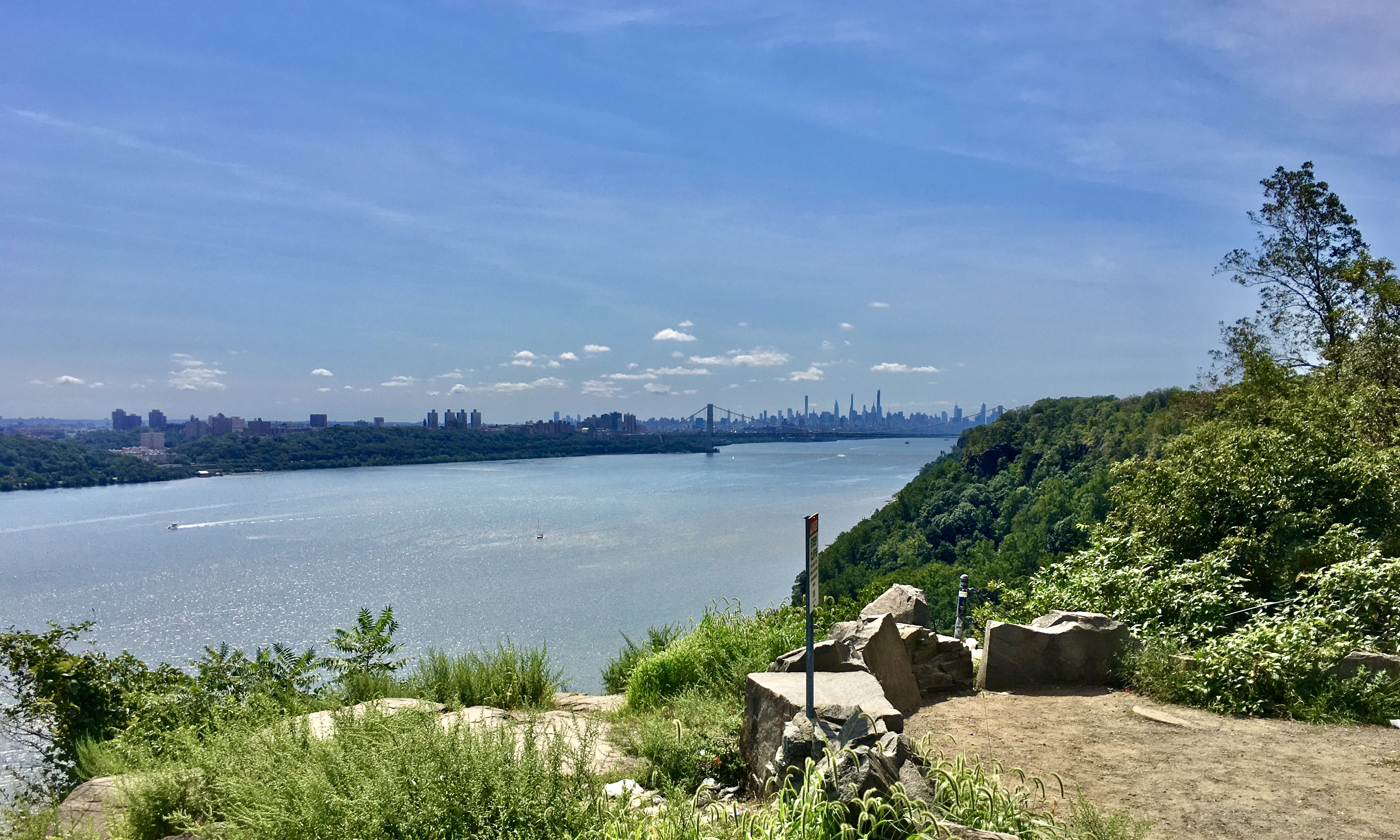
Atop the Hudson Palisades in Englewood Cliffs, Bergen County, overlooking the Hudson River, the George Washington Bridge, and the skyscrapers of Midtown Manhattan, New York City

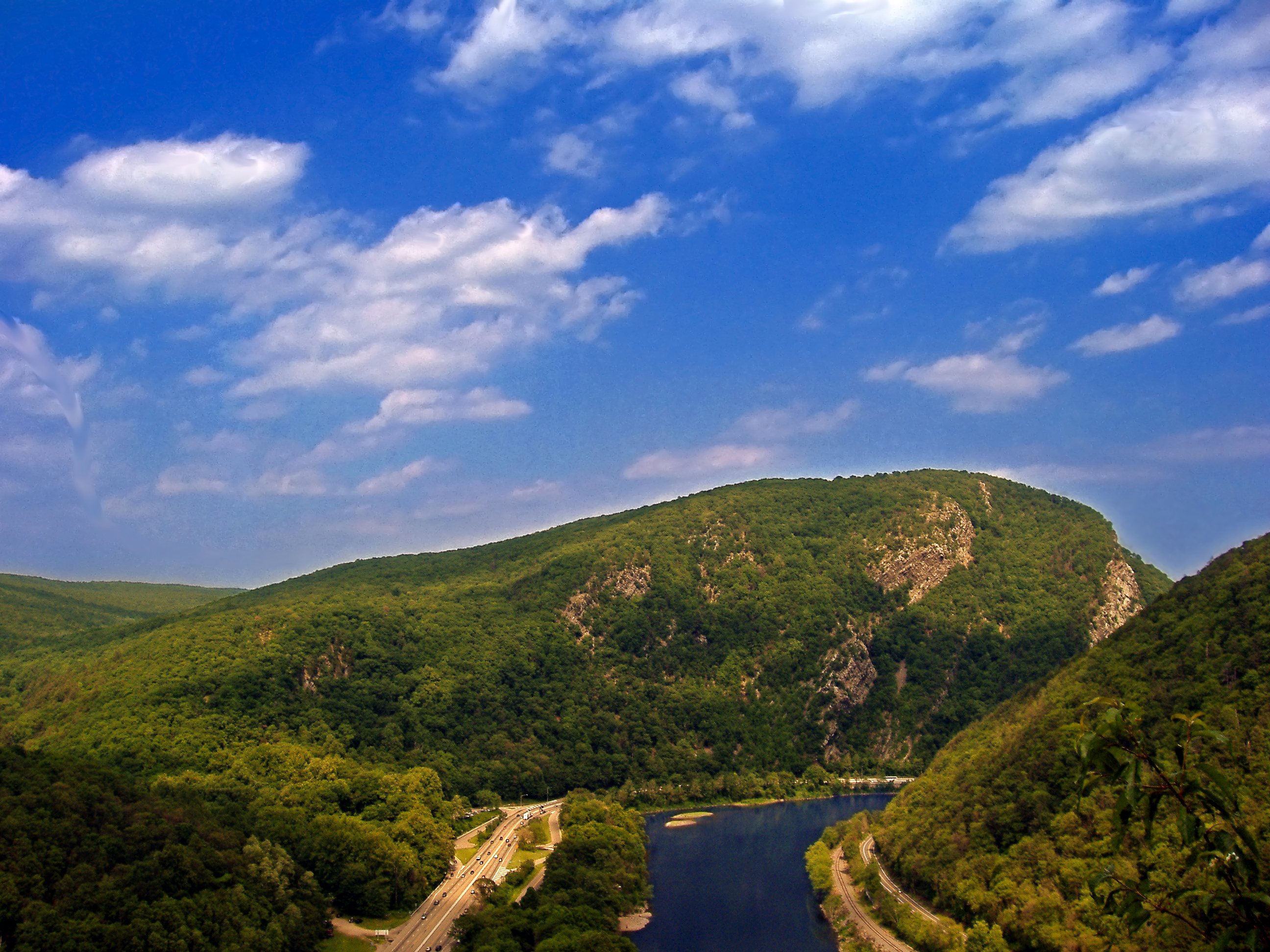
Delaware Water Gap is shared between Warren County and neighboring Pennsylvania.

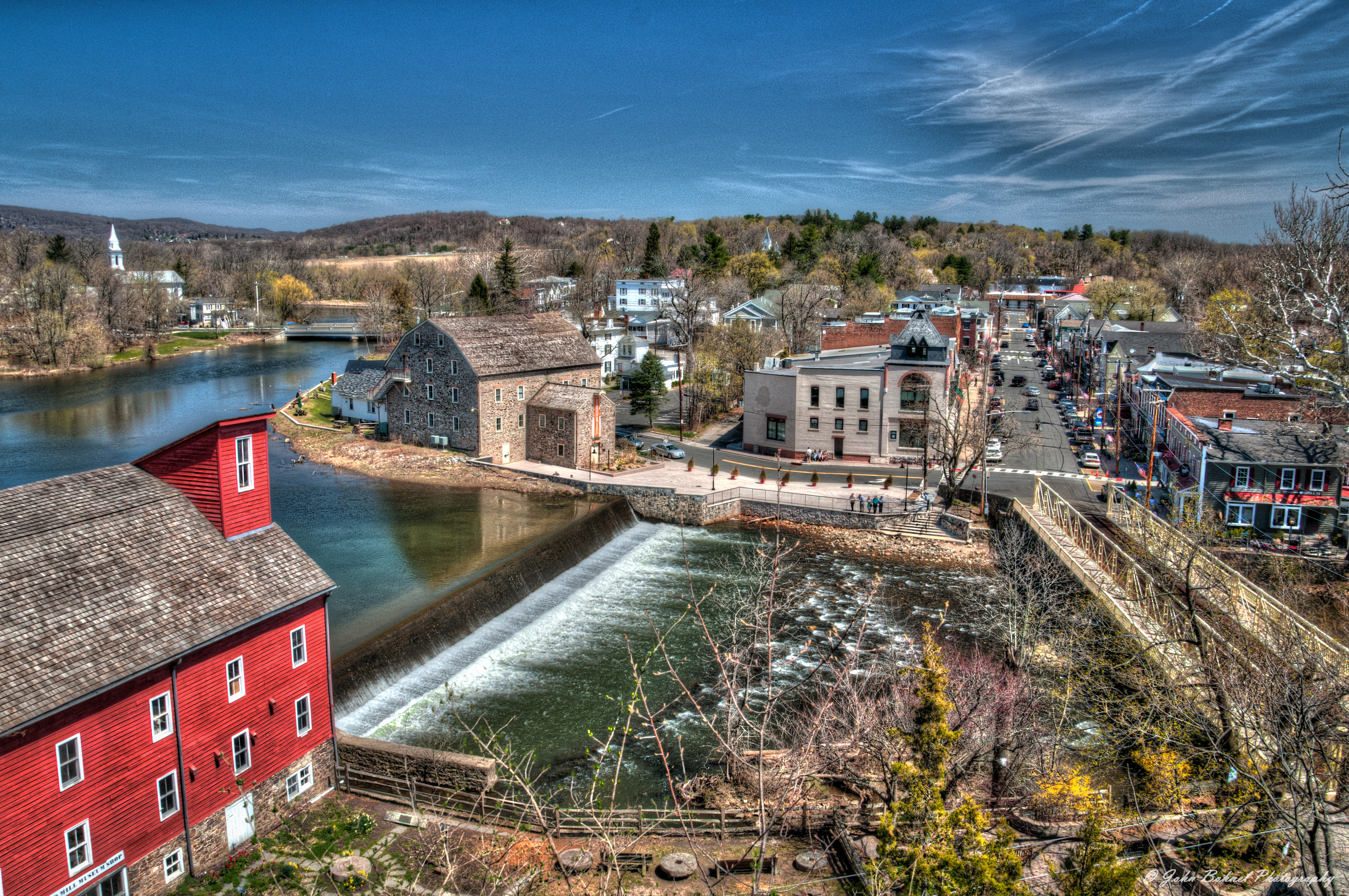
At 69.6 mi (112.0 km) in length, Raritan River is the longest river entirely within New Jersey, flowing from Raritan Valley near Clinton (above), eastward to Raritan Bay and the Atlantic Ocean.

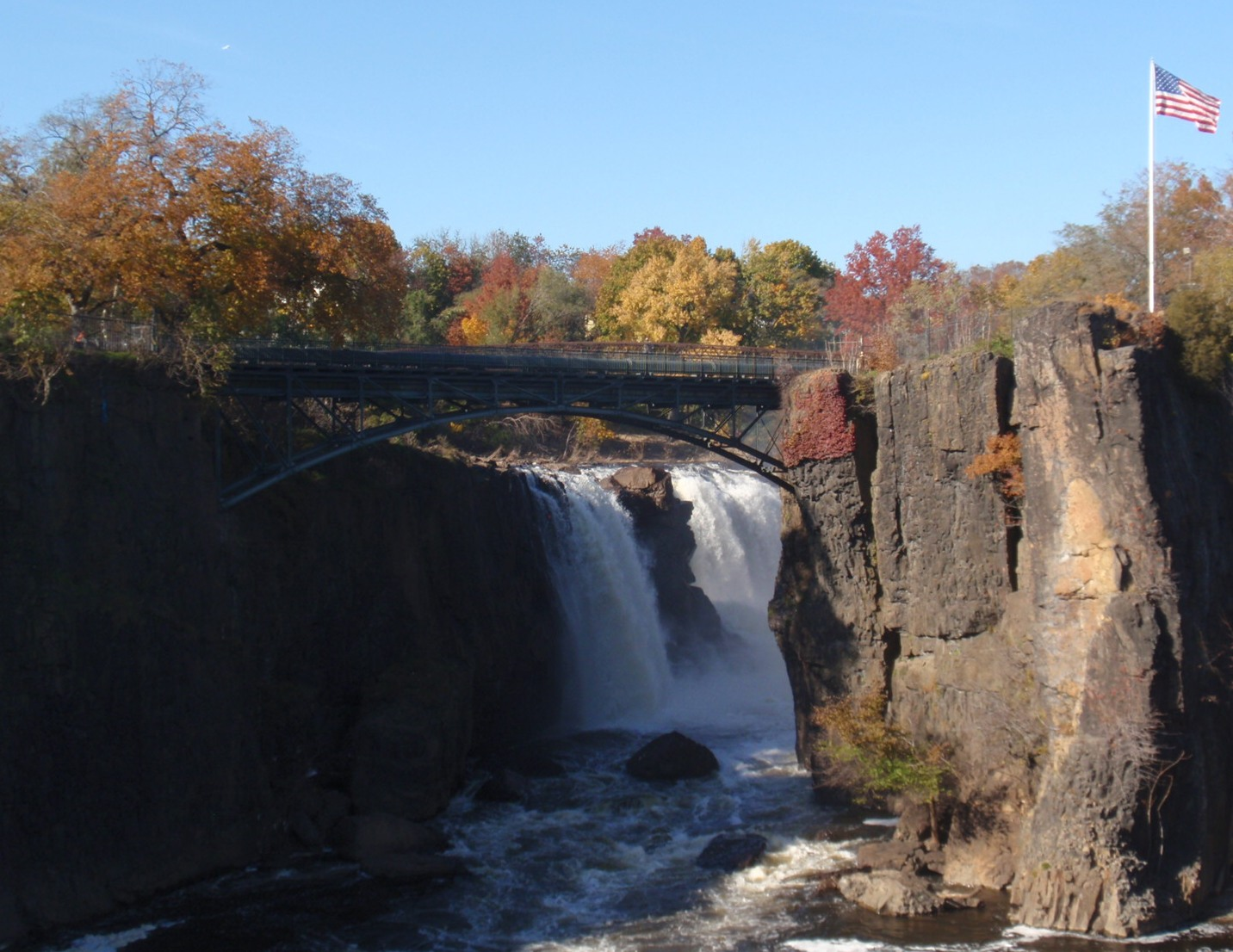
Great Falls of the Passaic River in Paterson was designated a U.S. National Historical Park in 2009.

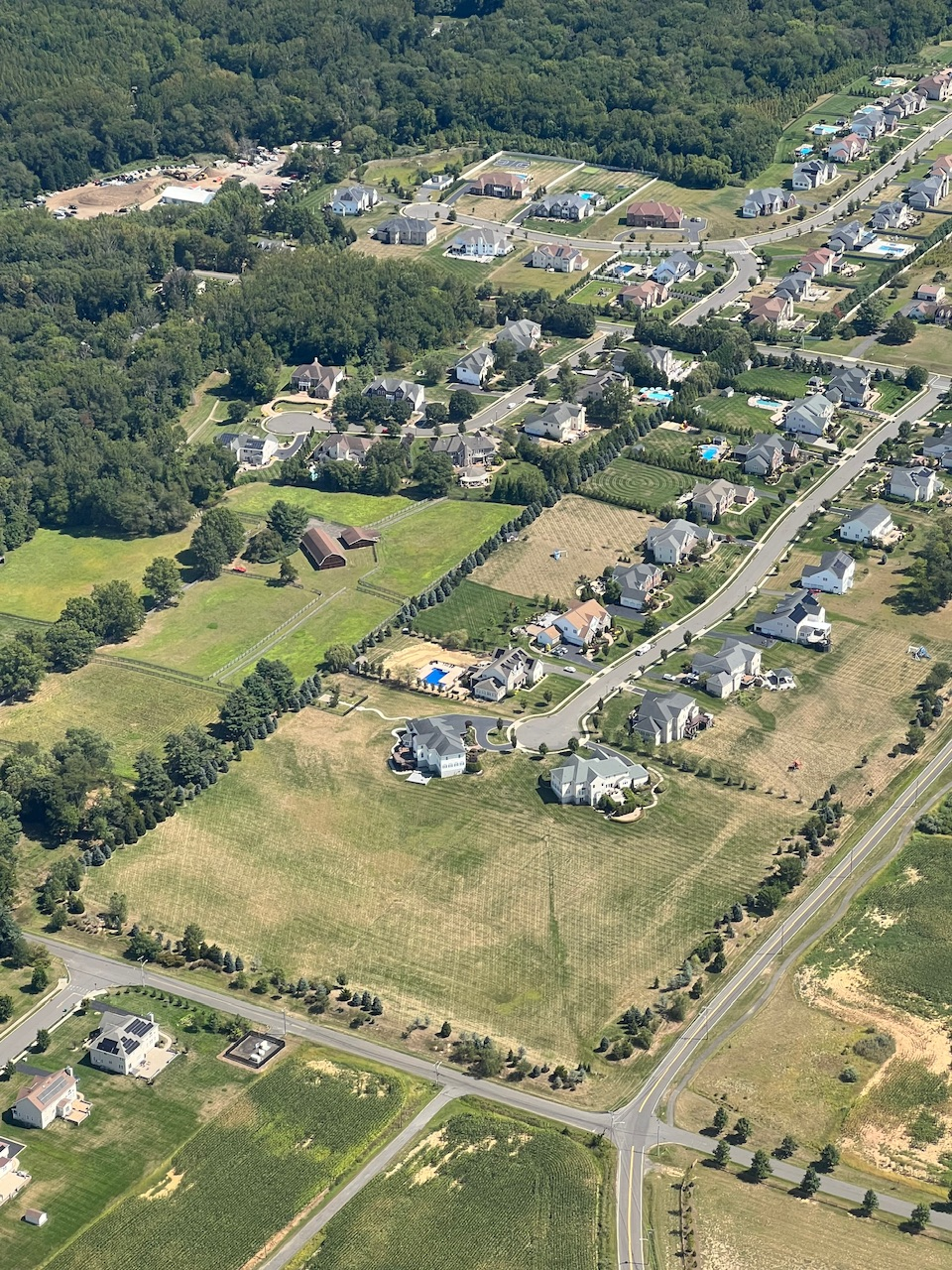
New Jersey suburbia in Monroe Township, Middlesex County. Despite being the most densely populated U.S. state, New Jersey is mostly suburban.

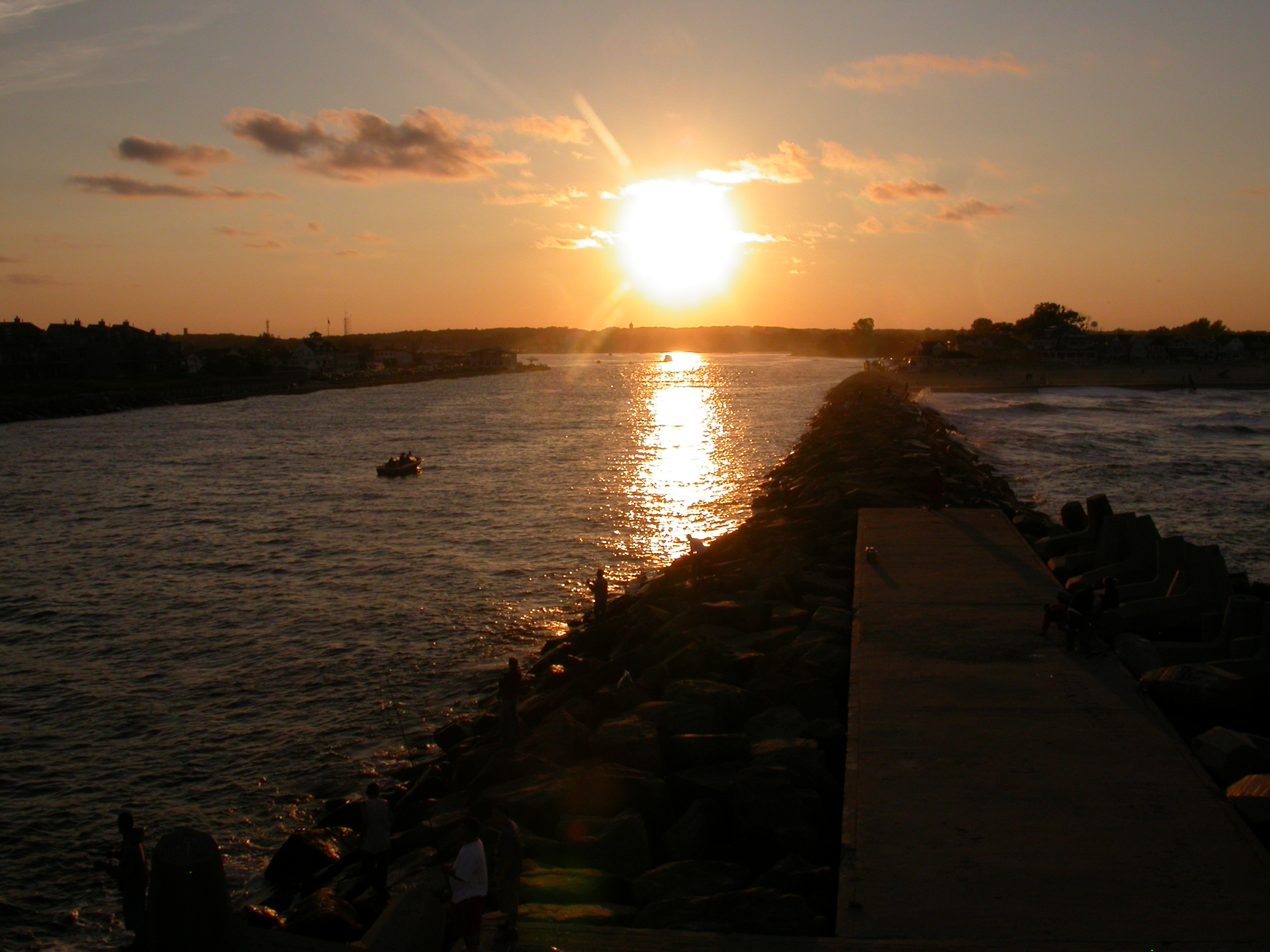
The Jersey Shore extends inland from the Atlantic Ocean into its many inlets, including Manasquan Inlet, looking westward at sunset from the jetty at Manasquan.

=== Climate ===
The state consists of two climate zones; most of the state has a humid subtropical climate (Cfa), while the northwest has a humid continental climate (Dfa). New Jersey receives between 2,400 and 2,800 hours of sunshine annually.

Summers are typically hot and humid, with statewide average high temperatures of 82–87 °F (28–31 °C) and lows of 60–69 °F (16–21 °C); however, temperatures exceed 90 °F (32 °C) on average 25 days each summer, exceeding 100 °F (38 °C) in some years. Winters are usually cold, with average high temperatures of 34–43 °F (1–6 °C) and lows of 16 to 28 °F (−9 to −2 °C) for most of the state, but temperatures can, for brief periods, fall below 10 °F (−12 °C) and sometimes rise above 50 °F (10 °C). Northwestern parts of the state have significantly colder winters with sub-0 °F (−18 °C) being an almost annual occurrence. Spring and autumn may feature wide temperature variations, with lower humidity than summer. The USDA Plant Hardiness Zone classification ranges from 6 in the northwest of the state, to 7B near Cape May. All-time temperature extremes recorded in New Jersey include 110 °F (43 °C) on July 10, 1936, in Runyon, Middlesex County and −34 °F (−37 °C) on January 5, 1904, in River Vale, Bergen County.

Average annual precipitation ranges from 43 to 51 inches (1,100 to 1,300 mm), spread uniformly throughout the year. Average snowfall per winter season ranges from 10–15 inches (25–38 cm) in the south and near the seacoast, 15–30 inches (38–76 cm) in the northeast and central part of the state, to about 40–50 inches (1.0–1.3 m) in the northwestern highlands, but this often varies considerably from year to year. Precipitation falls on an average of 120 days a year, with 25 to 30 thunderstorms, most of which occur during the summer.

During winter and early spring, New Jersey can experience nor'easters, which are capable of causing blizzards or flooding throughout the northeastern United States. Hurricanes and tropical storms, tornadoes, and earthquakes are rare; the state was impacted by a hurricane in 1903, Tropical Storm Floyd in 1999, and Hurricane Sandy in 2012, which made landfall in the state with top winds of 90 mph (145 km/h).

==== Climate change ====
Climate change is affecting New Jersey faster than much of the rest of the United States. Climatologists at the U.S. National Oceanic and Atmospheric Administration have concluded that New Jersey has been the fastest-warming state by average air temperature over a 100-year period beginning in the early 20th century.

Average high and low temperatures in various cities of New Jersey °C (°F)^{[1]}^{[2]}^{[3]}
City	Jan	Feb	Mar	Apr	May	Jun	Jul	Aug	Sep	Oct	Nov	Dec
Sussex	1/−9 (34/16)	3/−8 (38/18)	8/−4 (47/26)	15/2 (59/36)	21/7 (70/45)	25/12 (78/55)	28/16 (82/60)	27/14 (81/58)	23/10 (73/50)	17/4 (62/38)	11/−1 (51/31)	4/−6 (39/22)
Newark	4/−4 (39/24)	6/−3 (42/27)	10/1 (51/34)	17/7 (62/44)	22/12 (72/53)	28/17 (82/63)	30/20 (86/69)	29/20 (84/68)	25/15 (77/60)	18/9 (65/48)	13/4 (55/39)	6/−1 (44/30)
Atlantic City	5/−2 (42/29)	6/−1 (44/31)	10/3 (50/37)	14/8 (58/46)	19/13 (67/55)	24/18 (76/64)	27/21 (81/70)	27/21 (80/70)	24/18 (75/64)	18/11 (65/53)	13/6 (56/43)	8/1 (46/34)
Cape May	6/−2 (42/28)	7/−2 (44/29)	11/2 (51/35)	16/7 (61/44)	21/12 (70/53)	26/17 (79/63)	29/20 (85/68)	29/19 (83/67)	25/16 (78/61)	19/9 (67/50)	14/4 (57/41)	8/0 (47/32)

=== Administrative divisions ===
The United States Census Bureau divides New Jersey's 21 counties into seven metropolitan statistical areas, with 20 counties included in either the New York City or Philadelphia Combined Statistical Area. Warren County is part of the Lehigh Valley metropolitan area based in eastern Pennsylvania.

==== Counties ====
Map of New Jersey counties

The 21 counties in New Jersey, ranked by population in the 2020 United States census, are:

1. Bergen County: 955,732
2. Essex County: 863,728
3. Middlesex County: 863,162
4. Hudson County: 724,854
5. Monmouth County: 643,615
6. Ocean County: 637,229
7. Union County: 575,345
8. Passaic County: 524,118
9. Camden County: 523,485
10. Morris County: 509,285
11. Burlington County: 461,860
12. Mercer County: 387,340
13. Somerset County: 345,361
14. Gloucester County: 302,294
15. Atlantic County: 274,534
16. Cumberland County: 154,152
17. Sussex County: 144,221
18. Hunterdon County: 128,947
19. Warren County: 109,632
20. Cape May County: 95,263
21. Salem County: 64,837

==== Municipalities ====
For its overall population and nation-leading population density, New Jersey is primarily suburban and has a relative paucity of classically large cities. This paradox is most pronounced in Bergen County, the state's most populous county, whose 955,732 residents at the 2020 census inhabited 70 municipalities, of which the most populous is Hackensack, with 46,030 residents. Many urban areas extend far beyond the limits of a single large city, as New Jersey municipalities tend to be geographically small; three of the four largest cities in New Jersey by population have under 20 square miles (52 km^{2}) of land area, and eight of the top ten, including all the top five, have a land area under 30 square miles (78 km^{2}). As of the 2010 United States census, only four municipalities had over 100,000 residents (although Edison and Woodbridge Township came very close); this number increased to seven by the 2020 census.

Largest municipalities in New Jersey by area
Rank	Name	Area (sq.mi.)	Area (km^{2})	County
1	Galloway Township	115.2	298	Atlantic County
2	Hamilton Township	113.0	293	Atlantic County
3	Washington Township	102.9	267	Burlington County
4	Jackson Township	100.1	259	Ocean County
5	Lacey Township	98.5	255	Ocean County
6	Woodland Township	96.4	250	Burlington County
7	Maurice River Township	95.7	248	Cumberland County
8	Middle Township	83.1	215	Cape May County
9	Manchester Township	82.9	215	Ocean County
10	West Milford	80.4	208	Passaic County
11	Bass River Township	78.2	203	Burlington County
12	Egg Harbor Township	75.0	194	Atlantic County
13	Little Egg Harbor Township	73.2	190	Ocean County
14	Lower Alloways Creek Township	72.6	188	Salem County
15	Vernon Township	70.5	183	Sussex County
16	Upper Township	68.5	177	Cape May County
17	Wantage Township	67.5	175	Sussex County
18	Dennis Township	64.3	167	Cape May County
19	Pemberton Township	62.5	162	Burlington County
20	Howell Township	61.0	158	Monmouth County
21	Middletown Township	59.3	154	Monmouth County
22	Hopewell Township	58.7	152	Mercer County
23	Winslow Township	58.1	150	Camden County
24	Mullica Township	56.9	147	Atlantic County
25	Berkeley Township	55.8	145	Ocean County
26	Hillsborough Township	54.8	142	Somerset County
26	Stafford Township	54.8	142	Ocean County

Largest cities or towns in New Jersey Source:
Rank	Name	County	Pop.
1	Newark	Essex	311,549
2	Jersey City	Hudson	292,449
3	Paterson	Passaic	159,732
4	Elizabeth	Union	137,298
5	Lakewood Township	Ocean	135,158
6	Edison	Middlesex	107,588
7	Woodbridge Township	Middlesex	103,639
8	Toms River	Ocean	95,438
9	Hamilton Township	Mercer	92,297
10	Clifton	Passaic	90,296

== Demographics ==
=== Population ===
Historical population
Census	Pop.	Note	%±
1790	184,139		—
1800	211,149		14.7%
1810	245,562		16.3%
1820	277,575		13.0%
1830	320,823		15.6%
1840	373,306		16.4%
1850	489,555		31.1%
1860	672,035		37.3%
1870	906,096		34.8%
1880	1,131,116		24.8%
1890	1,444,933		27.7%
1900	1,883,669		30.4%
1910	2,537,167		34.7%
1920	3,155,900		24.4%
1930	4,041,334		28.1%
1940	4,160,165		2.9%
1950	4,835,329		16.2%
1960	6,066,782		25.5%
1970	7,168,164		18.2%
1980	7,364,823		2.7%
1990	7,730,188		5.0%
2000	8,414,350		8.9%
2010	8,791,894		4.5%
2020	9,288,994		5.7%
2025 (est.)	9,548,215		2.8%

Residents of New Jersey are most commonly referred to as New Jerseyans or, less commonly, as New Jerseyites. According to the 2020 U.S. census, the state had a population of 9,288,994, a 5.7% increase since the 2010 U.S. census, which counted 8,791,894 residents. The state ranked eleventh in the country by total population and first in population density, with 1,185 residents per square mile (458 per km^{2}). Historically, New Jersey has experienced one of the fastest growth rates in the country, with its population increasing by double digits almost every decade until 1980; growth has since slowed but remained relatively robust until recently. In 2022, the Census Bureau estimated there were 6,262 fewer residents than in 2020, a decline of 0.3% from 2020, related to the COVID-19 pandemic. In 2024, the Census Bureau reported that the state population rebounded by 2.3% or 211,837 residents from April 2020. New Jersey lead the Northeast with a 1.3% growth rate or 121,209 residents from 2023 placing it among the top ten states nationwide for population growth.

New Jersey is the only state where every county is deemed urban as defined by the Census Bureau. Most residents live in the counties surrounding New York City, the nation's largest city, Philadelphia, the nation's sixth-largest city, or along the eastern Jersey Shore; the extreme southern and northwestern counties are relatively less dense overall. Since the 2000 census, the United States Census Bureau calculated that New Jersey's center of population was located in East Brunswick. The state is located in the middle of the Northeast megalopolis, which has more than 50 million residents.

As of 2023, New Jersey had a median household income of $99,781, the second-highest of any U.S. state behind Massachusetts. Conversely, New Jersey's poverty rate of 9.4% was slightly lower than the national average of 11.4%, and the sixth lowest of the fifty states, Washington, D.C., and Puerto Rico. This is attributed to several factors, including the state's proximity to the major economic centers of New York City and Philadelphia, its hosting the highest number of millionaires both per capita and per square mile in the U.S., and the fact that it has the most scientists and engineers per square mile in the world.

According to the U.S. Department of Housing and Urban Development's 2022 Annual Homeless Assessment Report, there were an estimated 8,752 homeless people in New Jersey. The top countries of origin for New Jersey's immigrants in 2018 were India, Dominican Republic, Mexico, Ecuador, and the Philippines.

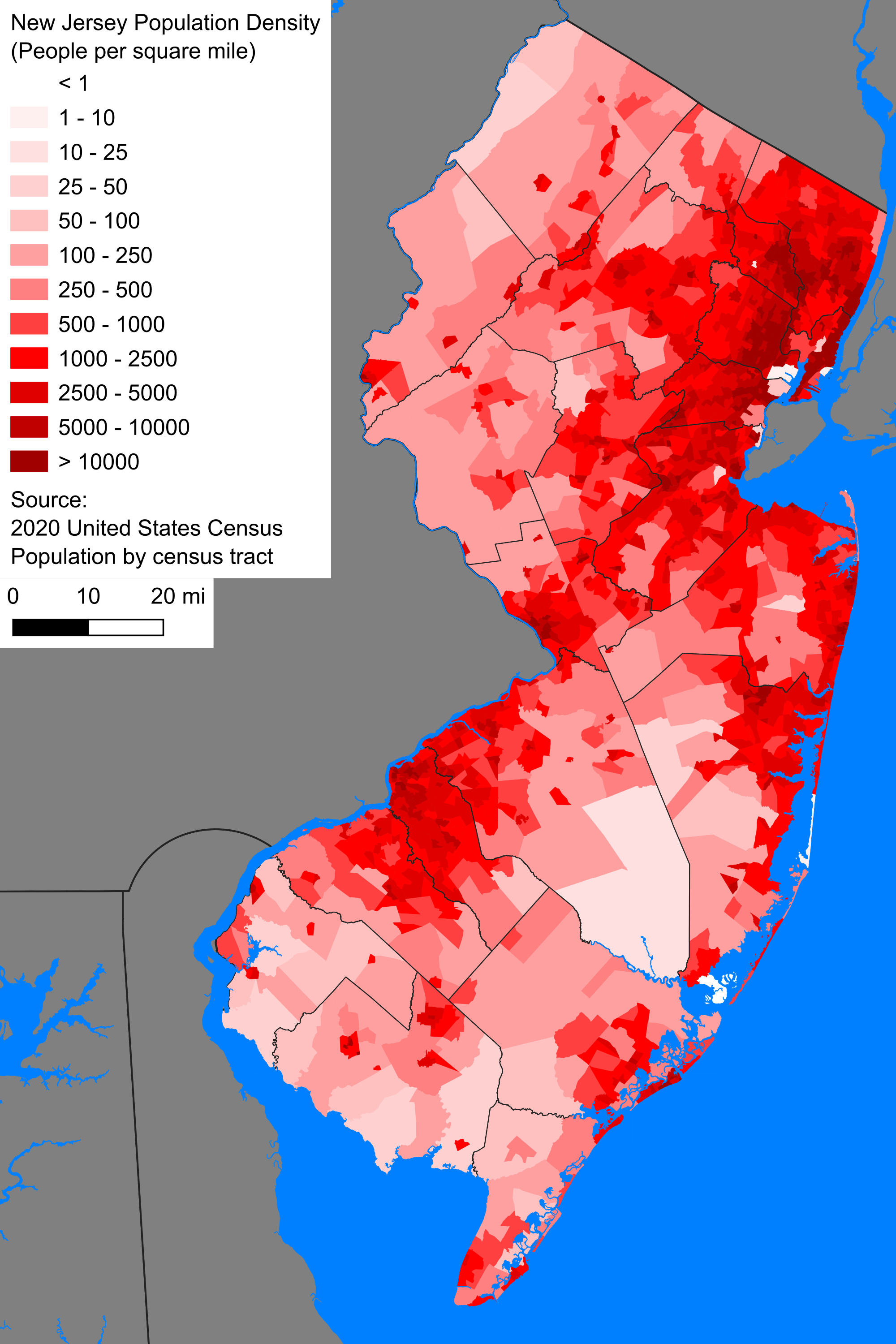
New Jersey population density as of 2020

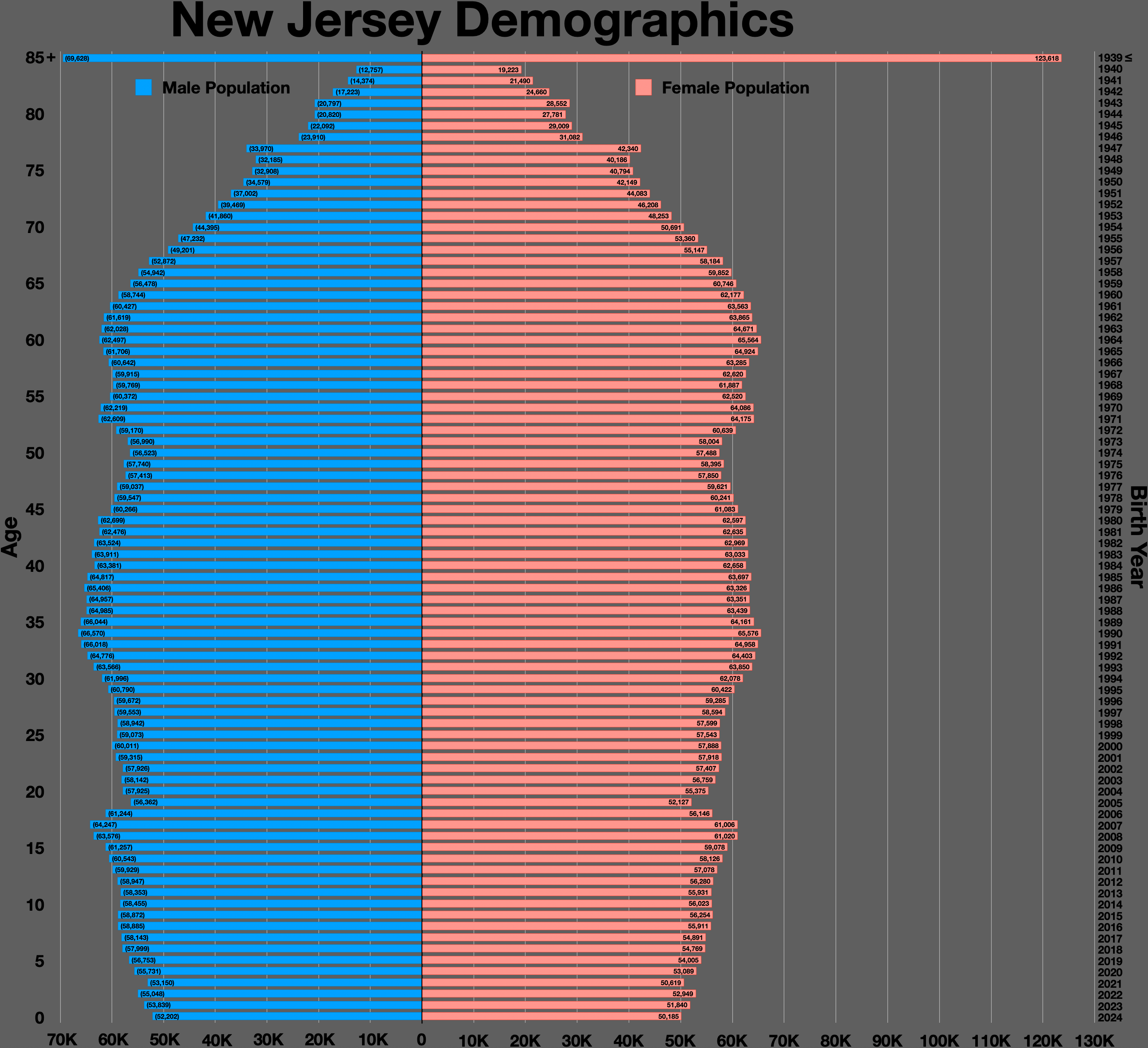
New Jersey population pyramid

=== Race and ethnicity ===
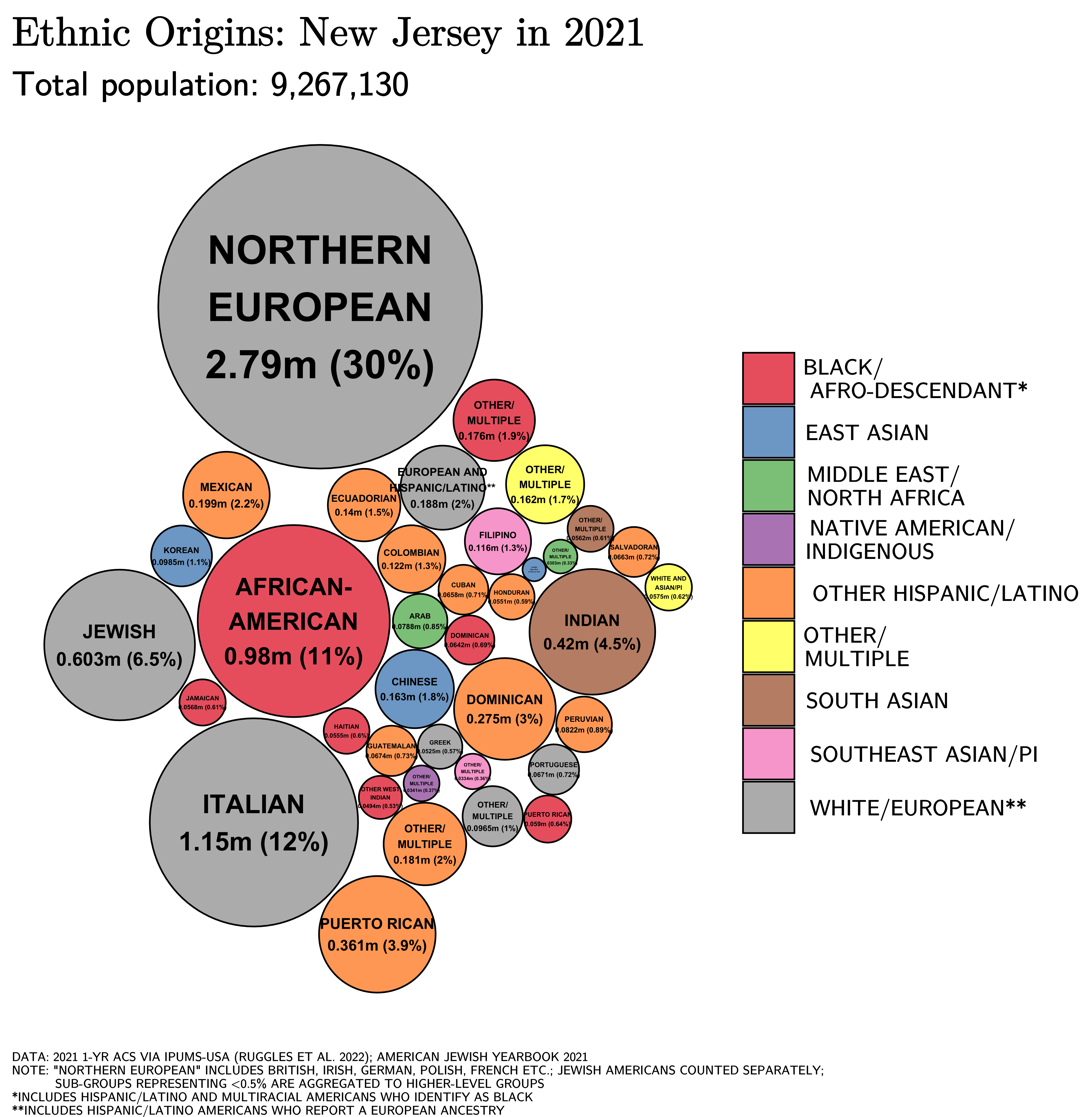
Ethnic origins in New Jersey

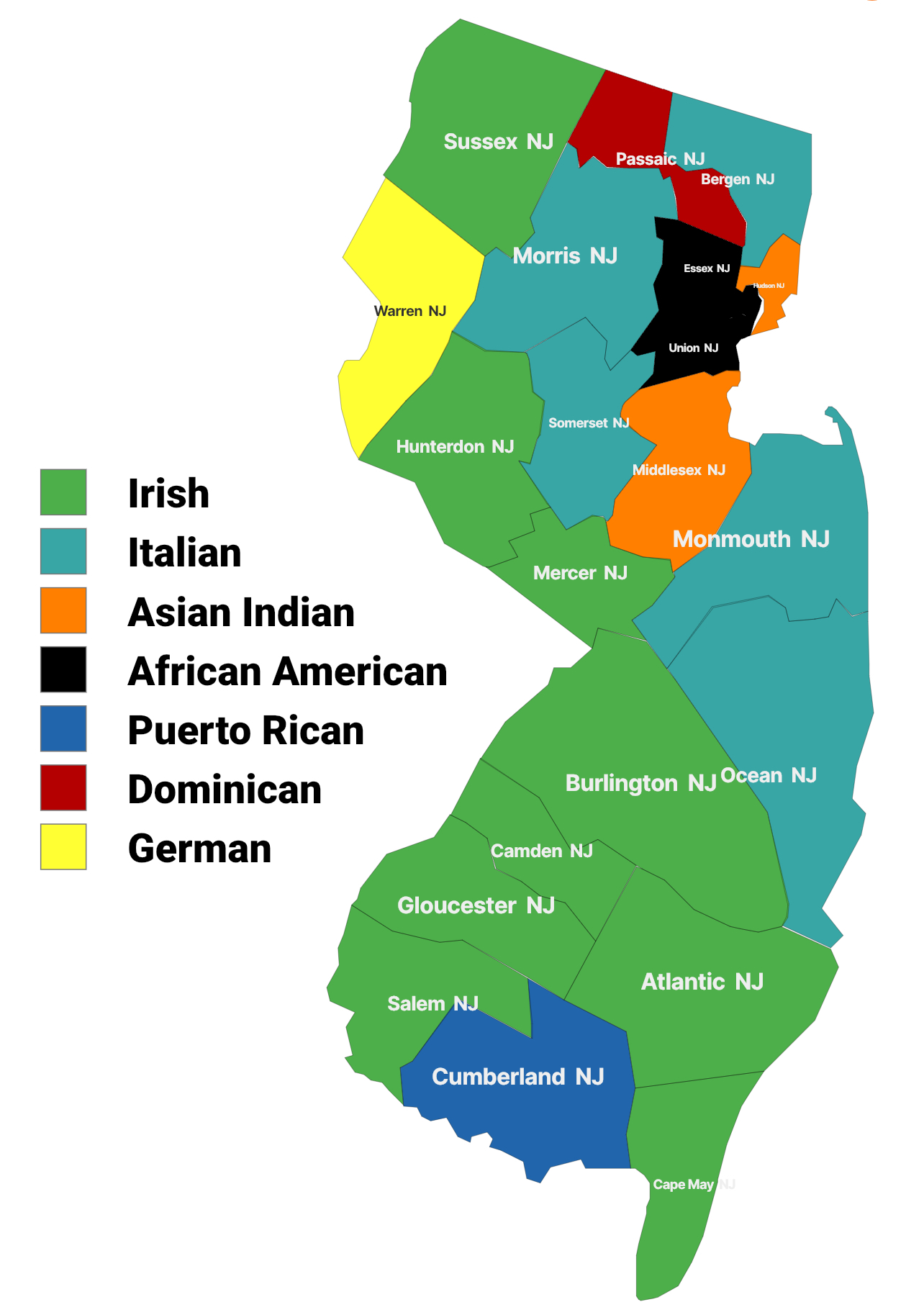
Largest alone or in any combination ethnic origin by county in New Jersey, per the 2020 census

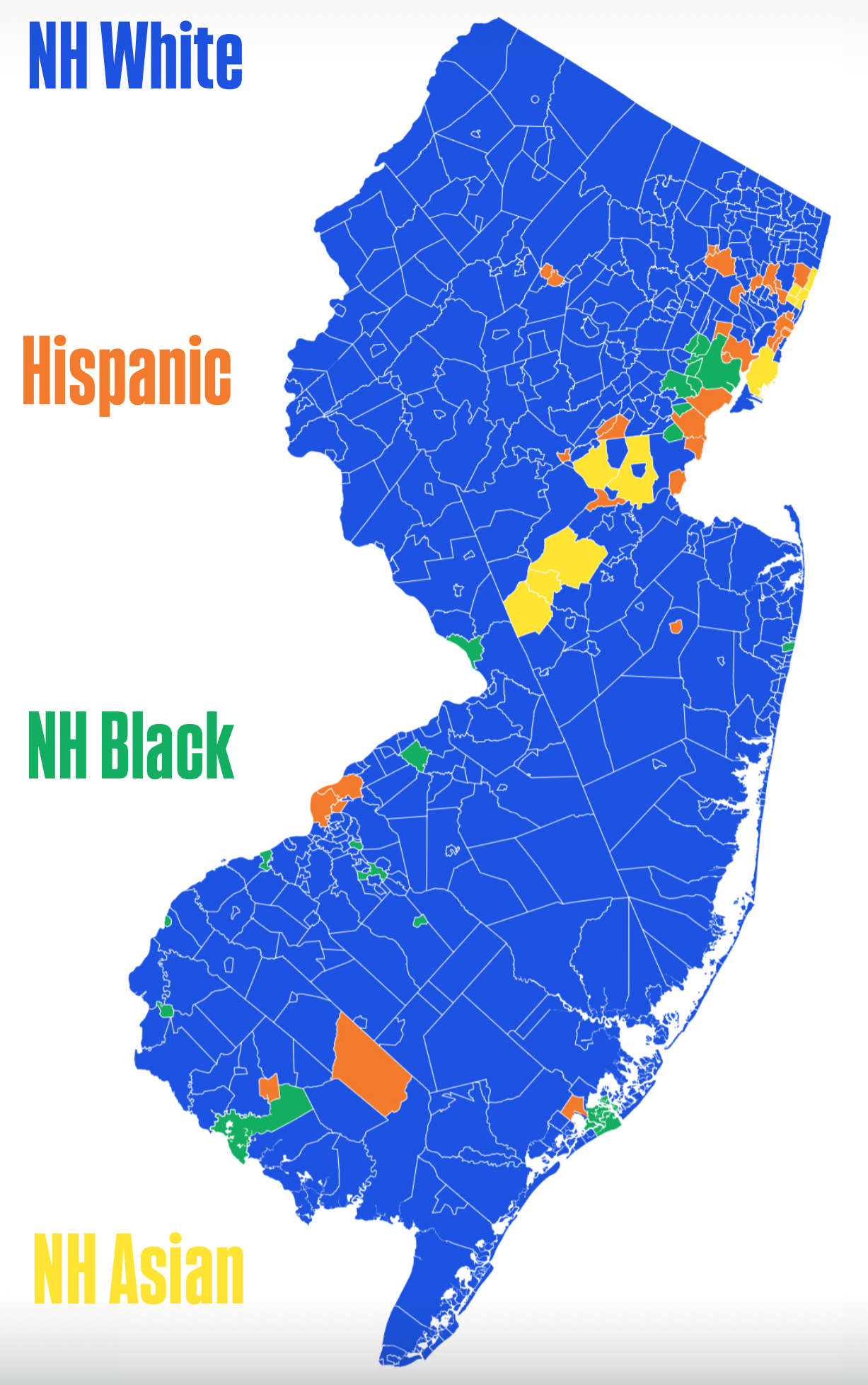
Largest ethnicity by municipality based on 2020 census

New Jersey is one of the most ethnically diverse states in the United States: as of 2022, over one-fifth (21.5%) of its residents are Hispanic or Latino, 15.3% are Black, and one-tenth are Asian. One in four New Jerseyans were born abroad and more than one million (12.1%) are not fully fluent in English. As of the 2024 census estimate, the White non-Hispanic population of the state was less than 50%, making it a majority-minority state. Compared to the U.S. as a whole, the state is more racially and ethnically diverse and has a higher proportion of immigrants.

Ethnic composition as of the 2020 census
Race and ethnicity	Alone	Total
White (non-Hispanic)	51.9%	54.5%
Hispanic or Latino (Note: Persons of Hispanic or Latino origin are not distinguished between total and partial ancestry.)	—	21.6%
African American (non-Hispanic)	12.4%	13.6%
Asian	10.2%	11.0%
Native American	0.1%	0.7%
Pacific Islander	0.02%	0.1%
Other	0.8%	1.8%

Map of counties in New Jersey by racial plurality, per the 2020 census Legend: | Non-Hispanic White 30–40% 40–50% 50–60% 60–70% 70–80% 80–90% | Black or African American 40–50% Hispanic or Latino 40–50% |

New Jersey – racial and ethnic composition Note: the US Census treats Hispanic/Latino as an ethnic category. This table excludes Latinos from the racial categories and assigns them to a separate category. Hispanics/Latinos may be of any race.
Race / Ethnicity (NH = Non-Hispanic)	Pop 1960	Pop 1970	Pop 1980	Pop 1990	Pop 2000	Pop 2010	Pop 2020	% 1960	% 1970	% 1980	% 1990	% 2000	% 2010	% 2020
White alone (NH)	6,066,782	6,349,908	5,825,538	5,718,966	5,557,209	5,214,878	4,816,381	91.30%	88.58%	79.10%	73.98%	66.04%	59.31%	51.85%
Black or African American alone (NH)	514,875	770,292	907,554	984,845	1,096,171	1,125,401	1,154,142	8.49%	10.75%	12.32%	12.74%	13.03%	12.80%	12.42%
Native American or Alaska Native alone (NH)	1,699	4,706	8,394	12,490	11,338	12,227	11,206	0.03%	0.07%	0.11%	0.16%	0.13%	0.14%	0.12%
Asian alone (NH)	8,778	23,333	103,848	264,341	477,012	719,827	942,921	0.14%	0.33%	1.41%	3.42%	5.67%	8.19%	10.15%
Native Hawaiian or Pacific Islander alone (NH)	x	x	x	x	2,175	1,963	1,944	x	x	x	x	0.03%	0.02%	0.02%
Other race alone (NH)	2,427	19,925	27,606	9,685	19,565	27,610	70,354	0.04%	0.28%	0.37%	0.13%	0.23%	0.31%	0.76%
Mixed-race or multiracial (NH)	x	x	x	x	133,689	134,844	289,471	x	x	x	x	1.59%	1.53%	3.12%
Hispanic or Latino (any race)	x	x	491,883	739,861	1,117,191	1,555,144	2,002,575	x	x	6.68%	9.57%	13.28%	17.69%	21.56%
Total	6,066,782	7,168,164	7,364,823	7,730,188	8,414,350	8,791,894	9,288,994	100.00%	100.00%	100.00%	100.00%	100.00%	100.00%	100.00%

==== 2024 American Community Survey one-year estimates ====
Racial makeup of New Jersey (2024): 1. White alone (52.3%); 2. Black alone (12.9%); 3. Native American alone (0.71%); 4. Asian alone (10.7%); 5. Pacific Islander alone (0.04%); 6. Some other race alone (11.3%); 7. Two or more races (12.1%)	Racial/Ethnic makeup of New Jersey excluding Hispanics from racial categories (2024); NH=Non-Hispanic: 1. White NH (49.5%); 2. Black NH (12.2%); 3. Native American NH (0.07%); 4. Asian NH (10.5%); 5. Pacific Islander NH (0.00%); 6. Some other race NH (0.71%); 7. Two or more races NH (3.52%); 8. Hispanic any race (23.5%)	Racial makeup of Hispanics in New Jersey (2024): 1. White alone (12.1%); 2. Black alone (3.11%); 3. Native American alone (2.73%); 4. Asian alone (0.53%); 5. Pacific Islander alone (0.04%); 6. Some other race alone (45.1%); 7. Two or more races (36.4%)

Metropolitan statistical areas and divisions of New Jersey; those shaded in blue are part of the New York City Metropolitan Area, including Mercer and Warren counties. Counties shaded in green, including Atlantic, Cape May, and Cumberland counties, belong to the Philadelphia Metropolitan Area.

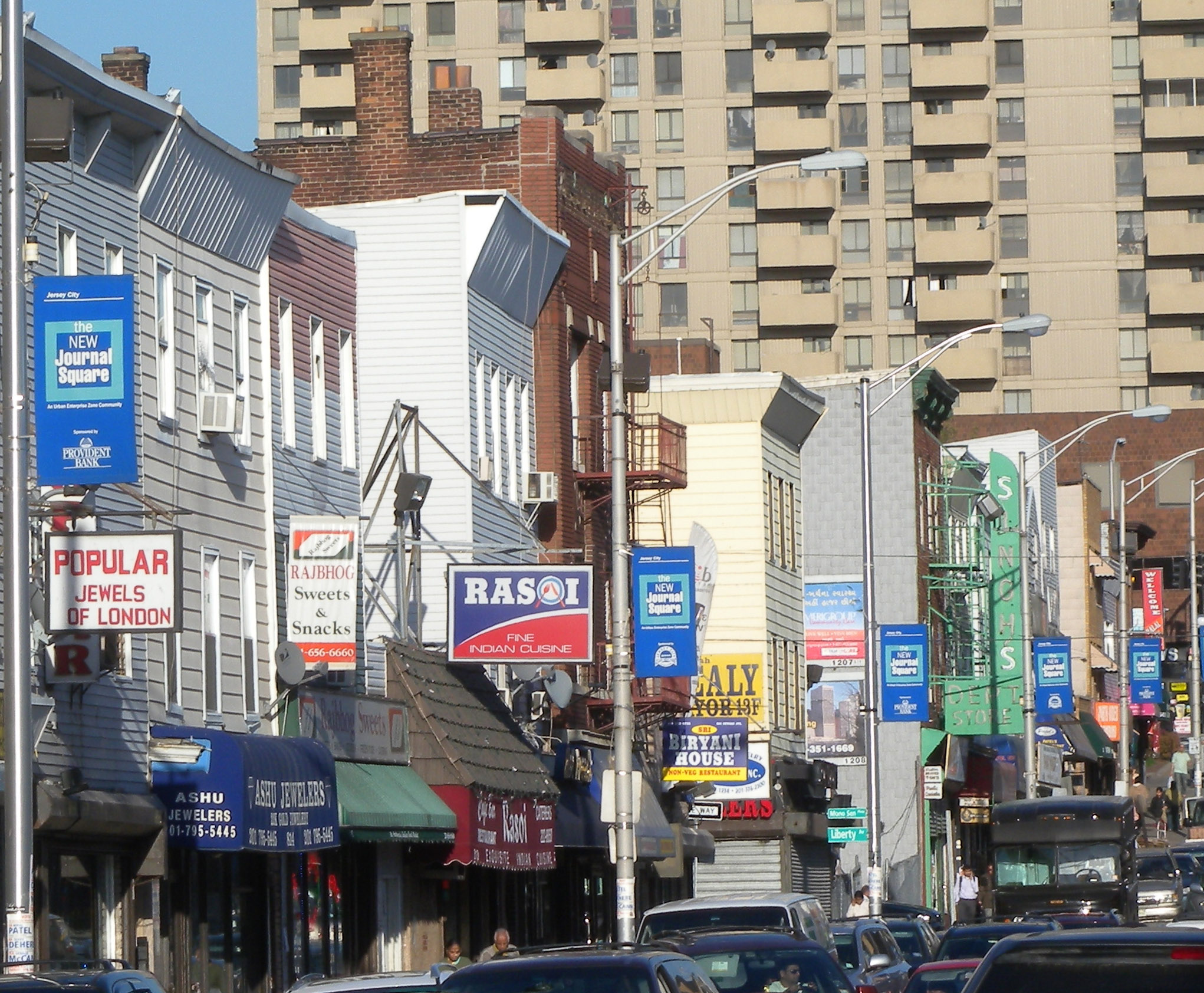
India Square in the Marion Section of Jersey City is home to the highest concentration of Asian Indians in the Western Hemisphere.

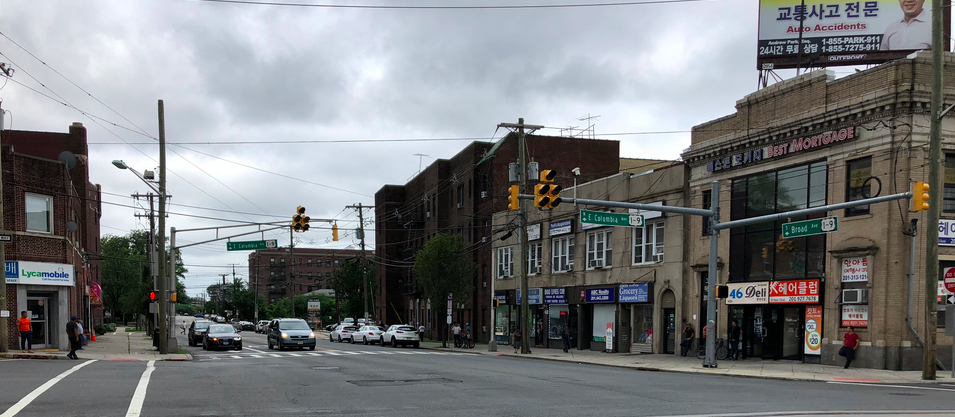
Koreatown, Bergen County, across the George Washington Bridge from New York City

New Jersey is home to roughly half a million undocumented immigrants, comprising an estimated 6.2% of the population, which in 2018 was the fifth-highest percentage of any U.S. state. The municipalities of Camden, Jersey City, and Newark are considered sanctuary cities for illegal immigrants.

For further information on various ethnoracial groups and neighborhoods prominently featured within New Jersey, see the following articles:

- History of the Jews in New Jersey
- Hispanics and Latinos in New Jersey
- Indians in the New York City metropolitan region
- Chinese in the New York City metropolitan region
- List of U.S. cities with significant Korean American populations
- Filipinos in the New York City metropolitan region
- Filipinos in New Jersey
- Russians in the New York City metropolitan region
- Bergen County
- Jersey City
- India Square in Jersey City, home to the highest concentration of Asian Indians in the Western Hemisphere
- Ironbound, a Portuguese and Brazilian enclave in Newark
- Five Corners, a Filipino enclave in Jersey City
- Havana on the Hudson, a Cuban enclave in Hudson County
- Koreatown, Fort Lee, a Korean enclave in southeast Bergen County
- Koreatown, Palisades Park, also a Korean enclave in southeast Bergen County
- Little Bangladesh, a Bangladeshi enclave in Paterson
- Little India (Edison/Iselin), the largest and most diverse South Asian hub in the United States
- Little Istanbul, also known as Little Ramallah, a Middle Eastern enclave in Paterson
- Little Lima, a Peruvian enclave in Paterson

New Jersey is one of the most ethnically and religiously diverse states in the United States. As of 2024, a quarter of New Jerseyans (25%) were foreign born, the second most after California, compared to the national average of 14.8%. As of 2011, 56.4% of New Jersey's children under the age of one belonged to racial or ethnic minority groups, meaning that they had at least one parent who was not non-Hispanic white. The 2019 Vintage Year Census estimated that the state's ethnic makeup was as follows: 71.9% White alone, 15.1% Black or African American alone, 10.0% Asian alone, 0.6% American Indian and Alaska Native alone, 0.1% Native Hawaiian and Other Pacific Islander alone, and 2.3% Two or more races. Hispanic or Latino accounted for 20.9%, while White alone (non-Hispanic or Latino) accounted for 54.6% of the population. Many of the municipalities in Bergen County, New Jersey, the state's largest county, have a sizeable minority population of Hispanics and Asians. There are also three state-recognized tribes, and in 2020, 51,186 identified as being Native American alone, while 96,691 did in combination with one or more other races.

New Jersey hosts some of the nation's largest communities of religious and ethnic minorities in proportional or absolute terms. It has the second-largest Jewish population by percentage (after New York); the largest Hindu and Muslim populations by percentage; the largest population of Peruvians in the U.S.; the largest population of Cubans outside Florida; the third-highest Asian population by percentage; and the second-highest Italian population, according to the 2000 census. African Americans, Hispanics (Puerto Ricans and Dominicans), West Indians, Arabs, and Brazilian and Portuguese Americans are also high in number. New Jersey also has the fourth-largest Filipino population, and fourth-largest Chinese population, per the 2010 U.S. Census.

New Jersey has the-third highest Indian population of any state by absolute numbers and the highest by percentage, with India Square in Jersey City, Hudson County hosting the highest concentration of Asian Indians in the Western Hemisphere. A study by the Pew Research Center found that in 2013, New Jersey was the only U.S. state in which immigrants born in India constituted the largest foreign-born nationality, representing roughly 10% of all foreign-born residents in the state. Central New Jersey, particularly Edison and surrounding Middlesex County, has the highest concentration of Indians, at nearly 20% in 2020; Little India is the largest and most diverse South Asian cultural hub in the United States. The area includes a sprawling Chinatown and Koreatown running along New Jersey Route 27. Monroe Township in Middlesex County has experienced a particularly rapid growth rate in its Indian American population with an estimated 5,943 (13.6%) as of 2017, which was 23 times the 256 (0.9%) counted at the 2000 Census; Diwali is celebrated by the township as a Hindu holiday. In Middlesex County, election ballots are printed in English, Spanish, Gujarati, Hindi, and Punjabi. Robbinsville, in neighboring Mercer County, hosts the world's largest Hindu temple outside Asia. Carteret's Punjabi Sikh community, variously estimated at upwards of 3,000, is the largest concentration of Sikhs in the state. Bergen County is home to America's largest Malayali community.

New Jersey also has the third-largest Korean population, with Bergen County home to the highest Korean concentration per capita of any U.S. county (6.9% in 2011). It is a growing hub and home to all of the nation's top ten municipalities by percentage of Korean population, led by Palisades Park (벼랑 공원), the municipality with the highest density of ethnic Koreans in the Western Hemisphere. Displaying ubiquitous Hangul (한글) signage and known as the Korean village, Palisades Park uniquely comprises a Korean majority (52% in 2010) of its population, with both the highest Korean-American density and percentage of any municipality in the United States.

==== Birth data ====
Live births by single race/ethnicity of mother
Race	2014	2015	2016	2017	2018	2019	2020	2021	2022	2023	2024
White	48,196 (46.6%)	47,425 (46.0%)	46,076 (44.9%)	45,825 (45.3%)	45,500 (44.9%)	45,368 (45.6%)	44,709 (45.6%)	47,318 (46.6%)	47,356 (46.0%)	46,205 (45.7%)	45,574 (45.0%)
Black	20,102 (19.4%)	18,363 (17.8%)	13,870 (13.5%)	13,684 (13.5%)	13,886 (13.7%)	13,394 (13.4%)	12,951 (13.2%)	12,822 (12.6%)	12,911 (12.5%)	12,030 (11.9%)	11,436 (11.3%)
Asian	11,977 (11.6%)	12,192 (11.8%)	12,053 (11.7%)	11,691 (11.5%)	11,452 (11.3%)	11,112 (11.2%)	10,451 (10.7%)	10,281 (10.1%)	10,561 (10.3%)	9,983 (9.9%)	10,416 (10.3%)
Hispanic (any race)	27,267 (26.4%)	27,919 (27.1%)	28,083 (27.3%)	27,354 (27.0%)	27,597 (27.3%)	27,443 (27.6%)	27,205 (27.8%)	28,143 (27.7%)	29,931 (29.1%)	30,238 (29.9%)	31,099 (30.7%)
Total	103,305 (100%)	103,127 (100%)	102,647 (100%)	101,250 (100%)	101,223 (100%)	99,585 (100%)	97,954 (100%)	101,497 (100%)	102,893 (100%)	101,001 (100%)	101,372 (100%)

=== Languages ===
Most common non-English languages spoken in New Jersey
Language	Percentage of population (as of 2010)
Spanish	14.59%
Chinese (including Cantonese and Mandarin)	1.23%
Italian	1.06%
Portuguese	1.06%
Filipino	0.96%
Korean	0.89%
Gujarati	0.83%
Polish	0.79%
Hindi	0.71%
Arabic	0.62%
Russian	0.56%

As of 2010, 71.31% (5,830,812) of New Jersey residents age 5 and older spoke English at home as a primary language, while 14.59% (1,193,261) spoke Spanish, 1.23% (100,217) Chinese (which includes Cantonese and Mandarin), 1.06% (86,849) Italian, 1.06% (86,486) Portuguese, 0.96% (78,627) Tagalog, and Korean was spoken as a main language by 0.89% (73,057) of the population over the age of five. In total, 28.69% (2,345,644) of New Jersey's population age 5 and older spoke a mother language other than English.

A diverse collection of languages has since evolved amongst the state's population, given that New Jersey has become cosmopolitan and is home to ethnic enclaves of non-English-speaking communities:

- Albanian – Paterson, Garfield
- Arabic – Bayonne, Paterson, Jersey City
- Armenian – Bergen County
- Bengali – Paterson
- Gujarati and Hindi – Jersey City, all of Middlesex County, Cherry Hill, Parsippany, Princeton
- Indonesian – Gloucester City, Middlesex, Somerset, and Union counties
- Japanese – Edgewater and Fort Lee boroughs in Bergen County
- Korean – Bergen County (numerous municipalities); Edison; and Cherry Hill
- Macedonian – Bergen County
- Malayalam – Bergen County
- Polish – Bergen County (Garfield, Wallington); Mercer County (Top Road, Lawrence Township, Hopewell); Linden
- Portuguese – Ironbound section of Newark; Elizabeth
- Russian – Fair Lawn borough of Bergen County, Princeton area and Mercer County
- Tamil and Telugu – Edison, Monroe Township (Edison-South), and all of Middlesex County; Fair Lawn, Parsippany
- Turkish – Little Istanbul section of Paterson, Mount Ephraim, Delran, Cherry Hill
- Urdu – Mount Ephraim has a significant number of residents of Pakistani origin.
- Vietnamese – Atlantic City, Camden/Cherry Hill, Edison Township, Jersey City, Woodlynne
- Yiddish – Lakewood Township, Ocean County, Jackson
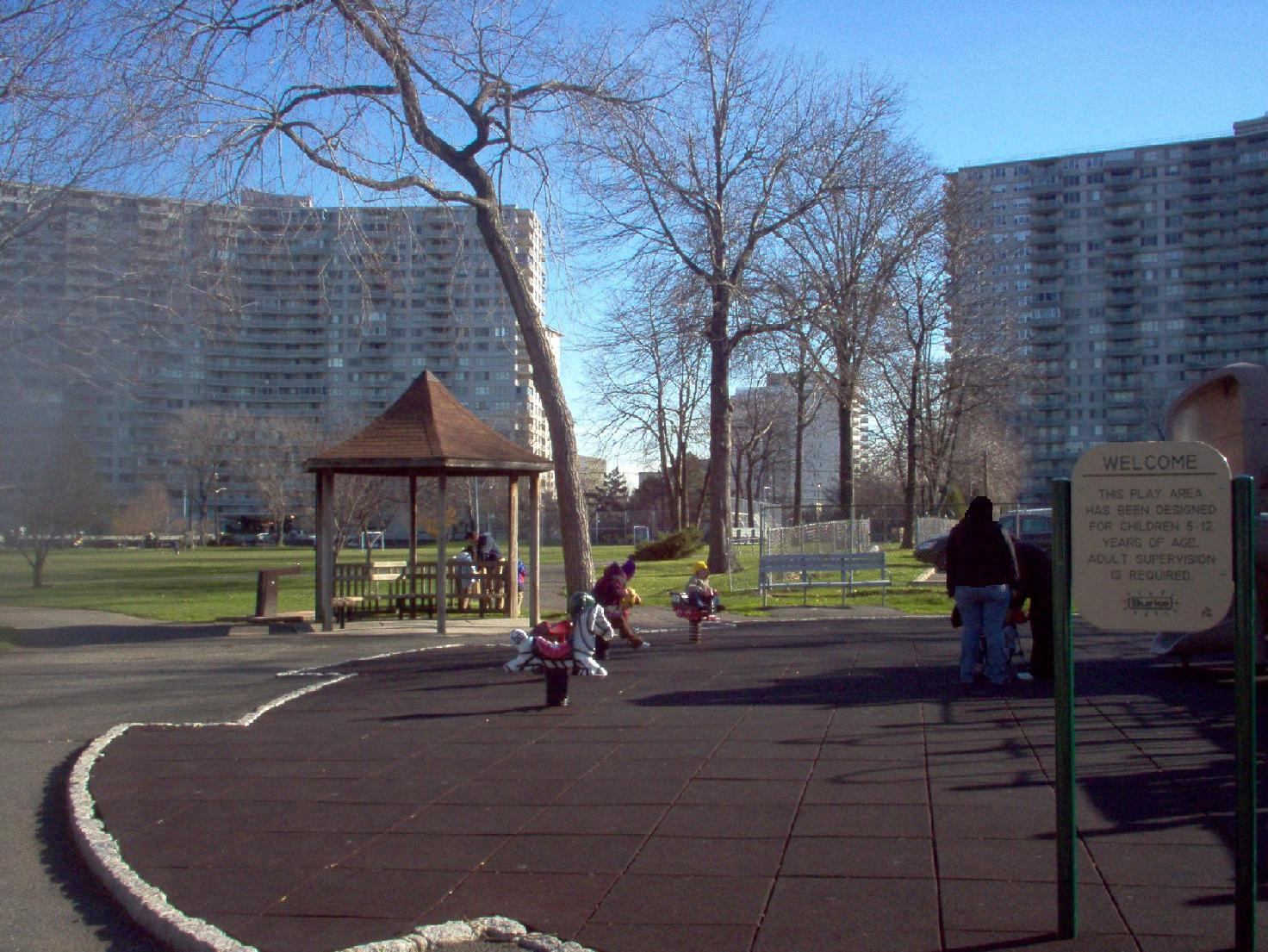
High-rise residential complexes in the borough of Fort Lee

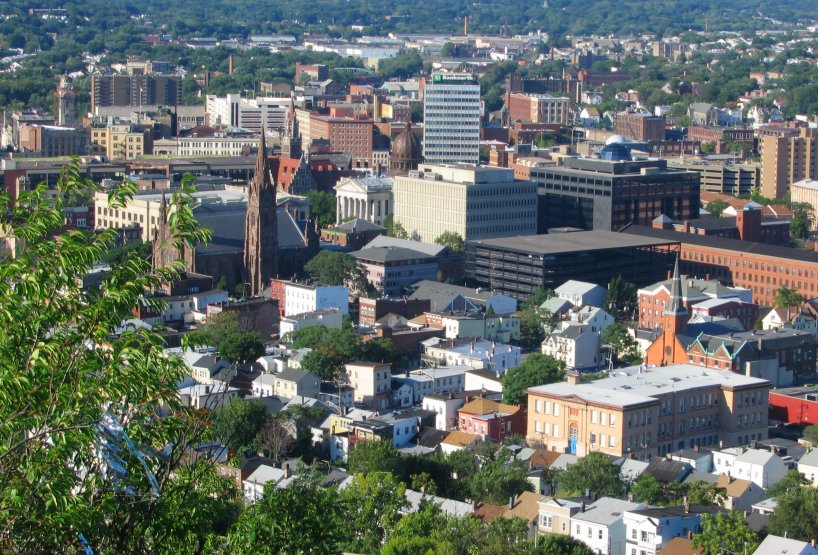
Paterson, sometimes known as Silk City, has become a prime destination for an internationally diverse pool of immigrants, with at least 52 distinct ethnic groups.

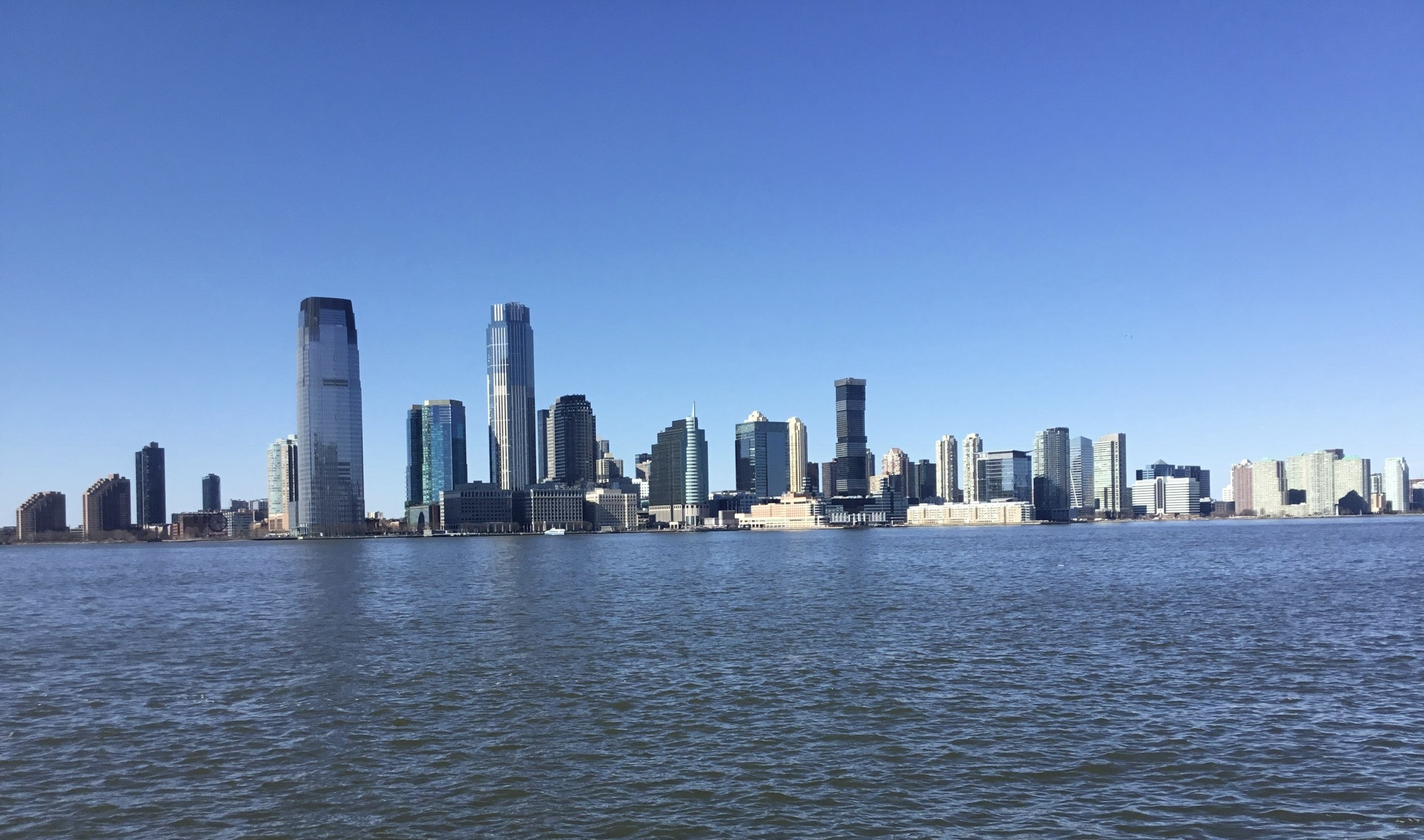
Skyscrapers in Jersey City, one of the most ethnically diverse cities in the world

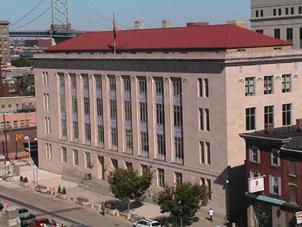
Federal Courthouse in Camden, which is connected to Philadelphia via the Benjamin Franklin Bridge in the background

=== Sexual orientation and gender identity ===
New Jersey is widely regarded as an LGBTQ+ friendly state and is now home to more gay villages per square mile than any other U.S. state. Same-sex marriage in New Jersey has been legally recognized since October 21, 2013, the effective date of a trial court ruling invalidating New Jersey's restriction of marriage to persons of different sexes at the time. In September 2013, Mary C. Jacobson, Assignment Judge of the Mercer Vicinage of the Superior Court, ruled that as a result of the U.S. Supreme Court's June 2013 decision in United States v. Windsor, the Constitution of New Jersey requires the state to recognize same-sex marriages.

Numerous gayborhoods have emerged in New Jersey, most prominently in Jersey City, Asbury Park, Maplewood, Montclair, and Lambertville. Trenton, the state capital of New Jersey, elected Reed Gusciora, its first openly gay mayor, in 2018, and Jennifer Williams, New Jersey's first openly transgender city councilmember, in 2022. In June 2018, Maplewood, Essex County unveiled permanent rainbow-colored crosswalks to celebrate LGBTQ pride. Rahway, Union County, also unveiled its own rainbow-colored crosswalks in June 2019. In January 2019, New Jersey Governor Phil Murphy signed legislation mandating LGBTQ+ inclusive educational curriculum in schools. In February 2019, New Jersey began allowing a neutral or non-binary gender choice on birth certificates.

=== Religion ===
Religion in New Jersey (2014)
Religion	Percent
Catholic	34%
Protestant	31%
Unaffiliated	18%
Jewish	6%
Hindu	3%
Muslim	3%
Mormon	1%
Eastern Orthodox	1%
Jehovah's Witness	1%
Buddhist or other faith	2%
Don't know	1%

By number of adherents, the largest religious traditions in New Jersey, according to the 2010 Association of Religion Data Archives, were the Roman Catholic Church with 3,235,290; Islam with 160,666; and the United Methodist Church with 138,052. The world's largest Hindu temple outside Asia is in Robbinsville, Mercer County. In September 2021, the State of New Jersey aligned with the World Hindu Council to declare October Hindu Heritage Month. In January 2018, Gurbir Grewal became the first Sikh American to serve as state attorney general in the United States. In January 2019, Sadaf Jaffer of Montgomery became the first female Muslim American mayor, first female South Asian mayor, and first female Pakistani-American mayor in the U.S. Large numbers of Orthodox Jews are now migrating to New Jersey from New York, due to the latter's higher cost of living. The world's largest gathering of rabbis outside of Israel occurred in Edison on December 1, 2024.

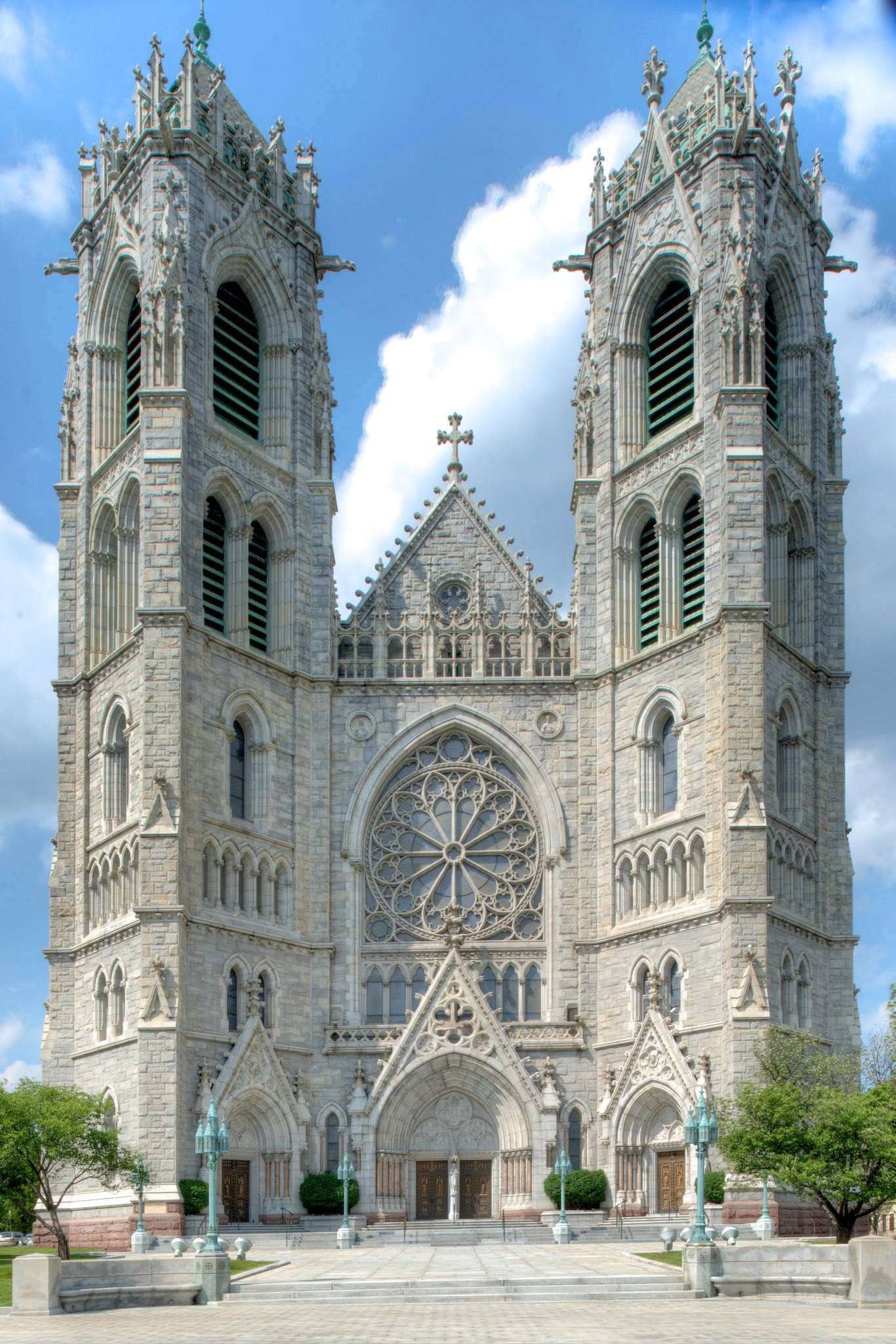
Cathedral Basilica of the Sacred Heart in Newark, the fifth-largest cathedral in North America, is the seat of the city's Roman Catholic archdiocese.

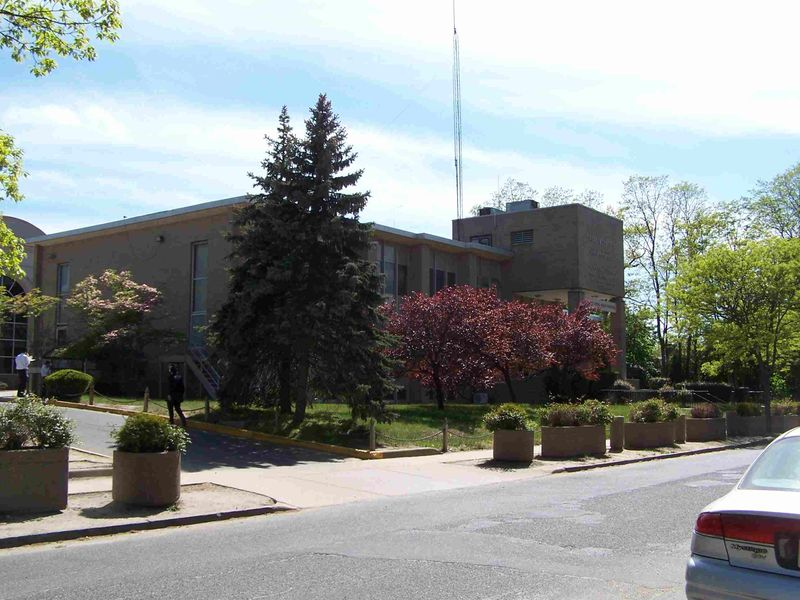
Beth Medrash Govoha (Hebrew: בית מדרש גבוה), in Lakewood, Ocean County, the world's largest Jewish yeshiva outside Israel. New Jersey is home to the second-highest Jewish American population per capita, after New York, and the fastest-growing Orthodox Jewish population.

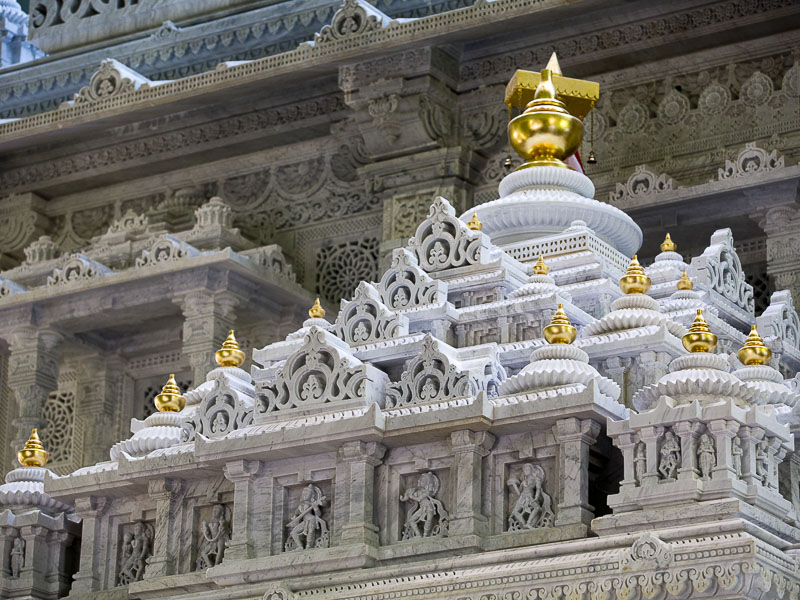
Akshardam New Jersey in Robbinsville, Mercer County, the world's second-largest Hindu temple and the largest in the Western Hemisphere. New Jersey is home to the highest Hindu population per capita in the U.S.

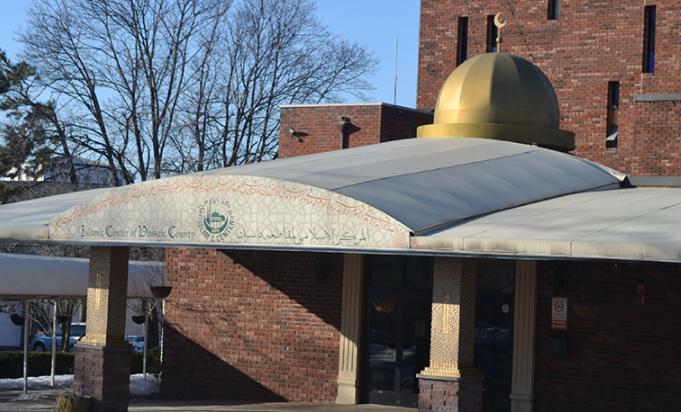
Islamic Center of Passaic County, Paterson, Passaic County, was founded in 1990. New Jersey is home to one of the highest Muslim population concentrations in the Western Hemisphere (3.5%), and Paterson, which houses the Islamic Center of Passaic County, is the epicenter of New Jersey's Muslim community, leading South Paterson to be nicknamed Little Istanbul and Little Ramallah.

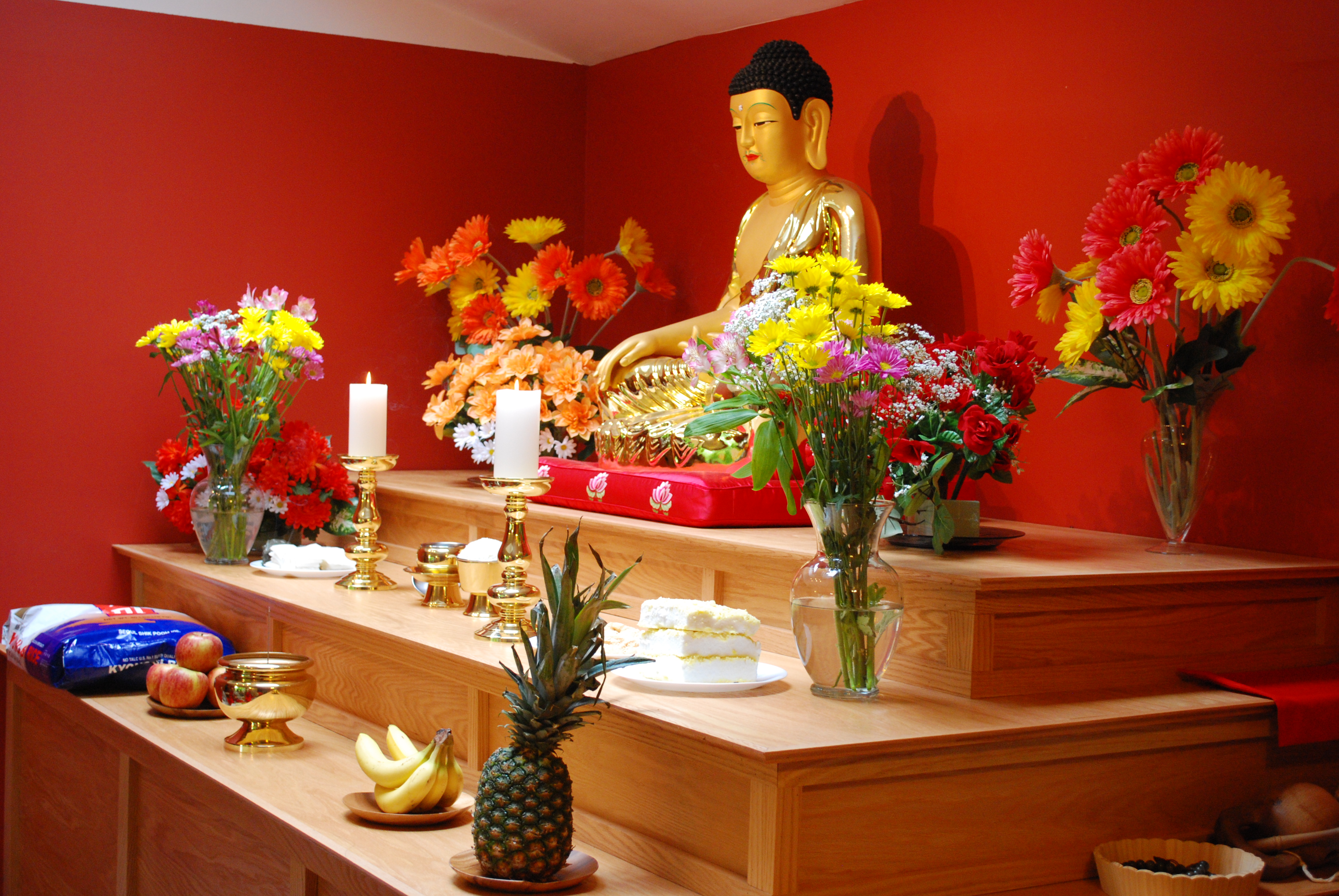
So Shim Sa Zen Center in Middlesex County, serving New Jersey's Buddhist community

== Education ==
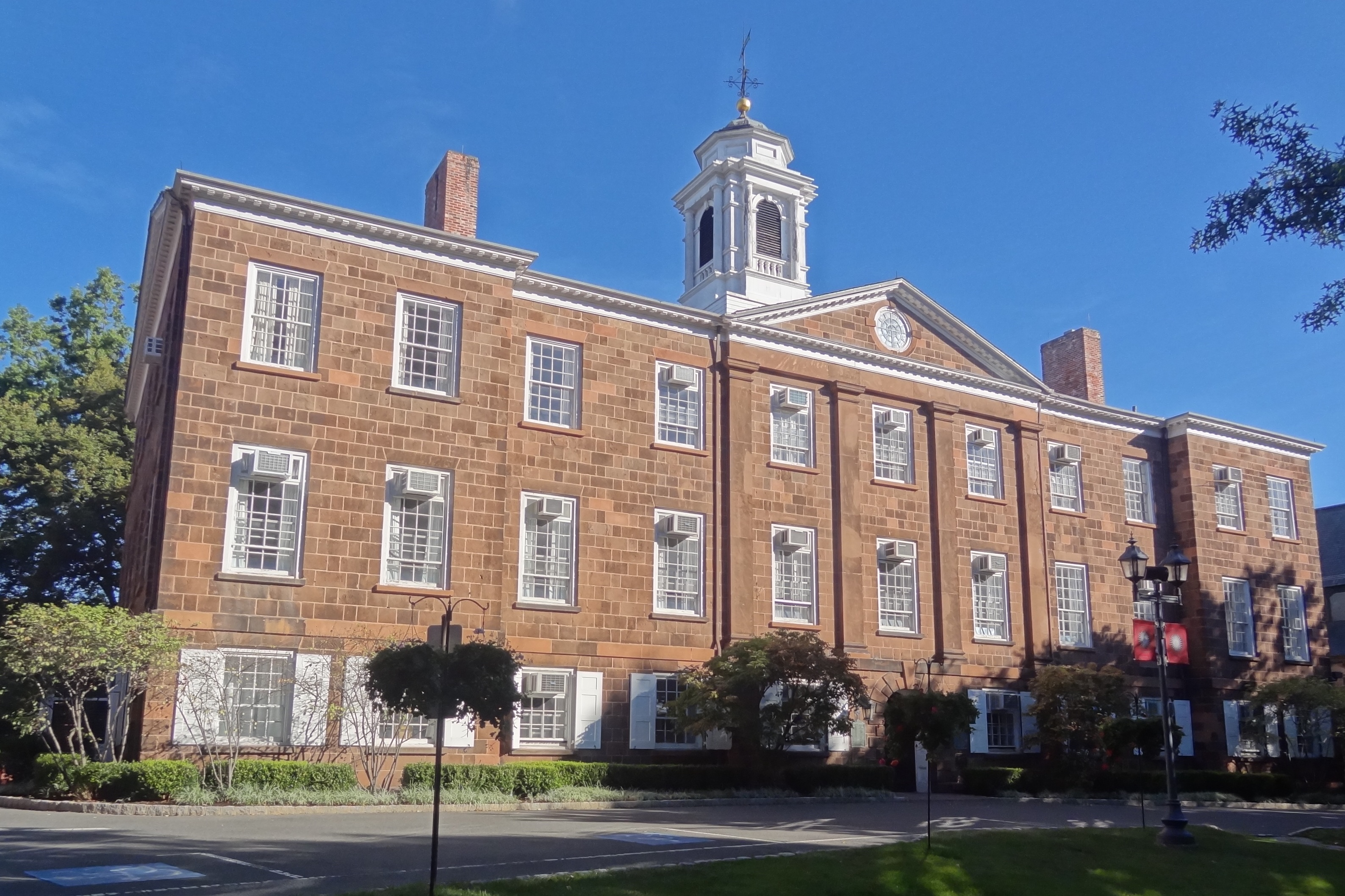
Old Queens at Rutgers University, the largest state university system in New Jersey

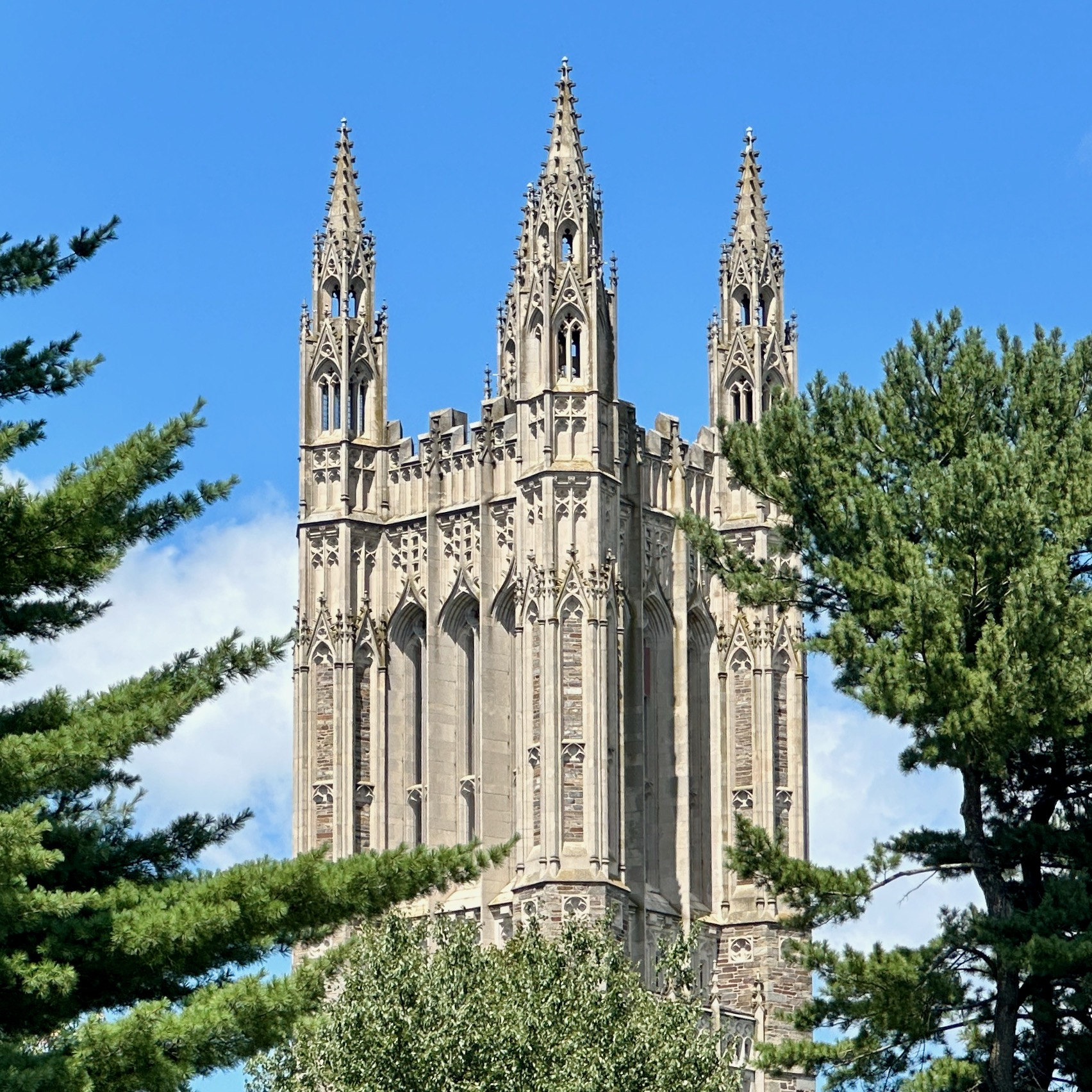
Cleveland Tower at Princeton University, an Ivy League university and one of the world's most prominent research institutions, served briefly as the U.S. Capitol in the 18th century.

As of the 2020–2021 school year, there were 686 operating districts in the state. Of these, 599 were traditional public school districts and 87 were charter school districts. The NJDOE reported a total district enrollment of 1,362,400 students, the lowest total enrollment since the early 2000s, though these figures do not consider homeschooled students or those attending out-of-state schools. New Jersey public schools emphasize STEM subjects, and New Jersey is home to more scientists and engineers per square mile than anywhere else in the world.

=== Educational standards ===
New Jersey is known for the high quality of its education. In 2024, New Jersey spent the second-most per public school student among all states, behind New York, amounting to $26,600 spent per pupil. In 2018, over 50% of the expenditure was allocated to student instruction.

New Jersey is home to several prestigious private universities, including Princeton University, one of the world's most prominent research universities, which was ranked first for the tenth consecutive year among all national universities by U.S. News & World Report in 2025 and has ranked first in comparable lists published by Forbes and The Wall Street Journal, and public universities such as Rutgers University, headquartered in New Brunswick, Middlesex County, the state's flagship institution of higher education.

In 2019, 2020, and 2021, Education Week also ranked New Jersey public schools the best of all U.S. states.

In 2016, nine New Jersey-based high schools were ranked among the top 25 in the nation, more than any other state, in "America's Top High Schools 2016", published by Newsweek.

In November 2023, New Jersey Governor Phil Murphy signed into law legislation eliminating testing for prospective teachers in reading, writing, and math, replacing it with an alternative certification process.

== Economy ==
According to the U.S. Bureau of Economic Analysis, in 2025, New Jersey's gross state product was $887.1 billion and the state's per capita personal income was $88,223.

=== Affluence ===
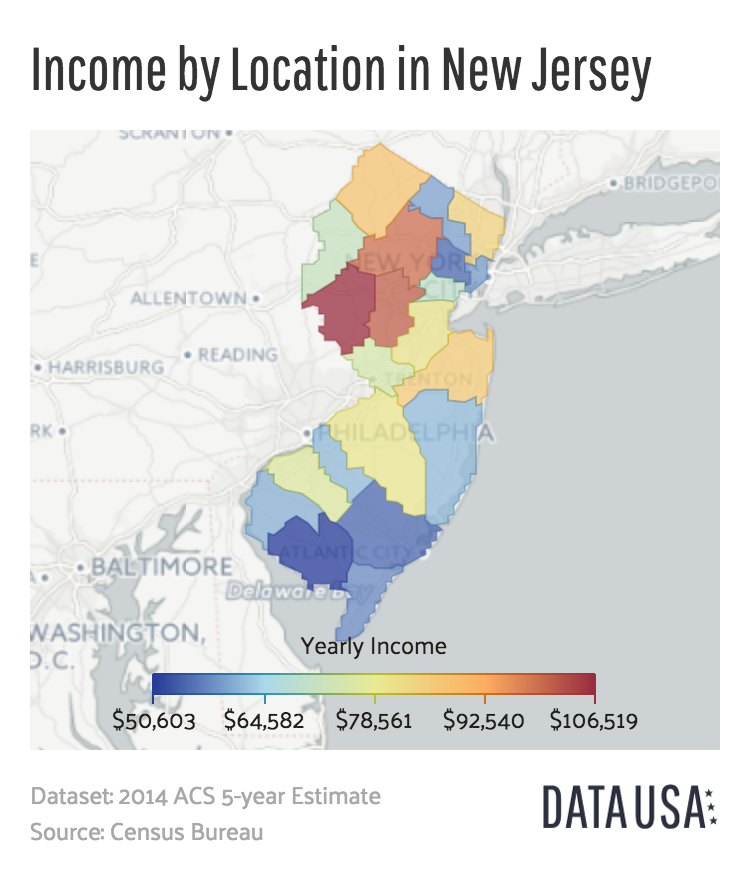
A heat map showing median income distribution in New Jersey by county

New Jersey's per capita gross state product routinely ranks among the highest in the nation. In 2020, New Jersey had more millionaires both per capita and per square mile, representing roughly 9.76% of all New Jersey household, than any state in the nation.

The state is ranked second in the nation by the number of places with per capita incomes exceeding the national average with 76.4%. Three of New Jersey's counties are among the 20 highest income U.S. counties in the nation as of 2023.

As of May 2025, the state's unemployment rate was 4.8%.

=== Fiscal policy ===
New Jersey has seven tax brackets that determine state income tax rates, which range from 1.4% (for income below $20,000) to 10.75% (for income above $1,000,000).

The standard sales tax rate as of January 1, 2018, is 6.625%, applicable to all retail sales unless specifically exempt by law. This rate, which is comparably lower than that of New York City, often attracts numerous shoppers from New York City, often to suburban Paramus, New Jersey, which has five malls, one of which (the Garden State Plaza) has over 2 million square feet (200,000 m^{2}) of retail space. Tax exemptions include most food items for at-home preparation, medications, most clothing, footwear and disposable paper products for use in the home. There are 27 Urban Enterprise Zone statewide, including sections of Paterson, Elizabeth, and Jersey City. In addition to other benefits to encourage employment within the zone, shoppers can take advantage of a reduced 3.3125% sales tax rate (half the rate charged statewide) at eligible merchants.

New Jersey has the highest cumulative tax rate of all 50 states with residents paying a total of $68 billion in state and local taxes annually with a per capita burden of $7,816 at a rate of 12.9% of income. All real property located in the state is subject to property tax unless specifically exempted by statute. New Jersey does not assess an intangible personal property tax or an estate tax, but it does impose an inheritance tax (which is levied only on heirs who are not direct descendants). In 2023, Governor Phil Murphy signed into law a new tax-relief program known as StayNJ that will provide for an annual property-tax cut of 50% for those aged 65 and over with incomes below $500,000; the cut will go into effect in January 2026 and be capped at $6,500, but with this cap rising as indexed to the increase in New Jersey's overall property taxes.

=== Federal taxation disparity ===
New Jersey consistently ranks as having one of the highest proportional levels of disparity of any state in the U.S., based upon what it receives from the federal government relative to what it pays. In 2015, WalletHub ranked New Jersey the state that was least dependent on federal government aid overall and the state with the fourth-lowest return on taxpayer investment from the federal government, at 48 cents per dollar. In 2023, New Jersey sent approximately $183 billion to Washington, D.C. in taxes but only received approximately $113 billion in federal investment resulting in each state resident sending the federal government approximately $7,500 more than they get back. In 2025, WalletHub again ranked New Jersey as the least dependent on federal government aid overall with now the second-lowest return on taxpayer spending from the federal government, at 48 cents per dollar.

New Jersey has one of the highest tax burdens of any state the nation. Factors for this include the large federal tax liability, which is not adjusted for New Jersey's higher cost of living and Medicaid funding formulas.

=== Industries ===
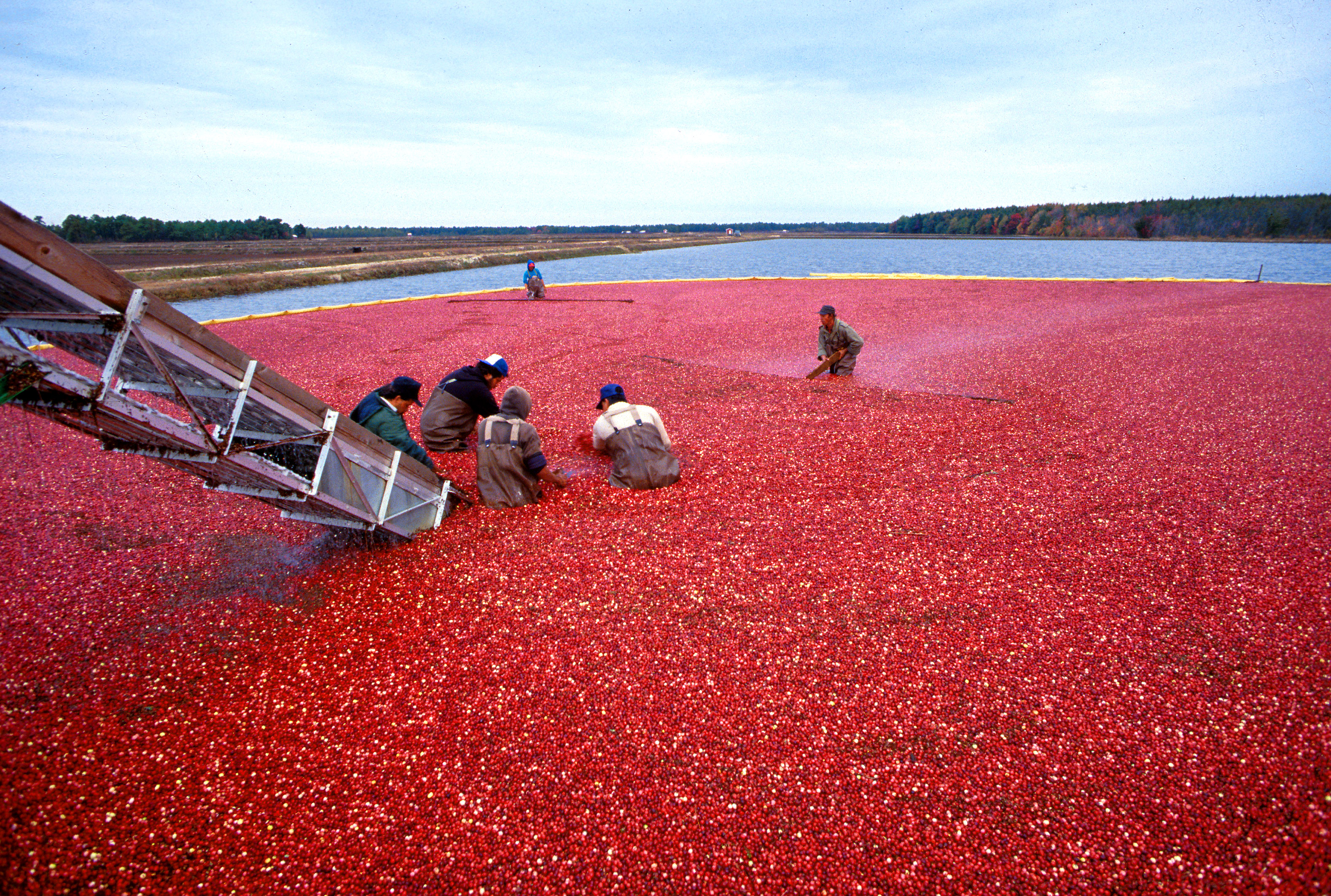
Cranberry harvest

New Jersey's economy is multifaceted, featuring high levels of both productivity and retail consumption; the Garden State's economy comprises the pharmaceutical industry, biotechnology, information technology, the financial industry, tourism, filmmaking, telecommunications, gambling, food processing, electrical equipment manufacturing, printing, and publishing. New Jersey's agricultural outputs are nursery stock, horses, vegetables, fruits and nuts, seafood, and dairy products. New Jersey ranks second among states in blueberry production, third in cranberries and spinach, and fourth in bell peppers, peaches, and head lettuce. The state harvests the fourth-largest number of acres planted with asparagus. South Jersey has become an East Coast epicenter for logistics and warehouse construction. In 2025, 99.7% of businesses in New Jersey were small businesses, employing 48.8% of the state's workforce.

==== Scientific economy ====
New Jersey has a strong scientific economy and is home to major pharmaceutical and telecommunications firms, drawing on the state's large and well-educated labor pool, including one of the highest concentrations of engineers and other scientists in the world. There is also a robust service economy in retail sales, education, and real estate, serving residents who work in New York City or Philadelphia. Thomas Edison invented the first electric light bulb at his home in Menlo Park, Edison in 1879. New Jersey is also a key participant in the renewable wind industry. New Jersey has more scientists and engineers per square mile than anywhere in the world, and is a global leader in pharmaceuticals, biotechnology, life sciences, and technology.

==== Corporate and retail ====
New Jersey hosts numerous business headquarters, including twenty-four Fortune 500 companies. Paramus in Bergen County has become the top retail ZIP code (07652) in the United States, with the municipality generating over US$6 billion in annual retail sales. Several New Jersey counties, including Somerset (7), Morris (10), Hunterdon (13), Bergen (21), and Monmouth (42), have been ranked among the highest-income counties in the United States.

==== Shipping, manufacturing, and logistics ====
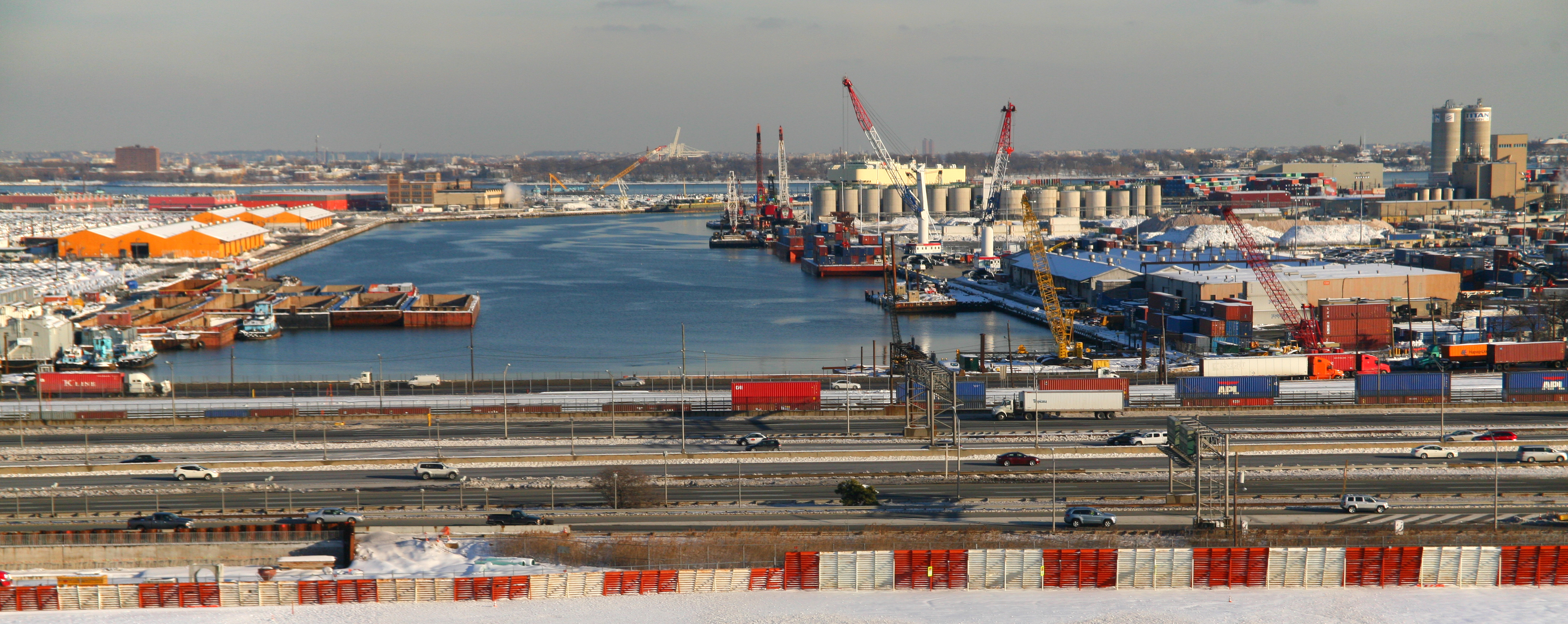
The Port Newark-Elizabeth Marine Terminal was the world's first container seaport and remains one of the world's largest and busiest.

Shipping is a key industry in New Jersey because of the state's strategic geographic location, the Port of New York and New Jersey being the busiest seaport on the U.S. East Coast. The Port Newark-Elizabeth Marine Terminal was the world's first container port and today is one of the world's largest and busiest. New Jersey's location at the center of the Eastern North American population belt has made the state a prime hub for the logistics, warehousing, and supply chain management industries. The manufacturing economy in New Jersey had declined for several decades in the post-Industrial Revolution era but has since resumed growth.

==== Tourism ====
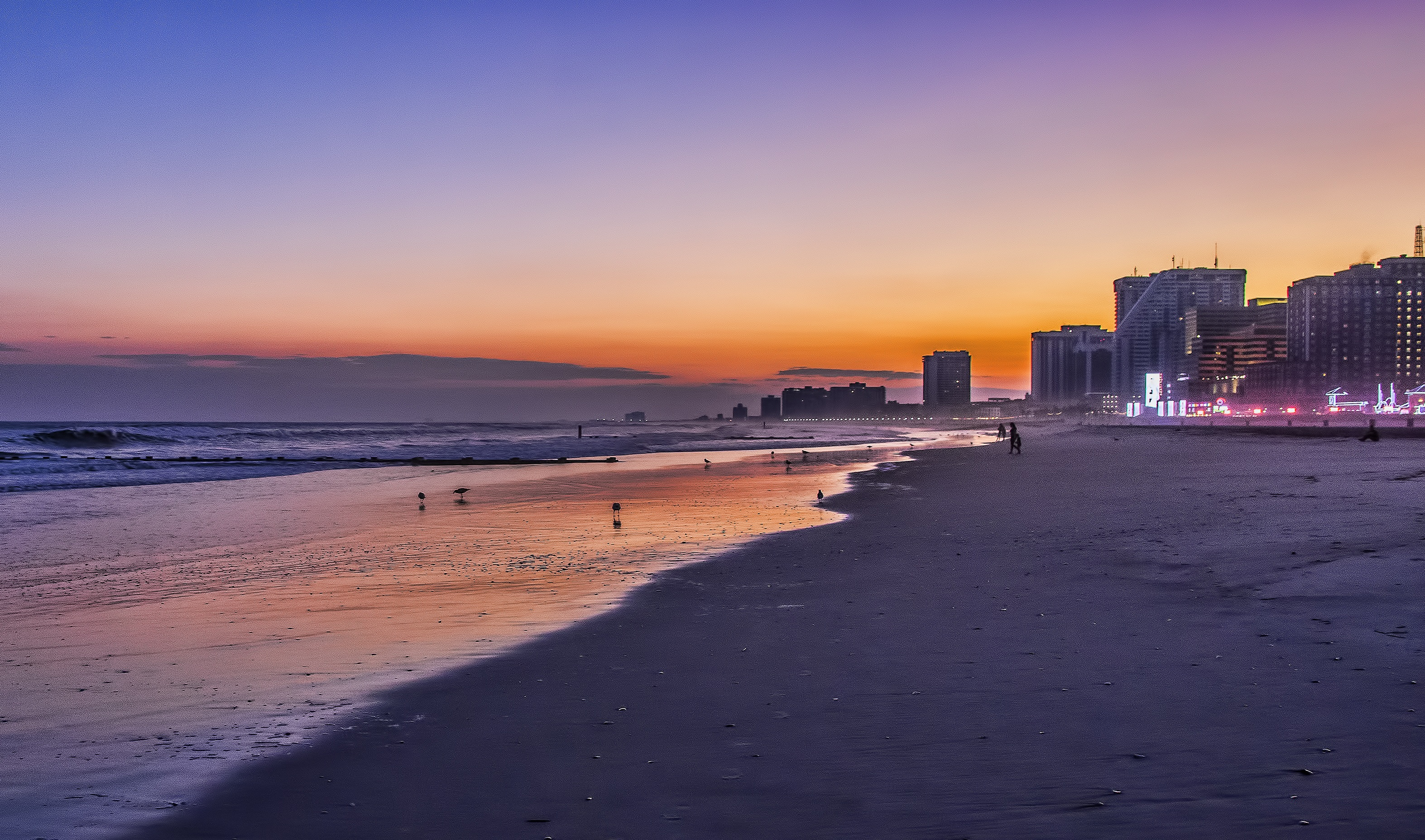
Sunset on the beach at Atlantic City, an oceanfront resort and the nexus of New Jersey's gambling industry

New Jersey's location at the center of the Northeast megalopolis and its extensive transportation system have put over one-third of all United States residents and many Canadian residents within overnight distance by land. This accessibility to consumer revenue has enabled seaside resorts such as Atlantic City and the remainder of the Jersey Shore, as well as the state's other natural and cultural attractions, to contribute significantly to the record 111 million tourist visits to New Jersey in 2018, providing US$44.7 billion in tourism revenue, directly supporting 333,860 jobs, sustaining more than 531,000 jobs overall including peripheral impacts, and generating US$5 billion in state and local tax revenue.

==== Gambling ====
In 1976, a referendum by Jersey voters approved casino gambling in Atlantic City, where the first legalized casino opened in 1978. At that time, Las Vegas was the only other casino resort in the country. Today, several casinos lie along the Atlantic City Boardwalk, the oldest and longest boardwalk in the world, at 5 1/2 miles (8.9 km) in length. Atlantic City experienced a dramatic contraction in its stature as a gambling destination after 2010, including the closure of multiple casinos since 2014, spurred by competition from the advent of legalized gambling in other northeastern U.S. states.

On February 26, 2013, Governor Chris Christie signed online gambling into law. Sports betting has become a growing source of gambling revenue in New Jersey, with sportsbooks bringing in almost $12 billion in bets, making over $1 billion in revenue in 2023. Since being legalized across the nation by the U.S. Supreme Court on May 14, 2018, New Jersey led all states in sports betting handle until New York passed them. In September 2022, the lifetime revenue from online casinos operating in New Jersey for the nine years since the industry's launch had surpassed $5 billion.

==== Media ====
New Jersey's telephone area codes

===== Television and film production =====
New Jersey is a growing center for filmmaking and television production, with media companies, enticed by its proximity to Manhattan, in conjunction with tax incentives, collectively spending billions of dollars to develop large new studio facilities and sound stage complexes. Motion picture technology was developed by Thomas Edison, with much of his early work done at his West Orange laboratory. Edison's Black Maria was the first motion picture studio. America's first motion picture industry started in 1907 in Fort Lee and the first studio was constructed there in 1909. DuMont Laboratories in Passaic developed early sets and made the first broadcast to the private home.

A number of television shows and films have been filmed in New Jersey. Since 1978, the state has maintained a Motion Picture and Television Commission to encourage filming in-state. New Jersey has long offered tax credits to television producers. Governor Chris Christie suspended the credits in 2010, but the New Jersey State Legislature in 2011 approved the restoration and expansion of the tax credit program. Under bills passed by both the state Senate and Assembly, the program offers 20 percent tax credits (22% in urban enterprise zones) to television and film productions that shoot in the state and meet set standards for hiring and local spending. When Governor Phil Murphy took office, he instated the New Jersey Film & Digital Media Tax Credit Program in 2018 and expanded it in 2020. The benefits include a 30% tax credit on film projects and a 40% subsidy for studio developments.

===== Newspapers =====
- Asbury Park Press
- Burlington County Times
- Courier News
- Courier-Post
- Daily Record (Morristown)
- The Express-Times
- Gloucester County Times
- Herald News
- Home News Tribune
- Hunterdon County Democrat
- Jersey Journal
- New Jersey Herald
- The News of Cumberland County
- The Press of Atlantic City
- The Record
- South Jersey Times
- The Star-Ledger
- The Times (Trenton)
- Today's Sunbeam
- Trentonian (Mercer)

===== Television stations =====
New Jersey has several PBS member stations: WNET (13) in Newark, WNJN (50) in Montclair, WNJB (58) in New Brunswick, WNJS (23) in Camden and WNJT (52) in Trenton.

There are no standard commercial network affiliates in the state. WMGM-TV (Wildwood) lost its affiliation with NBC in 2014. Viewers in northern New Jersey receive New York City market stations over cable or over the air; southern New Jersey viewers receive Philadelphia market stations over cable or over the air.

WMGM now affiliates with the True Crime Network. WJLP (Middletown) affiliates with the retro network MeTV. There are Telemundo affiliates in Fort Lee, Linden and Mount Laurel, and Univision affiliates in Paterson and Vineland.

==== Finance as Wall Street West ====
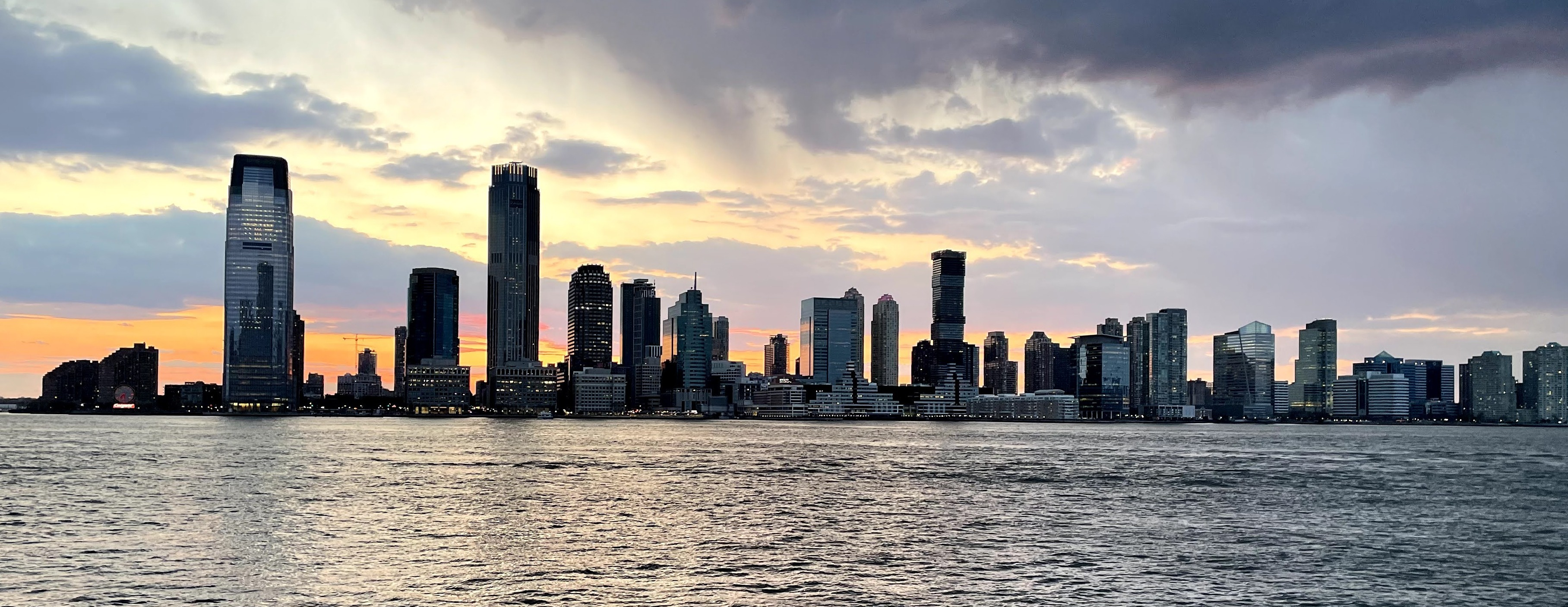
The developing waterfront skyline of Downtown Jersey City, dubbed Wall Street West

Jersey City's Hudson River waterfront, from Exchange Place to Newport, is known as Wall Street West and has over 13 million square feet of Class A office space. One third of the private sector jobs in the city are in the financial services sector: more than 60% are in the securities industry, 20% are in banking and 8% in insurance. Jersey City is home to the headquarters of Verisk Analytics and Lord Abbett, a privately held money management firm. Companies such as Computershare, ADP, IPC Systems, and Fidelity Investments also conduct operations in the city. In 2014, Forbes magazine moved its headquarters to the district, having been awarded a $27 million tax grant in exchange for bringing 350 jobs to the city over a ten-year period. By the early 2020s, the construction of residential skyscrapers Downtown made median rental rates in Jersey City amongst the highest of any city in the United States.

==== Natural resources and energy ====
Limited mining activity of zinc, iron, and manganese still takes place in the area in and around the Franklin Furnace in Sussex County.

Although New Jersey is home to many energy-intensive industries, its energy consumption is only 2.7% of the U.S. total, and its carbon dioxide emissions are 0.8% of the U.S. total. New Jersey's electricity comes primarily from natural gas and nuclear power. New Jersey is seventh in the nation in solar power installations, enabled by one of the country's most favorable net metering policies and renewable portfolio standard. The state has more than 140,000 solar installations.

== Environment ==
Due to past industrial activity, New Jersey has more Superfund toxic waste sites than any other state in the union despite its small geographic size. By 2024, only 35 of New Jersey's Superfund sites (out of about 150 that have been on the EPA's list since the Superfund law was passed in 1980) have been cleaned up.

In late 2023, a concern became public about PFAs (so-called "forever chemicals") existing in the state's water supplies.

== Transportation ==
New Jersey's population density and location at the geographic center of the Northeast Megalopolis have rendered it a vital transportation for hub for both passengers and industry.

=== Roadways ===
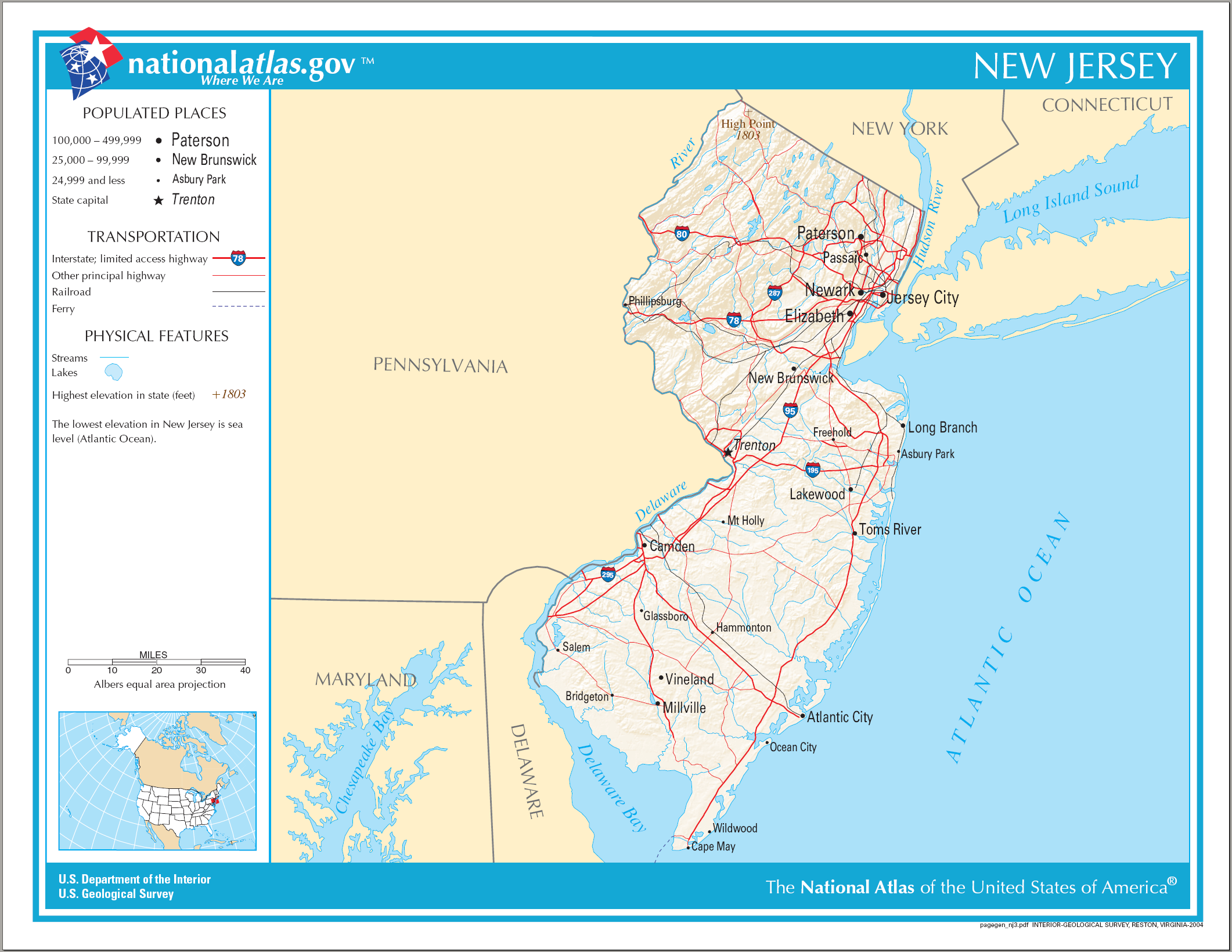
Map of New Jersey's major transportation networks and cities

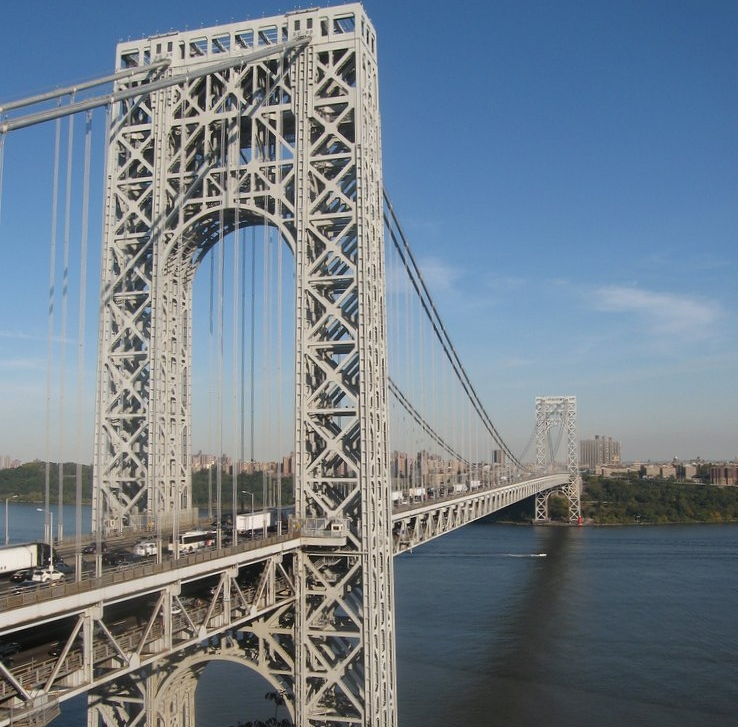
The George Washington Bridge, connecting Fort Lee (foreground) in Bergen County across the Hudson River to New York City (background), is the world's busiest motor vehicle bridge.

The New Jersey Turnpike is one of the most prominent and heavily trafficked roadways in the United States. This toll road, which overlaps with Interstate 95 for much of its length, carries traffic between Delaware and New York, and up and down the East Coast in general. Commonly referred to as simply "the Turnpike", it is known for its numerous rest areas named after prominent New Jerseyans.

The Garden State Parkway, or simply "the Parkway", carries relatively more in-state traffic than interstate traffic and runs from New Jersey's northern border to its southernmost tip at Cape May. It is the main route that connects the New York metropolitan area to the Jersey Shore. With a total of fifteen travel and six shoulder lanes, the Driscoll Bridge on the Parkway, spanning the Raritan River in Middlesex County, is the widest motor vehicle bridge in the world by number of lanes as well as one of the busiest.

New Jersey is connected to New York City via various key bridges and tunnels. The double-decked George Washington Bridge carries the heaviest load of motor vehicle traffic of any bridge in the world, at 102 million vehicles per year, across fourteen lanes. It connects Fort Lee, New Jersey to the Washington Heights neighborhood of Upper Manhattan, and carries Interstate 95 and U.S. Route 1/9 across the Hudson River. The Lincoln Tunnel connects to Midtown Manhattan carrying New Jersey Route 495, and the Holland Tunnel connects to Lower Manhattan carrying Interstate 78. New Jersey is also connected to Staten Island by three bridges—from north to south, the Bayonne Bridge, the Goethals Bridge, and the Outerbridge Crossing.

New Jersey has interstate compacts with all three of its neighboring states. The Port Authority of New York and New Jersey, the Delaware River Port Authority (with Pennsylvania), the Delaware River Joint Toll Bridge Commission (with Pennsylvania), and the Delaware River and Bay Authority (with Delaware) operate most of the major transportation routes in and out of the state. Bridge tolls are collected only from traffic exiting the state, with the exception of the private Dingman's Ferry Bridge over the Delaware River, which charges a toll in both directions.

It is unlawful for a customer to serve themselves gasoline in New Jersey. It became the last remaining U.S. state where all gas stations are required to sell full-service gasoline to customers at all times in 2016, after Oregon's introduction of restricted self-service gasoline availability took effect.

=== Airports ===
Newark Liberty International Airport (EWR) is one of the busiest airports in the United States. Operated by the Port Authority of New York and New Jersey, it is one of the three main airports serving the New York metropolitan area, along with John F. Kennedy International Airport and LaGuardia Airport, which are both in Queens, New York. United Airlines is the airport's largest tenant, operating an entire terminal (Terminal C) there, which it uses as one of its primary hubs. FedEx Express operates a large cargo terminal at EWR as well. The adjacent Newark Airport railroad station provides access to Amtrak and NJ Transit trains along the Northeast Corridor Line.

Two smaller commercial airports, Atlantic City International Airport and rapidly growing Trenton-Mercer Airport, also operate in other parts of the state. Teterboro Airport in Bergen County and Millville Municipal Airport in Cumberland County are general aviation airports popular with private and corporate aircraft due to their proximity to New York City and the Jersey Shore, respectively.

=== Rail and bus ===
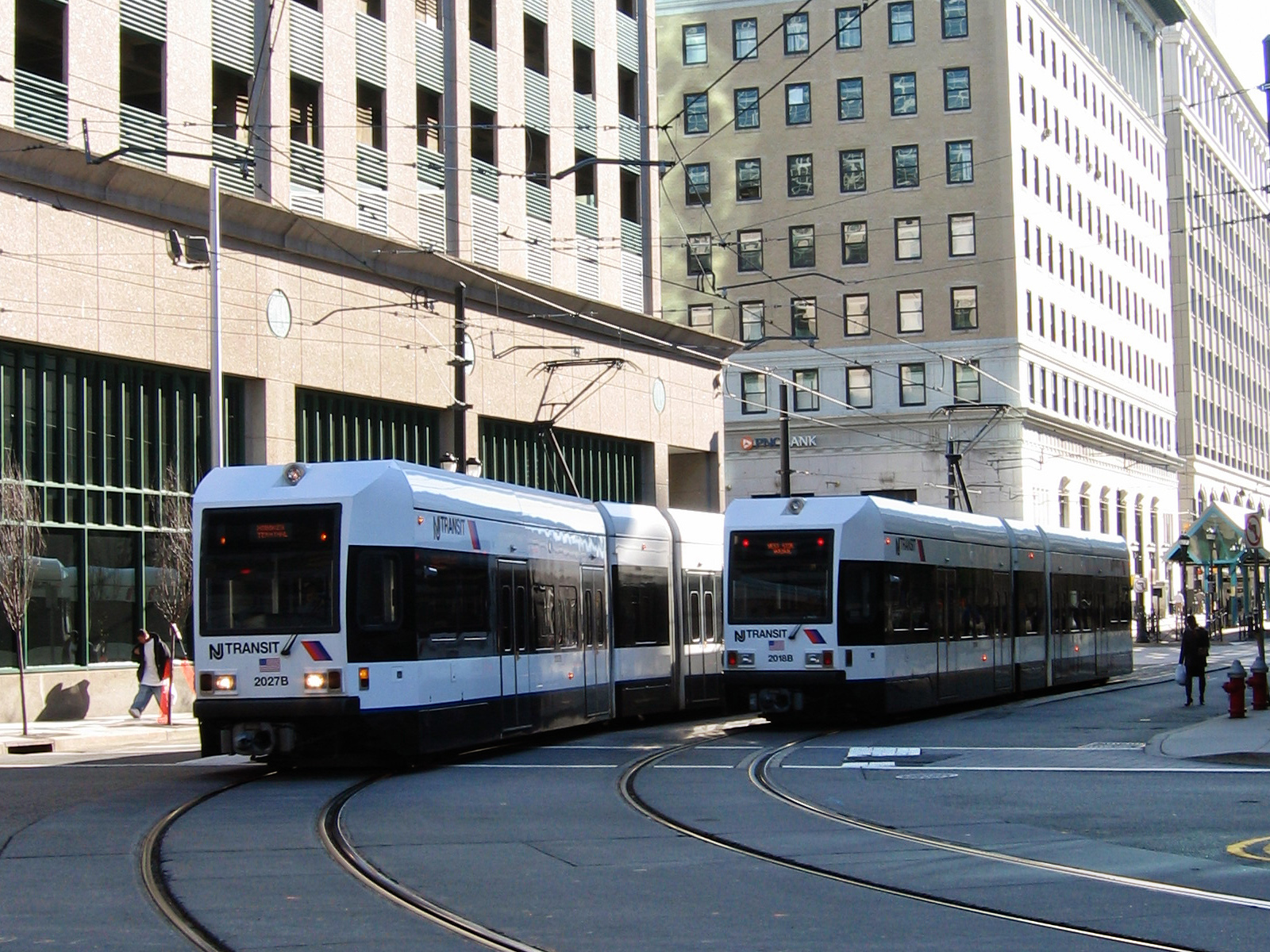
Two Hudson–Bergen Light Rail trains in Jersey City

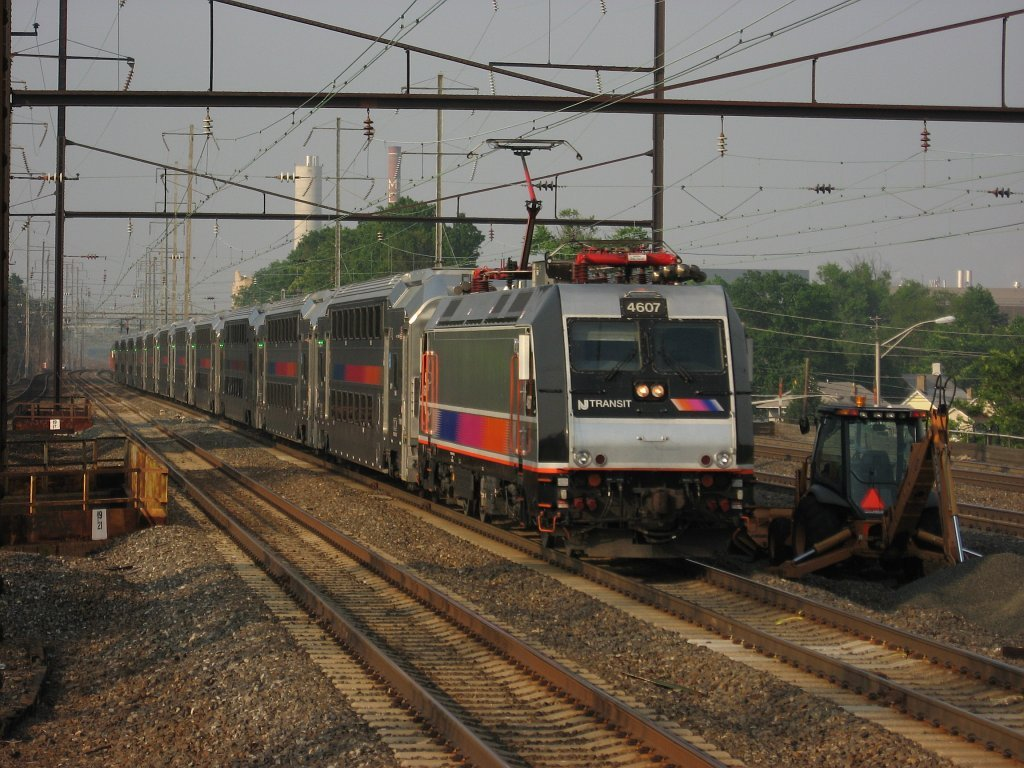
A NJ Transit train on the Northeast Corridor in Rahway

NJ Transit operates extensive rail and bus service throughout the state. A state-run corporation, it began with the consolidation of several private bus companies in North Jersey in 1979. In the early 1980s, it acquired Conrail's commuter train operations that connected suburban towns to New York City. NJ Transit has 12 rail lines that run through different parts of the state and 165 stations statewide. Most of the lines end at either New York Penn Station in Midtown Manhattan or Hoboken Terminal in Hoboken, although some lines provide service to both terminal stations. The Atlantic City Line provides service between Atlantic City and Philadelphia.

NJ Transit also operates three light rail systems in the state. The Hudson-Bergen Light Rail connects Bayonne to North Bergen, through Hoboken and Jersey City. The Newark Light Rail is partially underground, and connects downtown Newark with other parts of the city and its suburbs, Belleville and Bloomfield. The River Line connects Trenton and Camden.

The PATH is a rapid transit system consisting of four lines operated by the Port Authority of New York and New Jersey. It links Hoboken, Jersey City, Harrison, and Newark with New York City. The PATCO Speedline is a rapid transit system that links Camden County to Philadelphia. Both the PATCO and the PATH are two of only five rapid transit systems in the United States to operate 24 hours a day.

Amtrak operates numerous long-distance passenger trains in New Jersey, both to and from neighboring states and around the country. In addition to the Newark Airport connection, other major Amtrak railway stations include Trenton Transit Center, Metropark, and the historic Newark Penn Station.

The Southeastern Pennsylvania Transportation Authority, or SEPTA, has two commuter rail lines that operate into New Jersey. The Trenton Line terminates at the Trenton Transit Center, and the West Trenton Line terminates at the West Trenton Rail Station in Ewing.

AirTrain Newark is a monorail connecting the Amtrak/NJ Transit station on the Northeast Corridor to the airport's terminals and parking lots.

Some private bus carriers still remain in New Jersey. Most of these carriers operate with state funding to offset losses and state owned buses are provided to these carriers, of which Coach USA companies make up the bulk. Other carriers include private charter and tour bus operators that take gamblers from other parts of New Jersey, New York City, Philadelphia, and Delaware to the casino resorts of Atlantic City.

=== Ferries ===
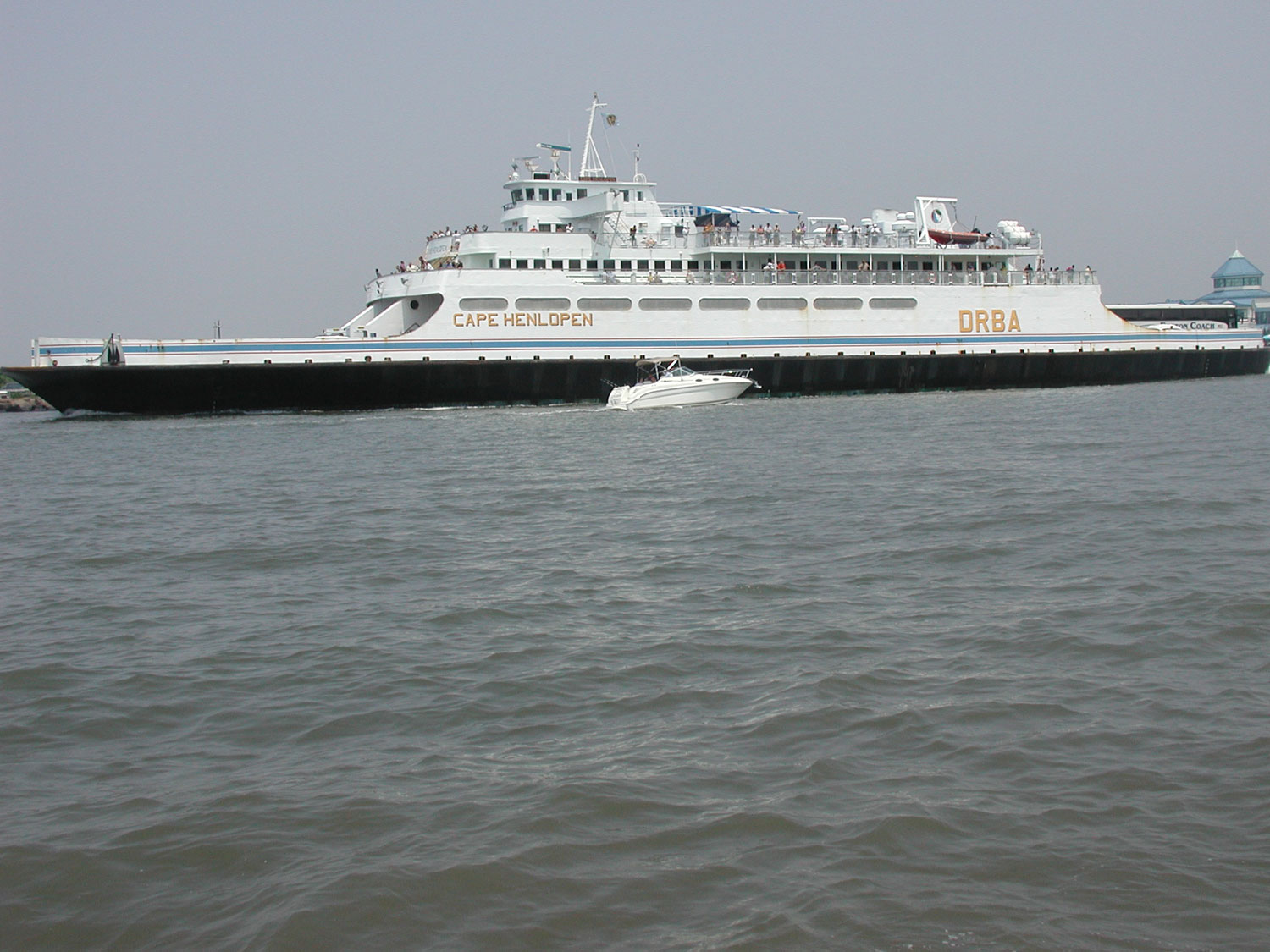
Cape May–Lewes Ferry connects New Jersey and Delaware across Delaware Bay.

New York Waterway has ferry terminals at Belford, Jersey City, Hoboken, Weehawken, and Edgewater, with service to different parts of Manhattan. Liberty Water Taxi in Jersey City has ferries from Paulus Hook and Liberty State Park to Battery Park City in Manhattan. Statue Cruises offers service from Liberty State Park to the Statue of Liberty National Monument, including Ellis Island. SeaStreak offers services from the Raritan Bayshore to Manhattan, Martha's Vineyard, and Nantucket.

The Delaware River and Bay Authority operates the Cape May–Lewes Ferry on Delaware Bay, carrying both passengers and vehicles between New Jersey and Delaware as part of US 9. The agency also operates the Forts Ferry Crossing for passengers across the Delaware River. The Delaware River Port Authority operates the RiverLink Ferry between the Camden waterfront and Penn's Landing in Philadelphia.

== Culture ==
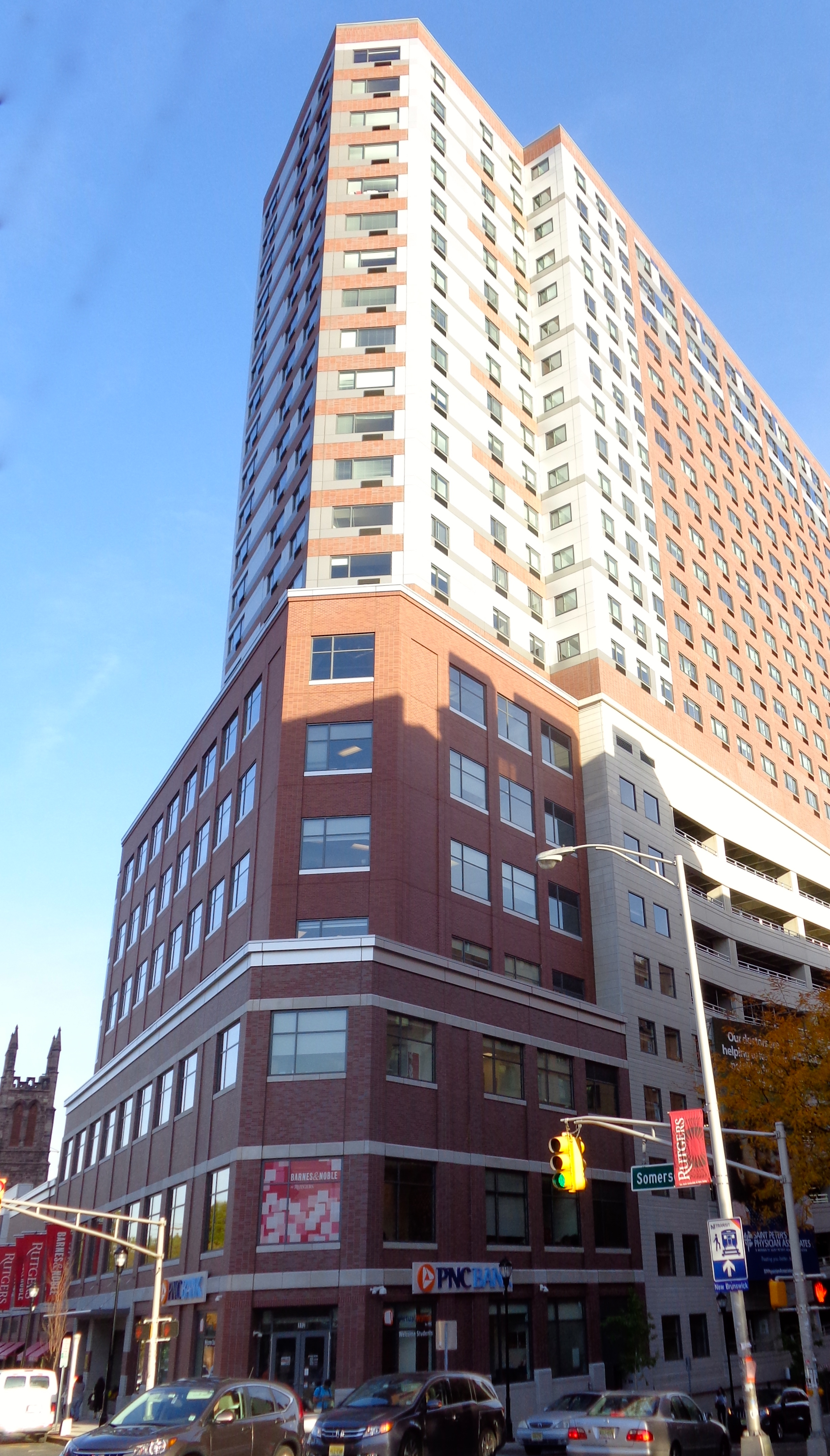
New Brunswick, nicknamed the Hub city and the Healthcare City, is a focus city for academia, healthcare, and culture in New Jersey, and has many high-rise buildings.

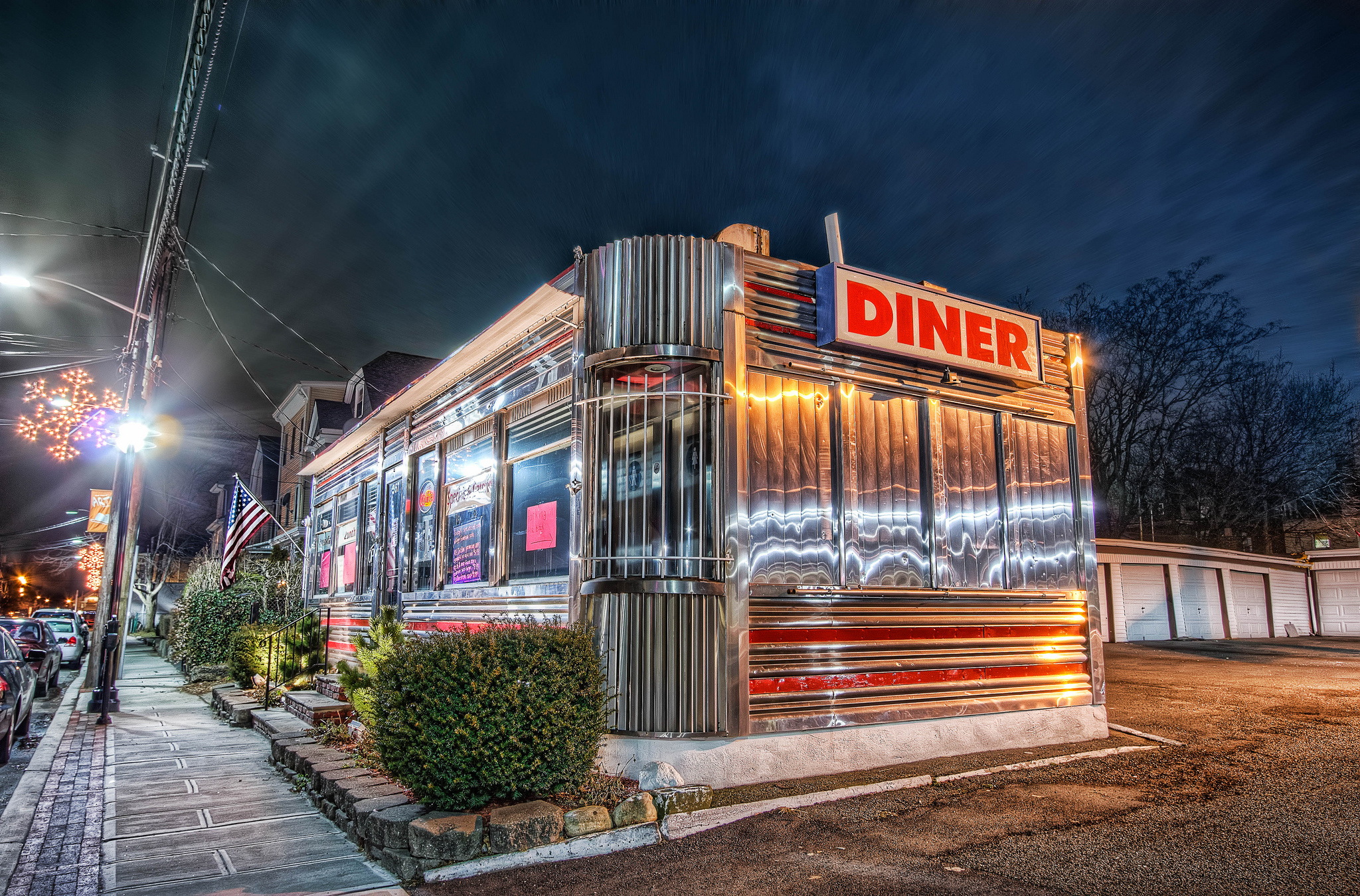
A 1950s-style diner in Orange

=== General ===
New Jersey has continued to play a prominent role as a U.S. cultural nexus. The state has its own cuisines, religious communities, museums, and halls of fame.

New Jersey is the birthplace of many modern inventions, including FM radio, the motion picture camera, the lithium battery, the light bulb, transistors, and the electric train. Other New Jersey creations include: the drive-in movie, the cultivated blueberry, cranberry sauce, the boardwalk, the zipper, the phonograph, saltwater taffy, the dirigible, the seedless watermelon, the first use of a submarine in warfare, and the ice cream cone.

Diners are iconic to New Jersey. The state is home to many diner manufacturers and has over 600 diners, more than any other place in the world.

New Jersey is the only state to have never had a state song; as of 2021, it is one of only two states (the other being Maryland) that are currently without a state song. "I'm From New Jersey" is incorrectly listed on many websites as being the New Jersey state song, but it was not even a contender when the New Jersey Arts Council submitted state song suggestions to the New Jersey Legislature in 1996.

New Jersey is frequently the target of jokes in American culture, especially from New York City-based television shows, such as Saturday Night Live. Academic Michael Aaron Rockland attributes this to New Yorkers' view that New Jersey is the beginning of Middle America. The New Jersey Turnpike, which runs between two major East Coast cities, New York City and Philadelphia, is also cited as a reason, as people who traverse through the state may only see its industrial zones. Reality television shows like Jersey Shore and The Real Housewives of New Jersey have reinforced stereotypical views of New Jersey culture, but Rockland cited The Sopranos and the music of Bruce Springsteen as exporting a more positive image.

The "New" in "New Jersey" is often omitted in casual conversation.

=== Cuisine ===
New Jersey is known for several foods developed within the region, including Taylor Ham (also known as pork roll), sloppy joe sandwiches, tomato pies, salt water taffy, and Texas wieners. Just as New York City's cuisine has an influence on North Jersey, Philadelphia's cuisine influences South Jersey.

New Jersey's third-largest industry is food and agriculture just behind pharmaceuticals and tourism. New Jersey is one of the top 10 producers of blueberries, cranberries, peaches, tomatoes, bell peppers, eggplant, cucumbers, apples, spinach, squash, and asparagus in the United States. Many restaurants in the state offer locally grown ingredients because of this.

Campbell's Soup Company has been headquartered in Camden since 1869. Goya Foods, the largest Hispanic-owned food company in the United States, operates a corporate headquarters in Jersey City. Mars Wrigley Confectionery's US headquarters has been based in Hackettstown and Newark since 2007.

Several states with substantial Italian American populations take credit for the development of submarine sandwiches, including New Jersey.

=== Music ===
New Jersey has long been an important origin for both rock and rap music. Prominent musicians from or with significant connections to New Jersey include:

- Singer Frank Sinatra was born in Hoboken. He sang with a neighborhood vocal group, the Hoboken Four, and appeared in neighborhood theater amateur shows before he became an Academy Award-winning actor.
- Singer Whitney Houston was born in Newark, New Jersey. Houston began singing at New Hope Baptist Church in Newark as a child and became a background vocalist while in high school. She then became the best-selling New Jersey musician ever, having sold over 220 million records worldwide.
- Bruce Springsteen, who has sung of New Jersey life on most of his albums, is from Freehold. Some of his songs that represent New Jersey life are "Born to Run", "Spirit in the Night", "Rosalita (Come Out Tonight)", "Thunder Road", "Atlantic City", and "Jungleland".
- Irvington's Queen Latifah was one of the first female rappers to succeed in music, film, and television.
- Southside Johnny, eponymous leader of Southside Johnny and the Asbury Jukes was raised in Ocean Grove. He is considered the "Grandfather of the New Jersey Sound" and is cited by Jersey-born Jon Bon Jovi as his reason for singing.
- Jon Bon Jovi, from Sayreville, reached fame in the 1980s with hard rock outfit Bon Jovi. The band has also written many songs about life in New Jersey, including "Livin' On A Prayer", and named one of their albums after the state.
- Grammy-winning jazz vocalist Sarah Vaughan was born and raised in Newark. After singing in her church's choir as a child, she was sneaking into Newark nightclubs to sing and play piano by the time she was a teenager.
- In 1964, the Isley Brothers founded the record label T-Neck Records, named after Teaneck, their home at the time.
- The Broadway musical Jersey Boys is based on the lives of the members of the Four Seasons, three of whose members were born in New Jersey (Tommy DeVito, Frankie Valli, and Nick Massi) while a fourth, Bob Gaudio, was born in the Bronx but raised in Bergenfield.

== Sports ==
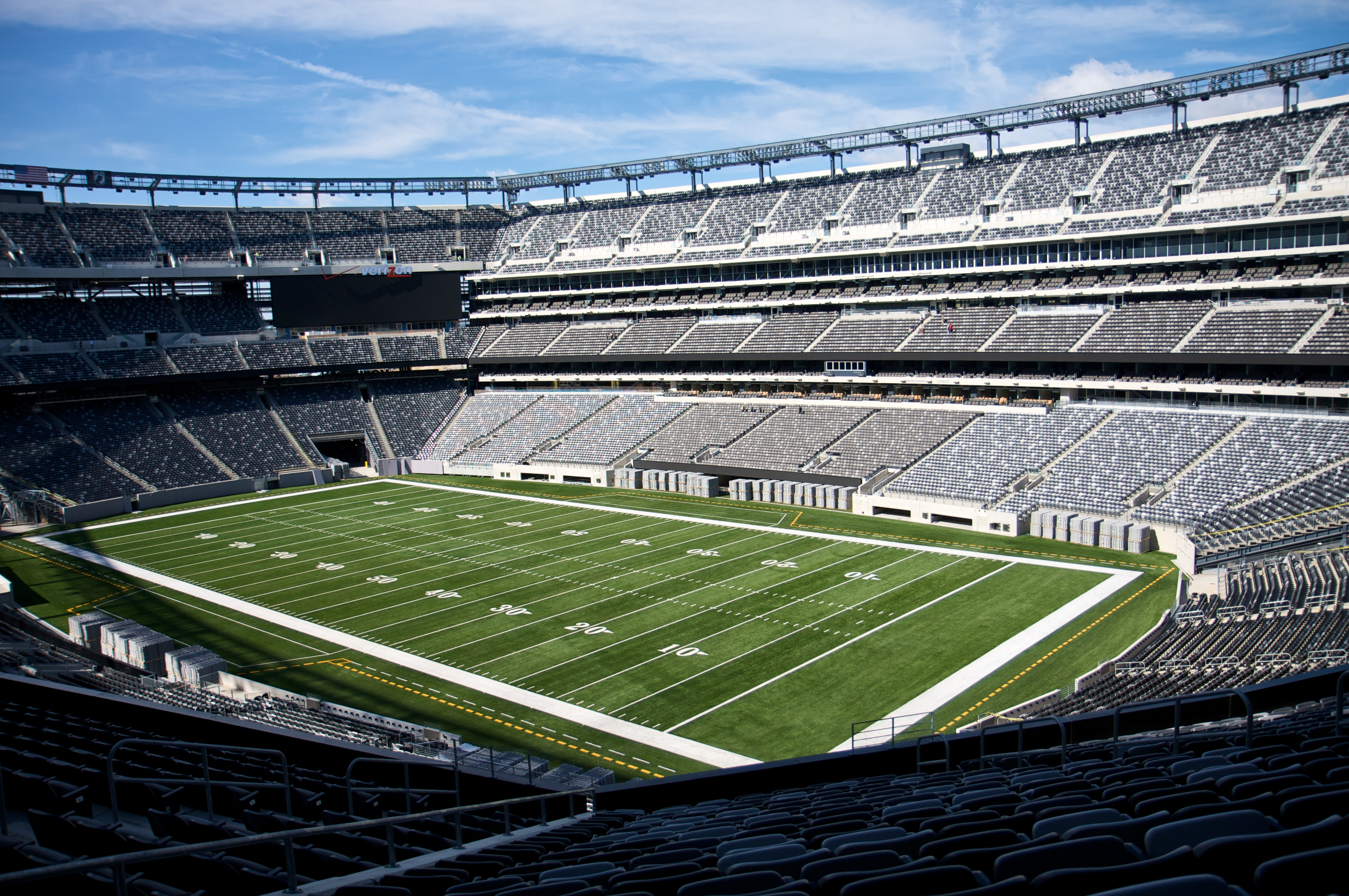
MetLife Stadium in East Rutherford, one of only two NFL stadiums shared by two teams, is home to the New York Giants and New York Jets.

New Jersey currently has six teams from major professional sports leagues playing in the state with only one team identifying themselves as solely being from New Jersey. The remaining five teams identify themselves as being from the New York metropolitan area with the National Women's Soccer League team having a team name that represents both New Jersey and New York. The National Hockey League and National Basketball Association teams representing Philadelphia have their training facilities in South Jersey.

=== Professional sports ===
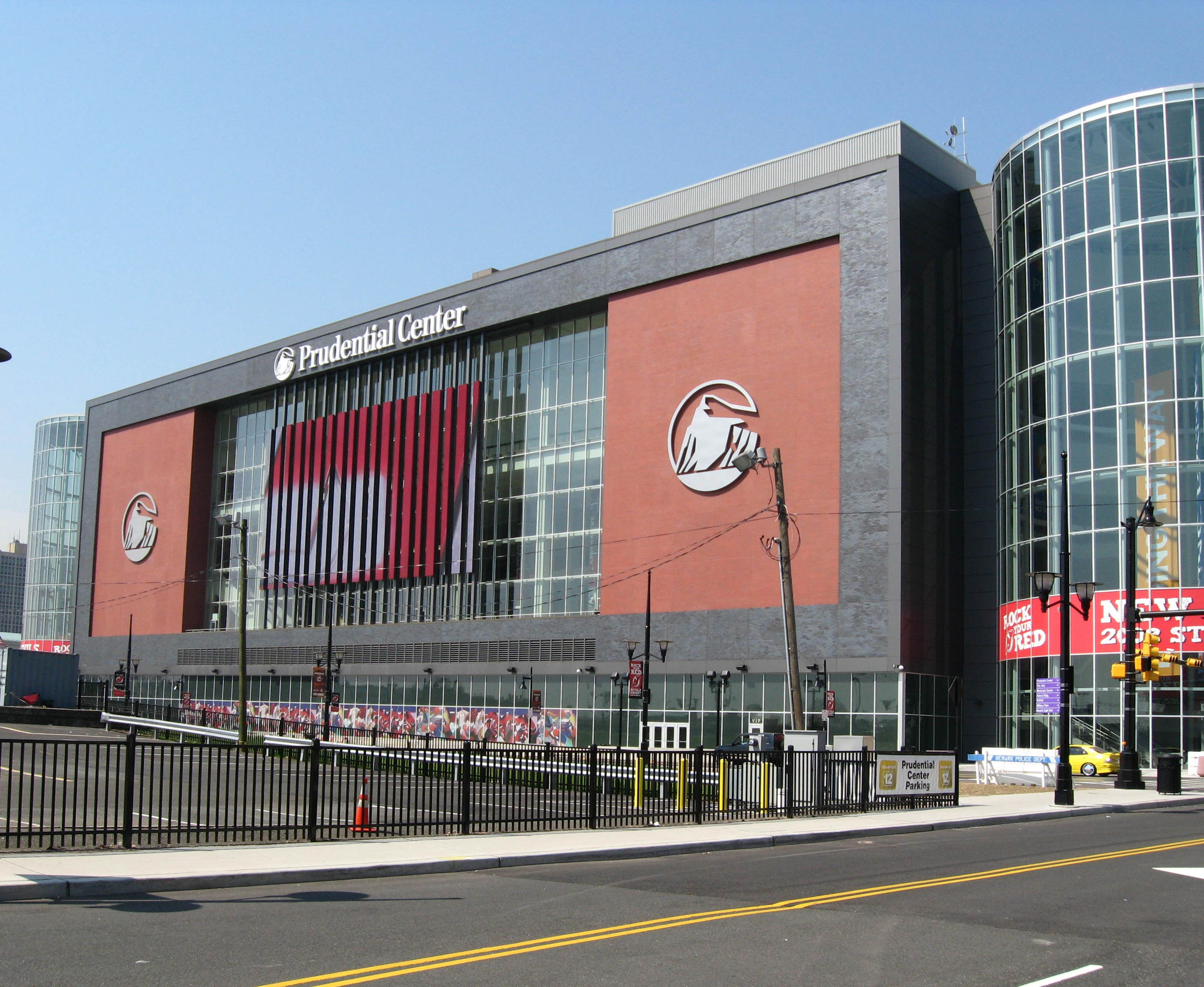
Prudential Center in Newark, home of the NHL's New Jersey Devils

The National Hockey League's New Jersey Devils, based in Newark at the Prudential Center, is the only major league sports franchise to bear the state's name. Founded in 1974 in Kansas City, Missouri, as the Kansas City Scouts, the team played in Denver, Colorado, as the Colorado Rockies from 1976 until the spring of 1982 when naval architect, businessman, and Jersey City native John J. McMullen purchased, renamed, and moved the franchise to Brendan Byrne Arena in East Rutherford's Meadowlands Sports Complex. While the team was poor to mediocre in Kansas City, Denver, and its first years in New Jersey, qualifying for the playoffs once in the 13 seasons from 1974 to 1987, the Devils ultimately established themselves in late 1980s and early 1990s during the tenure of Hall of Fame president and general manager Lou Lamoriello. As of 2023, the Devils have appeared in 23 postseasons in 40 seasons in New Jersey, reaching five Stanley Cup Finals (most recently in 2012) and winning it in 1995, 2000, and 2003. The organization is the youngest of the nine "Big Four" major league teams based in New York metropolitan area, ultimately establishing its core following throughout the northern and central portions of the state and carving a place in a media market once dominated by the New York Rangers and Islanders which has the distinction of being the only metropolitan area in the country with three major league professional sports teams participating in the same sport.

In 2018, the Philadelphia Flyers renovated and expanded their training facility, the Virtua Center Flyers Skate Zone, in Voorhees Township in the southern portion of the state.

In 2024, the New York Sirens of the Professional Women's Hockey League (PWHL) made the Prudential Center their home rink and moved their practice facility to the Richard J. Codey Arena in West Orange, the former Devil's practice facility from 1986 to 2007.

The New York metropolitan area's two National Football League teams, the New York Giants and the New York Jets, play at MetLife Stadium in East Rutherford's Meadowlands Sports Complex. Built for about $1.6 billion, the venue is one of the most expensive stadiums ever built. On February 2, 2014, MetLife Stadium hosted Super Bowl XLVIII.

The New York Red Bulls of Major League Soccer play in Sports Illustrated Stadium, a soccer-specific stadium in Harrison across the Passaic River from downtown Newark. On July 27, 2011, Red Bull Arena hosted the 2011 MLS All-Star Game. Gotham FC of the National Women's Soccer League (NWSL), founded in 2008 as Sky Blue FC, moved its home field from Yurcak Field at Rutgers University to Sports Illustrated Stadium in 2020.

New Jersey hosted matches during the 1994 FIFA World Cup at Giants Stadium. Over three decades later, New Jersey hosted matches during the 2026 FIFA World Cup, at MetLife Stadium, including the tournament final.

From 1977 to 2012, New Jersey had a National Basketball Association team, the New Jersey Nets. WNBA's New York Liberty played in New Jersey from 2011 to 2013 while their primary home arena, Madison Square Garden was undergoing renovations. In 2016, the Philadelphia 76ers of the NBA opened their new headquarters and training facility, the Philadelphia 76ers Training Complex, in Camden.

The Meadowlands Sports Complex is home to the Meadowlands Racetrack, the major harness racing track in the state. Monmouth Park Racetrack in Oceanport is a popular spot for thoroughbred racing in New Jersey and the northeast. It hosted the Breeders' Cup in 2007, and its turf course was renovated in preparation.

=== Major league sports ===
Club	Sport	League	Stadium (capacity)	Established	Titles
New Jersey Devils	Ice hockey	NHL	Prudential Center (16,514)	1974	3
New York Sirens	Ice hockey	PWHL	Prudential Center (16,514)	2023	0
New York Red Bulls	Soccer	MLS	Sports Illustrated Stadium (25,000)	1994	0
Gotham FC	Soccer	NWSL	Sports Illustrated Stadium (25,000)	2007	3
New York Giants	Football	NFL	MetLife Stadium (82,500)	1925	8
New York Jets	Football	NFL	MetLife Stadium (82,500)	1959	1

=== Minor league sports ===
Club	Sport	League	Stadium (capacity)	Established	Titles
Somerset Patriots	Baseball	MiLB (Eastern League)	TD Bank Ballpark (6,100)	1997	7
Jersey Shore BlueClaws	Baseball	MiLB (South Atlantic League)	ShoreTown Ballpark (6,588 )	1987	3
Trenton Thunder	Baseball	MLB Draft League	Trenton Thunder Ballpark (6,440)	1980	5
New Jersey Jackals	Baseball	Frontier League	Hinchliffe Stadium (10,000)	1998	6
Sussex County Miners	Baseball	Frontier League	Skylands Stadium (4,200)	2015	1
New York Red Bulls II	Soccer	MLS Next Pro	MSU Soccer Park at Pittser Field (5,000)	2015	2
New York Cosmos	Soccer	USL League One	Hinchliffe Stadium (10,000)	2026	0

=== College sports ===
==== Major schools ====
New Jerseyans' collegiate allegiances are predominantly split among the three major NCAA Division I programs in the state: the Rutgers University (New Jersey's flagship state university) Scarlet Knights, members of the Big Ten Conference; the Seton Hall University (the state's largest Catholic university) Pirates, members of the Big East Conference; and the Princeton University (the state's Ivy League university) Tigers.

The intense rivalry between Rutgers and Princeton athletics began with the first intercollegiate football game in 1869. The schools have not met on the football field since 1980, but they continue to play each other annually in all other sports offered by the two universities.

Rutgers, which fields 24 teams in various sports, is nationally known for its football program, with a 6–4 all-time bowl record; and its women's basketball programs, which appeared in a National Final in 2007. In 2008 and 2009, Rutgers expanded their football home, Rutgers Stadium, now called SHI Stadium, on the Busch Campus. The basketball teams play at the Rutgers Athletic Center on Livingston Campus. Both venues and campuses are in Piscataway, across the Raritan River from New Brunswick. The university also fields men's basketball and baseball programs. Rutgers' fans live mostly in the western parts of the state and Middlesex County; its alumni base is the largest in the state.

Rutgers' satellite campuses in Camden and Newark each field their own athletic programs—the Rutgers–Camden Scarlet Raptors and the Rutgers–Newark Scarlet Raiders—which both compete in NCAA Division III.

Seton Hall fields no football team, but its men's basketball team is one of the Big East's storied programs. No New Jersey team has won more games in the NCAA Division I men's basketball tournament, and it is the state's only men's basketball program to reach a modern National Final. The Pirates play their home games at Prudential Center in downtown Newark, about 4 miles (6 km) from the university's South Orange campus. Their fans hail largely from the predominantly Roman Catholic areas of the northern part of the state and the Jersey Shore. The annual inter-conference rivalry game between Seton Hall and Rutgers, whose venue alternates between Newark and Piscataway, the Garden State Hardwood Classic, is planned through 2026.

==== Other schools ====
The state's other Division I schools include the Monmouth University Hawks (West Long Branch), the New Jersey Institute of Technology (NJIT) Highlanders (Newark), the Rider University Broncs (Lawrenceville), and the Saint Peter's University Peacocks (Jersey City).

Fairleigh Dickinson University competes in both Division I and Division III. It has two campuses, each with its own sports teams. The teams at the Metropolitan Campus are known as the FDU Knights, and compete in the Northeast Conference and NCAA Division I. The college at Florham (FDU-Florham) teams are known as the FDU-Florham Devils and compete in the Middle Atlantic Conferences' Freedom Conference and NCAA Division III.

Among the various Division III schools in the state, the Stevens Institute of Technology Ducks have fielded the longest continuously running collegiate men's lacrosse program in the country. 2009 marked the 125th season.

=== High school ===
New Jersey high schools are divided into divisions under the New Jersey State Interscholastic Athletic Association (NJSIAA).'

== Stadiums and arenas ==
Venue	City	Capacity	Type	Tenants	Opened
SHI Stadium	Piscataway	52,454	Stadium	Rutgers Scarlet Knights	1994
Jadwin Gymnasium	Princeton	6,854	Arena	Princeton Tigers	1969
Rutgers Athletic Center	Piscataway	8,000	Arena	Rutgers Scarlet Knights	1977
MetLife Stadium	East Rutherford	82,500	Stadium	New York Giants, New York Jets	2010
Princeton Stadium	Princeton	27,800	Stadium	Princeton Tigers	1998
Prudential Center	Newark	18,711	Arena	New Jersey Devils, New York Sirens, Seton Hall Pirates	2007
Sports Illustrated Stadium	Harrison	25,000	Stadium	New York Red Bulls, Gotham FC	2010

=== Other notable sports venues ===
- Old Bridge Township Raceway Park
- Trenton Speedway
- Atlantic City Race Course
- Freehold Raceway
- Garden State Park Racetrack
- Monmouth Park Racetrack
- Meadowlands Sports Complex
  - Meadowlands Arena
  - Meadowlands Racetrack
  - Meadowlands Grand Prix

== Government and politics ==
=== Executive ===
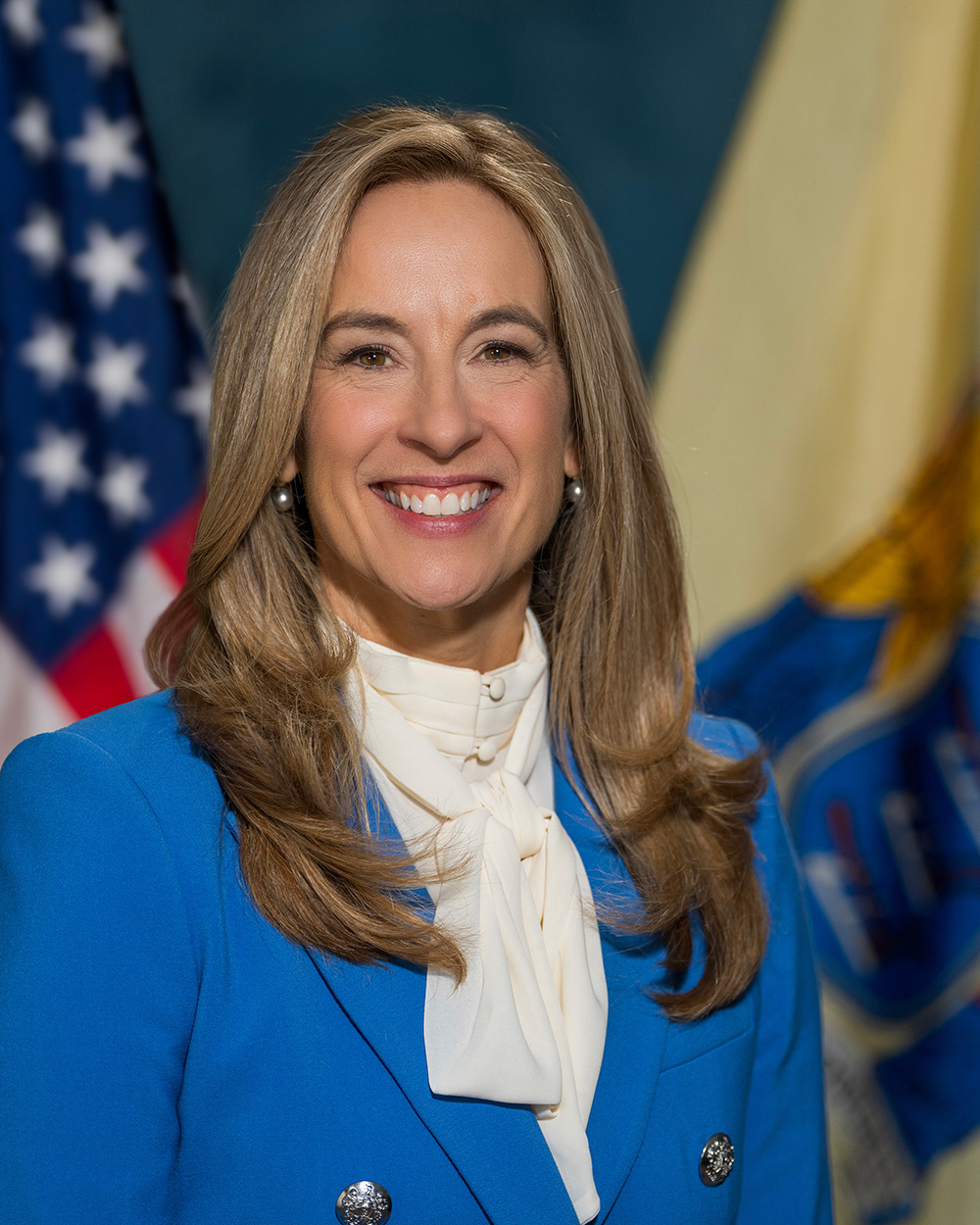
Mikie Sherrill (D)
57th governor
since January 20, 2026

The position of Governor of New Jersey is one of the most powerful in the nation. The governor is elected on a ticket with their lieutenant governor as the only statewide elected executive officials in the state; the governor appoints the entire executive cabinet and judges of the Supreme and Superior Courts. Mikie Sherrill (D) is the governor. The governor's mansion is Drumthwacket, located in Princeton, Mercer County.

Before 2010, New Jersey was one of the few states without a lieutenant governor. Republican Kim Guadagno was elected the first lieutenant governor of New Jersey on the Republican ticket with Governor Chris Christie and took office on January 19, 2010. The position was created as the result of a Constitutional amendment to the New Jersey State Constitution passed by the voters in 2005. Previously a gubernatorial vacancy would be filled by the president of the New Jersey State Senate as acting governor, thus directing half of the legislative and all of the executive process. The position of lieutenant governor is vacant following the resignation of Dale Caldwell (D).

=== Legislative ===
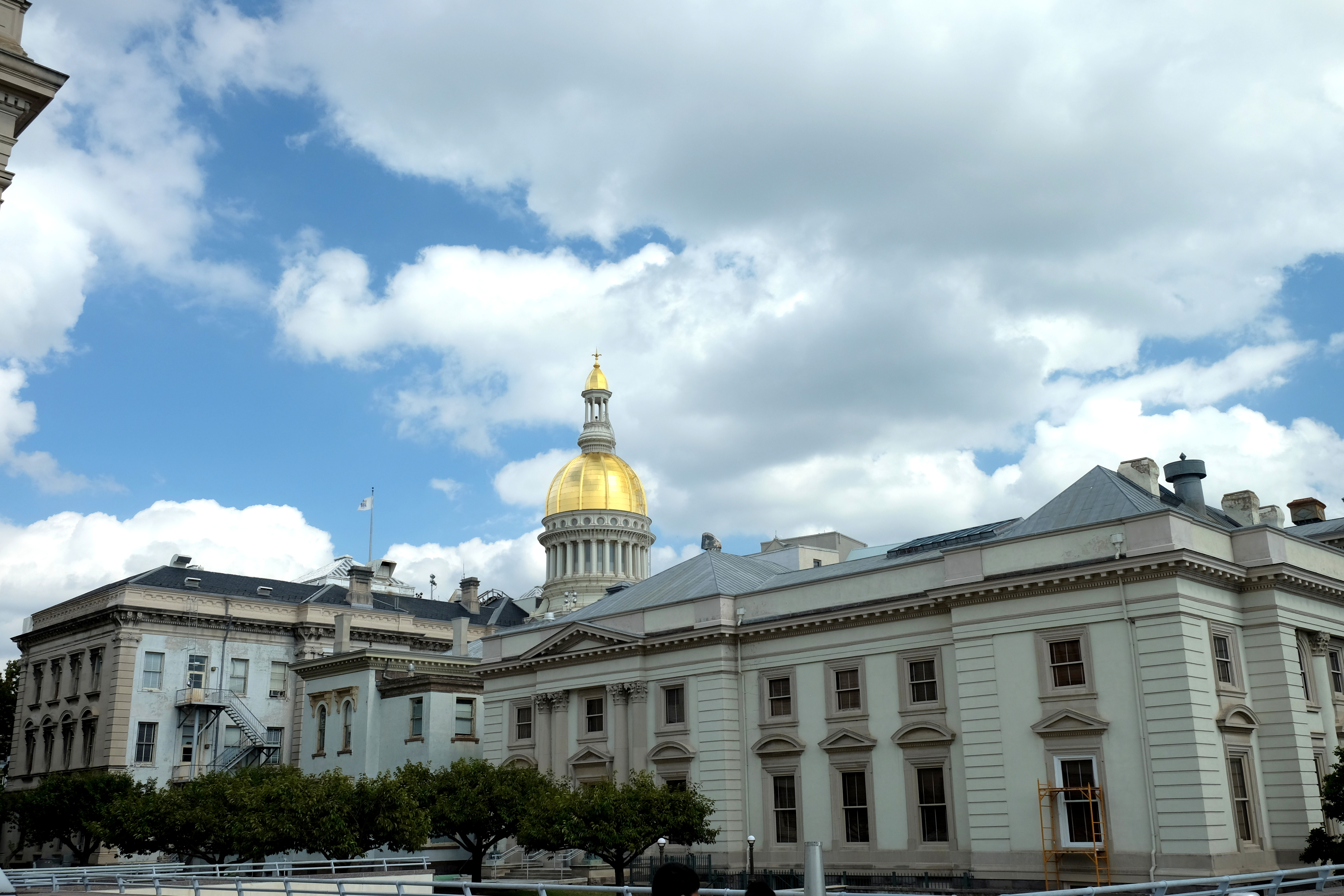
The design of the golden-domed New Jersey State House in Trenton differs from most other U.S. state houses in not resembling the U.S. Capitol.

The current version of the New Jersey State Constitution was adopted in 1947. It provides for a bicameral New Jersey Legislature, consisting of an upper house Senate of 40 members and a lower house General Assembly of 80 members. Each of the 40 legislative districts elects one state senator and two Assembly members. Assembly members are elected for a two-year term in all odd-numbered years; state senators are elected in years ending in 1, 3, and 7 and thus serve either four- or two-year terms.

New Jersey is one of only five states that elects its state officials in odd-numbered years (the others are Kentucky, Louisiana, Mississippi, and Virginia). New Jersey holds elections for these offices every four years, in the year following each federal Presidential election year.

=== Judicial ===
The New Jersey Supreme Court consists of a chief justice and six associate justices. All are appointed by the governor with the advice and consent of a majority of the membership of the state senate. Justices serve an initial seven-year term, after which they can be reappointed to serve until age 70.

Most of the day-to-day work in the New Jersey courts is carried out in the Municipal Court, where simple traffic tickets, minor criminal offenses, and small civil matters are heard.

More serious criminal and civil cases are handled by the Superior Court for each county. All Superior Court judges are appointed by the governor with the advice and consent of a majority of the membership of the state senate. Each judge serves an initial seven-year term and can be reappointed to serve until age 70. New Jersey's judiciary is unusual in that it still has separate courts of law and equity, like its neighbor Delaware but unlike most other U.S. states. The New Jersey Superior Court is divided into Law and Chancery Divisions at the trial level; the Law Division hears both criminal cases and civil lawsuits where the plaintiff's primary remedy is damages, while the Chancery Division hears family cases, civil suits where the plaintiff's primary remedy is equitable relief, and probate trials.

The Superior Court also has an Appellate Division, which functions as the state's intermediate appellate court. Superior Court judges are assigned to the Appellate Division by the chief justice.

There is also a Tax Court, which is a court of limited jurisdiction. Tax Court judges hear appeals of tax decisions made by County Boards of Taxation. They also hear appeals on decisions made by the director of the Division of Taxation on such matters as state income, sales and business taxes, and homestead rebates. Appeals from Tax Court decisions are heard in the Appellate Division of Superior Court. Tax Court judges are appointed by the governor for initial terms of seven years, and upon reappointment are granted tenure until they reach the mandatory retirement age of 70. There are 12 Tax Court judgeships.

=== Counties ===
New Jersey is divided into 21 counties; 13 date from the colonial era. New Jersey was completely divided into counties by 1692; the present counties were created by dividing the existing ones; most recently Union County in 1857. New Jersey was formerly the only state in the nation where elected county officials were called freeholders. Elected county officials are now called county commissioners as of bill S855 signed by Governor Murphy on August 8, 2020. The county commissioners govern each county as part of its own Board of Chosen County Commissioners The number of county commissioners in each county is determined by referendum, and must consist of three, five, seven or nine members.

Depending on the county, the executive and legislative functions may be performed by the Board of County Commissioners or split into separate branches of government. In 16 counties, the County Commissioners perform both legislative and executive functions on a commission basis, with each commissioner assigned responsibility for a department or group of departments. In the other five counties (Atlantic, Bergen, Essex, Hudson and Mercer), there is a directly elected County Executive who performs the executive functions while the commissioners retain a legislative and oversight role. In counties without an Executive, a County Administrator (or County Manager) may be hired to perform day-to-day administration of county functions.

=== Municipalities ===
New Jersey currently has 564 municipalities; the most recent dissolution of a municipality was when Pine Valley merged into Pine Hill on January 1, 2022. Unlike other states, all New Jersey land is part of a municipality. In 2008, Governor Jon Corzine proposed cutting state aid to all towns under 10,000 people, to encourage mergers to reduce administrative costs. In May 2009, the Local Unit Alignment Reorganization and Consolidation Commission began a study of about 40 small communities in South Jersey to decide which ones might be good candidates for consolidation.

==== Forms of municipal government ====
Starting in the 20th century, largely driven by reform-minded goals, a series of six modern forms of government was implemented. This began with the Walsh Act, enacted in 1911 by the New Jersey Legislature, which provided for a three- or five-member commission elected on a non-partisan basis. This was followed by the 1923 Municipal Manager Law, which offered a non-partisan council, provided for a weak mayor elected by and from the members of the council, and introduced a Council-manager government structure with an appointed manager responsible for the day-to-day administration of municipal affairs.

The Faulkner Act, originally enacted in 1950 and substantially amended in 1981, offers four basic plans: Mayor-Council, Council-Manager, Small Municipality, and Mayor-Council-Administrator. The act provides many choices for communities with a preference for a strong executive and professional management of municipal affairs and offers great flexibility in allowing municipalities to select the characteristics of its government: the number of seats on the council; seats selected at-large, by wards, or through a combination of both; staggered or concurrent terms of office; and a mayor chosen by the council or elected directly by voters. Most large municipalities and a majority of New Jersey's residents are governed by municipalities with Faulkner Act charters. Municipalities can also formulate their own unique form of government and operate under a Special Charter with the approval of the New Jersey Legislature.

While municipalities retain their names derived from types of government, they may have changed to one of the modern forms of government, or further in the past to one of the other traditional forms, leading to municipalities with formal names quite baffling to the general public. For example, though there are four municipalities that are officially of the village type, none use the village form of government. Loch Arbour and Ridgefield Park (now with a Walsh Act form), Ridgewood (now with a Faulkner Act Council-Manager charter) and South Orange (now operates under a Special Charter) all migrated to other non-village forms.

=== Politics ===
==== Social attitudes and issues ====
Socially, New Jersey is considered one of the more liberal states in the nation. Polls indicate that 60% of the population are self-described as pro-choice, although a majority are opposed to late trimester and intact dilation and extraction and public funding of abortion. As of 2022, all aspects of reproductive choice (including abortion) are protected by law.

In a 2009 Quinnipiac University Polling Institute poll, a plurality supported same-sex marriage 49% to 43% opposed. On October 18, 2013, the New Jersey Supreme Court rendered a provisional, unanimous (7–0) order authorizing same-sex marriage in the state, pending a legal appeal by Governor Chris Christie, who then withdrew this appeal hours after the inaugural same-sex marriages took place on October 21, 2013.

New Jersey also has some of the most stringent gun control laws in the U.S. These include bans on assault firearms, hollow-nose bullets and slingshots. No gun offense in New Jersey is graded less than a felony. BB guns and black-powder guns are all treated as modern firearms. New Jersey does not recognize out-of-state gun licenses and aggressively enforces its own gun laws.

In 2020, the state's voting population passed a public question that amended the state constitution to legalize marijuana and erase past legal convictions for possession. The measure passed by a two-thirds vote. At the time the measure was enacted, about a dozen other U.S. states had also legalized the sale and possession of marijuana. As of 2024, local governments and municipalities are still in the process of regulating marijuana-related businesses within their jurisdictions.

==== Elections ====
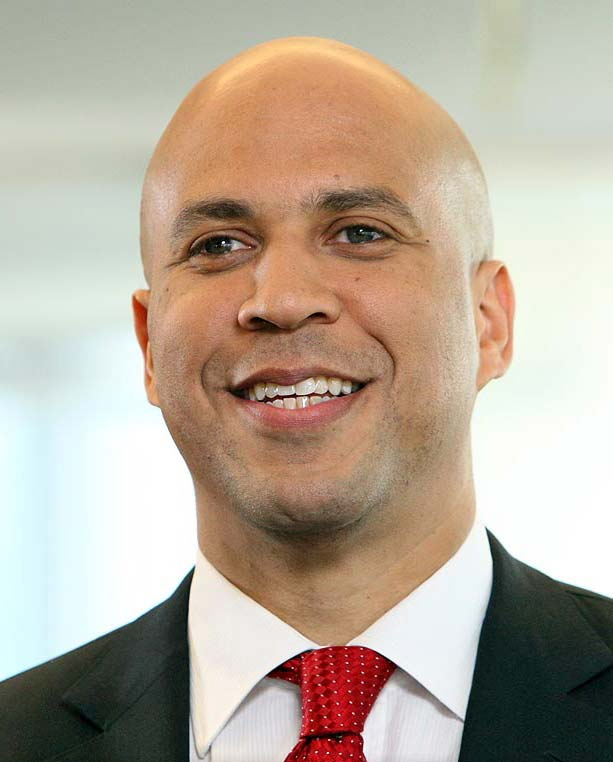
Cory Booker (D)
Senior U.S. Senator

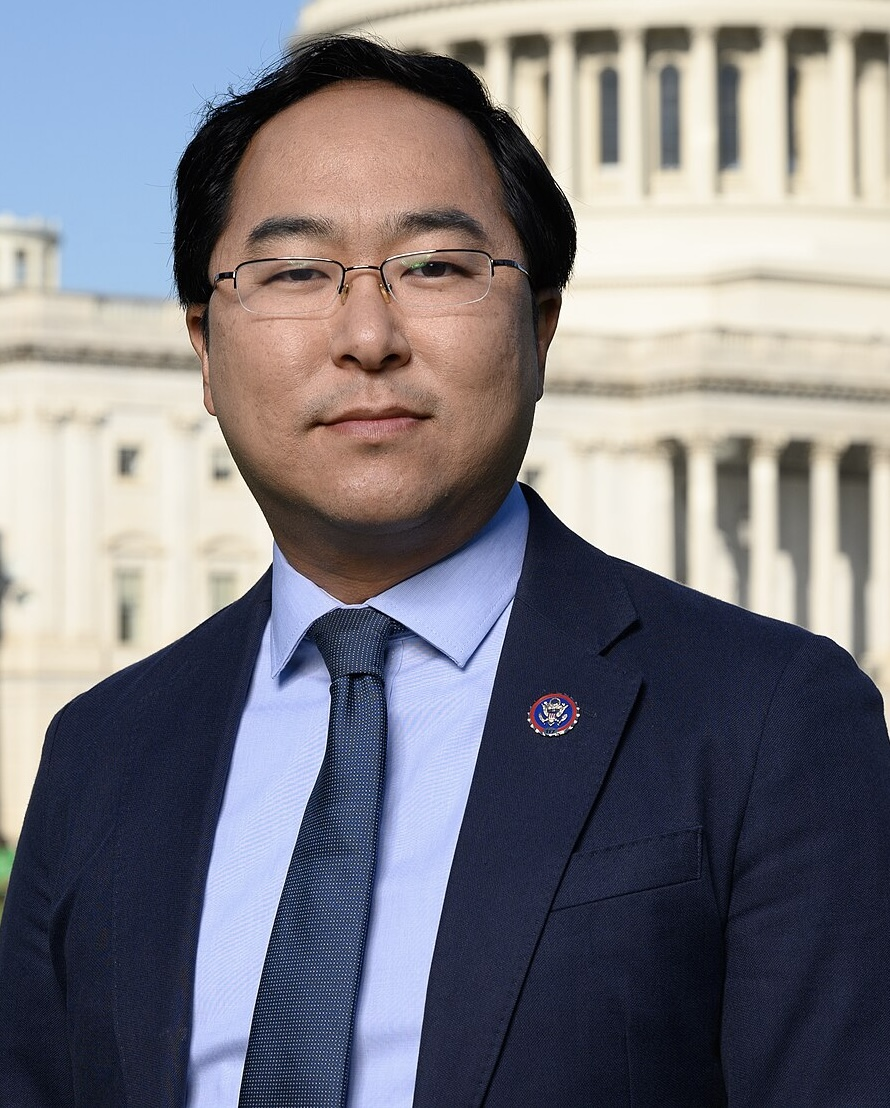
Andy Kim (D)
Junior U.S. Senator

New Jersey is a Democratic stronghold. New Jersey Democrats have majority control of both houses of the New Jersey Legislature (Senate, 24–16, and Assembly, 46–34), 9–3 split of the state's twelve seats in the U.S. House of Representatives, and both U.S. Senate seats. There have been recent Republican governors, however: Christine Todd Whitman won election in 1993 and 1997 and Chris Christie in 2009 and 2013.

In federal elections, the state leans heavily towards the Democratic Party, having last voted for a Republican for president in 1988. New Jersey was a crucial swing state in the elections of 1960, 1968, and 1992. The last elected Republican to hold a Senate seat from New Jersey was Clifford P. Case in 1979. Newark Mayor Cory Booker was elected in October 2013 to join Robert Menendez to make New Jersey the first state with concurrently serving black and Latino U.S. senators.

2024 U.S. presidential election results by county in New Jersey Democratic Republican

The state's Democratic strongholds include Camden County, Essex County (the state's most Democratic county—it includes Newark, the state's largest city), Hudson County (the second-strongest Democratic county, including Jersey City, the state's second-largest city); Mercer County (especially around Trenton and Princeton), Middlesex County, and Union County (including Elizabeth, the state's fourth-largest city). Other suburban counties, especially Bergen County and Burlington County, had the majority of votes go to the Democratic Party.

The northwestern and southeastern counties of the state are reliably Republican: Republicans have support along the coast in Ocean County and Cape May County as well as in the mountainous northwestern part of the state, especially in Hunterdon County, Sussex County, and Warren County.

To be eligible to vote in a U.S. election, all New Jerseyans are required to start their residency in the state 30 days prior to an election and register 21 days prior to election day.

==== Capital punishment ====
On December 17, 2007, Governor Jon Corzine signed into law a bill that would eliminate the death penalty in New Jersey. New Jersey was the first state to pass such legislation since Iowa and West Virginia eliminated executions in 1965. Corzine also signed a bill that would downgrade the Death Row prisoners' sentences from "Death" to "Life in Prison with No Parole".

== Points of interest ==
=== Boardwalks ===
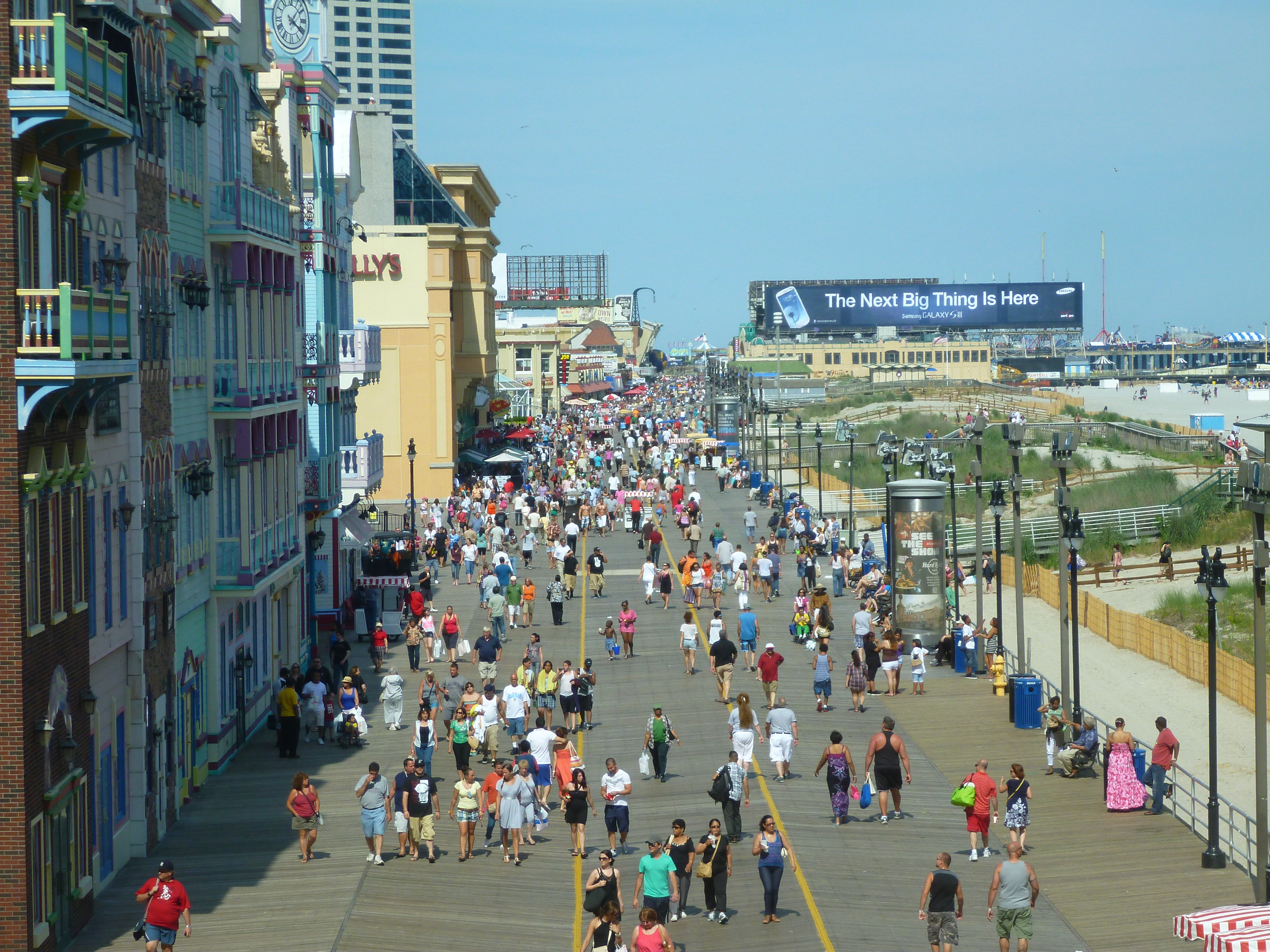
The Atlantic City Boardwalk seen from Caesars Atlantic City, which opened in 1870 as the world's first boardwalk At 5 1/2 miles (8.9 km) long, it is also the world's longest and busiest boardwalk. New Jersey is home to the world's highest concentration of boardwalks.

Many communities along the Jersey Shore have a boardwalk with various attractions, entertainment, shopping, dining, arcades, water parks, and amusement parks. The Atlantic City Boardwalk, opened in 1870, as the world's first boardwalk. At 5 1/2 miles (8.9 km) long, it is also the world's longest and busiest boardwalk.

Venue	Amusement park	Location	Year opened
Asbury Park Boardwalk	Asbury Splash Park	Asbury Park	1871
Atlantic City Boardwalk	Steel Pier	Atlantic City	1870
Jenkinson's Boardwalk	Jenkinson's Amusement Park	Point Pleasant Beach	1928
Ocean City Boardwalk	Playland's Castaway Cove	Ocean City	1929
Pier Village	None	Long Branch	2005
Seaside Heights Boardwalk	Casino Pier	Seaside Heights	1932
Wildwood Boardwalk	Morey's Piers	The Wildwoods	1969

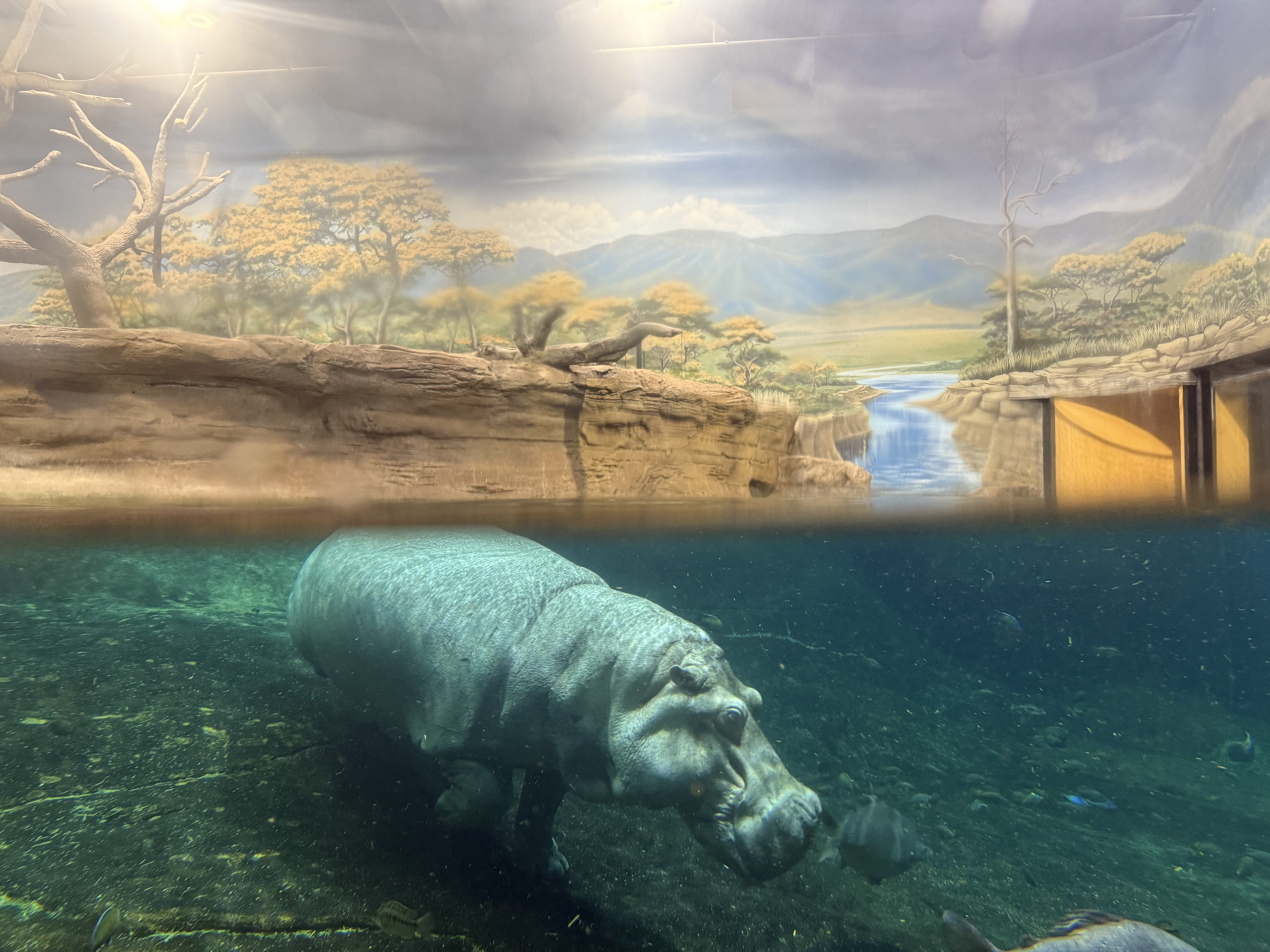
The Adventure Aquarium in Camden is the largest aquarium in New Jersey. It is home to two female hippopotamuses.

=== Museums ===
Museum	Location	Year opened	Type
New Jersey State Museum	Trenton	1895	General education
Franklin Mineral Museum	Franklin, Sussex County	1964	Mineral museum
Liberty Science Center	Liberty State Park, Jersey City	1993	Science museum
Maywood Station Museum	Maywood	2004	Railroad museum
Montclair Art Museum	Montclair	1914	Art museum
Newark Museum	Newark	1909	Natural science and art museum
Princeton University Art Museum	Princeton	1884	Art museum
Thomas Edison Center	Menlo Park	1938	Thomas Edison museum

=== National Park Service areas ===
- Appalachian National Scenic Trail
- Crossroads of the American Revolution
- Delaware Water Gap National Recreation Area
- Gateway National Recreation Area
- Great Egg Harbor National Scenic and Recreational River
- Morristown National Historical Park
- New Jersey Pinelands National Reserve
- Patterson Great Falls National Historical Park
- Statue of Liberty National Monument (with Ellis Island)
- Thomas Edison National Historical Park
- Washington-Rochambeau Revolutionary Route

=== Entertainment and concert venues ===
Visitors and residents take advantage of and contribute to performances at the numerous music, theater, and dance companies and venues located throughout the state, including:

Venue	Type	Location	Year opened
Prudential Center	Arena	Newark	2007
New Brunswick Performing Arts Center	Regional Theater	New Brunswick	2019
PNC Bank Arts Center	Amphitheater	Holmdel	1977
New Jersey Performing Arts Center	Concert Hall	Newark	1997
Paper Mill Playhouse	Regional Theater	Millburn	1968
State Theater	Regional Theater	New Brunswick	1921
Boardwalk Hall	Arena	Atlantic City	1926
Freedom Mortgage Pavilion	Amphitheater	Camden	1995
CURE Insurance Arena	Arena	Trenton	1999

=== Theme parks ===
Main park	Other parks	Location	Year opened
Clementon Amusement Park	Splash World	Clementon	1907
Diggerland		West Berlin	2014
DreamWorks Waterpark		East Rutherford	2020
Fantasy Island	Thundering Surf Water Park	Beach Haven	1985
The Funplex (Mount Laurel)	The Funplex (East Hanover)	Mount Laurel	
iPlay America		Freehold	2011
Keansburg Amusement Park	Runaway Rapids	Keansburg	1904
Land of Make Believe	Pirate's Cove	Hope	1954
Mountain Creek Waterpark		Vernon	1998
Nickelodeon Universe		East Rutherford	2019
Six Flags Great Adventure	Six Flags Hurricane Harbor	Jackson	1974
Storybook Land		Egg Harbor Township	1955
Wild West City		Stanhope	1957

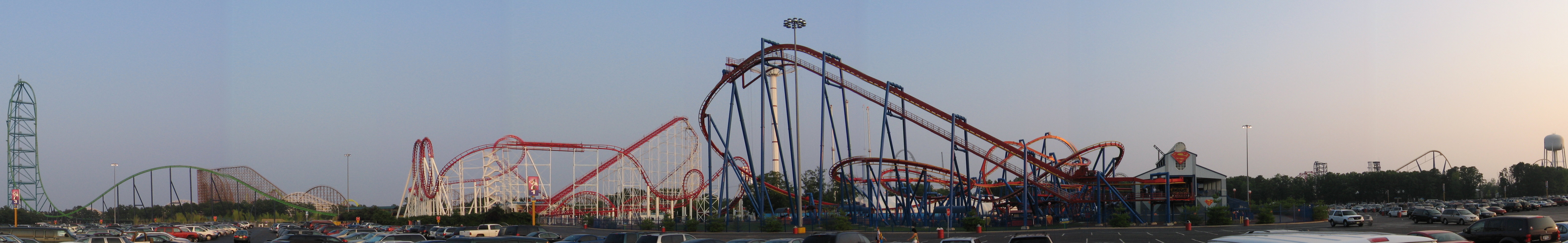
The skyline of Six Flags Great Adventure in Jackson Township in Ocean County, the world's largest theme park as of 2013 To the far left is Kingda Ka, the world's tallest roller coaster until its closure in 2024.

== See also ==
- Index of New Jersey–related articles
- List of people from New Jersey
- Outline of New Jersey
- COVID-19 pandemic in New Jersey
