= Gloucester County Times =

Newspaper in New Jersey, US

- Front Page August 8, 2011
- Type: Daily newspaper
- Format: Broadsheet
- Owner: Advance Publications
- Founded: 1897 (as Woodbury Daily Times)
- Ceased publication: 2012 (merged into the South Jersey Times)
- Language: American English
- Headquarters: 309 S. Broad St. Woodbury, New Jersey 08096
- Country: United States
- Circulation: 22,310 (Mon-Fri); 20,383 (Sat); 24,861 (Sun) (as of 2008)
- OCLC number: 11218944
- Website: www.nj.com/gloucester

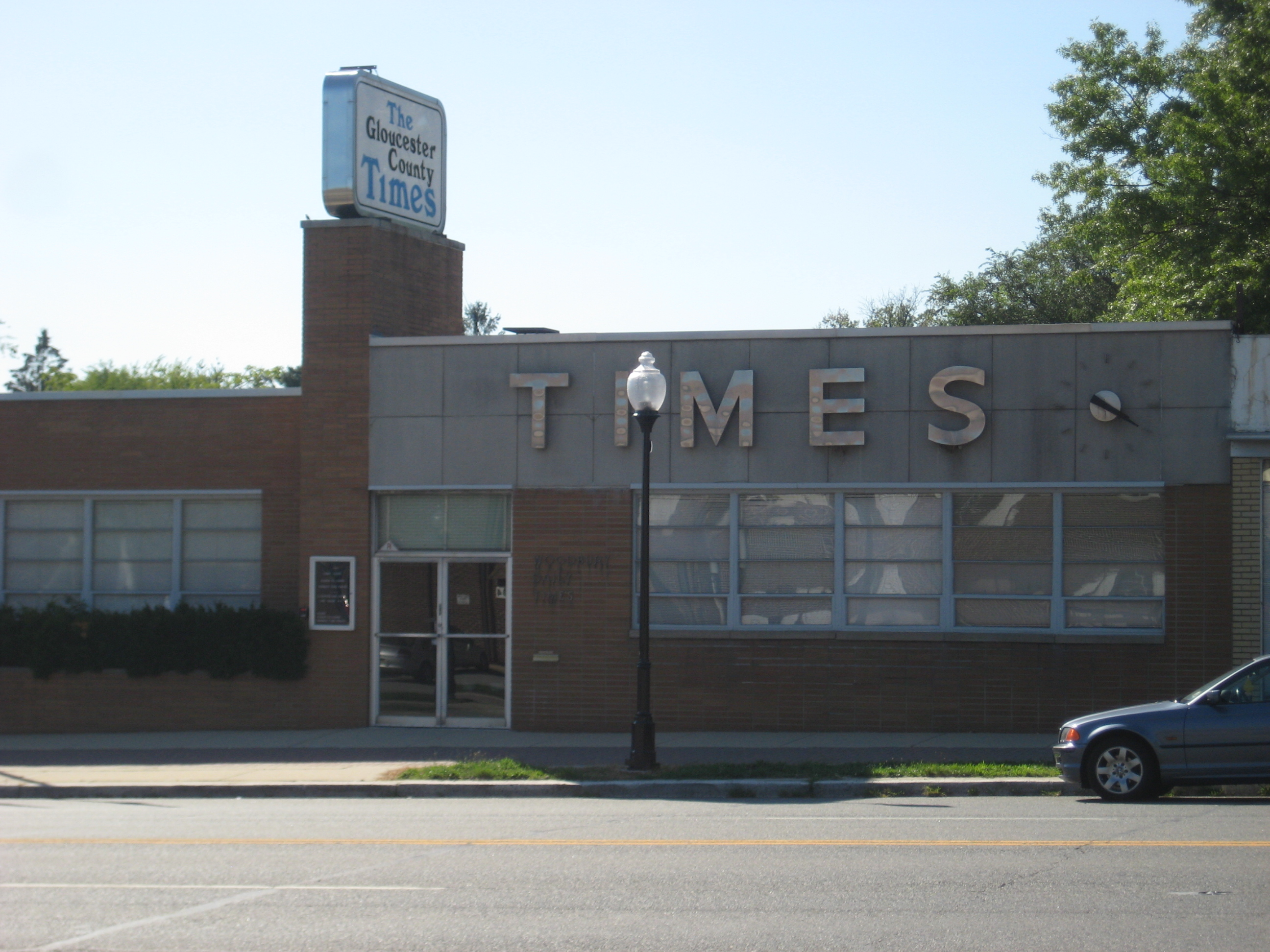
Gloucester County Times building

The Gloucester County Times (GCT) was a daily newspaper in Woodbury, New Jersey. It was founded in 1897 and ceased publication in 2012, when it merged with its sister papers Today's Sunbeam and The News of Cumberland County to form the South Jersey Times.

== History ==
The newspaper was founded as the Woodbury Daily Times in 1897 by J. Frank Wilson. Wilson and his partner C. Walter Hawn served as publishers. Upon Wilson's death, his son J. Frank Wilson, Jr., became managing editor on January 1, 1918. The Wilson family continued to own and run the paper for the next several decades; Jack. H. Wilson served as managing publisher from 1965 to 1972. During this time paper added a Sunday edition and changed its name to the Gloucester County Times; it also expanded its coverage to include all of Gloucester County as well as Burlington and Salem counties. The Wilson family sold the paper to Harte-Hanks Newspapers of San Antonio, Texas in 1972. Its main competitors were The Philadelphia Inquirer across the Delaware River in Pennsylvania, and the Courier-Post in South Jersey.

Harte-Hanks sold the Gloucester County Times to William Dean Singleton and Richard Scudder in 1983, becoming the first paper owned by MediaNews Group.

Advance Publications bought MediaNews' New Jersey and Pennsylvania newspapers in 2000.

In 2012 the Times was merged with two other Advance Publications papers from the South Jersey area, Today's Sunbeam and The News of Cumberland County, to form the South Jersey Times. It published its last issue on November 3, 2012.
