= Today's Sunbeam =

- Type: Daily newspaper
- Format: Broadsheet
- Owner: Advance Publications
- Founded: 1819 (originally the Salem Messenger)
- Ceased publication: 2012 (merged into the South Jersey Times)
- Language: American English
- Headquarters: Salem, New Jersey
- Circulation: 9,606 (Mon-Fri); 8,484 (Sat); 9,279 (Sun) (as of 2008)
- ISSN: 0890-9830
- OCLC number: 14513784
- Website: www.todaysunbeam.com

Today's Sunbeam was a daily newspaper in Salem, New Jersey, United States. Founded in 1819, it ceased publication in 2012 when it merged with its sister papers the Gloucester County Times and The News of Cumberland County to form the South Jersey Times.

== History ==
The paper was founded in 1819 as the Salem Messenger, serving only the town of Salem, New Jersey. The name was later changed to the Salem Sunbeam. In 1972 the Salem Sunbeam merged with four other local papers, Woodstown Monitor-Register, Penns Grove Sun, Pennsville Progress, and Salem Standard and Jerseyman, to form a new paper covering Salem County. The new paper was called the Sunbeam, later Today's Sunbeam. The paper's chief competitors were The Philadelphia Inquirer across the Delaware River in Pennsylvania, and the Courier-Post and Burlington County Times in South Jersey. MediaNews Group acquired Today's Sunbeam in 1990. Advance Publications bought MediaNews' New Jersey and Pennsylvania newspapers in 2000. In 2012, the Sunbeam was merged with two other Advance Publications papers, Gloucester County Times and The News of Cumberland County, to form the South Jersey Times.
