= List of museums with Soap Box Derby racers =

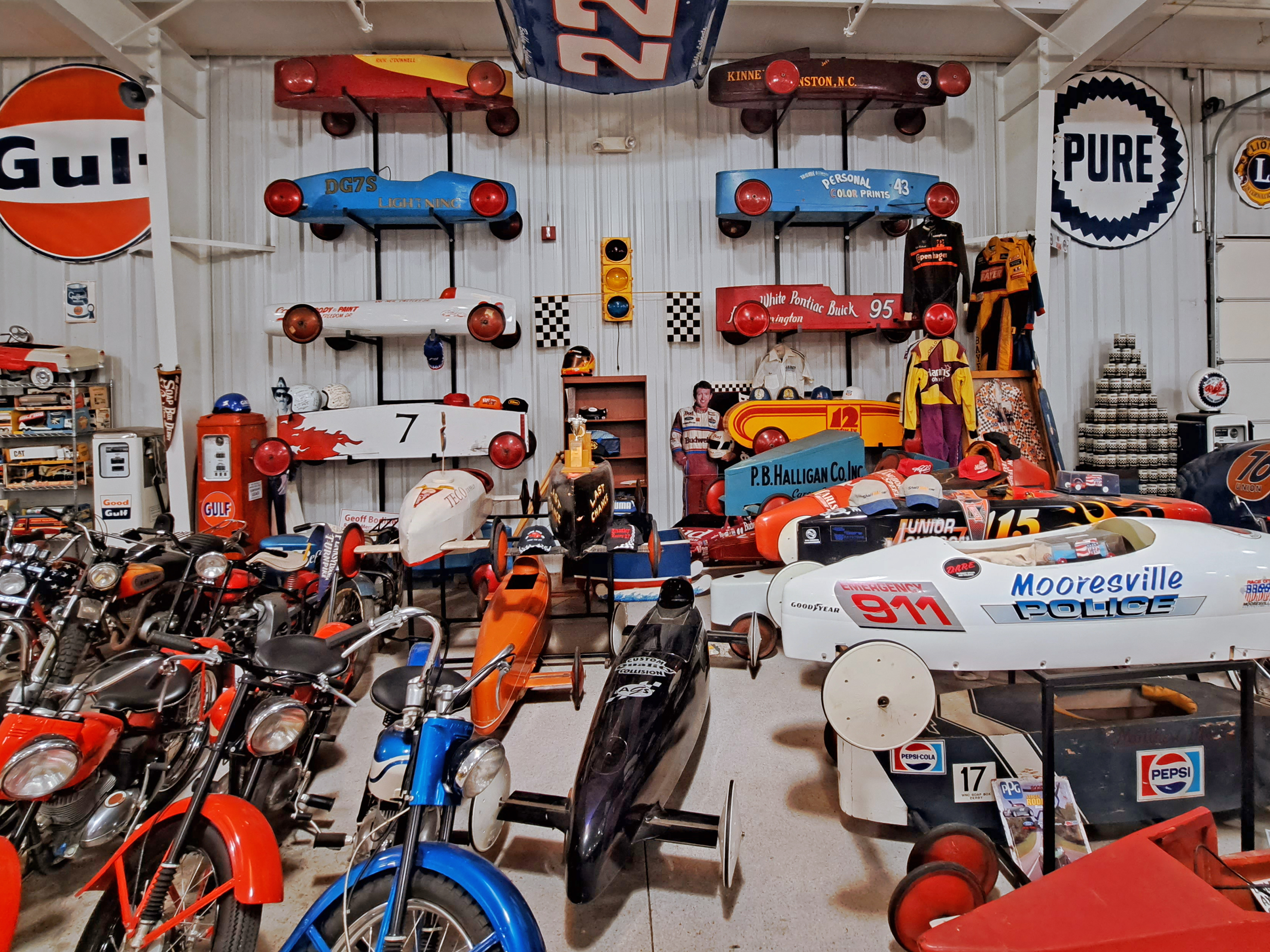
Vintage Soap Box Derby racers on exhibit at Memory Lane Museum, a private automotive and transportation museum located in Mooresville, North Carolina

The Soap Box Derby is a youth-oriented soap box car racing program which has been running in the United States since 1934. Proclaimed "the greatest amateur racing event in the world", the program culminates each July at the FirstEnergy All-American Soap Box Derby World Championship held at Derby Downs in Akron, Ohio, with winners from their local communities from across the US and abroad travelling to compete.

Since the Soap Box Derby's creation, numerous kid-built racers have been retired, most of them probably meeting their demise, or ending up in attics, basements or garages. Some of the survivors have made their way into public venues like bars and restaurants as decorative examples of Americana, or have been exhibited in museums honoring Soap Box Derby's heritage as an American institution.

== Museums with Soap Box Derby racers ==
Below is a list of various museums and historical institutions as well as venues open to the public that have in the past or are currently exhibiting Soap Box Derby racers or adding them to their permanent collections, usually acquired via donation by the cars' original owners.

| Name | City | State | Year | Notes | Status | Image |
|---|---|---|---|---|---|---|
| 52nd International Old Opel IG Annual Meeting | Troisdorf | Germany | 2025 | The city of Troisdorf hosted the 52nd gathering of historic Opel vehicles and their enthusiasts from all over Europe to an open-air exhibit near the Troisdorf Town Hall. Exhibited was an Opel-era German Derby racer alongside other artifacts manufactured by Opel AG. | Was on exhibit | |
| 54th Street Grill and Bar | Blue Springs | Missouri | Current | This restaurant chain has two locations with a Derby car on display in each, located in Blue Springs, Missouri and Edwardsville, Illinois. | On exhibit | |
| Aberdeen Museum of History | Aberdeen | Washington | 2018 (Note: Most recent confirmed date) | Has two 1960s cars on exhibit, both piloted by Ed Gegen, located in its hot rod garage diorama. | On exhibit | |
| A. J. Phillips Fenton Museum | Fenton | Michigan | Current | Has a single racer piloted by Cliff Swartz (1936—2003),14, of Fenton, Michigan, who won the Flint, Michigan local race in 1950 and competed at the 13th All-American Nationals in Akron, Ohio, wining his first two heats. The black racer is on exhibit, standing on end. | On exhibit | |
| Akron History Center | Akron | Ohio | Current | Opening 15 April 2025 to the public, the nascent Akron History Center hosts artifacts from Akron's extensive 200-year history, including a Derby car (pictured) piloted by 1948 World Champion Donald Strub (1934–2020). Pictured in 2016 at the Soap Box Derby Hall of Fame Museum at Derby Downs, the extant car is found suspended over the central staircase. | On exhibit | |
| Albany Regional Museum | Albany | Oregon | Current | Hosted an exhibit in 2023 titled Hub City, which featured in the children's area a transportation-themed display comprising two Derby cars that visiting kids could climb into. Among them was a racer piloted by 2010 Super Stock World Champion Tucker McClaran. (Note: Tucker McClaran, who hails from Salem, Oregon, competed in the Ultimate Speed Challenge Division in 2015, placing 2nd.) Another car piloted by Allen Blake, who competed as a class A entry in Salem, OR in 1953 and 1954, is exhibited as well. | On exhibit | |
| A Little BBQ Joint | Independence | Missouri | Current | This eatery has, among its decorative collection of Americana, two Derby cars hanging from the ceiling, including one that was piloted by 1965 Kansas City, Missouri Champion Steven James White. At the National Championship in Akron, Ohio a month after winning in Kansas City, White made it to the second round of competition, winning his first heat. | On exhibit | |
| Allen County Museum and Historical Society | Lima | Ohio | Current | Has a racer (illustration pictured) from 1971 Lima, Ohio Champion James Ethan Jackson. The car is not on public display. | Collection only | |
| Allegheny Museum | Cumberland | Maryland | 2015 | Has a racer piloted by 1949 Cumberland, Maryland Champion Neil Jones, donated in 2015 and exhibited the same year. | In collection | |
| All Sports Museum of Southern New Jersey | Bridgeton | New Jersey | Current | Has a collection of Derby memorabilia, including a racer (illustration pictured) piloted by Marvin Rammel, who competed in the Bridgeton, New Jersey local race in 1940. Rammel had the car restored to its original red and sponsor livery, and donated it to the Museum in 1991. | On exhibit | |
| America on Wheels Auto Museum | Allentown | Pennsylvania | 2010 | Hosted an exhibit (pictured) of numerous Derby cars. | Was on exhibit | |
| American Treasure Tour Museum | Oaks | Pennsylvania | Current | Has on exhibit a few Derby cars, including a blue class A entry from New Castle, Pennsylvania piloted by Ronnie Boy, who won the Best Constructed Award in 1970. | On exhibit | |
| Anderson County Museum | Anderson | South Carolina | 2022 | Hosts an exhibit with a 1940 Derby car said to be from the community, along with a helmet and race jersey from 1941 Anderson Champ Joseph E. Harbin displayed above. | On exhibit | |
| Antique Automobile Club of America, or AACA | Hershey | Pennsylvania | 2012 | Exhibited two cars piloted by 1971 York, Pennsylvania Champion Glenn Dale Laughman and 1972 York, Pennsylvania Champion Debbie Laughman. | Was on exhibit | |
| Aroma Guesthouse | Aeroskobing | Denmark | 2025 | A tourist accommodation on the Danish Baltic Sea island of Ærø in SE Denmark, the guesthouse has in their Tintin guest room a post Opel-era German Derby racer hung decoratively on the wall. | On display | |
| The Bag Factory | Goshen | Indiana | 2022 | A retail facility in an historic property has a Derby car piloted by 1994 Goshen Masters Rally Champion Greg Koop suspended above the retail floor. | On exhibit | |
| Beaver Falls Historical Society Museum | Beaver Falls | Pennsylvania | 2017 | Exhibited a racer (illustration pictured) piloted by 1969 Beaver Falls Champion Robert Javens. | Was on exhibit | |
| Beech Creek/Marsh Creek Watershed Heritage Museum | Orviston | Pennsylvania | Current | Has a 1963 class A racer donated in 2019 by builder/owner Steve Rhoads. | On exhibit | |
| Behringer-Crawford Museum | Covington | Kentucky | 2021 | Located in the Roads Gallery on the second level of the museum is an artistically painted Derby car named Lucky Lisa, which was piloted by Cincinnati, Ohio entrant Lisa Luthy. The car received Best Upholstered distinction in 1972. A second car that Luthy raced in 1975 is in the collection of the Kentucky Historical Society (see below). | On exhibit | |
| Belfast Historical Society and Museum | Belfast | Maine | Current | Has a car (illustration pictured) piloted by Belfast, Maine class B racer Butch Richards, who competed in 1966 and 1967 in the Bangor, Maine statewide Derby race. Donated to the museum in 2022 it was announced that it would be put on display in the near future. | Collection | |
| Big Putts Mini Golf | Greenfield | Wisconsin | 2025 | Has at this family-oriented recreational facility an interactive display of a red laydown Derby car that was piloted by 1977 Racine, Wisconsin Champion Rob Lemerond. | On exhibit | |
| Blackstone's Smokehouse | Flint | Michigan | Current | Has a car piloted by 1958 Flint, Michigan Champion Dwight Harley Polzin, 15, who competed as a class A entry. He raced again at the 21st All-American, being dropped in the first round. The racer (pictured) is suspended above the restaurant floor. | On exhibit | |
| Boone County Museum of History | Belvidere | Illinois | 2025 | Has two cars on exhibit piloted in 1963 by Dale Drake and Allen Graves. Drake won runner-up the year prior in Belvidere, as well as receiving the best-engineered award for his car. | On exhibit | |
| Cafe Moto | San Diego | California | 2019 | A coffee house that has numerous Derby kit cars on display on the walls and ceiling | On display | |
| Canadian Automotive Museum | Oshawa | Ontario | Current | Has an orange Derby racer on exhibit that won the 1952 Kinsmen Coaster Classic in Montreal, Quebec, piloted by Bob Jackson of Oshawa. | On display | |
| Cape Fear Museum of History and Science | Wilmington | North Carolina | Current | Has a class A racer in its collection being prepared for display at a new facility in downtown Wilmington, expected to open in July 2026. | Will be on display | |
| Carillon Historical Park | Dayton | Ohio | 2022 | Has two Derby cars on display in the "Toys Manufactured in Dayton, Ohio" exhibit of the Heritage Center of Dayton Manufacturing & Entrepreneurship in Carillon Park. The first is a racer suspended from the ceiling once piloted by Donald Doerfert, who placed third in Dayton in 1934 and won the Best Constructed trophy. The second is a blue racer (illustration pictured) piloted by Cuyahoga Falls, Ohio entrant Dave Welty. Competing from 1946 until 1951, Welty made it to the third round of the Beacon Journal-sponsored local race in Akron, Ohio in 1949. | On exhibit | |
| Catawba County Museum of History | Newton | North Carolina | 2024 | The museum hosted an exhibit (pictured) titled A Race To Remember: Catawba County's Soap Box Derby (1967–1972), which opened on March 9, 2024. It featured six Derby cars of local champions from those dates. A film by Richard Eller, which features interviews of Hickory Derby director John Vaughn, as well as past racers, was shown on the opening day, along with sales of a book titled Down the Hill – A Race to Remember that Eller compiled directly from transcripts of those interviews. | Was on exhibit | |
| Catawba County Museum of History | Newton | North Carolina | 2024 | The exhibit included cars piloted by the following Champs: Mark Steven Cockerham winning in 1968, Mike Bolch in 1969, Keith Whitener in 1970, Keith Throneburg (pictured) in 1971, and Buster Carpenter in 1972. Rounding out the six was Andy Killian, who took 2nd in 1972. The exhibit ran through the summer. | Was on exhibit | |
| Catawba County Museum of History | Newton | North Carolina | 2024 | Mike Bolch's 1969 car (pictured) has already been on display at the museum as early as 2018. | Collection | |
| Clark County Historical Society | Springfield | Ohio | 2020 | Has in its collection a black Derby racer (illustration pictured) piloted by 1951 Springfield, Ohio Champion Lawrence Nicholl, 12. The car is on exhibit at the Clark County Heritage Center in Springfield. | On exhibit | |
| Clark County Museum | Henderson | Nevada | Current | On loan from the Nevada State Museum (see below) is a Derby racer piloted by Richard Paul Williams, who won the Las Vegas, Nevada Championship in 1958. The exhibit includes Richard's car, a local trophy, helmet and jacket. | On exhibit | |
| Clarksburg History Museum | Clarksburg | West Virginia | 2024 | One of the new exhibits at the Clarksburg museum that was put on display in 2024 featured Soap Box Derby racers, including a red car from the 1950s. | Was on exhibit | |
| Clinton County Historical Museum at Paine-Gillam-Scott House | St. Johns | Michigan | Current | Received a Derby car (illustration pictured) donated by Kris Patterson, winner of the St. Johns Championship in 1968. | Collection | |
| Codington County Heritage Museum | Watertown | South Dakota | Current | Has at least two cars, including one piloted by 1968 Watertown Champion Randall Kent Brandriet. | Collection | |
| Cole Land Transportation Museum | Bangor | Maine | Current | Has three Derby cars suspended high above the exhibit floor, including those piloted by 1950 local champion James Roy (his car pictured), and 1957 champ Robert S. Briggs. | On exhibit | |
| Colorado Springs Pioneers Museum | Colorado Springs | Colorado | Current | Has an interactive exhibit titled Story of Us: Explore the History and Geography of the Pikes Peak Region, which features a Derby car piloted by 1947 local entry Al Bates. | On exhibit | |
| Columbus Museum | Columbus | Georgia | Current | Opening in May 2026 is Columbus At Play, a year-long exhibit that includes a yellow, Senior Division Derby racer piloted by 1981 local Champion Bobby Lehman. The exhibit runs until March 2027. | On exhibit | |
| Connecticut Science Center | Hartford | Connecticut | 2009 | Has a racer piloted by 1999 World Rally Super Stock Champion Carleigh LeBlanc as part of the center's Sights & Sounds exhibit. | Was on exhibit | |
| Corinth Maine Historical Society | Corinth | Maine | Current | Is hosting an exhibit that features two racers from Corinth that competed in the 1948 Bangor, Maine local Derby race, piloted by Delwin and Gareth Blackwell. | On exhibit | |
| Crawford Auto-Aviation Museum | Cleveland | Ohio | 2026 | Has three racers, including two that were on exhibit in a show titled Off the Rack: Hidden Treasures From the Crawford. They were a black car piloted by 1946 Cleveland, Ohio Champion Richard Zoller, who took runner-up at the 9th All-American World Championship, and a blue lay-down car (illustration pictured) piloted by Margaret Mary "Peggy" Zoller, who won the Cleveland Championship in 1973 and placed 6th at the All-American. | In collection | |
| Darlington County Historical Commission | Darlington | South Carolina | Current | The Darlington County Museum, which opened in 2018 as the commission's exhibition venue, has two Derby cars on display. They comprise a racer piloted by 1951 local Champion Tommy Jordan, who donated it in 2018, and a laydown entry from the 1970s on loan from its driver Allan King, who hailed from nearby Hartsville, South Carolina. | On exhibit | |
| Deer Park Winery and Auto Museum | Escondido | California | 2021 | Has three unidentified Derby cars from different decades on display side-by-side on an incline ramp situated above the exhibit floor. | On exhibit | |
| DFW Car and Toy Museum | Fort Worth | Texas | 2025 | A collection of Derby trophies and memorabilia was donated to the museum, including a racer piloted by 1950 Springfield, OH Champion David F. Corbin, and put on display. | On exhibit | |
| Deming Luna Mimbers Museum | Deming | New Mexico | 2022 | Has two unidentified Derby cars from different decades on display, including a Jack Kennedy Ford-sponsored, class A entry from the 1960s. | On exhibit | |
| Depew House | Orangeburg | New York | 2024 | On June 9, 2024, the Orangetown Historical Museum & Archives hosted a talk titled Away We Go! at Depew House, the exhibition venue used by the Museum. The talk, celebrating the history of the Soap Box Derby in that region, was accompanied by Derby-related artifacts, including a blue 1960s Derby car on display. | Was on exhibit | |
| Detroit News Building | Detroit | Michigan | 1964–2014 | Home of the Detroit News newspaper from 1917 to 2014, housed in its reference center a Derby car (illustration pictured) piloted by 1964 Suburban Detroit Champion Patrick Shorkey. By October 2014 it was one of the last remnants remaining at the property while the newspaper was relocating to a new facility. | Unknown | |
| DieWerkhalle | Rüsselsheim | Germany | 2023 | Opel, a major sponsor of the German Soap Box Derby from 1950 to 1971, hosted a pop-up event at DieWerkhalle, an exhibition venue, that celebrated the 186th birthday of Opel founder Adam Opel. Under the motto Opel—Tradition Meets Future, the exhibit featured numerous artifacts from Opel's 150-year history, including a restored Derby racer piloted by 1957 local Champion Heinrich Walter. | Was on exhibit | |
| Don Garlits Museum of Drag Racing | Ocala | Florida | Current | Visible from the I-75 in Ocala, Florida, the Museum is a drag racing and motorsports-dedicated facility of vintage cars. It includes three Derby cars (pictured) from the 1990s, comprising two Stock Division entries and one Masters Division entry piloted by 1996 Central Florida Masters Champion Ashlee Gravett. Gravett is the granddaughter of 1933 Dayton, Ohio soap box entrant and 2000 All-American Soap Box Derby Hall of Fame inductee Robert Gravett, whose Old #7 car was used on Derby's official logo from 1934 until the late 60s. | On exhibit | |
| Don Laughlin's Classic Car Museum | Laughlin | Nevada | Current | Has in its collection of vintage automobiles a Derby car piloted by 1971 Las Vegas, NV Champion Terry Steve Leisek. | On exhibit | |
| Douglas F. Cooley Memorial Art Gallery | Portland | Oregon | 2018 | Hosted an exhibit by Brooklyn-based artist, activist and professor Gregg Bordowitz, titled I Wanna Be Well, an art installation on the AIDs pandemic continuing to exist worldwide. The exhibit included a piece titled Drive 2, which was a lay-down Derby car of unknown origin covered in vinyl stickers. After the 2018 exhibit, it opened again in 2021 at MoMA PS1, a contemporary art institution located in New York (Queens), with the same Derby car. | Was on exhibit | |
| DuBois Area Historical Society | DuBois | Pennsylvania | 2024 | Hosted in concert with The Courier Express is a series of exhibits titled Turn Back the Clock, which in April 2024 featured a Derby car (illustration pictured) piloted by 1950 DuBois Champion James M. Shaffer, on display at the E. D. Reitz Museum in DuBois. | Was on exhibit | |
| Duisburg Museum of Cultural and Urban History | Duisburg | Germany | 2013–14 | Hosted an exhibit titled 3, 2, 1 ... Start! about the history of the Soap Box Derby in that region from 1952 to 1971. Opening June 2013 and running until January 2014, the exhibit included artifacts, tours and talks by various speakers that raced and/or participated. | Was on exhibit | |
| Eastern Museum of Motor Racing (EMMR) | York Springs | Pennsylvania | 2015 | Has multiple Derby cars on exhibit, including examples piloted by 1940 Harrisburg, Pennsylvania Champion Jack Finney, 1970 York County, Pennsylvania Champion Mark E. Ilgenfritz (illustration of car pictured), and 1980 York, Pennsylvania Champion Chris Thorn. | On exhibit | |
| Edge Motor Museum | Memphis | Tennessee | Current | Has a Derby exhibit that features a car built and donated by Leslie Dale, who was the class B champ in Nashville, Tennessee in 1940. | On exhibit | |
| Eisenhower Conference Center | Gettysburg | Pennsylvania | 2017 | Hosted an auction of historic wax figures on May 13, 2017, which included a Derby car piloted by 1980 Montgomery, Alabama Senior Champion Allen Young. | Was on exhibit | |
| Elkhorn Valley Museum | Norfolk (Note: Johnny Carson, who hails from Norfolk, entered the Derby and built a racer at age-13.) | Nebraska | 2022 | Has a red Derby car from the mid- to late-seventies. | On exhibit | |
| Ellwood City Area Historical Society | Ellwood City | Pennsylvania | Current | Has on permanent display a Derby car (illustration pictured) piloted by 1959 Ellwood Champion Eddie Berendt (1945—2024). Exhibited in 2019 was the Bernard "Bucky" Kline miniature collection of Ellwood Champions from 1936 to 1962, of which Berendt's car is replicated. | On exhibit | |
| End of the Commons General Store | Mesopotamia | Ohio | Current | Has on permanent display two Derby cars, including one (illustration pictured) piloted by 1960 Warren, OH Champion Allen Frantz, who donated it in 2015. | On exhibit | |
| End of the Commons General Store | Mesopotamia | Ohio | Current | 1961 Warren, OH entry James Chadwick (pictured), located above the retail floor alongside other memorabilia | On exhibit | |
| Florence County Museum | Florence | South Carolina | 2016 | Hosted an exhibit highlighting the history of the annual Soap Box Derby race that took place in Florence during the 1960s and 1970s. | Was on exhibit | |
| Floyd County Historical Museum | Charles City | Iowa | 2019 | Has a local entry (illustration pictured) piloted by Rick Justus, who won the Mason City, Iowa class B title in 1960. | On exhibit | |
| Frankenmuth Historical Association | Frankenmuth | Michigan | Current | Has a racer from 1968 Saginaw, Michigan Champ Marcus Haubenstricker. The car is not on public display. | Collection only | |
| Franklin County 1910's Garage Museum | Benton | Illinois | 2022 | Has a single Derby car, named "Rythm Ride," on exhibit on the showroom floor. | On exhibit | |
| Fredericksburg Area Museum & Cultural Center | Fredericksburg | Virginia | Current | Hosted an exhibit from June 16 to August 31, 2012, titled Thrill on the Hill, featuring a car (illustration pictured) piloted by 1959 Fredericksburg Champion Boyd E. Blevins. As of 2021 the car continues to be on exhibit. | On exhibit | |
| Fredericksburg Area Museum & Cultural Center | Fredericksburg | Virginia | Current | In 2025 a Soap Box Derby exhibit went on display featuring a Farmers Creamery-sponsored car (illustration pictured) piloted by William R. "Billy" Campbell, a class A entrant in the Free Lance-Star Fredericksburg local race in 1961. | On exhibit | |
| The Garage Automotive Museum | Salina | Kansas | 2022 | Officially named The Salina Educational Automotive Museum of America, The Garage is a large, quarterly rotating exhibition venue featuring automobiles and automotive-themed items, including several Derby cars that were put on display from September to December 2022. | Was on exhibit | |
| Gardner Museum | Gardner | Massachusetts | Current | Has a single racer piloted in 1938 by All-American third-placer Stanford Hartshorn. | On exhibit | |
| Geary County Historical Society | Junction City | Kansas | Current | Has a single racer piloted in 1963 by Junction City, Kansas Champion Dana Wolf that was exhibited in 2013 and is now kept in their archive. | In collection | |
| Gilmore Car Museum | Hickory Corners | Michigan | 2023 | Has three Derby cars from the region exhibited on the showroom floor, each from a different decade, and another suspended from the ceiling piloted by 1962 Kalamazoo, Michigan Champion Alan Richard Dean. | On exhibit | |
| Giuseppe's Steel City Pizza | Port Orange | Florida | 2022 | Has among its extensive memorabilia décor a red, Pepsi Cola-sponsored Derby car from the 1960s hung on the wall. | On exhibit | |
| Governor Motor Company | Jefferson City | Missouri | 2019 | Has a single racer (pictured) piloted by 1970 Southwest Suburban, Illinois Champion Mark T. Ahlgrim. | On exhibit | |
| Greater Southwest Historical Museum | Ardmore | Oklahoma | Current | Has two examples on display, including a 1970/71 racer piloted by Alan Sharp. | On exhibit | |
| Greensboro History Museum | Greensboro | North Carolina | Current | Is hosting an exhibit titled GHM100: Treasures. Legacies. Remix that includes a Derby racer (illustration pictured) from the Museum's collection piloted by 1959 Greensboro Champion Joe Harmon. The exhibit lasts until Spring 2027. | On exhibit | |
| Greenwood Antiques | Greenwood | Virginia | Current | Has an unrestored car (illustration pictured) piloted by 1965 Charlottesville, Virginia Champion Donald Reid Jr. on the front veranda of the store. | On exhibit | |
| Hartley Nature Center | Duluth | Minnesota | Current | Once the site of Duluth's Soap Box Derby track, the center has a car (illustration pictured) piloted by 1964 Duluth Champion Dale Mell to honor that legacy. | On exhibit | |
| Haus der Geschichte | Bonn | Germany | Current | Opened on December 8, 2025 is an exhibit titled You Are Part of History: Germany since 1945 that marks the first major renovation of the museum since its opening in 1994. In it is a Derby racer (illustration pictured) piloted by 1952 German Champion Peter Kalinowski. | On exhibit | |
| Hattiesburg Area Historical Society | Hattiesburg | Mississippi | Current | Has a racer piloted in 1971 by Hattiesburg, Mississippi entrant Steve Mozingo. | On exhibit | |
| Heinz History Center | Pittsburgh | Pennsylvania | 2024 | Hosted an exhibit from March 22 to October 6, 2024, titled A Woman’s Place: How Women Shaped Pittsburgh, which included a Soap Box Derby display that featured a car piloted by 1982 Western Pennsylvania Senior Champion Jessica Clark. | Was on exhibit | |
| Hennepin History Museum | Minneapolis | Minnesota | Current | Has a racer piloted by 1959 Minneapolis Champion Jerald Edward Houk. | Collection | |
| The Henry Ford Museum | Dearborn | Michigan | Current | Showcases 1939 North Platte, NE Champion Mason Colbert's racer (illustration pictured). | On exhibit | |
| Hessenpark | Neu-Anspach | Germany | 2025 | Is hosting at Stallscheune aus Asterode, an exhibition venue in Hessenpark, a show titled Toys. Is It All Just a Game? that features numerous children's toys from 1900 to the present day. Among the artifacts are German Soap Box Derby items, including a restored Derby car from the 1950s. | On exhibit | |
| High Point Museum | High Point | North Carolina | 2023 | Hosted from February to March 2023 a Derby-themed exhibit featuring photographs of past participants, memorabilia and a single racer (pictured) driven by 1953 High Point, North Carolina racer Henry Clyde Williams Jr. (1937–2022). A panel discussion and question period was also held on the last Saturday of the exhibit. Invited to speak were Harrison "Bud" Lyon of Durham, the first African-American youth to win High Point's Derby in 1954; Bill Blair Jr., who participated in High Point's first Soap Box Derby in 1951; (Note: Blair's family has a long history of racing in High Point and beyond. His father, Bill Blair Sr., was one of the pioneers of NASCAR) and Gail Simpson, one of the first girls to race and the first to win High Point's Derby in 1972. Ms. Simpson was unable to speak due to an illness. | Was on exhibit | |
| Historical Auto Attractions | Roscoe | Illinois | 2025 | Has a red sit-up Derby racer piloted by Bob Schmidt, who competed in 1954 and 1955 in Springfield, Illinois. Along with the car are Derby artifacts like helmets, a trophy and Official Derby literature. | On exhibit | |
| Historical and Genealogical Society of Indiana County | Indiana | Pennsylvania | 2022 | Has in its collection a Derby car (illustration pictured) donated in 2002 by owner and 1957 Indiana, Pennsylvania Champion Kennard Fairman. The car was exhibited in 2022, along with trophies for his Championship win in Indiana and his Best-Design award at the 20th All-American World Championship in Akron later that summer. | In collection | |
| Historical Society of the Cocalico Valley | Ephrata | Pennsylvania | Current | Has on exhibit a racer piloted by Mike Ocker, who took the class B runner-up and 4th overall in Reading, Pennsylvania in 1969. | On exhibit | |
| Historic Richmond Town | Staten Island | New York | Current | Has a Derby car in its collection that was piloted in 1961 by Staten Island resident William Dubovsky. Dubbed "Zephyr III," the red class A car was donated in 2004 by Mr. Dubovsky and was featured as May Object of the Month. | In collection | |
| The History Center in Tompkins County | Ithaca | New York | 2020 | Had on exhibit a racer piloted by 1970 Ithaca, New York entry Robert Neigh. | Was on exhibit | |
| Hitzacker Museum | Hitzacker | Germany | 2025 | Is hosting a Derby exhibit of two cars that raced in the region, including an early–seventies laydown entry piloted by Björn Briese. Accompanying the cars are documents and photos, as well as a 1950s film-viewing in November, encompassing the history of the sport in Hitzacker. | On exhibit | |
| Hi-Way Diner Lincoln | Lincoln | Nebraska | 2024 | Has on display a Derby car (illustration pictured) piloted by 1972 Claremont, New Hampshire Champion Mike Wise. The car is suspended upside-down from the ceiling. | On exhibit | |
| Ice House Museum | Cedar Falls | Iowa | Current | The Cedar Falls Historical Society exhibits artifacts from its collection at the Ice House Museum, a former ice house servicing the City of Cedar Falls. Part of that collection are three Derby cars from the region, a black racer piloted by 1954 Cedar Falls Champion John Thode, a blue 1977/78 Junior Division entry by Terri Jerke, and a yellow 1978/79 Junior entry by Terri's younger brother Mike. As recent as 2018 they were also on exhibit. | In collection | |
| Indianapolis Motor Speedway Museum | Indianapolis | Indiana | Current | Accepted a car (illustration pictured) piloted by 1954 Hartford, Connecticut Soap Box Derby Champion Denny Zimmerman, (Note: Racing as an adult, Zimmerman was awarded Indy Rookie of the Year in 1971 and, as of 2011, is the only All-American Soap Box Derby participant to compete at the Indianapolis 500.) who donated it in 2007. | Collection | |
| Indiana State Museum | Indianapolis | Indiana | Current | Has on exhibit in its Global Indiana gallery a Derby car piloted by 1971 Lawrenceburg, Indiana Champion Kendall Jay Meyer. | Collection | |
| International Motorsports Hall of Fame | Talladega | Alabama | 2022 | Has two Derby cars on exhibit, a 1960s entry from Birmingham, Alabama piloted by Matt Wright, and a second by two-time (1997 and 1998) Birmingham, Alabama National Derby Rally (NDR) Masters Champion Will Waldrip. | On exhibit | |
| Isett Heritage Museum | Huntingdon | Pennsylvania | Current | Has three Derby racers from different generations on exhibit, including a car piloted by 1958 Ellwood City, Pennsylvania entry Chuck Maggi, a kit-car by 1987 State College, Pennsylvania Junior Division Champion Karen Maggi and a laydown by 1990 Central Pennsylvania Masters Division Champion Pamela Maggi. | On exhibit | |
| James Madison Museum | Orange | Virginia | Current | Has a single Derby car piloted by Johnny Altman, who raced in Orange and won the Best Constructed Award in 1960. Mr. Altman donated the car in 2013. | On exhibit | |
| Jacksonville Area Museum | Jacksonville | Illinois | Current | Has on display a Derby car piloted by Bruce Samoore, winner of the 1946 Jacksonville local race. | On exhibit | |
| Jeff Matthews Memorial Museum | Galax | Virginia | 2024 | This historical artifact museum celebrating Galax's pre- and post-colonial heritage has on exhibit a locally sponsored Derby racer accompanied by an official 1952 Derby helmet sitting atop the car. | On exhibit | |
| Johnson County Museum | Overland Park | Kansas | 2022 | Has a racer piloted by 1967 Kansas City, Missouri Champion Dennis Mullen. | On exhibit | |
| Kalamazoo Valley Museum | Kalamazoo | Michigan | Current | Has a racer (illustration pictured) piloted by Edward L. Cherkoian, 14, who won the Kalamazoo, Michigan local Championship in 1959 and competed at the 22nd All-American Nationals in Akron, Ohio a month later. It is exhibited in the Atrium of Artifacts on the top level. | On exhibit | |
| Kansas Historical Society | Topeka | Kansas | 2024 | Has a racer in its collection that was piloted but Russell Dille, who took sixth place in the local Topeka Derby race in 1973. Included with the car is related memorabilia like Dille's helmet and photos of him constructing the car. As recent a 2022 the car was on exhibit at the Kansas Museum of History in Topeka. | In collection | |
| Kassel Museum | Kassel | Germany | 2020–2021 | Hosted an exhibit entitled "Es Lebe der Sport", which featured a racer (illustration pictured) piloted by 1957 Kassel, Germany Soap Box Derby Champion Ernst Krönert. | Was on exhibit | |
| Kentucky Historical Society | Frankfort | Kentucky | Current | Has in its collection a Derby car piloted by Lisa Luthy who won the Northern Kentucky local championship in 1975 and raced in National Championship in Akron, Ohio a month later. Another car raced by Luthy in 1972 is on exhibit at the Behringer-Crawford Museum in Covington, Kentucky (see above). | In collection | |
| Kingsport Archives | Kingsport | Tennessee | 2024 | Located on the 5th floor of the Kingsport City Hall building, the Kingsport Archives celebrated its 30th anniversary by hosting an open house on 3 October 2024 titled 30 Days of 30 Facts. On display from its collection was a Derby racer piloted by 1970 Kingsport Champion Wayne D. Eldreth. Also in its collection is a racer (illustration pictured) piloted by 1965 Kingsport, Tennessee class A entrant George Collins that he donated in 2004. | In collection | |
| Kosciusko County Historical Society | Warsaw | Indiana | 2014 | Exhibited at their 49th annual banquet was a Derby racer piloted in 1955 and 1956 by Larry Shively. Held at the Zimmer Biomet Center Lake Pavilion in Warsaw, speakers also included fellow racer Tom Plew, who came second at the local championship in 1957. | Was on exhibit | |
| Kossuth County Agricultural and Motorsports Museum | Algona | Iowa | Current | Has three Derby cars on the second level of the museum. They include a metal sit-up racer piloted by Darrell Ludwig, who took the Best-Constructed Car Award in the Algona, Iowa local race in 1950. Alongside is a car (illustration pictured) piloted by Jackie Lichter (1933–2025), who won the 1946 class B division in Algona and class B runner-up at the Iowa State Championship in Des Moines. A publicity stunt prior to that race saw Bob Hope sitting astride his car. Lichter raced again in 1947, winning the class A division trophy in Algona. His car in the museum is restored to 1947 livery. A third car in the museum is unidentified. | On exhibit | |
| Lakeshore Museum | Muskegon | Michigan | 2026 | Has a car and related photos donated by original owner Kim Eggeman, who raced in the Muskegon local Derby in 1968. | In collection | |
| Lancaster Soap Box Derby Hall of Fame Museum | Lancaster | Ohio | Current | The Lancaster Soap Box Derby Hall of Fame Museum, the only Derby-dedicated museum of its kind when it opened in 1976, has a large collection (pictured) of their local champ cars on display at their topside building. Some of their earliest entries, all sit-ups, include those piloted by Scott Straley in 1956—their oldest car, Jerry Campbell in 1957, Don McCellan in 1958, Dick Kraner in 1959, Larry Wilkins in 1960, Larry McCoy in 1961, Ben McCoy in 1963, Jeff Engel in 1964, David Beach in 1966 (illustration pictured below), Rick Wilkins in 1967, Jim Hunt in 1969 and David Brenstuhl in 1970. Early lay-down models include Ray Blair in 1971, Pike Hull in 1972, Bill Hunt in 1973, Brian Hunt in 1974 (pictured below), Mike Roth in 1975, Ken Hoffman in 1976, Lisa Spires in 1977 and Lori Roth in 1978. | On exhibit | |
| Lancaster Soap Box Derby Hall of Fame Museum | Lancaster | Ohio | Current | 1966 Lancaster, Ohio Champion David Beach's car (illustration pictured) | On exhibit | |
| Lancaster Soap Box Derby Hall of Fame Museum | Lancaster | Ohio | Current | 1974 Lancaster, Ohio Champion Brian Hunt's car (pictured) on exhibit at the 2nd Annual Vintage Derby Car Show in 2023 | On exhibit | |
| Larz Anderson Auto Museum | Brookline | Massachusetts | 2019 | Has suspended from the wall a black Derby racer piloted in 1949 by Ronald Meletzke from Cleveland, Ohio, and a 1953 helmet hung alongside. | On exhibit | |
| Lauderdale County Archives | Meridian | Mississippi | Current | The Lauderdale County Department of Archives & History Inc. acquired in 2025 a Derby car that was donated by its original owner, 1963 Meridian, Mississippi Champion W. L. Landrum. | In collection | |
| The LeMay – America's Car Museum | Tacoma | Washington | 2024 | Has two examples, including a car piloted by 1967 Tacoma, Washington Champion Richard R. Peterson, and 1972 Seattle, Washington Champion Mark Spencer Chamberlain. | On exhibit | |
| Leavenworth County Historical Society | Leavenworth | Kansas | Current | On loan from the collection of the Leavenworth County Historical Society is a Derby car on exhibit at MainStreet Chrysler Dodge Jeep RAM in Lansing, Kansas. The car was piloted by Leavenworth resident John Joseph Blume, a class B entrant that raced in 1949 and 1950. | On exhibit | |
| Lorain County History Center | Elyria | Ohio | Current | Has a Derby racer in pristine condition that was piloted in 1967 by Amherst, Ohio Champion David W. Gard (1953–2006). Gard's children donated the car and its memorabilia in 2012, which has remained on exhibit by the main entrance ever since. | On exhibit | |
| Louwman Museum | The Hague | South Holland | Current | Has two unidentified Derby cars and a video of the sport alongside other full-sized racing automobiles | On exhibit | |
| Lynchburg Museum | Lynchburg | Virginia | 2016 | Exhibited three Derby cars in 2012 that competed in Lynchburg's local race. One of them on permanent display was piloted by Terrell Griffin, who competed from 1949 until 1951. | On exhibit | |
| Lynchburg Police Department HQ Museum | Lynchburg | Virginia | Current | The Lynchburg Police Foundation acquired for its future memorabilia museum a Derby racer (illustration pictured) donated by Claude and Martha Tuggle. Claude raced the car in 1951 when he was 14-years old. His sponsor was the LPD, where his father served as police sergeant on the force. | On exhibit | |
| The Magnolia Plantation Bed & Breakfast Inn | Gainesville | Florida | 2022 | Has a Derby car on the verandah of the inn, photographed and posted in a review dated September 2016. The red sit-up car, named "Spats" Hurricane, was raced by 1966 Ft. Pierce, Florida entrant Joey Montalto. | On exhibit | |
| Mattatuck Museum | Waterbury | Connecticut | 2023–2024 | Hosted from January 2023 to January 2024 a Derby-themed installation featuring pamphlets, photographs and a 1971 racer loaned by its owner, driver Stephen Longo. | Was on exhibit | |
| McHenry County Historical Society & Museum | Union | Illinois | 2007 | Has a class B car (illustration pictured) piloted by 11-year-old Peter Perkins, who was crowned Woodstock, Illinois local champion in 1952 in his first Derby attempt. He was runner-up in his first and only heat a month later at the All-American National in Akron, Ohio. Perkins is a life member of the museum. His car is not on exhibit at the moment. | In collection | |
| Memory Lane Museum | Mooresville | North Carolina | Current | Has numerous vintage Derby cars (pictured) in their collection. They include examples from Dan Parks of Charlotte, North Carolina, who finished his long career in 1965 as a class A; Neil Castles Jr., also of Charlotte, who took 6th place in the Senior Division of that local in 1985; and Mark Whitley of Winston-Salem, North Carolina, who competed at the All-American in 1990 in the Kit Division, winning his first heat. The following year he raced as a Senior at the All-American, taking 8th. | On exhibit | |
| Memory Lane Museum | Mooresville | North Carolina | Current | A white sit-up racer (pictured) piloted by Steve Matlock of Knoxville, TN, who competed from 1955 to 1958, taking 2nd in 1956 | On exhibit | |
| Memory Lane Museum | Mooresville | North Carolina | Current | A blue sit-up racer (pictured) piloted by Carson, Virginia entrant Freddie Shultz | On exhibit | |
| Menominee Heritage Museum | Menominee | Michigan | 2022 | Hosted in the Special Exhibit Room a collection of Derby racers from Menominee, including a Senior Division entry (illustration pictured) piloted by Kevin Tuma, who placed forth in the Green Bay, Wisconsin local race in 1980. | Was on exhibit | |
| Mike's Place | Kent | Ohio | Current | Among its numerous items of Americana on display, this restaurant has several Derby cars located above the dining room, including a black vintage racer (pictured) that won the Ravenna-Kent local championship in the 1940s or 1950s. | On exhibit | |
| Miller House Museum | Hagerstown | Maryland | Current | Curated by the Washington County Historical Society, which is headquartered at the Miller House Museum, is an exbibit of a restored Derby car (illustration pictured) piloted in 1939 by Hagerstown, Maryland Champion Lewis Spessard (1923–2018). The car was restored a month prior to its unveiling on March 1, 2025. | On exhibit | |
| Minnesota History Center | Saint Paul | Minnesota | Current | Has a Derby car piloted in 1938 by St. Paul, Minnesota Champion Herbert Garelic. (Note: 1938 St. Paul, Minnesota Champion Herbert Garelic founded Garelick Manufacturing Company, a marine accessories supplier.) | On exhibit | |
| Miracle of America Museum | Polson | Montana | Current | Has a Derby car (illustration pictured) in its collection that was piloted by 1946 Bay City, Michigan Champion Douglas Swisher. Racing in Flint, Michigan, Swisher was a class A competitor against other Bay City entrants for that community's top prize. | In collection | |
| Miriam P. Brenner Children's Museum | Greensboro | North Carolina | 2022 | Has three Derby cars from the 1970s suspended above the Volvo truck and Petty Enterprises Hot Wheels exhibits. They were all constructed and raced by Greensboro, North Carolina competitor Eddie Ross, who was runner-up finalist in 1973. | On exhibit | |
| Mission Museum | Mission | British Columbia | Current | Has at least four Derby cars that competed locally, including a yellow entry (illustration pictured) piloted by 1961 Mission City, British Columbia Champion Raymond Mack. | On exhibit | |
| Mission Museum | Mission | British Columbia | Current | A second example (pictured) piloted by 1969 Western Canada Champion Dennis Lissimore | On exhibit | |
| Monroe County History Center | Bloomington | Indiana | 2023 | Has on exbibit two examples, including a blue car from the 1950s piloted by an unidentified driver, and a second by Bloomington, Indiana entrant Gerry Patterson, who was runner-up in 1962. | On exhibit | |
| Morrison Motor Car Museum | Concord | North Carolina | Current | Has two cars (pictured) piloted by 1965 Charlotte, North Carolina Champion David Alexander, and 1966 Charlotte, North Carolina racer Mark Alexander on the showroom floor. | On exhibit | |
| Mount Airy Museum of Regional History | Mount Airy | North Carolina | Current | Celebrating the unveiling of Phase 3 and the new Business & Industry Gallery, an exhibit opened in May 2026 that features a Derby racer. Painted bright orange with the local sponsor Quality Mills on the side, the local class A entry was piloted by Hugh Edward Sutphin, 15, who competed in 1966 and was awarded the distinction of best-constructed car. | On exhibit | |
| Muscatine Art Center | Muscatine | Iowa | Current | Is hosting an exhibit titled Muscatine History Revisited from October 2024 to August 2025 that features a Derby car named The Melon Shed piloted in 1949 by Muscatine class B Champion Jim Hoopes. | On exhibit | |
| Museu da Casa Brasileira | São Paulo | Brazil | 2018 | Held an exhibit titled Design Aerodinâmico – Metáfora do Futuro (en. Aerodynamic Design – Metaphor for the Future), featuring a 1940s Derby car from Portsmouth, New Hampshire. | Was on exhibit | |
| Museum der Niederrheinischen Seele | Grevenbroich | Germany | 2021 | Housed at the Villa Erckens, the Museum added to their collection a yellow sit-up racer piloted by Georg Briese, who in 1985 competed at the first Derby race in Grevenbroich and in 2021 donated the car. | In collection | |
| Museum Im Stern | Warburg | Germany | 2024 | Following the 75th anniversary of Warburg October Week, a series of personal mementos connected to the festivities were put on display from late-October to mid-November 2024, including at the Museum a Derby car piloted by 1968 Warburg Champion Klaus Braun. | Was on exhibit | |
| Museum of American Speed | Lincoln | Nebraska | Current | Has numerous Derby cars on exhibit, including examples piloted by 1934 Indianapolis, Indiana Champion Raymond A. Kern, 1949–51 Muncie, Indiana class B racer Garland Ross Jr. (illustration pictured), 1962 Detroit, MI Champion Robert Joseph Hanlon, as well as 1969 entries from Mark Larivee of Detroit and local Steve Fralin of Lincoln. | On exhibit | |
| Museum of American Speed | Lincoln | Nebraska | Current | Also on exhibit is a soap box racer (illustration pictured) piloted by Henry Yacek, who competed in the inaugural Naugatuck, Connecticut Coasting Derby, an un-registered Soap Box Derby event in 1948, receiving a plaque for best designed car. It was donated by Henry and Irene Yacek. | On exhibit | |
| National Automotive and Truck Museum | Auburn | Indiana | Current | Home of GM Futurliner#10, the National Automotive and Truck Museum has on display numerous Derby cars (pictured) from various decades and race divisions, including a blue class B entry from the 1960s. | On exhibit | |
| National Automotive and Truck Museum | Auburn | Indiana | Current | A racer piloted by Orville Johnson, 12, a class B entry who won the Watertown, South Dakota local race in 1953. He competed at the 16th All-American in Akron, being dropped in the first round. | On exhibit | |
| National Automotive and Truck Museum | Auburn | Indiana | Current | A racer piloted by Phil Page, who competed in the Fort Wayne, Indiana local race in 1971 | On exhibit | |
| National Automotive and Truck Museum | Auburn | Indiana | Current | A Senior Division racer piloted by Laura Gerardot, who won the Fort Wayne, Indiana local race in 1982. At the 45th All-American, she advanced to the second round. Her Junior Division winning racer from 1979 is also on exhibit. | On exhibit | |
| National Museum of American History | Washington | D.C. | Current | Has several Derby items, including two racers and a helmet. One racer (illustration pictured) was piloted by 1961 Hartford, Connecticut Champion Robert J. Pusateri, and the second by 1994 National Derby Rally Stock Division Champion Laura Shepherd (Note: Laura Shepherd won Rookie of the Year in 1994. In 1995 she placed 4th at the All-American, then clinched her second National Derby Rally Championship, this time in the Kit-Car Division a week later. Called "Lightening Laura," the Stock Division car was inducted in 1997.) from Kent, Ohio. The cars are not on public display. The helmet in the collection was worn by Derby's first female World Champion Karren Stead, who won in 1975. | Collection only | |
| National Museum of Ireland | Castlebar | County Mayo, Ireland | Current | Celebrating the 70th anniversary of the Soap Box Derby in Ireland, the National Museum of Ireland is hosting a temporary exhibit titled Soapbox dreams in 1950s Ireland, which includes a car piloted in 1956 by Westport, County Mayo entrant Joseph Moran. The car was donated recently to the Irish Folklife Collection. | On exhibit | |
| Nevada State Museum | Las Vegas | Nevada | 2019–2020 | The Nevada State Museum conducted an exhibit hosted at the Las Vegas Springs Preserve titled Eclectic Nevada, which included a Derby car piloted by 1958 Las Vegas, Nevada Champion Richard Paul Williams. | Was on exhibit | |
| New England Racing Museum | Loudon | New Hampshire | 2021 | Has three Derby cars hung on a wall display, including one piloted by 1982 Junior World Champion Carol Ann Sullivan. 1954 Hartford, Connecticut Champion Denny Zimmermans's car (illustration pictured) was on exhibit there in 2021, on loan from the Indianapolis Motor Speedway Museum. | On exhibit | |
| New York State Museum | Albany | New York | 2018 | Hosted in 2010 an exhibition titled Derby Doings: The All-American Soap Box Derby, which celebrated the history of the sport and specifically Albany's participation in it, with its first competition held in 1940. Featured were two local Derby cars, one built by 1949 entry Richard Russell and a Super-Stock entry piloted by Michael Morawski, who raced in 2007. In 2018 the museum acquired a car (illustration pictured) piloted by 1971 Albany, New York Champion Randy Hood, along with his race jacket and trophy. | In collection | |
| North Carolina Museum of History | Raleigh | North Carolina | Current | Has a single racer (illustration pictured) in their collection, piloted by 1972 Chapel Hill, North Carolina Champion Priscilla Freeman, who took fifth place at the 35th All-American. The car is currently not on public display. | Collection only | |
| Northwest Connecticut Fire Fighting Museum | Torrington | Connecticut | 2022 | Situated at the Bad Dog Brewing Company in Torrington, has two Derby car as floor exhibits, both sponsored by the Torrington Fire Department, including an example piloted by Tommy Petrovits, who was entered to compete in the third annual local race in Torrington on 1960. | On exhibit | |
| Oakland Museum of California | Oakland | California | 2010–11 | Hosted an exhibit by artist Mark Dion titled The Marvelous Museum, that featured overlooked "orphans, curiosities, and treasures" seldom displayed nor borrowed by other museums. In it a Derby car (illustration pictured) from pre-1948 (Note: According to the Official Rules Books of the All-American Soap Box Derby, cars built before 1948 were permitted the use of wind-screens, which the exhibit car had.) was included, and was like many of the items in the exhibit presented in its storage crate. The car was gifted to the Museum by Bill Jolliffe, who is credited as its maker. | Was on exhibit | |
| Ohio History Center | Columbus | Ohio | 2022 | Has a Derby car on display piloted by 1949 Akron, Ohio 3rd-placer Carl William "Bill" Ford. | On exhibit | |
| Okoboji Classic Cars | Milford | Iowa | 2020 | Has three Derby cars on display, including one (illustration pictured) from 1966 Sioux City, Iowa Champion Roger Lee Van Waart. | On exhibit | |
| Old Courthouse Museum | Sioux Falls | South Dakota | 2024 | Has two cars in a Derby exhibit, including 1970 Sioux Falls, South Dakota entry Evan Jones and 1971 Sioux Falls Champion Steve Peterson. | On exhibit | |
| Old School Museum | Winchester | Illinois | 2022 | Has a Champion car from Clint Buckley who won the Jacksonville, Illinois, local race in 1972. | On exhibit | |
| Old State House Museum | Little Rock | Arkansas | Current | Has a racer (illustration pictured) piloted by 1960 Magnolia, Arkansas Champion Wallace F. Waits (1945–2023). The car is currently not on public display. | Collection only | |
| Olean Point Museum | Olean | New York | Current | Part of The Olean Historical & Preservation Society, Olean Point Museum has two sit-up Derby racers on exhibit that were piloted by brothers Dick and Gary Montgomery in the late 1950s. | On exhibit | |
| Osoyoos & District Museum and Archives | Osoyoos | British Columbia | Current | Has a small Soap Box Derby collection that includes an Official All-American racing jacket worn by 1960 Western Canada Champion Holger Huhn, a silver Derby racing helmet from 1962, and an unidentified green race car from the late-fifties or early-sixties. | On exhibit | |
| Owensboro Museum of Science and History | Owensboro | Kentucky | 2022 | Has a Soap Box Derby exhibit comprising three cars and related memorabilia on display. The cars include a black situp piloted by 1960 Owensboro Champion Larry Erwin, and a white kit-car piloted by 2001 Owensboro Super Stock Champion Ethan Henton. In Akron, Henton took 3rd at the 64th All-American. | On exhibit | |
| Owls Head Transportation Museum | Owls Head | Maine | Current | The museum has a wealth of Derby-related ephemera in its archives and several cars tucked away in storage, including 1938 Portland, Maine Champion Perley Bartlett. As recent as 2017, it along with two others were exhibited in the museum, including New Hampshire Senior Division Champion Carol Ann Sullivan (illustration pictured). | Collection | |
| Parsons Historical Society Museum | Parsons | Kansas | 2016 | Hosted an exhibit of Derby memorabilia that featured at least four cars, including examples piloted by 1949 local Champion William Schibi and 1950 local Champion Jerry Schibi. | May be on exhibit | |
| Peekskill Museum | Peekskill | New York | Current | Has a single example (pictured) upstairs in the Marion Boyle Children's Room, piloted by 1936 Peekskill, New York Champion William Barthelmes. | On exhibit | |
| Pennsylvania College of Technology | Williamsport | Pennsylvania | 2012 | Pennsylvania College of Technology, which opens its masonry laboratory annually for construction of cars used in the Williamsport Soap Box Derby, exhibited in 2012 a Derby car piloted by 1951 World Champion Darwin Cooper, who hails from there. The car was put on display at the entrance of the college's Madigan Library. | Was on exhibit | |
| Region of Waterloo Museums & Archives | Kitchener | Ontario | Current | Has in their collection a class B car (pictured) built in 1955 and raced in the area. The driver's name is withheld pending permission of the donor, who was original owner and builder of the car. It is currently not on public display. | Collection only | |
| Richardson County Historical Society | Falls City | Nebraska | Current | Had added their collection in 2023 two Derby cars from the late 1940s that were donated by their original owners. They were piloted by local racers Ward Reesman in 1948 and Ray Simon in 1949. | On exhibit | |
| Rock County Historical Society | Janesville | Wisconsin | 2021 | Housed at Lincoln-Tallman House in Janesville, and in the basement, are two cars in a Derby-themed exhibit piloted by 1948 Janesville, Wisconsin Champion Carliss H. Shuler (illustration pictured) and 1949 Janesville, Wisconsin Champion Gerald S. Wells. | On exhibit | |
| Rome Sports Hall of Fame | Rome | New York | Current | Has a black restored situp racer piloted by Paul Lucci, who competed in the Rome local Derby in 1954. | On exhibit | |
| Route 66 Motorheads Bar and Grill and Museum | Springfield | Illinois | 2019 | Situated above the restaurant bar is a Derby car piloted by 1972 Springfield, Illinois Champion Robert Wayne Wieks, along with other memorabilia like a flag and trophy connected to the car's history. Mr. Wieks had not seen the car since his win in 1972 until much later when it was put on display above the bar. Now back in his possession, the car remains on exhibit. | On exhibit | |
| Ruhr Museum | Essen | Germany | 2020 | Hosted an exhibit titled Childhood in the Ruhr Region, which included a Derby racer from Essen piloted by Hardy Hausberg in 1983. | Was on exhibit | |
| St. Catharines Museum & Welland Canals Centre | St. Catharines | Ontario | 2023 | Hosted a Derby-themed exhibit on the history of the Soap Box Derby in St. Catharines featuring photographs, trophies and related memorabilia. In it were two cars piloted by 1954 Champ Larry Tracey (illustration pictured), which is in the Museum's permanent collection, and 1972 Champ William Roy "Bill" Hand. | Was on exhibit | |
| St. Louis County Historical Society | Duluth | Minnesota | 2021 | Hosted an exhibit at the Fesler Gallery on 1963 Soap Box Derby World Champion Harold "Bo" Conrad, who hailed from Duluth, Minnesota. On display was a blue Derby car and videos, with trophies and memorabilia on loan from Mr. Conrad. The car he won in (illustration pictured) is on exhibit at the Soap Box Derby Hall of Fame Museum in Akron, Ohio | Was on exhibit | |
| San Diego Automotive Museum | Balboa Park | California | 2017 | Exhibited a Derby racer (illustration pictured) piloted by 1946 World Champion Gilbert Klecan, who loaned the car. | Was on exhibit | |
| Sanford Museum & Planetarium | Cherokee | Iowa | 2024 | Has hosted several Derby cars, including a Soap Box Derby exhibit that ran until March 18, 2024. They have included examples piloted by 1954 Sioux City, Iowa racer Martin Boothby, and 1971 Cherokee, Iowa Champion Jim Krueger. | Was on exhibit | |
| Saratoga Automobile Museum | Saratoga Springs | New York | 2017 | Has exhibited vintage racers piloted by Peter Voronovsky (illustration pictured) of Schenectady, New York, who was awarded the Best Constructed trophy in 1951, and Jordan Milner of Windsor, Connecticut, who competed as a Stock Division entry in 1995. | Was on exhibit | |
| Saratoga Automobile Museum | Saratoga Springs | New York | 2017 | Linda Lee Aidala was Albany, New York Senior Division Champion in her orange lay-down racer (illustration pictured) in 1981. | Was on exhibit | |
| Savoy Automobile Museum | Cartersville | Georgia | 2026—2027 | Is hosting a temporary exhibit titled Downhill Thrill, which features numerous All-American World Champion cars on display from November 10, 2026 to February 28, 2027. Dennis VanFossen, Jr., 2007 Super Stock Rally World Champion and current President & CEO of International Soap Box Derby, hosted a talk on November 14, 2026. | On exhibit | |
| Savoy Automobile Museum | Cartersville | Georgia | 2026—2027 | The exhibit comprises twenty-three vintage and modern Derby racers from 1934 to 2026, as well as eleven photographs and several historical artifacts. With the exception of two racers, all are on loan from the International Soap Box Derby. | On exhibit | |
| Savoy Automobile Museum | Cartersville | Georgia | 2026—2027 | Seen side-by-side are racers piloted by 1934 inaugural All-American World Champion Robert Turner and 2019 Masters World Champion Kelsey Van Waart. Kelsey was also Rally Super Stock World Champion in 2023. | On exhibit | |
| Seiverling Museum | Ephrata | Pennsylvania | 2023 | Seiverling Museum, a car and pedal car museum, entered a float at the 88th Ephrata Fair Parade, which featured a Derby car piloted by 1973 local Champion Brad Kreider, whose family members were volunteers. The parade took place on Main Street, the same thoroughfare on which Brad had won 50 years earlier. | Was on exhibit | |
| Silver Creek Museum | Freeport | Illinois | Current | Has a single example piloted by 1950–1951 Freeport, Illinois racer Dean G. Speilman. | On exhibit | |
| Simpson County Historical Society | Franklin | Kentucky | 2020 | Featured a Soap Box Derby exhibit in their window display, including a car piloted by 1963 Bowling Green, Kentucky Champion Jim Clouse and a second by Conleigh Wilson, who raced from 2014 until 2018 and then loaned the car to D.J. Kriser, who won the Franklin Junior Championship in 2019. | Was on exhibit | |
| Sioux City Public Museum | Sioux City | Iowa | Current | Has at least four cars, including a replica of 1937 Sioux City, Iowa Champion Wayne Johnson's "mushroom car", which he constructed in 2008 and donated to the museum, and 1967 Sioux City, Iowa Champion Mark Lehmann (1953–2017) (illustration of his car pictured), both suspended high above the museum floor. | On exhibit | |
| Sioux City Public Museum | Sioux City | Iowa | Current | In 2023 a show entitled New to You: Recent Artifact Donations exhibited recent acquisitions, including two Derby cars driven by 1970 Sioux City, Iowa Champion Stephen T. Lalley (illustration pictured) and 1990 Sioux City, Iowa Masters Champion Wendy Van Waart. | Exhibited in 2023 | |
| Sloan Museum of Discovery | Flint | Michigan | Current | Exhibited in the Durant Vehicle Gallery of the Sloan Museum in Flint, Michigan is a collection of Derby memorabilia commemorating Flint's involvement in the sport since 1938. Enclosed in display cases are two Derby cars, including a black sit-up entry (pictured) piloted by Flint Champion Steven A. Katz, who made it to the second round of the 23rd All-American World Championship in 1960, | On exhibit | |
| Sloan Museum of Discovery | Flint | Michigan | Current | A white laydown entry piloted by Flint Senior Division Champion Mark Smith, who tied for runner-up at the 44th All-American in 1981. | On exhibit | |
| Smoky Hill Museum | Salina | Kansas | 2021 | Has exhibited a Derby car piloted by 1967 Salina, Kansas Champion Jack Klein (1955–2004). | On exhibit | |
| Soap Box Derby Hall of Fame Museum | Akron | Ohio | Current | Home of the Soap Box Derby, the Hall of Fame Museum houses about half of the 140+ vehicles that won the All-American World Championship. They include a replica of Robert Gravett's Old #7 racer from 1933 used in the official logo, and 1947 World Champion Kenneth Holmboe (illustration of his car pictured). | On exhibit | |
| Soap Box Derby Hall of Fame Museum | Akron | Ohio | Current | 1952 World Champion Joe Lunn's racer (illustration pictured), dubbed "The Ramblin' Wreck from Georgia" | On exhibit | |
| Soap Box Derby Hall of Fame Museum | Akron | Ohio | Current | 1961 Colorado Springs, Colorado entrant Bob Carter's racer (pictured) was donated in 2012. | On exhibit | |
| Soap Box Derby Hall of Fame Museum | Akron | Ohio | Current | 1963 World Champion Harold Conrad's racer (illustration pictured) | On exhibit | |
| Soap Box Derby Hall of Fame Museum | Akron | Ohio | Current | Ken Cline's 1967 World Championship racer (illustration pictured), dubbed "the Grasshopper" | On exhibit | |
| Soap Box Derby Hall of Fame Museum | Akron | Ohio | Current | Soap Box Derby's first female All-American Champion Karren Stead's car (illustration pictured) is on exhibit at the Museum. The helmet she used is in the collection of the National Museum of American History. In 2025 her car was exhibited at the 4th Vintage Derby Car Show. | On exhibit | |
| Soap Box Derby Hall of Fame Museum | Akron | Ohio | Current | 1983 Senior World Champion Mike Burdgick's lay-down racer (illustration pictured) | On exhibit | |
| Soap Box Derby Hall of Fame Museum | Akron | Ohio | Current | 1992 Masters World Champion Bonnie Thornton's sit-up racer (illustration pictured) | On exhibit | |
| South Dakota State Historical Society | Pierre | South Dakota | Current | Has a Derby car (illustration pictured) in its collection that was piloted by 1941 Rapid City, South Dakota Champion Jack Enterman, 15. This is Enterman's second car, his first he raced the year prior, taking runner-up in the class A division and third overall. | Collection | |
| Stables Cafe | Guthrie | Oklahoma | 2026 | Has, as part of its extensive memorabilia decor, an unidentified lay-down racer from the 1970s suspended above the dining area. | On exhibit | |
| Stansbury Museum | Stansbury | South Australia | 2023 | Located on Gulf St Vincent across from Adelaide, South Australia, this local museum has a yellow 1970s, layback Derby car named Rusty's Racer on display. | On exhibit | |
| Stratford-Perth Archives | Straford | Ontario | 2019 | Displayed a derby car (illustration pictured) in 2019 dubbed "Miss Canada," which was raced in Stratford from 1951 to 1954 by brothers Gary and Marvin Thomas. The car is in the collection of the Stratford Perth Museum, who loaned the car. | Was on exhibit | |
| Strong National Museum of Play | Rochester | New York | Current | Has multiple examples in their collection, including cars piloted by 1951 Rochester, New York class A racer Richard E. "Dick" Zicari (1936–2011), donated by Mr. Zicari (illustration pictured), 1964 Rochester Champion William "Bucky" Lentzer, which has been on display as recent as 2026, and 1975 Rochester Champion Dave Marra, donated by Mr. Marra. | On exhibit | |
| Subsequence Magazine | Hiroshima | Japan | 2022–2023 | Subsequence Magazine, self-described as "an experimental media project," curated in 2022 and 2023 a pop-up gallery titled Subsequence SALON vol.2 My Archive that displayed a variety of arts and crafts, including an unidentified Derby car of 1970s layback design and laminate construction. | Was on exhibit | |
| Swift Current Museum | Swift Current | Saskatchewan | 2018 | Hosted a Derby exhibit in October 2018 that was pitched to the museum by the Swift Current Soapbox Racing Association, which at the time was celebrating 35 years of continuous racing. It featured several racers, including a senior lay-down car piloted by Aiden Jahnke. | Was on exhibit | |
| Syracuse Sports Hall of Fame | Syracuse | New York | Current | Has a single Derby car piloted by 1970 Syracuse Champion Walter G. Hadyk. | On exhibit | |
| Tallahassee Automobile Museum | Tallahassee | Florida | Current | Has three cars on exhibit, including examples from Roy Garren, who raced in the Senior Division in the DeKalb County, Georgia, race in 1984, and David Garren, who won the Junior Division Championship in Atlanta in 1985. | On exhibit | |
| Tallmadge Historical Society | Tallmadge | Ohio | Current | Has a 1976 Junior (the inaugural year for the Junior Division) racer (illustration pictured) that was piloted by Suzanne Miller, who won the Flint, MI Fall Rally Jr. Championship that year. Suzanne hailed from Tallmadge, Ohio, where the first Soap Box Derby race was held, down Tallmadge Hill, in Akron, Ohio in 1934. In 2022 her car was exhibited at the Inaugural Vintage Derby Car Show in Akron, Ohio. | On exhibit | |
| Toronto Motorama | Toronto | Ontario | 2020, 2022 | A single example, an all metal-clad racer from the 1960s, was exhibited in the Bodymotive Services kiosk at the Motorama Custom Car & Motorsports Expo in 2020. In 2022 the car competed at the Elora, Ontario soapbox derby. | Was on exhibit and raced | |
| Trans-Allegheny Lunatic Asylum | Weston | West Virginia | 2021 | Has a single racer piloted by Cumberland, Maryland entry Donald Saville of Romney, West Virginia, who competed as a class B entry in 1954, winning two heats, and a class A the following year. | On exhibit | |
| T.T. Wentworth Museum | Pensacola | Florida | 2017 | Now the Pensacola Museum of History, the former T.T. Wentworth Museum hosted in 2017 an exhibit titled From the Vault: Why and What We Collect, showcasing 120 artifacts described as "strange, beautiful and fascinating, from the University of West Florida Historic Trust collection." Among the artifacts was a Derby car piloted by 1961 Pensacola, Florida Champion Pat Ratley. | Was on exhibit | |
| Tustin Area Historical Museum | Tustin | California | 2021 | Exhibited on June 11, 2021, a racer (illustration pictured) piloted by 1948 Sidney, Nebraska Champion Marlin Clark, with Mr. Clark speaking of his Derby experience to guests in attendance. | Was on exhibit | |
| Tyler History Center | Youngstown | Ohio | Current | Has two cars on display, one a 1967 class A entry piloted by James Strock (pictured) and a second piloted by Donald Del Cessna, both who competed in Youngstown. Cessna won the Youngtown local race in 1968 and competed at the All-American Nationals in Akron where he advanced to the second round, winning his first heat. | On exhibit | |
| Unser Racing Museum | Los Ranchos de Albuquerque | New Mexico | 2023 | Featured two Derby cars piloted by 1960 Albuquerque, New Mexico Champion Lawrence Martin and 1966 Albuquerque, New Mexico Champion Richard E. Martin. The museum closed in 2023, with its collection being relocated to the Museum of American Speed in Lincoln, Nebraska. | Was on exhibit | |
| Vance-Tousey House | Lawrenceburg | Indiana | 2019 | Hosted an exhibit titled The Great Race, featuring Derby memorabilia and two cars, one piloted by 1968 entrant Ken Cofield and a second (illustration pictured) by 1969 Lawrenceburg, Indiana Champion Alfred Dewayne Uhlman. | Was on exhibit | |
| Verdigris Tea & Chocolate | Hudson | New York | 2025 | Hosted a fine art exhibit of paintings by Jack Fenn in the Verdigris Gallery from February 26 to April 1, 2025. Mr. Fenn participated in the Soap Box Derby in 1956 in Greenport, New York and exhibited his extant car (illustration pictured) alongside his work. | Was on exhibit | |
| Vintage Derby Car Show | Akron | Ohio | 3rd Friday in July | The Vintage Derby Car Show is an annual exhibit taking place during Race Week that culminates in the All-American World Championship in Akron, Ohio. The exhibit showcases extant vintage Derby racers and memorabilia that invites any and all Derby alumni to attend and participate, and is open to the general public. At its inaugural exhibit in 2022, an array of classic Derby car designs (pictured) was put on display. The event has exhibited annually since then, the 5th Vintage Derby Car Show taking place on July 17, 2026. | Was on exhibit | |
| Vintage Derby Car Show | Akron | Ohio | 3rd Friday in July | The oldest car at the 3rd Vintage Show in 2024, still showing collision damage from when it raced in 1952, was piloted by World Champion Joe Lunn. The car was exhibited again in 2026. | Was on exhibit | |
| Vintage Derby Car Show | Akron | Ohio | 3rd Friday in July | Oldest car at the 2nd Vintage Show in 2023 piloted by Indianapolis, Indiana Champion David M. Knight in 1953 | Was on exhibit | |
| Vintage Derby Car Show | Akron | Ohio | 3rd Friday in July | Pictured is a peeling brown racer piloted by 1956 Valparaiso, Indiana entrant Doug Hoback, on display at the 3rd Vintage Show in 2024. It was exhibited again in 2025 and 2026. Hoback's story of his struggle with lung cancer at age 13, succumbing just one day after his last race on July 28, 1956, made national media coverage. | Was on exhibit | |
| Vintage Derby Car Show | Akron | Ohio | 3rd Friday in July | Exhibited in 2022 was an original and unrestored racer piloted by 1961 Ashland, Ohio Champion James Stine. | Was on exhibit | |
| Vintage Derby Car Show | Akron | Ohio | 3rd Friday in July | At the 3rd Vintage Show in 2024 was a sit-up racer piloted by 1961 Mansfield, Ohio Champion Timothy Boyer. | Was on exhibit | |
| Vintage Derby Car Show | Akron | Ohio | 3rd Friday in July | On exhibit in 2024, 2025 and 2026 was a car piloted by 1969 New Philadelphia, Ohio Champion Jeff Bitticker. | Was on exhibit | |
| Vintage Derby Car Show | Akron | Ohio | 3rd Friday in July | A blue laydown car piloted by 1974 Conshohocken, Pennsylvania Champion Edward L. Myers Jr. was exhibited in 2024. Ed took 3rd at the 37th All-American and set the current track speed record in Akron. Mr. Myers (1961–2025) passed away on March 27, 2025. | Was on exhibit | |
| Vintage Derby Car Show | Akron | Ohio | 3rd Friday in July | On exhibit in 2026 was a restored, metallic-blue laydown car piloted by Mike Albertoni, who won the Suffield, Ohio Championship in 1975. | Was on exhibit | |
| Vintage Derby Car Show | Akron | Ohio | 3rd Friday in July | 2026 marked the first appearance of Phil Raber's Junion Division racer at the Vintage Show. Raber won the All-American Championship as a Junior in 1976, the inaugural year for the division. | Was on exhibit | |
| Virginia Museum of Transportation | Roanoke | Virginia | 2025 | Has on exhibit a tree-display of four Derby cars (pictured) from different decades. They include, from the top, Tim Royer's orange Super Stock car from 2001 to 2003, Roanoke, Virginia Champion Michael Jay Dobie's blue car from 1966, Roanoke, Virginia Champion Charles "Kim" Lineberry III's yellow car from 1969, and an unidentified red entry from the 1950s. As recent as March 2025 Dobie's blue car was not part of the display. | On exhibit | |
| Vortaunus Museum | Oberursel | Germany | Current | Has numerous cars on exhibit, including those piloted by 1950 German Champion Alfred Hänle, 1955 German Champion Heinz Soethof, 1967 German Champion Klaus Rohde, 1968 German Champion Bernd Schacherl, 1971 German Champion Karl-Heinz Peter and 1983 German Sr. Champion Rieke Monschauer. | On exhibit | |
| Waukesha County Historical Society & Museum | Waukesha | Wisconsin | 2019 | Exhibited a car (illustration pictured) piloted by 1947 Waukesha, Wisconsin Champion Jack Chapman (1932–2019). | On exhibit | |
| Wayne County Historical Museum | Richmond | Indiana | Current | Has four cars suspended above the museum floor, including a red needle-nose, class B entry piloted by 1968 Richmond, Indiana Champion James B. Wells II (pictured). | On exhibit | |
| Wayne County Historical Museum | Richmond | Indiana | Current | A racer piloted by Tom Ebbinghouse, who competed in Richmond as a class B entry in 1968 | On exhibit | |
| Westerwald Landscape Museum | Hachenburg | Germany | 2018 | Hosted an exhibit titled Das Zeitalter des Kleinwagenwunders which celebrated the post-War emergence of small and micro-sized automobiles. In it was a display of German Soap Box Derby memorabilia and a single 1950s or 1960s car from that region. | Was on exhibit | |
| Whataburger | Tyler | Texas | 2022 | Located at 5003 Troup Highway in Tyler, TX, this fast food restaurant has an interior décor that honors the Soap Box Derby, including a single lay-back racer standing on its nose inside of a glass-enclosed display case. | On exhibit | |
| Wheels Museum | Albuquerque | New Mexico | 2026 | Located on the site of the historic Santa Fe Railroad Shops in downtown Albuquerque, the facility hosts a variety of historical artifacts, including at least two Derby cars on the display floor. One of them is a Junior Division racer piloted by Nicholas Lerner, who took third place at the 1989 local Albuquerque race. | On exhibit | |
| Wheels Through Time Motorcycle Museum | Maggie Valley | North Carolina | 2025 | In 2025 two Derby cars were accepted to the museum, donated by their builder/owner George Freeman from Canton, North Carolina, who raced in 1952 and 1953. | In collection | |
| Wisconsin Historical Museum | Madison | Wisconsin | 2010 | Hosted an exhibit titled Zoom! Whiz! Wow! A High-Speed History of Madison's Soap Box Derby, which ran July 26 through September 11, 2010. Included were memorabilia, trophies, photos of boys that participated, and some cars, including one by 1957 Madison Champion Van Steiner. | Was on exhibit | |
| Woodland Auto Display | Paso Robles | California | Current | Has at least three Derby cars, including a yellow sit-up model on exhibit next to motorized midget and go-cart racers, and two white California Mutual Insurance-sponsored entries, one piloted by Denis Mucciacito, who won the class A division in Ventura California in 1968. Mucciacito also raced in 1967, receiving the award for best upholstered car that year, and 1969. | On exhibit | |
| Ypsilanti Automotive Heritage Museum | Ypsilanti | Michigan | 2015 | Has a car (pictured) piloted by 1950 Ypsilanti, Michigan entry Bill Nickels. | On exhibit | |

== Sources ==
=== Books ===
- Iula, Jeff; Ignizio, Bill (2011). How I Saw It: My Photographic Memory of the Soap Box Derby. University of Akron Press. ISBN 978-1935603078.
- Eller, Richard (2024). Down the Hill: A Race to Remember. Redhawk Publications. ISBN 978-1959346449.

=== News ===
- "4 Win Trophies". The News of Cumberland County. July 17, 1940. p. 1 – via Newspapers.com.
- Trull, Mortimer (July 20, 1940). "Travis Boys Take Soap Box Derby Honors". Nashville Banner. p. 2 – via Newspapers.com.
- "Hopes For Forth Time Charm". Rapid City Journal. July 14, 1941. p. 10 – via Newspapers.com.
- "Snozzle-Puss Rides in Algona Derby Car". Kossuth County Advance. July 11, 1946. p. 4 – via Newspapers.com.
- "15,000 Saw Bay City Champ Crowned". The Bay City Times. July 14, 1946. p. 3 – via Newspapers.com.
- "Bruce Samoore Leaves Friday For Soap Box Derby At Akron". Jacksonville Journal Courier. August 16, 1946. p. 2 – via Newspapers.com.
- "Soap Box Derby Finish". The Zanesville Signal. August 19, 1946. p. 3 – via Newspapers.com.
- "Here Are Soap Box Derby Speedsters". The Algona Upper Des Moines. July 24, 1946. p. 1 – via Newspapers.com.
- "Kirkendall Champion Of First Coasting Derby". Naugatuck Daily News. July 26, 1948. p. 1 – via Newspapers.com.
- "Pairings For Soap Box Derby". The Muscatine Journal. July 2, 1949. p. 7 – via Newspapers.com.
- "Leo Pagel Emerges Champ". The Muscatine Journal. July 5, 1949. p. 1 – via Newspapers.com.
- "Entries in Official All-American Soap Box Derby 1949". The Atchison Daily Globe. July 10, 1949. p. 11 – via Newspapers.com.
- "Here Are Complete Results Of Derby". Akron Beacon Journal. August 8, 1949. p. 4 – via Newspapers.com.
- "Racers were lifted". Springfield News-Sun. July 9, 1950. p. 14 – via Newspapers.com.
- "Entries in Official All-American Soap Box Derby 1950". The Atchison Daily Globe. July 16, 1950. p. 12 – via Newspapers.com.
- "Loser Congratulates 1950 Champ". Springfield News-Sun. July 17, 1950. p. 1 – via Newspapers.com.
- Gerace, Harold R. (August 14, 1952). "Flint Soap Box Champion Winner in Two Heats at National Derby in Akron". The Flint Journal. Vol. 68. p. 12 – via Newspapers.com.
- Douglas, Reed (July 13, 1952). "Banks, 15, Of Emma Wins". Asheville Citizen-Times. p. 20 – via Newspapers.com.
- "Woodstock Boy Wins Way to Natl. Soap Box Derby". The Herald. July 24, 1952. p. 8 – via Newspapers.com.
- "All-American Derby". News Journal. August 11, 1952. p. 7 – via Newspapers.com.
- "We Salute". Asheville Citizen-Times. July 11, 1953. p. 12 – via Newspapers.com.
- "Ready To Go". Asheville Citizen-Times. July 12, 1953. p. 6 – via Newspapers.com.
- "Albany Boys Enter Derby". The Capital Journal. June 16, 1953. p. 12 – via Newspapers.com.
- "Official Program Class A Entries". The Capital Journal. July 17, 1953. p. 29 – via Newspapers.com.
- "12-Year-Old Wins Watertown's 1st Soap Box Derby". Rapid City Journal. No. 21956. July 21, 1953. p. 12 – via Newspapers.com. "He won the Class B Division for younger boys, then went on to defeat Dale Snyder, Class A Champion, for the derby title."
- "How They Finished Heat By Heat In Derby". Akron Beacon Journal. Vol. 114, no. 247. August 10, 1953. p. 3 – via Newspapers.com. "HEAT 42—Ronald L. Patrick, Evansville. Ind.; Orville Johnson, Watertown, S. D.; Robert Houchin, Albuquerque; 28:89."
- "30 Entered in Optimists' Soap Box Derby Sunday". Daily Sentinel. June 19, 1954. p. 2 – via Newspapers.com.
- "Derby Sponsors". The Cumberland News. July 10, 1954. p. 8 – via Newspapers.com.
- "Forty-Seven Boys Entered". The Cumberland News. July 16, 1955. p. 10 – via Newspapers.com.
- "Doug Hoback Dies of Cancer". Vidette-Messenger of Porter County. July 30, 1956. p. 1 – via Newspapers.com.
- "Death Halts Gritty Teenager's Drive To Win Soapbox Derby". The Midland Reporter-Telegram. July 31, 1956. p. 2 – via Newspapers.com.
- Lazarus, George (July 31, 1956). "Soap Boxer Foretells Death, Too, After Loss". Press-Telegram. p. 3 – via Newspapers.com.
- "Boy Fought Lung Cancer To Enter Soap Box Race". The Montreal Star. August 2, 1956. p. 25 – via Newspapers.com.
- "Knox Soap Box Derby Open to Boys 11 to 15". Knoxville Journal. March 14, 1957. p. 16 – via Newspapers.com.
- "Indiana Boy Wins Derby Prize". The Central New Jersey Home News. August 19, 1957. p. 2 – via Newspapers.com.
- "Dwight Polzin Sets Fast Pace In Soap Box Race". Vol. 83. The Flint Journal. July 12, 1958. p. 1 – via Newspaper.com. "15-Year-Old Class A Champion Eliminates Ronald Liska, Class B Titlist, by Clocking 28.8 Mph."
- "Heat-By-Heat Story Of All-American". Vol. 119, no. 255. The Akron Beacon Journal. August 18, 1958. p. 14 – via Newspaper.com. "HEAT 26-David Hilligoss, Anderson. Ind.: Dwight Harley Polzin, Flint, Mich.; Mark Burdette, Huntington, W. Va. 27:06."
- "Winner of Area Soap Box Derby Gets Ready for National Race". Battle Creek Enquirer. August 3, 1959. p. 4 – via Newspapers.com.
- "Mason City boy wins Soap Box Derby". Globe-Gazette. July 5, 1960. p. 14 – via Newspapers.com.
- "Steven Katz Is Derby Champion". The Flint Journal. July 9, 1960. p. 1 – via Newspapers.com.
- "Derby Racer Gets Lucky Money". The Flint Journal. August 14, 1960. p. 16 – via Newspapers.com.
- "Heat-By-Heat Results". Akron Beacon Journal. August 15, 1960. p. 15 – via Newspapers.com.
- "75 Expected To Compete In Soap Box Derby". Hartford Courant. August 15, 1960. p. 6 – via Newspapers.com.
- "1961 Entrants and Sponsors". The Free Lance-Star. July 21, 1961. p. 10 – via Newspapers.com.
- "Without An Ounce". The Akron Beacon Journal. July 21, 1961. p. 12 – via Newspapers.com.
- Pratt, Larry (July 1, 1962). "Hastings Youth Wins Derby Here". The Kalamazoo Gazette. p. 3 – via Newspapers.com.
- "Soap Box Derby Pairings Drawn". Belvidere Daily Republican. July 3, 1963. p. 1 – via Newspapers.com.
- "You Just Lean Back, Fellows!". The Times-Union. August 14, 1964. p. 9 – via Newspapers.com.
- "Loses in a Log, but Still Game". The Kansas City Star. July 4, 1965. p. 104 – via Newspapers.com.
- "1965 Soap Box Derby Starts At 2 Tomorrow". Charlotte News. July 5, 1965. p. 16 – via Newspapers.com.
- "Here's The Derby Rundown, Heat By Heat". Akron Beacon Journal. August 8, 1965. p. 10 – via Newspapers.com.
- Bush, Larry (June 29, 1966). "39 Racers Pass Final Inspection". Fort Pierce Tribune. p. 6 – via Newspapers.com.
- Hutcherson, Keith (July 17, 1966). "Williams Wins Derby Race". Winston-Salem Journal. p. 7 – via Newspapers.com.
- "Mike Dobie Qualifies For Derby". The Roanoke Times. August 5, 1966. p. 9 – via Newspapers.com.
- "Soap Box Victory Protested By Losers". Ventura County Star. July 5, 1967. p. 6 – via Newspapers.com.
- "When Johnny Carson was 13". Fort Worth Star-Telegram. March 22, 1968. p. 36 – via Newspapers.com.
- "Speedster". Ventura County Star. June 18, 1968. p. 3 – via Newspapers.com.
- "Accidents mar soap box derby". Camarillo Star. July 5, 1968. p. 7 – via Newspapers.com.
- "Derby Winner". Akron Beacon Journal. July 8, 1968. p. 5 – via Newspapers.com.
- "Jamie Wells Captures 1968 Opti-Derby". Palladium-Item. Vol. 138, no. 168. July 15, 1968. p. 14 – via Newspapers.com. "Jamie Wells, 11, winner of the 1968 Richmond Soap Box Derby"
- "Jamie Wells Captures 1968 Opti-Derby: Class B". Palladium-Item. Vol. 138, no. 168. July 15, 1968. p. 14 – via Newspapers.com.
- Most, Bruce (July 21, 1968). "Man Your Cars!...Soap Box Racers To Roll Saturday". The Muskegon Chronicle. Vol. 110. p. 23 – via Newspapers.com. "Racers and their sponsors are: Kim Eggeman, Sealed Power;"
- "The Derby Results". Akron Beacon Journal. August 25, 1968. p. 7 – via Newspapers.com.
- "Derby Entries". Ventura County Star. July 3, 1969. p. 11 – via Newspapers.com.
- "Ephrata Youth Derby Winner". Sunday News. July 20, 1969. p. 58 – via Newspapers.com.
- "Tom Tomasky Wins Reading Derby". The Ephrata Review. July 24, 1969. p. 13 – via Newspapers.com.
- McLelland, Bob (August 21, 1969). "Roanoke Derby Champ Draws 81st Heat". The World-News. p. 13 – via Newspapers.com.
- "New Castle car judged soap-boxiest". New Castle News. July 3, 1970. p. 14 – via Newspapers.com.
- "Soap Boxers to roll down Richburg Hill". Hattiesburg American. July 2, 1971. p. 11 – via Newspapers.com.
- "First Round Heats". Akron Beacon Journal. August 13, 1971. p. 68 – via Newspapers.com.
- "City Soap Box Champ Wins Banquet Cheers". The Cincinnati Enquirer. July 20, 1972. p. 37 – via Newspapers.com.
- "Rusty Fulp Is Winner Of Derby". News and Record. July 29, 1973. p. 48 – via Newspapers.com.
- "How They Finished, Heat By Heat". Akron Beacon Journal. August 19, 1973. p. 16 – via Newspapers.com.
- "A Big Hug". The Philadelphia Inquirer. July 5, 1974. p. 33 – via Newspapers.com.
- "Complete All-American Derby Results By Heats". Akron Beacon Journal. August 18, 1974. p. 12 – via Newspapers.com.
- Rice, Joan (July 13, 1975). "13-year-old wins derby in Portage". Akron Beacon Journal. p. 29 – via Newspapers.com.
- "Ohio Dominates Soap Box Derby". Marysville Journal-Tribune. August 16, 1976. p. 4 – via Newspapers.com.
- "Wooden racer takes Soap Box win". The Journal Times. June 27, 1977. p. 3 – via Newspapers.com.}
- "Derby Day The Lancaster Way". Lancaster Eagle-Gazette. July 19, 1978. p. 30 – via Newspapers.com.
- "Soap Box Derby day". Green Bay Press-Gazette. June 28, 1980. p. 30 – via Newspapers.com.
- "Derby entrants". The Montgomery Advertiser. August 15, 1980. p. 5 – via Newspapers.com.
- "44th Annual Soap Box Derby". Akron Beacon Journal. August 16, 1981. p. 8 – via Newspapers.com.
- "Heat-by-heat results from 45th Soap Box Derby". Akron Beacon Journal. August 15, 1982. p. 6 – via Newspapers.com.
- "Youthful Racers Coast to Victory". Charlotte Observer. July 15, 1985. p. 13 – via Newspapers.com.
- LaMendola, David (March 14, 1990). "Rio Rancho Derby Selects Racing Site". Albuquerque Journal. p. 1 – via Newspapers.com.
- "1990 Masters Champions". Akron Beacon Journal. October 6, 1990. p. 44 – via Newspapers.com.
- "Here's how Derby racers made way to the finals". Akron Beacon Journal. August 12, 1990. p. 14 – via Newspapers.com.
- "Maggi named 'Outstanding Youth'". Centre Daily Times. October 9, 1990. p. 15 – via Newspapers.com.
- Rudderow, Kay (January 11, 1991). "All Sports Hall of Fame". The News of Cumberland County. p. 3 – via Newspapers.com.
- Rudderow, Kay (May 21, 1991). "Rolling along with history". The News of Cumberland County. p. 1 – via Newspapers.com.
- "Saturday's winners by heat". Akron Beacon Journal. August 11, 1991. p. 17 – via Newspapers.com.
- "Derby: 15-year history". Messenger-Inquirer. August 17, 1992. p. 6C – via Newspapers.com.
- Schlosser, Jim (February 21, 1994). "Stored but not forgotten". News and Record. p. 33 – via Newspapers.com.
- Robb, Donna (August 16, 1994). "Area teens cruise through Derby wins". Akron Beacon Journal. p. 20 – via Newspapers.com.
- "Soap Box Derby results announced". The Herald-Palladium. August 30, 1994. p. 14 – via Newspapers.com.
- "Kent girl rolls up more derby victories". Akron Beacon Journal. August 15, 1995. p. 12 – via Newspapers.com.
- Mannix, Vin (May 30, 1996). "All in the family". Boca Raton News. p. 3A – via Newspapers.com.
- Benton, James C. (June 19, 1997). "Girl's races take her places". Akron Beacon Journal. p. 24 – via Newspapers.com.
- Mayse, James (July 31, 2001). "Boy wins 3rd at Soap Box championship". Messenger-Inquirer. p. 17 – via Newspapers.com.
- Ross, Chauncey (November 9, 2002). "Retro Racer". Indiana Gazette. p. 1 – via Newspapers.com.
- Ross, Chauncey (November 9, 2002). "Soap-box memorabilia donated". Indiana Gazette. p. 4 – via Newspapers.com.
- Higgins, Jillian (February 12, 2004). "Soapbox car fuels memories as donation to historic group". Staten Island Advance. p. 139 – via Newspapers.com.
- Longley, Maria (May 9, 2004). "11th annual Derby a family affair". Daily News Leader. p. A10 – via Newspapers.com.
- Griffith, Chelsea (November 28, 2004). "Sobel's-sponsored soapbox derby car donated to Kingsport City Archives". Kingsport Times-News. p. 1 – via Newspapers.com.
- Carney, Jim (October 13, 2007). "Derby car sent to Indy 500 museum". Akron Beacon Journal. p. B5.
- "Your View: America on Wheels optimistic about driving into future". Allentown Morning Call. September 15, 2010. p. 21.
- Hytrek, Nick (August 3, 2008). "Thrill of a lifetime". Sioux City Journal. p. 29.
- Peterson, Skip (January 24, 2009). "Dayton Sales Co. at Carillon Historical Park". Dayton Daily News. p. 24 – via Newspapers.com.
- "73rd All-American Soap Box Derby Top Finishers". Akron Beacon Journal. July 25, 2010. p. A008 – via Newspapers.com.
- Laurant, Darrell (February 6, 2012). "When kids were racing on the street, pg. 7". The News & Advance. p. 7 – via Newspapers.com.
- Laurant, Darrell (February 6, 2012). "When kids were racing on the street, pg. 9". The News & Advance. p. 9 – via Newspapers.com.
- Biliczky, Carol (July 3, 2012). "Derby's past comes to life". Akron Beacon Journal. p. A001 – via Newspapers.com.
- "78th FirstEnergy All-American Soap Box Derby Champions". Akron Beacon Journal. July 26, 2015. p. A012 – via Newspapers.com.
- Fasnacht, Andy (March 3, 2021). "Rolling down Main again". The Ephrata Review. p. A9 – via Newspapers.com.
- Clouse, Jim (June 6, 2019). "D.J. Kriser Wins Soap Box Derby". The Franklin Favorite. p. B1 – via Newspapers.com.
- Awad, Jenny (July 4, 2019). "Race down memory lane". The Dearborn County Register. p. A2 – via Newspapers.com.
- Clarke, Grace (July 24, 2023). "Annual derby crowns new champions". Akron Beacon Journal. p. A3 – via Newspapers.com.
- Williams, Patrick (July 9, 2025). "Soap Box Derby brings $5M to area's economy". Akron Beacon Journal. p. A011 – via Newspapers.com.
- Williams, Patrick (July 11, 2025). "Soap Box Derby brings $5M to area's economy". Times Recorder. p. B6 – via Newspapers.com.
- Sheehan, Daniel (January 9, 2026). "A major Wilmington exhibit begins journey to new home". Star-News. p. A3 – via Newspapers.com.

=== Websites ===
- "Soap Box Derby Car: Bob Turner". International Soap Box Derby. July 28, 2023. "Bob Turner won the first All-American Soap Box Derby in Dayton in 1934"
- "Soap Box Derby Car used by Robert J. Pusateri". National Museum of American History.
- "Soap Box Derby Museum and Racetrack". Visit Fairfield County.
- "Soapbox Derby". Museum of American Speed.
- "Jaycees Soap Box Derby Car". Sioux City Public Museum.
- "Soap Box Derby Car used by Laura Shepherd". National Museum of American History. June 1997.
- "Clifford Swartz Obituary". February 14, 2003 – via MLive.
- "Soap Box Derby Car Driven by 1971 Indy 500 Rookie of the Year Denny Zimmerman Donated to IMS Museum". Indianapolis Motor Speedway. 2007.
- Knight, Brian (August 2007). "Life Before Video Games". Internet Archive.
- "Museography, Summer 2009, page 3" (PDF). Kalamazoo Museum. Summer 2009.
- Glasson, Russ (November 24, 2009). "Soap Box Derby Car Winner". Flickr.
- Collins, Bob (December 9, 2009). "When the Soap Box Derby was king". Minnesota Public Radio.
- "Main Court Room Gallery". Lynchburg Museum. 2010.
- Lundeen, Lauren (February 25, 2010). "The race that meant more near Duluth's Hartley Nature Center". University of Akron Press Publications.
- Roose, Brittany (October 2025). "A Little BBQ Joint 2". Google Maps.
- "Soap Box Derby Exhibit Opens June 8 at NYS Museum". Internet Archive. June 3, 2010. Archived from the original on December 19, 2024.
- "Madison museum hosts soap box derby exhibit". Twin Cities Pioneer Press. July 1, 2010.
- "The Thrill of the Hill – Image Gallery Essay". Wisconsin Historical Society. July 26, 2010.
- Capriglione, Matt (August 23, 2010). "Eastern Museum of Motor Racing". Flickr.
- Cuffe, Michael (September 11, 2010). "The Marvelous Museum: A Mark Dion Project - Oakland Museum of California - Michael Cuffe Productions" – via Vimeo.
- "Lucky Lisa's Soap Box Derby Car". January 26, 2011 – via Facebook.
- "The Marvelous Museum: A Mark Dion Project". For-Site Foundation. September 11, 2010.
- Hoffman, David (April 10, 2011). "Soap Box Derby Car, 1949". Flickr.
- "Obituary of Richard E Zicari". Harris Funeral Home. August 2011.
- "Cape Fear Museum". Star-News Online. November 11, 2011.
- "Bob Carter and wife donated this 1961 Soap Box Derby racer". April 20, 2012 – via Facebook.
- "Gilmore Car Museum 2". May 2012.
- "David W. Gard, 53, industrialist, built cars". The Morning Journal. June 7, 2012.
- "Lorain County Historical Society". June 30, 2012 – via Facebook.
- "Penn College Among Primary Sponsors of Local Soap Box Derby". Pennsylvania College of Technology. July 13, 2012.
- Leise, Cindy (July 24, 2012). "Elyria resident's 1967 soap box triumph highlighted in museum display". The Chronicle Telegram. Archived from the original on August 29, 2012.
- "Old Bag Factory". Foursquare City Guide. August 13, 2012.
- "Fun Find! From the Museum's collection". Facebook. August 15, 2012.
- Itinerant Wanderer (September 15, 2012). "Antique Automobile Club of America Museum at Hershey, Pennsylvania". Flickr.
- "Very Old Soap Box Derby". Flickr. October 12, 2012.
- Blumel, Keith (November 12, 2012). "Garlits Museum". MediaCenter Plus.
- Grippo, Joe (December 2, 2012). "2012 EMMR #188, Eastern Museum of Motor Racing, York Springs, PA". Flickr.
- Grippo, Joe (December 2, 2012). "2012 EMMR #189, Eastern Museum of Motor Racing, York Springs, PA". Flickr.
- Richard, Terry (February 9, 2013). "Tacoma Museum District has it all: autos, glass, art, history". The Oregonian – OregonLive.
- Poole, Eric (February 12, 2013). "Race on! Group aims to revive Soap Box Derby". Ellwood City Ledger.
- "Parsons Historical Society Museum, Bill Schibi, 1949 Champion". May 28, 2013 – via Facebook.
- "3, 2, 1 … Start!". Stadtmuseum Duisburg. June 5, 2013.
- Spence Ross, April (August 24, 2013). "Look what's hanging at the G-boro Children's Museum!" – via Facebook.
- "Soap Box Derby". Geary History. November 6, 2013.
- Lindsay, Dave (October 6, 2013). "092213 Don Garlits Museum of Drag Racing 020". Flickr.
- Kowalke, Ron (April 24, 2014). "Auto racing's history on display at Pennsylvania's EMMR". Old Cars Weekly.
- Kowalke, Ron (April 24, 2014). "Auto racing's history on display at Pennsylvania's EMMR". Old Cars Weekly.
- Brault, Frank (July 29, 2014). "Saratoga Automobile Museum – Soap Box Derby". PBase.
- "Remembering The Soap Box Derby". Ink Free News. October 24, 2014.
- "What We Leave Behind". Tumbler. October 22, 2014.
- "Soap Box Derby Racer". Kansas Historical Society. December 2014.
- Whetzel, Dan (2015). "Soap Box Derby" (PDF). Mountain Discoveries.
- "Allegany Museum". June 8, 2015 – via Facebook.
- sunivroc (July 10, 2015). "EMMR – Soap Box Derby Car". Flickr.
- "Soap Box Derby Memorabilia at Landmark General Store". Business Journal Daily. July 17, 2015.
- "1960 racer goes on display". Tribune Chronicle. July 25, 2015.
- "Parsons Historical Society Museum". July 27, 2015 – via Facebook.
- "Gardner Museum Hartshorn". October 2015.
- Olson House, Karen (November 2015). "A memorable museum celebrates motorsports and auto heritage". Carolina Country.
- "Greater Syracuse Sports Hall of Fame Museum". Greater Syracuse Sports Hall of Fame. 2016.
- "Parsons Historical Society Museum, Jerry Schibi, 1950 Champion". January 24, 2016 – via Facebook.
- "Cole Land Transportation Museum". March 29, 2016 – via Facebook.
- "Pee Dee Soap Box Derby". Florence County Museum. April 2016.
- tenwaymom (April 2016). "Don Garlits Museum of Drag Racing, photo 255 out of 355". Tripadvisor.
- "1939 Soap Box Derby Car – Artifact number 87.199.1". The Henry Ford Museum.
- "Es Lebe der Sport". Kassel.de – Stadtmuseum.
- Yuh, VP (June 2016). "A museum with an interesting approach". Trip advisor.
- Dauphin, Bill (June 5, 2016). "...even Soapbox Derby cars! at Eastern Museum of Motor Racing" – via Facebook.
- Boas, Ray (July 3, 2016). "Two Night Experiment – Saratoga Springs – 28–30 June 2016". Shunpiking.
- Burleson, Anna (July 15, 2016). "Winners reflect on once popular Watertown Soap Box Derby event". The Public Opinion.
- Dutch, Susan (August 6, 2016). "Greater Syracuse Sports Hall of Fame Museum TV spot" – via YouTube.
- M, James (September 2016). "The Magnolia Plantation Bed And Breakfast Inn". Tripadvisor.
- Peiris, Sandika (November 2016). "Miriam P. Brenner Children's Museum".
- "Nice museum, photo 51 of 68". Tripadvisor. November 2016.
- "Photos for Lynchburg Museum, photo 8 of 20". Yelp. December 16, 2016.
- "From the Collection: Soapbox Derby Car". Hennepin History. January 12, 2017.
- O'Shea, Ryan (February 15, 2017). "Times Today: Soap box derby history lives on at Beaver Falls museum" – via YouTube.
- "In Memory of Mark A Lehmann". centrallittlemaroons72. March 3, 2017.
- "Racer, Derby – 1960 Derby Championship – Object number 2017.003.01". Old State House Museum. March 1, 2017.
- Todd, L. (April 20, 2017). "Fort Stockton TX and Deming NM". The Traveling Todds.
- Rainville, Dan (May 13, 2017). "Second wax museum auction held in Gettysburg". The Evening Sun.
- Oyesanmi, Oyedotun (June 2017). "Monroe County History Center - Full-O-Pep". Google Maps.
- Matter, Dark (June 2017). "The Codington County Heritage Museum". Google Maps.
- "UWF Historic Trust presents new exhibition at the T.T. Wentworth, Jr. Museum". University of West Florida Newsroom. June 2, 2017.
- "T.T. Wentworth Museum exhibit answers 'what is that'?". Pensacola News Journal. July 6, 2017.
- "Soap Box Derby Hall of Famers look back". Akron Beacon Journal. July 22, 2017.
- Bell, Diane (July 26, 2017). "'The Graphite Kid' returns to lead national soap box derby parade". The San Diego Union-Tribune.
- Paquin, Lani (August 2017). "Owls Head Transportation Museum".
- Subastian, Greg (August 2017). "International Motorsports Hall of Fame - Walldrip".
- seventy-threegmcsquare (August 31, 2017). "LeMay – America's Car Museum". Instagram.
- "Kinderautomobile Und Seifenkisten". Vortaunusmuseum.
- Olson, Steve (January 2018). "Kossuth County Agricultural & Motorsports Museum". Google Maps.
- Blanchette, David (January 2018). "Inside account: Fred Engelbach". The Source.
- "Award-Winning Inaugural Year For Museum". New Hampshire Motor Speedway. February 23, 2018.
- Noriega, Rafael (March 2018). "The Strong National Museum of Play".
- "On display, pg. 20". Washington Coast Magazine. March 1, 2018.
- G., Nikkie (March 2018). "Colorado Springs Pioneers Museum". Google.
- "Mit Kleinwagen begann das Wirtschaftswunder". Westerwald Kurier. March 4, 2018.
- T, Trevor (April 1, 2018). "Louwman Museum". Flickr.
- "Design Aerodinâmico – Metáfora do Futuro". Museu da Casa Brasileira. April 21, 2018.
- "Museu da Casa Brasileira". Google Images.
- "Silver Creek Museum Photos". Stephenson County Antique Engine Club.
- "D is for Soap Box Derby". Colorado Springs Pioneers Museum.
- Yates, Jared (May 23, 2018). "A Visit to the History Museum of Catawba County". Macaroni Kid.
- "Crawford Museum". Instagram. June 16, 2018.
- Noh, Sichong (July 2018). "Monroe County History Center".
- Noh, Sichong (July 2018). "Monroe County History Center - Schmalz's Special".
- L, Don (July 2018). "Excellent Ribs Outrageous Fun, image 12 of 43 in Interior" – via Tripadvisor.
- Holly Hauser, Rhonda (July 10, 2018). "Hanging out with the 2nd place 1950 soapbox derby winner" – via Facebook.
- Lyles, Samantha (July 31, 2018). "Soapbox Derby winner donates car to Historical Commission". Darlington News and Press.
- "The Heritage Center: Soap Box Derby champ". Springfield News-Sun. July 27, 2018.
- Beamsley, Kelly (August 2018). "Ice House Museum".
- "New Soap Box Derby Car to be added to the display". Instagram. August 3, 2018.
- "History Humpday: Highlights From The History Department". Instagram. August 15, 2018.
- "Michigan racing legend donates car to Clinton County Historical Museum". Paine Gillam Scott Museum. September 27, 2018.
- Dahlman, Ryan (October 4, 2018). "Soapbox derby history featured at Museum". Southwest Booster.
- "Gregg Bordowitz at Cooley Gallery, Portland, Oregon". ARTnews. October 10, 2018.
- "Today we celebrate International Day of the Girl". Facebook. October 11, 2018.
- "Cafe Moto". Google Maps. November 2018.
- Swiatowy, Gary (December 3, 2018). "Don Garlits Museum of Drag Racing 386". Flickr.
- "Motorcycles, Bicycles and Children's Toys". Cole Land Transportation Museum. February 13, 2019.
- Junk, Es (March 2019). "Stables Cafe 1".
- "Waukesha County Historical Society & Museum". March 30, 2019 – via Facebook.
- Jalilov, Iskandar (April 2019). "Kalamazoo Valley Museum". Google Maps.
- Ellis, David (April 28, 2019). "National Automotive and Truck Museum 04-28-2019 118 – Keefer Printing Soap Box Derby Car". Flickr.
- Ellis, David (April 28, 2019). "National Automotive and Truck Museum 04-28-2019 119 – Early Soap Box Derby Car". Flickr.
- "GM Futurliner #10". National Automotive and Truck Museum.
- Grangent, Rie (May 2019). "Greensboro History Museum".
- "The thrill of the soapbox derby". The Beacon Herald. May 10, 2019.
- "Clinton County RESA". May 17, 2019 – via Facebook.
- W, Leah (May 17, 2019). "7 photos for Floyd County Historical Museum". Yelp – Floyd County Historical Museum.
- "Annual Report" (PDF). McHenry County History. June 2019. p. 5.
- Berdeguez, Nick (June 2019). "Giuseppe's Steel City Pizza".
- G., George (June 3, 2019). "The James Madison Museum, Virginia (Where Gumbo was #325)". Travel Gumbo.
- "Miniature racers". Ellwood City Ledger. June 13, 2019.
- G., George (June 19, 2019). "Jay Meyer had always hoped". Instagram.
- Speed, Mark (July 2019). "International Motorsports Hall of Fame - Wright".
- Duffy, John (July 2019). "Larz Anderson Auto Museum".
- Bruck, Renee (July 18, 2019). "Indiana resident's search for winning Soapbox Derby car". Indiana State Museum via Internet Archive. Archived from the original on March 3, 2024.
- "11-year old from Gretna wins Soap Box Derby World Championship". 3NewsNow. July 23, 2019. "An Omaha-area middle schooler became the first Omaha Soap Box Derby racer to win the world championship since the 1930's"
- Dempsey, Andrew (August 2019). "International Motorsports Hall of Fame - Matt Wright".
- Richard, Mike (August 17, 2019). "Hartshorn races in national soapbox derby". The Gardner News.
- WSIU-TV (August 22, 2019). "Illinois Stories Rt 66 Motorheads WSEC TV PBS Springfield" – via YouTube.
- Hanebutt, Joni (August 23, 2019). "Springfield, IL/USA-8/23/19:Motorheads bar and restaurant where the décor is made up of old signs, cars and parts". Alamy.
- "New England Racing Museum". Automotive Museum Guide. August 24, 2019.
- "Maintaining the Legacy of Lawrenceburg's Vance-Tousey House". Indiana Landmarks. August 25, 2019.
- "Car, Soap Box Derby: Object #H.2004.124.1s". North Carolina Museum of History.
- Kent, Gabriel (October 2019). "Cafe Moto 1". Google Maps.
- Hawley, Tom (October 3, 2019). "Video Vault/Las Vegas history comes alive". KSNV.
- "Explore Exhibits – Marion Boyle Children's Room". Peekskill Museum. October 14, 2019.
- Sanford Museum & Planetarium (November 18, 2019). "The next Coffee with the Curators is coming up!" – via Facebook.
- Delaine, Pascal (November 2019). "Landschaftsmuseum Westerwald".
- Mays, Steve (November 26, 2019). "Governor Motor Company". Flickr.
- Shinyuhan (December 2019). "Stables Cafe".
- F, Stan (December 29, 2019). "Soap Box Derby Cars". Flickr.
- "Cozy guesthouse by the harbor in Ærøskøbing". Arome Cafe. 2020.
- Quine, Thomas (January 23, 2020). "Winning soap box derby car". Flickr.
- Heen, Deb (February 2020). "Heritage Center of Clark County". Google Maps.
- Vranas, Chuck (March 19, 2020). "Toronto Motorama Mayhem Serves Up Heavy Dose of Traditional Hot Rods and Customs". In The Garage Media, image #57 of 97.
- "Beech Creek/Marsh Creek Watershed Heritage Museum Group". April 19, 2020 – via Facebook.
- "Dayton History". Instagram. May 31, 2020.
- "A little history from the Midwest". Instagram – Okoboji Classic Cars. June 14, 2020.
- "Smoky Hill Museum". July 4, 2020 – via Facebook.
- "Simpson County Historical Society, Inc". July 6, 2020 – via Facebook.
- "South Dakota State Historical Society". July 13, 2020 – via Facebook.
- Hitch, Nc (September 2020). "Gilmore Car Museum".
- "Ausstellung "Kindheit im Ruhrgebiet": Neue Ausstellung in Essen weckt Erinnerungen". Ruhr Nachrichten. September 7, 2020.
- "Donald F. Strub, 1934–2020". Tribune Chronicle. September 15, 2020.
- "Come see Bobby Blue". Instagram. September 17, 2020.
- "Meine Kindheit im Ruhrgebiet". Michaels Erlebnisblog. September 21, 2020.
- "Classic Car Museum". The Siouxland Blog. September 22, 2020.
- "Mahoning Valley Historical Society". October 21, 2020 – via Facebook.
- "There's a story to tell". November 7, 2020 – via Facebook.
- Piel, Wiljo (January 1, 2021). "Grevenbroich's Winning Soapbox Derby Is Ready for the Museum". RP Online.
- Toelle, Jennifer (January 29, 2021). "Smoky Hill Museum: Soapbox Derby Racing History" – via YouTube.
- "Behringer-Crawford Museum, Threshold 360". March 2021.
- Visit Deming (April 2021). "Deming Luna Mimbres Museum 2".
- "What's new at the St. Louis County Historical Society?". April 14, 2021 – via Facebook.
- "MoMA PS 1 opens the first major exhibition of works by Gregg Bordowitz". Art Daily. May 13, 2021.
- Bruinekool, Dave (May 2021). "Trans-Allegheny Lunatic Asylum 1".
- Marwan Travel (June 2021). "Trans-Allegheny Lunatic Asylum 2".
- Johnson, Johnny (June 5, 2021). "Tustin Area Historical Museum on Friday June 11th" – via Facebook.
- Sauers, Steve (June 5, 2021). "Join us at the museum" – via Facebook.
- Williamson, Dan (June 6, 2021). "Photos and video: St. Louis County Historical Society honors soap box derby world champion Bo Conrad". Duluth News Tribune.
- Ness, Emily (June 6, 2021). "1963 Duluth Soap Box Derby Winner Bo Conrad honored with exhibit at the Depot". WDIO ABC.
- Tustin Area Historical Society (June 9, 2021). "Night at the Museum" – via Facebook.
- "Martino Motor Sports". Instagram. July 9, 2021.
- Coughlin, Michelle (August 2021). "New England Racing Museum".
- Sparks, Tami (August 2021). "Deer Park Winery & Auto Museum".
- Coughlin, Michelle (August 2021). "New England Racing Museum 2012".
- Lover, Swan (October 2021). "Fredericksburg Area Museum".
- Lover, Swan (October 2021). "Fredericksburg Area Museum 1".
- "Embarking on a Journey Through Janesville History". A Little Time and a Keyboard. October 21, 2021.
- "Soap Box Derby Car". Flickr. December 19, 2021.
- "The Albuquerque Tribune Soap Box Derby Car". Flickr. December 19, 2021.
- Francia, Stephen (January 2022). "Ohio History Center".
- "The JC Breakfast Optimist Club Celebrates Optimism". JC Post. January 19, 2022.
- Ford-Boll, Mary (January 30, 2022). "Pretty excited" – via Facebook.
- "Northwest Connecticut Fire Fighting Museum". CTMQ. February 2022.
- Gilbert, Morgan (February 2022). "Deming Luna Mimbres Museum 1".
- Lee, Hye (March 2022). "Miriam P. Brenner Children's Museum 2".
- rose, Moon (March 2022). "Johnson County Museum". Google Maps.
- Zdonek, Jay (March 2022). "Owensboro Museum of Science and History". Google Maps.
- Sanchez, Jaime Jr. (April 2022). "Giuseppe's Steel City Pizza 1".
- "Photos of Wayne County Historical Museum". Tripadvisor. April 22, 2022.
- Fiechuk, Allen (April 30, 2022). "Collections Corner: Soap Box Derby". Historical and Genealogical Society of Indiana County.
- "Memories of the Soap Box Derby in Maine". April 30, 2022 – via Facebook.
- DH Kora, Darcie (May 2022). "Bad Dog Brewing Company".
- wolfman-al (May 8, 2022). "Oberursel 28". Deviant Art.
- "Featured Artifact". Web Archive - Allen County Museum. May 18, 2022. Archived from the original on May 18, 2022.
- Darden, Danielle (May 30, 2022). "A few more Talladega pics" – via Facebook.
- Gonzalez, Joseph (June 2022). "Edge Motor Museum".
- Wimberly, Taylor (June 2022). "Whataburger Jun 2022".
- Maier, Mark (June 2022). "Anderson County Museum".
- May, Caleb (June 2022). "Kansas Museum of History". Google Maps.
- "Magnolia Plantation Bed and Breakfast Inn". June 1, 2022 – via Facebook.
- "All-American Soap Box Derby". Edge Motor Museum.
- L, M (July 2022). "Elkhorn Valley Museum".
- Men, Men (July 2022). "Heritage Center of Dayton Manufacturing & Entrepreneurship".
- "Awesome action today at the Elora soapbox derby". July 1, 2022 – via Facebook.
- Curtis, Abigail (July 22, 2022). "How a New York native turned Belfast's fledgling history museum into a vibrant heart of the city". Bangor Daily News.
- Boyd, Kevin (July 21, 2022). "2022 Vintage Derby Car Show". Flickr.
- Boyd, Kevin (July 21, 2022). "2022 Vintage Derby Car Show - Miller". Flickr.
- Boyd, Kevin (July 21, 2022). "2022 Vintage Derby Car Show - Stine". Flickr.
- Boyd, Kevin (July 21, 2022). "2022 Vintage Derby Car Show - Stine 2". Flickr.
- "Menominee Heritage Museum". Facebook. July 6, 2022.
- "Menominee Heritage Museum 2". Facebook. July 13, 2022.
- "Menominee Heritage Museum 3". Facebook. July 20, 2022.
- "The Bag Factory". Instagram. August 2022.
- Hay, Phillip (September 2022). "Don Laughlin's Riverside Resort Hotel and Casino". Google.
- Gomez, Erlinda (September 2022). "Woodland Auto Display". Google Maps.
- Young, Terry (September 9, 2022). "Remembering Springfield Illinois Good Old Days". Facebook.
- "Soap Box Derby Car". Web Archive – Old School Museum. September 29, 2022. Archived from the original on September 29, 2022.
- Paans, Marco (October 2022). "Louwman Museum". Google Maps.
- "1910 FORD Garage Museum- Benton, Illinois- Car Tour". October 27, 2022 – via YouTube.
- Fitts, Brandon (October 29, 2022). "At The Garage". Facebook.
- "Mattatuck Museum". Instagram. November 9, 2022.
- "Subsequence Salon: vol.2 My Archive 1". Subsequence Magazine. November 25, 2022.
- "Subsequence Salon: vol.2 My Archive 2". Subsequence Magazine. December 23, 2022.
- "All Sports Museum and Hall of Fame of Southern New Jersey". NJ Southern Shore. 2023.
- "2023 Visitor Guide" (PDF). St. Catharines. 2023. p. 2, item 6.
- "All Sports Museum Collections Gallery". All Sports Museum of Southern New Jersey.
- "Waterbury's Soapbox Derby". Mattatuck Museum. January 8, 2023.
- Vaughan, Tamara (January 27, 2023). "Soap Box Derby Exhibit Opens at the High Point Museum". Yes! Weekly.
- Pomorski, Michal (March 2023). "Unser Racing Museum". Google.
- "Museum program to feature early soap box derby drivers". Yahoo. March 15, 2023.
- Taylor, Lucky (April 2023). "Whataburger Apr 2023".
- B, Ed (April 2023). "Bad Dog Brewing Company 2".
- Anderson, Dave (June 19, 2023). "Holding On To History: The glory days of Northland Soap Box Derby racing". Northern News Now.
- "New to You: Recent Artifact Donations". Sioux City. May 16, 2023.
- Hoffman, Patricia (May 2023). "Saratoga Automobile Museum – Patricia Hoffman".
- Schmidt, Fritz jr. (May 17, 2023). "50 Opel Exhibits, 5,000 Visitors". DieWerkhalle.
- Jäger, Markus (May 21, 2023). "Rüsselsheim: Heinrich "Heini" Walter and his soapbox car". Main-Spitze.
- Upchurch, Marilyn (May 29, 2023). "Unser Racing Museum officially closes its doors". KRQE NEWS 13 - Breaking News, Albuquerque News, New Mexico News, Weather, and Videos. KRQE.
- "Grand Opening". May 26, 2023 – via Facebook.
- Jurassic “Wolfe” Parkwars (May 2023). "Albany Regional Museum".
- Hunter, Kelsey (June 1, 2023). "15 Best Things to Do in Bangor, ME". Adoring New England.
- Region of Waterloo Museums & Archives (June 17, 2023). "It is the Formula 1 Canadian Grand Prix weekend in Montreal!" – via Facebook.
- Briscoe, Gabe (July 2023). "Sioux City Public Museum – white car".
- Monroe County History Center (July 7, 2023). "Summer vacation was a great time to work on your soapbox derby car!" – via Facebook.
- Boyd, Kevin (July 20, 2022). "2023 Vintage Derby Car Show - Hunt". Flickr.
- Boyd, Kevin (July 20, 2022). "2023 Vintage Derby Car Show - Knight". Flickr.
- Briscoe, Gabe (July 2023). "Sioux City Public Museum – red car".
- Grabb, Brenda (August 2023). "Greenwood Antiques".
- Oors, Daniel (August 2023). "Stansbury Museum".
- Van Der Wege, Gary (September 15, 2023). "So… when in Kalamazoo, I visited the Gilmore Auto Museum". Google.
- "Issue no. 37, Fall 2023" (PDF). Richardson County Historical Society. Fall 2023.
- "Seiverling Museum, A Car and Pedal Car Museum is at Ephrata Fair". September 27, 2023 – via Facebook.
- "Seiverling Museum, A Car and Pedal Car Museum". September 27, 2023 – via Facebook.
- Mosocco, Ron (October 2023). "James Madison Museum of Orange County".
- Banks, Miya (November 13, 2023). "Soap box derby racers from 1968–71 collaborate with Newton museum on exhibit". Hickory Record.
- "Classic Soap Box Derby Racers (1933–1999)". Sketchup 3D Warehouse.
- Schwartz, Steven (December 2023). "Saratoga Automobile Museum".
- Nicholson, Joe (December 2023). "Museum of American Speed". Google Maps.
- "Don Laughlin's Classic Car Museum". Travel Nevada.
- "1910 Franklin County Garage & Auto Museum". Enjoy Illinois.
- "Lorain County Historical Society and The Hickories Travel Log". Mark Strecker's Historical Perspective.
- "Object number: H82.77.1". Oakland Museum of California Collections.
- Miller, Kathy (February 2024). "Hi-Way Diner, Miller".
- Sanford Museum & Planetarium (February 7, 2024). "Don't miss our wonderful new exhibit on the Soap Box Derby!" – via Facebook.
- Jones, Evan (February 4, 2024). "When I was 12" – via Facebook.
- sanfordmusaeum (February 7, 2024). "Don't miss our latest exhibit!" – via Facebook.
- "Verdigris Gallery presents Jack Fenn". Verdigris Tea & Chocolate. February 26, 2024.
- "Art and Artifact at Verdigris". The Gossips of Rivertown. February 28, 2024.
- Ortega, David (February 2024). "Big Putts Mini Golf".
- "Museum". Minnesota History Center.
- "Soap Box Derby Car". Greensboro History Museum.
- "Soapbox car:1975 Soapbox Derby Racer". Google Arts & Culture.
- "Gift of David Marra". Online collection, Museum of Play.
- "Gift of Richard E. Zicari". Online collection, Museum of Play.
- Austin, Dan. "Detroit News Building". Historic Detroit.
- "Coming to race with us on March 9th?". February 21, 2024 – via Facebook.
- "Richard Eller Debuts New Book Down The Hill: Catawba County's Soap Box Derby". Focus Newspaper. March 7, 2024.
- Eller, Richard (March 9, 2024). "Down the Hill: Catawba County's Soap Box Derby, 1967–1972" – via YouTube.
- Eller, Richard (March 9, 2024). "A Race to Remember". Catawba Valley British Motor Club.
- Reinholdt, Duane (March 17, 2024). "Soap Box Derby display at Sanford Museum!" – via Facebook.
- "Soap Box Derby Car Hidden History". March 21, 2024 – via YouTube.
- "Pitt to the Point visits A Woman's Place: A New Exhibit at the Heinz History Museum - 1:12". March 22, 2024 – via YouTube.
- "Akron History Center is ready to open: What's inside?". Akron Beacon Journal. March 26, 2024.
- Destefan, Ben (April 5, 2024). "Turn Back The Clock: Soap Box Derby car". Courier Express.
- "A pinewood derby car, sponsored by the Flint Journal, on display at Blackstone's Smokehouse in downtown Flint on Wednesday, April 17, 2024". Newskeepsake. April 17, 2024.
- "Flavors and artistry: Blackstone's offers unique dining experience in downtown Flint, image 16 of 20". MLive. April 20, 2024.
- "Down the Hill: Catawba County's Soap Box Derby 1967–1972". Redhawk Publications.
- Arsenault, Alicen (April 23, 2024). "June Events in Albany". Internet Archive. Archived from the original on April 23, 2024.
- "Greater Southwest Historical Museum Tours, image #10 of 15". Expedia.
- "Gallery: Museum Displays". Hattiesburg Area Historical Society.
- "Ready, Set, Go!". May 6, 2024 – via Facebook.
- "Edward Herman Berendt". April 23, 2024 – via Tomon Funeral Home.
- "American Treasures Tour Museum 2024". Flickr. May 11, 2024.
- Reese, Dave (May 11, 2024). "Several soap box derby cars were on display". Flickr.
- Sloan, Bob (May 13, 2024). "New Darlington County museum is 'something special'". SCNow.
- Otownmuseum (May 29, 2024). "Away We Go!". Instagram.
- Lane, Matthew (May 30, 2024). "The Kingsport Archives – 30 years of preserving our history". This Is Kingsport.
- Vo, Trung (June 2024). "Hi-Way Diner, Vo".
- Mendoza, Javier (June 2024). "Old Courthouse Museum 2".
- Sloan, Bob (June 2, 2024). "A simple view of our new Darlington County Museum - video @ 2:58 minutes" – via Facebook.
- Schwinn, Steve (July 2024). "Orangetown Historical Museum".
- Mathur, Anant (July 2024). "Kalamazoo Valley Museum 1". Google Maps.
- Boyd, Kevin (July 18, 2024). "2024 Vintage Derby Car Show - Bitticker". Flickr.
- Boyd, Kevin (July 19, 2024). "2024 Vintage Derby Car Show - Boyer". Flickr.
- Boyd, Kevin (July 19, 2024). "2024 Vintage Derby Car Show - Boyer 2". Flickr.
- Boyd, Kevin (July 18, 2024). "2024 Vintage Derby Car Show - Hohack". Flickr.
- Boyd, Kevin (July 19, 2024). "2024 Vintage Derby Car Show - Myer". Flickr.
- Boyd, Kevin (July 18, 2024). "2024 Vintage Derby Car Show - Wreck". Flickr.
- "Collection Feature: Soapbox Derby Car". August 2024 – via Facebook.
- Weppel, Simon (August 2024). "Old Courthouse Museum".
- Nguyen, Nam H. (September 2024). "Hi-Way Diner, Nguyen".
- Nguyen, Nam H. (September 2024). "Hi-Way Diner, Nguyen2".
- Stewart, Brend Lee (September 2024). "Isett Heritage Museum 1".
- "Kingsport Alerts". September 30, 2024 – via Facebook.
- "Kingsport Archives celebrating its 30th anniversary this month". KingsportTN.gov. September 30, 2024.
- Neri, Lorella (October 2024). "Osoyoos & District Museum and Archives". Google Maps.
- Frost, J (October 2024). "A Little BBQ Joint". Google Maps.
- "Warburg October Week: Museum seeks exhibits for interactive exhibition". Westfalen-Blatt. October 7, 2024.
- "Museum Treasures". Facebook. October 16, 2024.
- "Under beautiful sunshine". Instagram. October 17, 2024.
- Nguyen, Nam H. (October 18, 2024). ""Muscatine History Revisited," through August 25". River Cities' Reader.
- Nguyen, Nam H. (October 24, 2024). "75 x Warburg October Week" – via Facebook.
- Cottrell, Logan D. (November 1, 2024). "First Friday highlights Model Railroad Club in downtown Clarksburg (West Virginia)". The Exponent Telegram.
- "National Auto & Truck Museum". Flickr. November 13, 2024.
- "The Crumley House". November 15, 2024 – via Facebook.
- "Danny Redd's Post". November 26, 2024 – via Facebook.
- "I'm stoked to announce". November 26, 2024 – via Facebook.
- "Aroma Guesthouse". DK Hotels. 2025.
- "Aroma Guesthouse Aeroskobing". Hotels in Denmark. 2025.
- Corinth Maine Historical Society (January 17, 2025). "At the Historical Society Museum on Main Street" – via Facebook.
- "Join us on March 1st". Instagram. February 6, 2025.
- Koontz, Abigail (February 9, 2025). "Get a glimpse of local Soap Box Derby history at historical society's Miller House Museum". The Herald-Mail.
- "Photo of the Week: An Iconic Flint Soap Box Derby Car". 1836Live. February 17, 2025.
- "Washington County Historical Society hosts unveiling of restored soap box derby car". Local News 1. February 27, 2025.
- Fenn, Anne (February 27, 2025). "Jack's soap box derby is on display in Verdigris" – via Facebook.
- shukherman (December 23, 2024). "LeMay - America's Car Museum". Instagram.
- "Have you joined in on the Akron 200 celebration yet?". Instagram. March 2025.
- Nicole, Erica (March 2025). "Big Putts Mini Golf 1". Google Maps.
- "Lauderdale County Archives: Our newest museum acquisition". March 3, 2025 – via Facebook.
- Milne, Michael (March 13, 2025). "Discover the Hidden Gems of the Virginia Museum of Transportation". Hemmings.
- Otownmuseum (March 16, 2025). "Save The Date!". Instagram.
- "Toys. Is it all just a game?". Hessenpark. March 16, 2025.
- "Freilichtmuseum Hessenpark". March 16, 2025 – via Facebook.
- "Official Obituary of Edward L. Myers, Jr". Saul Funeral Homes. March 27, 2025.
- Campbell, Lenore (April 2025). "Akron History Center - Donald Strub".
- Karl, Steve (May 2025). "Akron History Center".
- Wolf, Jörg (May 2025). "Stallscheune aus Asterode".
- Poston, Eric (May 15, 2025). "Akron History Center highlights city's extensive past". Akron.com.
- Powell, Cheryl (May 17, 2025). "We took a field trip to the Akron History Center". Akron Beacon Journal.
- "52nd International Old Opel IG Annual Meeting". City of Troisdorf. May 29, 2025.
- "52nd International Old Opel IG Annual Meeting". Opel. May 29, 2025.
- "The big classic Opel meet in Troisdorf has started, image 7". Instagram. May 30, 2025.
- "Every Piece Has a Story". Instagram. June 21, 2025.
- Mangels, Gil (June 27, 2025). "This original 1946 racer and trophy won by Douglas Swisher" – via Facebook.
- "at Boone County Museum of History 1". July 4, 2025 – via Facebook.
- "at Boone County Museum of History 2". July 4, 2025 – via Facebook.
- DFW Car and Toy Museum, Eric (July 12, 2025). "A little bit of history, a whole lot of fun!". Instagram.
- "John "Jack" Lichter Obituary". Lentz Funeral Home. July 15, 2025.
- "John "Jack" Walter Lichter, tribute video @ 10:22". Lentz Funeral Home. July 15, 2025.
- Pentasuglio, Julia (July 17, 2025). "How Texas floods nearly paused this year's Vintage Soap Box Derby Car Show in Akron" – via Akron Beacon Journal.
- Boyd, Kevin (July 18, 2025). "2025 Vintage Derby Car Show - Bitticker". Flickr.
- Boyd, Kevin (July 18, 2025). "2025 Vintage Derby Car Show - Hoback". Flickr.
- Boyd, Kevin (July 18, 2025). "2025 Vintage Derby Car Show - Stead". Flickr.
- Next Act Retirement and Travel (July 31, 2025). "Inside Iowa's Hidden Museum, video @ 10:05" – via YouTube.
- Fayyaz, Saba (August 2025). "Old Customs House Hitzacker".
- "New Arrival!". August 30, 2025 – via Facebook.
- "Maggie's Downtown Post". September 22, 2025 – via Facebook.
- Cameron, Kyle (October 2025). "Osoyoos & District Museum and Archives 1".
- "Check out the newest feature in the Durant Vehicle Gallery - Soapbox Derby!". October 21, 2025 – via Facebook.
- "Check out the newest feature in the Durant Vehicle Gallery - Soapbox Derby!". Instagram. October 21, 2025.
- Heffley, Buddy (November 2025). "Mike's Place" – via Google Maps.
- "Mark your calendars". November 3, 2025 – via Facebook.
- "GHM100: Treasures. Legacies. Remix". Greensboro History Museum. November 11, 2025.
- "Today's post features several items that the Clark County Museum". November 14, 2025 – via Facebook.
- "Crawford Auto-Aviation Museum". November 25, 2025 – via Facebook.
- "Soap Box Derby car from 1976". November 20, 2025 – via Facebook.
- "Don't miss the display" – via Facebook.
- "1951 LPD Soap Box Derby Car Showcased in LPD HQ Museum". Lynchburg Police Foundation. November 26, 2025.
- "Soap box derby car from 1951 now displayed at Lynchburg Police Department". WSET ABC News. November 26, 2025.
- "Race on into the Greensboro History Museum". November 30, 2025 – via Facebook.
- Ward, J. (December 4, 2025). "New historical interactive exhibits installed at Sloan Museum's Durant Vehicle Gallery". Genesee County View.
- Blevins, Ken (December 10, 2025). "Cape Fear Museum preparing to close for its relocation downtown". Star-News Online.
- "Bonn: Exhibition highlights the contribution of Portuguese migration to German history". Bomdia Luxemburgo. December 12, 2025.
- Ward, Selena (January 2026). "Stables Cafe 2". Google Maps.
- "You can find out what soapbox racing has to do with free competition in the Reel". Instagram. February 9, 2026.
- "This project hit home hard!". Facebook. March 24, 2026.
- Good, Timothy (April 2026). "The Strong National Museum of Play 1". Google Maps.
- The Reverend Love DeLima, Eddie (April 2026). "Wheels Museum 1". Google Maps.
- Hakkaguy, C (April 2026). "Canadian Automotive Museum". Google Maps.
- May, Lisa (April 2026). "Louwman Museum 1". Google Maps.
- Stanley, James (April 2026). "Mike's Place 2". Google Maps.
- Sbaraglia, Dave (April 30, 2026). "Our newest addition". Facebook.
- Aldridge, Thomas (May 2026). "Vintage soapbox derby race car". Google Maps.
- "What a great evening at Business After Hours at the Mount Airy Museum of Regional History!". Facebook. May 8, 2026.
- "May Object of The Month". Instagram. May 17, 2026.
- "Today is the day for 'Columbus At Play!'". Facebook. May 19, 2026.
- "Family-Friendly Fun & Local History: "Columbus at Play" at the Columbus Museum". YouTube. May 22, 2026.
- "New exhibit at Mayo museum recalls Soap Box dreams from 1950s Ireland". Ireland Live. July 8, 2026.
- "The National Museum of Ireland at Turlough Park". Facebook. July 10, 2026.
- Boyd, Kevin (July 16, 2026). "2026 Vintage Derby Car Show - Wreck". Flickr.
- Boyd, Kevin (July 16, 2026). "2026 Vintage Derby Car Show - Hoback". Flickr.
- Boyd, Kevin (July 16, 2026). "2026 Vintage Derby Car Show - Suffield". Flickr.
- Boyd, Kevin (July 16, 2026). "2026 Vintage Derby Car Show". Flickr.
- Dixey, Jerry (July 16, 2026). "Vintage Soap Box Derby Car Show". Facebook.
- Boyd, Kevin (July 16, 2026). "2026 Vintage Derby Car Show - Bitticker". Flickr.
- Boyd, Kevin (July 16, 2026). "2026 Vintage Derby Car Show - Raber". Flickr.
- "History Is Meant to be Shared!". Facebook. August 17, 2026.
- "When I was 11&12 I was in the soapbox derby in Muskegon". Facebook. September 10, 2026. "I was put in touch with the Lakeshore Museum in Muskegon and they wanted it...which they now have on display."
- "Kim Eggeman". Facebook. September 10, 2026.
- "Now On Display". Facebook. August 17, 2026.
- "Soap Box Derby Car". Facebook. August 17, 2026.
- "The Soap Box Derby Racer: Built for Speed, Powered by Gravity Fast Facts". Facebook. August 24, 2026.
- "This one has been fun to curate!". Facebook. November 9, 2026. "Downhill Thrill: Soap Box Derby World Champions is a special exhibition showcasing an evolution of previous winning cars from various divisions of the "Greatest Amateur Racing Event in the World®.""
- "Isett Heritage Museum". Mindtrip.
- "54th Street Grill & Bar". Tripadvisor.
- "54th Street Grill & Bar 2". Tripadvisor.
- "Photo: Mini race car on display on the wall". Tripadvisor.
- "Stansbury Museum". Tripadvisor.
- "Teaching IOWA History - black car". Iowa Museum Association.
- "Teaching IOWA History - blue car". Iowa Museum Association.
- "Teaching IOWA History - yellow car". Iowa Museum Association.
- "The DePew House History & Exhibition". Orangetown Museum.
- "About Flint's Home for Gravity Racing". FlintSoapBox.
- "Hall of Fame Member Bob Gravett". Soap Box Derby.
- "When Soapboxes Raced Through Hitzacker". Hitzacker Museum. June 26, 2025.
- "Helmet worn by Karren Stead, the first girl to win the All American Soap Box Derby". National Museum of American History.
- Brinker, Mark (February 2015). "Car of the Day: 1952 Joe Lunn Racer". SuperCars.net.
- "Heritage Center of Dayton Manufacturing & Entrepreneurship". Carillon Historical Park. July 17, 2024.
- "A Day in Collections – Artifacts". St. Catharines Museum. November 22, 2016.
- "Atrium of Artifacts". Your Audio Tour.
- "The new permanent exhibition - You are part of history: Germany since 1945". Haus der Geschichte.
- "Catalog Number 2003.58.13". Kentucky History.
- "The Garage (Salina Educational Automotive Museum)". Automotive Museum Guide.
- "Wheels Museum". Wheels Museum.
- "Today is the day for 'Columbus At Play!, image 3 of 5". Columbus Museum.
- "1952 Kinsmen Classic". Canadian Automotive Museum.
- "Memory Lane Museum". Visit North Carolina.
- "Soapbox dreams in 1950s Ireland". National Museum of Ireland.
- "Soapbox dreams in Mayo". National Museum of Ireland.
- "Lakeshore Museum Center/Search the Collections: Kim Eggeman". Lakeshore Museum Center. "Enter a keyword below to search the collection."
- "Savoy's next Tireside Chat: 'The Soapbox Derby Story'". Old Cars Weekly. "opening of a new exhibition, Downhill Thrill: Soap Box Derby World Champions, the Savoy invites you to join us for a Tireside Chat offering personal insight into a beloved global tradition."
- "Now Showing—Downhill Thrill: Soap Box Derby World Champions". Savoy Automotive Museum. "special exhibition showcasing an evolution of previous winning cars from various divisions"
