= Courier-Post =

Newspaper published in Cherry Hill, New Jersey

Coordinates: 39.93960°N 75.04994°W

- Type: Daily newspaper
- Format: Broadsheet
- Owner: USA Today Co.
- Editor: Jason Alt
- General manager: William Janus
- Founded: 1875; 151 years ago, as the Post
- Headquarters: 301 Cuthbert Boulevard, Cherry Hill, New Jersey 08002, U.S.
- Circulation: 3,234 (as of 2024)
- ISSN: 1050-432X
- OCLC number: 12230254
- Website: courierpostonline.com

The Courier-Post is a morning daily newspaper that serves South Jersey in the Philadelphia metropolitan area. It is based in Cherry Hill, New Jersey, and serves most of Burlington, Camden, and Gloucester counties. The paper has 30,313 daily paid subscribers and 41,078 on Sunday.

As the fifth-largest newspaper published in New Jersey, the Courier-Post's main competitors are The Philadelphia Inquirer across the Delaware River in Pennsylvania, and the Burlington County Times and South Jersey Times in South Jersey.

Established in 1875, the Post moved to Camden in 1879. It merged with The Telegram in 1899 to become The Post & Telegram. In 1926, The Post & Telegram and the Camden Courier consolidated under owner J. David Stern.

The merged paper was bought by the Gannett newspaper chain in 1959.
