= South Jersey Times =

US newspaper

Coordinates: 39.725240°N 75.211716°W

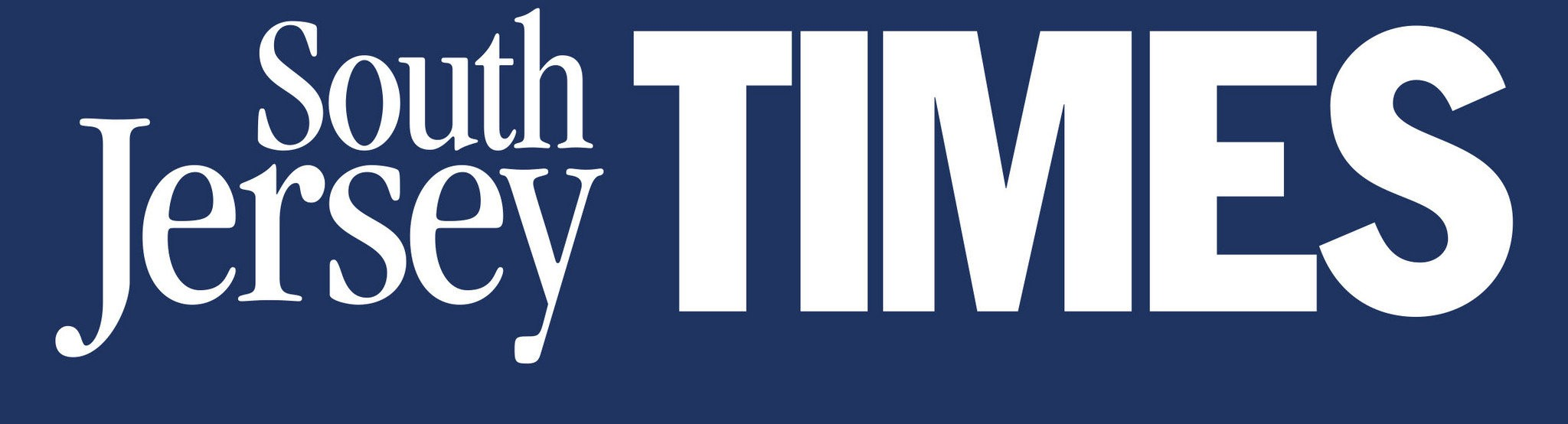

- Cover page February 4, 2013
- Type: Daily newspaper
- Owner: Advance Publications
- Publisher: Joseph P. Owens
- Editor: Tim Drummond
- Founded: 2012
- Language: English
- Headquarters: 161 Bridgeton Pike, Bldg. E Mullica Hill, New Jersey 08062
- Country: United States
- Website: www.nj.com/southjerseytimes/

The South Jersey Times is a newspaper serving the South Jersey area of New Jersey.

== History ==
The newspaper began publication on November 4, 2012, following a merger of three affiliated papers, Gloucester County Times, The News of Cumberland County and Today's Sunbeam of Salem, each of which were founded during the 1800s, and all of which ceased publication after their November 3, 2012 edition. The paper initially focused coverage on Camden, Cumberland, Gloucester and Salem counties before expanding to cover all of South Jersey. The paper, which brought over the staff of its predecessors and launched with a subscriber base of 30,000, is an affiliate of NJ.com.

As of July 2015, the publisher was Joseph P. Owens. Initially, the paper's main office took over the Gloucester County Times offices in Woodbury, with a satellite office in the former Today's Sunbeam office in Salem, until all operations were consolidated in a new building in Mullica Hill in 2015.

On Sept. 14, 2023, the paper announced it will cease publication of its Saturday print edition, moving to an all-digital delivery of the Saturday edition beginning in 2024.
