= The News of Cumberland County =

- Type: Daily newspaper
- Format: Broadsheet
- Owner: Advance Publications
- Founded: 1879 (originally the Bridgeton Evening News)
- Ceased publication: 2012 (merged into the South Jersey Times)
- Language: English
- Headquarters: Bridgeton, New Jersey
- Circulation: 7,238 (Mon-Sat)
- OCLC number: 13200431

The News of Cumberland County, previously the Bridgeton Evening News, was a daily newspaper in Cumberland County, New Jersey, United States. It was published from 1879 until 2012, when it merged with two other papers from the South Jersey area, Today's Sunbeam (of Salem) and the Gloucester County Times (of Woodbury), to form the South Jersey Times.

== History ==
The paper was founded as the Bridgeton Evening News in 1879. For most of its existence it focused on news in Bridgeton, New Jersey, but it produced a zoned edition for the neighboring city of Millville named the Millville Evening News as well. The paper was successful during the 20th century, attaining a circulation of over 25,000, the highest of any New Jersey paper south of Camden. In 1989 the paper's owners, the Schofield family, sold it to the American Publishing Company (now the Sun-Times Media Group). The company subsequently sold the Bridgeton Evening Times to MediaNews Group in 1996.

Advance Publications bought MediaNews' New Jersey and Pennsylvania newspapers in 2000. Advance renamed the paper Bridgeton News; the Millville zoned edition became the Millville News. Both editions were merged on November 3, 2008 to form The News of Cumberland County. In 2012 The News was merged with two other Advance Publications papers in the South Jersey area, Today's Sunbeam and the Gloucester County Times, to form the South Jersey Times. News staff were brought over to the new regional publication; its last edition was published on November 3, 2014.
