= List of newspapers in New Jersey =

This is a list of newspapers in New Jersey. There were, as of 2020, over 300 newspapers in print in New Jersey. Historically, there have been almost 2,000 newspapers published in New Jersey. The Constitutional Courant, founded in 1765 in Woodbridge, New Jersey, is the earliest known New Jersey newspaper.

== Daily newspapers ==
This is a list of all daily newspapers as of 2020 in New Jersey from the New Jersey Press Association Directory and other sources.

Current daily newspapers in New Jersey
Title	City	County	Year established	Parent Company or Publisher	References
America Oggi (Italian Language)	Norwood	Bergen	1988	Gruppo Editoriale Oggi	OCLC 73836670
Asbury Park Press	Asbury Park	Monmouth	1879	USA Today Co.	OCLC 16894042
Burlington County Times	Willingboro	Burlington	1958	USA Today Co.	OCLC 15288442
Courier News	Bridgewater	Somerset	1884	USA Today Co.	OCLC 14093085
Courier-Post	Cherry Hill Township	Camden	1875	USA Today Co.	OCLC 12230254
The Daily Journal	Vineland	Cumberland	1875	USA Today Co.	OCLC 11378844
Daily Record	Parsippany, Morristown	Morris	1900	USA Today Co.	OCLC 12777527
Daily Targum, Rutgers University (Student Newspaper)	New Brunswick	Middlesex	1869	Targum Publishing Company, Rutgers	OCLC 16045609
Herald News	Woodland Park	Passaic	1872	USA Today Co.	OCLC 16816434
Home News Tribune	East Brunswick	Middlesex	1879	USA Today Co.	OCLC 13854028
New Jersey Herald	Newton	Sussex	1829	USA Today Co.	OCLC 12198584
The Press of Atlantic City	Atlantic City	Atlantic	1895 as The Atlantic City Press	Lee Enterprises	OCLC 45193174
The Record	Woodland Park	Passaic	1895	USA Today Co.	OCLC 10806291
South Jersey Times	Mullica Hill	Gloucester	2012	Advance Publications	OCLC 1001971372
The Star-Ledger	Newark	Essex	1832	Advance Publications	OCLC 10944976
The Times	Trenton	Mercer	1882	Advance Publications	OCLC 849806689
The Trentonian	Trenton	Mercer	1946	Digital First Media	OCLC 13242242

== Special interest newspapers ==
Montclair State University assembled a list and report on ethnic media in the state in 2019 and 2023. The 2023 list has 141 media outlets.

- Amerikai Magyar népszava, szabadság (American Hungarian people's voice, liberty) East Brunswick, founded in 199?, OCLC 38591124
- The Armenian Reporter, Armenian interest, Paramus, founded in 2006, OCLC 137284990
- Attan-akamik News, Powhatan Renape Nation, Rancocas, founded in 198?, OCLC 44493901
- The Aquarian Weekly
- El Especialito, Spanish language, Union City, owned by USA Distributors, Inc.
- The Italian Tribune, Italian interests, Newark, founded in 1999, OCLC 46782455, ISSN 1535-3567
- Jewish Times of South Jersey, Jewish interest, Pleasantville, founded in 2000, publisher: Jewish Times, OCLC 44390746
- Latinos Unidos de Nueva Jersey, Spanish language
- The Manila Times East, Filipino issues, Jersey City, founded in 1986, publisher: Manila Times East, OCLC 15472229, ISSN 0893-2085
- New Jersey Jewish News, Jewish interest, Whippany, founded in 1998, publisher: Jewish Times, OCLC 40296978
- Pol-Am Journal, official newspaper, Association of the Sons of Poland, Jersey City, published in Scranton, Pennsylvania, OCLC 11109215, ISSN 0749-0429
- Quisqueya News, Spanish language, Newark, founded in 2002OCLC 1065970436
- The Arab Voice ( Ṣawt al-ʻurūbah), Arabic-English language, Paterson, founded in 1993, publisher: Dār Bīsān, OCLC 33873004
- Svoboda, Jersey City, Ukrainian National Association' daily, Ukrainian language
- La Tribuna de New Jersey & New York, Spanish language, Union City, publisher: Ruth Molenaar, OCLC 34535985
- Woman's Newspaper, women's issues, Princeton, New Jersey, founded in 1986, OCLC 14095785
- Xin xiang zhou kan (Chinese News Weekly), Chinese language Edison, founded in 1995, publisher: Chinese Newsweek Corp., OCLC 46777143, ISSN 1534-7249

== Non-daily local newspapers ==
- Americké Listy - Perth Amboy
- The Anatolia Post
- Anointed News Journal - Camden
- Atlantic County Record - Atlantic City
- Atlanticville - Monmouth Beach/Long Branch/Ocean Township
- The Beacon
- The Black River News
- Brazilian Press
- The Caldwell News
- Cape May County Herald - Cape May County, founded in 1968
- Cape May Star and Wave
- Cedar Grove Observer
- Cedar Grove/ Verona News
- The Chatham News
- The Cherry Hill Sun
- The Coast Star - Manasquan, Avon-By-The-Sea, Belmar, Bradley Beach, Brielle, Lake Como, Sea Girt, Spring Lake, Spring Lake Heights, Wall Township
- The Coaster - Asbury Park, founded in 1983
- Cranbury Press
- East Brunswick Sentinel - East Brunswick
- Edison Sentinel - Edison/Metuchen
- The East Hanover News
- The Florham Park News
- The Florham Park Eagle - Florham Park
- Florham Park Hanover this Week - Florham Park, Hanover
- The Galloway Patriot - Galloway Township
- The Grapevine Newspaper - Vineland
- The Hackettstown News
- The Haddonfield Sun
- The Hanover News
- Hammonton Gazette - Hammonton
- Hillsborough Beacon
- The HomeTown News - Wayne, Lincoln Park, Pequannock, Pompton Plains, Montville, Towaco, PineBrook, Fairfield, Pompton Lakes, Bloomingdale, Riverdale, Butler, Kinnelon, SmokeRise
- Hopewell Valley News
- The Hudson Reporter - Hudson County, with eight editions: Bayonne Community News, Hoboken Reporter, Jersey City Reporter, North Bergen Reporter, Union City Reporter, Secaucus Reporter, Weehawken Reporter, West New York Reporter
- The Hunterdon County Democrat - Flemington, Hunterdon County, founded in 1847, OCLC 4094634, ISSN 0018-7844
- The Independent - Aberdeen, Middletown, Keyport/Matawan, Holmdel, Hazlet
- The Independent Press - Summit
- The Item of Millburn and Short Hills - Millburn, founded in 1975, OCLC 12593151
- Jersey City Independent hyperlocal digital news
- The Lawrence Ledger
- The Livingston News
- The Madison News
- The Manville News
- The Marlton Sun
- The Medford Sun
- The Mendham News
- The Messenger-Press
- The Millburn/Short Hills News
- Micromedia Publications - Publishes the following newspapers: Ocean County News, The Toms River Times, The Manchester Times, The Berkeley Times, The Brick Times, The Jackson Times, The Southern Ocean Times, The Howell Times, Monmouth County News, Toms River Online, and Bricktown Online
- The Montgomery News (Montgomery Township and Rocky Hill)
- The Morristown News
- The Moorestown Sun
- Montclair Local
- The Montclair Times - Montclair
- The Mount Olive News
- The Mt. Laurel Sun
- New Brunswick Today
- Northern Valley Press
- The Nubian News
- The Observer - Kearny, New Jersey serving West Hudson & South Bergen
- Ocean City Sentinel
- OCNJ Current
- The Ocean Star - Bay Head, Brick Township, Lavallette, Mantoloking, Point Pleasant Beach, Point Pleasant Borough
- Pascack Press
- Pascack Valley Community Life
- The Pine Barrens Tribune -- serving the following communities mainly in Burlington County: Southampton, Medford, Evesham, Woodland, Tabernacle, Pemberton, Shamong, Bass River, and Washington townships, Medford Lakes and Pemberton Boroughs, as well as parts of western and southern Ocean County, northern Atlantic County and the Pinelands Regional School District.
- The Princeton Packet
- The Randolph News
- The Register-News
- Renna Media - publishes the following monthly newspapers: Around About Peterstown, Berkeley Heights Community News, The Chathams, Clark Monthly, Cranford Monthly, Elizabeth – Elmora Hills, Fanwood Post, Florham Park Press, Garwood Times, Green Brook Gazette, Kenilworth Life, Life In Linden, Long Hill Leader, Madison Monthly, Mountainside View, New Providence News, Our Town Rahway, Roselle Park Monthly, Scotch Plains Monthly, Millburn Short Hills Monthly, Summit Times, Spirit of Union, Warren Monthly, Watchung Post, and Westfield Monthly
- River View Observer - Hudson County
- The Roxbury News
- Union County HAWK
- The Shamong Sun
- Sokol Times - East Orange
- South Brunswick Post, South Brunswick, OCLC 48694596
- Summit Herald-Dispatch - Summit
- The Tabernacle Sun
- TAPinto, hyperlocal digital news in 50+ towns
- Town Topics - Princeton
- triCityNews - Monmouth County
- The Two River Times - Red Bank
- The Westfield Leader - Westfield founded 1890
- Union County Local Source
- Verona-Cedar Grove Times
- The Voorhies Sun
- The West Orange News
- Windsor-Hights Herald

== College newspapers and magazines ==
- The Beacon - William Patterson University (previously Patterson City Normal School)
- The Daily Princetonian - Princeton University (previously College of New Jersey)
- The Daily Targum - Rutgers University New Brunswick main campus (previously Queens College)
- The Gothic Times - New Jersey City University (previously New Jersey State Normal School at Jersey City)
- The Independent - Stockton University (previously Richard Stockton College of New Jersey)
- The Invention - Thomas Edison State University (previously Thomas Edison State College) (magazine)
- The Montclarion - Montclair State University (previously The State Normal School at Montclair)
- The Newark Targum - Rutgers University Newark Campus discontinued as of 2006
- The Ramapo News - Ramapo College of New Jersey
- The Setonian - Seton Hall University
- The Signal - The College of New Jersey (previously Trenton State Normal School)
- The Stute - Stevens Institute of Technology
- The Tower - Kean University (previously Newark State Normal School)
- The Vector - New Jersey Institute of Technology
- The Whit - Rowan University (previously Glassboro Normal School)

== Defunct newspapers ==
- The Armenian Reporter (Paramus) (2006-?)
- Atlantic City Gazette-Review (1916–1925)
- Atlantic City Jewish Record (1939–1996)
- The Budget (Millburn) (1879-1888)
- Carteret Press (1922-1965)
- Centinel of Freedom (Newark) (1796-1823)
- Common Sense (1946–1972)
- The Daily Journal (Elizabeth) (1960-1992)
- Daily Advance (Dover) (1965-1985)
- Dover Advance (1903-1914) (1923-1965)
- Dover Advance and the Iron Era (1914-1923)
- The Elizabeth Daily Journal (1868-1960)
- Gloucester County Times of Woodbury, founded in 1897, ceased publication in 2012, OCLC 11218944
- The Hudson County Democrat of Hoboken, New Jersey, founded in 1854, ceased publication in 1883, OCLC 10252989
- The Jersey Journal (1867–2025) OCLC 44512660
- Madison Weekly Eagle (1882–1891)
- Matawan Journal of Matawan, New Jersey founded 1869, ceased publication in 1961
- Morning Star (Newark)
- The Monitor (Millburn, Westfield) (1879-1886)
- Newark Evening News (1989–1990)
- The Newark Gazette (1799-1804)
- Newark Ledger
- The News of Cumberland County of Bridgeton, founded in 1879, ceased publication in 2012, OCLC 13200431
- Passaic Daily News (1891-1929)
- Paterson Evening News (1890–1987)
- Paterson Morning Call (1885-1977)
- Paterson Morning News
- Paterson Press-Guardian
- Today's Sunbeam of Salem, founded in 1819 (originally Salem Messenger), ceased publication in 2012, OCLC 14513784
- Vineland Independent (1867-1931)

== See also ==
- List of African-American newspapers in New Jersey
- Hi's Eye
- NJ.com
- New York City media
- Media of Philadelphia

Adjoining states

- List of newspapers in Delaware
- List of newspapers in Pennsylvania
- List of newspapers in New York

Comprehensive

- Lists of newspapers
- List of newspapers in the United States

Frequency

- List of free daily newspapers in the United States
- List of weekly newspapers in the United States

Circulation

- List of international newspapers originating in the United States
- List of national newspapers in the United States
- List of newspapers in the United States by circulation
- List of newspapers serving cities over 100,000 in the United States

Foreign language

- List of French-language newspapers published in the United States
- List of German-language newspapers published in the United States
- List of Spanish-language newspapers published in the United States

Specialty

- List of African-American newspapers in the United States
- List of alternative weekly newspapers in the United States
- List of business newspapers in the United States
- List of family-owned newspapers in the United States
- List of Jewish newspapers in the United States
- List of LGBTQ periodicals in the United States
- List of student newspapers in the United States
- List of supermarket tabloids in the United States
- List of underground press in the United States

Other

- List of defunct newspapers of the United States
