= Reaction to Action =

Single by Foreigner

from the album Agent Provocateur
- B-side: "She's Too Tough"
- Released: May 1985
- Recorded: 1984
- Genre: Hard rock; heavy metal; glam metal
- Length: 3:57 (album version); 3:32 (single version)
- Label: Atlantic
- Songwriters: Lou Gramm; Mick Jones
- Producers: Alex Sadkin; Mick Jones

Foreigner singles chronology
"That Was Yesterday" (1985)	"Reaction to Action" (1985)	"Growing Up the Hard Way" (1985)

"Reaction to Action" is the third single taken from the album Agent Provocateur by the band Foreigner. It was written by Lou Gramm and Mick Jones.

== Single release ==
Foreigner bassist Rick Wills thought that "Reaction to Action" should have been the 2nd single from Agent Provocateur following up on "I Want to Know What Love Is" rather than "That Was Yesterday."

The song was remixed for the single release. The B-side, "She's Too Tough", a rock and roll Elvis Presley-type song, is also featured on the European single release of "Growing Up the Hard Way".

== Reception ==
Cash Box said of the single that it "sounds like a winner for CHR and AOR," saying that "this hard-edged latest single amply displays Foreigner’s remarkable musical range and variety." Billboard said that after the band had released two ballads from Agent Provocateur ("I Want to Know What Love Is" and "That Was Yesterday"), Foreigner "now reclaims its alternate identity as ultimate headbangers." Courier Journal staff writer Michael Quinlan called it a "tough-minded, energetic" song that he thought should have been released as the first single from Agent Provocateur over "I Want to Know What Love Is."

Billings Gazette writer Chris Rubich called it a "typical heavy-metal anthem" with "heavy, choppy guitar chording" that serves as "counterpoint to [lead singer] Gramm's insistence that his lover respond." Daily Record critic Jim Bohen described it as "grinding guitar rock." The Pittsburgh Press critic Pete Bishop said that guitarist "Mick Jones's power chords burst out into winning lead guitar." Herald News writer Sean Daly regarded "Reaction to Action" as one of the "more forceful recordings" on Agent Provocateur. Music critic Alan Schmidt regarded "Reaction to Action" the best of the "heavy tunes" on the album. Kingsport Times-News critic Tom Matthews similarly called it "the strongest – and maybe the strangest – of the band's hard edge," calling it "loud, urgent-sounding, thudding rock that cries out for volume."

Morning Call critic Bob Sharpe said that "Reaction to Action" has "more in common with Billy Squier's 'Emotion in Motion' than just its title. Odessa American critic Ken Tucker similar said that it's "a loud, urgent squawk that beats posers like Billy Squier at their own game." Chilliwack Progress critic Matt Rogalsky felt John Cougar Mellencamp was a heavy influence, with the song's "choppy guitar lines and scratchy vocals." Rogalsky said that "this is rock built to sell." Muncie Evening News critic Rick Shefchik felt that it "sounds like the kind of hard rock they play in Third World countries where Led Zeppelin's first album just hit the stores. Allmusic critic Bret Adams later called the song "the epitome of bland, formulaic AOR."

Lou Gramm considered "Reaction to Action" his favorite song from Agent Provocateur.

== Chart performance ==
"Reaction to Action" reached #54 on the Billboard Hot 100. It also reached #44 on the Billboard Mainstream Rock Tracks chart.
