= Down on Love =

"Down On Love"

Single by Foreigner

from the album Agent Provocateur
- B-side: "Growing Up the Hard Way"
- Released: August 1985
- Recorded: 1984
- Genre: Rock
- Length: 4:08
- Label: Atlantic
- Songwriters: Lou Gramm; Mick Jones
- Producers: Alex Sadkin; Mick Jones

Foreigner singles chronology
"Growing Up the Hard Way" (1985)	"Down On Love" (1985)	"Say You Will" (1987)

"Down on Love" is the fourth single taken from the album Agent Provocateur by the band Foreigner, and released in August 1985.

The song was written by Lou Gramm and Mick Jones, and the B-side, "Growing Up the Hard Way", was itself released as an A-side single in Europe.

== Reception ==
Billboard said that the single "returns the group to the massive power ballad sound that's propelled their biggest pop hits." Cash Box said that "heart tugging sentimentality meets slickly professional rock" and predicted a "fast rise up the pop singles chart" based on Foreigner's "knack for slow rocking love tunes." The Pittsburgh Press critic Pete Bishop described it as an "'I-can-heal-your-heartache' ballad" that he compared to the lead single from Agent Provocateur, "I Want to Know What Love Is." Daily Record critic Jim Bohen described it as "synthesizer-orchestrated pop [ballad] of towering melodrama." The Sun music critic Alan Schmidt noted that while two other ballads from Agent Provocateur that were released as singles, "I Want to Know What Love Is" and "That Was Yesterday," are "full of the blues" then "Down on Love" provides a "ray of hope" with lyrics like "They've given up on finding someone new/But new love comes, it's gonna come for you." Billings Gazette writer Chris Rubich similarly wrote that it's a "song of reassurance that love deserves another chance."

Allmusic critic Bret Adams later praised the song's "pleasant chorus" and "warm keyboard melody." Tri-City Herald critic Jim Angell praised the synthesizer playing. But The Daily News Journal music writer Curt Anderson criticized the fact that the slow keyboard buildup goes nowhere, "as if the mere sound of a synthesizer is all the song needs."

== Chart performance ==
"Down on Love" reached #54 on the Billboard Hot 100. It reached #59 on the Cash Box Top 100 Singles chart. Fort Worth Star-Telegram pop music writer Roger Kaye stated that the song was a hit in the Dallas, Texas area even though it did not perform very well on the national charts. It was also a Top 20 hit in the Akron, Ohio area.
