= North Jersey Media Group =

Community newspaper publishing company

- Company type: Private
- Industry: Newspaper Publishing
- Founded: 1982; 44 years ago
- Headquarters: 1 Garret Mountain Plaza, Woodland Park, New Jersey, United States
- Area served: Northern New Jersey
- Products: Daily Record of Morris County; Herald News of Passaic County; The Record of Passaic County (formerly Bergen County); (201) Magazine of Bergen County
- Owner: USA Today Co.
- Subsidiaries: North Jersey Community Newspapers
- Website: northjersey.com

North Jersey Media Group is a newspaper publishing company headquartered in Woodland Park, New Jersey and owned by the Gannett Company, Inc. It publishes The Record, the Herald News of Passaic County, the Daily Record of Morris County, and other community newspapers and publications.

== History ==
North Jersey Media Group was formed in 1982 as Macromedia, Inc., an umbrella organization for all of the media interests of the Borg family, which had owned The Record, the second-largest newspaper in the state, since 1930. In 2000, the Borgs reorganized Macromedia as North Jersey Media Group. The company eventually grew to include the Herald News and a network of 50 community newspapers that cumulatively generated $90 million per-year in revenue.

On July 7, 2016, Gannett Company announced its intent to acquire North Jersey Media Group. Once the sale was finalized, Gannett merged the operations of the Daily Record into North Jersey Media Group.

On January 11, 2022, Alden Global Capital announced a partnership with NJMG to print and package the New York Daily News. NJMG is expected to begin printing the Daily News on March 12, 2022.

In addition to the three major properties and various local publications that make up North Jersey Media Group, Gannett also owns the Asbury Park Press, the Courier News of Somerville, the Courier-Post of Camden, The Daily Journal of Vineland, and the Home News Tribune in Middlesex County.
