= The Joint in the Woods =

Inn The Woods
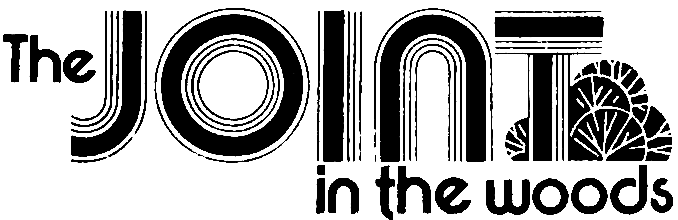
- Original logo in advertising and on billboard
- Former names: Joint In The Woods

General information
- Location: 400 Smith Road, Parsippany, New Jersey, United States
- Groundbreaking: Unknown
- Closed: circa March 1975
- Destroyed: September 11, 1977
- Owner: Crow-Foody

The Joint in the Woods, later renamed Inn The Woods, was a discothèque and rock music venue in Parsippany–Troy Hills, New Jersey. It was active in either 1973 or 1974, and shut down in early 1975, before being destroyed by fire in 1977.

Performers included Bruce Springsteen, Tower of Power, Lynyrd Skynyrd, Peter Frampton, Rush, Renaissance, and Kiss. The club also featured nightly prerecorded funk music by such DJs as Muggsy McGinnis.

Its peak period of prominence was in 1974, when the club faced press attention due to its controversial name after 14 months of being open. The marijuana reference ("Joint") concerned the local Town Council, who ordered the club to close until it could change its name.

By 1975, it had been renamed Inn The Woods due to town pressure, and it shut down in 1976.

The building was destroyed and levelled following a 1977 electrical fire.

== History ==
=== Establishment ===
The building was constructed in an unknown year (co-founder William Foody was unable to specify the age of the building when asked).

In either 1973 or 1974, the building was purchased by Crow‐Foody Central company of Saddle Brook.

According to its Morristown Daily Record advertisement, it was located at 400 Smith Road in Parsippany, and offered two nightly shows at 10 & 11:30, with $3 admission. One attendee recalled that it was "a plain shed-like building in a North Central Jersey forest". He added that the venue had "few seats", relegating crowds to stand as in general admission.

=== Name controversy ===
In July 1974, the Parsippany–Troy Hills Town Council ruled that the venue's name was "offensive to good taste". Township attorney Bertram Latzer said the name of the club was synonymous with marijuana and gave young people the impression that it was "a place of low repute". Joint In The Woods was thereby ordered to close its doors for 15 days, and change its name on all advertising within 60 days. The Council also claimed that the club's liquor license was invalid, but this claim was not substantiated.

Shortly thereafter, probably in 1974, the venue reopened under the name Inn The Woods. Its sign on Route 46 was repainted by early 1975.

=== Shut down ===
The club and bar shut down for unspecified reasons around March 1976.

=== Fire destruction ===
On Sunday September 11, 1977 at 3:30 PM, an electrical malfunction caused a fire at the former discothèque. The fire "raged through the building and broke through the roof shortly after people in a partially enclosed area of the building were evacuated".

There were no injuries or fatalities, a circumstance deemed a "miracle" by District-Six Fire Chief Andrew Tyrone.

More than 20 fire engines and 200 volunteer firefighters fought against the blaze; pictures of firefighters have been uploaded online. Following the fire, the former discothèque was destroyed. Afterwards, the shell of the building was levelled by bulldozer and tank.

== Legacy ==
An April 1975 article in the Morristown Daily Record detailed the club's popularity and controversial end, relating the history to the sign that still stood on Route 46.
