= Budget (disambiguation) =

Budget mostly refers to Budget, a financial plan. It may also refer to:

- Budget Rent a Car, the rental car company
- Budget Group of Companies, the car insurance company Budget
- The Budget, an Amish newspaper
- The Budget, a newspaper from Millburn, NJ
- "Budget", a song by Megan Thee Stallion and Latto from the album Traumazine, 2022
