= The Hudson Reporter =

Newspaper in Hudson County, New Jersey, US

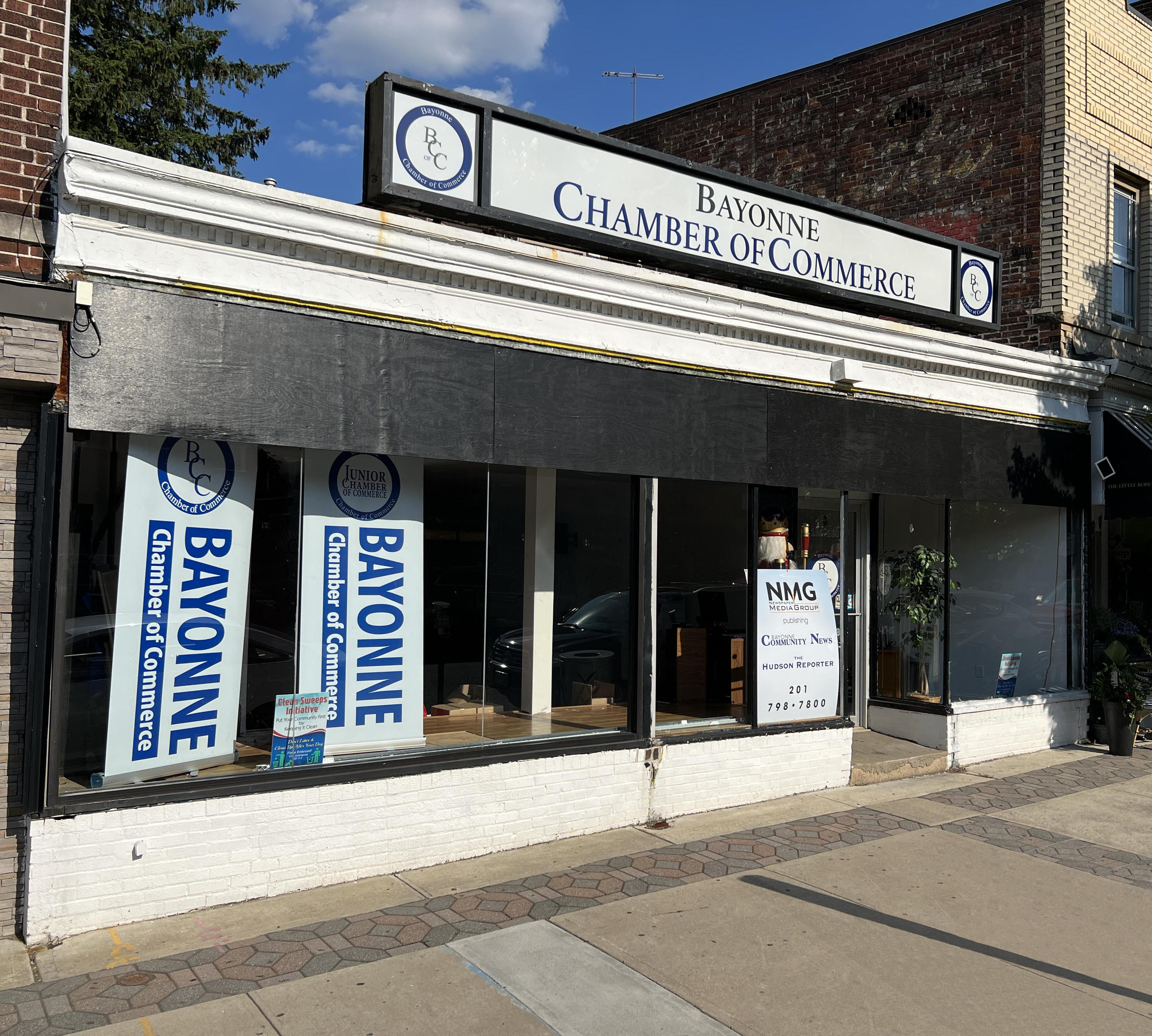
- Headquarters in June 2021
- Type: Weekly newspaper
- Owner: Newspaper Media Group
- Founder: Joseph Barry
- Editor: Caren Matzner
- Founded: 1983; 43 years ago
- Ceased publication: January 20, 2023
- Headquarters: 166-168 Broadway; Bayonne, New Jersey 07002
- Country: United States
- Website: hudsonreporter.com

The Hudson Reporter was a newspaper chain based in Hudson County, New Jersey mainly focused on local politics and community news. The oldest newspaper in the chain was the Hoboken Reporter, founded in 1983. The chain stopped publication on January 20, 2023. It has subsequently become an online newspaper owned and operated by Newspaper Media Group.

The company published eight weekly newspapers and three local lifestyle magazines. The Reporters covered news and features in Hoboken, Jersey City, North Bergen, Weehawken, Secaucus, West New York, Union City, and Guttenberg. In Bayonne it was known as Bayonne Community News. The lifestyle magazines covered Bayonne (Bayonne: Life on the Peninsula), Hoboken (07030), and Jersey City (Jersey City Magazine).

== History ==
The Hudson Reporter was founded in 1983 by Hoboken-based developer Joseph Barry, founder of the development company Applied Housing, who bought the weekly Hoboken Pictorial and its group of local newspapers. Its first newspaper was The Hoboken Reporter, which Barry published out of a small building in downtown Hoboken. It subsequently moved to a basement office on 14th Street. As Barry's real estate holdings in Hudson County grew throughout the 1980s, the organization bought a chain of local newspapers and consolidated them into a coordinated weekly paper group. In 1995 the chain moved to a large, historic bank building at 1400 Washington Street, across the street from the basement office. Lucha Malato joined the company in 1983 and David Unger in 1985. both becoming his minority partners. In 1987, the chain began The Secaucus Reporter. In addition to articles written by the reporting staff, the paper's letters-to-the-editor page spawned a book of letters, Yuppies Invade My House at Dinnertime, in 1987.

It eventually added similar papers as part of its Reporter brand for Jersey City, North Bergen, Weehawken, Union City, and West New York. The company purchased the Bayonne Community News in 2004 and relocated to Bayonne in 2016. In 1999, with the real estate market becoming even busier, Barry no longer had time to dedicate to the newspapers, and sold his majority share in the company to Malato and Unger.

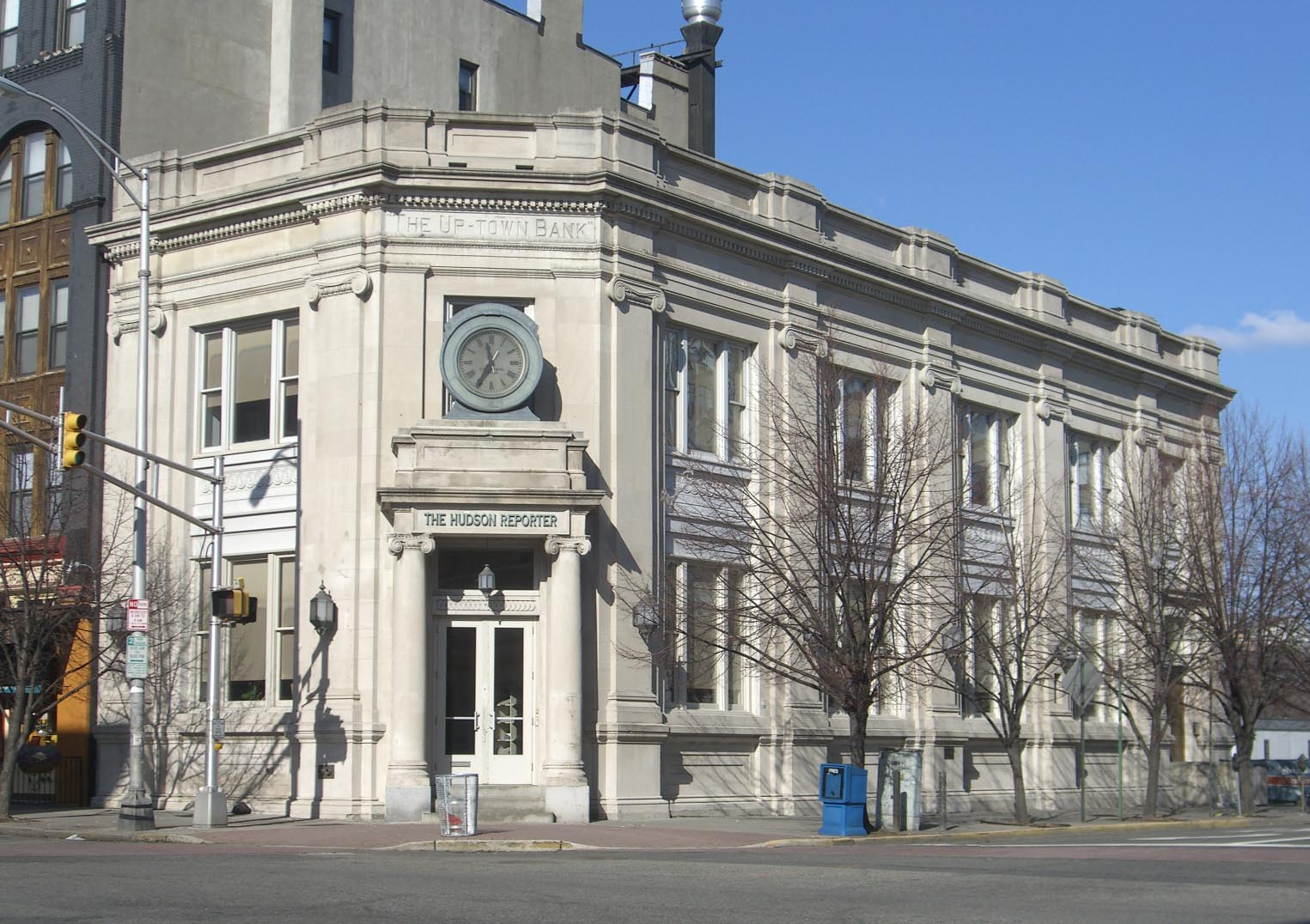
The building on the corner of 14th Street and Washington Street in Hoboken, that housed the Reporter from 1995 to June 2016

After both offices lost power during Hurricane Sandy in October/November 2012, the staff worked out of Palisades Medical Center.

In early June 2016, after 33 years in Hoboken, the paper moved its main office to 447 Broadway in Bayonne, three blocks from the 22nd Street Light Rail station. The consolidation of the staff at the new location also saw the closing of the small satellite office in Bayonne that published the Bayonne Community News for years. Among the reasons Malato cited for the move was the amount of unused space at the previous Hoboken location, such as the large darkroom that became obsolete since the staff's adoption of digital photography around 2000. The company continued using its distribution facility in North Bergen.

On June 10, 2018, it was announced that publishers Lucha Malato and David Unger had sold the Hudson Reporter Assoc. LP, the company that publishes their papers, to the Newspaper Media Group (NMG) of Cherry Hill, New Jersey, a publisher of more than 50 weekly community newspapers in Central and Southern New Jersey and Philadelphia, as well as a monthly newspaper on Staten Island. NMG owner and CEO Richard Donnelly stated, "The decision to purchase the Hudson Reporter was an easy one. The award-winning publications fit perfectly into our successful business model of community newspapers. Pooling resources and talent will ensure an even greater success story down the road. We are excited to add this exceptional group of papers to our growing family."

By June 2021, the company's headquarters had moved down further south to 166-168 Broadway.

On the afternoon of January 20, 2023, during the Hudson Reporter's staff's weekly editorial meeting, Media Group General's owners, speaking via a Zoom call, informed employees, including reporters, sales staff, and art staff, that the paper was ceasing operations that day. The announcement was a surprise to its staff (which included two reporters and one managing editor), who were informed by newspaper Media Group General Manager Brandon Chamberlain that the reason for the closure was that the revenue generated by the chain did not justify its expenses. Between five and ten staff members lost their jobs without severance pay. The closure affected both the print and online versions of the publications, according to reporter Daniel Israel, a three-year veteran of the chain, in a tweet posted on January 20, the staff's final day at work.

In February 2023, Newspaper Media Group sold the Hudson Reporter's web domain to an undisclosed buyer and the new owners began publishing articles to the site. Former staff reporters accused the outlet of posting articles written by Generative AI with bylines from people who don't exist. In April 2024, the Jersey City city council passed a resolution honoring the paper's legacy.

== Accolades ==
The chain and its writers have won numerous awards for investigative reporting, going beyond the norm for weekly newspapers. The company has become a training ground for reporters and writers in the New York area, having sent two to The New York Times, and several to other top publications including The Star-Ledger and news organizations like Associated Press.

Other writers, like Caren Matzner, have published novels.

== Publications ==
=== Newspapers ===
- Jersey City Reporter
- Hoboken Reporter
- Union City Reporter
- West New York Reporter
- Weehawken Reporter
- North Bergen Reporter
- Secaucus Reporter
- Bayonne Community News

=== Magazines and guides ===
- Jersey City Magazine, printed twice annually
- 07030, a magazine about Hoboken
- Bayonne: Life on the Peninsula
- Hudson Current, an arts and entertainment publication
- Gateway Guide, a quarterly New Jersey tourism magazine published until late 2006

== See also ==
- The Jersey Journal
- The Observer
- El Especialito
- List of newspapers in New Jersey
