= Jersey City Independent =

American hyperlocal newspaper

- Language: English
- City: Jersey City, Hudson County, New Jersey
- Country: United States

The Jersey City Independent is a hyperlocal online community news site covering Jersey City and surrounding municipalities in Hudson County, New Jersey. It also publishes JCI Magazine, a quarterly print magazine. The Jersey City Independent and JCI Magazine are owned and operated by Harmony Media NJ, LLC.

== Jersey City Independent ==
Jersey City Independent is a hyperlocal online news site covering community news, events, arts, culture and lifestyle in Jersey City. It was founded in 2008 by Jon Whiten and Shane Smith. In 2014 Harmony Media NJ, LLC purchased the Jersey City Independent. Harmony Media NJ, LLC is a locally owned and operated independent media company. Catherine Hecht is the owner of Harmony Media NJ, LLC and publisher of the Jersey City Independent. Jersey City Independent is a member of the New Jersey Press Association.

== JCI Magazine ==
JCI Magazine is a free quarterly print publication covering arts, culture, and lifestyle in Hudson County. Founded as NEW it was acquired by the Jersey City Independent in December 2009 and had its inaugural issue in April 2010. In 2013, NEW was renamed JCI. JCI Magazine is owned by Harmony Media NJ, LLC. Catherine Hecht is the owner of Harmony Media NJ, LLC and publisher of JCI Magazine.

== See also ==
- The Jersey Journal
- The Hudson Reporter
- River View Observer
- Jersey City Magazine
- NJ.com
