= Kyra Tirana Barry =

American wrestler

- Born: 1966 (age 59–60)
- Education: B.A. Columbia University
- Known for: Team Leader for U.S. Women's National wrestling team
- Spouse: David Barry
- Children: 3
- Family: Joseph Barry (father-in-law)

Kyra Tirana Barry (born 1966) is the Team Leader for United States Women's National wrestling team.

== Biography ==
In 1987, Barry earned a B.A. in Urban Studies from Columbia University where she also played soccer. After school, she worked mainly in transportation policy for the United States Congress, the Mayor's Office of New York City, the New York Metropolitan Transportation Authority, and New Jersey Department of Transportation. In 2013, she was named the Team Leader for the United States Women's National wrestling team. While team leader, individual US team women wrestlers won nine World medals - including two gold medals by Adeline Gray - and the USA team placed third in the 2013, 2014 and 2015 World Championships.

== Boardships and philanthropy ==
Barry is President of Beat the Streets which is dedicated to encouraging New York City middle and high school student-athletes to participate in amateur wrestling to build life skills; and created the first freestyle wrestling league for high school girls. She is also the Chair of the Columbia College Alumni Association, a member of the Columbia College Board of Visitors, Barry is a member of the U.S. Soccer Foundation's New York Leadership Council - which develops soccer programs for underprivileged children - and has served on the boards of All Saints Episcopal School, Hoboken and Village Community School.

== Personal life ==
Kyra and her husband, real estate developer David Barry (son of Joseph Barry) have three children: Olivia, Jake and Charley. Her husband served as Greco-Roman Team Leader during the 2009-2012 Olympic quadrennium and was named USA Wrestling Man of the Year in 2012. Her two sons are also wrestlers.
