= Joseph Barry =

American real estate developer

- Born: 1940 (age 85–86)
- Education: B.A. Rutgers University; J.D. Rutgers Law School
- Occupation: real estate developer
- Known for: --co-founder of Applied Housing Companies --founder of the Hudson Reporter
- Spouse: Gail Barry
- Children: David Barry; Michael Barry; Lisa Barry Fleisher
- Parent(s): Marion and Walter Barry
- Family: Kyra Tirana Barry (daughter-in-law)

Joseph Barry (born 1940) is an American real estate developer and co-founder of the Applied Housing Companies and founder of the Hudson Reporter newspaper chain.

== Early life ==
Joseph Barry was born in 1940 to a Jewish family in New Jersey and raised in Newark, the son of Marion and Walter Barry. His father was a union organizer for the United Electrical Workers who started to develop low income housing in Newark after the 1967 Newark riots. Barry earned a B.A. in English from Rutgers University and graduated first in his class from Rutgers Law School.

== Career ==
Barry served as a clerk to the United States Court of Appeals for the Third Circuit. In the 1960s, he was associated with the left-wing Students for Democratic Society. In 1970, Barry and his father founded the Applied Housing Company. In 1971, Hoboken designated Applied Housing as their exclusive developer of Section 8 housing tasked with rehabilitating deteriorated buildings into affordable housing. Applied focused on renovating the existing housing stock rather than clearance and rebuild; they also believed in careful maintenance and management thereafter to preserve the stock. During the 1970s, Applied built and renovated thousands of units of affordable housing throughout New Jersey with a concentration in Hoboken, North Bergen, and Bayonne. The firm was given a great deal of credit for Hoboken's rebirth. In 1979, his father retired and Joseph Barry became president. He re-focused the company on constructing market-rate and luxury housing with a particular concentration on the Hoboken and Jersey City waterfronts including the $150 million, 1,160-unit Shipyard Development Project on Hoboken's waterfront; the 1,650 unit waterfront condominium community Port Liberté in Jersey City; and the 42-story luxury Palisades rental residence in Fort Lee, New Jersey. In 2001, Barry pleaded guilty to making five cash payments totaling $114,900 to former County Executive Robert Janiszewski to secure state and federal funding for the Shipyard project. Barry resigned from Applied Housing and handed the management of the now $108 million in sales company over to his two sons. Admitting guilt, Barry stated: "I made a terrible mistake. I take responsibility for it, and will get on with my life." Barry was sentenced to 25 months in federal prison, ordered to make $1 million in restitution payments, and fined $20,000. By 2004, Applied was the largest developer in Hoboken.

In 1983, Barry also founded the Hudson Reporter newspaper chain. He established Reporter newspapers in six other Hudson County towns: Jersey City, Weehawken, Secaucus, Union City, West New York and North Bergen. In 1999, he sold his share in the chain to minority partners and co-publishers David Unger and Lucha Malato. Despite being semi-retired, Barry remains committed to the urban redevelopment volunteering his time via his LinX Redevelopment company to rebuilding New Jersey's run-down cities with his latest focus on Passaic, New Jersey.

== Personal life ==
Barry is married to Gail H. Barry and lives in Peapack-Gladstone. They have three children: David Barry, Michael Barry, and Lisa Barry Fleisher who continue to run the company and its sister company, the Ironstate Development Company. He has a net worth of $49,482,947 His son David is married to Kyra Tirana Barry, team leader for the U.S. Woman's Wrestling Team that competed in the 2016 Olympic Games.
