= That Was Yesterday (Foreigner song) =

Single by Foreigner

from the album Agent Provocateur
- B-side: "Two Different Worlds"
- Released: March 1985
- Recorded: early 1984
- Genre: Rock
- Length: 3:50 (single version); 6:23 (extended version)
- Label: Atlantic
- Songwriters: Lou Gramm, Mick Jones
- Producers: Alex Sadkin, Mick Jones

Foreigner singles chronology
"I Want to Know What Love Is" (1984)	"That Was Yesterday" (1985)	"Reaction to Action" (1985)

Music video
- "That Was Yesterday" on YouTube

"That Was Yesterday" is the second single taken from the album Agent Provocateur by the band Foreigner. This song was available in four versions, as a remixed single, an extended remix, an orchestral version, and the original mix. The song was written by Lou Gramm and Mick Jones, and the B-side "Two Different Worlds" is also of note for being the first solo-written Lou Gramm song to appear on a single.

The extended remix added additional lyrics to the intro, and these lyrics can also be heard in the live version from the DVD All Access Tonight - 25 - Live In Concert.

== Composition ==
Mick Jones explained that he draws much songwriting material from subconscious emotions from past relationships. He said "That Was Yesterday" "...is a song about a relationship that failed, which you're still clinging onto. You still feel that there's a chance to resurrect it. Some of these songs require really digging down deep, and sometimes they bring out very painful moments that you've had. A lot of the songs that I've written of that kind of emotion, they bring me to tears. They're painful to recall."

== Reception ==
AllMusic critic Bret Adams later called the song "a terrific hit single," citing its "catchy chorus" and "nifty synthesizer lick." Billboard described it as a "gothic ballad" and compared it to Foreigner's previous single "I Want to Know What Love Is" by stating that "That Was Yesterday" has "thrumming synths...rather than soaring choristers." Indianapolis Star critic Scott Miley said that it "adeptly reflect[s] despair with tantalizing synthesizers." Cash Box described it as a "mid-tempo rocker" and said "brooding and at times powerful, 'That Was Yesterday' takes a hard look at a lost romance and Lou Gramm's lead vocal is emotionally biting." Chicago Tribune writer Jan DeKnock made it a "Pick Hit" saying it likely won't perform as well as "I Want to Know What Love Is" because "its harder rock edge will keep it off some of the adult contemporary stations that made 'Love' such a big hit" but said that "That Was Yesterday" is "just the kind of good, solid mainstream rock that always finds a place on the charts." Gazette writer Chris Rubich called it a "song of love, longing and loss" that is enhanced by its "dreamlike instrumentals." Herald News writer Sean Daly regarded it as one of the "more forceful recordings" on Agent Provocateur. Ultimate Classic Rock critic Jeff Giles regarded "That Was Yesterday" as one of Foreigner's "better singles." Knight News Wire writer Rick Shefchik criticized the song as being "sludgy," whose primary audience is "late '20s to early '30s stockbrokers on cocaine."

Tri-City Herald critic Jim Angell praised the synthesizer playing. But The Daily News Journal music writer Curt Anderson criticized the fact that the slow keyboard buildup went nowhere, "as if the mere sound of a synthesizer is all the song needs."

Gramm disagreed with the decision to release "That Was Yesterday" as the second single from Agent Provocateur because that meant that the first two singles were ballads. Gramm stated "I always thought our rock songs upheld a tradition of good rock and roll and here we release two ballads in a row."

Jones regarded it as his favorite song from the album.

== Music video ==
A music video was created for "That Was Yesterday," directed by Jim Yukich. As with "I Want to Know What Love Is", the music video for "That Was Yesterday" is based on a live performance of the song. The video was filmed at the Birmingham-Jefferson Civic Center in Birmingham, Alabama. The band had intended the video for "That Was Yesterday" to be "flashier" than that for "I Want to Know What Love Is." Jones has stated that he was pleased with the "warmth" of the song in the video.

== Charts ==
The single reached #12 on the Billboard Hot 100 chart, and also reached #4 on the Billboard Mainstream Rock chart and #24 on the Adult Contemporary chart. It also reached the Top 40 on the UK singles chart (#28), the Netherlands (#19), Switzerland (#29) and Germany (#31).

=== Weekly charts ===
Chart (1985)	Peak position
Netherlands	19
Switzerland	29
Germany	31
Belgium	25
UK Singles Chart	28
U.S. Billboard Hot 100	12
U.S. Billboard Adult Contemporary	24
U.S. Billboard Album Rock Tracks	4
