= Growing Up the Hard Way =

"Growing Up The Hard Way"

Single by Foreigner

from the album Agent Provocateur
- B-side: "She's Too Tough"
- Released: September 1985
- Recorded: Early 1984
- Genre: Hard rock
- Length: 4:18 (album version); 3:32 (single version)
- Label: Atlantic
- Songwriters: Lou Gramm; Mick Jones
- Producers: Alex Sadkin; Mick Jones

Foreigner singles chronology
"Reaction to Action" (1985)	"Growing Up The Hard Way" (1985)	"Down on Love" (1985)

"Growing Up the Hard Way" is the fifth and final single taken from the album Agent Provocateur by the band Foreigner, and subsequently released only in Europe in September 1985. The song was written by Lou Gramm and Mick Jones, and the B-side, "She's Too Tough", a rock and roll Elvis Presley-type song, was also featured on the American single release of "Reaction to Action".
