= History of Lusophone Americans in Newark, New Jersey =

The city of Newark, New Jersey, includes a large Portuguese-speaking population. Newark has been nicknamed "Little Portugal" due to its large number of Portuguese-speaking and Portuguese-descended people. Most Lusophone Americans in Newark live in the working-class neighborhood of Ironbound.

In addition to immigrants from Portugal, Newark also has a large population of immigrants from Brazil and Cape Verde and to a lesser extent Angola.

== History ==
The first Portuguese immigrants to Newark came during the early 1900s and the greatest influx of Portuguese was during the 1950s.

Despite there being very little immigration from Portugal in the 21st-century, there are still many Portuguese-speaking immigrants settling in the city and its surrounding area. Today, most Lusophone immigrants arrive from Brazil and Portuguese-speaking Africa, especially Cape Verde and Mozambique. Another place of origin is Galicia, a region of Spain where Galician (also known as Gallego) is the spoken language. Gallego it is also known as old-Portuguese because it is the ancestor of modern Portuguese.

== Demographics ==
In 1995, there were 30,000 Luso-Americans living in Newark.

2022 ACS data showed that Essex county had 13,729 residents of Portuguese ancestry (1.62% of the population), while an additional 14,966 (1.76% of the total) were of Brazilian ancestry and 787 were of Cape Verdean descent. In total, 3.47% of the population had its origins in these three Portuguese-speaking countries as of 2022. In the whole of New Jersey around 76,013 people were reported being of Portuguese descent, 1,166 of Cape Verdean and 51,266 of Brazilian ancestry. Of the 128,445 people (1.39% of the population) whose origins lied in the three aforementioned countries, 22.95% lived in Essex county.

== Culture ==
Augusto Amador, of Portuguese ancestry, was a member of the Municipal Council of Newark representing East Ward for 24 years. He assumed office on July 1, 1998, and was consistently re-elected until he left office on June 30, 2022.

Ferry Street is the major thorofare in the Ironbound, which begins a Peter Francisco Park near Newark Penn Station. The Portugal Day Festival in Newark an annual event. The Brazilian Press is based in neighborhood.

The Portugal Ministry of Foreign Affairs maintains the consulate in the city.

== See also ==
- Cape Verdean Americans
- Newark Portuguese
- Bissau-Guinean Americans
