= Renna Media =

New Jersey newspaper publisher

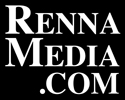
- logo
- Founded: January 19, 2021; 4 years ago
- Founders: Joe Renna; Tina Renna
- Country of origin: United States
- Headquarters location: 202 Walnut Ave, Cranford New Jersey
- Distribution: 200,000
- Nonfiction topics: Local news
- Revenue: $1M
- No. of employees: 2
- Official website: www.rennamedia.com

Renna Media is an American publishing company based in Cranford, New Jersey, that owns and publishes various local newspapers in Union County and neighboring parts of Essex, Morris, and Somerset counties.

== History ==
The company is owned and managed by Joe Renna and his wife Tina Renna. The company has grown around their first newspaper Around About Peterstown which they founded in 1998. They've expanded their business model to neighboring towns, with the media company, which was founded on January 29, 2021, acting as an umbrella for their various holdings. The company specializes in what they call "Hyper-Local news" and have a self reported monthly circulation of 200,000 copies of their 30 newspapers. The newspapers are free of charge and financed by advertisements locked at a $100 maximum per edition. The company seeks to provide news on local topics, be it local elections, library developments and town hall meetings, while also giving local residents and businesses a platform to share information and commercial ventures. Due to their platform, the company has been involved in changes to local school systems, including the Thinking Classrooms concept supported by Governor Phil Murphy, which seeks to phase out traditional mathematics teaching, as well as support for non-electronic extracurricular activities in elementary schools.

== Properties ==
Newspapers published by Renna Media include:

- Around About Peterstown
- Berkeley Heights Community News
- The Chathams
- Clark Monthly
- Cranford Monthly
- Elizabeth – Elmora Hills
- Fanwood Post
- Florham Park Press
- Garwood Times
- Green Brook Gazette
- Kenilworth Life
- Life In Linden
- Long Hill Leader
- Madison Monthly
- Mountainside View
- New Providence News
- Our Town Rahway
- Roselle Park Monthly
- Scotch Plains Monthly
- Millburn Short Hills Monthly
- Summit Times
- Spirit of Union
- Warren Monthly
- Watchung Post
- Westfield Monthly

== See also ==
- List of newspapers in New Jersey
