= NJ.com =

Website for local news from New Jersey

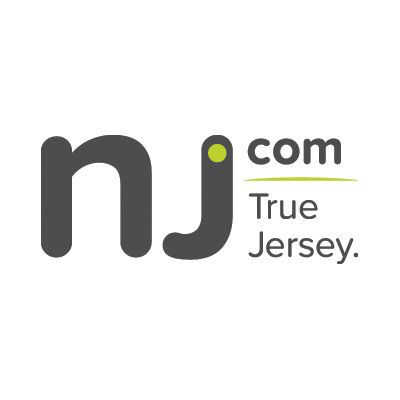
- NJ.com's logo since 2013
- Website type: News
- Available in: English
- Headquarters: Iselin, New Jersey, U.S.
- Owner: Advance Publications
- Website: nj.com
- Commercial: Yes

NJ.com is a digital news content provider and website in New Jersey owned by Advance Publications. According to The New York Times in 2012, it was the largest provider of digital news in the state at the time. In 2018, comScore reports that NJ.com has an average of 12.1 million unique monthly visitors consuming a total of 70 million pageviews per month.

NJ.com covers news in the Lehigh Valley region of eastern Pennsylvania and throughout New Jersey, and advertises itself as "the number one provider of local news in New Jersey and the Lehigh Valley."

== History ==
Content on NJ.com is provided by NJ Advance Media, a company launched in June 2014 to provide content, sales and marketing services to NJ.com and Advance's New Jersey–based newspapers, including The Star-Ledger, The Times of Trenton, the South Jersey Times, The Hunterdon County Democrat, The Star-Gazette, The Warren Reporter, The Suburban News, Hoboken Now, Ledger Local, Ledger Somerset Observer, The Star-Gazette, and The Washington Township Times. It is owned by Advance Local, an organization that operates ten local news and information sites in the United States.

The site was ranked by Alexa as 2,712th worldwide and 661st in the U.S. in May 2016. NJ.com's news reports have been quoted by other news publications such as the New York Daily News, the Chicago Tribune, The Washington Post. In 2019, NJ Advance Media's Steve Politi was named the nation's top sports columnist by the Associated Press Sports Editors.

NJ.com is part of a general trend away from printed newspapers towards digital content. A report in USA Today in 2012 suggested that many newspaper readers were moving to digital websites such as NJ.com for local news. In 2018, Steve Alessi became NJ Advance Media, leading the NJ.com operation when Matt Kraner was promoted to COO of the newly formed Advance Local.

In 2016, its editors called on Governor Chris Christie to resign from office, after a failed presidential campaign and Christie's controversial endorsement of Republican presidential frontrunner Donald Trump. Advance Publications is owned by the Newhouse family. According to a report in 2014, NJ.com was laying off some employees, although there were reports that staffing losses were being offset by hiring at NJ Advance Media.

== See also ==
- List of newspapers in New Jersey
