= Agent Provocateur (album) =

Studio album by Foreigner
- Released: December 14, 1984
- Recorded: October 1983−July 1984
- Studios: The Hit Factory and Right Track Recording (New York, NY)
- Genre: Rock
- Length: 42:17
- Label: Atlantic
- Producer: Mick Jones: Alex Sadkin

Foreigner chronology
Records (1982)	Agent Provocateur (1984)	Inside Information (1987)

Singles from Agent Provocateur
- 1. "I Want to Know What Love Is" Released: November 1984; 2. "That Was Yesterday" Released: March 1985; 3. "Reaction to Action" Released: May 1985; 4. "Down on Love" Released: August 1985; 5. "Growing Up the Hard Way" Released: September 1985 (EU)

Agent Provocateur is the fifth studio album by the British-American rock band Foreigner, released on December 14, 1984. The album was the band's only number-one album on the United Kingdom Albums Chart, and it reached the top five on the United States Billboard 200. Although album sales were lower than their previous work in the US, it contains the band's biggest hit single, "I Want to Know What Love Is", which is their only #1 single on the UK singles chart and the US Billboard Hot 100, staying at the top spot for three and two weeks, respectively. The follow-up single, "That Was Yesterday", also proved to be a sizeable hit, peaking at #12 in the US. The album was certified Platinum in the UK by the BPI, and triple Platinum in the US by the RIAA.

== Recording ==
Within nearly two years of releasing 4, writing and preproduction for this album began as early as June 1983 in New York, with producer Trevor Horn. Then, once writing had been completed, official recording began in early October in New York with Horn. Eventually, things fell apart around Christmas that year when Foreigner had joined him in England to resume the recording: Horn soon backed out of the project, feeling that he and the band were heading in different directions and that it was not going to work out. However, it was also acknowledged that Horn chose to work with Frankie Goes To Hollywood on the follow-up single to Relax. In hindsight, the band recognised that Horn's production style wasn't really suited to their music, according to drummer Dennis Elliott: "he tried to make us more electronic than we wanted to be". Eventually, another month was spent trying to look for another producer to fill his shoes, subsequently hiring Alex Sadkin, who was busy finishing the Thompson Twins' Into the Gap album. Sadkin helped rekindle the project when it was on the verge of total collapse, but despite that, according to Jones, recording still never seemed to end: the sessions had been dogged from the very start and continued to remain unfocused. Sadkin agreed when reminiscing on the project in 1987:

"The Foreigner project a couple years back, on the other hand, just seemed to go on and on. Everyone, including the band, got really pissed off with it. They're used to it, though, and I wasn't, so it just threw me. I couldn't believe what was going on! There was a problem with people not coming in; Mick (Jones), who is the leader, not showing up for hours and hours, and so that obviously would really slow it down. Then the songs wouldn't be really ready. While the album was being mixed the lyrics were still being written! Things were being changed right up to the last minute, and that is what took a long time. That is why I don't want to go into the studio when somebody wants to write the stuff there; it just takes too long and it isn't worth it, it doesn't come out right. You can't write properly in the studio because you're under pressure. How can you really be creative when you're watching the clock going round burning up the money?"

Even though the extent of Horn's contributions to the record is unclear, he claims to have done most of the backing tracks, including for "I Want To Know What Love Is". According to singer Lou Gramm, owing to the difference in production styles between Sadkin and Horn, only two of the tracks that had been cut with the latter were kept on the record, though it is unclear which ones. A total of nine months had been spent on recording the album.

== Critical reception ==
Professional ratings
Review scores
Source	Rating
AllMusic	3/5 stars
The Rolling Stone Album Guide	3.5/5 stars

By the time of Agent Provocateur, Foreigner was frequently savaged by the contemporary rock music press. A review in Creem read: "On this, their latest excursion into the gaping jaws of pulverizing mediocrity, our boys continue to wrestle with an all-too-turgid identity crisis — they still can't decide whether it's stupider to aspire to poor man's Led Zep status or settle for being a weightier version of Chicago. Some swinging choice, huh? Either way they lose and this record is simply jammed with one dull defeat after another."

Ultimate Classic Rock critic Eduardo Rivadavia rated "A Love in Vain" as Foreigner's fifth-most underrated song, calling it a "synth-powered cry of desperation" and a "dark-horse favorite of fans."

Classic Rock critic Malcolm Dome rated two songs from Agent Provocateur as being among Foreigner's 10 most underrated – "Stranger in My Own House" at #6 and "Tooth and Nail" – which he describes as "the antidote to 'I Want to Know What Love Is'" – at #2.

Billboard said that in "Tooth and Nail" the band flex "post-punk power chords with gusto."

== Track listing ==
All tracks are written by Mick Jones and Lou Gramm, except where noted.

Side one
No.	Title	Writer(s)	Length
1.	"Tooth and Nail"		3:54
2.	"That Was Yesterday"		3:46
3.	"I Want to Know What Love Is"	Jones	4:58
4.	"Growing Up the Hard Way"		4:18
5.	"Reaction to Action"		3:57

Side two
No.	Title	Writer(s)	Length
6.	"Stranger in My Own House"	Jones	4:54
7.	"A Love in Vain"		4:12
8.	"Down on Love"		4:08
9.	"Two Different Worlds"	Gramm	4:28
10.	"She's Too Tough"		3:07
Total length:			42:17

== Personnel ==
Foreigner

- Lou Gramm – lead vocals, percussion
- Mick Jones – guitars, bass, keyboards, synthesizers, backing vocals
- Rick Wills – bass, backing vocals
- Dennis Elliott – drums

Additional personnel

- Wally Badarou – analogue and digital synthesizers
- Tom Bailey – synthesizers on "I Want to Know What Love Is"
- Brian Eddolls – synthesizers
- Larry Fast – synthesizers
- Dave Lebolt – synthesizers
- Bob Mayo – keyboards, acoustic piano, backing vocals
- Jack Waldman – synthesizers
- Mark Rivera – saxophone, backing vocals
- Thompson Twins – backing vocals
- Ian Lloyd – guitar, keyboards, backing vocals
- Don Harper – violin on "I Want to Know What Love Is"
- Jennifer Holliday – backing vocals and arrangement on "I Want to Know What Love Is"
- New Jersey Mass Choir of the GMWA – backing vocals on "I Want to Know What Love Is"

== Production ==
- Producers – Mick Jones and Alex Sadkin
- Chief Engineer/Mixing Engineer – Frank Filipetti
- Additional Engineers – Josh Abbey, Larry Alexander, Jason Corsaro, Joe Ferla and Howie Lindeman.
- Assistant Engineers – Bobby Cohen, Tim Crich and Scott Mabuchi.
- Original Mastering and Digital Remastering – Ted Jensen at Sterling Sound, NYC.
- Art Direction and Design – Bob Defrin
- Management – Bud Prager, E.S.P. Management Ltd.

== Charts ==
=== Weekly charts ===
Chart (1984–1985)	Peak position
Australia (Kent Music Report)	2
Austrian Albums (Ö3 Austria)	10
Canada Top Albums/CDs (RPM)	3
Dutch Albums (Album Top 100)	12
Finnish Albums (The Official Finnish Charts)	5
French Albums (SNEP)	15
German Albums (Offizielle Top 100)	1
Italian Albums (Musica e Dischi)	20
Japanese Albums (Oricon)	6
New Zealand Albums (RMNZ)	4
Norwegian Albums (VG-lista)	1
Swedish Albums (Sverigetopplistan)	1
Swiss Albums (Schweizer Hitparade)	1
UK Albums (Official Charts)	1
US Billboard 200	4

=== Year-end charts ===
Chart (1985)	Position
New Zealand Albums (RMNZ)	34

== Certifications ==
Album certifications for Agent Provocateur
Region	Certification	Certified units/sales
France (SNEP)	Gold	100,000^{*}
Germany (BVMI)	Platinum	500,000^{^}
New Zealand (RMNZ)	Gold	7,500^{^}
Switzerland (IFPI Switzerland)	Platinum	50,000^{^}
United Kingdom (BPI)	Platinum	300,000^{^}
United States (RIAA)	3× Platinum	3,000,000^{^}
^{*} Sales figures based on certification alone.^{^} Shipments figures based on certification alone.
