= El Especialito =

Weekly newspaper magazine in Spanish language

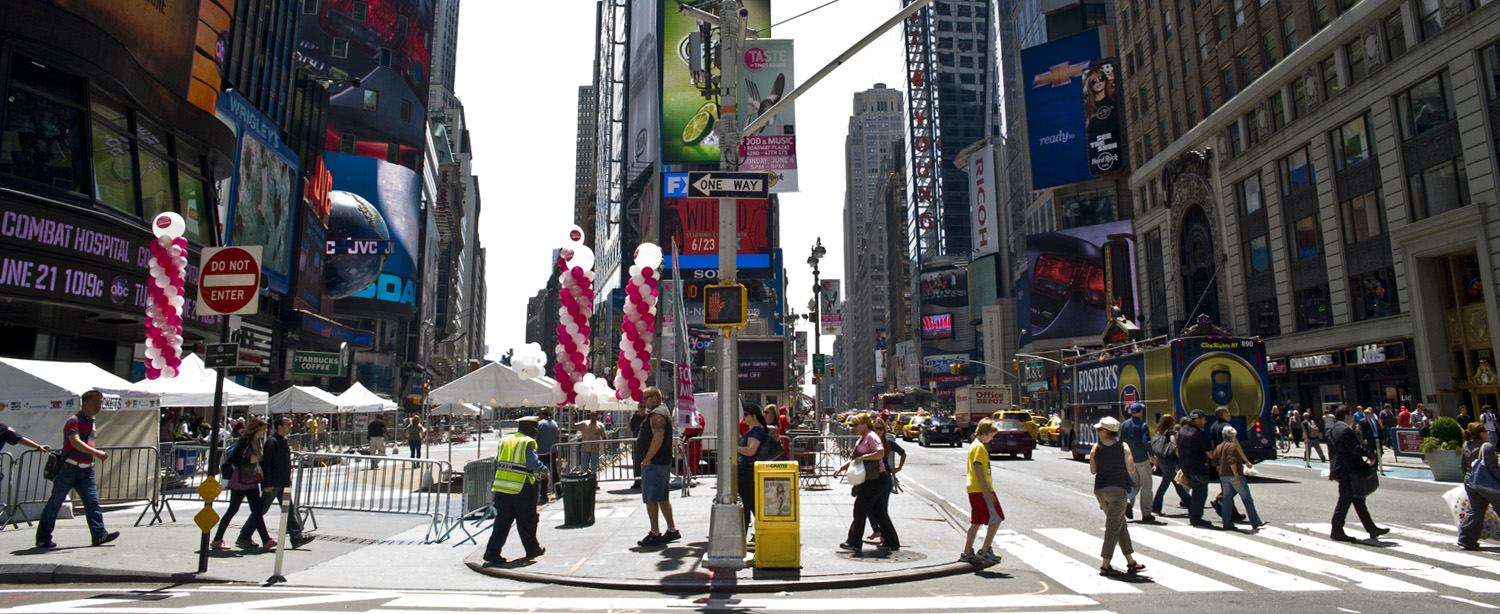
- El Especialito box in Times Square (2014)
- Type: Weekly newspaper
- Owner: Ibarria Media Group
- Founder: Antonio Ibarria
- Founded: 1985
- Language: Spanish
- Headquarters: 3510 Bergenline Avenue; Union City, New Jersey
- Country: United States
- Circulation: 270,000 (as of 2015)
- Website: elespecial.com

El Especialito is a free Spanish language weekly newspaper magazine, which was originally published under the name of El Especial in the 1980s and renamed in the 1990s. It was founded by Cuban American entrepreneur Antonio Ibarria and is distributed by United States Distributions Inc in northeastern New Jersey, New York City and Miami.

El Especialito is distributed to more than 5,500 yellow news racks in thirteen independent zones. With a weekly publication of 250,000 copies reaching more than one million readers, it the largest Hispanic weekly in the US.

El Especialito is part of Ibarria Media Group, which employs ninety employees and operates as family business run by Ibarria and his two sons, Anthony and John. The group also publishes the paid weeklies El Especial NY/NJ and El Especial Miami, as well as the celebrity newspaper Personalidades. Ibarria has been commended for his contributions to the community of Hispanics, including having a street named for him.

== See also ==
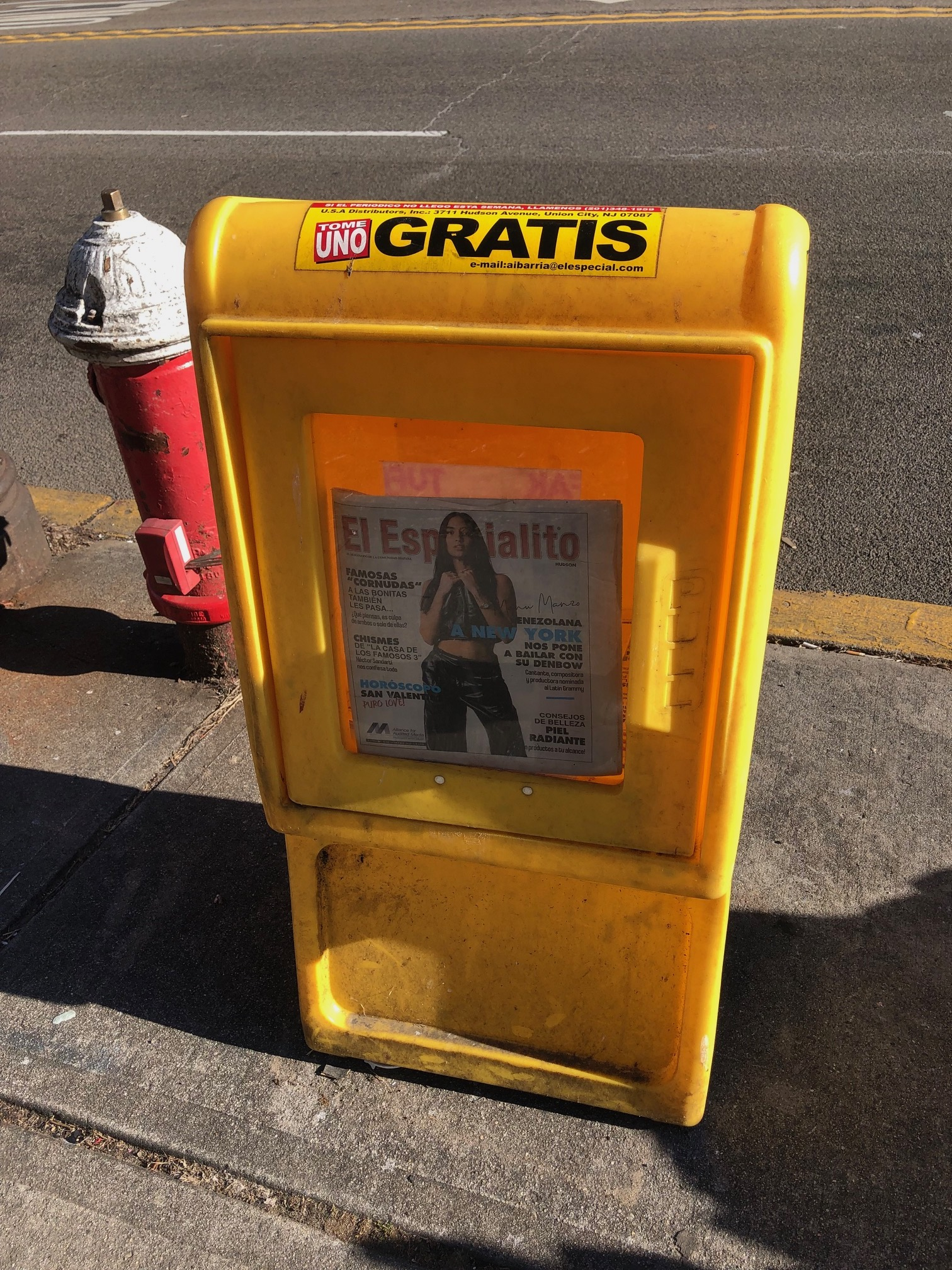
Stand New Jersey

- List of newspapers in New Jersey
- List of Spanish-language newspapers published in the United States
- Havana on the Hudson
- Media in New York City
- El Diario La Prensa
