= Home News Tribune =

Newspaper published in East Brunswick, New Jersey

- Type: Daily newspaper
- Owner: USA Today Co.
- Founded: 1879
- Headquarters: 92 East Main St., Suite 202; Somerville, New Jersey 08876
- City: New Brunswick, New Jersey
- Country: United States; 40.566948°N 74.608908°W
- Circulation: 2,144 (as of 2024)
- OCLC number: 13854028
- Website: mycentraljersey.com

The Central New Jersey Home News Tribune is a daily newspaper serving Middlesex County, New Jersey. The paper has an average daily weekday circulation of about 49,000. The newspaper is the result of the 1995 merger of The Home News of East Brunswick (founded 1879) and The News Tribune of Woodbridge Township. The News Tribune was previously known as The Perth Amboy Evening News. The combined paper, initially renamed the Home News & Tribune before the ampersand was removed, was sold to Gannett in 1997.

In 2009, some production operations were moved and consolidated with those of Central Jersey Gannett newspapers. Those operations are now located in Neptune. The newsroom and advertising departments remained in East Brunswick at the time but have since been relocated to Somerville, where its sister paper, the Courier News of Somerville, is headquartered. The two papers share much of the same content.

== History ==
The Home News was originally headquartered in New Brunswick. When operating in the southwestern industrial section of the city, the road on which it was located was named "Home News Row" and retains the name today.

Paul C. Grzella is the current general manager of the Home News Tribune and the Courier News in Somerville, New Jersey.

== See also ==
- List of newspapers in New Jersey
