= New Jersey Monitor =

New Jersey newspaper active in 1879

New Jersey Monitor Westfield Monitor
- Founder: Sydney Genung
- Editor: Sydney Genung
- Founded: 1879
- Ceased publication: 1879, 1885
- Relaunched: 1880
- Political alignment: Non-partisan
- Language: English
- City: Millburn, Westfield
- Country: United States
- OCLC number: 11980851

The New Jersey Monitor was a Millburn, New Jersey newspaper in independent operation in 1879, with its editor opening the Westfield Monitor the following year, the first weekly newspaper in Westfield, New Jersey.

== History ==
The New Jersey Monitor was the name of a short-lived newspaper in Millburn that was only in existence in 1879. The paper was established by Sydney Genung a journalist-entrepreneur based out of Madison. The newspaper shut down the same year it was opened, with Genung opening the Westfield Monitor in 1880. The newspaper was centered around local "news and politics" with an editorial stance aimed at fair coverage. The newspaper never gained significant traction due to the near monopoly that the Millburn Budget had on the city's audience, as well as financial shortcomings due to the Long Depression.

The Westfield Monitor operated from 1880 to 1885 and is notable for being the first weekly newspaper published in Westfield and mostly reported on local issues, and acted as a booster of the town. By 1885 the newspaper was usurped by the Westfield Telegraph, with the town's small population (~875 in 1885) discouraging rival newspapers.
