= Brazilian Press =

- Founder: Silvio De Souza
- President: Silvio De Souza
- Founded: 1997; 29 years ago
- Language: Portuguese
- City: Newark, New Jersey
- Country: United States
- Website: www.brazilianpress.com

Brazilian Press is a Brazilian, Portuguese language newspaper in the United States, with the largest circulation of any US Brazilian newspaper in 11 states. Their offices are at 78 Fillmore St, in the Ironbound neighborhood of Newark, New Jersey. This neighborhood has a strong Portuguese and Brazilian community.

== History and current management ==
The President, Silvio De Souza, founded the company in 1997. His wife, Daniele De Souza, is a supervisor at the company.
