= Hunterdon County Democrat =

Weekly newspaper based in New Jersey

The Hunterdon County Democrat
- Type: Weekly newspaper
- Owner: Advance Publications
- Founded: 1838
- Language: American English
- Headquarters: Raritan Township, New Jersey
- City: Flemington, New Jersey
- Country: United States
- Circulation: 21,000 (as of 2008)
- ISSN: 0018-7844
- OCLC number: 4094634
- Website: www.nj.com/hunterdon-county-democrat/

The Hunterdon County Democrat is a weekly newspaper that serves Hunterdon County, New Jersey. Currently owned by Penn Jersey Advance, Inc., its offices are in Raritan Township. It is one of the largest paid weekly newspapers in New Jersey, with an estimated total circulation of more than 21,000. It is published every Thursday.

== History ==
The first newspaper to serve Hunterdon County was the Hunterdon Gazette and Farmers' Weekly Advertiser, established at Flemington on March 24, 1825, by Charles George, who shortened the paper's title to the Hunterdon Gazette in 1829. He discontinued the Gazette on May 2, 1832, but retained his shop in Flemington and periodically published issues of the paper. George sold the Gazette to John S. Brown, who returned the paper to weekly publication beginning with his first issue, published on July 18, 1838.

On the Gazette's editorial page, Brown state that he was "'an old-fashioned Democrat,' which was in reality an admission that he was a Whig and opposed to the Jacksonian administration." While the Gazette retained a strong readership among Whigs and independents, Hunterdon County had become Democratic with the election of Andrew Jackson as president in 1828.

In 1838, the same year that Brown bought the Gazette, a rival newspaper appeared under the name Hunterdon Democrat. The Democrat's editor, George C. Seymour, ensured that his newspaper held to the principles of the Democratic Party. Within months, the rival editors began making personal attacks on each other in addition to their sniping on political topics. However, it "took more than politics to support a newspaper. The fight between Brown and Seymour was essentially one of trying to win readers and advertisers."

In 1843, Brown sold the Gazette to John R. Swallow. The new owner hired Henry C. Buffington as editor. Earlier in his career, Huffington had worked at Philadelphia area newspapers with Seymour, the Democrat's owner and editor. "Seymour did not welcome his old colleague to Flemington" and within months he initiated a new personal feud. Early in 1844, Swallow sold the Gazette to Buffington, then moved to Lambertville where he started a newspaper. This venture lasted only three or four years before Swallow sold out and headed west.

"In the meantime, Seymour of the Hunterdon Democrat and Buffington of the Hunterdon Gazettepursued their respective ways without much change or improvement. ... Actually, both editors were probably skating on thin financial ice at all times."

In 1852 Seymour sold the Democrat to Adam Bellis, also a staunch Democrat.

On July 3, 1867, The Hunterdon County Democrat made its debut, taking the place of both The Hunterdon Democrat and the erstwhile Gazette (which had changed its name to The Democrat after having been transformed into a Democratic paper in 1866). The editor during this time was Robert J. Killgore. His son, Anthony Killgore, later took over the editorship, serving until 1922. Alex L. Moreau and D. Howard Moreau then became the owners of The Democrat. Following the death of A.L. Moreau in 1933, D. Howard Moreau became sole owner of the newspaper, until his death on June 7, 1963. After Moreau's death his son-in-law H. Seely Thomas Jr. became publisher of The Democrat. Thomas hired Edward J. Mack as editor of the newspaper in 1965.

Family ownership continued in the 1980s when Thomas was joined in the publication of the newspaper by his three children, Catherine, John, and Howard. Catherine's husband, Jay Langley, became editor in 1988, while Mack rejoined the newspaper in 1989 as general manager. Catherine Langley succeeded her father as publisher after his death in 1994.

In February 2001, Penn Jersey Advance, Inc., a unit of Advance Publications (Newhouse), bought The Democrat and its sister publications. Based in Somerville, New Jersey, Penn Jersey Advance is the parent company of NJN Publishing, a network of newspapers in New Jersey and Pennsylvania.

On January 30, 2025, the paper ceased its print edition and went online-only.

== Sister publications ==
The Democrat purchased The Frenchtown Star in 1932, which had been published in Frenchtown since 1879, and renamed it The Delaware Valley News. In 1949 The Milford Leader was also purchased and combined with The Delaware Valley News. The newspaper was shut down in September 2008.

The Democrat launched a free-circulation weekly newspaper, The Hunterdon Observer, in August 1987. Another free weekly, The Warren Reporter, formerly served Warren County. A monthly magazine, Horse News, is also a member of The Democrat's publishing group. Penn Jersey Advance bought The Delaware Valley News, The Hunterdon Observer, The Warren Reporter, and Horse News in its 2001 acquisition of The Democrat.
