= I Want to Know What Love Is =

1984 song by Foreigner

- Picture sleeve for some European releases

Single by Foreigner

from the album Agent Provocateur
- B-side: "Street Thunder (Marathon Theme)"
- Released: November 21, 1984
- Recorded: December 1983
- Genre: Soft rock
- Length: 4:58 (7-inch version); 6:23 (12-inch extended)
- Label: Atlantic
- Songwriter: Mick Jones
- Producers: Mick Jones; Alex Sadkin

Foreigner singles chronology
"Luanne" (1982)	"I Want to Know What Love Is" (1984)	"That Was Yesterday" (1985)

Music video
- "I Want to Know What Love Is" on YouTube

"I Want to Know What Love Is" is a song by the British-American rock band Foreigner. The power ballad was released in November 1984 as the lead single from their fifth album, Agent Provocateur. The song reached number one on both the United Kingdom singles chart and the United States Billboard Hot 100 and is the group's biggest hit.

"I Want to Know What Love Is" remains one of Foreigner's best-known songs and most enduring radio hits, charting in the top 25 in 2000, 2001, and 2002 on the Billboard Hot Adult Contemporary Recurrents chart. The song has continued to garner critical acclaim, and is listed as one of Rolling Stone magazine's greatest songs of all time at number 476 in 2004 and at number 479 in 2010.

== Song information ==
I always worked late at night, when everybody left and the phone stopped ringing. "I Want to Know What Love Is" came up at three in the morning sometime in 1984. I don't know where it came from. I consider it a gift that was sent through me. I think there was something bigger than me behind it. I'd say it was probably written entirely by a higher force.

— Mick Jones

"I Want to Know What Love Is" was the first single released from Foreigner's album Agent Provocateur (1984). It is credited to Mick Jones, although former Foreigner frontman Lou Gramm asserts that he contributed to the song and should be credited to its creation (somewhere between 5% according to Jones and 35% according to Gramm). Despite Gramm's claims, Foreigner's then-bassist Rick Wills states that "I Want to Know What Love Is" was solely written by Jones. It was produced by Jones and Alex Sadkin. The song features backing vocals from the New Jersey Mass Choir affiliated with the Gospel Music Workshop of America, Dreamgirls star Jennifer Holliday, and featured keyboard work by Thompson Twins frontman Tom Bailey. The choir also appears in the song's music video, directed by Brian Gibson.

"[Jones'] home was about 15 minutes from my home," Gramm recalled. "So I would drive over to his house and we would work on that song. There'd be moments where it was just magic and then we'd hit our head on something creatively that we couldn't get to the next point. And so we almost had to put the song away for a couple of weeks and come back to it again. I felt we had worked our tails off to make that song what it is ... When it was time to decide what the percentages were, I wrote down what I thought it should be and he wrote down what he thought it should be. I think I wrote down 65–35—35 for me, 65 for him. And I opened the little piece of paper that [had] what he thought [the correct split] was, and he wrote down 95–5. I was so stunned and crushed that he'd think I contributed next to nothing to that song ... And you know what I told him after 95-5? I said, 'Five, Mick?' I said, 'You should just keep it all.' And he did. He didn't say, 'No, Lou. Please. Let's work it out.' I said, 'Five percent for me after all the work I did on the song?' I said, 'You should just keep it all.' And he didn't say anything. He just kept it all."

— Lou Gramm

According to Gramm, Jones was originally reluctant to let Gramm hear his initial rough version of the song. Gramm speculated that the song was emotional to Jones because it "represented things in his own life that he hadn't been able to resolve, and he wasn't too sure he wanted to have millions of people hear about it".

Cash Box reviewed the single, calling it "a highly dramatic and ultimately very touching song which amply displays Foreigner's musical talents and versatility." Cash Box specifically praised the band's performances, especially that of lead singer Gramm, who they said "delivers a moving and personal quality which captures the essence of the lyrics. Billboard said that the "dramatic mood piece grows out of quiet introspection into a full-blown production number with choir."

"I Want to Know What Love Is" reached number one on the UK Singles Chart on January 15, 1985, displacing Band Aid's "Do They Know It's Christmas?", staying there for three weeks, and knocked Madonna's long-running "Like a Virgin" out of number one on the Billboard Hot 100 on February 2, 1985. It was Foreigner's first and only pop chart-topper in either country, although the band had four number one Mainstream Rock hits and a number one adult contemporary radio hit in the US. This was the band's third of four number one singles on the Mainstream Rock chart. The song spent five weeks at number one in Australia and also hit the top of the charts in Canada, Ireland, New Zealand, Norway and Sweden, while peaking at number two in Switzerland and South Africa.

The song has received positive retrospective reviews from critics, with Bret Adams of AllMusic writing: "It's not hard to see why it became Foreigner's first number one single. Its dreamy, hypnotic feel is due in part to Lou Gramm's soulful lead vocals and the New Jersey Mass Choir's background vocals."

The song was also issued as a 12-inch single with a longer running time of 6:23. This version contains a slightly longer intro and an extended vocal chorus/fadeout ending. The single's B-side, "Street Thunder (Marathon Theme)," is an instrumental track originally appearing on The Official Music of the XXIII Olympiad – Los Angeles 1984 and later on the band's two-CD compilation Jukebox Heroes: The Foreigner Anthology (2000).

Soon after Foreigner's single topped the charts, the New Jersey Mass Choir released its own similar-sounding version of the song on an album also titled I Want to Know What Love Is. The choir's single peaked at number 37 on the then-Hot Black Singles chart and number 12 on the Hot Dance Music/Maxi-Singles Sales chart.

"I Want to Know What Love Is" was ranked as the number four Billboard Hot 100 single of 1985. It was the band's third platinum single in the US and their first and only gold single in the UK. It was certified double-platinum in the UK in 2023.

Jones has rated it as one of his 11 favorite Foreigner songs.

Originally consisting of three verses, a pre-chorus and a chorus, the song was extended with a bridge written by original songwriter Mick Jones specifically for Tina Arena's cover in 1998.

Musician Mark Ronson has claimed that Jones wrote the song for his mother, Ann Dexter-Jones.

In 2025, the band with current lead vocalist Luis Maldonado released a Spanish-language version of the song titled "Quiero Saber Si es Amor", featuring guest vocalist Joy Huerta.

== Personnel ==
Foreigner

- Lou Gramm – lead vocals
- Mick Jones – backing vocals, keyboards, synthesizers
- Rick Wills – backing vocals, bass
- Dennis Elliott – drums

Additional musicians

- Tom Bailey – synthesizers
- Don Harper – backing vocals
- Jennifer Holliday – backing vocals and backing vocal arrangements
- New Jersey Mass Choir of the GMWA – backing vocals

Production

- Mick Jones – producer
- Alex Sadkin – producer
- Frank Filipetti – mixing

== Charts ==
=== Weekly charts ===
Chart (1985)	Peak position
Australia (Kent Music Report)	1
Austria (Ö3 Austria Top 40)	7
Belgium (Ultratop 50 Flanders)	6
Belgium (VRT Top 30 Flanders)	7
Canada (CHUM)	1
Canada Retail Singles (The Record)	1
Canada Top Singles (RPM)	1
Canada Adult Contemporary (RPM)	9
Finland (Finnish Singles Chart)	7
France (SNEP)	18
Ireland (IRMA)	1
Italy (Musica e dischi)	24
Netherlands (Dutch Top 40)	6
Netherlands (Single Top 100)	5
New Zealand (Recorded Music NZ)	1
Norway (VG-lista)	1
Portugal (AFP)	2
Puerto Rico	1
South Africa (Springbok Radio)	2
Spain (AFYVE)	8
Sweden (Sverigetopplistan)	1
Switzerland (Schweizer Hitparade)	2
UK Singles (Official Charts)	1
US Billboard Hot 100	1
US Mainstream Rock Airplay (Billboard)	1
US Adult Contemporary (Billboard)	3
US Hot Black Singles (Billboard)	85
US Cash Box Top 100	1
West Germany (GfK)	3

Chart (2021)	Peak position
Poland Airplay (ZPAV)	96

=== Year-end charts ===
Chart (1985)	Rank
Australia (Kent Music Report)	5
Austria (Ö3 Austria Top 40)	22
Belgium (Ultratop 50 Flanders)	30
Canada Top Singles (RPM)	3
Netherlands (Dutch Top 40)	24
Netherlands (Single Top 100)	36
New Zealand (RIANZ)	17
South Africa (Springbok Radio)	12
Switzerland (Schweizer Hitparade)	12
UK Singles (OCC)	11
US Billboard Hot 100	4
US Adult Contemporary (Billboard)	21
US Album Rock Tracks (Billboard)	16
US Cash Box Top 100	8
West Germany (Media Control)	16

== Certifications ==
Region	Certification	Certified units/sales
Denmark (IFPI Danmark)	Platinum	90,000^{‡}
Italy (FIMI)	Gold	50,000^{‡}
Mexico (AMPROFON)	Diamond+2× Platinum+Gold	450,000^{‡}
New Zealand (RMNZ)	4× Platinum	120,000^{‡}
Spain (Promusicae)	Platinum	60,000^{‡}
United Kingdom (BPI)	2× Platinum	2,000,000^{‡}
United States (RIAA)	Platinum	1,000,000^{^}
United States (RIAA) Digital	Platinum	1,000,000^{‡}
^{^} Shipments figures based on certification alone.^{‡} Sales+streaming figures based on certification alone.

== Tina Arena version ==
"I Want to Know What Love Is"

Single by Tina Arena

from the album In Deep
- Released: August 6, 1998
- Length: 6:21 (album version); 5:34 (Australian album edit); 4:55 (single edit)
- Label: Columbia
- Songwriter: Mick Jones
- Producer: Mick Jones

Tina Arena singles chronology
"Whistle Down the Wind" (1998)	"I Want to Know What Love Is" (1998)	"I Want to Spend My Lifetime Loving You" (1998)

Music video
- "I Want to Know What Love is" on YouTube

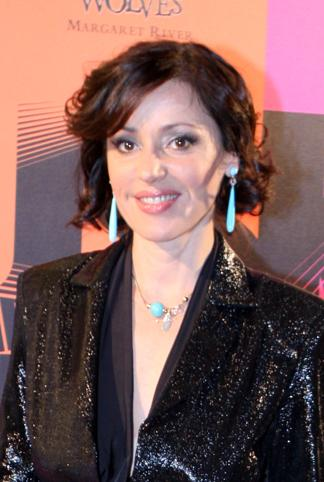
Tine Arena, 2012

"I Want to Know What Love Is" was covered by Australian singer Tina Arena and her recording was released as a single in 1998 from her album In Deep. Arena's version of the song was produced by Foreigner band member Mick Jones, who wrote the song. This version of the song includes a previously unrecorded bridge between the second and third choruses, specifically written for Tina Arena by Mick Jones.

=== Track listings ===
European Maxi Single

1. "I Want to Know What Love Is" (Single Edit)
2. "I Want to Know What Love Is" (R & B Mix)
3. "I Want to Spend My Lifetime Loving You" (G-Vo Extended Mix)
4. "Not For Sale"

Australian CD1 Maxi Single

1. "I Want To Know What Love Is" (Single Edit)
2. "Now I Can Dance" (Spanglish Version)
3. "Now I Can Dance" (Live)
4. "If I Didn't Love You" (Remix)

Australian CD2 Maxi Single – The Remixes

1. "I Want to Know What Love Is" (R'n'B Mix)
2. "I Want to Know What Love Is" (Urban Mix)
3. "I Want to Know What Love Is" (Extended Urban Mix)
4. "I Want to Know What Love Is" (Single Edit)

=== Charts ===
Chart (1998/99)	Peak Position
Australia (ARIA)	36
Belgium (Ultratop 50 Wallonia)	39
European Hot 100 Singles	50
Finland (Suomen virallinen singlelista)	18
France (SNEP)	13

=== Certifications ===
Region	Certification	Certified units/sales
France (SNEP)	Gold	250,000^{*}
^{*} Sales figures based on certification alone.

== Wynonna Judd version ==
"I Want to Know What Love Is"

Single by Wynonna Judd

from the album What the World Needs Now Is Love
- Released: August 24, 2004
- Length: 5:41 (album version)
- Label: Asylum; Curb
- Songwriter: Mick Jones
- Producers: Narada Michael Walden; Wynonna

Wynonna Judd singles chronology
"Flies on the Butter" (2004)	"I Want to Know What Love Is" (2004)	"Rescue Me" (2005)

Audio video
- "I Want to Know What Love Is" on YouTube

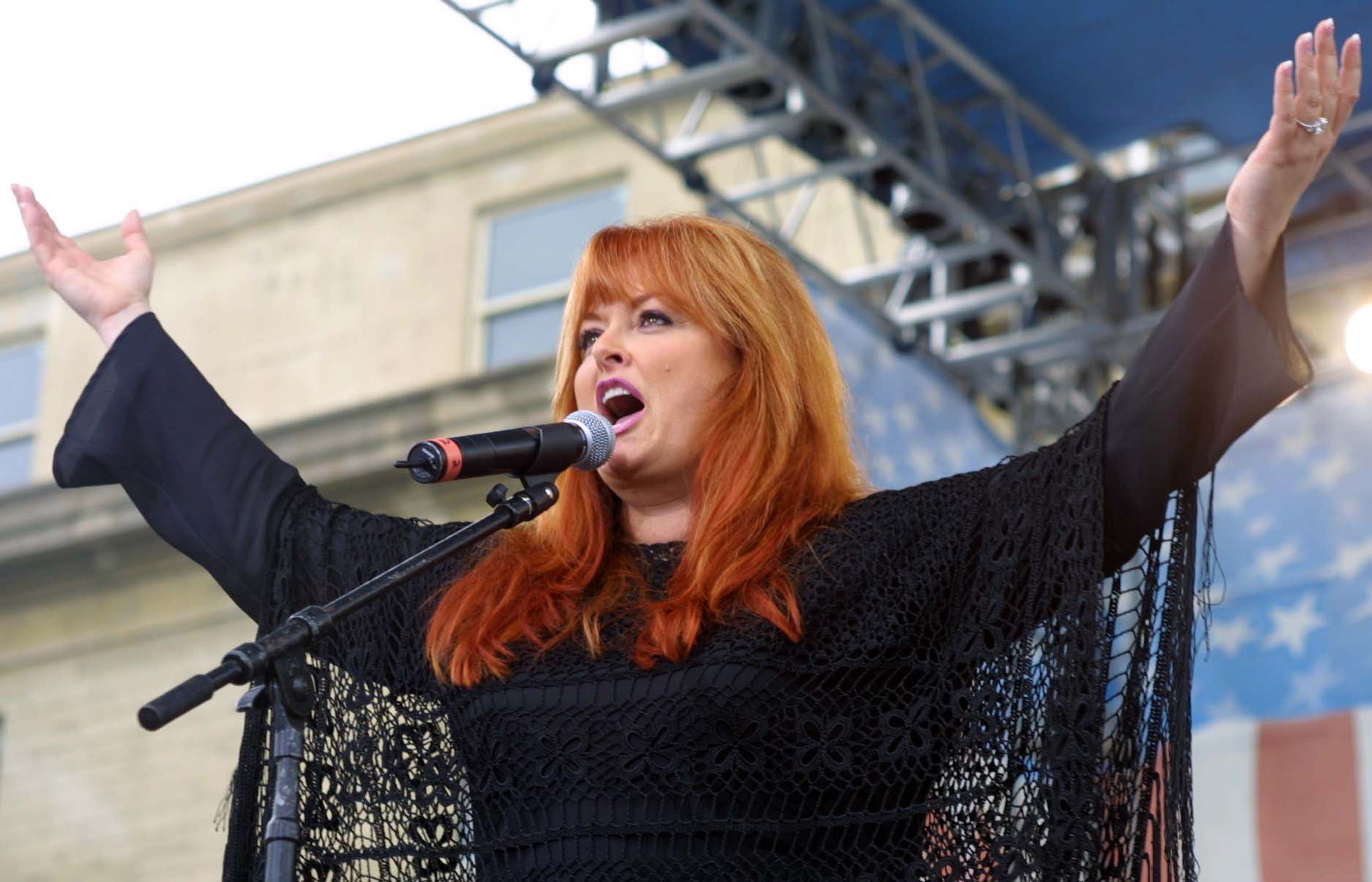
Wynonna Judd, 2004

"I Want to Know What Love Is" was covered by American country singer Wynonna Judd and her recording was released on August 24, 2004, as the fourth single from her album What the World Needs Now Is Love. Wynonna's version of the song was produced by Narada Michael Walden, known for his work with Mariah Carey, Whitney Houston, Diana Ross, Aretha Franklin and George Michael. This version of the song was included in a popular Brazilian soap opera, Senhora do Destino.

=== Personnel ===
- Wynonna Judd – lead vocals
- Tim Akers – keyboards
- Steve Nathan – keyboards
- Jeff Beck – lead guitar
- Tom Bukovac – electric guitar
- Dann Huff – electric guitar
- Jerry McPherson – electric guitar
- Don Potter – acoustic guitar
- Paul Franklin – steel guitar
- Jimmie Lee Sloas – bass
- Willie Weeks – bass
- John "J.R." Robinson – drums
- David Huff – loop programming
- Eric Darken – percussion
- David Campbell – string arrangements and conductor
- Suzie Katayama – string contractor
- Bob Bailey – backing vocals
- Bekka Bramlett – backing vocals
- Kim Fleming – backing vocals
- Vicki Hampton – backing vocals

=== Track listings ===
Digital download

1. "I Want to Know What Love Is" – 5:41

Remixes

1. "I Want to Know What Love Is" (Piper Remix) – 4:05
2. "I Want to Know What Love Is" (Piper Club Mix) – 7:42

=== Chart performance ===
In the US, the song peaked at number 14 on the Billboard Adult Contemporary chart. On the Hot Dance Club Songs of Billboard, it debuted at number 50 and peaked at number 12. It is also her first single to chart in Sweden, where it debuted at number 67 and peaked at number 15.

=== Charts ===
Chart (2004/2005)	Peak position
Sweden (Sverigetopplistan)	15
US Adult Contemporary (Billboard)	14
US Hot Dance Club Songs (Billboard)	12

=== Release history ===
Region	Date	Format	Label
United States	August 24, 2004	Digital download, CD single	Asylum
United States	August 24, 2004	Remixes	Curb Records
Sweden	February 20, 2005	Digital download, CD single	Curb Records

== Mariah Carey version ==
"I Want to Know What Love Is"

Single by Mariah Carey

from the album Memoirs of an Imperfect Angel
- B-side: "Obsessed" (Cahill Club Mix)
- Released: September 22, 2009
- Recorded: 2009
- Studio: The Boom Boom Room, Burbank, California; The Setai, Miami, Florida; Honeywest, New York City; Soapbox, Atlanta
- Length: 3:37 (single version); 3:27 (album version)
- Label: Island
- Songwriter: Mick Jones
- Producers: Mariah Carey; C. "Tricky" Stewart; James "Big Jim" Wright

Mariah Carey singles chronology
"Obsessed" (2009)	"I Want to Know What Love Is" (2009)	"H.A.T.E.U." (2009)

Music video
- "I Want to Know What Love Is" on YouTube

"I Want to Know What Love Is" was covered by American singer Mariah Carey and released as the second single on September 22, 2009, from her twelfth studio album, Memoirs of an Imperfect Angel (2009). The single, produced by Carey, C. "Tricky" Stewart and James "Big Jim" Wright, was sent to European radio stations on August 28 and first impacted US radio on September 14, 2009. Mick Jones said of her version: "I think she's actually retained the integrity of the song. You know, the arrangement is very similar to the original. They haven't tampered with the song too much. She's captured a certain emotional thing, a feeling." The remixes of her rendition were released on October 20, 2009.

=== Critical reception ===
The single was generally well received by critics; Australian magazine Rhyme & Reason stated that "[While Carey stayed] [...] true to the original, this piano-led remake is less an overhaul of the classic '80s hit than it is a modest but impressive update." Bill Lamb from About.com said that "Mariah Carey's new version could leave you speechless. The diversity of vocal coloring expressed in this recording is stunning. While the single 'Obsessed' remains disappointing, this single is a reminder of just how formidable Carey's talents are given a strong production and arrangement".

Writing in a Los Angeles Times music blog, Todd Martens said, "[T]ackling a well-known power ballad seems like a safe choice. It's a comfortable fall-back plan after "Obsessed" performed well, but did far from blockbuster numbers. It will undoubtedly be a hit, but it's giving me more reason to fear Imperfect Angel."

=== Chart performance ===
The song peaked on the US Billboard Adult Contemporary chart at number 10 bringing Carey's total number of Top Ten hits on that chart to 20, one short of Celine Dion's record. She has since surpassed this and is now tied with Dion after her single "Oh Santa!" reached number one in 2010. However, it only peaked at #60 on the US Hot 100. On the UK Singles Chart, the song debuted at number 19 on the week ending November 29, 2009, becoming her highest debuting and peaking song since 2008's "Touch My Body", which peaked at number five. "I Want to Know What Love Is" was also a successful hit on the Dance Club Songs chart, peaked at #2 on the week of December 19, 2009.

The song debuted at number six in France, selling 1,910 CDs in its first week.

Carey's version particularly found massive success in Brazil. Boosted by its inclusion in the international soundtrack for the popular telenovela Viver a Vida, the song stayed at number one for 27 consecutive weeks on the airplay chart, becoming the longest running number one song ever in the country. The song has since been certified Diamond in Brazil.

=== Music video ===
Carey filmed a music video for "I Want to Know What Love Is" in September 2009 in New York City, directed by Hype Williams. The video premiered on Carey's official website on November 13, 2009. The video features Carey singing in Yankee Stadium, intercut with shots of the audience, often accompanied by loved ones, and some glimpses into the tough times in their past, as they grow emotional from the song's performance. A gospel choir joins Carey at the center of the stadium at the video's end. Carey wears the signature curly hairstyle from the initial stages of her career circa 1990–1993, maintaining the Memoirs theme of the album.

=== Live performances ===
Carey debuted "I Want to Know What Love Is" at her Live at the Pearl concerts in the Pearl Arena at the Palms Casino & Resort, Las Vegas, on September 11 and 12, 2009. She later performed the song live on The Oprah Winfrey Show on September 18. Following the album's release, she performed at Rockefeller Plaza for Today on October 2, where she sang the song along with "Obsessed" and "H.A.T.E.U.", also from the album, as well as "Make It Happen" (1992). New York radio station WWPR-FM contest featured as its prize a mini concert by Carey at the P.C. Richard Theater in TriBeCa, New York on October 5, where she performed the song as well as "Obsessed" and "H.A.T.E.U.". While in Asia, Carey performed the track on TV shows You Hee-yeol's Sketchbook and Music Station, in South Korea and Japan, respectively. In Europe, Carey performed the single on X Factor Italia on November 11, 2009. She also performed the single on the British version of The X Factor on November 22, 2009. Carey additionally performed "I Want to Know What Love Is" on British talk shows Alan Carr: Chatty Man and GMTV.

In response to the song's success in the region, Carey performed the song during a concert in Brazil on August 21, 2010. More than a decade later, Carey performed the song as an encore in both concerts she did in Brazil in September 2024. The next year, she returned to the country and performed "I Want to Know What Love Is" at The Town Festival on September 13, 2025.

=== Formats and track listings ===
- Digital download
1. "I Want to Know What Love Is" (album version) – 3:27
- UK bundle
1. "I Want to Know What Love Is" (album version) – 3:27
2. "I Want to Know What Love Is" (Moto Blanco Club Edit) – 3:25
3. "I Want to Know What Love Is" (Chew Fu Radio Fix) – 3:51
- European CD single
1. "I Want to Know What Love Is" – 3:37
2. "Obsessed" (Cahill Club Mix) – 6:23
- Digital maxi-single
1. "I Want to Know What Love Is" (album version) – 3:27
2. "I Want to Know What Love Is" (Moto Blanco Club Edit) – 3:25
3. "I Want to Know What Love Is" (Chriss Ortega Club Edit) – 3:36
4. "I Want to Know What Love Is" (Cutmore's Club Shakedown) – 6:44
5. "I Want to Know What Love Is" (Donni Hotwheel Tempo Mix) – 3:05
6. "I Want to Know What Love Is" (Low Sunday Tempo Mix) – 3:14
7. "I Want to Know What Love Is" (Chew Fu Radio Fix) – 3:51
8. "I Want to Know What Love Is" (Nu Addiction Club Edit) – 3:29
- I Want to Know What Love Is (The Remixes)
1. "I Want to Know What Love Is" (Donni Hotwheel Tempo Mix) – 3:06
2. "I Want to Know What Love Is" (Low Sunday Tempo Mix) – 3:16
3. "I Want to Know What Love Is" (Moto Blanco Club Edit) – 3:25
4. "I Want to Know What Love Is" (Cutmore's Radio Shakedown) – 3:13
5. "I Want to Know What Love Is" (Chew Fu Radio Fix) – 3:52
6. "I Want to Know What Love Is" (Chriss Ortega Club Edit) – 3:36
7. "I Want to Know What Love Is" (Nu Addiction Club Edit) – 3:30
8. "I Want to Know What Love Is" (Moto Blanco Club Mix) – 6:53
9. "I Want to Know What Love Is" (Cutmore's Club Shakedown) – 6:45
10. "I Want to Know What Love Is" (Chew Fu Club Fix) – 6:03
11. "I Want to Know What Love Is" (Chriss Ortega Club Mix) – 6:05
12. "I Want to Know What Love Is" (Nu Addiction Club Mix) – 6:54
13. "I Want to Know What Love Is" (Moto Blanco Dub) – 6:23
14. "I Want to Know What Love Is" (Nu Addiction Dub) – 8:43

=== Credits and personnel ===
Adapted from CD liner notes.
Recording locations

- Recorded at The Boom Boom Room (Burbank, California), The Setai (Miami, Florida) and Honeywest Studios (New York City).
- Additional background vocals and mixing at Soapbox Studios (Atlanta).

Personnel

- Mariah Carey – lead vocals
- Matt Rollings – keyboards
- Tricky Stewart – keyboards, Hammond B3 organ
- Big Jim Wright – keyboards, Hammond B3 organ, backing vocals
- John Lemkuhl – keyboard programming
- Randy Jackson – bass
- Jerohn Garnett – drums
- Sherry McGhee – backing vocals
- Mary Ann Tatum – backing vocals
- Sherry Tatum – backing vocals
- Producer – C. "Tricky" Stewart, James "Big Jim" Wright and Mariah Carey
- Additional Producer – Randy Jackson
- Recorded by Brian Garten, Chris "Tek" O'Ryan and Kevin Guarnieri
- Assistant Engineer – Luis Navarro
- Additional Engineers – Carlos Oyanedel and Damien Lewis
- Mixed by Phil Tan
- Written by Mick Jones

=== Charts ===
Weekly charts

Chart (2009–2014)	Peak position
Australia (ARIA)	45
Austria (Ö3 Austria Top 40)	40
Belgium (Ultratip Bubbling Under Wallonia)	14
Brazil (Crowley Broadcast Analysis)	1
Canada Hot 100 (Billboard)	57
Canada AC (Billboard)	16
CIS Airplay (TopHit)	163
Croatia International Airplay (HRT)	3
Denmark (Tracklisten)	14
European Hot 100 Singles (Billboard)	16
Finland (Suomen virallinen radiosoittolista)	11
France (SNEP)	6
Germany (GfK)	37
Global Dance Songs (Billboard)	20
Hong Kong (Metro Radio)	4
Hungary (Mahasz)	6
Ireland (IRMA)	41
Italy (FIMI)	41
Japan (Japan Hot 100)	3
Mexico Ingles Airplay (Billboard)	4
New Zealand Easy Radio (RadioScope)	1
Portugal (Billboard)	5
Scottish Singles Sales (Official Charts)	30
Slovakia Airplay (ČNS IFPI)	84
Spain (Promusicae)	41
Sweden (Sverigetopplistan)	20
Switzerland (Schweizer Hitparade)	25
UK Singles (Official Charts)	19
UK Hip Hop/R&B (Official Charts)	7
UK Pop Club (Music Week)	1
Ukraine Airplay (TopHit)	35
US Billboard Hot 100	60
US Adult Contemporary (Billboard)	10
US Adult Pop Airplay (Billboard)	39
US Dance Club Songs (Billboard)	2
US Hot R&B/Hip-Hop Songs (Billboard)	40
US Rhythmic Airplay (Billboard)	29

Monthly charts

Chart (2010)	Position
Brazil (Brasil Hot 100 Airplay)	1
Brazil (Brasil Hot Pop Songs)	1

Year-end charts

Chart (2009)	Position
Brazil (Crowley Broadcast Analysis)	34
Croatia International Airplay (HRT)	70
France (SNEP)	97
Japan Adult Contemporary (Billboard)	47
US Adult Contemporary (Billboard)	37

Chart (2010)	Position
Brazil (Crowley Broadcast Analysis)	1
US Adult Contemporary (Billboard)	31
US Dance Club Songs (Billboard)	48

=== Certifications and sales ===
Certifications for "I Want to Know What Love Is"
Region	Certification	Certified units/sales
Brazil (Pro-Música Brasil)	Diamond	250,000^{‡}
^{‡} Sales+streaming figures based on certification alone.

=== Release history ===
Release dates and formats for "I Want to Know What Love Is"
Region	Date	Format(s)	Label(s)	Ref(s).
United States	September 15, 2009	Contemporary hit radio; adult contemporary radio; hot adult contemporary radio	Island	
United States	September 22, 2009	Digital download	Island	
Norway	October 20, 2009	The remixes (digital)	Universal Music	
South Korea	October 20, 2009	CD single	Universal Music	
United Kingdom	November 22, 2009	Digital download	Mercury	
France	November 30, 2009	CD single	Universal Music	
Germany	December 4, 2009	CD single	Universal Music	

== See also ==
- List of Billboard Hot 100 number-one singles of 1985
