= The Observer (Kearny, New Jersey) =

American newspaper

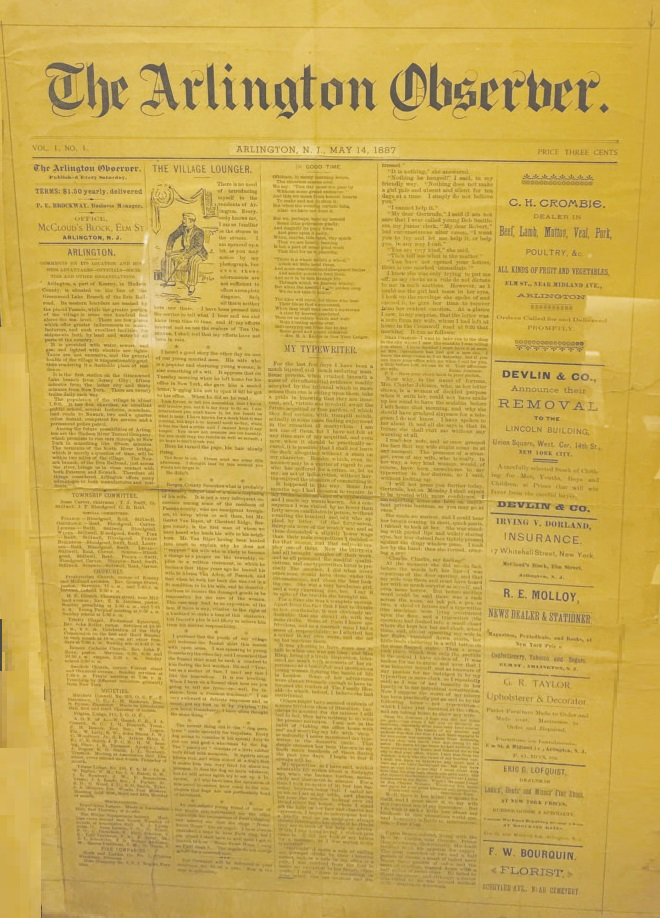
- Front page of the first issue of The Arlington Observer.
- Type: Newspaper
- Format: Tabloid
- Founded: May 14, 1887; 139 years ago
- Language: English
- Headquarters: 39 Seeley Ave., Kearny, New Jersey
- OCLC number: 15795218
- Website: theobserver.com

The Observer is an American newspaper based in Kearny, New Jersey.

== About ==
The Observer is a weekly newspaper based out of Kearny, New Jersey — and is the oldest, continuously running business in Kearny. It also serves the neighboring communities of Harrison, East Newark, North Arlington, Lyndhurst, Belleville, Bloomfield and Nutley. Jim Hague, a long-time sportswriter, wrote for the newspaper from 2002-2022. He retired in March 2022.

Other staff writers of The Observer have written for the New York Daily News, The Jersey Journal, the Hudson Dispatch, "The Bergen Record," DiversityInc magazine and the Associated Press. The newspaper's current editor, Kevin A. Canessa Jr., has been with the publication from 2006 to the present.

=== History ===
The forerunner of The Observer was a weekly newspaper, entitled the Kearny Republican. It officially began operation on May 14, 1887, as The Arlington Observer. The name Arlington is from the section of Kearny along the Greenwood Lake Branch of the Erie Railroad.

The first issue was a single-page news broadsheet, filled with stories about the town and its residents. Early issues contained stories of local businesses, institutions such as the town's five churches, one public school, the shipyards, and manufacturing companies that framed the hub of the area.

Annual subscription was $1.50, or 3¢ per copy. The title was changed to The Observer in 1889, and was shortly named The Kearny Observer during a portion of 1936, before reverting to its original title later that year.

By 1939, the paper was recognized for wielding a powerful influence in its section of New Jersey. The newspaper registered the domain theobserver.com in 1996, and in the early 2000s, it changed its format from broadsheet to tabloid, and featured the addition of sporadic color printing.

In 2012, it offered readers an online e-Newspaper, which features breaking news with video and audio. The newspaper now offers live video news on location at news scenes and in its TV studio based in the newsroom, via Facebook Live, including a weekly news recap every Tuesday at 1:30 p.m. ET.
