= The Budget (New Jersey newspaper) =

The Budget.
- Publisher: A. S. Ovebmiller
- Editor: A. S. Ovebmiller
- Founded: 1879
- Ceased publication: 1888
- Language: English
- City: Millburn, New Jersey
- Country: United States
- Circulation: 465 (as of 1886)

The Budget was a local newspaper that serviced Millburn, New Jersey in 1886.

== History ==
The Budget was founded by editor and publisher A. S. Ovebmiller. The Budget succeeded Millburn's original paper, The Monitor which had operated in 1879 before moving to nearby Westfield. During its existence The Budget successfully petitioned the county to renovate the town's roads, as well as successfully calling for renovations to the Millburn station. The paper also contained local news, obituaries, and frequently called on Millburn residents to only spend their money in Millburn, and acted as a general booster for the town.

A source of pride among Millburnites as the first newspaper printed in Millburn (The Monitor was printed in Madison), every volume of the 1886 edition of The Budget has been preserved by the Millburn-Short Hills Historical Society and can be found on their website. After the paper closed some time in 1888, Millburn would be serviced by The News Item, which is still in operation to this day.
