= Herald News =

Daily newspaper

Coordinates: 40.904589°N 74.189063°W

- Type: Daily newspaper
- Format: Broadsheet
- Owner: USA Today Co.
- Editor: Deirdre Sykes
- Founded: 1872 (as Passaic City Herald); 1988 (as North Jersey Herald & News)
- Headquarters: One Garret Mountain Plaza; CN 473; Woodland Park, New Jersey; United States
- Website: northjersey.com

The Herald News is a daily broadsheet newspaper headquartered in Woodland Park, New Jersey, that focuses on the Passaic County, New Jersey area. Today's Herald News is descended from several papers, but did not come to be until two Passaic County papers out of Passaic and Paterson merged in 1988.

The Herald News is an edition of The Record, a publication serving Bergen County, New Jersey that was formerly based in Hackensack, New Jersey. Both papers are owned by Gannett Company, which purchased Herald News parent North Jersey Media Group in 2016.

== History ==
One of the two papers that merged to form the now-Herald News was the North Jersey Herald-News, which grew from the mergers of several papers in the Passaic-Clifton metropolitan area, and for many years was known as the Passaic Herald News. The paper was headquartered at the intersection of Main Avenue and Highland Avenue in Passaic, just over the border with Clifton. In the 1970s, the paper became known as the North Jersey Herald-News and was owned by the Drukker family, with former Congressman Dow Drukker founding the paper and relative Austin Crane Drukker owning and publishing the paper by the early 1980s.

Beginning publication in 1890, the Paterson Evening News was one of several daily papers that called the county seat of Passaic county home. The paper's chief competitor was the Paterson Morning Call, which eventually grew and absorbed the Paterson Morning News to become the Paterson News and Call. By the 1970s the News and Call and Evening News were the two remaining papers in Paterson. The two eventually merged in 1980, operating out of the headquarters of the Evening News on 16th Avenue, and became simply known as The News. At the time, the paper was owned by Allbritton Communications Company.

In 1985, MediaNews Group bought The News from Albritton. Shortly thereafter, the Drukker family sold control of the Herald-News to a MediaNews affiliate. MediaNews continued to operate both The News and the Herald-News out of their respective plants in Paterson and Passaic while beginning to plan a merger. In July 1987, the weekend editions of The News and North Jersey Sunday (the name for the Sunday Herald-News) were merged. Then, in September, MediaNews finalized the merger of the daily editions and the paper became known as The North Jersey Herald & News. Following the merger the former Evening News headquarters were closed, and publishing operations were moved to the old Herald-News headquarters in Passaic. The Evening News building is now used by a Paterson elementary school. For its new combined paper, MediaNews developed the slogan "FIRST with the news...everyday!" and designed an accompanying rising sun logo.

In 1997 MediaNews sold the paper to the Borg family, owners of The Record of Hackensack, New Jersey. In 2000, North Jersey Media Group was formed as a holding company for the Borgs' assets, including the Herald News.

Early in the 2000s, the paper dropped the ampersand from its name, and later would drop "North Jersey" as well, just being called the Herald News. Shortly thereafter, the operations of both The Record and the Herald News were merged. North Jersey Media Group set up a new headquarters in what is now Woodland Park (at the time, the municipality was still known as West Paterson) and moved the entire operation of the Herald News there. They also moved most of the operations of The Record, including its former Passaic County bureau that was located in Wayne, New Jersey, to the new site. Later, North Jersey Media Group closed the former Record headquarters in Hackensack and consolidated the remaining resources there into the corporate headquarters in Woodland Park. The two papers have operated largely as a single entity, featuring mostly the same stories but laid out in different areas; for instance, an article might be on the front page of The Record but be found somewhere inside the main section of the Herald News. Gannett ceased this practice following their acquisition of both papers and both are now identically printed, with the only differences being the papers’ respective mastheads.

The Herald News' primary area of concentration is in Passaic County, while also covering news in the suburbs of the county (areas of Bergen, Essex, and Morris Counties) as well.

== Lineage ==
- The North Jersey Herald & News (Passaic, N.J.) 1987–2012, OCLC 16816434, including renamed versions North Jersey Herald News and Herald News
  - The News (Paterson, N.J.) 1980–1987, OCLC 11012534
    - Paterson Evening News (Paterson, N.J.) 1890–1969, OCLC 10503518
    - Paterson News and Call
      - Paterson Morning Call
      - Paterson Morning News
  - North Jersey Herald-News (Passaic, N.J.) 19??-1987, OCLC 15492268 and North Jersey Sunday
    - Passaic Herald News, also known simply as The Herald-News

== Notable staff ==
- Jay Horwitz (born 1945), New York Mets executive
