= Daily Record (New Jersey) =

Daily newspaper of the USA Today Network

- The July 27, 2005 front page of the Daily Record
- Type: Daily newspaper
- Format: Broadsheet
- Owner: USA Today Co.
- Publisher: Joe Cavone
- Editor: James A. Flachsenhaar
- Founded: 1900
- Language: American English
- Headquarters: Parsippany, New Jersey
- Country: United States
- Circulation: 1,435 (as of 2024)
- OCLC number: 12777527
- Website: dailyrecord.com

The Daily Record is a six-day morning daily newspaper of the USA Today Network located in Parsippany-Troy Hills, New Jersey.

The Daily Record serves the greater Morris County area of northern New Jersey, Essex County and the south-western suburbs of New York City. It is owned by USA Today Co., who purchased it from the Goodson Newspaper Group in 1998. Goodson had owned the paper since 1987.

== See also ==
- List of newspapers in New Jersey
